= Mainichi Film Award for Best Actress =

Annual Japanese film award

- Awarded for: Best actress of the year
- Country: Japan
- First award: 1947

The Mainichi Film Award for Best Actress is a film award given at the Mainichi Film Awards.

== Award winners ==
Year	Film	Actress
1947	The Love of the Actress Sumako; Marriage; Fushichō	Kinuyo Tanaka
1948	Women of the Night; A Hen in the Wind	Kinuyo Tanaka
1949	Late Spring; Aoi sanmyaku Here's to the Girls	Setsuko Hara
1950	Rashomon; Clothes of Deception	Machiko Kyō
1951	Repast; Early Summer	Setsuko Hara
1952	Hakone Fūunroku; The Moderns	Isuzu Yamada
1953	A Japanese Tragedy	Yūko Mochizuki
1954	Twenty-Four Eyes; The Garden of Women; Somewhere Under the Broad Sky; Aku no Yuyushisa	Hideko Takamine
1955	Floating Clouds	Hideko Takamine
1956	Flowing; A Cat, Shozo, and Two Women; Boshizō	Isuzu Yamada
1957	Untamed Woman; Times of Joy and Sorrow	Hideko Takamine
1958	Summer Clouds; Hotarubi	Chikage Awashima
1959	Kiku to Isamu	Tanie Kitabayashi
1960	Her Brother	Keiko Kishi
1961	Immortal Love; Happiness of Us Alone	Hideko Takamine
1962	Akitsu Springs; Kotoshi no Koi	Mariko Okada
1963	The Insect Woman; She and He	Sachiko Hidari
1964	Sweet Sweat	Machiko Kyō
1965	A Fugitive from the Past	Sachiko Hidari
1966	The River Kino	Yoko Tsukasa
1967	Portrait of Chieko; Clouds at Sunset	Shima Iwashita
1968	Operation Negligee; Kuroneko	Nobuko Otowa
1969	Double Suicide; The Song from My Heart	Shima Iwashita
1970	Where Spring Comes Late; Tora-san's Runaway	Chieko Baisho
1971	Red Peony Gambler: Here to Kill You	Sumiko Fuji
1972	The Long Darkness	Komaki Kurihara
1973	Seigen-ki	Atsuko Kaku
1974	Sandakan No. 8 Three Old Ladies	Kinuyo Tanaka
1975	Tora-san's Rise and Fall	Ruriko Asaoka
1976	Brother and Sister	Kumiko Akiyoshi
1977	Ballad of Orin	Shima Iwashita
1978	The Love Suicides at Sonezaki	Meiko Kaji
1979	No More Easy Life	Kaori Momoi
1980	A Distant Cry from Spring	Chieko Baisho
1981	Station; Tora-san's Love in Osaka	Chieko Baisho
1982	Fall Guy; Lovers Lost	Keiko Matsuzaka
1983	Crossing Mt. Amagi	Yūko Tanaka
1984	Ohan; Station to Heaven	Sayuri Yoshinaga
1985	Love Letter; Nuclear Gypsies	Mitsuko Baisho
1986	House on Fire; Tokei – Adieu l'hiver	Ayumi Ishida
1987	River of Fireflies; Yogisha; Yakuza Ladies 2	Yukiyo Toake
1988	Kaitō Ruby	Kyōko Koizumi
1989	Black Rain; Godzilla vs. Biollante	Yoshiko Tanaka
1990	The Sting of Death	Keiko Matsuzaka
1991	Rainbow Kids	Tanie Kitabayashi
1992	The Oil-Hell Murder; Sosuke Loses His Lover	Miwako Fujitani
1993	All Under the Moon	Ruby Moreno
1994	Turning Point	Sayuri Yoshinaga
1995	A Last Note	Haruko Sugimura
1996	Kyoko	Saki Takaoka
1997	Tokyo Lullaby	Kaori Momoi
1998	Begging for Love	Mieko Harada
1999	Will to Live; Poppoya; The Black House	Shinobu Otake
2000	Face	Naomi Fujiyama
2001	Turn	Riho Makise
2002	The Laughing Frog; Man Walking on Snow; Utsutsu	Nene Otsuka
2003	Akame 48 Waterfalls; Vibrator	Shinobu Terajima
2004	Kamikaze Girls	Kyoko Fukada
2005	Hibi; Itsuka dokusho suruhi	Yūko Tanaka
2006	Memories of Matsuko	Miki Nakatani
2007	Town of Evening Calm, Country of Cherry Blossoms	Kumiko Asō
2008	The Kiss	Eiko Koike
2009	Nonchan Noriben	Manami Konishi
2010	Caterpillar	Shinobu Terajima
2011	Mainichi Kaasan	Kyōko Koizumi
2012	The Cowards Who Looked to the Sky	Tomoko Tabata
2013	Pecoross' Mother and Her Days	Harue Akagi
2014	0.5 mm	Sakura Ando
2015	Our Little Sister	Haruka Ayase
2016	Harmonium	Mariko Tsutsui
2017	Before We Vanish	Masami Nagasawa
2018	Shoplifters	Sakura Ando
2019	The Journalist	Shim Eun-kyung
2020	A Beloved Wife	Asami Mizukawa
2021	A Madder Red	Machiko Ono
2022	Small, Slow But Steady	Yukino Kishii
2023	Ichiko	Hana Sugisaki
