= Kinema Junpo Award for Best Actress =

- Awarded for: Best Performance by an Actress in a Leading Role
- Country: Japan
- Presented by: Kinema Junpo
- Website: Kinema Junpo

The Kinema Junpo Awards for Best Actress is given by Kinema Junpo as part of its annual Kinema Junpo Awards for Japanese films, to recognize a female actor who has delivered an outstanding performance in a leading role.

== Winners ==
Year	Film(s)	Actress
1956	Floating Clouds	Hideko Takamine
1957	Flowing; A Cat, Shozo, and Two Women	Isuzu Yamada
1958	Throne of Blood; The Lower Depths; Downtown	Isuzu Yamada
1959	The Ballad of Narayama	Kinuyo Tanaka
1960	The Human Condition	Michiyo Aratama
1961	A Woman's Testament; The Twilight Story	Fujiko Yamamoto
1962	A Wife Confesses; Onna wa nido umareru	Ayako Wakao
1963	Akitsu Springs; This Year's Love	Mariko Okada
1964	The Insect Woman; She and He	Sachiko Hidari
1965	Sweet Sweat	Machiko Kyō
1966	Seisaku's Wife; Nami kage	Ayako Wakao
1967	The River Kino; Hit and Run; The Daphne	Yoko Tsukasa
1968	Life of a Woman; Portrait of Chieko; Clouds at Sunset	Shima Iwashita
1969	One Day at Summer's End; The House of Wooden Blocks; The Time of Reckoning	Ayako Wakao
1970	Double Suicide	Shima Iwashita
1971	Where Spring Comes Late; Tora-san's Runaway	Chieko Baisho
1972	Red Peony Gambler: Here to Kill You; Okoma: The Orphan Gambler	Sumiko Fuji
1973	Ichijo's Wet Lust; Delicate Skillful Fingers	Hiroko Isayama
1974	Tsugaru Folk Song	Kyôko Enami
1975	Sandakan No. 8	Kinuyo Tanaka
1976	Tora-san's Rise and Fall	Ruriko Asaoka
1977	Lullaby of the Earth; The Youth Killer	Mieko Harada
1978	Ballad of Orin	Shima Iwashita
1979	The Love Suicides at Sonezaki	Meiko Kaji
1980	No More Easy Life	Kaori Momoi
1981	Zigeunerweisen	Naoko Otani
1982	Station	Chieko Baisho
1983	Fall Guy; Lovers Lost	Keiko Matsuzaka
1984	Crossing Mt. Amagi	Yūko Tanaka
1985	Ohan; Station to Heaven	Sayuri Yoshinaga
1986	Love Letter; Nuclear Gypsies	Mitsuko Baisho
1987	Katayoku dake no tenshi	Yoko Akino
1988	A Taxing Woman	Nobuko Miyamoto
1989	The Yen Family; Tomorrow; Love Bites Back	Kaori Momoi
1990	Black Rain	Yoshiko Tanaka
1991	The Sting of Death	Keiko Matsuzaka
1992	Rainbow Kids	Tanie Kitabayashi
1993	Nurses and Doctors; Original Sin	Shinobu Otake
1994	All Under the Moon	Ruby Moreno
1995	Crest of Betrayal	Saki Takaoka
1996	A Last Note	Haruko Sugimura
1997	Village of Dreams	Mieko Harada
1998	Tokyo Lullaby	Kaori Momoi
1999	Begging for Love	Mieko Harada
2000	Keiho	Kyōka Suzuki
2001	Face	Naomi Fujiyama
2002	Hush!	Reiko Kataoka
2003	The Twilight Samurai; Utsutsu	Rie Miyazawa
2004	Akame 48 Waterfalls; Vibrator	Shinobu Terajima
2005	The Face of Jizo	Rie Miyazawa
2006	Hibi	Yūko Tanaka
2007	Loft; Memories of Matsuko; Christmas on July 24th Avenue	Miki Nakatani
2008	Midnight Eagle; Dog in a Sidecar; Closed Note	Yūko Takeuchi
2009	Gū-Gū Datte Neko de Aru; Tokyo Sonata	Kyōko Koizumi
2010	Villon's Wife	Takako Matsu
2011	Caterpillar	Shinobu Terajima
2012	Rebirth	Hiromi Nagasaku
2013	Our Homeland	Sakura Ando
2014	Like Father, Like Son; The Ravine of Goodbye; Sue, Mai & Sawa: Righting the Girl Ship	Yōko Maki
2015	100 Yen Love; 0.5 mm	Sakura Ando
2016	Journey to the Shore; Parasyte: Part 2	Eri Fukatsu
2017	Her Love Boils Bathwater	Rie Miyazawa
2018	Birds Without Names	Yū Aoi
2019	Shoplifters	Sakura Ando
2020	It Feels So Good	Kumi Takiuchi
2021	A Beloved Wife; Runway	Asami Mizukawa
2022	A Madder Red	Machiko Ono
2023	Small, Slow But Steady and others	Yukino Kishii
2024	Shadow of Fire	Shuri
2025	Desert of Namibia; A Girl Named Ann	Yuumi Kawai
2026	Two Seasons, Two Strangers	Shim Eun-kyung
