= Blue Ribbon Award for Best Actress =

Annual Japanese film award

- Awarded for: Best Performance by an Actress in a Leading Role
- Country: Japan
- Presented by: The Association of Tokyo Film Journalists
- First award: 1950

The Blue Ribbon Award for Best Actress is as part of its annual Blue Ribbon Awards for Japanese film, to recognize a female actor who has delivered an outstanding performance in a leading role. The award was first given in 1954 for the films released in preceding year 1950.

== List of winners ==
No.	Year	Recipient	Film(s)
1	1950	Chikage Awashima	Crazy Uproar
2	1951	Setsuko Hara	Repast; Early Summer
3	1952	Isuzu Yamada	The Moderns; Hakone Fūunroku
4	1953	Nobuko Otowa	Yokubo; Epitome; Life of a Woman
5	1954	Hideko Takamine	Twenty-Four Eyes; The Garden of Women; Somewhere Under the Broad Sky
6	1955	Chikage Awashima	Sweet Beans for Two
7	1956	Isuzu Yamada	Boshizō; A Cat, Shozo, and Two Women; Flowing
8	1957	Yūko Mochizuki	Unagitori; The Rice People
9	1958	Fujiko Yamamoto	The Snowy Heron; Equinox Flower
10	1959	Tanie Kitabayashi	Kiku to Isamu
11	1960	Keiko Kishi	Her Brother
12	1961	Ayako Wakao	A Wife Confesses; Onna wa nido umareru The Age of Marriage
13	1962	Sayuri Yoshinaga	Foundry Town
14	1963	Sachiko Hidari	The Insect Woman; She and He
15	1964	Shima Iwashita	The Scarlet Camellia
16	1965	Ayako Wakao	Seisaku's Wife; Nami kage
17	1966	Yoko Tsukasa	The River Kino
18	1975	Ruriko Asaoka	Tora-san's Rise and Fall
19	1976	Kumiko Akiyoshi	Brother and Sister; Saraba natsuno hikariyo
20	1977	Shima Iwashita	Ballad of Orin
21	1978	Meiko Kaji	The Love Suicides at Sonezaki
22	1979	Kaori Momoi	No More Easy Life; Heaven Sent
23	1980	Yukiyo Toake	Furueru Shita
24	1981	Keiko Matsuzaka	The Gate of Youth; Tora-san's Love in Osaka
25	1982	Masako Natsume	Onimasa
26	1983	Yūko Tanaka	Crossing Mt. Amagi
27	1984	Hiroko Yakushimaru	W's Tragedy
28	1985	Yukiyo Toake	Gray Sunset
29	1986	Ayumi Ishida	House on Fire; Tokei – Adieu l'hiver
30	1987	Yoshiko Mita	Wakarenu riyû
31	1988	Kaori Momoi	The Yen Family; Love Bites Back; Tomorrow - ashita
32	1989	Yoshiko Tanaka	Black Rain
33	1990	Keiko Matsuzaka	The Sting of Death
34	1991	Youki Kudoh	War and Youth
35	1992	Yoshiko Mita	Faraway Sunset
36	1993	Ruby Moreno	All Under the Moon
37	1994	Saki Takaoka	Crest of Betrayal
38	1995	Miho Nakayama	Love Letter
39	1996	Mieko Harada	Village of Dreams
40	1997	Kaori Momoi	Tokyo Lullaby
41	1998	Mieko Harada	Begging for Love
42	1999	Kyōka Suzuki	Keiho
43	2000	Sayuri Yoshinaga	Nagasaki burabura bushi
44	2001	Yūki Amami	Inugami; Rendan; Sekai no Chushin de Ai o Sakebu
45	2002	Reiko Kataoka	Hush!
46	2003	Shinobu Terajima	Vibrator; Akame 48 Waterfalls
47	2004	Rie Miyazawa	The Face of Jizo
48	2005	Kyōko Koizumi	Hanging Garden
49	2006	Yū Aoi	Hula Girls; Honey and Clover
50	2007	Kumiko Asō	Town of Evening Calm, Country of Cherry Blossoms
51	2008	Tae Kimura	All Around Us
52	2009	Haruka Ayase	Oppai Volleyball
53	2010	Shinobu Terajima	Caterpillar
54	2011	Hiromi Nagasaku	Rebirth
55	2012	Sakura Ando	Our Homeland
56	2013	Shihori Kanjiya	Angel Home
57	2014	Sakura Ando	0.5 mm 100 Yen Love
58	2015	Kasumi Arimura	Flying Colors; Strobe Edge
59	2016	Shinobu Otake	Black Widow Business
60	2017	Yui Aragaki	Mixed Doubles
61	2018	Mugi Kadowaki	Dare to Stop Us
62	2019	Masami Nagasawa	The Confidence Man JP: The Movie
63	2020	Masami Nagasawa	The Confidence Man JP: Episode of the Princess; Mother
64	2021	Mei Nagano	And So the Baton Is Passed; Jigoku no Hanazono: Office Royale
65	2022	Chieko Baisho	Plan 75
66	2023	Sayuri Yoshinaga	Mom, Is That You?!
67	2024	Yuumi Kawai	A Girl Named Ann; Desert of Namibia
68	2025	Suzu Hirose	Yasuko, Songs of Days Past; A Pale View of Hills; Unreachable
