= Blue Ribbon Award for Best Supporting Actress =

Japanese film award

- Awarded for: Best Performance by a Supporting Actress
- Country: Japan
- Presented by: The Association of Tokyo Film Journalists
- First award: 1951

The Blue Ribbon Award for Best Supporting Actress is a prize recognizing an outstanding performance by a female supporting actress in a Japanese film. It is awarded annually by the Association of Tokyo Film Journalists as one of the Blue Ribbon Awards.

== List of winners ==
| No. | Year | Recipient | Film(s) |
|---|---|---|---|
| 1 | 1950 | N/A | N/A |
| 2 | 1951 | Haruko Sugimura | Early Summer; Repast; Inochi Uruwashi |
| 3 | 1952 | Chieko Nakakita | Oka wa Hanazakari; Lightning |
| 4 | 1953 | Chieko Naniwa | A Geisha |
| 5 | 1954 | Yūko Mochizuki | Late Chrysanthemums |
| 6 | 1955 | Isuzu Yamada | Takekurabe; Ishigassen |
| 7 | 1956 | Yoshiko Kuga | Yūyake Gumo; Joshū to Tomoni; Taiyō to Bara |
| 8 | 1957 | Keiko Awaji | Nyotai wa Kanashiku; Shitamachi |
| 9 | 1958 | Misako Watanabe | Hateshinaki Yokubō |
| 10 | 1959 | Michiyo Aratama | The Human Condition: No Greater Love; The Human Condition: Road to Eternity; Watashi wa Kai ni Naritai |
| 11 | 1960 | Tamao Nakamura | Bonchi; Dai Bosatsu Tōge |
| 12 | 1961 | Hizuru Takachiho | Haitoku no Mesu; Zero Focus |
| 13 | 1962 | Kyōko Kishida | The Broken Commandment; An Autumn Afternoon |
| 14 | 1963 | Yōko Minamida | Keirin Jōnin Gyōjōki; Samurai no Ko |
| 15 | 1964 | Jitsuko Yoshimura | Onibaba |
| 16 | 1965 | Terumi Niki | Red Beard |
| 17 | 1966 | Nobuko Otowa | Lost Sex |
| 18 | 1975 | Chieko Baisho | Tora-san's Rise and Fall |
| 19 | 1976 | Mieko Takamine | The Inugami Family |
| 20 | 1977 | Kaori Momoi | The Yellow Handkerchief |
| 21 | 1978 | Junko Miyashita | Dynamite Dondon; Bandits vs. Samurai Squadron |
| 22 | 1979 | Mitsuko Baisho | Vengeance Is Mine |
| 23 | 1980 | Mariko Kaga | Yūgure made |
| 24 | 1981 | Yūko Tanaka | Edo Porn; Eijanaika |
| 25 | 1982 | Miyako Yamaguchi | Farewell to the Land |
| 26 | 1983 | Eiko Nagashima | Ryūji |
| 27 | 1984 | Yoshiko Mita | W's Tragedy; Jo no Mai |
| 28 | 1985 | Mariko Fuji | Usugeshō; Kiken na Onnnatachi |
| 29 | 1986 | Shinobu Otake | Hakō Kirameku Hate |
| 30 | 1987 | Kumiko Akiyoshi | Yogisha |
| 31 | 1988 | Kumiko Akiyoshi | The Discarnates |
| 32 | 1989 | Kaho Minami | Yumemi Dōri no Hitobito; Sensei; Hotaru; 226 |
| 33 | 1990 | Tomoko Nakajima | Tugumi |
| 34 | 1991 | Jun Fubuki | Nowhere Man |
| 35 | 1992 | Miwako Fujitani | The Oil-Hell Murder; Sosuke Loses His Lover |
| 36 | 1993 | Kyōko Kagawa | Madadayo |
| 37 | 1994 | Shigeru Muroi | Ghost Pub |
| 38 | 1995 | Shinobu Nakayama | Gamera: Guardian of the Universe |
| 39 | 1996 | Kyōko Kishida | Gakkō no Kaidan 2 Yatsuhaka Mura |
| 40 | 1997 | Mitsuko Baisho | The Eel; Tokyo Lullaby |
| 41 | 1998 | Kimiko Yo | Gakko III; Wait and See |
| 42 | 1999 | Sumiko Fuji | The Geisha House |
| 43 | 2000 | Yoshiko Miyazaki | After the Rain |
| 44 | 2001 | Tomoko Naraoka | Hotaru |
| 45 | 2002 | Rie Miyazawa | The Twilight Samurai |
| 46 | 2003 | Michiyo Okusu | Zatōichi; Akame 48 Waterfalls |
| 47 | 2004 | Masami Nagasawa | Crying Out Love in the Center of the World; Shinkokyū no Hitsuyō |
| 48 | 2005 | Hiroko Yakushimaru | Always Sanchōme no Yūhi; Princess Raccoon |
| 49 | 2006 | Sumiko Fuji | Hula Girls; The Inugamis; Nezu no Ban |
| 50 | 2007 | Hiromi Nagasaku | Funuke Show Some Love, You Losers! |
| 51 | 2008 | Kirin Kiki | Still Walking |
| 52 | 2009 | Kyoko Fukada | Yatterman |
| 53 | 2010 | Yoshino Kimura | Confessions |
| 54 | 2011 | Masami Nagasawa | Moteki |
| 55 | 2012 | Ryōko Hirosue | Key of Life |
| 56 | 2013 | Fumi Nikaidō | Why Don't You Play in Hell? Nō Otoko; Shijū Kunichi no Recipe |
| 57 | 2014 | Satomi Kobayashi | Pale Moon |
| 58 | 2015 | Yō Yoshida | Flying Colors; Nōnai Poison Berry; Hero |
| 59 | 2016 | Hana Sugisaki | Her Love Boils Bathwater |
| 60 | 2017 | Yuki Saito | The Third Murder |
| 61 | 2018 | Mayu Matsuoka | Shoplifters; Chihayafuru Part 3 |
| 62 | 2019 | Megumi | The Stormy Family; One Night |
| 63 | 2020 | Sairi Ito | Theatre: A Love Story; Step; Hotel Royal; The Devil Wears Jūnihitoe |
| 64 | 2021 | Tōko Miura | Drive My Car |
| 65 | 2022 | Nana Seino | Kingdom 2: Far and Away; A Man; Offbeat Cops |
| 66 | 2023 | Minami Hamabe | Godzilla Minus One |
| 67 | 2024 | Kyoko Koizumi | Silence of the Sea; Bushido and others |
| 68 | 2025 | Misato Morita | Night Flower |
