= Mainichi Film Award for Excellence Film =

Annual Japanese film awards

- Awarded for: Excellence film of the year
- Country: Japan
- First award: 1976

The Mainichi Film Award for Excellence Film (日本映画優秀賞) is an award given at the Mainichi Film Awards.

== Winners ==
Year	Film
1976	The Youth Killer; Tora-san's Sunrise and Sunset; Brother and Sister
1977	The Life of Chikuzan; Mount Hakkoda; Ballad of Orin; Nemu no Ki no Uta ga Kikoeru
1978	Third Base; Empire of Passion; The Love Suicides at Sonezaki; Kaerazaru hibi
1979	Shōdō Satsujin Musuko Yo; The Man Who Stole the Sun; Vengeance Is Mine; No More Easy Life
1980	Zigeunerweisen; A Distant Cry from Spring; The Battle of Port Arthur; Virus
1981	Station; Willful Murder; Kofuku; Enrai
1982	Suspicion; Tōno Monogatari; Farewell to the Land; The Go Masters
1983	The Family Game; The Makioka Sisters; Tokyo Trial; The Ballad of Narayama
1984	The Funeral; MacArthur's Children; Mahjong hōrōki Ohan
1985	Sorekara; Typhoon Club; Fire Festival; The Burmese Harp
1986	House of Wedlock; House on Fire; Final Take; A Promise
1987	Itazu Kuma; Eiga Joyū; Tora-san Goes North; The Emperor's Naked Army Marches On
1988	The Discarnates; Kimurake no Hitobito; Tomorrow; The Silk Road
1989	Shaso; Death of a Tea Master; Dotsuitarunen; Rikyu
1990	The Cherry Orchard; Dreams; The Sting of Death; Shiroi Te
1991	Rainbow Kids; Rhapsody in August; A Scene at the Sea; Nowhere Man
1992	Seishun Dendeke Dekedeke; The River with No Bridge; Original Sin; Tōki Rakujitsu
1993	Moving; A Class to Remember; Byōin de Shinu to Iukoto; We Are Not Alone
1994	Ghost Pub; 119; Crest of Betrayal; Natsu no Niwa Friend; Like a Rolling Stone
1995	Kura; Sharaku; Deep River; Love Letter
1996	Village of Dreams; A Class to Remember 2 Kids Return; Nemuru Otoko
1997	The Eel; Yūkai; Welcome Back, Mr. McDonald
1998	A Class to Remember 3 Dr. Akagi; Give It All; Hana-bi
1999	Kikujiro; Jubaku: Spellbound; Keiho; M/Other
2000	After the Rain; Gohatto; A Class to Remember 4 Nabbie's Love
2001	Waterboys; Go; Nihon no Kuroi Natsu: Enzai; Battle Royale; Hotal
2002	Out; Letters from the Mountains; KT; Hush!
2003	Like Asura; Zatōichi; Spy Sorge; Doppelganger
2004	Nobody Knows
2005	Princess Raccoon
2006	Hula Girls
2007	A Gentle Breeze in the Village
2008	All Around Us
2009	Mt. Tsurugidake
2010	Haru's Journey
2011	Saudade
2012	The Kirishima Thing
2013	Pecoross' Mother and Her Days
2014	The Light Shines Only There
2015	Journey to the Shore
2016	In This Corner of the World
2017	Wilderness
2018	The Chrysanthemum and the Guillotine
2019	The Journalist
2020	Underdog
2021	Under the Open Sky
2022	No Place to Go
2023	Shadow of Fire
