= Japan Academy Film Prize for Outstanding Performance by an Actress in a Leading Role =

Japan Academy Prize for Outstanding Performance by an Actress in a Leading Role
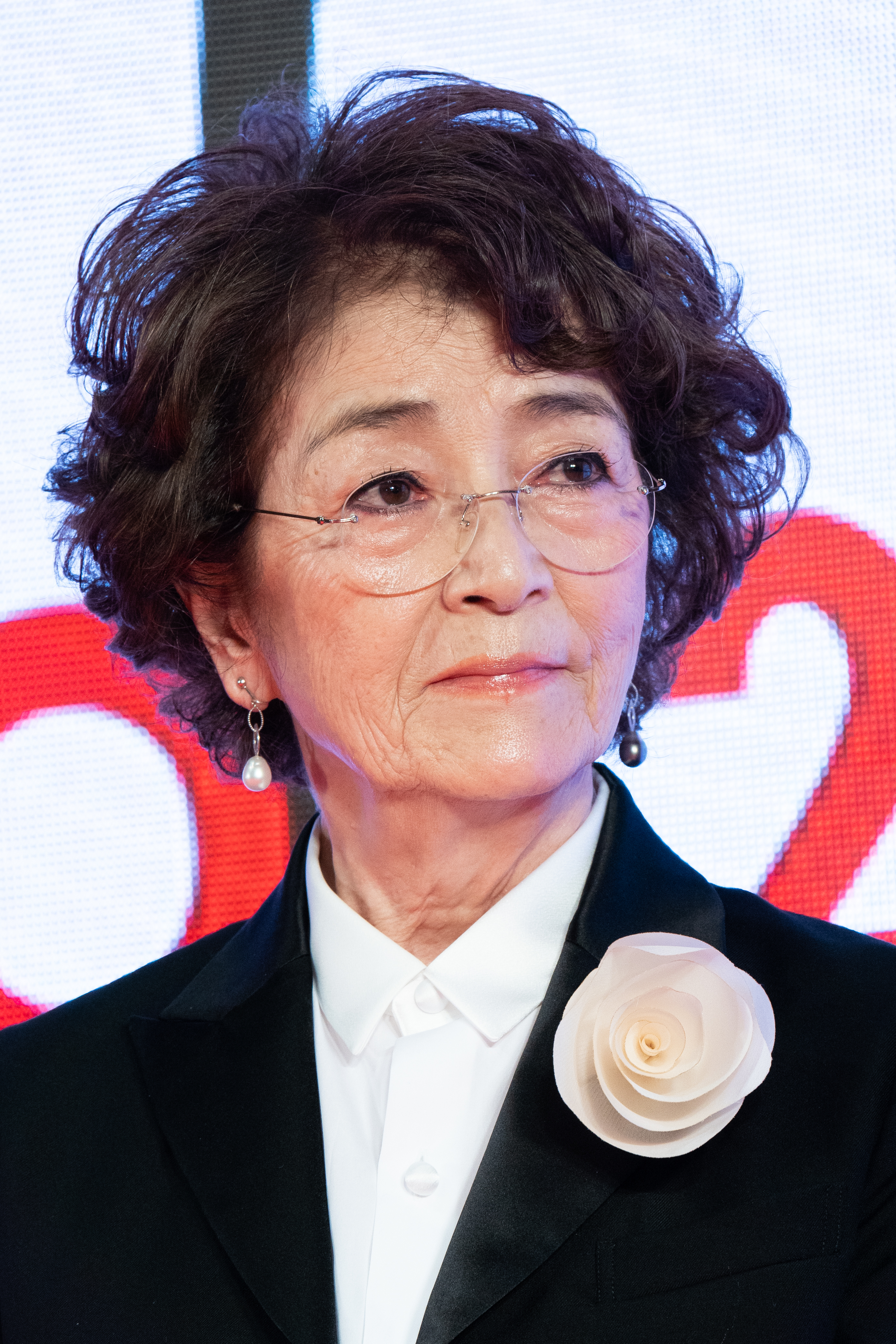
- The 2026 recipient: Chieko Baisho
- Awarded for: Excellence in Acting, Leading Role
- Country: Japan
- Presented by: The Nippon Academy-sho association
- First award: 1978
- Website: http://www.japan-academy-prize.jp/

The Outstanding Performance by an Actress in a Leading Role (最優秀主演女優賞) of the Japan Academy Prize is one of the annual Awards given by the Nippon Academy-sho association (Japan Academy Prize Association).

In 2020, Shim Eun-kyung, a South Korean, became the first non-Japanese actress to win this award.

== List of winners ==
Nr.	Year	Actress (English)	Actress (Japanese)	Film (English)	Film (Japanese)
1	1978	Shima Iwashita	岩下志麻	Ballad of Orin	はなれ瞽女おりん
2	1979	Shinobu Otake	大竹しのぶ	The Incident	事件
3	1980	Kaori Momoi	桃井かおり	Heaven Sent; No More Easy Life	神様のくれた赤ん坊 もう頬づえはつかない
4	1981	Chieko Baisho	倍賞千恵子	A Distant Cry From Spring; Otoko wa Tsurai yo: Tora-san's Tropical Fever	遙かなる山の呼び声 男はつらいよ 寅次郎ハイビスカスの花
5	1982	Keiko Matsuzaka	松坂慶子	The Gate of Youth; Otoko wa Tsurai yo: Tora-san's Love in Osaka	青春の門 男はつらいよ 浪花の恋の寅次郎
6	1983	Keiko Matsuzaka	松坂慶子	Fall Guy; Dotonbori River	蒲田行進曲 道頓堀川
7	1984	Rumiko Koyanagi	小柳ルミ子	Hakujasho	白蛇抄
8	1985	Sayuri Yoshinaga	吉永小百合	Ohan; Station to Heaven	おはん 天国の駅 HEAVEN STATION
9	1986	Mitsuko Baisho	倍賞美津子	Ikiteru uchiga hana nanoyo shin-dara sore madeyo to sengen Koibumi; Tomo yo shizukani nemure	生きてるうちが花なのよ 死んだらそれまでよ党宣言 恋文 友よ、静かに瞑れ
10	1987	Ayumi Ishida	いしだあゆみ	House on Fire; Tokei – Adieu l'hiver	火宅の人 時計 Adieu l'Hiver
11	1988	Nobuko Miyamoto	宮本信子	A Taxing Woman	マルサの女
12	1989	Sayuri Yoshinaga	吉永小百合	Tsuru; A Chaos of Flowers	つる-鶴- 華の乱
13	1990	Yoshiko Tanaka	田中好子	Black Rain	黒い雨
14	1991	Keiko Matsuzaka	松坂慶子	The Sting of Death	死の棘
15	1992	Tanie Kitabayashi	北林谷栄	Rainbow Kids	大誘拐
16	1993	Yoshiko Mita	三田佳子	Tōki Rakujitsu	遠き落日
17	1994	Emi Wakui	和久井映見	Rainbow Bridge	虹の橋
18	1995	Saki Takaoka	高岡早紀	Crest of Betrayal	忠臣蔵外伝 四谷怪談
19	1996	Yūko Asano	浅野ゆう子	Kura	藏
20	1997	Tamiyo Kusakari	草刈民代	Shall We Dance?	Shall we ダンス?
21	1998	Hitomi Kuroki	黒木瞳	Lost Paradise	失楽園
22	1999	Mieko Harada	原田美枝子	Begging for Love	愛を乞うひと
23	2000	Shinobu Otake	大竹しのぶ	Poppoya	鉄道員
24	2001	Sayuri Yoshinaga	吉永小百合	Nagasaki burabura bushi	長崎ぶらぶら節
25	2002	Keiko Kishi	岸惠子	Kā-chan	かあちゃん
26	2003	Rie Miyazawa	宮沢りえ	The Twilight Samurai	たそがれ清兵衛
27	2004	Shinobu Terajima	寺島しのぶ	Akame 48 Waterfalls	赤目四十八瀧心中未遂
28	2005	Kyōka Suzuki	鈴木京香	Blood and Bones	血と骨
29	2006	Sayuri Yoshinaga	吉永小百合	Year One in the North	北の零年
30	2007	Miki Nakatani	中谷美紀	Memories of Matsuko	嫌われ松子の一生
31	2008	Kirin Kiki	樹木希林	Tokyo Tower: Mom and Me, and Sometimes Dad	東京タワー 〜オカンとボクと、時々、オトン〜
32	2009	Tae Kimura	木村多江	All Around Us	ぐるりのこと。
33	2010	Takako Matsu	松たか子	Villon's Wife	ヴィヨンの妻 〜桜桃とタンポポ〜
34	2011	Eri Fukatsu	深津絵里	Villain	悪人
35	2012	Mao Inoue	井上真央	Rebirth	八日目の蝉
36	2013	Kirin Kiki	樹木希林	Chronicle of My Mother	わが母の記
37	2014	Yōko Maki	真木よう子	The Ravine of Goodbye	さよなら渓谷
38	2015	Rie Miyazawa	宮沢りえ	Pale Moon	紙の月
39	2016	Sakura Ando	安藤サクラ	100 Yen Love	百円の恋
40	2017	Rie Miyazawa	宮沢りえ	Her Love Boils Bathwater	湯を沸かすほどの熱い愛
41	2018	Yū Aoi	蒼井優	Birds Without Names	彼女がその名を知らない鳥たち
42	2019	Sakura Ando	安藤サクラ	Shoplifters	万引き家族
43	2020	Shim Eun-kyung	—N/a	The Journalist	新聞記者
44	2021	Masami Nagasawa	長澤まさみ	Mother	MOTHER マザー
45	2022	Kasumi Arimura	有村架純	We Made A Beautiful Bouquet	花束みたいな恋をした
46	2023	Yukino Kishii	岸井ゆきの	Small, Slow But Steady	ケイコ 目を澄ませて
47	2024	Sakura Ando	安藤サクラ	Monster	怪物
48	2025	Yuumi Kawai	河合優実	A Girl Named Ann	あんのこと
49	2026	Chieko Baisho	倍賞千恵子	Tokyo Taxi	TOKYOタクシー

== Multiple wins ==
The following individuals received multiple Best Actress awards:

Wins	Actor
4	Sayuri Yoshinaga
3	Keiko Matsuzaka
3	Rie Miyazawa
3	Sakura Ando
2	Shinobu Otake
2	Kirin Kiki
2	Chieko Baisho
