= Tora-san's Lovesick =

- Theatrical poster
- Directed by: Yoji Yamada
- Written by: Yoji Yamada; Yoshitaka Asama
- Starring: Kiyoshi Atsumi; Sayuri Yoshinaga
- Cinematography: Tetsuo Takaba
- Edited by: Iwao Ishii
- Music by: Naozumi Yamamoto
- Distributed by: Shochiku
- Release date: August 3, 1974
- Running time: 104 minutes
- Country: Japan
- Language: Japanese

Tora-san's Lovesick (男はつらいよ 寅次郎恋やつれ, Otoko wa Tsurai yo: Torajirō Koiyatsure) a.k.a. Tora-san's Lovesickness is a 1974 Japanese comedy film directed by Yoji Yamada, starring Kiyoshi Atsumi as Torajirō Kuruma (Tora-san), and Sayuri Yoshinaga as his love interest or "Madonna". Tora-san's Lovesick is the thirteenth entry in the popular, long-running Otoko wa Tsurai yo series.

== Synopsis ==
Tora-san returns home informing his family of his intention to marry. The plans are foiled when the woman's long-missing husband reappears. Later, Tora-san meets Utako from Tora-san's Dear Old Home (1972). Her husband has died, and, out of obligation, she is living with his demanding parents. Tora-san persuades her to come to Tokyo, where she meets her estranged father, an author. Torasan's romantic intentions with Utako come to nothing when she decides to devote her life to teaching mentally handicapped children.

== Cast ==
- Kiyoshi Atsumi as Torajirō
- Chieko Baisho as Sakura
- Sayuri Yoshinaga as Utako
- Tatsuo Matsumura as Kuruma Tatsuzō
- Chieko Misaki as Tsune Kuruma (Torajiro's aunt)
- Gin Maeda as Hiroshi Suwa
- Hayato Nakamura as Mitsuo Suwa
- Hisao Dazai as Boss (Umetarō Katsura)
- Gajirō Satō as Genkō
- Chishū Ryū as Gozen-sama
- Seiji Miyaguchi as Shūkichi Takami
- Toshie Takada as Kinuyo
- Motoko Takahashi as Midori

== Critical appraisal ==
Stuart Galbraith IV writes that Tora-san's Lovesick is "another fine entry in this exceptional series", which he calls "one of Japanese cinema's undiscovered treasures". He judges that the troubled relationship between Utako and her father is one of the highlights of the film. According to Galbraith, Seiji Miyaguchi—who played Kyūzō, the sword-fighting expert in Seven Samurai—gives a subtle performance, portraying the father as "intimidating yet clearly well-meaning". The German-language site molodezhnaja gives Tora-san's Lovesick three and a half out of five stars.

== Availability ==
Tora-san's Lovesick was released theatrically on August 3, 1974. In Japan, the film was released on videotape in 1995, and in DVD format in 2005 and 2008.

== Bibliography ==
=== English ===
- "OTOKO WA TSURAI YO TORAJIRO KOI YATSURE (1974)". British Film Institute. Archived from the original on 2012-10-17.
- "OTOKO WA TSURAIYO -KOI YATSURE". Complete Index to World Film.
- Otoko wa tsurai yo: Torajiro koiyatsure (1974) at IMDb
- Galbraith IV, Stuart (2005-10-31). "Tora-san 13: Tora-san's Lovesick (Region 3)". DVD Talk.

=== German ===
- "Tora-San's Lovesick" (in German). www.molodezhnaja.ch.

=== Japanese ===
- 男はつらいよ 寅次郎恋やつれ (1974) (in Japanese). allcinema.net.
- "男はつらいよ 寅次郎恋やつれ". Japanese Cinema Database (Agency for Cultural Affairs). Archived from the original on 2012-02-26.
- 男はつらいよ 寅次郎恋やつれ (in Japanese). Japanese Movie Database.
- 男はつらいよ 寅次郎恋やつれ (in Japanese). Kinema Junpo. Archived from the original on 2012-03-09.
