= Third Base =

- Theatrical release poster

Japanese name
- Kana: サード
- Directed by: Yōichi Higashi
- Written by: Shūji Terayama
- Produced by: Katsuhiro Maeda
- Starring: Toshiyuki Nagashima; Tsugiaki Yoshida; Aiko Morishita
- Cinematography: Koichi Kawakami
- Edited by: Keiko Ichihara
- Music by: Michi Tanaka
- Production company: Art Theatre Guild
- Distributed by: Art Theatre Guild
- Release date: March 15, 1978 (Japan)
- Running time: 102 minutes
- Country: Japan
- Language: Japanese
- Box office: ¥150 million

Third Base (Japanese: サード, Hepburn: Sâdo), also known as Third and The Boy on Third Base, is a 1978 Japanese film directed by Yōichi Higashi and written by Shūji Terayama. It stars Toshiyuki Nagashima in the lead role. The film was produced by Art Theatre Guild and released on March 15, 1978, in Japan.

== Premise ==
High school student Shinji Seno (Toshiyuki Nagashima) and his female friends from the newspaper club, bored with their small town lives, turn to prostitution to earn money to move to the city. However, they run afoul of a local yakuza member. The conflict turns violent, and ends with Shinji beating the man to death. Shinji is sent to a juvenile detention center, where he is given the nickname "Third" because he used to play third base on the high school baseball team.

== Cast ==
- Toshiyuki Nagashima as Shinji Seno, aka "Third"
- Tsugiaki Yoshida as 2b
- Aiko Morishita as Shinbun-bu
- Akiko Shikata as Tenisu-bu
- Chiyoko Shimakura as Third's Mother
- Taketoshi Naito as Judge
- Yuko Katagiri as Woman with Red Sweater
- Tōru Minegishi as Yakuza
- Akira Hanagami as Murakami
- Fumihiko Ikeda as Akira
- Takeshi Wakamatsu as Oshi
- Hajime Nishizuka as Tanka
- Yutaka Nemoto as Tobechin

== Awards and nominations ==
Minister of Education's Art Encouragement Prize for New Artists

- Won

52nd Kinema Junpo Best Ten Awards

- Won: Best Film
- Won: Best Japanese Director (Yōichi Higashi)

3rd Hochi Film Awards

- Won: Best Film

33rd Mainichi Film Awards

- Won: Excellence Film (shared with Empire of Passion, The Love Suicides at Sonezaki and Kaerazaru hibi)
- Won: Best Sound Recording (Yukio Kubota)

21st Blue Ribbon Awards

- Won: Best Film
- Won: Best Newcomer (Toshiyuki Nagashima)
