= Koreans in Japan: Critical Voices from the Margin =

2000 non-fiction book by Sonia Ryang

- Editor: Sonia Ryang
- Genre: Non-fiction
- Publisher: Routledge
- Publication date: 2000

Koreans in Japan: Critical Voices from the Margin is a 2000 book edited by Sonia Ryang and published by Routledge. It discusses Zainichi Koreans in Japan.

== Background ==
Sonia Ryang, born a stateless Zainichi Korean, previously wrote North Koreans in Japan: Language, Ideology, and Identity. She resides in the United States as of 2001.

== Contents ==
The book includes ten essays, each written by a different person. The authors include Japanese scholars and Americans of various ethnic backgrounds, including Japanese origins, Korean origins, and other origins. The former taught in Japan and received their professional training in Anglophone countries. The latter had experience living in Japan.

Chapters 1, 2, and 3 discuss how Zainichi Koreans are defined and how they were excluded from Japanese society.

- "The Politics of Legal Status" by Chikako Kashiwazaki
  - Explores why Koreans residing in Japan for generations do not have Japanese citizenship
- "The North Korean Homeland of Koreans in Japan" by Sonia Ryang
  - It discusses the treatment of Zainichi Koreans by both the North Korean and Japanese governments, including the condition of statelessness and how Zainichi, including some South Korea-origin Zainichi, were repatriated to North Korea. Yasunori Fukuoka (福岡 安則 Fukuoka Yasunori) of Saitama University wrote that "In her scornful disdain for the treatment meted out to these people by both governments, one senses the powerful indignation of a scholar who was herself brought up as a Chongryun Korean."
- "Political Correctness, Postcoloniality, and the Self-Representation of "Koreanness" in Japan" by Koichi Iwabuchi
  - It discusses how awareness of Zainichi Koreans increased after the release of the 1993 film Tsuki wa dotchi ni dete iru ("Where is the Moon?").

Chapters 4, 5, and 6 discuss works of literature. The works discussed are:

- Furuhausu - Yu Miri
- Ikaino Taryon - Chong Ch'u-wǒl
- Yuhi - Yi Jang-ji

The writers of these works are all Zainichi women.

Chapters 7, 8, and 9 discuss the post-World War II education of Zainichi children

- "Kids between Nations: Ethnic Classes in the Construction of Korean Identities in Japanese Public Schools'" by Jeffry T. Hester
- "Korean Children, Textbooks, and Educational Practices in Japanese Primary Schools'." by Reiko Aoki - This essay examines Ningen, a publication edited by members of a Burakumin rights organization that is used by the human rights program of Osaka Prefecture, and a summer school in Hirakata, Osaka Prefecture that caters to Zainichi children. Yoshida argues that the former does not adequately cover Zainichi Korean issues since the editors are excessively focused on Burakumin, and that since the latter does not include ethnic Japanese children it is ineffective.

Hideki Harajiri of Shizuoka University wrote that the analyses use perspectives developed in English-language academia on Japanese materials instead of using perspectives from other language academia.

== Reception ==
Kyeyoung Park of the University of California, Los Angeles wrote that it "is a well-written and much-needed volume on this important topic" and that it "remains a provocative, engagingly written, and insightful book." Park argued that the book should have used "a clearer explanation of the continuing legal and socioeconomic constraints against Koreans", and included "a more balanced discussion in terms of both structure and agency", and given more attention to other marginalized groups such as religious, regional, and economic minorities. Park additionally argued that the chapters were not sufficiently related to one another.

Fukuoka stated that this book "never quite delivers" on establishing "a portrait of the entire Zainichi population", and that it was not as good as North Koreans in Japan.

Harajiri wrote, "I can only conclude that the book contributes to and reaffirms the imbalance of power relations between the English-language and non-English-language academic worlds."

Sarah Soh Chung-Hee of San Francisco State University wrote that the book "is a most welcome addition to the scant literature on the topic in English and makes significant contributions to the knowledge on the important issues of identity in the study of diasporic community."
