= Tokyo Lullaby =

- Poster for Tokyo Lullaby
- 東京夜曲
- Directed by: Jun Ichikawa
- Screenplay by: Shinsuke Sato
- Story by: Jun Ichikawa
- Produced by: Tetsuo Satonaka
- Starring: Kyōzō Nagatsuka; Kaori Momoi; Mitsuko Baisho
- Cinematography: Tatsuhiko Kobayashi
- Edited by: Kanae Ishii
- Music by: Reichi; Kazuto Shimizu
- Production companies: Eisei Gekijo; Kindai Eiga Kyōkai
- Distributed by: Shochiku
- Release date: June 21, 1997 (Japan)
- Running time: 87 minutes
- Country: Japan
- Language: Japanese

Tokyo Lullaby (Japanese: 東京夜曲, Hepburn: Tōkyō yakyoku) is a 1997 Japanese drama film directed by Jun Ichikawa.

== Cast ==
- Kyōzō Nagatsuka as Koichi Hamanaka
- Kaori Momoi as Tami Ohsawa
- Mitsuko Baisho as Hisako Hamanaka
- Satoko Abe as Tomomi Ito
- Kyoko Asagiri as Tami's step mother
- Tokue Hanazawa as Asakura's father
- Koba Hayashi as Hamanaka's father
- Takaya Kamikawa as Sadaji Asakawa
- Reiko Nanao as Hamanaka's mother
- Akira Oizumi as Tomomi's father

== Awards and nominations ==
22nd Hochi Film Award

- Won: Best Supporting Actress - Mitsuko Baisho

40th Blue Ribbon Awards

- Won: Best Actress - Kaori Momoi
- Won: Best Supporting Actress - Mitsuko Baisho

Kinema Junpo Awards

- Won: Best Actress - Kaori Momoi
- Won: Best Supporting Actress - Mitsuko Baisho

Mainichi Film Awards

- Won: Best Actress - Kaori Momoi
- Won: Best Supporting Actress - Mitsuko Baisho
