= Boku no ojisan =

- Film poster
- Directed by: Yōichi Higashi
- Screenplay by: Yōichi Higashi
- Story by: Tetsujiro Yamagami
- Produced by: Mitsuyoshi Hayashi; Koshiro Sho; Eiji Watanabe; Tetsujiro Yamagami
- Starring: Michitaka Tsutsui; Takahito Hosoyamada; Miho Tsumiki; Yoichiro Aoi; Akemi Omori
- Cinematography: Takahiro Tsutai
- Edited by: Yōichi Higashi
- Music by: Ashley McClusack
- Production company: SIGLO Ltd.
- Distributed by: SIGLO Ltd.
- Release date: May 13, 2000 (Japan)
- Running time: 116 minutes
- Country: Japan
- Language: Japanese

Boku no ojisan (ボクの、おじさん THE CROSSING; lit. My Uncle THE CROSSING), also known as The Crossing, is a 2000 Japanese coming of age drama film directed by Yōichi Higashi, with a screenplay written by Higashi from a story by Tetsujiro Yamagami. The film depicts the burgeoning friendship between a 29-year-old man frustrated with city life and his 14 year old nephew. It marks the final installment of Higashi's thematic "Boy and River" trilogy, which includes The River with No Bridge and Village of Dreams. Boku no ojisan stars Michitaka Tsutsui in the lead role, in addition to Takahito Hosoyamada (in his feature film debut), Miho Tsumiki, Yoichiro Aoi and Akemi Omori. Ashley McClusack composed the film's score, while its theme song "Frozen World" was performed by Yōsui Inoue. The film also features the songs "MacDougall's Pride" by Ashley MacIsaac and "If" by Pink Floyd; the latter marks the first time a Japanese film was allowed to feature a Floyd song on its soundtrack. Boku no ojisan played in the Panorama section at the 50th Berlin International Film Festival, and was also shown at the 16th Film Fest Gent, before being theatrically released by SIGLO Ltd. on May 13, 2000, in Japan.

== Plot ==
Koji, a graphic designer in Tokyo, is 29 years old and frustrated with life. His girlfriend Rin disappears for months at a time, and he is having issues at work. One day, he receives two pieces of bad news from his brother, Shuichi, who calls from their parents' home in rural Kumamoto Prefecture. The first is the death of their father, and the second is that Shuichi's only son, Takuya, a 14 year old junior high school student, has been arrested trying to rob the post office. Koji feels overwhelmed by this news. Nonetheless, he decides to return to his hometown (which he has not visited in years) to attend his father's funeral. He rides there on his Harley-Davidson motorcycle.

Assuming that Takuya was acting out after his grandfather's death, the police release him on probation. When he returns home, Takuya does not open up to his parents, who are going through a divorce. Koji arrives and asks his nephew why he did it, but the boy does not open up to him either. Nevertheless, Koji sees himself in Takuya. He believes he can reach the boy, as he seems to have similar problems that Koji once had as a kid.

At first, Takuya refuses to talk with Koji at all. This initially frustrates Koji, who feels empty after the loss of his father. But gradually, Koji breaks down Takuya's defenses. Takuya, who has felt lost and directionless in his small town, begins to see Koji as a role model, especially after Koji teaches the boy how to ride his motorcycle. As their friendship blooms, Koji recalls his own boyhood. In particular, he remembers the time he swam across Kuma River, considered a rite of passage in the town. It was the moment when Koji realized that he had become an adult. Takuya, inspired by his uncle's memories, takes on the challenge of crossing the river alone. He succeeds, and the two celebrate his success. Takuya feels like he is becoming an adult.

Koji finally feels a sense of peace through the healing properties of nature, and re-examines himself through his interactions with his nephew. After the funeral, feeling restored, Koji says goodbye and returns to his life in Tokyo.

== Cast ==
- Michitaka Tsutsui as Koji Kawaguchi
- Takahito Hosoyamada as Takuya Kawaguchi
- Miho Tsumiki as Rin Makihara
- Yoichiro Aoi as Shuichi Kawaguchi
- Akemi Omori as Teruko Kawaguchi
- Satoko Abe as Etsuko Yabe
- Tomoko Nakajima as Tomoko Tsuzuki
- Hiromitsu Suzuki as Director Izawa
- Ryudo Uzaki as The Homeless/Masked Man

== Release ==
Boku no ojisan was theatrically released by SIGLO Ltd. on May 13, 2000, in Japan. The film was later released to DVD on October 26, 2013.

== Reception ==
Phillip Bergson of Screen Daily wrote that the film is "full of rich details about everyday Japanese life," and that "Many gentle comic touches enliven the narrative." He also compared it to Takeshi Kitano's Kikujiro.

Writing for Variety, Derek Elley stated that, though the film contained "some of the same gentle, meditative feel... as there was in Yoichi Higashi’s previous [film] Village of Dreams", he believed that it "[lacked] the studied rural beauty and period setting that made the latter so attractive to arthouse auds." Elley also said that the film is an "over-elusive pic that too often slips like sand through your fingers."

== Awards and nominations ==
15th Fribourg International Film Festival

- Nominated: Grand Prix (Yōichi Higashi)
