= No More Easy Life =

- Poster for No More Easy Life.

Japanese name
- Kanji: もう頬づえはつかない
- Directed by: Yōichi Higashi
- Written by: Tatsuo Kobayashi; Yōichi Higashi
- Based on: Mo hozue wa tsukanai by Noriko Minobe
- Produced by: Hidehiro Kudo; Shosuke Taga; Takashi Arima
- Starring: Kaori Momoi; Eiji Okuda; Leo Morimoto
- Cinematography: Kôichi Kawakami
- Edited by: Keiko Ichihara
- Music by: Michi Tanaka
- Production company: Art Theatre Guild
- Distributed by: Art Theatre Guild
- Release date: December 25, 1979 (Japan)
- Running time: 112 minutes
- Country: Japan
- Language: Japanese
- Box office: ¥400 million

No More Easy Life (Japanese: もう頬づえはつかない, Hepburn: Mo hozue wa tsukanai) is a 1979 Japanese drama film co-written and directed by Yōichi Higashi, based on a novel of the same name by Noriko Minobe. The film stars Kaori Momoi as Mariko, a college student in the 1970s attempting to navigate her relationships with two different men. It co-stars Eiji Okuda, Leo Morimoto and Juzo Itami. The film's self-titled theme song was performed by Sachi Arai, with lyrics by Shūji Terayama.

No More Easy Life was released by Art Theatre Guild on December 25, 1979, in Japan, where it was a financial success. Momoi won several awards for her performance in the film.

== Premise ==
Mariko, a '70s college student, is torn between part-time jobs, schoolwork, her ex-boyfriend and a sensitive new acquaintance. The film explores her attempts to manage her troubled relationships with the two men and forge her own path in life.

== Cast ==
- Kaori Momoi as Mariko
- Eiji Okuda as Hashimoto
- Leo Morimoto as Tsuneo
- Juzo Itami as Takamizawa the Landlord
- Sakura Kamo as Tokiko
- Akemi Negishi as Mariko's Mother
- Junkichi Orimoto as Mariko's Father
- Mitsue Isa as Yumiko
- Naomi Tokura as Haruko
- Hiroaki Murakami as Pick-Up Man – Murakami's debut role.

== Release ==
Art Theatre Guild released No More Easy Life on December 25, 1979, in Japan, where it was a financial success. ATG's 1980 operating income surplus, its first in 12 years, was credited to the film's box office success.

== Awards and nominations ==
22nd Blue Ribbon Awards

- Won: Best Actress - Kaori Momoi (also won for Heaven Sent)

34th Mainichi Film Awards

- Won: Excellence Film (shared with Shōdō Satsujin Musuko Yo, The Man Who Stole the Sun and Vengeance Is Mine)
- Won: Best Actress – Kaori Momoi

3rd Japan Academy Awards

- Won: Outstanding Performance by an Actress in a Leading Role – Kaori Momoi (also won for Heaven Sent)

53rd Kinema Junpo Best Ten Awards

- Won: Best Actress – Kaori Momoi
