= Akitsu Springs =

1962 film

- Original Japanese poster
- Directed by: Yoshishige Yoshida
- Written by: Yoshishige Yoshida (screenplay); Shinji Fujiwara (novel)
- Produced by: Masao Shirai
- Starring: Mariko Okada; Hiroyuki Nagato
- Cinematography: Toichiro Narushima
- Edited by: Yoshi Sugihara
- Music by: Hikaru Hayashi
- Production company: Shochiku
- Distributed by: Shochiku
- Release date: June 15, 1962 (Japan)
- Running time: 112 minutes
- Country: Japan
- Language: Japanese

Akitsu Springs (Japanese: 秋津温泉, Hepburn: Akitsu onsen) is a 1962 Japanese drama film directed by Yoshishige Yoshida, starring Mariko Okada and Hiroyuki Nagato.

== Plot ==
Shortly before the end of World War II, young soldier Shusaku, ill with tuberculosis, arrives at Akitsu, expecting to die soon. Shinko, daughter of a widow and innkeeper, helps him to recover and invigorates his will to live. They fall in love, and although she is first willing to follow him when he suggests to commit suicide together, they eventually let go of their plan. Shinko muses to marry Shusaku, but her mother intervenes and sends him away. Over a span of 17 years, Shusaku, now married and a father, continues to meet with Shinko, but also has affairs with other women. During their last encounters, she declares that she is now ready to die with him, but Shusaku is reluctant. When he leaves Akitsu again after a visit, Shinko, who has sold her inn and is tired of living, commits suicide alone, later found by the grieving Shusaku.

== Cast ==
- Mariko Okada as Shinko
- Hiroyuki Nagato as Shusaku Kawamoto
- Jūkichi Uno as Kenkichi Matsumiya
- Eijirō Tōno as Priest
- Kei Taguchi
- Asao Koike as Osaki
- Akira Nagoya as Shimamura
- Sō Yamamura as Mikami
- Taiji Tonoyama as Rokusuke

== Production ==
Akitsu Springs was Mariko Okada's 100th film and the first under the direction of her future husband Yoshida.

== Awards ==
- 1962 Kinema Junpo Award for Best Actress for Mariko Okada
- 1962 Mainichi Film Award for Best Actress for Mariko Okada

== Home media ==
Akitsu Springs was released on DVD in France in 2008 and in Japan in 2013 as part of DVD boxes with collected works by Yoshida.
