= She and He (1963 film) =

1963 Japanese film by Susumu Hani

- Poster for She and He.
- Directed by: Susumu Hani
- Written by: Susumu Hani; Kunio Shimizu
- Produced by: Teizô Koguchi; Masayuki Nakajima
- Starring: Sachiko Hidari; Eiji Okada
- Cinematography: Juichi Nagano
- Edited by: Noriaki Tsuchimoto
- Music by: Tōru Takemitsu
- Release date: 18 October 1963
- Running time: 109 minutes
- Country: Japan
- Language: Japanese

She and He (彼女と彼, Kanojo to kare), also known as He and She, is a 1963 Japanese drama film directed by Susumu Hani and starring Sachiko Hidari, Kikuji Yamashita and Eiji Okada. It was written by Hani and Kunio Shimizu.

== Plot ==
Naoko Ishikawa is middle-class woman in Tokyo, living with her husband Eiichi in a shining new apartment building on a hill overlooking a slum. As Eiichi becomes more entangled in his life as businessman, Naoko looks for ways to expand her own life. She loses her sense of security when she becomes acquainted with poverty in her neighborhood. She finds herself strangely drawn to Ikona, once a university friend of her husband, and now a rag-picker, who lives in the slum below her apartment building in a tin shack with a blind child and a dog, and the sheltering comforts of her middle-class existence fall away.

== Cast ==
- Sachiko Hidari as Naoko Ishikawa
- Kikuji Yamashita as Ikona
- Eiji Okada as Eiichi Ishikawa
- Akio Hasegawa as laundry boy
- Yoshimi Hiramatsu as Nakano
- Setsuko Horikoshi as old lady of book store
- Takanobu Hozumi as doctor
- Hiromi Ichida as nurse
- Mariko Igarashi as blind girl
- Hiro Kasai as ghetto guy
- Shûji Kawabe as detective
- Toshie Kimura as Sasaki
- Masakazu Kuwayama as laundry owner
- Toshio Matsumoto as laundry man
- Yukio Ninagawa as balloon guy
- Kazuya Oguri
- Miyoko Takahashi as ghetto woman

== Reception ==
The Monthly Film Bulletin wrote: "What is universal about suburbia is so succinctly captured here that one is scarcely if at all conscious of an Eastern as opposed to a Western way of life. Here are all the pressures affecting today's affluent middle classes, the comforts and the isolation, the need to erect barriers of all kinds between people (from the fence that keeps the unsavoury neighbours out, to the conventional reticence that prevents the average housewife from talking overmuch to the laundry boy). Granted that Naoko is naive about the whole thing; regardiess of social distinctions, nobody's husband is likely to encourage his wife's interest in another man. But what the film is really saying is that Naoko's environment inevitably inhibits her natural inclinations for involvement with people, and this is something that can be argued about suburban society in Tokyo, London or New York.

The New Statesman wrote: "This slow-paced, enthralling piece of contemporary japonaiserie circles round a gentle young wife, Naoko (Sachiko Hidari), whose orphan childhood has left her with lunatic, generous impulses. She collects waifs, beggars, compulsively. When the laundry-boy drops some shirts in the dirt, she shoulders the blame; she tries to organise and mitigate the local kids' wargames; she utterly befriends a simple minded rag-picker and his blind adopted daughter, camping out on a site near the posh block of flats in which she lives. Certainly there is something sugared and suspect in such altruism and possibly the film is not fully aware of how off-putting its smiling little heroine sometimes becomes. ... As the wild beggar, Ikona, and his no less wild dog began to move in on little Naoko's calm flat, I was reminded of that fine novel by Saul Bellow, The Victim. She and He may be read as a parable about the limits of guilt, the hazards of love.

Variety wrote: "With a delicate touch and a highly sensitive approach, director Susumu Hani has lifted a simple yarn about a lonely middle-class wife who is attracted to a junk peddler on to a high, artistic plane. ... The portrait of the wife Is tenderly etched by Sachiko Hildari; it is a superb performance, rich in contrasting qualities, and notable for its consistent sincerity. The junk man is played by a screen newcomer, Kikuji Yamashita, with considerable authority. He displays more screen expertise than many experienced actors. Eiji Okada has less scope as the husband, but fills a difficult role with understanding. Mariko Igarashi, an amateur from a blind institute, makes the blind girl an appealing character. Neighbors at the apartment house and on the compound are played by non-pros, too, but they all respond to the director's guidance. Excellent camerawork and a subtle score set the high technical standard, though tauter editing would help."

In the New York Times, Howard Thompson wrote: "She and He is a strangely satisfying little picture. In a rapid-fire flow of images and splintery bits and pieces of incident that level off in a singular, sure direction, Mr, Hani has drawn together a curiously compelling microcosm of a young Tokyo housewife confronting unfamiliar reality. The result is a film fragment, but a snug, interesting one."

Boxoffice called the film: "a disturbing and 'in-depth' probing of loneliness."

== Awards ==
The film was entered into the 1964 14th Berlin International Film Festival where Sachiko Hidari won the Silver Bear for Best Actress award. The film was nominated for Golden Bear, but won OCIC Award and Youth Film Award for best feature film. In Japan, Hidari won Best Actress at Blue Ribbon Award, Mainichi Film Award and Kinema Junpo Award.
