= Yōichi Higashi =

Japanese film director (1934–2026)

- Born: 14 November 1934; Kimino, Wakayama Prefecture, Japan
- Died: 21 January 2026 (aged 91)
- Occupation: Film director

Yōichi Higashi (東陽一, Higashi Yōichi; 14 November 1934 – 21 January 2026) was a Japanese film director. He began his career working on documentaries at Iwanami Productions but, after going independent, turned to fiction film. He won the Directors Guild of Japan New Directors Award for Yasashii Nipponjin in 1971, and then the award for Best Director at the 17th Hochi Film Awards for The River with No Bridge.

In 1996, he won the Silver Bear for an outstanding single achievement at the 46th Berlin International Film Festival for the film Village of Dreams.

Higashi died on 21 January 2026, at the age of 91.

== Filmography ==
- A Face (1963, short film)
- Higashimurayama City (1964, short film)
- Okinawa rettô, aka Okinawa Islands (1969)
- Yasashii Nipponjin, aka The Gentle Japanese (1971)
- Nippon yôkaiden - Satori, aka A Japanese Demon (1973)
- Third Base (1978)
- No More Easy Life (1979)
- Shiki Natsuko (1980)
- Manon (1981)
- Love Letter (1981)
- The Rape (1982)
- Jealousy Game (1982)
- The Second Love (1983)
- Wangan Doro, aka Gulf Road, aka The Wangan Road (1984)
- Keshin (1986)
- Ureshi Hazukashi Monogatari (1988)
- Blown by the Wind (1989)
- Karakuri Doll Woman (1989)
- The River with No Bridge (1992)
- The Day the Circus Comes (1993, short film)
- Can You See the Monster (1994)
- The Image of Japan in Asian Films (1995)
- Village of Dreams (1996)
- Boku no ojisan, aka The Crossing (2000)
- My Grandpa (2003)
- Fuon, aka The Crying Wind (2004)
- Watashi no chôkyô nikki (2010)
- Nâsu Natsuko no atsui natsu, aka Nurse Natsuko's Hot Summer (2010)
- Yoi ga sametara, uchi ni kaero, aka Wandering Home (2010)
- Mad Sultry Sisters (2011)
- Dareka no Mokkin (2016)
