= Station to Heaven =

- Original Japanese poster

Japanese name
- Kanji: 天国の駅
- Directed by: Masanobu Deme
- Written by: Akira Hayasaka
- Starring: Sayuri Yoshinaga; Toshiyuki Nishida; Tomokazu Miura
- Cinematography: Masahiko Iimura
- Edited by: Kiyoaki Saitô
- Music by: Makoto Yano
- Production company: Toei Company
- Release date: June 9, 1984 (Japan)
- Running time: 133 minutes
- Country: Japan
- Language: Japanese

Station to Heaven (Japanese: 天国の駅, Hepburn: Tengoku no eki; lit. Heaven Station) is a 1984 Japanese film directed by Masanobu Deme.

== Plot ==
In 1971, a woman named Kayo faces execution on death row. 15 years earlier, we find out how she ends up there.

== Cast ==
- Sayuri Yoshinaga as Kayo
- Toshiyuki Nishida as Tagawa
- Tomokazu Miura as Kouichi
- Kimie Shingyoji as Sachico
- Kayoko Shiraishi as Tatsue
- Midori Yamamoto as Haruko
- Hirohisa Nakata as Samukawa
- Nobuyoshi Araki as Photographer
- Tetsurō Tamba
- Masahiko Tsugawa
- Chū Takatsuki
- Toshie Kokabu
- Junji Masuda
- Osamu Kimura
- Masanobu Ōkubo
- Makoto Kakeda
- Gōzō Sōma
- Michio Kida
- Genji Kawai
- Hisako Yaohara
- Ryō Suga
- Fukunosuke Izumi
- Chikara Gonoue
- Tatsuya Kameyama
- Sakae Yamaura
- Teruo Shimizu
- Sayoko Tanimoto
- Keiko Itō
- Haruki Jo
- Toshizō Kudō
- Toru Takeuchi
- Kōichi Yamada
- Toyonori Murazoe
- Katsuo Nakamura

== Awards and nominations ==
9th Hochi Film Awards

- Won: Best Actress - Sayuri Yoshinaga

8th Japan Academy Prize

- Won: Best Actress - Sayuri Yoshinaga

60th Kinema Junpo Awards

- Won: Best Actress - Sayuri Yoshinaga

49th Mainichi Film Awards

- Won: Best Actress - Sayuri Yoshinaga
