= The Far Road =

1977 film

- Directed by: Sachiko Hidari
- Written by: Ken Miyamoto
- Starring: Sachiko Hidari
- Cinematography: Junichi Segawa
- Release date: 11 September 1977
- Running time: 114 minutes
- Country: Japan
- Language: Japanese

The Far Road (遠い一本の道, Toi ippon no michi) is a 1977 Japanese film directed by and starring Sachiko Hidari. It was entered into the 28th Berlin International Film Festival.

== Cast ==
- Sachiko Hidari
- Yoshie Ichige
- Hisashi Igawa
