= Mainichi Film Award for Best Supporting Actress =

Annual Japanese film award

- Awarded for: Best supporting actress of the year
- Country: Japan
- First award: 1951

The Mainichi Film Award for Best Supporting Actress is a film award given at the Mainichi Film Awards.

== Award winners ==
Year	Film	Actress
1951	Jiyū Gakkō; Shōnenki	Akiko Tamura
1952	Oka wa Hanazakari; Mother; Lightning	Chieko Nakakita
1953	An Inlet of Muddy Water; Tokyo Story	Haruko Sugimura
1954	The Garden of Women; Kono Hiroi Sora no Dokokani; Aku no Tanoshisa; Okuman Chōja	Yoshiko Kuga
1955	Jinsei Tonbo Gaeri; Ofukuro	Sachiko Hidari
1956	Street of Shame; Taiyō to Bara; Gendai no Yokubō; A Wife's Heart	Sadako Sawamura
1957	Stepbrothers; Nyotai wa Kanashiku; Chijō	Kinuyo Tanaka
1958	Akujo no Kisetsu	Mariko Okada
1959	Saijo Kishitsu; My Second Brother	Kazuko Yoshiyuki
1960	Her Brother	Kinuyo Tanaka
1961	The End of Summer; Minami no Kaze to Nami	Michiyo Aratama
1962	The Broken Commandment; An Autumn Afternoon; Shinobi no Mono	Kyōko Kishida
1963	Echizen Take Ningyō	Tamao Nakamura
1964	Unholy Desire; Onna no Uzu to Fuchi to Nagare	Yuko Kusunoki
1965	Shōnin no Isu	Tomoko Naraoka
1966	The Pornographers	Sumiko Sakamoto
1967	Onna no Isshō; Harubiyori	Sachiko Hidari
1968	The House of the Sleeping Beauties; Onna to Misoshiru; Kamo to Negi	Hisano Yamaoka
1969	Boy	Akiko Koyama
1970	Chi no Mure; Dodes'ka-den	Tomoko Naraoka
1971-1982	N/A	N/A
1983	The Family Game	Saori Yuki
1984	Jo no Mai; W's Tragedy	Yoshiko Mita
1985	Usugeshō	Mariko Fuji
1986	A Promise	Sachiko Murase
1987	Chōchin	Eri Ishida
1988	The Discarnates	Kumiko Akiyoshi
1989	Dotsuitarunen; Harasu no Ita Hi	Haruko Sagara
1990	The Cherry Orchard	Miho Tsumiki
1991	Nowhere Man	Jun Fubuki
1992	The Strange Tale of Oyuki	Nobuko Otowa
1993	Moving	Junko Sakurada
1994	Ghost Pub	Shigeru Muroi
1995	The Stairway to the Distant Past; Tokyo Deluxe; The House of the Sleeping Beauties	Haruko Wanibuchi
1996	Shall We Dance?	Reiko Kusamura
1997	Tokyo Lullaby; The Eel	Mitsuko Baisho
1998	A Class to Remember 3: The New Voyage; Wait and See	Kimiko Yo
1999	Atsumono	Hijiri Kojima
2000	Sakuya Yōkaiden; Honjitsu Matamata Kyūshin Nari	Keiko Matsuzaka
2001	By Player	Keiko Oginome
2002	The Twilight Samurai; Utsutsu	Rie Miyazawa
2003	Akame 48 Waterfalls; Zatōichi	Michiyo Okusu
2004	The Hidden Blade; Blood and Bones	Tomoko Tabata
2005	A Stranger of Mine	Yuka Itaya
2006	Hula Girls; Rainbow Song; Honey and Clover	Yū Aoi
2007	Fumiko no Umi	Keiko Takahashi
2008	Grave of the Fireflies	Keiko Matsuzaka
2009	Dear Doctor	Kaoru Yachigusa
2010	The Lone Scalpel	Yui Natsukawa
2011	Rebirth	Hiromi Nagasaku
2012	Ai to Makoto	Sakura Ando
2013	The Story of Yonosuke	Yuriko Yoshitaka
2014	The Light Shines Only There	Chizuru Ikewaki
2015	Our Little Sister	Masami Nagasawa
2016	Shin Godzilla	Mikako Ichikawa
2017	Dear Etranger	Rena Tanaka
2018	Shoplifters	Kirin Kiki
2019	Another World	Chizuru Ikewaki
2020	True Mothers	Aju Makita
2021	In the Wake	Kaya Kiyohara
2022	Missing	Aoi Itō
2023	Kyrie	Suzu Hirose
