= The Woman-Killer and the Hell of Oil =

Bunraku play by Chikamatsu Monzaemon

The Woman-Killer and the Hell of Oil (女殺油地獄, Onnagoroshi abura no jigoku) is a Bunraku play by Chikamatsu Monzaemon, also performed in kabuki.

The play was first performed August 9, 1721 on the bunraku stage. It is supposedly based on actual events that were said to have taken place the night before Boy's Festival in 1721; however, little is known about the crime. The play was not well-received when it was first performed, and it was only during the end of the nineteenth century that the play began to be considered a masterpiece and started to be performed frequently. While originally written for bunraku it was successfully staged in kabuki in a revival in 1909 by Jitsukawa Enjaku II. It is the only sewamono (contemporary setting plays in Japanese traditional theatre) to feature a murderer as the 'hero' role.

== Plot ==
The Woman-Killer and the Hell of Oil is a play in three acts. The main character is Yohei, a 23 year old oil merchant, who frequently runs up debts and spends a lot of time in the licensed quarter.

=== Act One ===
The first act takes place as pilgrims are traveling to the Temple of Kanzeon in Nozaki. Waxy of Aizu is a rich customer who has fallen in love with Kogiku, a courtesan of the Flower House, in the Sonezaki licensed quarter. He takes her on a boat ride to Nozaki to see the temple. They disembark at Sarara just before Nozaki.

Along comes Okichi, age 27, and her three daughters, the oldest one being nine. The middle child, Okiyo, who is six, asks to stop for tea at a nearby stall. Okichi agrees so that they can wait for her husband, an oil merchant named Teshimaya Shichizaemon, to catch up with them. As they are resting, along comes their neighbor, Yohei, who lives with his parents in a house diagonal to Okichi's. Yohei has come with some fellow oil merchants who are his friends.

Seeing Yohei, Okichi asks him and his friends to join her. Okichi finds out that Yohei is waiting to catch Kogiku, who rejected his offer to go on the pilgrimage, giving the reason that Nozaki was in an unlucky direction so he refused to go. Okichi then chastises Yohei for his behavior, using the pilgrimage as an excuse, and spending so much time in the licensed quarter. She tells him of all the rumors about him and how he frequently runs up debts. Okichi then leaves money for the drinks and goes on ahead.

Kogiku and Waxy then approach the tea stand. At first they do not notice Yohei and his friends, but when Kogiku does, she tries to get away. However, Yohei is too quick and pulls her to a bench outside the tea house. Yohei then berates Kogiku for going out with another customer after declining his invitation. Kogiku, however, says that she only did it because of the rumors circulating about Yohei and herself. She promises she loves him and whispers sweet nothings into his ear. Waxy then sits down next to the two of them, aggravated. He presses Kogiku to repeat what she told him last night. Yohei's friends then prepare to fling mud at Waxy. Waxy then kicks them, knocking one out and he splashes in the water. The other is kicked in the groin and doubles over in pain. Yohei joins the fight, and they trade punches. They eventually both crash into the river and throw mud and reeds at one another.

At the same time, a samurai named Oguri Hachiya is visiting the temple in the name of his lord Takatsuki. He is escorted by a procession of foot soldiers who cry out, "Make way! Make way!" However, Yohei continues to sling mud. Some splatters on the samurai and his horse. Waxy heads to the other bank and escapes, while Yohei is surrounded. Head of the foot soldiers, Yamamoto Moriemon, is Yohei's uncle. Since Yohei has caused such a disgrace, he decides to cut off Yohei's head. Oguri Hachiya stops him since the sight of blood would ruin the pilgrimage. Yamamoto Moriemon instead decides to do it on the way back.

Yohei is left in shock and cannot find the way back to Osaka so that he can escape. Just then Okichi has turned back since the crowd was so large, and was deciding to wait at the tea house again for her husband. Yohei begs for her help. Okichi decides to help him and wipe down his kimono, and they enter the tea house.

Okichi's husband, Teshimaya Shichizaemon, finally comes along. Okiyo, his daughter, sees him, and he asks where her mother is. Okiyo says she is with Yohei and they have taken off their sashes and kimonos. Shichizaemon grows angry, thinking that his wife is having an affair with Yohei. He orders them to come out of the tea house. Okichi comes out, thankful that her husband has finally caught up with them. Yohei expresses his gratitude for Okichi's help. Yohei's face is still covered in mud. Shichizaemon chastises his wife for not thinking about what people would say if they saw the two of them together wiping him down.

Thus Shichizaemon, Okichi, and their three daughters leave to go to the temple. Yohei hears the cries of "Make way! Make way!" as Oguri Hachiya are returning from the temple. Yohei tries to get away, but is caught by his uncle Moriemon. Oguri Hachiya though tells him to let Yohei go since he has changed and no longer has mud on him. Yohei is spared.

=== Act Two ===
Act Two takes place at the Kawachi-ya, an oil shop in Osaka tree days before the Boys' Festival. Pilgrims who have just returned from a mountain pilgrimage talk to Tokubei and Osawa, Yohei's stepfather and mother. Tokubei is not Yohei's biological father, and instead was a servant of Yohei's father; after he died he married Osawa and took over the oil shop. Osawa mentions that their daughter, Okachi, has been sick with a cold for over a week. The pilgrims mention a mountain priest named White Fox who can cure her. After the pilgrims depart, Tahei (Yohei's older brother) arrives bearing a letter from their Uncle Moriemon mentioning the incident with Yohei in Act One and that he can no longer serve his master and will be traveling to Osaka. Tahei tells his parents to throw Yohei out once and for all. However, Tokubei is self-conscious of his position as stepfather and the former servant of Yohei's late father. Still Tahei tells him to disinherit Yohei.

Okachi cries out in anguish and the mountain priest arrives as Tahei then exits. Osawa is also out getting medicine for Okachi. Yohei then arrives and degrades the priest, stating that the sickness Okachi has is mortal and that the best doctor could not hope to cure it. He then lies to Tokubei, stating that he met his Uncle Moreimon and that his uncle has embezzled three kamme of silver; if he cannot return the money by the holidays he will be forced to commit seppuku. Tokubei knows that Yohei is lying due to having just read the letter that Tahei delivered from the uncle. He says that he does not have any money to lend and if Yohei is so interested in helping, he should liquidate his assets.

Yohei then sprawls out on the floor playing with an abacus as the priest examines Okachi. The priest determines that her sickness is from her melancholy arising from the desire to get married. As the priest is about to start the prayer, Okachi speaks in a trance, stating that the way to cure her is to call off the wedding engagement and that Yohei's debts and pain bring her agony. She asks that they redeem the woman Yohei loves (Kogiku) and let her be his bride and give him his own household. The priest then attempts to exorcise the demon. Yohei, however, springs to his feet and pushes the priest from the room. The priest attempts to come back into the room; every time he does, Yohei casts him out again. Finally, the priest gives up and Yohei goes over to Tokubei begging that he listen to what Okachi said.

However, Tokubei refutes it, saying that if he redeems the prostitute that Yohei loves, he will destroy the families and will be unable to pray for Yohei's late father. Yohei then asks if it is his intention to get a husband for Okachi and give him the household, which Tokubei confirms. Yohei kicks Tokubei in anger, who falls, and Yohei continues to stomp on him. Okachi clings to Yohei and begs him to stop. She then confesses that she was not actually sick but was acting as Yohei had asked her to. Yohei is angry that she revealed their secret; he then kicks her down as well and continues to kick them both. Osawa returns and cries out in dismay. She seizes Yohei by the hair and hits him in the face as she wipes away tears. She berates him, saying that he should respect his father and sister. Osawa then casts Yohei out and disinherits him. Okachi begs their mother not to do it and to forgive Yohei. Osawa then berates Tokubei for not standing up for himself. Osawa grabs a pole in order to drive Yohei from the house, but he quickly tears it away from her and uses it to attack her. Tokubei steps in and attacks Yohei in return, his eyes glaring with rage while holding back tears. Tokubei then reveals that he had no intention to find a husband for Okachi and that it was merely a ruse in order to try and motivate Yohei. He says he has cared for Yohei like a real father, yet Yohei has shown nothing but selfishness and beats his own mother and sister. He then breaks down in tears, dropping the pole. Osawa, picking it up once more, chases Yohei from the shop, despite attempts from Okachi to stop her. Finally Yohei crosses the threshold and leaves.

As Yohei walks away, he checks his money pouch to see how much he has left. However, noticing that Tokubei is coming out of the shop, he quickly puts it away and walks away. Tokubei, seeing him leave, breaks down in tears, commenting that as the years pass Yohei looks more and more like that of the late master. He comments that he feels that he is not driving away Yohei, but his master himself and that he is heartbroken. Osawa, though she called Yohei a villain, can no longer fight back the tears either and attempts to catch a glance of Yohei though he is now too far away.

=== Act Three ===
Act Three takes place on the evening of the Boys' Festival at the Teshima-ya, the oil shop owned by Shichizae-mon, the husband of Okichi.

Shichizae-mon, with 7/10ths of his bill collecting accomplished, returns home before starting out again. Okichi remarks that he is home early and that she has taken care of the household account. However, Shichizae-mon comments that the night's work is not yet finished and he must return once more to finish. Okichi states that he has done enough for the night and can finish collecting after the holiday. However, Shichizae-mon says that if he does not collect it tonight, it will never be collected. He hands her his money belt containing 580 me of new silver and asks her to lock it up in the cupboard for him, stating that he will be home soon. Okiku, their daughter, then goes to pour her father some sake before he leaves—both of them standing. Okichi, seeing this, mentions that he should know better than to stand while drinking sake otherwise he will send someone to their grave, and he quickly sits down as a result. After finishing his sake he takes his leave. Okichi then puts her children to bed.

Yohei is outside, wearing an old kimono with sleeves too short for him; a dagger is concealed at his waist. He peeps in at the Teshima-ya, as a voice calls out to him. It is the moneylender Kohei from the cotton shop in Uemachi. He has been looking for Yohei to try and collect a debt and found out that his parents cast him out. However, Tokubei's seal was on the debt note; Kohei has decided that if he does not get his kamme in new silver by tonight, he will denounce him to the authorities. Yohei mentions that while the figure on the one is one kamme, Yohei only received 200 me (about 1/5th of one kamme). Koehi says that if he can return the 200 me by 6 o'clock in the morning, he will not cause any trouble. However, if he does not have the money by that time, the debt shall be one kamme and he will have Tokubei pay it. Youhei promises that he will have the money, saying that he is a man of his word. Kohei says if he still needs money after paying him back, he will lend it to him and then departs. However, Yohei has not a cent on him. Yohei must find the 200 me somewhere.

Yohei hears a sound behind him, and noticing Tokubei coming, he hides. Tokubei enters Teshima-ya to find Okichi. Tokubei mentions that he has disinherited Yohei but talks at length that he could be in trouble with debt as it is collection day and Yohei could get desperate. He asks Okichi if she sees Yohei to ask him to apologize to his mother and return home, saying that he has decided to forgive him. Tokubei chokes with tears but pretends that smoke from his pipe has gotten in his eyes. Okichi asks him to stay until her husband returns, but Tokubei does not want to take up his time. He gets out his wallet and takes out 300 mon saying that he got it without his wife looking. He gives the money to Okichi, asking her to give it to Youhei if she sees him and begging her to not let Yohei know that it was him who gave the money.

Another voice is heard and Tokubei attempts to hide, but Osawa, who is the newly arrived visitor, sees him. Yohei has been watching and listening in from outside where he has been hiding. Osawa asks Tokubei why he is here when Shichizae-mon is gone. He talks down to him for not taking his wife and daughter more seriously and doting on Yohei too much. However, Tokubei states that a parent will always love their child. Tokubei says that if he must leave, they leave together, and as he pulls on her kimono sleeve, something falls to the floor. It is chimaki, a sweet normally eaten at the Boys' Festival, and 500 mon. Osawa throws herself on the money, stating how embarrassing it is, her voice rising in grief. She then begs for forgiveness from Tokubei for she stole the money from their own accounts in order to give to Yohei. She mentions that how can she hate Yohei, his own mother. She is sure that he is so wicked because of some deed she committed in her past life. Mentioning her overwhelming guilt at casting Yohei out. Tokubei forgives her and they both cry, and finally Tokubei tells her to leave the money and food with Okichi so that she may give it to Yohei. Okichi understands and says she shall deliver it, and the two depart together.

After seeing his parents depart, Yohei nods to himself and hides his dagger. He then enters the Teshima-ya, calling out to Okichi. Okichi mentions that 800 mon and chimaki have fallen from heaven with the command that she give it to Yohei. Yohei says that he knows his parents gave him the money since he was listening in the whole time saying he wept through it all. Okichi asks if he has finally understood what his parents have gone through. Yohei says he has, stating that he will become a good son and devote his strength to serving his parents. However, he says that the gift of money from his parents is not enough to cover the debts that he is in. He begs Okichi to lend him 200 me and says that he will repay her as soon as his parents call off his disinheritance. Okichi says that Yohei's words betray him and he has not reformed. Further, stating that while she has 500 me in the safe, it is not within her power to lend a single copper while her husband is away. She says that on the day of pilgrimage she was washing his clothes and was suspected of improper conduct. Yohei begs her to lend the money to him, but Okichi continues to refuse. Yohei mentions that he is a human as well and that his parents' words have sunk deep into his soul and he is miserable. He tells Okichi his situation, saying that he was determined to kill himself should he bring ruin to his family by not being able to repay the debt. Moved, Okichi starts to go for the safe, but then thinks it is another one of Yohei's tricks. She refuses to lend him the money. Yohei, defeated, says that he will not ask again but instead asks that she fill up his cask with three quarts of oil on credit. She agrees, as that is their business. As she measures out the oil, Yohei draws his dagger and looks at it, contemplating. In the other room, Okichi says that he should enjoy the holiday and that his parents will likely take him back provided they can afford him, and asks him for forgiveness for refusing to loan him money. She is then startled by the glint of his blade reflected in the lamp oil. She asks what it is, and Yohei hides the dagger behind her, stating that it is nothing; she asks why he is staring at her with such a terrible expression. She asks him to show his right hand. Yohei moves the dagger to his other hand and then shows his right. Okichi starts to tremble telling him not to come any closer as Yohei starts to follow her. She attempts to escape but cannot get away as Yohei leaps at her. Okichi screams and begs to be spared. Yohei asks her to die quietly. They struggle and a night wind extinguishes the light in the shop as they are enveloped in darkness. In the darkness Yohei slips and spills oil. They slip and slide on the oil and blood, Yohei's face is smeared with blood. Finally he is able to get hold of her and kills her. Covered in oil and blood, he gets the key and unlocks the cupboard, barely able to stand, thunder clapping overhead. He retrieves the 580 me and hastily stuffs it into his kimono. It weighs him down and his steps are heavy. He runs out of the house and away as fast as his legs will carry him.

Most performances of the play end here; however, the script goes on.

Sometime after the festival, Yohei's uncle Moriemon goes looking for him, who is back with Kogiku. No one knows for certain that it was Yohei who killed Okichi and stole the money. Before his uncle arrives, however, Yohei flees, stating he left his wallet somewhere else. His uncle talks to the shop and then leaves as well. At Shichizae-mon's house on the 35th night after the murder of Okichi, Shichizae-mon is mourning her when Yohei arrives, who has been making frequent condolence calls in order to kill suspicion that he committed the murder. However, Shichizae-mon has found proof and subdues Yohei. Moriemon arrives with guards and Tahei and tells of the widespread rumors that Yohei is the murderer. Moriemon and Tahei weep to have such a nephew and brother. Yohei speaks his last monologue, stating that previously he had never stolen so much as a copper, though he was often late in paying his debts. He recounts what drove him to madness, due to not wanting to ruin his father with undue debt, and confesses to the crime. The men seize and bind him. They drag him to his final destination where he will be executed.

== Adaptations ==
- The Oil-Hell Murder is a 1992 Japanese film directed by Hideo Gosha. It was Japan's submission to the 65th Academy Awards for the Academy Award for Best Foreign Language Film, but was not accepted as a nominee.
