= Sachiko Hidari =

Japanese actress and director (1930–2001)

Sachiko Hidari 左幸子
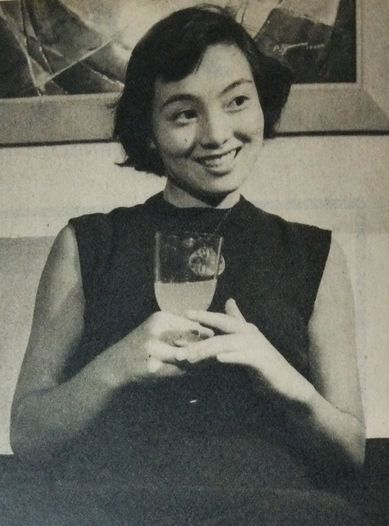
- Sachiko Hidari in 1952
- Born: Sachiko Nukamura; 29 June 1930; Asahi, Toyama, Japan
- Died: 7 November 2001 (aged 71); Tokyo, Japan
- Occupations: Actress, director
- Years active: 1952–1995
- Spouse: Susumu Hani (m. 1959; div. 1977)

Sachiko Hidari (左幸子, Hidari Sachiko; 29 June 1930 – 7 November 2001) was a Japanese actress and film director.

== Life ==
Hidari was born Sachiko Nukamura (額村幸子) in Asahi, Toyama, as the eldest of 8 children. She graduated from Tokyo Women's College of Physical Education and gave her film debut in 1952 in Wakaki hi no ayamachi. Between 1952 and 1995, she appeared in more than 90 films under the direction of filmmakers such as Tadashi Imai, Shōhei Imamura and Paul Schrader. In 1964, she won the Silver Bear for Best Actress at the 14th Berlin International Film Festival for her roles in She and He and The Insect Woman. In 1977, she directed and starred in the film The Far Road, which made her the first woman actor–director since Kinuyo Tanaka, and was entered into the 28th Berlin International Film Festival. Hidari also appeared on stage and television. She died of lung cancer in 2001.

Hidari was married to director Susumu Hani from 1959 to 1977, with whom she had one daughter, Mio Hani. Her sister is actress Tokie Hidari.

== Selected filmography ==
- An Inn at Osaka (1954)
- The Maid's Kid (1955)
- The Balloon (1956)
- Mahiru no ankoku (1956)
- Sun in the Last Days of the Shogunate (1957)
- Warm Current (1957)
- The Boy Who Came Back (1958)
- Ballad of the Cart (1959)
- A Woman's Testament (1960)
- The Demon of Mount Oe (1960)
- The Insect Woman (1963)
- She and He (1963)
- A Fugitive from the Past (1965)
- The Wild Sea (1969)
- Faire l'amour : De la pilule à l'ordinateur (1971, also co-dir., anthology film)
- Under the Flag of the Rising Sun (1972)
- Barefoot Gen (1976)
- The Far Road (1977, also dir.)
- The Love Suicides at Sonezaki (1978)
- Mishima: A Life in Four Chapters (1985)

== Awards ==
- 1955: Mainichi Film Award for Best Supporting Actress for Ofukuro and Jinsei tombo gaeri
- 1963: Blue Ribbon Award for Best Actress and Mainichi Film Award for Best Actress for The Insect Woman and She and He
- 1964: Silver Bear for Best Actress and Kinema Junpo Award for Best Actress for The Insect Woman and She and He
- 1965: Mainichi Film Award for Best Actress for A Fugitive from the Past
- 1967: Mainichi Film Award for Best Supporting Actress for Onna no issho and Harubiyori
- 2001: Mainichi Film Special Award for her lifetime achievement
