= Keiho =

- Film poster
- Directed by: Yoshimitsu Morita
- Written by: Sumio Ōmori
- Produced by: Hikaru Suzuki; Hajime Yuki; Kazuko Misawa; Tsutomu Yamamoto; Renji Tazawa
- Starring: Kyōka Suzuki; Shinichi Tsutsumi; Ittoku Kishibe; Naoki Sugiura; Kirin Kiki
- Cinematography: Hiroshi Takase
- Edited by: Shinji Tanaka
- Music by: Toshihiko Sahashi
- Production companies: Kouwa International; Shochiku
- Distributed by: Shochiku
- Release date: February 17, 1999 (Japan)
- Running time: 133 minutes
- Country: Japan
- Language: Japanese

Keiho (Japanese: 39 刑法第三十九条, Hepburn: 39 keihō dai sanjūkyū jō) (Note: The film's Japanese title refers to Article 39 of the Japanese Penal Code.) is a 1999 Japanese courtroom drama psychological thriller film directed by Yoshimitsu Morita. It stars Shinichi Tsutsumi as an actor standing trial for a gruesome double murder. The film also stars Kyōka Suzuki, Ittoku Kishibe and Naoki Sugiura. Shochiku released Keiho on February 17, 1999, in Japan. The film was nominated for and won several major awards.

== Premise ==
Young actor Masaki Shibata confesses to the murder of a pregnant woman and her husband. Shibata acts strangely in the aftermath, making a point of asking for the death penalty and ranting about angels and demons. The subsequent psychiatric evaluation reveals evidence of a split personality and concludes that Shibata may be unfit for trial. However, the assistant psychologist is convinced he’s faking the symptoms. A lead detective on the case also suspects that there is more to the situation than meets the eye.

== Cast ==
- Kyōka Suzuki – Kafuka Ogawa
- Shinichi Tsutsumi – Masaki Shibata
  - Tomonori Yoshida – Masaki Shibata (as a child)
- Ittoku Kishibe – Inspector Nagoshi
- Naoki Sugiura – Professor Saneyuki Fujishiro
- Kirin Kiki – Defence Counsel Shigure Nagamura
- Tōru Emori – Prosecutor Michihiko Kusama
- Hideko Yoshida – Kafuka's Mother
- Mirai Yamamoto – Mikako Kudo
  - Mika Asai – Mikako Kudo (as a child)
- Masanobu Katsumura – Sunaoka
- Jun Kunimura – Shibata Toshimitsu
- Yasuhito Ohchi – Keisuke Kudo (as a child)
- Takashi Sasano – Tezuka
- Takatoshi Takeda – Detective Nakamura
- Masato Irie – Hatata Osamu
  - Isamu Minami – Hatata Osamu (as a child)
- Misayo Haruki – Hatata Kei
- Daikichi Sugawara – Detective Tatebayashi
- Ayako Yoshitani – Atsuko Kudo
- Kazuyo Kawamura – Miyuki Kudo
- Koji Sato – Iwaki Senjo
- Hiroshi Isobe – Inuyama's Lawyer
- Lucky Ikeda – Inuyama's Detective
- Kumiko Tsuchiya – Nogami Yoriko
- Tadao Tamura – Presiding Judge
- Hirokazu Inoue – Muramatsu
- Chosuke Ikariya – Patient
- Toshie Kobayashi – Asylum Nurse
- Ichiro Ohba
- Yasushi Higuchi

== Release ==
Keiho was theatrically released by Shochiku on February 17, 1999, in Japan. It was later released on VHS on April 21, 2000, and DVD on August 25, 2002 by Bandai Visual.

== Awards and nominations ==
42nd Blue Ribbon Awards

- Won: Best Actress - Kyōka Suzuki

49th Berlin International Film Festival

- Nominated: Golden Bear

21st Yokohama Film Festival

- Won: Best Film
- Won: Best Director - Yoshimitsu Morita
- Won: Best Screenplay - Sumio Ōmori

73rd Kinema Junpo Best Ten Awards

- Best Ten List: 3rd place
- Readers' Choice Top 10 Japanese Films of the Year: 5th place
- Won: Best Actress – Kyōka Suzuki

54th Mainichi Film Awards

- Won: Excellence Film (shared with Kikujiro, Spellbound and M/Other)
- Won: Best Director – Yoshimitsu Morita

23rd Japan Academy Awards

- Nominated: Best Screenplay – Sumio Ōmori
- Nominated: Best Actress – Kyōka Suzuki
- Nominated: Best Sound Recording – Fumio Hashimoto
