= Like a Rolling Stone (film) =

1994 Japanese film by Tatsumi Kumashiro

- DVD cover

Japanese name
- Kanji: 棒の哀しみ
Transcriptions
- Revised Hepburn: Bo no Kanashimi
- Directed by: Tatsumi Kumashiro
- Screenplay by: Tatsumi Kumashiro; Hidehiro Ito
- Produced by: Hidehiro Ito; Yasuhide Kidota; Kinya Yagi; Misa Ohkatsu
- Starring: Eiji Okuda; Eiko Nagashima; Reiko Takashima; Show Aikawa; Hakuryu
- Cinematography: Junichiro Hayashi
- Edited by: Masaru Iizuka
- Music by: Tatsunori Oda
- Production companies: Hero Films; Excellent Film
- Release date: October 1, 1994 (Japan)
- Running time: 123 minutes
- Country: Japan
- Language: Japanese

Like a Rolling Stone (Japanese: 棒の哀しみ, Hepburn: Bo no Kanashimi) is a 1994 Japanese film directed by Tatsumi Kumashiro.

== Cast ==
- Eiji Okuda
- Eiko Nagashima
- Reiko Takashima
- Show Aikawa
- Hakuryu
- Misayo Haruki
- Sei Hiraizumi
- Yūsuke Koike
- Ryo Amamiya
- Naoto Takenaka
- Kaori Momoi
- Satoshi Shinohara
- Hitoshi Kato
- Tatsuya Negishi
- Hiromi Nakajima

== Awards and nominations ==
37th Blue Ribbon Awards

- Won: Best Film
- Won: Best Director – Tatsumi Kumashiro
- Won: Best Actor – Eiji Okuda

19th Hochi Film Award

- Won: Best Director – Tatsumi Kumashiro

49th Mainichi Film Awards

- Won: Excellence Film (shared with Ghost Pub, 119, Crest of Betrayal and Natsu no Niwa Friend)
