= Eiko Nagashima =

Japanese actress

- Occupation: Actress

Eiko Nagashima (永島暎子, Nagashima Eiko) is a Japanese actress. She won the award for best actress at the 5th Yokohama Film Festival and the award for best supporting actress at the 8th Hochi Film Award for Ryuji.

== Selected filmography ==
=== Film ===
- Crazy Fruit (1981)
- Ryuji (1983)
- Seburi Monogatari (1985)
- Like a Rolling Stone (1994)
- Beneath the Shadow (2020)

=== Television ===
- Hanekonma (1986)
