= Village of Dreams =

- DVD cover
- Directed by: Yōichi Higashi
- Screenplay by: Takehiro Nakajima; Yōichi Higashi
- Based on: The Village of My Paintings by Seizo Tashima
- Produced by: Koshiro Sho; Tetsujiro Yamagami
- Starring: Mieko Harada; Keigo Matsuyama; Shogo Matsuyama; Kyozo Nagatsuka
- Cinematography: Yoshio Shimizu
- Music by: Katerina Ancient Music Ensemble
- Production companies: SIGLO, Ltd.
- Distributed by: SIGLO, Ltd.
- Release date: July 13, 1996 (Japan)
- Running time: 112 minutes
- Country: Japan
- Language: Japanese

Village of Dreams (Japanese: 絵の中のぼくの村, Hepburn: E no naka no boku no mura) is a 1996 Japanese drama film directed by Yōichi Higashi. It is the story of twin brothers growing up in post-war rural Japan, based on an autobiographical novel by Seizo Tashima. The film won the Silver Bear for an outstanding single achievement at the 46th Berlin International Film Festival.

== Premise ==
An autobiographical story depicting the childhood of twin picture book authors, Seizo Tajima and Yukihiko Tajima. The twins appear as themselves in a prologue, after which the film flashes back to their youth in the rural outskirts of Kyoto shortly after the end of World War II.

At 9 years of age, Seizo and Yukihiko lead a normal existence: they go to school, play pranks and enjoy afternoons fishing and capturing small animals. However, they also have active imaginations. They envision witches in trees, imps hiding in undergrowth and talking fish. The film explores the juxtaposition of these magical realist elements and the simplicity of their surroundings, as well as their relationships with their mother (a teacher), their father (a civil servant), their landlord and the new kid at school.

== Cast ==
- Mieko Harada as Mizue Tashima (mother)
- Keigo Matsuyama as Seizo Tashima
- Shogo Matsuyama as Yukihiko Tashima
- Kyozo Nagatsuka as Kenzo Tashima (father)
- Mizuki Mamada as Ikuko Tajima
- Kaneko Iwasaki as Toshie
- Hosei Komatsu as Grandfather
- Tokuko Sugiyama as Grandmother
- Koichi Ueda as Iwata, Principal
- Mika Yamauchi as Satsumi
- Kentaro Tamiya as Senji
- Takehiro Nakajima as Ward Mayor
- Seizo Tajima as himself
- Yukihiko Tajima as himself
- Eiko Tajima as herself

== Awards and nominations ==
46th Berlin International Film Festival

- Won: Silver Bear for Outstanding Single Achievement

12th Film Fest Gent

- Won: Grand Prix for Best Film

47th Minister of Education's Art Encouragement Prize

- Won

51st Mainichi Film Awards

- Won: Excellence Film (shared with Gakko II, Kids Return and Sleeping Man)

21st Hochi Film Awards

- Won: Best Actress (Mieko Harada)

39th Blue Ribbon Awards

- Won: Best Actress (Mieko Harada)

70th Kinema Junpo Best Ten Awards

- Best Ten List: 5th place
- Readers' Choice Top 10 Japanese Films of the Year: 9th place
- Won: Best Actress (Mieko Harada)
