= Tora-san's Dear Old Home =

- Theatrical poster
- Directed by: Yoji Yamada
- Written by: Yoji Yamada; Yoshitaka Asama
- Starring: Kiyoshi Atsumi; Sayuri Yoshinaga
- Cinematography: Tetsuo Takaba
- Edited by: Iwao Ishii
- Music by: Naozumi Yamamoto
- Distributed by: Shochiku
- Release date: August 5, 1972
- Running time: 108 minutes
- Country: Japan
- Language: Japanese

Tora-san's Dear Old Home (男はつらいよ 柴又慕情, Otoko wa Tsurai yo: Shibamata Bojō) aka Tora-san's New Romance is a 1972 Japanese comedy film directed by Yoji Yamada. It stars Kiyoshi Atsumi as Torajirō Kuruma (Tora-san), and Sayuri Yoshinaga as his love interest or "Madonna". Tora-san's Dear Old Home is the ninth entry in the popular, long-running Otoko wa Tsurai yo series, and the first to employ an opening dream-sequence, which became a standard feature of the series. It is also the first film in the series in which Tatsuo Matsumura plays Tora-san's uncle, a role he took over from Shin Morikawa who died after the eighth film.

== Synopsis ==
Tora-san meets three women on vacation when he travels to Fukui. One of the women meets him at his home, and he believes she has fallen in love with him, unaware that she hopes to marry a potter in the countryside.

== Cast ==
- Kiyoshi Atsumi as Torajiro
- Chieko Baisho as Sakura
- Sayuri Yoshinaga as Utako
- Tatsuo Matsumura as Kuruma Tatsuzō
- Chieko Misaki as Tsune Kuruma (Torajiro's aunt)
- Gin Maeda as Hiroshi Suwa
- Hayato Nakamura as Mitsuo Suwa
- Hisao Dazai as Tarō Ume
- Gajirō Satō as Genkō
- Chishū Ryū as Gozen-sama
- Masaaki Tsusaka as Noboru

== Critical appraisal ==
Stuart Galbraith IV writes that Tora-san's Dear Old Home is a "typically fine early entry in the series' run", which shows Yamada and Atsumi still experimenting with the Tora-san character and stories. Galbraith singles out Yamada's portrayal of "fleeting friendships" in this film, pointing out, "Yamada's camera lingers on little details, especially the sadness of departing trains and the pain of saying goodbye." He points out that the film is also very funny, with Chishū Ryū performing an especially humorous scene as the Buddhist priest. The German-language site molodezhnaja gives Tora-san's Dear Old Home four out of five stars.

== Availability ==
Tora-san's Dear Old Home was released theatrically on August 5, 1972. In Japan, the film was released on videotape in 1995, and in DVD format in 2008.

== Bibliography ==
=== English ===
- "OTOKO WA TSURAI YO SHIBAMATA BOJO (1972)". British Film Institute. Archived from the original on 2011-08-09.
- "OTOKO WA TSURAIYO -SHIBAMATA BOJO". Complete Index to World Film.
- Otoko wa tsurai yo: Shibamata bojo (1972) at IMDb
- Galbraith IV, Stuart (2005-01-09). "Tora-san 09: Tora-san's Dear Old Home (Region 3)". DVD Talk.

=== German ===
- "Tora-San's Dear Old Home" (in German). www.molodezhnaja.ch.

=== Japanese ===
- 男はつらいよ 柴又慕情(1972) (in Japanese). allcinema.net.
- "男はつらいよ 柴又慕情". Japanese Cinema Database (Agency for Cultural Affairs). Archived from the original on 2012-02-26.
- 男はつらいよ 柴又慕情 (in Japanese). Japanese Movie Database.
- 男はつらいよ 柴又慕情 (in Japanese). Kinema Junpo. Archived from the original on 2012-03-09.
