= Miwako Okamura =

Japanese actress

- Born: 藤谷 美和子 (Fujitani Miwako); March 10, 1963 (age 63); Toshima, Tokyo, Japan
- Occupations: Actress, singer
- Spouse: Shunichi Okamura (2005–present)

Miwako Okamura (岡村 美和子, Okamura Miwako; born March 10, 1963, in Tokyo) is a Japanese actress. She was married to Shunichi Okamura in December 2005. She won the award for Best Supporting Actress at the 17th Hochi Film Awards for The Oil-Hell Murder and Netorare Sosuke in 1992. In 1994, Okamura, then known under her maiden name Miwako Fujitani, released her first single containing the duet song "Ai ga Umareta Hi" (愛が生まれた日; "The Day Love Was Born"), an insert song from the TV drama Sonouchi Kekkon Suru Kimi e (そのうち結婚する君へ) starring herself that she sang with Yoshiaki Ohuchi (大内義昭). The single sold over 2 million copies.

== Filmography ==
- To Trap a Kidnapper (1982)
- The Miracle of Joe Petrel (1984)
- Sorekara (1985)
- Michi (1986)
- The Oil-Hell Murder (1992)
- Sosuke Loses His Lover (1992)
