= Where Spring Comes Late =

- Theatrical release poster
- Directed by: Yoji Yamada
- Screenplay by: Yoji Yamada; Akira Miyazaki
- Starring: Chieko Baisho; Hisashi Igawa; Chishū Ryū
- Production company: Shochiku
- Release date: October 24, 1970
- Running time: 106 minutes
- Country: Japan
- Language: Japanese

Where Spring Comes Late (Japanese: 家族, Hepburn: Kazoku), also known as The Family, is a 1970 Japanese film directed by Yoji Yamada.

== Plot ==
The Kazami family live on the island of Iōjima, Nagasaki, where Seiichi Kamazi works in a coal mine. With the coal mine closing, Seiichi decides to move to Hokkaido and become a dairy farmer. The family rides the train between the two islands (a roughly 3,000-mile journey). Along the way, they stop in Fukuyama, where Seiichi's brother Tsutomu lives, Osaka, where they attend Expo '70, and Tokyo. In Tokyo, the family's youngest daughter passes away. Genzō, Seiichi's father, reaches Hokkaido but passes away shortly after. He is buried in a Catholic ceremony. Despite Seiichi's misgivings, Tamiko (his wife) convinces him to stay and forge a new life for themselves.

== Cast ==
- Chieko Baisho as Tamiko Kazami
- Hisashi Igawa as Seiichi Kazami
- Chishū Ryū as Genzō Kazami
- Gin Maeda
- Hiroshi Inuzuka as Comedian
- Kiyoshi Atsumi
- Shūichi Ikeda

== Awards ==
25th Mainichi Film Award

- Won: Best Film

== Criticism ==
Scholar Yoshikuni Igarashi called the film "a declaration of war against the regime of the high-growth economy." He views Seiichi's journey as motivated by his desire to maintain economic independence.
