= The Oil-Hell Murder =

- Film poster
- Directed by: Hideo Gosha
- Screenplay by: Masato Ide
- Based on: The Woman-Killer and the Hell of Oil by Chikamatsu Monzaemon
- Produced by: Kazuyoshi Okuyama; Tomoki Ikeda; Yoshihisa Nakagawa
- Starring: Kanako Higuchi; Miwako Fujitani; Shinichi Tsutsumi
- Cinematography: Fujio Morita
- Edited by: Isamu Ichida
- Music by: Masaru Sato
- Production company: Fuji Television
- Distributed by: Shochiku
- Release date: 23 May 1992 (Japan)
- Running time: 115 minutes
- Country: Japan
- Language: Japanese

The Oil-Hell Murder (Japanese: 女殺油地獄, Hepburn: Onna goroshi abura no jigoku) is a 1992 Japanese drama film directed by Hideo Gosha. It was Gosha's final film, released three months prior to his death in August 1992. The film was Japan's submission to the 65th Academy Awards for the Academy Award for Best Foreign Language Film, but was not accepted as a nominee.

The story of murder, lust, custom and violence centers around oil sellers in 18th century Osaka. It is based on the bunraku and kabuki play The Woman-Killer and the Hell of Oil (Note: The names of the works are the same in Japanese and only differ in English.) by Chikamatsu Monzaemon. The Oil-Hell Murder was released by the Criterion Collection in summer 2013 on their Hulu channel.

== Cast ==
- Kanako Higuchi as Okichi
- Miwako Fujitani as Kogiku
- Shinichi Tsutsumi as Yohei
- Hiroyuki Nagato
- Renji Ishibashi
- Takurō Tatsumi
- Sumie Sasaki

== See also ==
- Cinema of Japan
- List of submissions to the 65th Academy Awards for Best Foreign Language Film
- List of Japanese submissions for the Academy Award for Best Foreign Language Film
- Yoshinobu Nishioka
