= Caterpillar (2010 film) =

2010 film

- Film poster
- Directed by: Kōji Wakamatsu
- Written by: Hisako Kurosawa; Masao Adachi
- Produced by: Takafumi Ohigata
- Starring: Shinobu Terajima
- Cinematography: Yoshihisa Toda; Tomohiko Tsuji
- Edited by: Shuichi Kakesu
- Release dates: 15 February 2010 (Berlinale); 14 August 2010 (Japan)
- Running time: 85 minutes
- Country: Japan
- Language: Japanese
- Box office: $251,922

Caterpillar (Japanese: キャタピラー, Hepburn: Kyatapirā) is a 2010 Japanese drama film directed by Kōji Wakamatsu, partially drawn from Edogawa Ranpo's banned short-story "The Caterpillar" (芋虫, Imomushi; 1929).

The film is a critique of the right-wing militarist nationalism that guided Japan's conduct in Asia during the Second Sino-Japanese War and World War II. The film deals with various issues, such as war crimes, handicapped veterans, and spousal abuse. The film also deals with themes of sexual perversion and features graphic sex scenes.

It was nominated for the Golden Bear at the 60th Berlin International Film Festival. Shinobu Terajima received the Silver Bear for Best Actress at the Berlin Film Festival for her portrayal of Kurokawa's wife.

== Plot ==
The film is set in the late 1930s, during the Second Sino-Japanese War. In the first scene, Lieutenant Kurokawa scourges, rapes and disembowels Chinese people during the war. Later, he returns home as a war hero, but with a horribly mutilated body. He is alive but reduced to a torso (no limbs), deaf and mute, with burns covering half of his face, but with three medals on his chest. Despite his condition, he is still constantly eager for sex, which he performs acrobatically with his wife. The sexual acts are rough and are imposed on his wife, who is repulsed by him. Nevertheless she feels a duty to take care of him. The film concludes with the disabled veteran Kurokawa committing suicide by dragging himself into a pond outside his home.

== Cast ==
- Shinobu Terajima as Shigeko Kurokawa
- Keigo Kasuya as Tadashi Kurokawa
- Sabu Kawahara as The Village Chief
- Go Jibiki as Military officer #1
- Arata as Military officer #2
- Katsuyuki Shinohara as Kuma
- Daisuke Iijima as Commander
- Ichirō Ogura as Announcer
- Sanshirō Kobayashi as Village man #1
- Mariko Terada as Chinese woman #2
- Ken Furusawa

== Themes ==
Wakamatsu's film is part of a revisionist movement seen in fashion, cartoons and video games that reconsider the country's past. The film is the political response to and criticism of Yukio Mishima's short film Patriotism. Caterpillar criticizes Japanese militarism, satirically deploys Japanese propaganda, and significantly politicizes and humanizes Edogawa Rampo's 1929 banned short-story. The film demystifies the glorification of war, which is used to hide war's grim reality. It also depicts the unfair demands placed on Japanese women, during war and peacetime.

The film represents a departure from Japanese films of the immediate post-war year, which often emphasized a notion of Japanese victimhood with little or no acknowledgement of wartime atrocities. There are frequent references in the film to the mass rape and murder of Chinese civilians during the Second Sino-Japanese War. There is no sense that Japan was the primary victim of World War II, as may be seen in other Japanese films on the war. The film is both anti-nationalist and anti-war in its depiction of the Empire of Japan.

== Reception ==
The film received a 91% rating on film review aggregator Rotten Tomatoes. It grossed $4,157 at the domestic box office and $247,765 at the foreign box office for a combined Worldwide total of $251,922.

== Awards ==
It was nominated for the Golden Bear at the 60th Berlin International Film Festival. Shinobu Terajima received the Silver Bear for Best Actress at the Berlin Film Festival for her portrayal of Kurokawa's wife.
