= Sayuri Yoshinaga =

Japanese actress

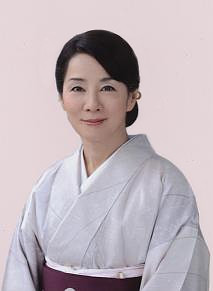
- Yoshinaga in 2010
- Born: Shibuya, Tokyo, Japan
- Occupation: Actress
- Years active: 1957–present

Sayuri Yoshinaga (吉永 小百合, Yoshinaga Sayuri) is a Japanese actress and activist. She has won four Japan Academy Best Actress awards, more than any other actress, and has been called "one of the foremost stars in the postwar world of film."

== Career ==
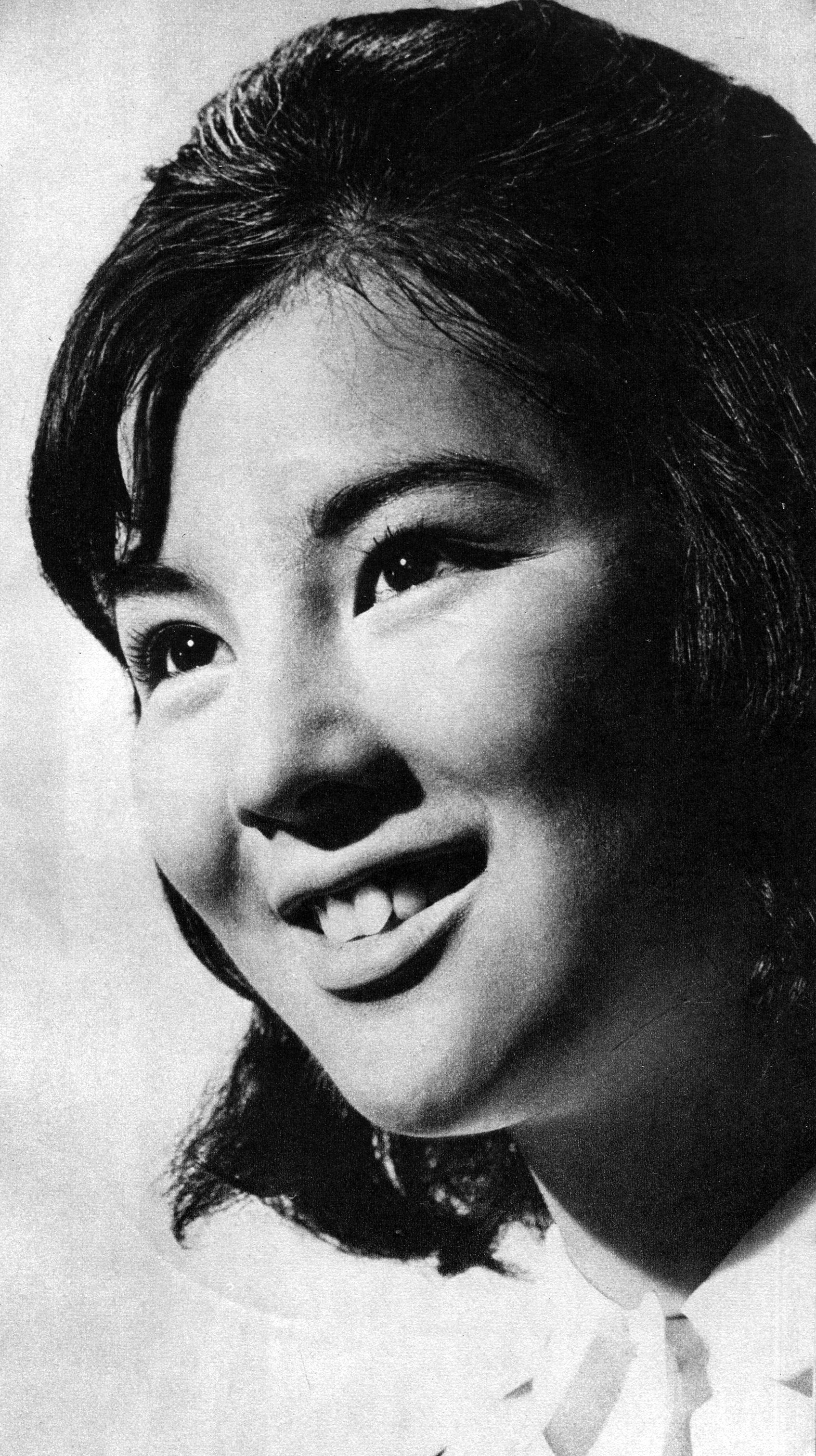
Sayuri Yoshinaga in 1962

Her first media appearance was in the radio drama "Akado Suzunosuke" in 1957, and she has been one of the most popular actresses in Japan since the 1960s, with fans called "Sayur-ists" (Sayurisuto) - for example, Akiyuki Nosaka and Tamori.

She made a contract with the movie corporation Nikkatsu and played the lead role in many of its films. In 1962, Yoshinaga played a junior-high school girl in her most famous film, Foundry Town, and got the Japan Record Award for "Itsudemo Yume wo" (Always Keep the Dream) with the male singer Yukio Hashi. In the 1970s and 1980s, Yoshinaga appeared in films made by other companies, as well as in TV drama serials, commercials, and talk shows. After this period, she returned to films and she has featured in commercials for some big companies such as Sharp Aquos, Nissey and Kagome. She has been awarded the Japan Academy Prize four times. Yoshinaga has appeared in 125 films, mostly in the leading role. Yoshinaga starred in Kon Ichikawa's Ohan and The Makioka Sisters. She also starred in Yoji Yamada's Kabei: Our Mother and About Her Brother.

In 2012, she starred in Junji Sakamoto's A Chorus of Angels.

== Character ==
Yoshinaga graduated from Waseda University, the Schools of Letters, Arts and Sciences II in 1969. Under a tight schedule, she took the runners-up value in the school among the graduates in that year. In 1973, she married Taro Okada, a TV director worked in Fuji Television, keeping her maiden name "Yoshinaga" as her stage name. She has no children.

From the 1980s, after playing Yumechiyo in TV drama, a hibakusha geisha by Atomic bombings of Hiroshima, she has worked for the anti-nuclear movement. Her most well-known action is reading the poems about atomic bombs over 20 years, and she worked without guarantees for voice guidance in the Hiroshima Peace Memorial Museum. She is also famous for supporting a Nippon Professional Baseball (NPB) club, Seibu Lions. Yoshiaki Tsutsumi, the former owner of this team is a fan of Yoshinaga, and she bought a pension from Tsutsumi's Seibu Railway group.

== Selected filmography ==
=== Film ===
| Year | Title | Role | Notes | Ref. |
|---|---|---|---|---|
| 1960 | Kenju burai-chō Denkō Setsuka no Otoko | Dan Noriko | | |
| 1960 | Mutekiga Ore o Yondeiru | Hamazaki Yukiko | | |
| 1962 | Foundry Town | Jun | Lead role | |
| 1963 | Izu no Odoriko | Kaoru | Lead role | |
| 1966 | The Hearth of Hiroshima | | Lead role | |
| 1968 | Monument to the Girls' Corps | | Lead role | |
| 1971 | Men and War Part II | Yoriko Godai | | |
| 1972 | Tora-san's Dear Old Home | Utako | | |
| 1973 | Men and War Part III | Yoriko Godai | | |
| 1974 | Tora-san's Lovesick | Utako | | |
| 1975 | The Gate of Youth | Tae Ibuki | | |
| 1978 | August Without the Emperor | | | |
| 1980 | Dōran | | | |
| 1983 | The Makioka Sisters | Yukiko Makioka | | |
| 1984 | Station to Heaven | | Lead role | |
| 1984 | Ohan | Ohan | Lead role | |
| 1985 | Yumechiyo | Yumechiyo | Lead role | |
| 1987 | Film Actress | Kon Ichikawa | Lead role | |
| 1988 | A Chaos of Flowers | Akiko Yosano | Lead role | |
| 1992 | Gekashitsu | | Lead role | |
| 1993 | Yearning | | Lead role | |
| 1998 | Diary of Early Winter Shower | | Lead role | |
| 2000 | Nagasaki burabura bushi | | Lead role | |
| 2001 | Sennen no Koi Story of Genji | Murasaki Shikibu | Lead role | |
| 2005 | Year One in the North | | Lead role | |
| 2008 | Kabei: Our Mother | | Lead role | |
| 2010 | About Her Brother | | Lead role | |
| 2012 | A Chorus of Angels | | Lead role | |
| 2014 | Cape Nostalgia | | Lead role | |
| 2015 | Nagasaki: Memories of My Son | Nobuko Fukuhara | Lead role | |
| 2018 | Sakura Guardian in the North | Tetsu Ezure | Lead role | |
| 2019 | The Bucket List | Sashie Kitahara | Lead role | |
| 2021 | A Morning of Farewell | Sawako Shiraishi | Lead role | |
| 2023 | Mom, Is That You?! | Fukue | Lead role | |
| 2025 | Climbing for Life | Junko Tabe | Lead role | |
| 2027 | Haha no Matsu Sato | Chiyo Koga | Lead role | |

=== Television ===
| Year | Title | Role | Notes | Ref. |
|---|---|---|---|---|
| 1970 | Momi no Ki wa Nokotta | Uno | Taiga drama | |
| 1976 | Kaze to Kumo to Niji to | Takako | Taiga drama | |
| 1981–84 | The Diary of Yumechiyo | Yumechiyo | Lead role; 3 seasons | |

== Awards ==
- 1961: Elan d'or Award for Newcomer of the Year
- 1962: Japan Record Award
- 1984: 9th Hochi Film Award - Best Actress for Ohan and Station to Heaven
- 1985: Japan Academy Prize - Outstanding Performance by an Actress in a Leading Role
- 1986: Kinuyo Tanaka Award
- 1989: Japan Academy Prize - Outstanding Performance by an Actress in a Leading Role
- 1997: Japan Record Award for Concept
- 2001: Japan Academy Prize - Outstanding Performance by an Actress in a Leading Role
- 2006: Japan Academy Prize - Outstanding Performance by an Actress in a Leading Role
- 2006: Medals of Honour with Purple Ribbon
- 2010: Person of Cultural Merit
- 2015: Kikuchi Kan Prize
- 2025: Lifetime Achievement Award at 38th Tokyo International Film Festival
