= Kimurake no Hitobito =

- Theatrical release poster
- Directed by: Yōjirō Takita
- Written by: Nobuyuki Isshiki
- Starring: Takeshi Kaga; Kaori Momoi
- Cinematography: Yōichi Shiga
- Edited by: Isao Tomita
- Music by: Katsuo Ohno
- Production company: Fuji Television
- Release date: May 14, 1988 (Japan)
- Running time: 113 minutes
- Country: Japan
- Language: Japanese

Kimurake no Hitobito (Japanese: 木村家の人びと) is a 1988 Japanese film directed by Yōjirō Takita. It is also known as The Yen Family in America, as well as Famille Yen in France. The film is a comedy about a family and their obsession for making money, starring Takeshi Kaga and Kaori Momoi.

== Cast ==
- Takeshi Kaga as Hajime Kimura
- Kaori Momoi as Noriko Kimura
- Hiromi Iwasaki as Terumi Kimura
- Mitsunori Isaki as Taro Kimura
- Akira Emoto as Shinichi Amemiya
- Yutaka Ikejima as manager
