= Tomorrow (1988 film) =

- Film poster

Japanese name
- Kanji: TOMORROW 明日
- Kana: トゥモロー あした
- Directed by: Kazuo Kuroki
- Screenplay by: Kazuo Kuroki; Masako Inoue; Juichiro Takeuchi
- Based on: Ashita by Mitsuharu Inoue
- Starring: Kaori Momoi; Kaho Minami; Atsuko Sendo; Arthur Kuroda; Shirō Sano
- Cinematography: Tatsuo Suzuki
- Edited by: Masaru Iizuka
- Music by: Teizo Matsumura
- Production companies: Light Vision; Sawai Production; Soeishinsha Company
- Distributed by: Nippon Herald Films
- Release date: August 13, 1988 (Japan)
- Running time: 105 minutes
- Country: Japan
- Language: Japanese

Tomorrow (Japanese: TOMORROW 明日), also known as Ashita and Tomorrow – ashita, is a 1988 Japanese drama film co-written and directed by Kazuo Kuroki. It is the first film in Kuroki’s "War Requiem" thematic trilogy, followed by A Boy’s Summer in 1945 (2002) and The Face of Jizo (2004).

== Premise ==
Tomorrow follows the lives of the people of Nagasaki on August 8, 1945, the day before the United States dropped an atomic bomb on the city. These include a newlywed couple, a pregnant mother and a boy drafted into the army. It chronicles their struggles, their hopes and their dreams for the future, juxtaposed with the reality of what will transpire the following day.

== Cast ==
- Kaori Momoi as Tsuruko Miura
- Kaho Minami as Yae Miura
- Atsuko Sendo as Akiko Miura
- Arthur Kuroda as Tsuguo Ishihara
- Shirō Sano as Shoji Nakagawa
- Hiroyuki Nagato as Taiichiro Miura
- Haruko Mabuchi as Miura's wife
- Shinichiro Okano as Hiro
- Kunie Tanaka
- Moeko Ezawa as Mine
- Yoshio Harada as Yamaguchi
- Kaori Mizushima as Aya
- Hitomi Morinaga as Haruko
- Hiroko Isayama as Prostitute
- Nabe Osami as Mizumoto
- Irie Wakaba as Manko
- Natsuko Kahara as Midwife
- Michiko Araki as Fujio's mother
- Michiyo Yokoyama as Matchmaker
- Terumi Niki as Kiyo
- Taiji Tonoyama as Shopkeeper
- Daigo Kusano as Medicine seller
- Noboru Mitani
- Nishina Fuki

== Awards and nominations ==
13th Hochi Film Award

- Won: Best Film
