= Ruby Moreno =

Filipino actress

Ruby Moreno 毛麗野ルビー
- Born: September 22, 1965 (age 59); Zamboanga City, Philippines
- Occupation: Actress

Ruby Moreno (Japanese: 毛麗野ルビー, Hepburn: Mōreino Rubī, born September 22, 1965) is a Filipino actress who is based in Japan. She is represented by Inagawa Motoko Office. She appeared in various films and television shows in Japan as well as in a number of Philippine films.

She won several acting awards including the award for best actress at the 18th Hochi Film Award and the award for best supporting actress at the 15th Yokohama Film Festival for All Under the Moon.

== Selected filmography ==
- Swimming with Tears (1992)
- All Under the Moon (1993)
- Shinjuku Outlaw (1994)
- Dead Sure (1996, Tagalog title: Segurista)
- Love Tomato (2006)
- No Place to Go (2022), Maria Ishikawa
