= Tora-san's Rise and Fall =

- Theatrical poster
- Directed by: Yoji Yamada
- Written by: Yoji Yamada; Yoshitaka Asama
- Starring: Kiyoshi Atsumi; Ruriko Asaoka
- Cinematography: Tetsuo Takaba
- Edited by: Iwao Ishii
- Music by: Naozumi Yamamoto
- Distributed by: Shochiku
- Release date: August 2, 1975
- Running time: 90 minutes
- Country: Japan
- Language: Japanese

Tora-san's Rise and Fall (男はつらいよ 寅次郎相合い傘, Otoko wa Tsurai yo: Torajirō Aiaigasa) aka Tora-san Finds a Sweetheart, Tora-san Meets the Songstress Again and Torasan: Love Under the Umbrella is a 1975 Japanese comedy film directed by Yoji Yamada. It stars Kiyoshi Atsumi as Torajirō Kuruma (Tora-san), and Ruriko Asaoka as his love interest or "Madonna". Tora-san's Rise and Fall is the fifteenth entry in the popular, long-running Otoko wa Tsurai yo series.

== Synopsis ==
Tora-san meets an old girlfriend on his travels. When she returns home with him, his family attempts to arrange a marriage between the two. After a misunderstanding occurs, the woman leaves, and the family is left regretting that they interfered.

== Cast ==
- Kiyoshi Atsumi as Torajirō
- Chieko Baisho as Sakura
- Ruriko Asaoka as Lily
- Masami Shimojō as Kuruma Tatsuzō
- Gin Maeda as Hiroshi Suwa
- Chieko Misaki as Tsune Kuruma (Torajiro's aunt)
- Hisao Dazai as Manager
- Gajirō Satō as Genkō
- Hayato Nakamura as Mitsuo Suwa
- Yoshio Yoshida as Slave trader
- Tsunehiko Kamijō as Pirate
- Masakane Yonekura as Pirate

== Critical appraisal ==
At the Blue Ribbon Awards, Ruriko Asaoka was given the Best Actress prize and Chieko Baisho the Best Supporting Actress prize for their roles in Tora-san's Rise and Fall. Asaoka was also named Best Actress at the Kinema Junpo Awards and the Mainichi Film Awards. Mainichi also awarded Kiminobu Satō for Best Art Direction on this film and on Harakara. The German-language site molodezhnaja gives Tora-san's Rise and Fall three and a half out of five stars.

== Availability ==
Tora-san's Rise and Fall was released theatrically on August 2, 1975. In Japan, the film was released on videotape in 1995, and in DVD format in 2005 and 2008.

== Bibliography ==
=== English ===
- "OTOKO WA TSURAI YO TORAJIRO AIAIGASA (1975)". British Film Institute. Archived from the original on 2012-10-17.
- "OTOKO WA TSURAIYO -TORAJIRO AIGASA". Complete Index to World Film.
- Otoko wa tsurai yo: Torajiro aiaigasa (1975) at IMDb

=== German ===
- "Tora-San Meets the Songstress Again" (in German). www.molodezhnaja.ch.

=== Japanese ===
- 男はつらいよ 寅次郎相合い傘 (1975) (in Japanese). allcinema.net.
- "男はつらいよ 寅次郎相合い傘". Japanese Cinema Database (Agency for Cultural Affairs). Archived from the original on 2012-02-26.
- 男はつらいよ 寅次郎相合い傘 (in Japanese). Japanese Movie Database.
- 男はつらいよ 寅次郎相合い傘 (in Japanese). Kinema Junpo. Archived from the original on 2012-03-09.
