= Ohan (film) =

1984 film by Kon Ichikawa

- Theatrical poster
- Directed by: Kon Ichikawa
- Screenplay by: Tomoyuki Tanaka; Kon Ichikawa
- Based on: Ohan by Chiyo Uno
- Produced by: Kazuo Baba; Shōgo Tomiyama
- Starring: Sayuri Yoshinaga
- Cinematography: Yukio Isohata
- Edited by: Chizuko Osada
- Music by: Shinnosuke Okawa
- Distributed by: Toho
- Release date: October 6, 1984 (Japan)
- Running time: 112 minutes
- Country: Japan
- Language: Japanese

Ohan (Japanese: おはん) is a 1984 Japanese drama film directed by Kon Ichikawa. It is based upon the novel of the same name by Chiyo Uno.

== Cast ==
- Sayuri Yoshinaga as Ohan
- Koji Ishizaka as Kokichi
- Reiko Ohara as Okayo
- Michiyo Yamazoe as Osen
- Chōchō Miyako as Obahan
- Fujio Tokita as Fugoro
- Kumeko Otowa as Ofukurosan
- Fumiji Sōda as Heita
- Yuko Miyauchi as Ryōko
- Yukari Uehara as Ochō
- Kimiko Itō as Kiwako
- Michino Yokoyama as Mistress of the Half Moon Retreat
- Takao Zushi as Kataoka
- Jun Hamamura as Head Carpenter
- Yonedanji Katsuro V as Ishiju
- Ayumu Hasegawa as Satoru

== Reception ==
The Los Angeles Times called Ohan "one of the finest films" of Ichikawa's career.

== Awards and nominations ==
9th Hochi Film Award

- Won: Best Actress - Sayuri Yoshinaga
