= All Under the Moon =

- Film poster

Japanese name
- Kana: 月はどっちに出ている
Transcriptions
- Revised Hepburn: Tsuki wa Dotchi ni Dete Iru
- Directed by: Yōichi Sai
- Based on: Taxi Kyōsōkyoku by Yang Sok-il
- Starring: Gorō Kishitani; Ruby Moreno
- Cinematography: Junichi Fujisawa
- Release date: November 6, 1993 (Japan)
- Country: Japan
- Language: Japanese

All Under the Moon (Japanese: 月はどっちに出ている, Hepburn: Tsuki wa Dotchi ni Dete Iru) is a 1993 Japanese film directed by Yoichi Sai and starring Gorō Kishitani and Ruby Moreno.

== Plot ==
Tadao (Goro Kishitani) is a North Korean immigrant who works in a taxi cab company, which is wholly owned by another Korean immigrant whose dream is to build a golf course. Tadao suffers from chronic discrimination because of his Korean ethnicity.

Tadao's mother owns a karaoke bar. Connie (Ruby Moreno) is a Filipina newly hired as a bartender at that bar who can speak fluent Japanese. Tadao pursues the homesick Connie to his mother's dismay.

== Cast ==
- Goro Kishitani - Tadao
- Ruby Moreno - Connie
- Moeko Ezawa - Eijun, Tadao's mother
- Masato Furuoya - Konno
- Yoshiki Arizono - Hoso
- Kenichi Endo
- Masato Hagiwara - Businessman
- Akio Kaneda
- Kumija Kim
- Kim Soo-Jin
- Tatsuya Kimura
- Jun Kunimura - Tada
- Akaji Maro - Senba
- Shigemitsu Ogi
- Wishing Chong - Osamu Ono

== Awards and nominations ==
18th Hochi Film Award

- Won: Best Film
- Won: Best Director - Yōichi Sai
- Won: Best Actress - Ruby Moreno

17th Japan Academy Prize

- Nominated: Best Film
- Nominated: Best Director - Yōichi Sai
- Nominated: Best Screenplay
- Nominated: Best Actress - Ruby Moreno

15th Yokohama Film Festival

- Won: Best Film
- Won: Best Director - Yōichi Sai
- Won: Best Cinematography - Junichi Fujisawa
- Won: Best Supporting Actor - Masato Hagiwara
- Won: Best Supporting Actress - Ruby Moreno
