= Shinobu Terajima =

Japanese actress (born 1972)

- 寺島しのぶ
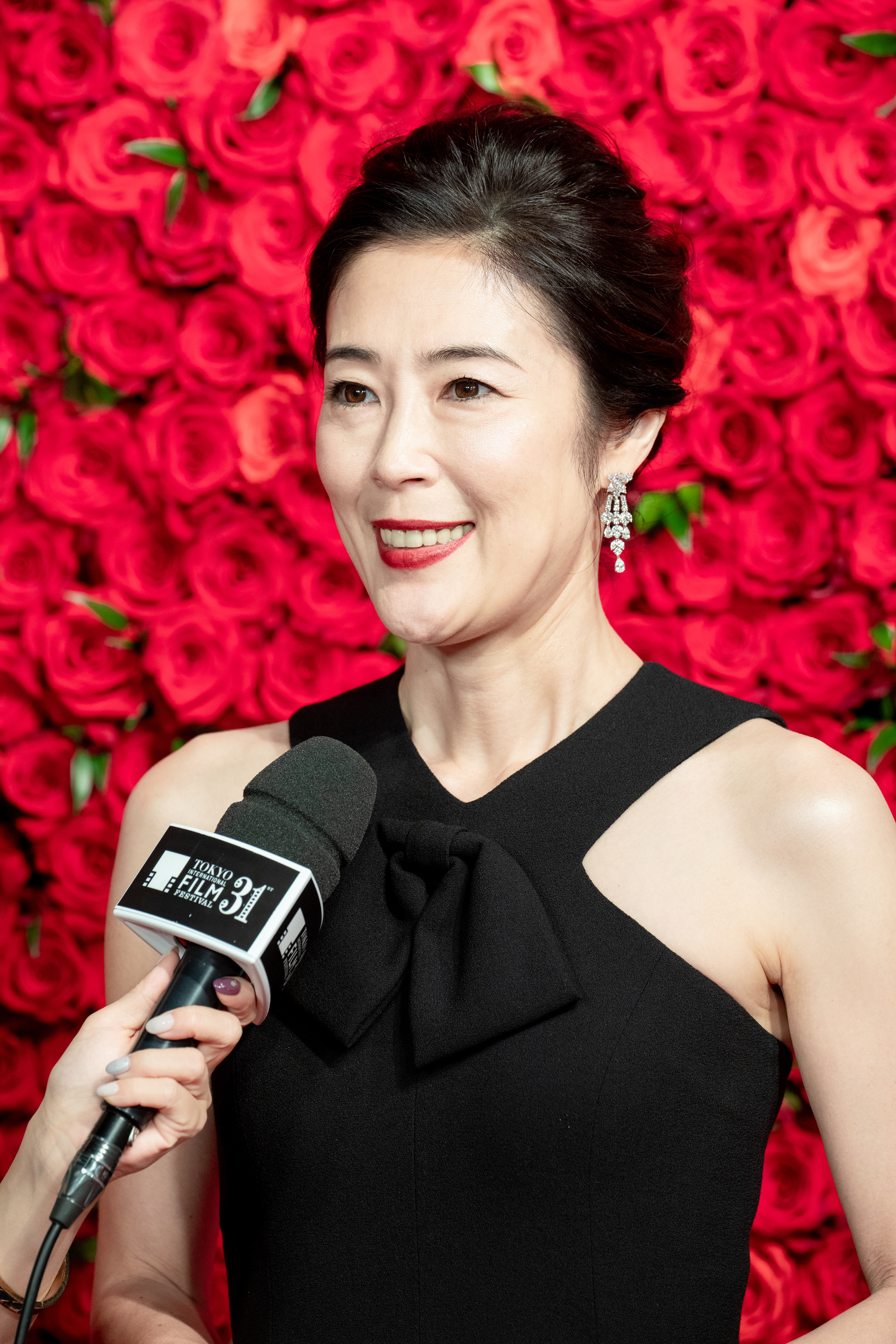
- Terajima at the Tokyo International Film Festival in October 2018
- Born: December 28, 1972 (age 53); Kyoto, Kyoto, Japan
- Occupation: Actress
- Years active: 1995–present
- Spouse: Laurent Ghnassia (m. 2007)
- Children: Onoe Maholo (son)
- Parent(s): Onoe Kikugorō VII (father) (Note: Real Name: Hideyuki Terajima (Japanese: 寺島秀幸, Hepburn: Terajima Hideyuki).); Sumiko Fuji (mother)
- Relatives: Onoe Baikō VII (grandfather) (Note: Real Name: Seizō Terajima (Japanese: 寺島誠三, Hepburn: Terajima Seizō).); Onoe Einosuke II (uncle); Onoe Kikugorō VIII (younger brother) (Note: Real Name: Kazuyasu Terashima (Japanese: 寺嶋和康, Hepburn: Terajima Kazuyasu).); Yoko Namino (sister-in-law) (Note: Daughter of Nakamura Kichiemon II.); Onoe Kikunosuke VI (nephew) (Note: Real Name: Kazufumi Terashima (Japanese: 寺嶋和史, Hepburn: Terajima Kazufumi).)

Shinobu Terajima (寺島 しのぶ, Terajima Shinobu; born December 28, 1972) is a Japanese actress. Her feature films include Akame 48 Waterfalls (2003) and Vibrator (2003). For her role in Caterpillar (2010), Terajima won the Silver Bear for Best Actress at the 60th Berlin Film Festival while her performance in Oh Lucy! (2017) earned her an Independent Spirit Award nomination for Best Actress.

== Early life ==
Her father is the kabuki actor Onoe Kikugorō VII (Japanese: 七代目 尾上菊五郎, Hepburn: Nanadaime Onoe Kikugorō), her mother the actress Sumiko Fuji, and her brother is the kabuki actor Onoe Kikugorō VIII.

She is also the granddaughter of Onoe Baikō VII, a renowned Kabuki actor considered one of the leading onnagata (i.e., a Kabuki actor who plays exclusively female roles) of the Showa era and father of Kikugorō VII (Terajima's father).

== Career ==
As a child, she aspired to be a Kabuki actress like her family, but she was forbidden from pursuing this path because Kabuki was exclusively for men, and her brother Kinosuke was born. In 1992, she joined a theater group thanks to Taichi Kiwako, who was a good friend of her parents. Terajima appeared in Shinobu Yaguchi's Happy Flight.

== Personal life ==
In 2007, she married Laurent Ghnassia, a French art director based in Japan. The couple have one son, born in 2012. In an interview with The Japan Times, Terajima stated that she is raising her son to be a kabuki actor.

== Filmography ==
=== Films ===
- Akame 48 Waterfalls (2003)
- Get Up! (2003)
- Vibrator (2003)
- Quill (2004)
- Riding Alone for Thousands of Miles (2005)
- Tokyo Tower (2005)
- Yamato (2005)
- It's Only Talk (2006)
- Ai no Rukeichi (2006)
- Happy Flight (2008) as Reiko Yamazaki
- Rush Life (2009)
- Caterpillar (2010)
- The Fallen Angel (2010)
- 11:25 The Day He Chose His Own Fate (2012)
- Helter Skelter (2012)
- Sue, Mai & Sawa: Righting the Girl Ship (2012)
- The Millennial Rapture (2012)
- Japan's Tragedy (2013)
- R100 (2013)
- The Shell Collector (2016)
- Star Sand (2016)
- Haha (2017), Seki Kobayashi
- Oh Lucy! (2017)
- Flea-picking Samurai (2018), Omine
- Sakura (2020), Tsubomi Hasegawa
- A Family (2021)
- It's a Flickering Life (2021)
- Arc (2021)
- Intolerance (2021)
- 2 Women (2022), Miharu Osanai
- The Three Sisters of Tenmasou Inn (2022), Keiko Tenma
- My Mom, My Angel: A Journey of Love and Acceptance (2024)
- The Parades (2024), Kaori
- Hakkenden: Fiction and Reality (2024), Ohyaku
- Kokuho (2025), Sachiko Ōgaki
- Hokusai's Daughter (2025), Koto

=== Television ===
- Ryōmaden (2010), Sakamoto Otome
- Here Comes Asa! (2015), Rie Imai
- The Supporting Actors 2 (2018)
- Idaten (2019), Tokuyo Nikaidō
- Poison Daughter, Holy Mother (2019)
- Earwig and the Witch (2020), Bella Yaga (voice)
- The Supporting Actors 3 (2021), Herself
- Modern Love Tokyo (2022)
- What Will You Do, Ieyasu? (2023), narrator/Lady Kasuga

== Honours ==
- Kinuyo Tanaka Award (2023)
