= The Love Suicides at Sonezaki (1978 film) =

- DVD Cover for The Love Suicides at Sonezaki
- Directed by: Yasuzô Masumura
- Written by: Yasuzô Masumura; Yoshio Shirasaka
- Produced by: Hiroaki Fujii; Motoyasu Kimura; Ryuhei Nishimura
- Starring: Ryudo Uzaki; Meiko Kaji
- Cinematography: Setsuo Kobayashi
- Edited by: Tatsuji Nakashizu
- Music by: Ryudo Uzaki
- Release date: 29 April 1978 (Japan)
- Running time: 112 minutes
- Country: Japan
- Language: Japanese

The Love Suicides at Sonezaki (曽根崎心中, Sonezaki Shinjū; also released as Double Suicide Of Sonezaki) is a 1978 Japanese historical romance film directed by Yasuzo Masumura starring Ryudo Uzaki and Meiko Kaji based on the Chikamatsu play of the same name.

== Plot ==
The plot follows closely the original play. Tokubei (Ryudo Uzaki) works as a soy-sauce maker. He falls in love with indentured prostitute O-Hatsu (Meiko Kaji). After O-Hatsu's indenture is bought by a wealthy patron, they plan to commit suicide.

== Cast ==
- Ryudo Uzaki - Tokubei
- Meiko Kaji - O-Hatsu
- Hisashi Igawa - Kyuemon
- Sachiko Hidari - O-Sai
- Isao Hashimoto - Kuheiji
- Gen Kimura - Kichibei

== Production ==
Masumura's treatment of the play is quite literal, and was considered by some (McDonald, 1994) the most faithful screen adaptation of any of Chikamatsu's plays second only to Kurisaki's puppet version two years later. Masumura's casting of Uzaki, a rock star, and Kaji, a young idol, signaled an energetic approach to the story, though the film was restrained by Masumura's standards and did not contain the elements of abnormal behaviour or attack on Japanese society for which Masumura was known. Instead Masumura adopted a theatrical but "sardonic" (Sultanik, 1986) approach with emphasis through concise editing and close-ups.

The crew worked hard to a tight budget, and the lead actress Kaji had been so keen to work with Masumura that she took the role with no guarantee of any payment. The cast and crew finished the filming in 19 days. Kaji recalls that the last 3 days were done with actors and crew working through the nights.

== Critical reception ==
Lead actress Meiko Kaji won several acting awards for her performance, including the Blue Ribbon Award and Hochi Film Award for best actress. The film showed in New York under the English title "The Love Suicides at Sonezaki," and at the Montreal Festival as "Double Suicide Of Sonezaki."
