= Kaori Momoi =

Japanese actress (born 1951)

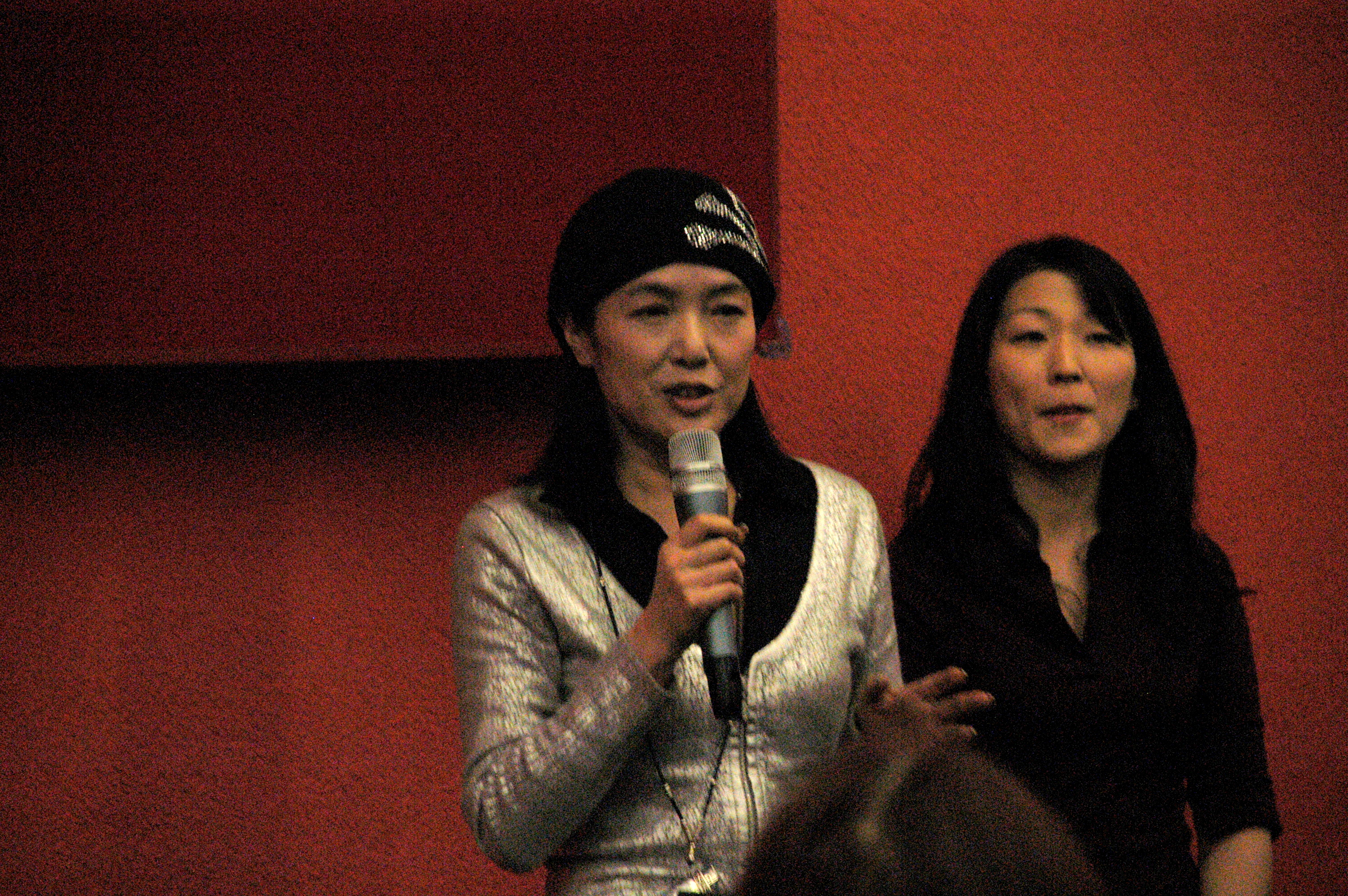
- Kaori Momoi (left)
- Born: 8 April 1951 (age 75); Setagaya, Tokyo, Japan
- Occupation: Actress
- Years active: 1971–present

Kaori Momoi (桃井 かおり, Momoi Kaori; born 8 April 1951) is a Japanese actress.

== Life and career ==
Momoi was born in Tokyo, Japan. At the age of 12, she traveled to London to study dance at the Royal Ballet Academy. After three years, she returned to Tokyo. She graduated from Japan's Bungakuza School of Dramatic Arts. In 1971, Momoi debuted in director Kon Ichikawa's Ai Futatabi (To Love Again).

As an actress, she has worked with directors including Akira Kurosawa (Kagemusha, 1980), Tatsumi Kumashiro (Seishun no Satetsu, 1974), Yoji Yamada (The Yellow Handkerchief, 1977 and Otoko wa Tsuraiyo, 1979), Shohei Imamura (Why Not?, 1981), Shunji Iwai (Swallowtail Butterfly, 1996), Jun Ichikawa (Tokyo Yakyoku, 1997), Mitani Koki (Welcome Back, Mr. McDonald, 1997), Yoshimitsu Morita (Like Asura, 2003) and Takashi Miike (Izo, Sukiyaki Western Django).

She performed in The Sun (2005) directed by Alexander Sokurov and appeared in director Rob Marshall's film Memoirs of a Geisha.

For her film performances in Japan, Momoi has won many awards. She has won the Japanese Academy Awards for Best Actress twice and Best Supporting Actress once and was selected Best Actress at the 1983 New York International Film Festival for her role in Giwaku (Suspicion).

Momoi has pursued various projects in producing, directing, screenwriting, and design in addition to her acting. She has also released 15 albums as a singer and is an essayist.

She won the award for best actress at the 7th Hochi Film Award for Giwaku.

== Filmography ==
=== Film ===
Year	Film	Role	Notes	Ref.
1971	To Love Again	Momoyo		
1974	Ryoma Ansatsu			
1977	The Yellow Handkerchief	Akemi Ogawa		
1979	Tora-san, the Matchmaker	Hitomi		
1979	Kamisama No Kureta Akanbô	Sayoko Morisaki	Japanese: 神様のくれた赤ん坊	
1979	No More Easy Life	Mariko		
1980	Kagemusha	Otsuyanokata		
1980	Yūgure made	Sugiko Emori		
1981	Eijanaika	Ine		
1982	Suspicion	Kumako Onizawa		
1982	The Gate of Youth: Part 2	Kaoru		
1984	Main Theme	Kayoko Ise		
1986	Final Take	Empress Akiko		
1986	Comic Magazine	Herself		
1988	Kimurake no Hitobito	Noriko Kimura		
1988	Tomorrow	Tsuruko		
1990	Ready to Shoot	Ritsuko		
1994	Like a Rolling Stone			
1996	Swallowtail Butterfly	Suzukino		
1997	Welcome Back, Mr. McDonald	Takako Nakaura		
1997	Bounce Ko Gals	Saleswoman		
1998	Daikaijū Tōkyō ni arawaru	Kimie Tadokoro		
2000	Crossfire	Chikako Ishizu		
2003	Like Asura			
2004	Izo			
2005	Memoirs of a Geisha	Mother	American film	
2005	The Sun	Empress Kojun	Russian film	
2006	Love and Honor	Ine Hatano		
2007	Sukiyaki Western Django	Ruriko		
2008	The Yellow Handkerchief	Motel Owner	American film	
2008	Dreaming Awake			
2008	The Ramen Girl	Mamasan (scenes deleted)	American film	
2010	Hong Kong Confidential	Amaya	Latvian film	
2014	Oki - in the middle of the ocean	Oki	American-Latvian film	
2016	Greetings from Fukushima		German film	
2016	Magic Kimono	Keiko	Latvian-Japanese film	
2016	Tales of Mexico		Mexican film	
2017	Ghost in the Shell	Hairi Kusanagi	American Film	
2020	I Never Shot Anyone			
2020	The Brightest Roof in the Universe			

=== Television ===
Year	Title	Role	Network	Notes
1973–76	Taiyō ni Hoero!	Emi Akiyama and Keiko Murai	NTV	Episodes 60 and 199
1975	Hissatsu Hitchū Shigotoya Kagyō	Ohatsu	TV Asahi	Episode 3; Hissatsu series
1975–76	Tsūkai! Kōchiyama Sōshun	Ochiyo	Fuji TV	
1994	Furuhata Ninzaburō	Takako Nakaura	Fuji TV	Episode 11
1997	Gift	Rie Kikkawa	Fuji TV	Episode 4
2001	R-17	Sakurako Matsuzaki	TV Asahi	
2021	Emergency Interrogation Room	Toko Okuni	TV Asahi	Season 4, episodes 1 and 2
2025	Too Much	Aiko Remen	Netflix	Season 1, episode 7

== Honours ==
- Medal with Purple Ribbon (2008)
- Kinuyo Tanaka Award (2015)
- Order of the Rising Sun, 4th Class, Gold Rays with Rosette (2022)
