= Manabeshima =

Island in Okayama, Japan

Native name: 真鍋島 Manabe-shima
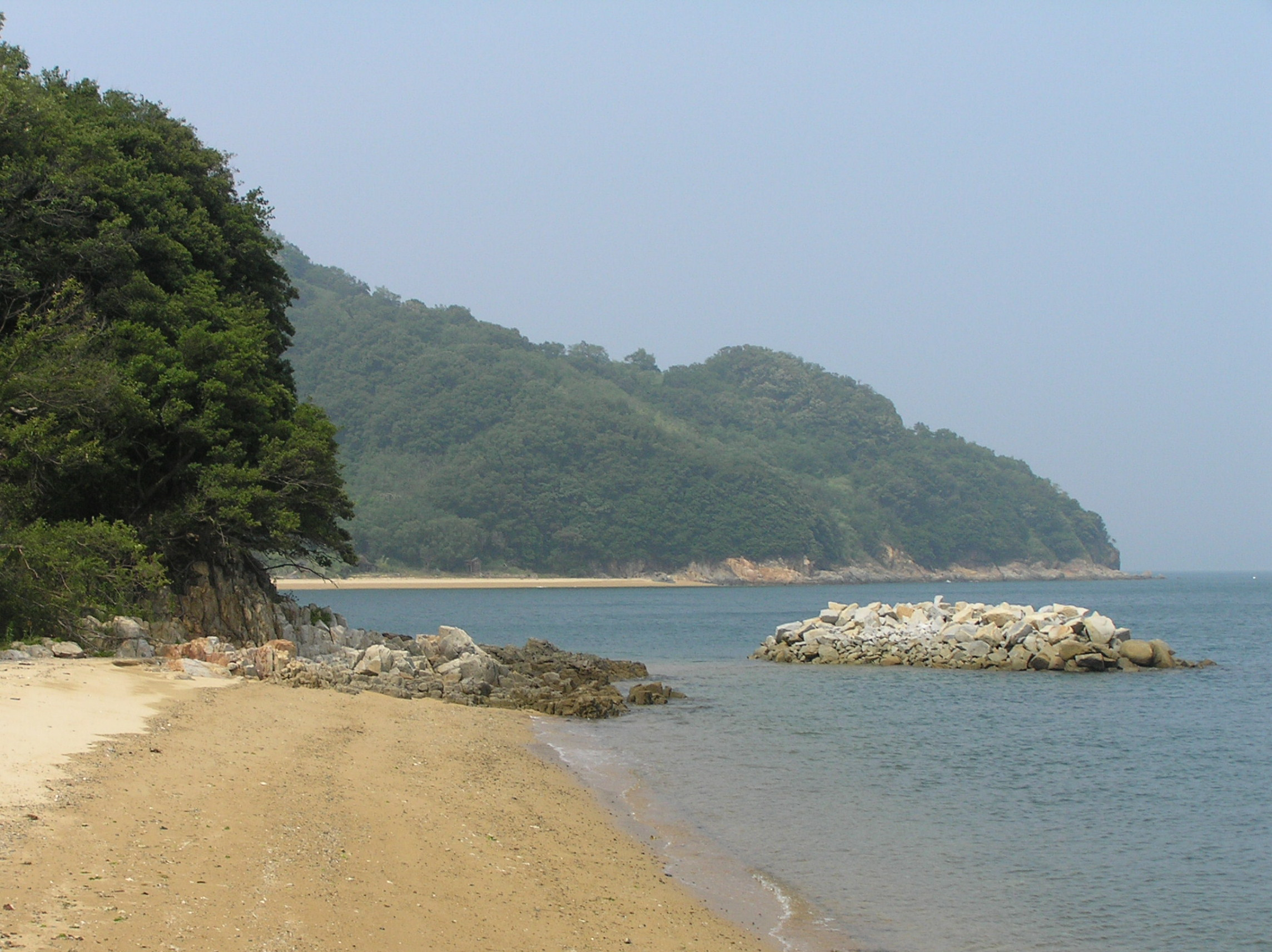
- Coastline of Manabeshima

- Location within Japan

Geography
- Location: Seto Inland Sea
- Coordinates: 34°21′18.5″N 133°34′42.9″E
- Area: 1.49 km^{2} (0.58 sq mi)
- Length: 7.6 km (4.72 mi)
- Highest point: 127

Administration
- Japan
- Prefecture: Okayama
- City: Kasaoka

Demographics
- Population: 312 (2005)
- Ethnic groups: Japanese

Manabeshima (真鍋島, Manabe-shima) is an island in the Seto Inland Sea, part of the municipality of Kasaoka, Okayama Prefecture, Japan. The island has an area of 1.49 square kilometers (0.57 square miles) and is one of the seven inhabited islands of the Kasaoka Islands group. The island's main commercial activity is fishing.

The island has come to international prominence due to its location as a film set and as the subject of a graphic narrative "Manabe Shima, Island Japan" by illustrator Florent Chavouet first published in France in 2010.

== Geography ==
The island is 31 kilometres (19 mi) by boat from the main Japanese island of Honshū. The island has few roads, but in the face of rural depopulation and downward demographic trends, has managed to retain both its elementary and junior high school. The island features sandy beaches and a mild year round climate. Kasaoka is the closest ferry port.

In 2016, key locations on the island were documented on Google Street View with a backpack mounted camera.

== Culture ==
Manabeshima was the setting for the 1984 film MacArthur's Children, describing the impact of the United States' occupation of Japan from the perspective of the inhabitants of a small island community. The film featured the feature film debut of actor Ken Watanabe starring alongside Masako Natsume and Shima Iwashita.

In 2010, French cartoonist Florent Chavouet published a travel book entitled "Manabe Shima" dedicated to the island and its inhabitants.

== See also ==
- Shiraishi Island, a larger inhabited island in the Kasaoka Islands group.
