= Demon Pond (1979 film) =

1979 Japanese film

- Film poster
- Directed by: Masahiro Shinoda
- Written by: Haruhiko Mimura; Tsutomu Tamura
- Based on: Demon Pond by Izumi Kyōka
- Starring: Tamasaburo Bando; Go Kato; Tsutomu Yamazaki
- Cinematography: Masao Kosugi; Noritaka Sakamoto
- Edited by: Zen Ikeda; Noritaka Sakamoto
- Music by: Isao Tomita
- Distributed by: Shochiku
- Release date: October 20, 1979 (Japan)
- Running time: 124 minutes
- Country: Japan
- Language: Japanese

Demon Pond (Japanese: 夜叉ヶ池, Hepburn: Yasha-ga-ike) is a 1979 Japanese romantic fantasy film directed by Masahiro Shinoda. It is an adaptation of the 1913 play of the same name by Izumi Kyōka, with an adapted screenplay written by Haruhiko Mimura and Tsutomu Tamura. The film stars Tsutomu Yamazaki, Go Kato, and Kabuki actor Tamasaburo Bando.

The film was largely well received by critics in Japan, and has since been well regarded in retrospective reviews as well.

== Plot ==
The story is set in Japan in the 1930s. Wandering through the countryside, a schoolteacher, Gakuen Yamasawa, arrives at a village suffering from severe drought. There, he discovers his long-lost friend, Akira, who is now married to Yuri, a rumored sorceress whose fate is intertwined with a bell that must be rung each day to appease a nearby lake's dragon god—otherwise, an apocalyptic flood will be unleashed upon the region. Desperate for water, the foolish villagers plan to sacrifice Yuri to the dragon. Meanwhile, a host of pond spirits, led by the lovesick Princess Shirayuki, debate whether they should save the humans from their doom, or allow the princess to see her lover, Kengamine. The villagers break into Yuri's home, intending to sacrifice her on the back of an ox. Akira and Gakuen return and try to convince the mob to spare Yuri, but the village leaders, including the Diet Member, refuse to listen. During the confrontation, Yuri commits suicide by stabbing herself with a sickle. Akira decides not to ring the bell and unleashes the flood, which destroys the village. He then commits suicide with the sickle. Gakuen survives by tying himself to a pillar of the belfry, while the corrupt village leaders drown in the flood. Princess Shirayuki, finally able to freely visit her lover, rises from the water with the other pond spirits and disappears into the sky.

== Cast ==
- Tamasaburo Bando as Yuri / Sharayuki (Yuki), the dragon princess
- Go Kato as Akira Hagiwara
- Tsutomu Yamazaki as Gakuen Yamasawa
- Koji Nanbara as Priest Shikami
- Yatsuko Tanami as Nurse
- Norihei Miki as Catfish messenger
- Fujio Tokita as Crab
- Hisashi Igawa as Carp
- Jun Hamamura as Yatabei, the bell keeper
- Megumi Ishii as Camellia
- Ryûnosuke Kaneda as Diet Member Kozo
- Juro Kara as Denkichi
- Toru Abe as Village leader
- Shigeru Yazaki as Village teacher
- Hatsuo Yamaya as Villager Yoju

== Production ==
In 1978, a popular stage production of the Demon Pond play was shown in Japan. This stirred interest in creating a film version of the play. Tamasaburo Bando, at the time a world-famous Kabuki onnagata actor, was brought on to star in the film playing the dual role of Yuri and Yuki. As this was Bando's film debut, he was not used to the idiosyncrasies of film, particularly, the use of closeups. He would frequently delay production and ask for retakes as he did not like the way his face appeared in closeup shots. The technique of using an actor for dual roles was previously used in Double Suicide, and is used to imply a relationship between the two characters even if a direct relationship is not explicitly made in the narrative. Additionally, both characters are played differently whereas the princess is bold and theatrical, while the young Yuki is played in a naturalistic fashion typical of cinema.

The film is based on a kabuki stage production, and follows some elements of the format such as a five act format. However, the film has the married couple embrace in a kiss which is atypical in kabuki but common in film.

Masao Kosugi was the cinematographer for the film, and had previously worked with Shinoda on The Assassin. The film's score, composed by Isao Tomita, heavily utilizes Moog synthesizers, mixing classical and electronic music genres. Scenes taking place on dry land are often accompanied by Tomita's arrangement of pieces by composer Claude Debussy, whereas underwater scenes are scored by Tomita's arrangement of Modest Mussorgsky's Pictures at an Exhibition.

Nobuo Yajima was hired as the special effects director for the film. He made extensive use of composite shots in the film, and utilized an optical printer to combine different shots. Blue screens and miniature sets were also used, particularly during the scene where the village floods. A water column coming from the pond was created by pouring water into a basin on a solid background, which was composited onto footage of the pond via an optical printer. The footage of water pouring was reversed to give the illusion that the water was rising out of the pond. Miniature sets were created of the village which were flooded with liters of water being poured on the sets. Matte effects were also used in shots where villagers are seen running from the deluge.

== Release ==
Shochiku released Demon Pond in Japanese theaters on October 20, 1979. Upon release, the film did well at the box office. Janus Films handled the American distribution of the film and it was screened at the 1985 Janus Films Festival.

Aside from one television broadcast on TV Asahi, the film was not re-released for 42 years. It would eventually be restored on 2021 to commemorate the 100th anniversary of Shochiku as a film distributor. Director Shinoda and actor Bando supervised a 4K restoration of the film, which aired on the Shochiku-operated channel Satellite Theater in March of that year. It was re-released theatrically in the following summer.

The restored version made its premiere at MoMA as the opener of its Beyond Ozu: Hidden Gems of Shochiku Studios series on June 10, 2022. The restored version was screened at the Cannes Film Festival in 2021. The Criterion Collection released the film on 4K, Blu-ray, and DVD on October of 2024, its first ever home video release in North America.

== Reception ==
Upon release, reviews in Japan praised Tamasaburo Bando's performance. In 1980, Variety wrote a critical review of the film saying “Occasional great images and self-evident ambitiousness provoke a continued extension of credit and patience throughout most of this exceedingly bizarre fantasy, but it ultimately goes unrewarded."

Janet Maslin of The New York Times, praised the film saying "The film has a primitive style at times, especially where its special effects are involved, and it also occasionally works harder than necessary to startle the audience. Most of the time, Mr. Shinoda casts a spell as powerful and persuasive as Tamasaburo's own."

Reviewers outside of Japan also praised Tamasaburo Bando's performance. Variety and New York times reviewers said that the gender of Bando was not obvious to them in the film.

Jacob Oller writing for the A.V. Club was positive about the film saying "Demon Pond evokes classic Japanese psychedelia like House, with Bando as its haunting, hallucinatory centerpiece." It was described by the critic Michael Atkinson as “a jolt of delicious weirdness.” In 2024, David Mermelstein writing in The Wall Street Journal praised the film.
