= Labyrinth of the Demon King =

2025 video game

- Developer: J. R. Hudepohl
- Publisher: Top Hat Studios
- Platforms: Windows, PlayStation 4, PlayStation 5, Xbox One, Xbox Series, Nintendo Switch
- Release: 13 May 2025
- Genres: Action, survival horror
- Mode: Single-player

Labyrinth of the Demon King is a 2025 video game developed by J. R. Hudepohl and published by Top Hat Studios. Upon release, the game received average reviews, with critics praising the game's atmospheric horror and visual similarity to PlayStation survival horror titles, whilst critiquing its design limitations.

== Gameplay ==
Gameplay screenshot

== Plot ==
War and disease have ravaged Feudal Japan, and demons roam the earth. The player is an Ashigaru of Takeda Nobumitsu, attempting to rid the world of the demons. The player is the sole survivor of the Takeda clan and its army, after the Demon King leads them into a trap. The player enters the titular Labyrinth to avenge their fallen Lord and destroy the Demon King.

== Development and release ==
Labyrinth of the Demon King was created by New Zealand independent developer J. R. Hudepohl. Hudepohl stated that the inspiration for the game's Japanese setting came from a visit to Kitagi Island in Japan, with the game's narrative influenced by Japanese mythology including the slaying of Shuten-dōji. The design was strongly shaped by Hudepohl's interest in survival horror titles, including both Resident Evil and Silent Hill for the atmosphere, Fatal Frame 2 and Onimusha for the Japanese environments, as well as Condemned: Criminal Origins for gameplay. The game was announced with the launch of a trailer in June 2024. A demo of the game was published for Steam Next Fest in February 2025, with a final trailer and release date announced in April. The game was released on 13 May 2025 for PC and console.

== Reception ==
Reception

Aggregate score
Aggregator	Score
Metacritic	71/100

Review scores
Publication	Score
Nintendo Life	8/10
PC Gamer (US)	81%
Bloody Disgusting	4.5/5
Siliconera	7/10

According to review aggregator Metacritic, Labyrinth of the Demon King received "mixed or average" reviews. Several critics compared the game favorably to PlayStation titles, including Silent Hill and King's Field.

Edwin Evans-Thirlwell of Rock Paper Shotgun praised the game's aesthetics, describing them as a "convincing encapsulation of the ambience of Silent Hill [games]" although noting its "appallingly sluggish movement". Describing the game as one of the best horror titles of the year, Bloody Disgusting commended its "cohesive vision" and "period-accurate aesthetics" as "one of the most masterfully crafted horror games in recent memory", although considered the player's increasing power over time to reduce the game's horror and difficulty. Matt Vatankhah of Vice recommended the game for its "terrifying" visuals and "chilling" soundtrack, considering it to balance its "cumbersome" design inspired by older survival horror titles with a "tinge of modernity".
