= Himiko (film) =

1974 film

- Film poster
- Directed by: Masahiro Shinoda
- Written by: Masahiro Shinoda; Taeko Tomioka
- Produced by: Kiyoshi Iwashita; Kinshirô Kuzui; Masahiro Shinoda
- Starring: Shima Iwashita
- Cinematography: Tatsuo Suzuki
- Edited by: Sachiko Yamaji
- Music by: Tōru Takemitsu
- Distributed by: Art Theatre Guild
- Release date: 9 March 1974 (Japan)
- Running time: 100 minutes
- Country: Japan
- Language: Japanese

Himiko (Japanese: 卑弥呼) is a 1974 Japanese religious epic film directed by Masahiro Shinoda. It was entered into the 1974 Cannes Film Festival Feature Film Competition.

== Plot ==
In an unnamed forest in seemingly ancient Japan, a woman named Himiko conducts rituals as the shaman and prophetess of the Sun God in the ruling kingdom of the Sun God people. Other tribes in the region are the Land People, worshippers of the ground, water, and animals, and the Mountain People, an unsightly group of mute wanderers conjoined by a rope. A lone traveler named Takehiko appears from the far side of the mountain and enters the forest.

Himiko spends her days weaving cloth on a loom and is pleased to hear of Takehiko's arrival. In a ritual, the king of the Sun God People, Ohkimi, discusses the visions seen by Himiko and the possibility of Mimaki succeeding the throne. Nashime, servant to Himiko, believes that Himiko will be the successor, as direct orders from the Sun God. Mimaki confides in his brother Ikume and King Ohkimi that he believes Himiko may be losing her ability to communicate with the Sun God due to her love for Takehiko, that the Land God and the Mountain God are false Gods, and that they should take over the other kingdoms and force them to believe in only the Sun God.

Takehiko meets Himiko in her quarters after dark, revealing that he is her half-brother. Despite this, she seduces him and they have sex while Adahime, one of the ritual assistants, watches from a distance. The next night, Himiko addresses the court subjects and states that the Sun God requires the people of the kingdom to accept the Land God and the Mountain God as valid Gods. King Ohkimi accuses her of having lost her prophetic powers, but Nashime assassinates the king while the subjects are all distracted by Himiko's speech. She takes over as queen and orders anyone who did not believe in the Sun God's words to be buried alive in the mountains.

Takehiko is resistant to stay with Himiko and continue their incestuous relationship, and he leaves the kingdom. Adahime follows him and professes her love for him, pleading him to have sex with her. He obliges, and Himiko is horrified and orders his arrest. Takehiko is captured and brought back to Himiko, who orders him to be tortured and banished. The Mountain God People carry him up the mountain where Adahime reunites with him.

Back in the Sun God Kingdom, Nashime consoles a broken Himiko, and she performs oral sex on him. Meanwhile, Mimaki and Ikume conspire to take power away from Himiko. Nashime keeps her locked away in her room and Mimaki takes the throne as king. Nashime then tells Mimaki that the young girl Toyo will take Himiko's place as the shaman and prophet of the Sun God. Mimaki declares war on the Land and Mountain God People. Takehiko and Adahime run away from the kingdom, but they are ambushed and killed by Mimaki's soldiers. Their corpses are shown to Himiko, who is devastated. Nashime concedes that Himiko has gone mad with love, so he frees the imprisoned Mountain God People, who torture and kill her. Overwhelmed with guilt, Nashime cries out for her in the mountains. Mimaki kills Ikume in a sword battle on a ridge.

The new prophetess, Toyo, declares the Sun God is still within Himiko and that the powerful country of Wei is to be given many slaves and offerings, which disturbs Mimaki and upsets Nashime. Years later, Nashime is walking in the forest, still wracked with guilt and grief over Himiko's death, when he looks up and sees a helicopter. The camera pans out to reveal that the forest is atop a kofun, an ancient keyhole-shaped burial mound, surrounded by a suburban neighborhood with offices, houses, factories and a highway. The credits roll with aerial shots of more ancient tumuli and their modern surroundings across Japan.

== Cast ==
- Shima Iwashita as Himiko
- Masao Kusakari as Takehiko
- Rie Yokoyama as Adahime
- Choichiro Kawarazaki as Mimaki
- Kenzo Kawarazaki as Ikume
- Yoshi Katō as Ohkimi
- Jun Hamamura as Narrator
- Tatsumi Hijikata as Dancer
- Rentarō Mikuni as Nashime
