= Cape of the North =

- Film poster
- Directed by: Kei Kumai
- Written by: Kei Kumai; Kunio Tsuji; Akiko Katsura
- Produced by: Masayuki Sato; Hideyuki Shiino
- Starring: Claude Jade; Go Kato; Kinuyo Tanaka
- Narrated by: Kaneko Iwasaki
- Cinematography: Mitsuji Kanau
- Edited by: Keiichi Uraoka
- Music by: Teizo Matsumura
- Production company: Toho
- Release date: April 3, 1976 (Japan)
- Running time: 113 minutes
- Country: Japan
- Language: Japanese

Cape of the North (Japanese: 北の岬, Hepburn: Kita no misaki), also known as Le Cap du Nord, is a 1976 Japanese drama film directed by Kei Kumai. The film, based on a novel by Kunio Tsuji, deals with the relationship between rich countries and the Third World. In the center of the story, Marie-Therese (Claude Jade), a Swiss religious missionary, meets the Japanese engineer Mitsuo (Go Kato) aboard a ship connecting Marseille to Yokohama. Theirs is a story of impossible love.

When French star Claude Jade arrived to play the role of the nun Marie-Therese, she was accompanied for the second part of shooting by her husband Bernard Coste. For journalists, it was agreed that officially he was the private secretary. Claude Jade said: I had to hide the existence of my husband and that I was pregnant [...] My pregnancy also prevents me from returning to Japan for the first release of the movie! Production is estimated that this condition is incompatible with the role of a nun, especially as the press believes me single.

The film has yet to see an NTSC release, nor one with an English translation.

== Cast ==
- Claude Jade as Marie-Therese
- Go Kato as Mitsuo
- Kinuyo Tanaka as Old Nun
- Tomoko Ogawa as Naoko
- Denise Péron as Sister Simone
- Françoise Guernier as Sister Andrée
- Wataru Kobayashi as Former mine worker
- Kayoko Onishi as Nun in Tokyo
- Martine Mathias as Marie-Therese's Mother
- Mini Sakuya as Nun in East Pakistan
- Kumi Soyama as Nun in Wakkanai
- Geruni Furansowazu
