= The Scandalous Adventures of Buraikan =

1970 Japanese film by Masahiro Shinoda

- Film poster
- Directed by: Masahiro Shinoda
- Screenplay by: Shūji Terayama
- Based on: Tenyasai Ueno no Hatsuhana by Kawatake Mokuami
- Produced by: Sanezumi Fujimoto
- Starring: Tatsuya Nakadai; Shima Iwashita; Shōichi Ozawa
- Cinematography: Kōzō Okazaki
- Edited by: Yoshi Sugihara
- Music by: Masaru Sato
- Production company: Ninjin Productions
- Distributed by: Toho
- Release date: April 18, 1970 (Japan)
- Running time: 104 minutes
- Country: Japan
- Language: Japanese

The Scandalous Adventures of Buraikan (Japanese: 無頼漢, Hepburn: Buraikan) is a 1970 Japanese film directed by Masahiro Shinoda. It was Japan's submission to the 43rd Academy Awards for the Academy Award for Best Foreign Language Film, but was not accepted as a nominee. The screenplay by Shūji Terayama was based on the stage play Tenyasai Ueno no Hatsuhana by Kawatake Mokuami.

== Cast ==
- Tatsuya Nakadai - Naojiro Kataoka
- Shima Iwashita - Michitose
- Shoichi Ozawa - Ushimatsu
- Fumio Watanabe - Moritaya Seizo
- Masakane Yonekura - Kaneko Ichinojo
- Kei Yamamoto
- Goro Tarumi
- Atsuo Nakamura
- Jun Hamamura - Kanoke-boshi
- Kamatari Fujiwara
- Yukio Ninagawa
- Kiwako Taichi - Namiji
- Hiroshi Akutagawa

== See also ==
- List of submissions to the 43rd Academy Awards for Best Foreign Language Film
- List of Japanese submissions for the Academy Award for Best Foreign Language Film
