= MacArthur's Children =

- Press kit cover
- Directed by: Masahiro Shinoda
- Written by: Takeshi Tamura
- Based on: Setouchi Shōnen Yakyū-dan by Yū Aku
- Produced by: Masato Hara
- Starring: Masako Natsume; Hideji Ōtaki; Haruko Kato; Ken Watanabe; Juzo Itami; Hiromi Go; Shima Iwashita
- Cinematography: Kazuo Miyagawa
- Edited by: Sachiko Yamaji
- Music by: Shin'ichirō Ikebe
- Release date: 23 June 1984 (Japan)
- Running time: 125 minutes
- Country: Japan
- Language: Japanese

MacArthur's Children (Japanese: 瀬戸内少年野球団, Hepburn: Setouchi Shōnen Yakyū-dan; lit. "The Boys' Baseball Team from Setouchi") is a 1984 Japanese film directed by Masahiro Shinoda. Describing the impact of the United States' occupation of Japan from the perspective of the inhabitants of a small, rural island community, the film featured the big screen debut of actor Ken Watanabe.

The film was selected as the Japanese entry for the Best Foreign Language Film at the 57th Academy Awards, but was not accepted as a nominee.

== Cast ==
- Takaya Yamauchi as Ryuta
- Yoshiyuki Omori as Saburo
- Shiori Sakura as Takeme "Mume" Hatano
- Masako Natsume as Komako
- Hideji Ōtaki as Ashigara
- Haruko Kato as Haru
- Ken Watanabe as Tetsuo
- Shima Iwashita as Tome
- Hiromi Go as Masao Nakai

== Production ==
- Yoshinobu Nishioka -Art direction

== Location ==
Filmed on Manabeshima, a small island fishing community in the Kasaoka Islands, of Okayama Prefecture on the Seto Inland Sea.

== See also ==
- Cinema of Japan
- List of submissions to the 57th Academy Awards for Best Foreign Language Film
- List of Japanese submissions for the Academy Award for Best Foreign Language Film
