= Demon Pond =

Demon Pond may refer to:

== Film and stage ==
- Demon Pond (play), a 1913 play by Kyōka Izumi
- Demon Pond (1979 film), a 1979 film adaptation of the Izumi play directed by Masahiro Shinoda
- Demon Pond (2005 film), a 2005 film adaptation of Keishi Nagatsuka's revision of Izumi's play directed by Takashi Miike
