= Killers on Parade =

- Theatrical release poster
- Directed by: Masahiro Shinoda
- Screenplay by: Shūji Terayama
- Produced by: Tetsuo Ueno
- Starring: Yûsuke Kawazu; Shima Iwashita; Ryōhei Uchida
- Cinematography: Masao Kosugi
- Edited by: Sachiko Yamaji
- Music by: Naozumi Yamamoto
- Distributed by: Shochiku
- Release date: 19 February 1961 (Japan)
- Running time: 88 minutes
- Country: Japan
- Language: Japanese

Killers on Parade (Japanese: 夕陽に赤い俺の顔, Hepburn: Yūhi ni Akai Ore no Kao), also known as My Face Red in the Sunset, is a 1961 Japanese satirical comedy directed by Masahiro Shinoda.

== Plot ==
When a band of assassins come after a young journalist she turns to another assassin for help.

== Cast ==
- Yūsuke Kawazu
- Shima Iwashita
- Kayoko Honoo
- Fumio Watanabe
- Kazuya Kosaka
- Kōji Mitsui
- Kō Nishimura
- Ichirō Sugai
- Shigeru Kōyama
