= Gonza the Spearman =

1986 film

- Film poster
- Directed by: Masahiro Shinoda
- Written by: Monzaemon Chikamatsu; Taeko Tomioka
- Produced by: Masayuki Motomochi
- Starring: Hiromi Gō; Haruko Kato
- Cinematography: Kazuo Miyagawa
- Edited by: Sachiko Yamaji
- Music by: Tōru Takemitsu
- Production companies: Shochiku-Fuji Company; Shochiku Film Distributors (Japan)
- Release date: 15 January 1986 (Japan)
- Running time: 126 minutes
- Country: Japan
- Language: Japanese

Gonza the Spearman (Japanese: 近松門左衛門 鑓の権三, Hepburn: Yari no gonza) is a 1986 Japanese drama film directed by Masahiro Shinoda. It was entered into the 36th Berlin International Film Festival, where it won the Silver Bear for outstanding artistic contribution.

== Cast ==
- Hiromi Gō as Gonza Sasano
- Haruko Kato as Oyuki's nanny
- Hideji Ōtaki as Iwaki
- Kuniko Miyake as Iwaki's wife
- Choichiro Kawarazaki as Jinbei
- Naoto Takenaka as Fumiemon
- Jun Hamamura
- Shoichi Ozawa
- Shōhei Hino as Hannojo
- Shima Iwashita as Osai
- Kaori Mizushima as Okiku
- Misako Tanaka as Oyuki

== Other Credits ==
- Sword fight arranger - Hiroshi Kuze
- Art Direction - Yoshinobu Nishioka
