= Kino Lorber =

American film and video distributor

- Formerly: Kino International
- Industry: Film; Home video
- Founded: 1976; 50 years ago
- Founder: Bill Pence
- Headquarters: New York City, New York, United States
- Products: Motion pictures
- Subsidiaries: MHz Networks
- Website: www.kinolorber.com

Kino Lorber is an international film distribution company based in New York City. Founded in 1976, it was originally known as Kino International until it was acquired by and merged into Lorber HT Digital in 2009. It specializes in art house films, such as documentary films, classic and rarely seen films from earlier periods in the history of cinema, and world cinema. In addition to theatrical distribution, Kino Lorber releases films in the home entertainment market and has its own streaming services for its digital library.

== History ==
=== 1976–2008: founding as Kino International ===
Kino Lorber was founded as Kino International in 1976 by Bill Pence, then vice president of Janus Films, and based in Colorado. It began by importing and releasing international films that may have not otherwise reached the market in the United States. The first films distributed by Kino were in association with Janus Films.

In 1977, Kino International was purchased by Donald Krim who at the time founded United Artists Classics. At this time, the company acquired rights to distribute theatrically films in the Janus Films library, which became the foundation for its international library of films. Two of the first films imported under Krim were Ballad of Orin and Peter Lilienthal's David.

Kino International was responsible for the theatrical release of films by Charlie Chaplin beginning in 1977, including the premiere of Woman of Paris. The Chaplin films became the foundation of a silent film collection for Kino International including the 1927 sci-fi film Metropolis.

By 1989, American classics accounted for 80 percent of the company's distributions, with the other 20 percent made up of international films.

=== 2009–present: merger with Lorber HT Digital ===
In 2009, Kino International was acquired by Lorber HT Digital to form Kino Lorber.

The merger combined the companies' film libraries and distribution operations, creating a catalog of more than 600 titles. Donald Krim, president of Kino International, and Richard Lorber, president and chief executive officer of Lorber HT Digital, became co-presidents of the newly formed company. Krim oversaw traditional distribution operations while Lorber was responsible for business development and corporate strategy.

Following Donald Krim's death in 2011, Richard Lorber became the company's sole chief executive, overseeing Kino Lorber's continued expansion in theatrical distribution, home entertainment, educational distribution, and digital streaming.

Kino Lorber launched its "Kino Lorber Studio Classics" line of films in 2014. Its licensing deal with MGM allowed them access to MGM's library of remastered and high-definition films. It released approximately 40 films by the end of 2014, including the Billy Wilder films Witness for the Prosecution and The Private Life of Sherlock Holmes.

In 2017, Kino Lorber entered into a partnership with Zeitgeist Films to co-acquire films for theatrical release and taking over home entertainment distribution of their library.

In 2019, Kino Lorber launched a digital streaming service known as "Kino Now." Described as an "arthouse iTunes," it allows the purchase and rentals of films in its distribution library.

During the COVID-19 pandemic lock-downs in 2020, Kino Lorber launched an online distribution service to stream new films in partnership with closed theaters. Known as "Kino Marquee," the service was seen as a way to help closed theaters generate revenue during the pandemic, splitting revenue equally with participating cinemas.

Kino Marquee received a Special Award from the New York Film Critics Circle in recognition of its role in helping independent movie theaters generate revenue during the COVID-19 pandemic.

In 2021, Kino Lorber launched "Kino Cult," a free ad-supported streaming channel for genre films. It also entered into a distribution agreement with Milestone Films, a New Jersey–based film company known for restoring and distribution of classic films outside the mainstream.

On August 29, 2023, Kino Lorber announced via email that "Kino Cult" was being replaced by "The Midnight Picture Show," "a new free streaming service featuring more movies from the deliciously dark and devilishly bizarre side of cinema."

In 2022, Kino Lorber acquired MHz Networks, parent company of the international streaming service MHz Choice, creating Kino Lorber Media Group and expanding the company's streaming and digital distribution businesses.

In 2023, the company launched Kino Film Collection, a subscription streaming service featuring curated selections from Kino Lorber’s library of classic, independent, arthouse, international, and documentary films.

== Filmography ==
By 2023, Kino Lorber had over 4,000 titles in its curated library.
