= Tetsuya Fujita =

Tetsuya Fujita may refer to:

- Ted Fujita (1920–1998), Japanese-American severe storms researcher
- Tetsuya Fujita (actor) (born 1978), Japanese actor
