= Masahiro Shinoda =

Japanese film director and screenwriter (1931–2025)

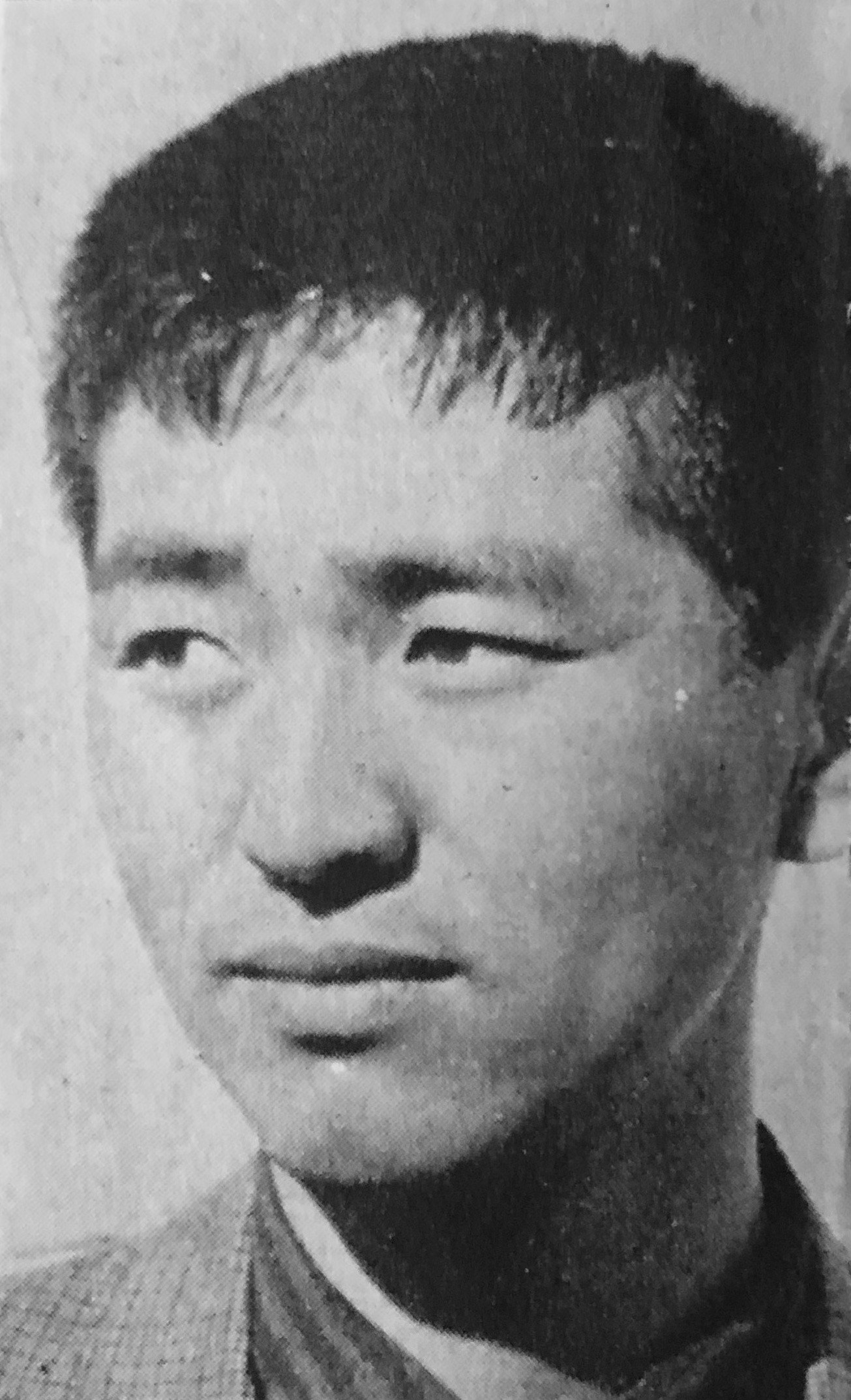
- Kinema Junpo, 1962
- Born: March 9, 1931; Gifu, Gifu Prefecture, Japan
- Died: March 25, 2025 (aged 94)
- Education: Waseda University
- Occupations: Film director, screenwriter
- Years active: 1960–2003
- Notable work: Pale Flower; Assassination; Double Suicide; Silence; Ballad of Orin; Childhood Days
- Spouse: Shima Iwashita (m. 1967)

Masahiro Shinoda (篠田 正浩, Shinoda Masahiro; March 9, 1931 – March 25, 2025) was a Japanese film director, whose career spanned over four decades and covered a wide range of genres and styles. He was one of the central figures of the Japanese New Wave during the 1960s and 1970s. He directed films for Shochiku Studio from 1960 to 1965, before turning to independent cinema from 1966 onward. His film style was characterized by socially marginalized characters, many of whom turn to crime or suicide, and meticulous attention to pictorial beauty. He drew on traditional Japanese fiction and theater and some of his films bear the influence of Kenji Mizoguchi, whom he admired.

== Early life ==
Shinoda was born on March 9, 1931, in Gifu Prefecture and attended Waseda University, where he studied theater and also participated in the Hakone Ekiden long-distance race.

== Career ==
Shinoda joined the Shōchiku Studio in 1953 as an assistant director, where he worked on films by such directors as Yasujirō Ozu. He debuted as a director in 1960 with One-Way Ticket for Love, which he also scripted.

His focus on youth and the cultural and political turmoil of 1960s Japan made him a central figure in the Shōchiku New Wave alongside Nagisa Ōshima and Yoshishige Yoshida. He worked in a variety of genres, from the yakuza film (Pale Flower) to the samurai film (Assassination), but he particularly became known for his focus on socially marginal characters and for an interest in traditional Japanese theater, which found its greatest expression in Double Suicide, in which actors are manipulated like Bunraku puppets. He also was interested in sports, directing a documentary on the 1972 Winter Olympics. Also known for his collaborations with such artists as Shūji Terayama and Tōru Takemitsu, Shinoda left Shōchiku in 1965 to form his own production company, Hyōgensha.

He retired from directing after the release of Spy Sorge, a biopic on the life of Richard Sorge, in 2003.

== Awards ==
His film Gonza the Spearman (1986) was entered into the 36th Berlin International Film Festival, where it won the Silver Bear for an outstanding artistic contribution. He won the 1991 Japan Academy Prize for Director of the Year for Childhood Days. His film Moonlight Serenade (1997) was entered into the 47th Berlin International Film Festival. He also won the Izumi Kyōka Prize in 2010 for a novel (Shinoda himself had earlier adapted a Kyōka novel for the screen for the 1979 film Demon Pond).

== Personal life and death ==
Masahiro Shinoda's first marriage was with Kazuko Shiraishi. The pair had one daughter, the artist Yuko Shiraishi. In 1967 he married the actress Shima Iwashita, who appears in several of his films.

Shinoda died of pneumonia on March 25, 2025, at the age of 94.

== Filmography ==
- One-Way Ticket to Love (恋の片道切符) (1960)
- Kawaita mizuumi (乾いた湖) (Dry Lake a.k.a. Youth in Fury) (1960)
- My Face Red in the Sunset (a.k.a. Killers on Parade) (夕陽に赤い俺の顔) (1961)
- Love New and Old (三味線とオートバイ) (1961)
- Epitaph to My Love (わが恋の旅路) (1961)
- Our Marriage (私たちの結婚) (1962)
- Tears on the Lion's Mane (涙を、獅子のたて髪に) a.k.a A Flame at the Pier (1962)
- Glory on the Summit (山の讃歌 燃ゆる若者たち) (1962)
- Kawaita hana (乾いた花) (Withered Flower, a.k.a. Pale Flower) (1964)
- Ansatsu (暗殺) (Assassination) (1964)
- With Beauty and Sorrow (美しさと哀しみと) (1965)
- Ibun Sarutobi Sasuke (異聞猿飛佐助) (The Strange Story of Sarutobi Sasuke, a.k.a. Samurai Spy) (1965)
- Captive's Island a.k.a. Punishment Island (処刑の島) (1966)
- Clouds at Sunset (あかね雲) (1967)
- Shinjū ten no Amijima (心中天網島) (Amijima Effaced to Heaven by Lovers' Suicide, a.k.a. Double Suicide) (1969)
- The Scandalous Adventures of Buraikan (無頼漢) (1970)
- Chinmoku / Silence (沈黙 / Silence) (1971)
- Sapporo Winter Olympics (札幌オリンピック) (1972)
- The Petrified Forest (化石の森) (1973)
- Himiko (卑弥呼) (1974)
- Under the Blossoming Cherry Trees (桜の森の満開の下) (1975)
- Ballad of Orin (はなれ瞽女おりん) (1977)
- Demon Pond (夜叉ケ池) (1979)
- Akuryo Island (悪霊島) (1981)
- MacArthur's Children (瀬戸内少年野球団) (1984)
- Allusion (転生譚) (1985)
- Gonza the Spearman (近松門左衛門 鑓の権三) (1986)
- The Dancing Girl (舞姫) (1989)
- Childhood Days (少年時代) (1990)
- Sharaku (写楽 Sharaku) (1995)
- Setouchi Moonlight Serenade (1997)
- Owls' Castle (1999)
- Spy Sorge (2003)
