= Kyu-chan no Dekkai Yume =

- DVD cover
- Directed by: Yoji Yamada
- Starring: Kyu Sakamoto; Chieko Baisho; Muga Takewaki; Shunji Sayama; Hiroshi Inuduka
- Music by: Yamamoto Naozumi
- Release date: January 2, 1967
- Running time: 89 min.
- Language: Japanese

Kyu-chan no Dekkai Yume (九ちゃんのでっかい夢; Kyu-chan's Big Dream) is a 1967 Japanese comedy film by film director Yoji Yamada.

== Plot summary ==
The movie begins in an old castle in Europe with a very old woman lying in bed, most likely dying. A priest, a nun and a man are praying in front of her bed. As they are praying, another man enters. He is a Japanese actor who, in broken German, says that he must talk to the old woman. The priest tries to hush him, but the old woman tells him to come in.

== Cast ==
- Chieko Baisho
- Muga Takewaki
- Hiroshi Inuzuka
- Ichirō Arishima
- Yumiko Kokonoe
