= Shiraishi Island =

Shiraishi Island 白石島
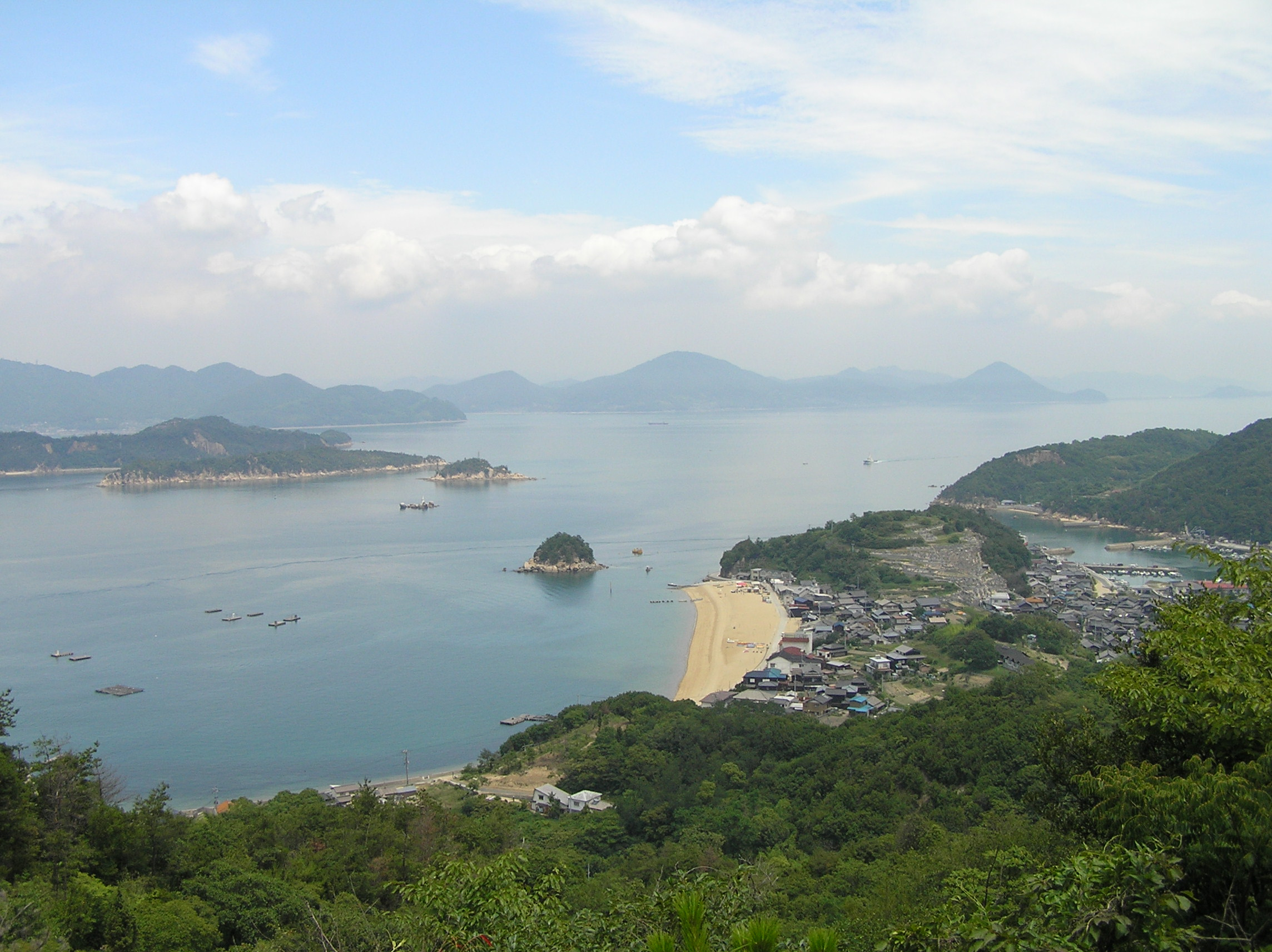
- View from a hill of Shiraishi Island

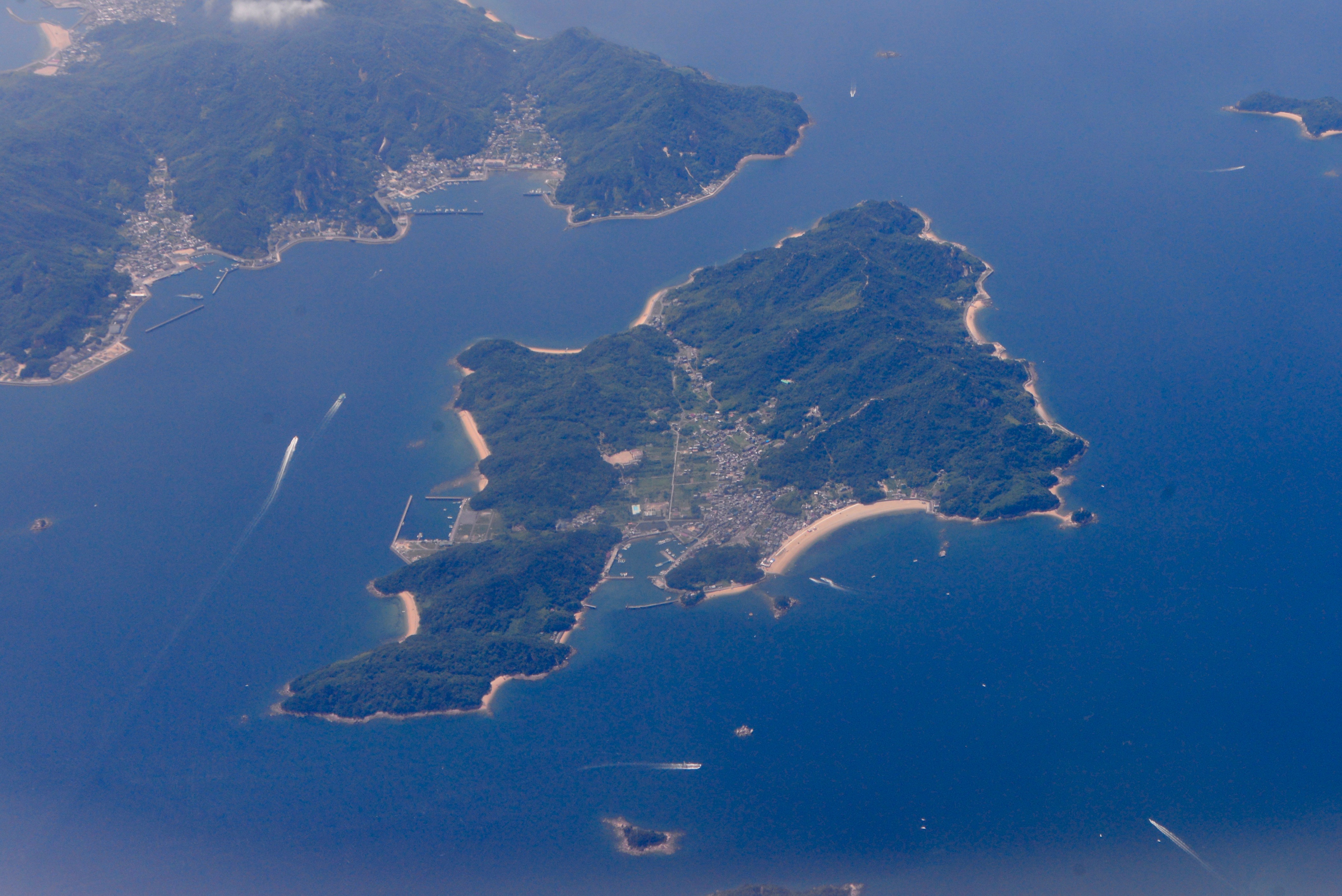
- Aerial photo of the island
- Coordinates: 34°24′10″N 133°31′18″E
- Country: Japan
- Region: Honshū
- Prefecture: Okayama Prefecture
- Municipality: Kasaoka
- Time zone: UTC+9 (Japan Standard Time)
- Website: www.shiraishiisland.com

Shiraishi Island (白石島, Shiraishi-jima) is an island in the Inland Sea of Japan and is considered part of the municipality of Kasaoka, Okayama Prefecture. It is one of six inhabited islands in the Kasaoka Islands, a chain of islands most easily reached from the port city of Kasaoka on Japan's main island, Honshū.

== Demographics ==
Shiraishi Island has a year-round, resident population of about 350 people.

== Travel and transport ==
Shiraishi can be reached by scheduled ferry service from Kasaoka. The island is served by both passenger and car ferries, and it takes from 20 to 40 minutes depending on which ferry (standard or express) one takes. There are a small number of cars and other vehicles on the island. The island has one 6-km road that follows the circumference of the island. Most places are accessibly by walking. There is no bicycle rental.

== Economy: Tourism, fishing and agriculture ==
Most of the resident men work as fisherman while many of the women work in vegetable gardens. In the summertime, Shiraishi Island is a popular tourist and weekend destination. Summertime visitors enjoy the island's sand beaches and the views out on the Inland Sea. The island is often visited by international visitors to Japan, partly because the government operates an inexpensive guesthouse on the island exclusively for international visitors called the Shiraishi International Villa. This is Western style accommodation with a shared bathroom, toilets, and kitchen. Japanese style accommodation is available along the beach.
