= Sōgen Asahina =

Japanese Rinzai zen master

Sōgen Asahina (朝比奈宗源, Asahina Sōgen, January 9, 1891 – August 25, 1979) was an influential Japanese Rinzai zen master and founder of Nippon wo Mamoru kai. He was also a prolific writer and a calligrapher.

Born in Shizuoka Prefecture, Asahina graduated from Nihon University. He studied at Myōshin-ji in Kyoto and at Engaku-ji in Kamakura. He rose to become the head (kanchō (管長)) of the Engaku-ji branch of Rinzai Zen. Also, he was a professor at Komazawa University.

Asahina's works include Zen (bilingual, English and Japanese; 1954), Nippon no Zen (1959) and commentaries on the Hekiganroku and Rinzairoku.

Asahina was also an accomplished calligrapher. Television shows, including Mito Kōmon and Ōoka Echizen, featured his writing in their title screens. His writing can also be seen in the memorial to Gichin Funakoshi at Engaku-ji.

== Sources ==
This article incorporates material from 朝比奈宗源 (Asahina Sōgen) in the Japanese Wikipedia, retrieved on March 16, 2008.
