= Tsukumo Shell Mound =

Ancient shell midden in Kasaoka, Japan

- 津雲貝塚 (Japanese)
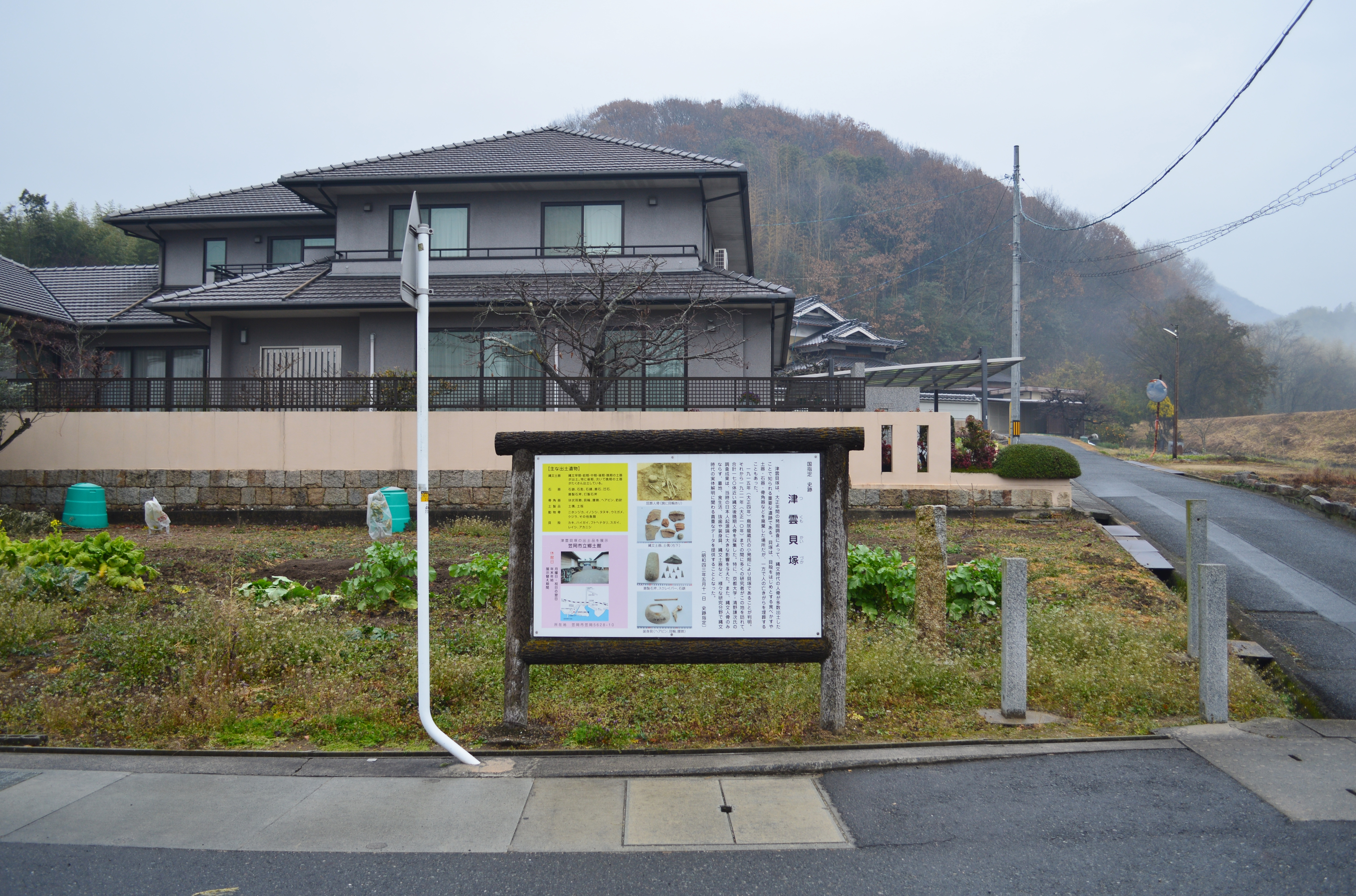
- Tsukumo Shell Mound

- Tsukumo Shell Mound Tsukumo Shell Mound (Japan)
- Interactive map of Tsukumo Shell Mound
- 34°29′4.2″N 133°31′59.8″E
- Type: shell midden
- Periods: Jōmon period
- Location: Kasaoka, Okayama, Japan
- Region: San'yō region

Site notes
- Public access: Yes (park)

The Tsukumo Shell Mound (津雲貝塚, Tsukumo kaizuka) is an archaeological site in the Nishioshima neighborhood of the city of Kasaoka, Okayama Prefecture, in the San'yō region of western Japan. It contains a Jōmon period shell midden, and was designated a National Historic Site in 1968.

== Overview ==
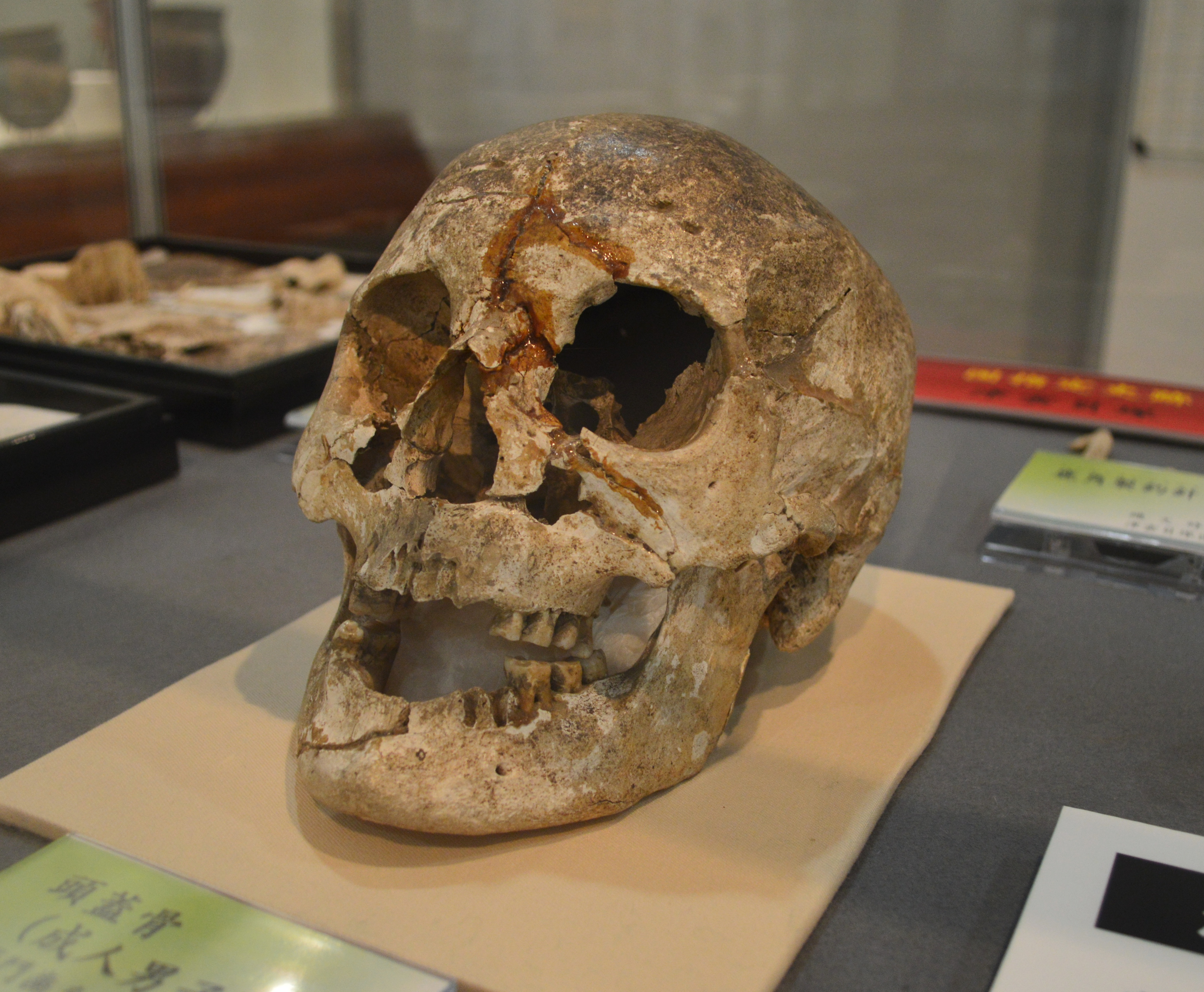
Skull from Tsukumo Shell Mound, with pulled teeth

During the early to middle Jōmon period (approximately 4000 to 2500 BC), sea levels were five to six meters higher than at present, and the ambient temperature was also 2 deg C higher. During this period, the Kantō region was inhabited by the Jōmon people, many of whom lived in coastal settlements. The middens associated with such settlements contain bone, botanical material, mollusc shells, sherds, lithics, and other artifacts and ecofacts associated with the now-vanished inhabitants, and these features, provide a useful source into the diets and habits of Jōmon society. Most of the 2400 known shell middens are found along the Pacific coast of Japan.

The Tsukumo Shell Mound is located on sloping land facing south near the Mizushima Sea, with an area of about 60 meters north-to-south and about 40 meters east-to-west. During the Jōmon period, this area was an inlet of the Seto Inland Sea. In 1867, human bones were discovered during embankment construction, and several archaeological excavations were conducted from 1915. Artifacts from the early through final Jōmon period, such as Jōmon pottery of the late Jōmon period, were unearthed, but the most important discovery was about 170 human remains from the late Jōmon period. Most of the burial postures were in crouched positions with both hands and feet bent. The heads were oriented from northeast-to-southeast, aligned with the movement of the sun. It was also found that many skulls exhibited ritual tooth extraction of the front incisors. Some of the burials were accompanied by various grave goods such as shell rings, earrings, and waist ornaments as well as stone arrowheads, dogū and bone implements. A late pottery burial of an infant was also found. The presence of many fishing hooks and stone fishing weights among the excavated items indicates that fishing activities was an important occupation of the inhabitants.

The site is on private property, and is marked with a placard. Some of the excavated artifacts are displayed at the Kasaoka Municipal Folk Museum.

On June 23, 2021, a research team consisting of the University of Oxford and others in the United Kingdom was investigating the bones of an adult male from this site which was radiocarbon dated to between 1370 BC and 1010 BC. The bones had 790 wounds, which were determined to have been caused by a shark attack, most likely a tiger shark or a great white shark, making Tsukumo No. 24 the world's oldest known shark victim.

== See also ==
- List of Historic Sites of Japan (Okayama)
