= Childhood Days =

- DVD cover
- Directed by: Masahiro Shinoda
- Screenplay by: Taichi Yamada
- Based on: The Long Road by Hyozo Kashiwabara
- Produced by: Motoo Abiko
- Starring: Tetsuya Fujita; Yuji Horioka
- Cinematography: Tatsuo Suzuki
- Edited by: Chizuko Osada
- Music by: Shin'ichirō Ikebe
- Production company: Childhood Days Production Committee
- Distributed by: Toho
- Release date: August 11, 1990 (Japan)
- Running time: 117 minutes
- Country: Japan
- Language: Japanese

Childhood Days (Japanese: 少年時代, Hepburn: Shōnen jidai), also known as Takeshi - Childhood Days, is a 1990 Japanese film directed by Masahiro Shinoda. It was chosen as Best Film at the 14th Japan Academy Prize ceremony. It is based on two sources: the novel The Long Road by Hyozo Kashiwabara, and a manga adaptation of the novel by Fujiko Fujio.

== Synopsis ==
The film is a story of childhood life during wartime Japan. Takeshi, the intelligent son of a fisherman, is the schoolyard bully.

When his cousin comes to stay with his family to avoid bombing raids, Takeshi at first treats him well then begins bullying him, too. Takeshi eventually loses his position of leadership.

== Cast ==
- Tetsuya Fujita as Shinji Kazama
- Yuji Horioka as Takeshi Ohara
- Katsuhisa Yamazaki as Futoshi Tanabe
- Kensuke Sudo as Minako Saiki
- Shima Iwashita as Shizue Kazama
- Toshiyuki Hosokawa as Shusaku Kazama
- Choichiro Kawarazaki as Tatsuo Kazama
- Kazuyo Mita as Shige Kazama
- Nobuko Sendo as Akiko Tanabe
- Mitsue Suzuki as Maki Kazama
- Shinsuke Ashida as principal
- Hideji Otaki as stationmaster
- Kyosen Ohashi as photographer

== Reception ==
=== Awards and nominations ===
14th Japan Academy Prize

- Won: Best Picture
- Won: Best Director - Masahiro Shinoda
- Won: Best Screenplay - Taichi Yamada
- Won: Best Music - Shin’ichirō Ikebe
- Won: Best Art Direction - Takeo Kimura
- Won: Best Sound Recording - Hideo Nishizaki
- Won: Rookie of the Year - Tetsuya Fujita
- Nominated: Best Actress - Shima Iwashita
- Nominated: Best Cinematography - Tatsuo Suzuki
- Nominated: Best Lighting Direction - Kenichi Mizuno
- Nominated: Best Film Editing - Chizuko Osada
