= Muga Takewaki =

Japanese actor (1944–2011)

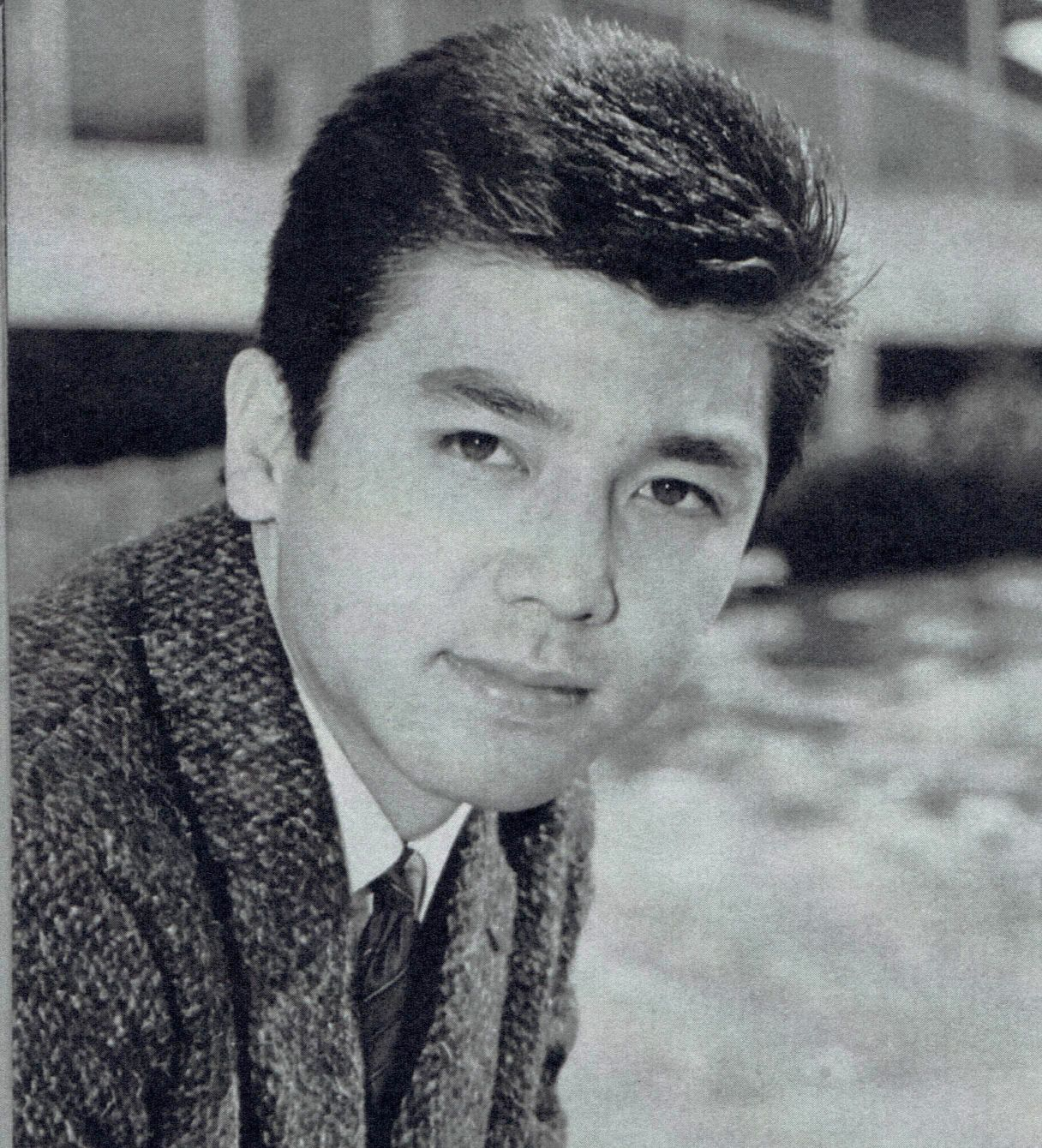
- Muga in 1966
- Born: February 17, 1944; Akibo, Chiba Prefecture, Japan
- Died: August 21, 2011 (aged 67); Ōta, Tokyo, Japan
- Occupation: Actor

Muga Takewaki (竹脇無我, Takewaki Muga; February 17, 1944 – August 21, 2011) was a Japanese actor.

== Filmography ==
=== Film ===
- Assassination (1964)
- Kyu-chan no Dekkai Yume (1967)
- Mito Kōmon (1978)
- Shōsetsu Yoshida Gakkō (1983) - Eisaku Satō
- Four Sisters (1985)
- Lost in the Wilderness (1986)

=== Television ===
- Sannin Kazoku (1968–1969) - Shibata Yūichi
- Futari no Sekai (1970–1971)
- Ōoka Echizen (1970–2006) - Sakakibara Iori
- Kunitori Monogatari (1973) - Ashikaga Yoshiteru
- Fujin no Mon (1980) - Sanada Yukimura
- Sekigahara (1981) - Hosokawa Tadaoki
- Miyamoto Musashi (1984–85) - Yagyū Munenori
- Tabaruzaka (1987) - Sakamoto Ryōma
