= Moonlight Serenade (1997 film) =

1997 film

- Theatrical release poster
- Directed by: Masahiro Shinoda
- Screenplay by: Katsuo Naruse
- Based on: Setouchi mūnraito serenāde by Yū Aku
- Produced by: Masaru Koibuchi; Taketo Niitsu
- Starring: Kyōzō Nagatsuka
- Cinematography: Tatsuo Suzuki
- Edited by: Hirohide Abe
- Music by: Shin'ichirō Ikebe
- Production companies: Fuji Television; Office Two-One; Pony Canyon
- Distributed by: Shochiku
- Release date: 15 March 1997 (Japan)
- Running time: 117 minutes
- Country: Japan
- Language: Japanese

Moonlight Serenade (Japanese: 瀬戸内ムーンライト・セレナーデ, Hepburn: Setouchi mūnraito serenāde) is a 1997 Japanese drama film directed by Masahiro Shinoda. It was entered into the 47th Berlin International Film Festival.

== Cast ==
- Kyōzō Nagatsuka as Koichi / Elder Keita
- Hideyuki Kasahara as Onda Keita, younger
- Jun Toba as Koji
- Shima Iwashita as Fuji
- Hinano Yoshikawa as Yukiko
- Michiko Hada as Komachi
- Junji Takada as Black Marketeer
- Toshiya Nagasawa
- Sayuri Kawauchi as Onda Hideko
- Shōhei Hino
- Chōichirō Kawarazaki
- Akaji Maro
- Takashi Tsumura as Interpreter
