= Sosa Kenji Ukon Makoto no Satsujin Chosho =

TV program

Sosa Kenji Ukon Makoto no Satsujin Chosho (捜査検事・右近誠の殺人調書) is a Japanese TV program and a series of Japanese TV dramas.

== Sosa Kenji Ukon Makoto no Satsujin Chosho 1 ==
Prosecutor Makoto Ukon (Go Kato) knows Midori (Yuki Nishida)'s father who had taught her in their home died. Ukon visited them on the eve of the funeral day of her father, and Ukon witnessed she rejected her woman visitor. Midori's father had run a bistro (not only French cookings but also others), had his shop usurped by a restaurant, and it is supported that he killed himself. It is Kinue, a wife of the president of the restaurant, that was rejected by Midori.

- Broadcaster TV Asahi
- Date of Broadcast Saturday, June 10, 2000
- Time of Broadcast 21:00-22:52 (Japan Time)
- Times of Broadcast once
- Name of Program Doyo Wide Gekijo (It means "Saturday Wide Theater")
- Rebroadcast Several times
- Writer Etsuko Kobayashi
- Main producers Nobuo Koga, Koichi Hanawa
- Main Directors Yoshimiki Onoda (as chief director of this program)
- Main actors

Go Kato, Juri Uzurano, Koichi Miura, Haruka Sugata, Seiya Nakano, Koichi Makijima, Kyoko Nakano, Kyoko Iguchi, Aya Shimoto, Yuki Nishida, Kazuo Tachibana, Fuki Ochiai

- Authoring Company Haiyuza, TV Asahi
- Main Song promised you

== Sosa Kenji Ukon Makoto no Sataujin Chosho 2 ==
- Date of broadcast: December 9, 2000

== Sosa Kenji Ukon Makoto no Satsujin Chosho 3 ==
- Year of broadcast: 2005
