= A Legend or Was It? =

1963 film by Keisuke Kinoshita

- Film poster
- Kanji: 死闘の伝説
- Directed by: Keisuke Kinoshita
- Written by: Keisuke Kinoshita
- Produced by: Masao Shirai; Keisuke Kinoshita
- Starring: Shima Iwashita; Gō Katō; Mariko Kaga; Kinuyo Tanaka
- Cinematography: Hiroyuki Kusuda
- Edited by: Yoshi Sugihara
- Music by: Chūji Kinoshita
- Production company: Shochiku
- Distributed by: Shochiku
- Release date: 11 August 1963 (Japan)
- Running time: 83
- Country: Japan
- Language: Japanese

A Legend or Was It? (死闘の伝説, Shitō no densetsu), also known as Legend of a Duel to the Death, is a 1963 Japanese drama film written and directed by Keisuke Kinoshita. It is considered one of Kinoshita's darkest films, marking a shift from his generally "safer" domestic dramas to a more cynical tone criticizing Japan's wartime collectivism.

== Plot ==
The film opens in contemporary Hokkaido (the 1960s) in lush, vibrant color. The narrator introduces a peaceful and cordial unnamed village. Life goes on quietly and neighbors are highly friendly and cooperative, yet there's a dark undercurrent to this community. The narrator reveals that 20 years earlier, a horrific series of events took place. The villagers refuse to talk about it, completely erasing it from their collective memory.

The film shifts to black-and-white photography as a flashback to World War II begins. In the summer of 1945, the Sonobe family are evacuees to Hokkaido from firebombed Tokyo, consisting of five siblings, their mother Shizuko (Kinuyo Tanaka), and their grandmother Umeno (Kikue Mōri). Hideyuki Sonobe (Gō Katō) returns from active duty to recuperate from an injury. Meanwhile, his unnamed brother in the Air Corps and their engineer father are listed as MIA by the Imperial Army. The family lives at the outskirts of the village, in a dilapidated cottage with a rough field to grow their own food.

Hideyuki meets up with his sister Kieko (Shima Iwashita) as they're carried back to the village by a wagon, escorted by the Mayor Takamori's son Goichi (Bunta Sugawara) on horseback. Kieko informs Hideyuki that Goichi had repeatedly proposed marriage to her, while she refused each attempt. Hideyuki instantly recognizes the fully uniformed Goichi as a member of his unit in China. Goichi had committed war crimes alongside his men, including the rape and murder of Chinese women. In the present, Goichi is arrogant, entitled and possesses a short temper, instantly lashing out at anyone who mocks his ruined hand. Riding his horse everywhere and waving a riding crop, he asserts dominance over the villagers who see him as a war hero.

Despite Mayor Kimbei Takamori (Tatsuya Ishiguro) being a mediator between the villagers and the Sonobes, relations between the evacuees and the Takamori household have soured in part to Kieko's refusal to marry Goichi. After settling back home, Hideyuki informs the family of Goichi's atrocities abroad and officially turns down the marriage proposal. The Sonobes expect that this action will bring reprecussions to them. To offset their worries, Hideyuki visits the Shimizus, a fellow evacuee family consisting of father Shintaro (Yoshi Katō) and his tomboy daughter Yuri (Mariko Kaga), to request their support in this matter. Shintaro has good relations with the locals and Yuri, who secretly loves Hideyuki, often joins him on hunting trips, already an expert marksman herself.

Not long after the marriage proposal is turned down, the Sonobes field is vandalized. The family suspects Goichi, but the police are unwilling to investigate, hoping not to stir up trouble with false accusations. Other fields are similarly vandalized, which causes rumors to spread about the Sonobes and Shimizus. Tensions escalate further as the war effort claims more young lives abroad, including several villagers' sons. Hideyuki recovers from his injury and is sent back to the frontlines, sharing an emotional farewell with Yuri who sees him off.

Weeks later, news of the atomic bombings of Hiroshima and Nagasaki further cause outrage in the community and blame is shifted on the evacuees, isolating them further. Things come to a head when Goichi and Kieko pass each silently on a stormy day. Kieko ignores Goichi's presence, infuriating him. Following her, he insists on giving her a ride back to her home, which she refuses before running from him. Goichi gives chase and falls off his horse. In a maddened state, he corners Kieko and drags her to the woods. Yuri spots them and runs to assist Kieko. After a violent struggle, Yuri bludgeons Goichi with a rock, killing him. The pair escape to the Shimizu residence, but are witnessed by a villager who discovers Goichi's body and alerts other men nearby.

At the Shimizu residence, Yuri scares off the initial angry mob with a rifle, before escaping through the backdoor with Kieko into the wilderness. Shintaro runs to the Sonobe household to warn off Shizuko, Umeno and younger sister Kagari. Not willing to leave their household for the harsh wilderness of Hokkaido, Shizuko travels to the village alone to negotiate with Mayor Takamori.

The whole village is informed of the killing. Overcome with blind rage, several men form a posse, goaded on by a furious Takamori. They capture the younger Sonobe brother, Norio (Tsutomu Matsukawa), intending to punish him over Goichi's death. Norio is severely injured when one of the villagers hits him over the head with a club. Despite the lone policeman's warnings not to escalate things, the posse rides on horseback to the Sonobe household and confront Shintaro and Umeno. A violent altercation ensues and Umeno is fatally shot after provoking a grieving villager who lost his son. The man is shot dead in turn by Shintaro and the posse burns down the household, while Shintaro and Kagari flee into the woods.

Hideyuki returns following his dismissal from the Imperial Army. He's brought to the police station to find his brother dead and the whole village in a frenzied state. Informed of the prior events, he joins a group of horseback policemen from a neighboring area to rein in the posse before they capture or kill his family and Shimizus. A siege takes place at the outskirts of the village as the Sonobes and Shimizus are surrounded and fired at by the posse. In the ensuing gunfight, Yuri, Shintaro and a villager are killed. Hiroyuki arrives just in time to stop the villagers from killing Kieko who picks up Yuri's rifle in a bid to fend off her attackers. Cradling Yuri's lifeless body in his arms, a weeping Hiroyuki finally realizes she loved him this whole time.

The film's epilogue shifts back to the present in full color. As the villagers help a van stuck in a ditch, the narrator reminds the audience that the modern day prosperity was built on an atrocity that the village chooses to forget.

== Cast ==
- Shima Iwashita as Kieko Sonobe
- Gō Katō as Hideyuki Sonobe
- Mariko Kaga as Yuri Shimizu
- Tsutomu Matsukawa as Norio Sonobe
- Kinuyo Tanaka as Shizuko Sonobe
- Bunta Sugawara as Goichi Takamori
- Yoshi Katō as Shintaro Shimizu
- Kikue Mōri as Umeno Sonobe
- Tokue Hanazawa as Yamanosuke
- Tatsuya Ishiguro as Kimbei Takamori

== Legacy ==
A Legend or Was It? was screened at the 2012 Filmex as part of its retrospective on Keisuke Kinoshita, and at the Berlin International Film Festival in 2013 in the "Forum" section.
