= Double Suicide (1969 film) =

1969 film directed by Masahiro Shinoda

- Film poster
- Directed by: Masahiro Shinoda
- Written by: Taeko Tomioka; Tōru Takemitsu
- Produced by: Masahiro Shinoda; Masayuki Nakajima
- Starring: Kichiemon Nakamura; Shima Iwashita; Hosei Komatsu; Yusuke Takita; Kamatari Fujiwara
- Cinematography: Toichiro Narushima
- Music by: Tōru Takemitsu
- Color process: Black and White
- Distributed by: Toho Company
- Release dates: 24 May 1969 (Japan); 11 February 1970 (U.S.)
- Running time: 105 minutes
- Country: Japan
- Language: Japanese

Double Suicide (Japanese: 心中天網島, Hepburn: Shinjū Ten no Amijima) is a 1969 Japanese historical drama film directed by Masahiro Shinoda. It is based on the 1721 bunraku (traditional puppet theatre) play The Love Suicides at Amijima by Monzaemon Chikamatsu.

== Plot ==
Jihei works as a paper merchant in the Tenma neighborhood of Osaka. He is married to his cousin, Osan, but is having an affair with a popular courtesan named Koharu. Jihei has promised twenty-nine times to free her from her five-year contract at the Kinokuni brothel, but he lacks the money required: ten kan of silver. Koharu is desperate to stop her work as a prostitute and asks Jihei to kill her. Jihei says if she dies he will kill himself too, and they decide to commit shinjū.

When Koharu returns to the Kinokuni brothel, a rich merchant named Tahei comes in and says he would like to free her from her contract. Koharu accuses Tahei of spreading rumors about Jihei's lack of wealth. Tahei tells Koharu's madam that he will pay any amount to sleep with Koharu, but the madam tells him that Koharu already has a client for the night, a samurai.

When the samurai arrives, Koharu refuses to make eye contact. The samurai asks Koharu what the issue is, and she explains her contract as well as her plans to commit shinjū with Jihei. The samurai discourages her from suicide, and she realizes doing so would leave her widowed mother with no one to care for her. The samurai pledges to help Koharu pay off her contract, and the two head to bed.

Meanwhile, Tahei has gone to a bar and is loudly speaking about Koharu's samurai client. Jihei overhears this and heads to the Kinokuni brothel to confront Koharu. When he gets to the brothel, he overhears Koharu and the samurai's conversation. Furious, he tries to stab the samurai through a window, but is apprehended. The samurai ties Jihei's arm to the window and leaves him there.

Tahei then comes across Jihei tied up and mocks him and calls him a thief, assuming that's the reason he's tied up. The samurai comes out and reprimands Tahei for lying, as Jihei stole nothing. He encourages Jihei to kick Tahei, which Jihei does. A mob then surrounds Tahei and chases him out of town. Back inside the teahouse, Jihei realizes the samurai is his brother, Magoemon, in disguise. Jihei begs for Magoemon's forgiveness and scolds Koharu for cheating on him. Magoemon tells Jihei he is a fool for letting Koharu seduce him, and says that he saw Koharu for a fraud the moment he met her. Magoemon tells Jihei that Osan's father, Gozaemon, is upset with Jihei for his affair with Koharu and plans to take Osan back. Jihei promises he is done with Koharu. Magoemon finds a letter addressed to Koharu from Osan, but doesn't mention it to Jihei.

A few weeks later in Jihei's home and paper shop, Osan's servants, Otama and Sangoro, are late for dinner. They arrive with Jihei's children, Kantaro and Osue, and Otama tells Osan that she saw Magoemon heading toward the shop with Osan's mother. Osan wakes up Jihei who was napping, and he starts pretending to work. When Osan's mother arrives with Magoemon, she tells Jihei that she heard a rumor from a member of her prayer group that a wealthy merchant from Tenma was set to free Koharu in a few days. She assumes that said merchant is Jihei, but Jihei tells her it must be Tahei. Osan's mother is consoled but say that Gozaemon will not be as easily convinced. She asks Jihei for a written oath that he is no longer involved with Koharu, which he obliges, and she leaves.

Later that night, Osan finds Jihei crying. She thinks he is crying because he still loves Koharu, but he insists he doesn't. Osan reveals that she wrote a letter to Koharu and begged her to betray Jihei so he would get over her because she was worried that he would kill himself. Osan says she is afraid Koharu will kill herself now that Jihei has left her. Jihei says they need 150 ryō in order to free Koharu from her contract. Osan takes 80 ryō from a secret stash and gives it to Jihei. She then takes all her clothing and tells Jihei to pawn it for the remaining 70 ryō. As Jihei is about to leave for the pawn shop, Gozaemon arrives and orders Jihei to write a letter of divorce from Osan. When Jihei refuses, Gozaemon drags Osan away from the shop. Osan resists and begs to stay but Jihei remains silent. Once she has left, Jihei breaks into tears and begins tearing apart the shop: throwing papers, pushing over furniture, and even pushing over walls, which collapse with ease.

Jihei finds Koharu back at the Kinokuni brothel, and the two run until they reach a graveyard where they make love. Afterwards, Koharu suggests Jihei kill her where they stand and then go to another location to kill himself. She thinks they shouldn't die together because Jihei is still married to Osan. Jihei cuts off his topknot, which he says makes him a priest, nullifying his marriage to Osan, and therefore he can die with Koharu. Likewise, Koharu then lets her hair down and declares herself a nun. They then hear the Daicho Temple bell, marking dawn. They venture into the wilderness where Jihei kills Koharu, pulls off her obi, and hangs himself with it with the help of kuroko on a lone torii on a hill. The final shot shows Jihei and Koharu laying opposite one another on a mat beneath the bridge as they were at the beginning of the film.

== Cast ==
Actor	Role
Kichiemon Nakamura	Jihei
Shima Iwashita	Koharu / Osan
Shizue Kawarazaki	Osan's Mother
Tokie Hidari	Osugi
Sumiko Hidaka	Proprietress
Yûsuke Takita	Magoemon
Hôsei Komatsu	Tahei
Takashi Sue	Store Owner
Masashi Makita	Guest
Makoto Akatsuka	Sangorô
Unko Uehara	Otama
Shinji Tsuchiya	Kantarô
Kaori Tozawa	Osue
Yoshi Katô	Gosaemon
Kamatari Fujiwara	Denbei

== Background ==
This play is often performed with puppets. In the film, the story is performed with live actors but makes use of Japanese theatrical traditions such as the kuroko (stagehands dressed entirely in black) who invisibly interact with the actors, and the set is non-realist. The kuroko prepare for a modern-day presentation of a puppet play while a voice-over, presumably the director, calls on the telephone to find a location for the penultimate scene of the lovers' suicide. Soon, human actors substitute for the puppets, and the action proceeds in a naturalistic fashion, until from time to time the kuroko intervene to accomplish scene shifts or heighten the dramatic intensity of the two lovers' resolve to be united in death. The stylized sets and the period costumes and props simultaneously convey a classical theatricality and contemporaneous modernity.

Jihei's fatal love interest, Koharu the prostitute, and his neglected wife, Osan, are both played by actress Shima Iwashita.

== Home media ==
This film was released on DVD in Japanese with English subtitles in Region 1 on 30 January 2001.
