= Sharaku (film) =

1995 film

- Film poster
- Directed by: Masahiro Shinoda
- Written by: Midori Katakura; Hiroko Minagawa; Masatoshi Sakai; Masahiro Shinoda
- Produced by: Masato Hara; Frankie Sakai
- Starring: Hiroyuki Sanada
- Cinematography: Tatsuo Suzuki
- Edited by: Hirohide Abe
- Music by: Tōru Takemitsu
- Release date: 4 February 1995 (Japan)
- Running time: 115 minutes
- Country: Japan
- Language: Japanese

Sharaku (Japanese: 写楽) is a 1995 Japanese drama film directed by Masahiro Shinoda. It was entered into the 1995 Cannes Film Festival.

== Cast ==
- Hiroyuki Sanada as Tonbo (Sharaku)
- Frankie Sakai as Tsutaya Jūzaburō
- Shima Iwashita as Troupe Leader
- Tsurutarō Kataoka as Goro (Jippensha Ikku)
- Shirō Sano as Utamaro
- Riona Hazuki as Hanasato
- Toshiya Nagasawa as Tetsuzo (the future Hokusai)
- Yasosuke Bando as Matsudaira Sadanobu
- Nakamura Tomijūrō V as Ichikawa Danjūrō V
- Haruko Kato as Ofuji
- Masumi Miyazaki as Gohi
- Choichiro Kawarazaki as Santō Kyōden
- Naomasa Musaka as Tsuruya Nanboku IV
- Takayoshi Takaba as Kurazo (Takizawa Bakin)
