= Gō Katō =

Japanese actor (1938–2018)

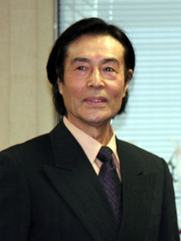
- November, 2007
- Born: 4 February 1938; Shizuoka, Japan
- Died: 18 June 2018 (aged 80)
- Occupation: Actor
- Years active: 1962–2018
- Spouse: Makiko Itō

Gō Katō (加藤剛, Katō Gō; 4 February 1938 – 18 June 2018) was a Japanese entertainer and actor.

Katō starred in the long-running TV series Ōoka Echizen (1970~2006).

== Overviews ==
The son of an elementary school principal, Katō studied literature and theatre. As an actor, he made his film debut in 1964. Katō rose in popularity through his role as Toshiro Mifune's son in Samurai Rebellion. He performed some of his most famous roles in films directed by Kei Kumai, such as The Long Darkness (1972), Cape of North (1976) and Death of a Tea Master (1989).

Katō played the lead role in two Taiga dramas, Kaze to Kumo to Niji to (1976) and Shishi no jidai (1980).

He died on 18 June 2018.

== Filmography ==
=== Film ===
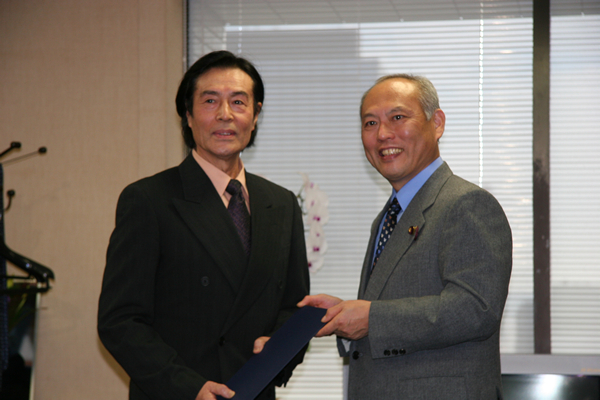
with Yōichi Masuzoe (at the Central Government Building No.5 in November 2007)

- A Legend or Was It? (1963) - Hideyuki Sonobe
- The Scent of Incense (1964) - Ezaki
- Sword of the Beast (1965) - Jurata Yamane
- Samurai Rebellion (1967) - Yogoro Sasahara
- Men and War Part I (1970) - Tatsuo Hattori
- Men and War Part II (1971) - Tatsuo Hattori
- Shinobu Kawa (1972) - Tetsuro
- Long Journey into Love (1973) - Yōzō
- Castle of Sand (1974) - Eiryo Waga
- Cape of North (1976) - Mitsuo
- Bandits vs. Samurai Squadron (1978) - Okubo Sadonokami
- Demon Pond (1979) - Akira Hagiwara
- Big Joys, Small Sorrows (1986) - Yoshiaki Fujita
- Death of a Tea Master (1989) - Oribe Furuta
- Bloom in the Moonlight (1993) - Yoshihiro Taki
- Anne no Nikki (1995) - Otto Frank
- The Unbroken (2009) - the Prime Minister Yasushi Tonegawa
- The Great Passage (2013) - Tomosuke Matsumoto
- Color Me True (2018) - old Kenji (his final role)

=== Television ===
- Kenkaku Shōbai (1973) - Akiyama Daijirō
- Ōoka Echizen (1970-1999) - Ōoka Tadasuke
- Kaze to Kumo to Niji to (1976) - Taira no Masakado
- Sekigahara (1981) - Ishida Mitsunari
- Sosa Kenji Ukon Makoto no Satsujin Chosho (June 10, 2000) - Makoto Ukon
- Sosa Kenji Ukon Makoto no Satsujin Chosho 2 (December 9, 2000) - Makoto Ukon
- Sosa Kenji Ukon Makoto no Satsujin Chosho 3 (2005) - Makoto Ukon
- Clouds Over the Hill (2009-2011) - Itō Hirobumi
- Yuriko-san no Ehon (2016) - Nobutsuna Sasaki
- Ōoka Echizen (2016) - Kazama Gorōzaemon

== Honours ==
- Medal with Purple Ribbon (2001)
- Order of the Rising Sun, 4th Class, Gold Rays with Rosette (2008)
