= Ōoka Echizen =

- Genre: Jidaigeki
- Country of origin: Japan
- No. of episodes: 402

Production
- Running time: 54 minutes
- Production company: C.A.L.

Original release
- Network: JNN (TBS)
- Release: March 16, 1970 – March 15, 1999

Ōoka Echizen (大岡越前) is a Japanese prime-time television jidaigeki series. From March 16, 1970 to March 15, 1999, 402 episodes and 15 seasons were broadcast. Also, a two-hour special aired on March 20, 2006, commemorating the fiftieth anniversary of the National Gekijō, which occupies the Monday evening 8:00–8:54 pm time slot on the TBS network, sponsored by Matsushita. It alternated, seasonally, with Mito Kōmon and Edo o Kiru.

The title character is Ōoka Tadasuke, a historical person who was a magistrate in the city of Edo (the forerunner of modern Tokyo) during the time of Tokugawa Yoshimune in the eighteenth century. The magistrate acted as chief of police, judge and jury. The show was a detective-courtroom program. Actor Gō Katō created the title character and played him throughout the life of the series.

Sōgen Asahina did the title calligraphy. Takeo Yamashita did the music. The series was produced by C.A.L. It has been widely rerun on terrestrial and pay satellite television in Japan. Some episodes available on DVD.

== Cast ==
Ōoka Family

- Gō Katō as Ōoka Tadasuke
- Chiezō Kataoka as Ōoka Tadataka, Tadasuke's father (Series 1-6)
- Haruko Katō as Ōoka Tae, Tadasuke's mother (Series 1-7)
- Masayo Utsunomiya as Yukie, Tadasuke's wife (Series 1-6)
- Wakako Sakai as Yukie (Series 7-8)
- Yoshie Taira as Yukie (Series 9-15)
- Tatsugorō Ōkawa as Ōoka Tadayoshi, Tadasuke's son (Series 3)

Other

- Yuji Hori as Yoshimura Sakuzaemon, Yukie's foster father (Series 1-2)
- Murasaki Fujima as Shizuka, Yukie's mother (Series 13-15)

Koishikawa Yōjōsho (the Koishikawa "city hospital") and other doctors

- Muga Takewaki as Iori Sakakibara
- Sanae Tsuchida as Chiharu, Genzo's daughter (Series 2-4)
- Mariko Mochizuki as Ine (Series 2-3)
- Takashi Shimura as Umino Donshū, Iori's mentor (Series 1 in Story 11, Series 2-3)
- Hideo Takamatsu as Itō Kōan (Series 4)
- Ayako Sawada as Ochiyo (Series 4)
- Kiyotaka Mitsugi as Bunkichi (Series 4)
- Izumi Yamaguchi as Takasaka Chie (Series 5)
- Fumihiko Fujima as Kudō Shingo (Series 5)
- Reiko Niwa as Ine (Series 6)
- Teruhiko Saigō as Shinzaburō (Series 6, 14-15)
- Kiyoshi Takai as Takagi (Series 8-15)
- Ritsuko Nemoto as Shiho (Series 9-14)
- Saori Yumiba as Kikue (Series 15)

Government

- Takashi Yamaguchi as Tokugawa Yoshimune
- Munemaru Kōda as Mizuno Izumi-no-kami (Series 11-12)
- Shinji Takano as Nakayama Izumo-no-kami (Series 12-14)

Officers and their family and assistants

- Yoriki at Minami-machi
  - Shigeru Amachi as Kamiyama Samon (Series 1-3)
  - Daijirō Harada as Ikeda Daisuke (Series 3)
  - Tomokazu Miura as Sagara Shunsuke (Series 4)
  - Tokuma Nishioka as Katahira Yaheiji (Series 12)
- Doushin at Minami-machi and their family
  - Shirō Ōsaka as Murakami Genjirō (Series 1-9)
  - Kakuko Motoyama as Mino, Genjiro's second wife (Series 4)
  - Kyōko Yoshizawa as Aya, Mino's daughter (Series 4)
  - Kōji Wada as Kazama Shunsuke (Series 5-9)
  - Kensaku Morita as Kaburagi Heisuke (Series 8-12)
  - Yūsuke Satō as Tachibana Kyōnosuke (Series 9-14)
  - Yūko Funakura as Chizuru, Kyōnosuke's elder sister (Series 9-14)
  - Asao Sano as Sahashi Magobē (Series 10-13)
  - Naomi Kawashima as Chinatsu, Magobei's daughter (Series 11)
  - Wataru Shihōdō as Kitakaze Shōgo (Series 10)
  - Keisuke Sano as Katase Kentarō (Series 11-15)
  - Daijirō Harada as Kakei Jinpachi (Series 12-13)
  - Masao Komatsu as Akagaki Denbē (Series 12-15)
  - Masaki Terasoma as Natsume jinpachi (Series 14-15)
  - Hideomi Shima as Kitajima Shunsuke (Series 15)
  - Eiko Ito as Shōko, Akagaki's wife (Series 15)
- Doushin's assistants
  - Gentarō Takahashi as Suttobi no Tatsu, Genjiro's assistant (Series 1-15)
  - Mariko Endō as Ohana, Tatsu's wife (Series 5-10)
  - Wakiko Kanō as Okei (Series 7-8)
  - Kan'ichi Tani as Kanta (Series 8-15)
  - Haruko Sagara as Okyō, Kanta's niece (Series 11)
  - Shigeru Inoue as Mogura no kyūsuke (Series 12)
  - Shidō Nakamura as Kokichi (Series 14)
  - Shun Ueda as Fusakichi (Series 15)
  - Jun'ichi Mizuno as Taichi (Series 15)
  - Masami Sonoda as Mizusumashi no Gengorō (Series 8-11)
- Doushin at Kita-machi
  - Mitsuru Satō as Togasaki Shinbei (Series 4)
  - Katsumasa Uchida as Kanzaki Gorouji (Series 5)

Secret Assistants (other than assistants working at Tanuki)

- Kyōko Enami as Oyō (Series 4)
- Izumi Ayukawa as Oren (Series 13)

Carpenters and Firefiters and their family

- Kōtarō Satomi as Masakichi (Series 1-3)
- Shinobu Tsuruta as Yakichi (Series 1)
- Takeya Nakamura as Tobi no Isaburō (Series 1-3)
- Eiko Takehara as Kayo (Series 2-3)

Servants in Ōoka Family's house

- Mariko Endō as Ohana, Tatsu's wife (Series 5-10)
- Miyuki Nishimura as Ochiyo (Series 10)
- Ai Yasunaga as Ohana (Series 11)
- Yūko Hanashima as Osuzu (Series 12-13)
- Hideomi Shima as Kitamura Ippei (Series 12-14)
- Tomoe Yoshii as Sumire (Series 13-15)

Diner Tanuki

Secret assistants

- Eitarō Matusyama as Mashira no Sanji (Series 1-4, 6-10)
- Seiji Matsuyama as Mashira no Sanji (Series 5)
- Maria Mori as Oryū (Series 10-13)
- Tonpei Hidari as Chōnome no Hanji (Season 12-15)
- Miyuki Nakano as Osuzu (Season 14)
- Mikisuke Katsura (4th) as Hayabusa no Rokusuke (Series 15)

Workers

- Miyako Tasaka as Ohana (Series 3)
- Mutsuko Sakura as Okin (Series 3)
- Shinobu Yūki as Ohana (Series 4)
- Chiyoe Sakaki as Otoki (Series 5)
- Misako Okada as Okimi (Series 6)
- Sota Ohashi as Tomekichi (Series 7)
- Ikuko Yamamoto as Oyumi (Series 8)
- Yuka Katayama as Ochiyo (Series 9)
- Miwa Sakagami as Oaki (Series 9)
- Yumi Katō as Oharu (Series 9)
- Kyōko Katsuragawa as Onatsu (Series 9)
- Yuri Kobayashi as Ofuyu (Series 9)
- Misa Shimizu as Shinobu (Series 10)
- Yasuko Takahashi as Otama (Series 10) ,Oume (Series 11-13),
- Keiko Un'no as Omatsu (Series 11)
- Mayuko Nakao as Otake (Series 11-13)
- Yuka Ayaki as Okimi (Series 13), Oaki (Series 14)
- Asuka Morinaga as Ohana (Series 15)
