= Florent Chavouet =

French graphic artist and illustrator

Florent Chavouet (born 11 February 1980) is a French illustrator and author best known for his graphic travelogues set in Japan. His work has received numerous literary and artistic awards, including the Prix Ptolémée (2009), the Prix Pierre Loti (2011), and the Fauve Polar SNCF prize at the Angoulême International Comics Festival (2015).

== Biography ==
Chavouet earned a master's degree in visual arts and began visiting Japan from 2004 onward.

== Career ==
=== Tokyo Sanpo (2009) ===
Published in 2009, by Éditions Philippe Picquier, this is a graphic travel memoir chronicling six months of everyday life in Tokyo through detailed colored-pencil sketches, personal notes, and hand-drawn neighborhood maps.

It won the Prix Ptolémée at the Festival International de Géographie in 2009. The book was translated into English as Tokyo on Foot (Tuttle, 2011) and received critical acclaim. Foreword Reviews praised it as “warm, whimsical, and rich in vignettes” and Halcyon Realms described it as “a delightful visual exploration of Tokyo’s neighborhoods.”

=== Manabé Shima (2010) ===
A travelogue chronicling a two-month residency on the Japanese island Manabeshima. Published in 2010 by Éditions Philippe Picquier, the book was part of the official selection at the 2011 Angoulême International Comics Festival and won the Prix Pierre Loti in 2011. Parka Blogs and Self Taught Japanese both noted the work's intimacy and observational humor.

=== Petites Coupures à Shioguni (2014) ===
A fictional noir graphic novel set in rural Japan, published on 20 November 2014 by Éditions Philippe Picquier. It was awarded the Fauve Polar SNCF at the 2015 Angoulême International Comics Festival, a fact confirmed by *Le Monde* in its reporting of that year's festival awards.

=== L'Île Louvre (2015) ===
Commissioned by the Louvre Museum, this drawn reportage explores the museum's space through a sketchbook format, published 5 November 2015 by Futuropolis / Musée du Louvre.

=== Touiller le miso (2020) ===
A haiku-style sketch-travelogue documenting a sake-themed journey across Japan, published 9 November 2020 by Editions Philippe Picquier. Pen Online described it as “poetic and precise.”

== Art style and themes ==
Chavouet's work is known for colored-pencil illustrations, isometric perspectives, and maps. His books blend personal narrative with humor and cultural detail.

== Exhibitions and commissions ==
- Solo exhibition "Là-bas vu d'ici" at Huberty & Breyne Gallery in Paris.
- Stamp illustrations for La Poste de France (2017).
- Christmas window displays for Galeries Lafayette (2022).
- In 2026, Chavouet's work was featured on the cover of the Beaux Arts Éditions special issue Quand le dessin raconte les mondes économiques, published in collaboration with Art Faber for the Drawing Now Paris fair.

== Reception ==
Asia by the Book described Tokyo on Foot as “a deeply personal account.” Japaneselit.net praised its cultural observations.

== Awards ==
- Prix Ptolémée, 2009
- Prix Pierre Loti, 2011
- Official Selection, Angoulême International Comics Festival, 2011
- Fauve Polar SNCF, 2015
