= Ballad of Orin =

- DVD cover
- Hanare Goze Orin (はなれ瞽女おりん)
- Directed by: Masahiro Shinoda
- Screenplay by: Keiji Hasebe; Masahiro Shinoda
- Produced by: Kiyoshi Nonomura
- Starring: Shima Iwashita; Yoshio Harada; Tomoko Naraoka
- Cinematography: Kazuo Miyagawa
- Edited by: Sachiko Yamaji
- Music by: Tōru Takemitsu
- Production company: Hyōgen-sha
- Distributed by: Toho
- Release date: November 19, 1977 (Japan)
- Running time: 118 minutes
- Country: Japan
- Language: Japanese

Ballad of Orin (Japanese: はなれ瞽女おりん, Hepburn: Hanare goze Orin) is a 1977 Japanese film directed by Masahiro Shinoda. Its alternate English-language titles are Banished Orin and Symphony in Gray.

It details the life of a goze, a blind female minstrel (played by Shima Iwashita, the director's wife), in early 20th-century Japan.

== Cast ==
- Shima Iwashita as Orin
- Yoshio Harada as Heitarō - Big Man
- Tomoko Naraoka as Teruyo
- Taiji Tonoyama as Charcoal Man
- Tōru Abe as Bessho
- Jun Hamamura as Saito

== Awards and nominations ==
2nd Hochi Film Award

- Won: Best Actress - Shima Iwashita
