= Tetsuya Fujita (actor) =

Japanese actor

- 藤田 哲也
- Born: March 19, 1978 (age 47); Saitama Prefecture, Japan
- Occupation: Actor

Tetsuya Fujita (藤田 哲也, Fujita Tetsuya; born March 19, 1978) is a Japanese actor.

== Filmography ==
=== Films ===
- Childhood Days (1990) - Shinji Kazama
- Fukuzawa Yukichi (1991)
- The River with No Bridge (1992) - Young Koji Hatanaka
- Anmonaito no sasayaki wo kiita (1992)
- Tōki Rakujitsu (1992) - Young Hideyo Noguchi
- Oshie to tabi suru otoko (1994)
- Noroime (2000)
- Drug (2001) - Kentaro Odajima
- Kusa no ran (2004) - Naekichi Ohno

=== Television drama ===
- O botchama ni hawa karumai! (1986)
- Nobunaga, King of Zipangu (1992) - teenager Oda Nobutada
- Fūrinkazan (1992) - Takeda Katsuyori
- Mito Kōmon - Jiro (episode 14, 1993), Kazuma Takeuchi (episode 39, 1995), Shinbei Ichihara (episode 12, 2005)
- HAMIDEKA - Makoto Otaki (episode 2, 1997)
- Abarenbō Shōgun VIII - Usaburō (episode 15, 1998)
- Hagure keiji junjō-ha (2000) - Kazuhiro Nakanishi
- Kochira dai san shakai-bu (2001) - Yoshitaka Saito
- Hagure keiji junjō-ha: Part 16 (2003) - Uehara (episode 15)
- Kochira Hon Ikegami Sho (2004) - Hayato Hayashi
- Hagure keiji junjō-ha (2004) - Yutaka Ogata

=== Dubbing ===
- The Goonies (1985) - Ricky One
- Oliver & Company (1988) - Oliver
