= Kasaoka Islands =

Group of islands in the Seto Inland Sea

Coordinates: 34°26′28″N 133°23′43″E

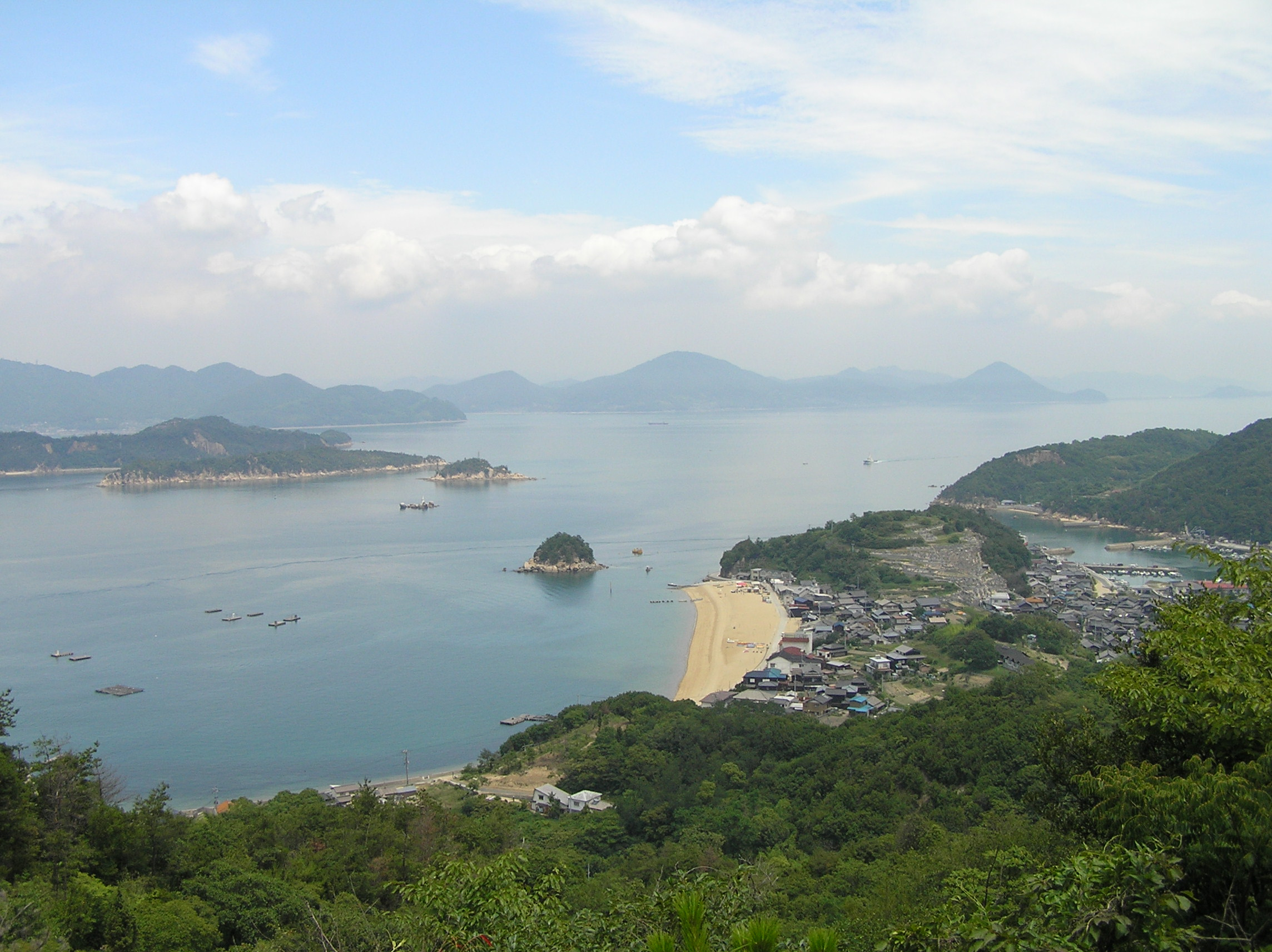
View from a hill of Shiraishi Island

The Kasaoka Islands (笠岡諸島, Kasaoka Shotō) are a group of 31 islands in the Seto Inland Sea of Okayama Prefecture. They are part of the city of Kasaoka.

The seven inhabited islands in the group are:

- Takashima Island 高島 (岡山県笠岡市)
- Shiraishi Island, 白石島
- Kitagi Island, 北木島
- Ōbi Island, 大飛島
- Kobi Island, 小飛島
- Manabeshima, 真鍋島
- Mushima Island, 六島
