= Assassination (1964 film) =

1964 film

- UK DVD Cover
- Directed by: Masahiro Shinoda
- Screenplay by: Nobuo Yamada
- Story by: Ryotaro Shiba
- Starring: Tetsuro Tamba; Shima Iwashita; Eitaro Ozawa
- Cinematography: Masao Kosugi
- Music by: Tōru Takemitsu
- Production company: Shochiku
- Release date: July 4, 1964 (Japan)
- Running time: 104 minutes
- Country: Japan

Assassination (Japanese: 暗殺, Hepburn: Ansatsu), also known as The Assassin, is a 1964 film directed by Masahiro Shinoda.

== Release ==
Assassination was released in Japan in 1964. The film was released in the United States on October 30, 1964, by Shochiku Films of America.

== Cast ==
- Tetsurō Tamba – Hachirô Kiyokawa
- Shima Iwashita – Oren
- Isao Kimura – Tadasaburô Sasaki
- Eiji Okada – Lord Matsudaira
- Eitaro Ozawa – Premier Itakura
- Takanobu Hozumi – Tetsutaro Yamaoka
- Junkichi Orimoto – Kamo Serizawa
- Yukio Ninagawa – Shôhei Imuta
- Muga Takewaki - Miyagawa
- Keiji Sada – Sakamoto Ryōma
