= Kasaoka =

Kasaoka 笠岡市
- City
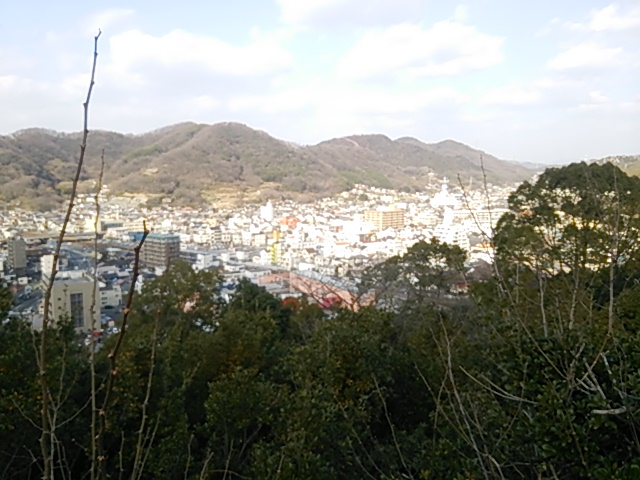
- View of Kasaoka City

- Flag Emblem
- Interactive map of Kasaoka
- Location in Japan
- Coordinates: 34°30′14″N 133°30′36″E
- Country: Japan
- Region: Chūgoku (San'yō)
- Prefecture: Okayama

Government
  - Mayor: Norimoto Mishima (current)

Area
  - Total: 136.24 km^{2} (52.60 sq mi)

Population (March 1, 2023)
  - Total: 45,404
  - Density: 333.26/km^{2} (863.15/sq mi)
- Time zone: UTC+09:00 (JST)
- City hall address: 1-1 Chūō, Kasaoka-shi, Okayama-ken 714-8601
- Climate: Cfa
- Symbols
- Flower: Chrysanthemum
- Tree: Ginkgo biloba

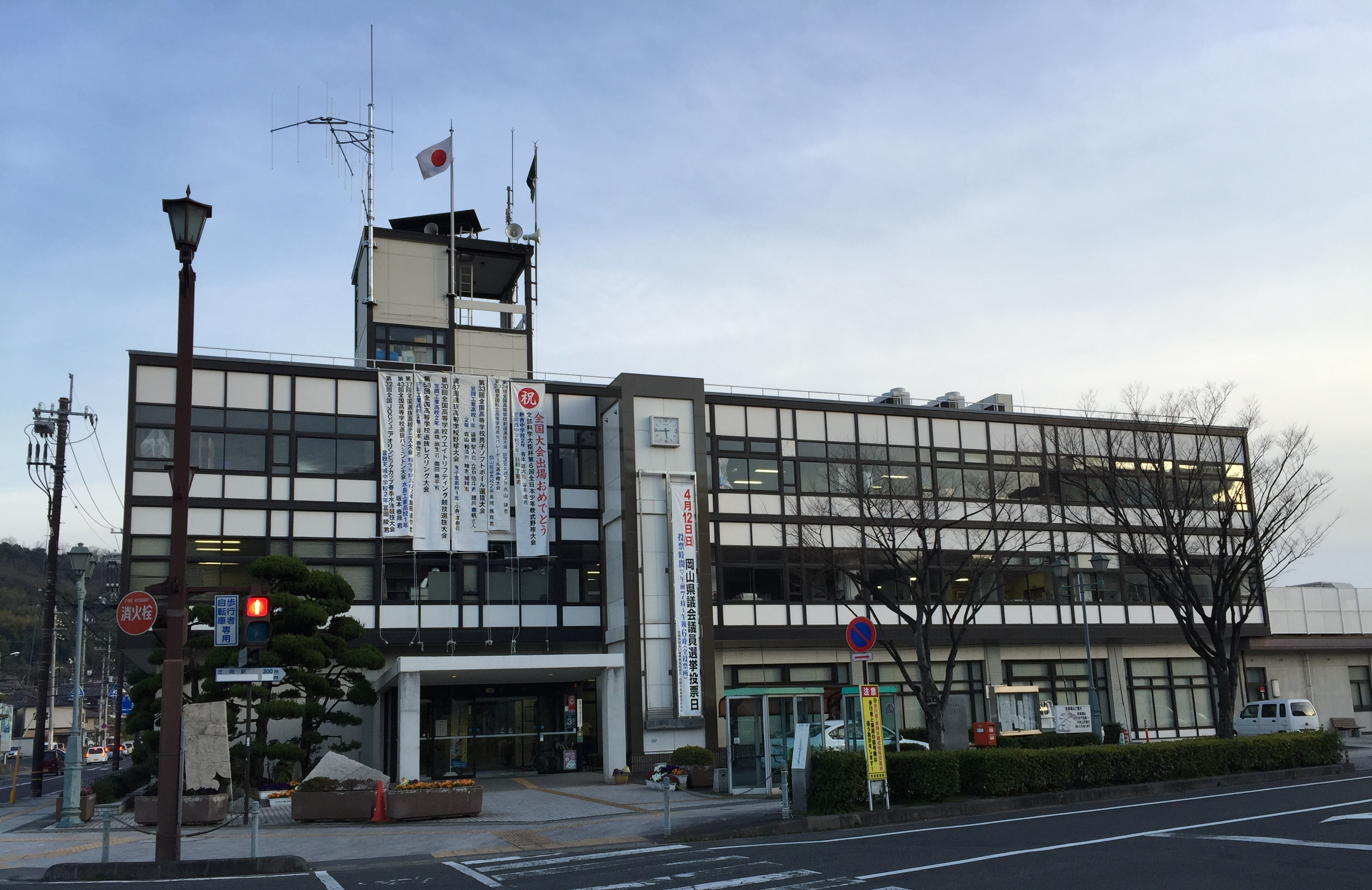
Kasaoka City Hall

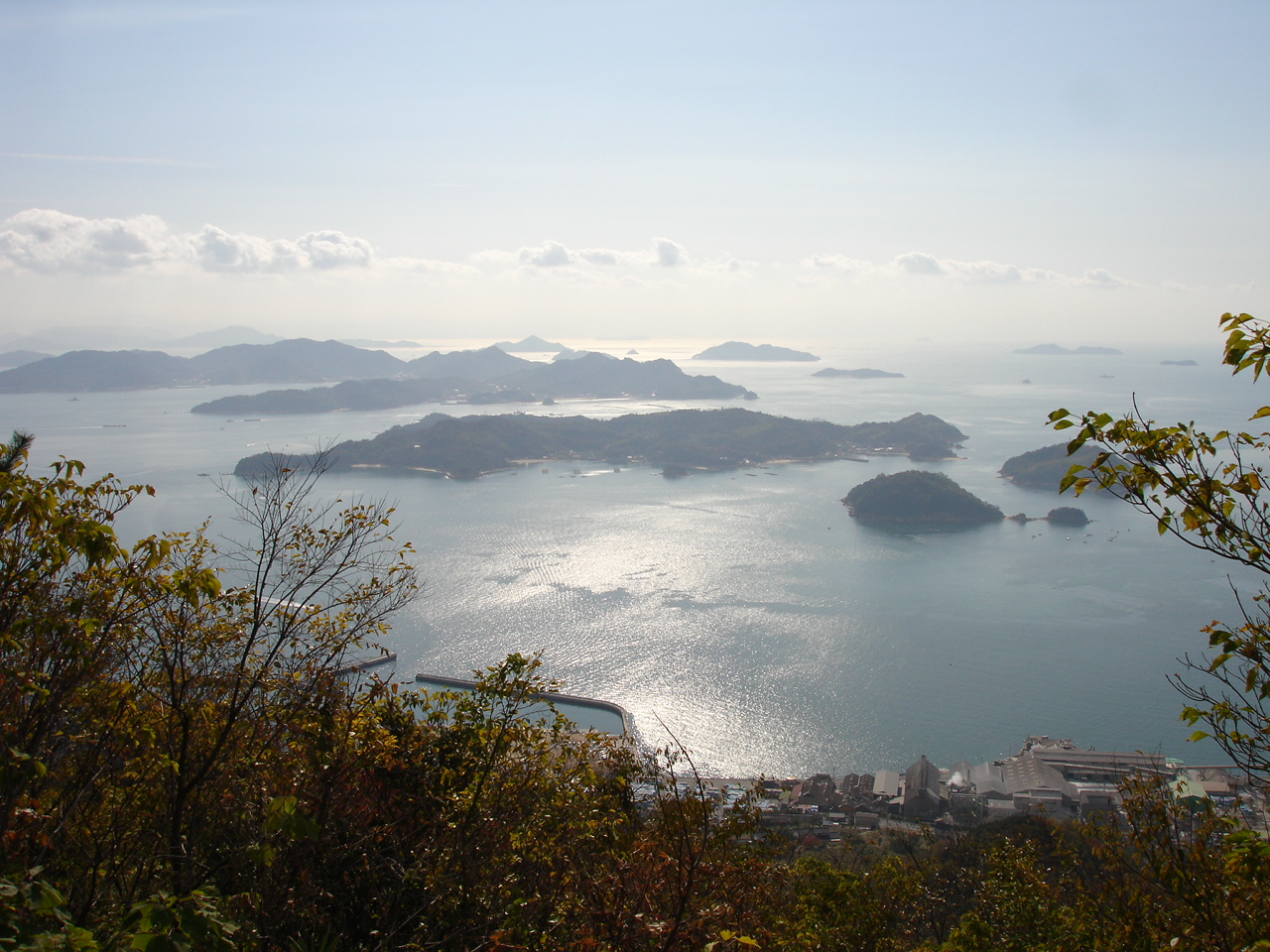
Kasaoka Islands

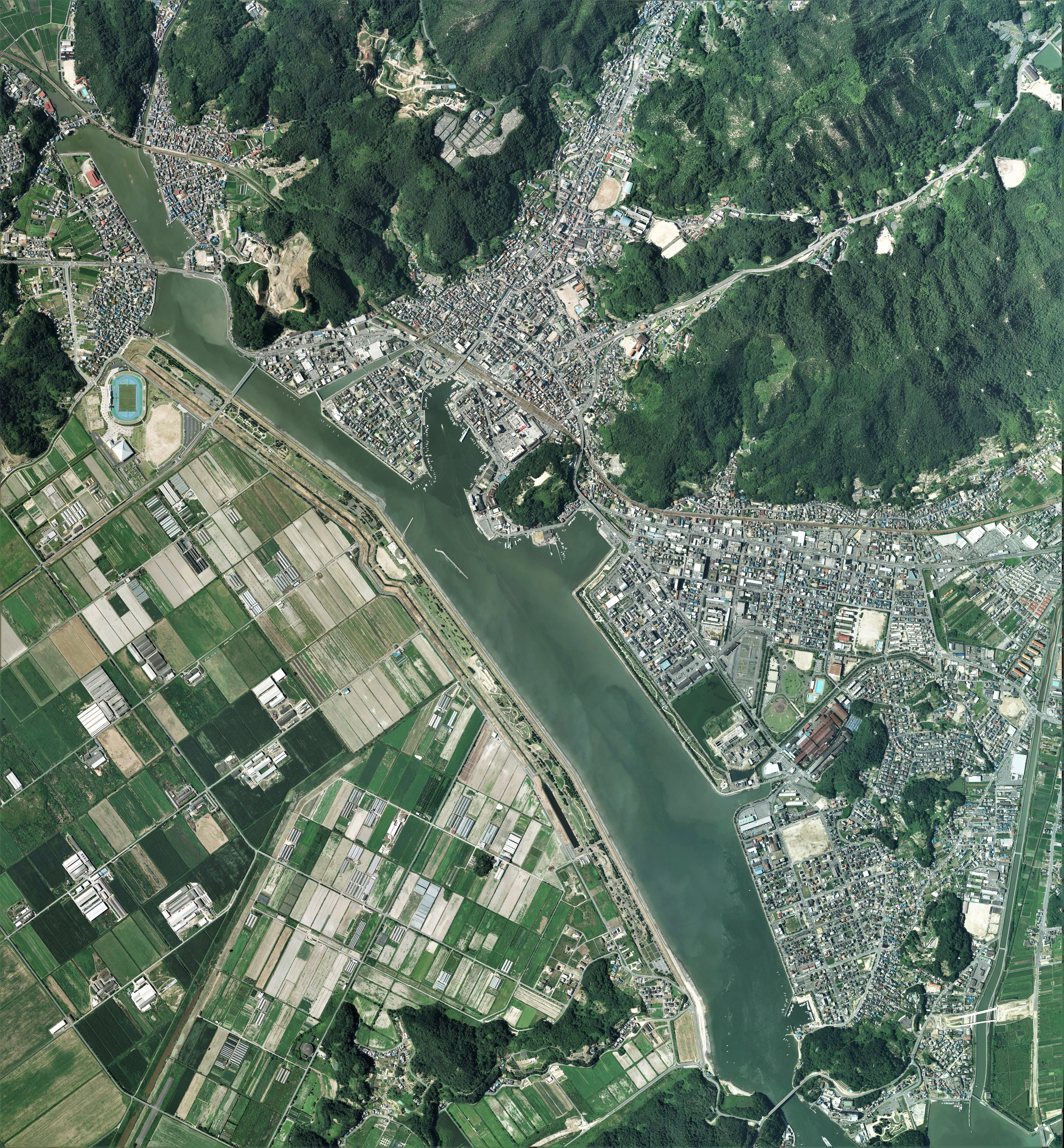
Aerial view of Kasaoka city center

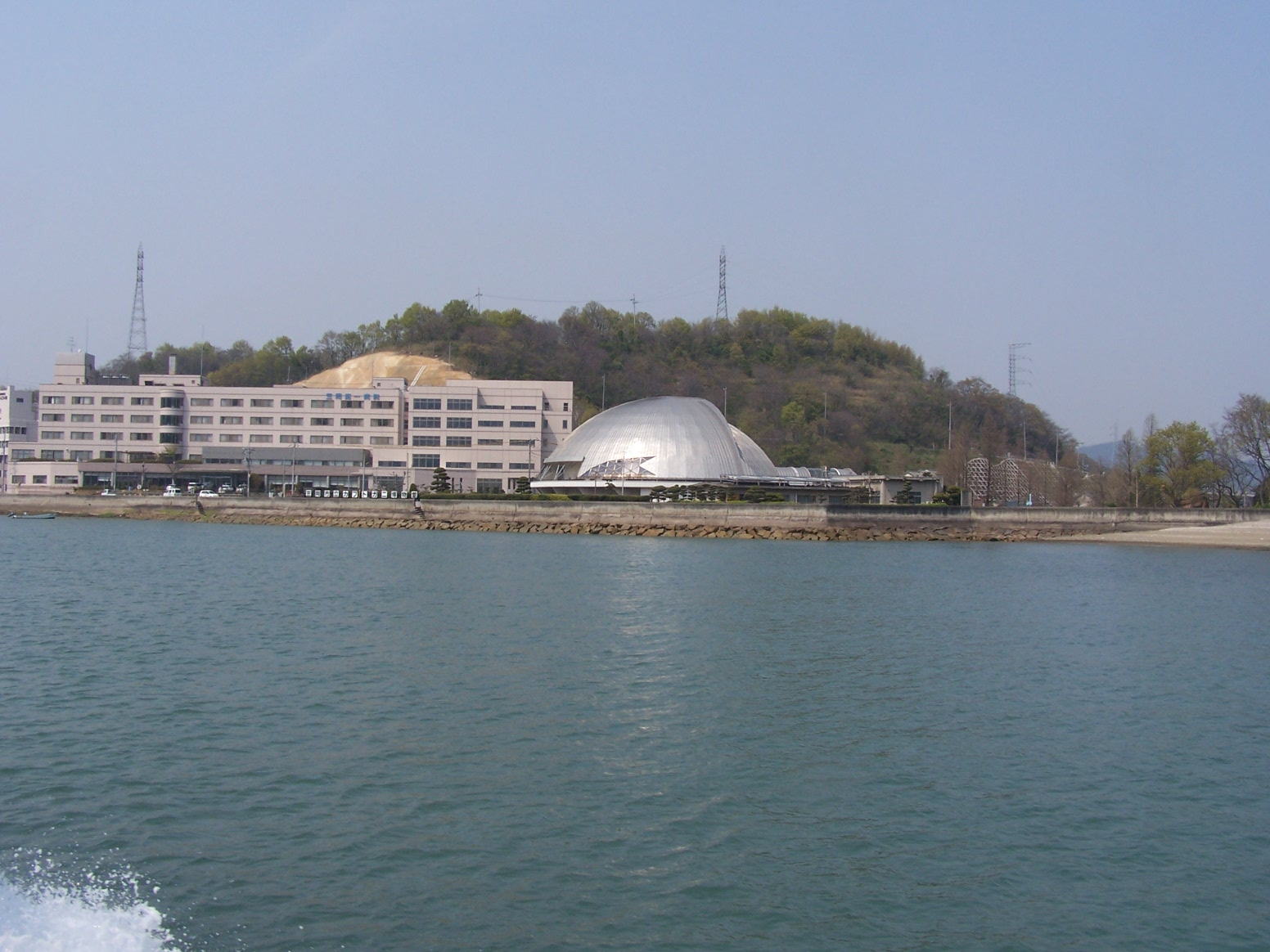
Kasaoka City Horseshoe Crab Museum

Kasaoka (笠岡市, Kasaoka-shi) is a city located in Okayama Prefecture, Japan. As of 1 March 2023, the city had an estimated population of 45,404 in 21,987 households and a population density of 330 inhabitants per square kilometre (850/sq mi). The total area of the city is 136.24 square kilometres (52.60 sq mi). The municipal district also includes 31 outlying islands including seven inhabited islands in the Kasaoka Islands archipelago in the Seto Inland Sea.

== Geography ==
Kasaoka is in the far southwestern corner of Okayama Prefecture, bordered by the Seto Inland Sea to the south and Hiroshima Prefecture to the west. It is mostly hilly and mountainous in the north, and consists of flat reclaimed land in the south. Urbanization is very diffuse, with the main urban concentration at the former port town of Kasaoka, with numerous hamlets scattered widely in narrow valley-shaped plains mostly in the central and northern areas. The tidal flats in the south are noted for endangered horseshoe crabs and the sea area between Kōnoshima and Nishi-Oshima has been designated as a national Natural Monument.

=== Adjoining municipalities ===
Hiroshima Prefecture

- Fukuyama

Okayama Prefecture

- Asakuchi
- Ibara
- Satoshō
- Yakage

=== Climate ===
Kasaoka has a humid subtropical climate (Köppen climate classification Cfa). The average annual temperature in Kasaoka is 15.7 °C (60.3 °F). The average annual rainfall is 1,055.1 mm (41.54 in) with July as the wettest month. The temperatures are highest on average in August, at around 28.0 °C (82.4 °F), and lowest in January, at around 4.5 °C (40.1 °F). The highest temperature ever recorded in Kasaoka was 38.0 °C (100.4 °F) on 5 August 2021; the coldest temperature ever recorded was −7.3 °C (18.9 °F) on 27 February 1981.

Climate data for Kasaoka (1991−2020 normals, extremes 1979−present)
Month	Jan	Feb	Mar	Apr	May	Jun	Jul	Aug	Sep	Oct	Nov	Dec	Year
Record high °C (°F)	16.5 (61.7)	21.7 (71.1)	25.0 (77.0)	28.5 (83.3)	32.2 (90.0)	34.7 (94.5)	38.0 (100.4)	38.0 (100.4)	37.6 (99.7)	31.9 (89.4)	26.7 (80.1)	20.0 (68.0)	38.0 (100.4)
Mean daily maximum °C (°F)	9.4 (48.9)	10.2 (50.4)	13.5 (56.3)	19.0 (66.2)	23.9 (75.0)	27.1 (80.8)	31.1 (88.0)	32.8 (91.0)	28.7 (83.7)	23.1 (73.6)	17.2 (63.0)	11.8 (53.2)	20.7 (69.2)
Daily mean °C (°F)	4.5 (40.1)	5.1 (41.2)	8.3 (46.9)	13.6 (56.5)	18.6 (65.5)	22.6 (72.7)	26.7 (80.1)	28.0 (82.4)	24.1 (75.4)	18.0 (64.4)	12.0 (53.6)	6.7 (44.1)	15.7 (60.2)
Mean daily minimum °C (°F)	0.0 (32.0)	0.3 (32.5)	3.1 (37.6)	8.2 (46.8)	13.5 (56.3)	18.7 (65.7)	23.2 (73.8)	24.2 (75.6)	20.1 (68.2)	13.5 (56.3)	7.3 (45.1)	2.2 (36.0)	11.2 (52.2)
Record low °C (°F)	−6.7 (19.9)	−7.3 (18.9)	−4.2 (24.4)	−1.7 (28.9)	3.6 (38.5)	10.4 (50.7)	15.8 (60.4)	16.7 (62.1)	9.1 (48.4)	2.5 (36.5)	−1.3 (29.7)	−4.3 (24.3)	−7.3 (18.9)
Average precipitation mm (inches)	33.0 (1.30)	41.6 (1.64)	76.6 (3.02)	81.2 (3.20)	102.7 (4.04)	160.7 (6.33)	172.9 (6.81)	80.0 (3.15)	129.2 (5.09)	87.5 (3.44)	50.2 (1.98)	39.6 (1.56)	1,055.1 (41.54)
Average precipitation days (≥ 1.0 mm)	4.7	6.5	8.7	8.5	8.7	10.5	9.4	6.9	8.3	6.9	5.8	5.6	90.5
Mean monthly sunshine hours	150.1	146.3	181.8	196.9	212.0	162.3	194.1	224.5	167.8	172.1	152.5	150.1	2,110.5
Source: Japan Meteorological Agency

=== Demographics ===
Per Japanese census data, the population of Kasaoka in 2020 is 46,088 people. Kasaoka has been conducting censuses since 1950.

Historical population
Year	Pop.	±%
1950	75,372	—
1955	73,552	−2.4%
1960	68,987	−6.2%
1965	63,778	−7.6%
1970	62,405	−2.2%
1975	63,413	+1.6%
1980	61,917	−2.4%
1985	60,598	−2.1%
1990	59,619	−1.6%
1995	60,478	+1.4%
2000	59,300	−1.9%
2005	57,272	−3.4%
2010	54,256	−5.3%
2015	50,568	−6.8%
2020	46,088	−8.9%
Kasaoka population statistics

== History ==
The Kasaoka area is part of ancient Bitchū Province and numerous shell middens from the Jōmon period confirm that the area has been inhabited since prehistoric times. The place name 'Kasaoka' is said to have been derived from the area of influence of the 'Kasaomi clan' of the ancient Kingdom of Kibi. Kasaoka Castle, was built by Murakami Takashige at the end of the Muromachi period and was controlled by the Mōri clan during the Sengoku period. Under the Edo Period Tokugawa shogunate, the area became part of the territory of the Mizuno clan of Fukuyama Domain. The Mizuno invested vast sums of money in civil engineering projects to promote the development of new rice fields in Kasaoka, which originally had little flat land. However, the domain fell to attainder in the middle of the Edo period, and the Kasaoka area was ruled as tenryō territory about 170 years until the end of the Edo period.

Following the Meiji restoration, the village of Kasaoka was established within Oda District, Okayama with the creation of the modern municipalities system on June 1, 1889. It was raised to town status on October 23, 1891 and to city status on April 1, 1952. Due to its strong historical, cultural and economic ties with Fukuyama, proposals have been made for a merger between the two municipalities.

== Government ==
Kasaoka has a mayor-council form of government with a directly elected mayor and a unicameral city council of 17 members. Kasaoka contributes two members to the Okayama Prefectural Assembly. In terms of national politics, the city is part of the Okayama 3rd district of the lower house of the Diet of Japan.

== Economy ==
Kasaoka is located in the Seto Inland Sea Industrial Belt and together with neighboring Fukuyama was designated in 1964 as the "Bingo District Special Industrial Development Area". The city has a high concentration of heavy industry, notably related to JFE Steel, a major producer of crude steel in Japan. Agriculture, food processing are also major contributors to the local economy, although the traditional industries stone quarrying and production of pyrethrum are in decline due to competition from foreign sources. The city is also increasing a commuter town for neighboring Fukuyama and Kurashiki.

== Education ==
Kasaoka has 18 public elementary schools and nine public junior high schools operated by the city government and one private junior high school. The city has four public high schools operated by the Okayama prefectural Board of Education. The prefecture also operates one special education school for the disabled.

== Transportation ==
=== Railway ===
JR West (JR West) - San'yō Main Line

- Kasaoka

=== Highways ===
- San'yō Expressway
- National Route 2

== Sister cities ==
Kasaoka is twinned with:

- Astoria, Oregon, United States
- Goseong County, South Korea
- Kota Bharu, Kelantan, Malaysia
- Mörbylånga, Sweden
- Ōda, Shimane, Japan

== Landmarks and local cultural facilities ==
- Kasaoka is the location of a protected horseshoe crab breeding habitat and the city features a Horseshoe Crab Museum.
- Chikkyo Art Museum
- Tsukumo Shell Mound, National Historic Site
- In culinary terms, Kasaoka city is known for its abundance of sea food and a local specialty of chicken based ramen.

== Crime and safety ==
The Asano-gumi yakuza syndicate is based in Kasaoka. The Asano-gumi is the only designated yakuza group based in Okayama Prefecture.
