= Shima Iwashita =

Japanese actress (born 1941)

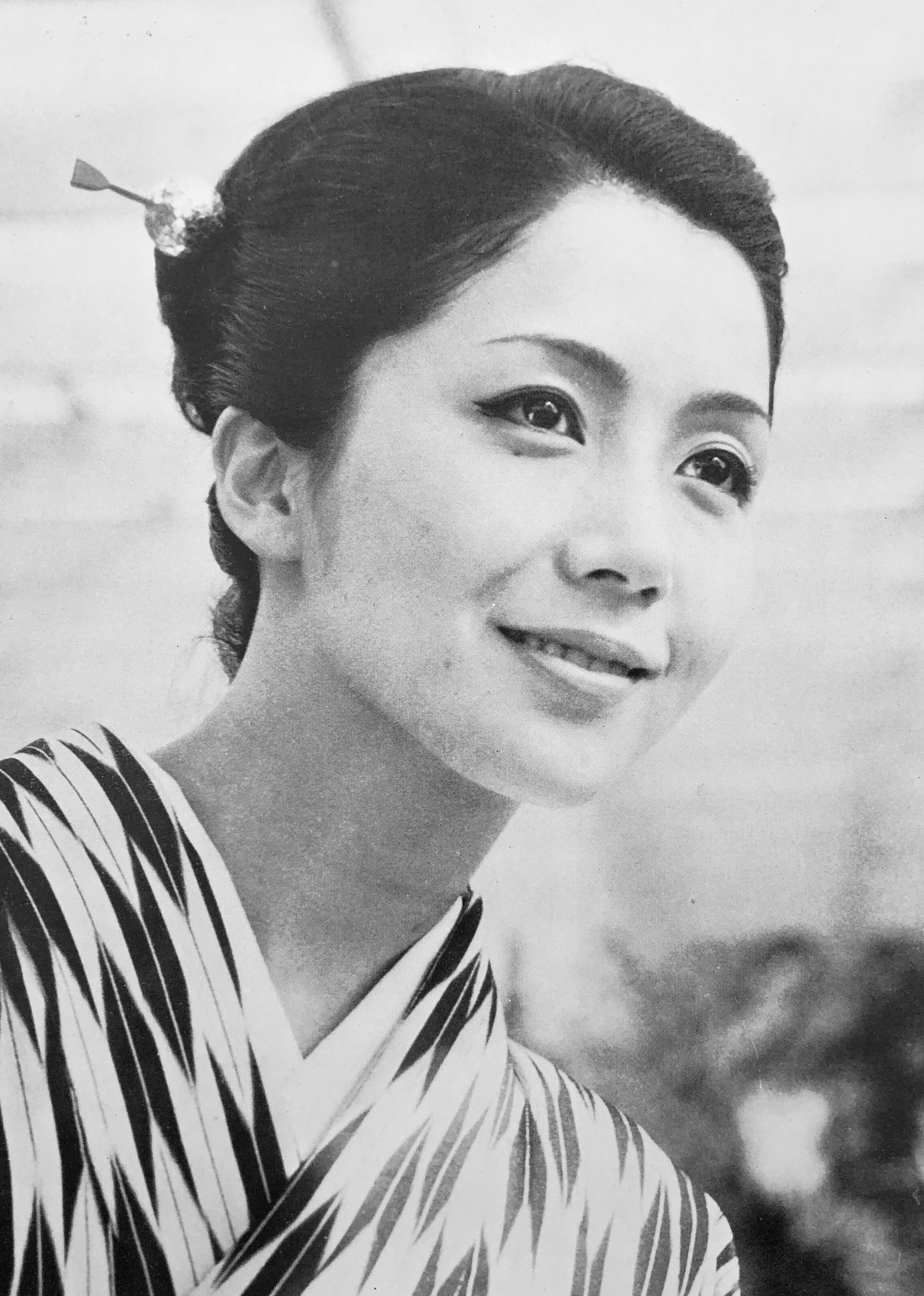
- Iwashita in the April 1965 edition of Eiga Jōhō
- Born: 3 January 1941 (age 85); Ginza, Tokyo, Japan
- Occupation: Actress
- Years active: 1958–present
- Spouse: Masahiro Shinoda (m. 1967; died 2025)

Shima Iwashita (Japanese: 岩下志麻, Hepburn: Iwashita Shima; born 3 January 1941) is a Japanese stage and film actress who has appeared in films of Yasujirō Ozu, Keisuke Kinoshita, Masaki Kobayashi and most frequently of Masahiro Shinoda, her husband. She is best known for starring in the Yakuza Wives series of yakuza films between 1986 and 1998. In 2000, Iwashita ranked tenth on Kinema Junpo's readers' poll of the top female movie stars of the 20th century. In 2025, she was ranked fourth in a poll conducted by Sankei Shimbun on the top actresses of the Shōwa era.

== Biography ==
Iwashita was born in Tokyo, Japan, as the eldest daughter of Kiyoshi Nonomura and Miyoko Yamagishi, both stage actors. In 1958, while still attending high school, she made her first television appearance in the NHK series Basu Tōri Ura. The following year, she entered the literature department of Seijo University, which she left without a degree. She joined the Shochiku film studio the same year (1960) and gave her debut in Keisuke Kinoshita's The River Fuefuki, but due to the film's long production time, it was her next film, Masahiro Shinoda's Dry Lake, which was released first. In 1961, she received the Blue Ribbon Newcomer Award.

Iwashita subsequently appeared in Yasujirō Ozu's last film, An Autumn Afternoon, Masaki Kobayashi's Harakiri (both 1962), Noboru Nakamura's Twin Sisters of Kyoto (1963), in which she played a dual role, and many films by her husband Masahiro Shinoda like Assassination (1964) and Double Suicide (1969), in which she again played a dual role. Also in 1969, she appeared on stage in the role of Desdemona in Othello.

Iwashita is best known for starring in the Yakuza Wives series of female-led yakuza films, which are based on a book of interviews with the wives and girlfriends of real gangsters. Beginning with the first installment in 1986, she appeared in eight of the ten theatrical films, ending with 1998's Yakuza Wives: Decision.

In addition to her film work, she kept appearing on television and on stage, receiving numerous awards like the Blue Ribbon Award, the Kinema Junpo Award and the Mainichi Award for Best Actress.

== Filmography (selected) ==
=== Film ===
Year	Film	Role	Notes	Ref.
1960	Dry Lake			
1960	The River Fuefuki	Ume		
1960	Late Autumn	woman at reception desk		
1961	Enraptured			
1962	Harakiri	Miho Tsugumo		
1962	An Autumn Afternoon	Michiko Hirayama		
1963	Twin Sisters of Kyoto	Chieko / Naeko	Lead role	
1963	A Legend or Was It?	Koeko Sonobe	Lead role	
1964	Assassination	Oren		
1965	Sword of the Beast	Taka		
1966	The Kii River			
1967	Portrait of Chieko	Chieko Takamura	Lead role	
1969	Double Suicide	Koharu / Osan		
1969	Red Lion	Tomi		
1971	Silence	Kiku		
1974	Himiko	Himiko	Lead role	
1977	Ballad of Orin	Orin	Lead role	
1978	The Demon	Oume	Lead role	
1978	Bandits vs. Samurai Squadron	Chiyo		
1982	Suspicion	Ritsuko Sahara	Lead role	
1982	Onimasa	Uta Kiryuin		
1984	MacArthur's Children	Tome		
1984	Fireflies in the North	Yu Nakamura		
1985	The Empty Table	Kiwa Nakahara		
1986	Gonza the Spearman	Osai		
1986	Yakuza Wives	Tamaki Awazu	Lead role	
1990	Childhood Days	Shizue Kazama		
1993	Kozure Ōkami: Sono Chiisaki Te ni	Oharu		
1995	Sharaku	Troupe Leader		
1997	Moonlight Serenade	Fuji		
1999	Owls' Castle	Kita no Mandokoro		
2003	Spy Sorge	Mrs. Konoe		

=== Television ===
Year	Title	Role	Notes	Ref.
1979	Kusa Moeru	Hōjō Masako	Lead role; Taiga drama	
1983	The Women of Osaka Castle	Yodo-dono	Lead role; television film	
1987	Dokuganryū Masamune	Yoshihime	Taiga drama	
2000	Aoi	Ogō	Taiga drama	

== Awards and honours (selected) ==
- 1961: Blue Ribbon Newcomer Award
- 1969–70: Mainichi Film Award and Kinema Junpo Award for Best Actress for Double Suicide
- 1977–78: Blue Ribbon Award, Mainichi Film Award and Kinema Junpo Award for Best Actress in Ballad of Orin
- 1988: Kinuyo Tanaka Award (1988)
- 2004: Medal with Purple Ribbon
- 2012: Order of the Rising Sun, 4th Class, Gold Rays with Rosette
