= Taeko Tomioka =

Japanese writer (1935–2023)

Taeko Tomioka (富岡 多恵子, Tomioka Taeko; July 28, 1935 – April 6, 2023) was a Japanese writer.

She was born in Osaka, was educated at Osaka Women's College, worked as a high school English teacher and moved to Tokyo in 1960. Tomioka visited New York City in 1964 and returned home to Japan in 1966. In 1969, she married Suga Kishio.

Tomioka published several collections of poems. Henrei (1958) won the Mr. H Prize (H-shi Shō), awarded by the Association of Contemporary Japanese Poets. Monogatari no akuru hi (1961) received the 'Muro Saisei Prize. Tomioka also wrote a poetical drama Matsuri (1959) and a screenplay Shinju ten no Amijima (Double suicide, 1968).

In 1971, she published the novel Oka ni mukatte hito wa narabu (Facing the Hills they stand). In 1974, Tomioka wrote Shokubutsu sai, which received the Tamura Toshiko Prize. In 1974, she published Meido no kazoku (Family in hell), which received the Women's Literature Prize. Her 1983 novel Namiutsu tochi was published in English as Building Waves (2012: ISBN 9781564787156).

Tomioka also translated some English works by authors such as Gertrude Stein into Japanese. She has also produced essays on literature from a feminist viewpoint.

In 1993, she published Nobuyoshi Araki: Akt-Tokyo, 1971-1991, a book of erotic photography. In 1997, Tomioka wrote Hiberunia kikō (A journey to Ireland), which received the Noma Literary Prize.

In 2000, The Funeral of a Giraffe: Seven Stories, a collection of her stories translated from Japanese to English, was published.

Tomioka died on April 6, 2023, at the age of 87.
