= Kazuo Kitamura =

Japanese actor (1927–2007)

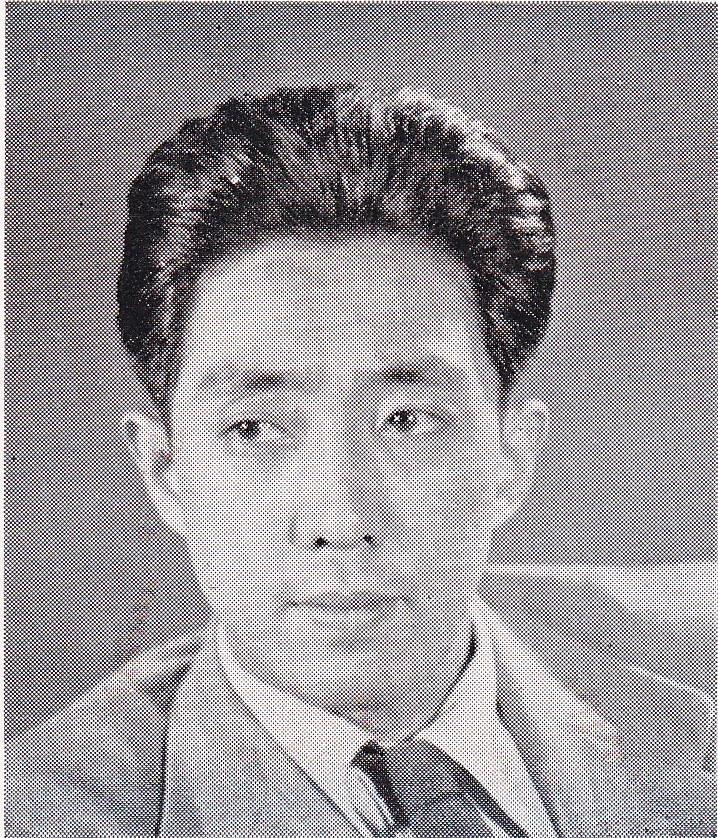
- Kitamura in 1954
- Born: 11 March 1927; Tokyo, Japan
- Died: 6 May 2007 (aged 80)
- Occupation: Actor
- Years active: 1950–2007

Kazuo Kitamura (北村 和夫, Kitamura Kazuo; 11 March 1927 – 6 May 2007) was a Japanese actor. His son is actor Yukiya Kitamura. Kitamura met Shōhei Imamura when he was a student of Waseda University and became a close friend so often worked with Imamura. Kitamura joined Bungakuza theatre company and started his acting career in 1950. In 1953, he made his film debut with An Inlet of Muddy Water directed by Tadashi Imai.

== Filmography ==
=== Film ===
- An Inlet of Muddy Water (1953) as Rickshaw man
- Anyakôro (1959) as Takai
- Yoru no nagare (1960)
- The Human Condition III: A Soldier's Prayer (1961) as Kitagô Sôchô
- Till Tomorrow Comes (1962)
- Wakai hito (1962) as Kenkichi Eguchi
- High and Low (1963) as Third journalist
- The Insect Woman (1963) as Chuji Matsuki
- Yearning (1964) as Morizono
- Kaze no Bushi (1964) as Yôroku Nabari
- Otoko girai (1964) as Kingo Ashida
- Nihiki no mesu inu (1964) as Aoyama
- The Scent of Incense (1964) as Keisuke
- Unholy Desire (1964) as Seiichiro Takahashi
- Akujo (1964) as Kamekichi Enjo
- Ryojin nikki (1964) as Kentaro Hatanaka - a lawyer
- Kwaidan (1965) as Taira no Tomomori (segment "Miminashi Hôichi no hanashi")
- Himo (1965) as Akiko's husband
- Hiya-meshi to Osan to Chan (1965) as Shinsuke (episode 3)
- A Chain of Islands (1965) as Narrator (voice)
- Zettai tasu (1965)
- Tobo (1965)
- Honkon no shiroibara (1965) as Hiroshi Aoki
- House of Terrors (Kaidan semushi otoko, 1965) as Dr. Keisuke Munakata the Uncle of Yoshie
- The Pornographers (1966) as Doctor
- Danryû (1966) as Dr. Hashizume
- Eiko eno chôsen (1966)
- Japan's Longest Day (1967) as Tomoo Sato - Cabinet General Affairs Section Chief
- Bakuha 3-byô mae (1967) as Sugiyama
- Honô to onna (1967) as Fujikida
- Dai akutô (1968) as Prosecutor Okano
- Neon taiheiki (1968)
- Nippon gerira jidai (1968) as Director of Beheiron
- Profound Desires of the Gods (1968) as Doctor Kariya
- Yami o saku ippatsu (1968)
- A Woman and the Beancurd Soup (1968)
- Jotai (1969) as Lawyer
- Showa onna jingi (1969)
- Hitorikko (1969)
- The Militarists (1970) as Yamanaka (uncredited)
- Tora! Tora! Tora! (1970) as Foreign Minister Yosuke Matsuoka
- Kigeki Ijiwaru Daishôgai (1971)
- Saredowareraga bibi yori wakarenôta (1971)
- Summer Soldiers (1972) as Tachikawa
- Koi no natsu (1972)
- Aa koe naki tomo (1972) as Momose
- Fureai (1974)
- Kinkanshoku (1975)
- Inubue (1978) as Ishii Design section manager
- Never Give Up (1978) as Hikawa
- Mitsuyaku: Gaimushô kimitsu rôei jiken (1978) as Taichi ishiyama
- Taro the Dragon Boy (1979) as Niwatori-chouja (voice)
- Vengeance Is Mine (1979) as Deike
- Honjitsu tadaima tanjô (1979)
- White Love (1979) as Yoichiro Yamashita
- Taiyō o Nusunda Otoko (1979) as Tanaka
- Nippon keishichô no haji to iwareta futari: keiji chindôchû (1980)
- Eijanaika (1981) as Koide Yamato no Kami
- Sailor Suit and Machine Gun (1981) as Hamaguchi
- Aladdin and the Wonderful Lamp (1982) as Rampu no mamono (voice)
- Maboroshi no mizuumi (1982) as Onishi
- Kaikyô (1982)
- The Geisha (1983) as Yamaoka
- Katayoku dake no tenshi (1986)
- Guriin rekuiemu (1988) as Ryosuke Misawa
- Kanashii iro yanen (1988) as Daisuke
- Black Rain (1989) as Shigematsu Shizuma
- Yume no matsuri (1989) as Doctor
- Shaso (1989) as Ueno
- A-Ge-Man: Tales of a Golden Geisha (1990) as Tsurumaru
- Kagerô (1991) as Kosugi
- Gokudo no onna-tachi: Kiken na kake (1996) as Takuma Sado
- Tsuribaka nisshi 9 (1997)
- Nodo jiman (1999) as Kôtarô
- Nippon no kuroi natsu - Enzai (2001) as Takeo Nagata
- Warm Water Under a Red Bridge (2001) as Taro
- 11'09"01 September 11 (2002) as Village Mayor (segment: Japan)
- Shinobi: Heart Under Blade (2005) as Tokugawa Ieyasu
- Henshin (2005) as Hidetaka Doumoto
- Metasequoia no ki no shita de (2005) as Dr. Tsukada
- Goya-champuru (2006) as Taizo Suzuki
- Sinking of Japan (2006) as Minister of Justice
- Futô fukutsu (2007)
- Beauty (2008) as Inaji (final film role)

=== Television ===
- Taikōki (1965) as Torii Suneemon
- Ten to Chi to (1969) as Murakami Yoshikiyo
- Haru no Sakamichi (1971) as Shima Sakon
- Akō Rōshi (1979) as Ono Kurobei
- Tokugawa Ieyasu (1983) as Mizuno Tadamasa
- Oshin (1983) as Tabokura Daigorō
- Aoi (2000) as Maeda Toshiie
- Churasan (2001) as Daishin Shimada

=== Voice acting ===
- Lawrence of Arabia (1978 Nippon TV edition) – Auda Abu Tayi (Anthony Quinn)

== Honours ==
- Medal with Purple Ribbon (1989)
- Order of the Rising Sun, 4th Class, Gold Rays with Rosette (1997)
