= Kunoichi Keshō =

- DVD cover
- Directed by: Sadao Nakajima
- Screenplay by: Sō Kuramoto; Sadao Nakajima
- Based on: Kunoichi Keshō by Futaro Yamada
- Starring: Shigeru Tsuyuguchi; Kō Nishimura; Masumi Harukawa; Shoichi Ozawa; Takeshi Kato; Mako Midori; Yuriko Mishima; Jun Tatara; Gannosuke Ashiya
- Music by: Naozumi Yamamoto
- Distributed by: Toei Company
- Release date: December 12, 1964 (Japan)
- Running time: 90 minutes
- Country: Japan
- Language: Japanese

Kunoichi Keshō (Japanese: くノ一化粧), also known as The Spying Sorceress is a 1964 Japanese comedy jidaigeki film directed by Sadao Nakajima. Nakajima himself did the casting and Shigeru Tsuyuguchi, Kō Nishimura and Masumi Harukawa were cast from Shohei Imamura's film Unholy Desire because he was impressed with the film. It is based on Futaro Yamada's novel of the same title and is the second in Toei's Kunoichi film series based on Yamada's works.

== Plot ==
The plan to overthrow the Tokugawa Shogunate, led by Yui Shōsetsu and Marubashi Chūya, failed. Matsudaira Nobutsuna sensed the movement of Yui Shōsetsu and had Hattori Hanzo search for the funding source. As a result, Matsudaira Nobutsuna learned that the billions of treasure left by the Toyotomi clan had been hidden. He sends Amakusa Senchiyo and his subordinate to Nagasaki to find the treasure.

== Cast ==
- Shigeru Tsuyuguchi as Amakusa Senchiyo
- Kō Nishimura as Shinobu
- Masumi Harukawa as Kyara
- Shoichi Ozawa as Kyonen Mahiru
- Takeshi Kato as Hyakusai Mizuami
- Mako Midori as Oshino
- Yuriko Mishima as Osada
- Jun Tatara as Hattori Hanzo
- Gannosuke Ashiya as Kurama Izayoi

== See also ==
- Kunoichi Ninpō - first in Kunoichi film series. Also directed by Sadao Nakajima.
- Ninpō-chūshingura - third in Kunoichi film series. Directed by Yasuto Hasegawa.
