= Ninpō-chūshingura =

1965 Japanese film

Ninpō-chushingura
- Film poster
- Directed by: Yasuto Hasegawa
- Screenplay by: Tai Kato; Koji Takada
- Based on: Ninpō-chushingura by Futaro Yamada
- Produced by: Koichiro Ogura
- Starring: Tetsuro Tamba; Ko Nishimura; Akiji Kobayashi
- Music by: Toshiaki Tsushima
- Distributed by: Toei Company
- Release date: February 25, 1965 (Japan)
- Running time: 83 minutes
- Country: Japan
- Language: Japanese

Ninpō-chūshingura (Japanese: 忍法忠臣蔵), also known as Tale of Ninja Duty, is a 1965 Japanese erotic jidaigeki film directed by Yasuto Hasegawa. The film deals with the revenge of the forty-seven rōnin. It is based on Futaro Yamada's novel of the same name. It is the third in Toei's Kunoichi film series based on Yamada's works. The president of Toei company Shigeru Okada asked Sadao Nakajima, who directed past two Kunoichi films, to direct the film but he declined the offer.

== Plot ==
Mumyō Kotarō killed his betrayed fiancé Orie and He flees to Utsunomiya. On his way he happens to saves Chisaka Hyōbu's daughter Oyu(She is exactly like Orie.) be attacked by ninja. Thus he stays Chisaka's residence in Yonezawa. Chisaka was just trying to stop Forty-seven rōnin's revenge against Kira Kōzuke no suke by female ninja's sexual entrapment. Chisaka asks Kotarō to lead female ninja. Kotarō accepts the request on condition of marriage to Oyu.

== Cast ==
- Tetsurō Tamba as Mumyō Kotarō
- Kō Nishimura as Chisaka Hyōbu
- Hiroko Sakuramachi as Oyu/Orie
- Tsuyako Okajima
- Akiji Kobayashi as Horibe Yasubei
- Seizo Fukumoto as Namiuchi Dainoshin
- Yuriko Mishima as Oyumi
- Kazuko Oura as Toyo
- Daisuke Awaji as Mononose Tsukinori
- Yoshihiro Igarashi as Uesugi Tsununori
- Daizen Shishido as Shiraito
- Kunie Tanaka as Fuwa Kazuemon
- Minoru Ōki as Ōishi Kuranosuke

== See also ==
- Kunoichi Ninpō - first in Kunoichi film series. Directed by Sadao Nakajima.
- Kunoichi Keshō - second in Kunoichi film series. Directed by Sadao Nakajima.
