= Unholy Desire =

Unholy Desire / Intentions of Murder
- DVD cover to Unholy Desire
- Directed by: Shōhei Imamura
- Written by: Keiji Hasebe; Shōhei Imamura; Shinji Fujiwara (novel)
- Starring: Masumi Harukawa; Kō Nishimura; Shigeru Tsuyuguchi; Yūko Kusunoki
- Cinematography: Shinsaku Himeda
- Edited by: Mutsuo Tanji
- Music by: Toshirō Mayuzumi
- Production company: Nikkatsu
- Distributed by: Nikkatsu
- Release date: 28 June 1964 (Japan)
- Running time: 150 minutes
- Country: Japan

Unholy Desire a.k.a. Intentions of Murder (赤い殺意, Akai Satsui; lit. "Red Murderous Intent") is a 1964 Japanese drama film by director Shōhei Imamura.

== Plot ==
Sadako, a young woman, lives with her common-law husband Koichi, a librarian who has an ongoing affair with his colleague Yoshiko. Although she looks after Koichi's little son from a previous marriage like a real mother, his family picks on her and denies her being written into the family register. While her husband is away, Sadako is raped by a burglar, Hiraoka, who needs money for his heart medication. During the following weeks, Hiraoka repeatedly attacks Sadako, develops an obsession for her and tries to talk her into living with him in Tokyo. Sadako is reluctant to his plan, and although she lets go of her intention to poison him during their burdensome walk through a snowy landscape, he eventually dies of his heart disease. At the end of the film, Sadako has found the self-confidence to file a suit against her husband's family to be included in the family register.

== Cast ==
- Masumi Harukawa - Sadako Takahashi
- Kō Nishimura - Koichi Takahashi
- Shigeru Tsuyuguchi - Hiraoka
- Yūko Kusunoki - Yoshiko Masuda
- Ranko Akagi - Tadae Takahashi
- Tomio Aoki
- Kazuo Kitamura - Takahashi
- Yoshi Katō - Seizo Takahashi
- Tanie Kitabayashi - Kinu Takahashi
- Seiji Miyaguchi - Genji Miyata
- Shoichi Ozawa - Kazuyuki Tamaru

== Themes ==
Unholy Desire embodies many of the central interests in Imamura's career, including strong, lower-class women who survive in spite of their oppressive surroundings, and an earthy, humorous approach to sex. For film scholar Alexander Jacoby, Unholy Desire, like its predecessor, Imamura's The Insect Woman, is "about the triumphs of amoral women over circumstances". Both films' heroines are "survivors, using any means necessary to endure".

== Reception ==
Jeva Lange of Screen Slate called Unholy Desire "one of the oddest yet most rewarding pieces in Imamura's considerable repertoire." According to Jasper Sharp of Midnight Eye, Unholy Desire, despite being overlong, "marks the most complete consolidation of the themes that inform [Imamura's] initial cycle of features".

== Awards ==
Unholy Desire received the Mainichi Film Awards for Best Actor (Kō Nishimura), Best Supporting Actress (Yūko Kusunoki), Best Cinematography (Shinsaku Himeda) and Best Sound Recording (Koshiro Jinbo). Kō Nishimura also received the Blue Ribbon Award for Best Supporting Actor.
