= House of Terror (disambiguation) =

House of Terror is a museum in Budapest, Hungary.

House of Terror or House of Terrors may also refer to:

- The House of Terror, a 1928 film directed by William M. Pizor
- House of Terror (1960 film), a Mexican film
- House of Terror (1973 film), an American film
- House of Terrors, a 1965 Japanese film
