= The Pornographers =

1966 film by Shōhei Imamura

- Video cover of The Pornographers
- Directed by: Shōhei Imamura
- Written by: Shōhei Imamura; Kōji Numata
- Based on: Erogotoshitachi by Akiyuki Nosaka
- Starring: Shōichi Ozawa; Sumiko Sakamoto; Masaomi Kondō; Keiko Sagowa
- Cinematography: Shinsaku Himeda
- Edited by: Mutsuo Tanji
- Music by: Toshirō Kusunoki
- Production company: Imamura Productions
- Distributed by: Nikkatsu
- Release date: March 12, 1966 (Japan)
- Running time: 128 minutes
- Country: Japan
- Language: Japanese

The Pornographers (“エロ事師たち”より 人類学入門, "Erogotoshitachi" yori jinruigaku nyūmon; lit. 'An introduction to anthropology through pornographers') is a 1966 satirical Japanese film directed by Shōhei Imamura. It is based on the novel Erogotoshitachi by Akiyuki Nosaka.

== Plot ==
The Pornographers (1966), directed by Shōhei Imamura, follows Subuyan Ogata, a small-time pornographer operating on the fringes of Japanese society. He produces and sells illicit stag films while living in a cramped house with his landlady Haru, her daughter Keiko, and other drifting family members. Subuyan prides himself on running a tight, almost businesslike operation, but his domestic situation is messy and emotionally tangled, blurring the lines between family, desire, and exploitation.

Subuyan becomes increasingly obsessed with Keiko, who represents both innocence and temptation. At the same time, Haru—who believes her dead husband’s spirit lives on in a carp—maintains a strange, superstitious hold over the household. The film mixes dark comedy with psychological tension, showing how Subuyan rationalizes his work as a natural extension of human desire, even as his behavior grows more intrusive and morally questionable.

As the police begin cracking down on pornography, Subuyan’s business becomes riskier. He is arrested and briefly imprisoned, but even this doesn’t fundamentally change him. Instead, he adapts—attempting to modernize his operations and stay one step ahead of the law. His worldview remains stubbornly pragmatic: he sees himself as providing a service rather than committing a crime, despite the increasingly chaotic consequences around him.

By the end, Subuyan’s personal and professional lives collapse into absurdity. His schemes unravel, his relationships deteriorate, and his obsessive desires isolate him further. Imamura closes the film on a darkly ironic note, suggesting that Subuyan is trapped in a cycle he neither fully understands nor can escape—embodying the director’s broader themes of base human instincts, social hypocrisy, and the persistence of desire beneath civilized norms.

== Cast ==
- Shōichi Ozawa as Subuyan Ogata
- Sumiko Sakamoto as Haru Matsuda
- Keiko Sagawa as Keiko Matsuda, Haru's daughter
- Haruo Tanaka as Banteki
- Nakamura Ganjirō II as Elderly executive from Hakucho Company
- Masaomi Kondō as Kōichi Matsuda, Haru's son
- Akira Nishimura as Detective Sanada
- Ichirō Sugai as Shinun Ogata, Subuyan's father
- Akiji Kobayashi
- Shinichi Nakano as Kabō
- Chōchō Miyako as Virgin House Madame
- Kazuo Kitamura as Doctor

== Production and reception ==
The film is a satirical black comedy, depicting the underbelly of the Japanese post-war economic miracle, in this case pornographers and small time gangsters in Osaka. It has been called Imamura's best-known film outside Japan.

== Release ==
The Pornographers was released in Japan in March 1966 where it was distributed by Nikkatsu. It was released in the United States by Toho International with English subtitles in August 1966.
