= Theater of Life (1983 film) =

- Film poster
- Japanese: 人生劇場
- Directed by: Kinji Fukasaku; Sadao Nakajima; Junya Satō
- Written by: Kinji Fukasaku; Sadao Nakajima (own segment); Tatsuo Nogami (screenplay); Shirō Ozaki (novel); Junya Satō
- Cinematography: Shōhei Andō (for Fukasaku); Kiyoshi Kitasaka (for Nakajima); Hiroyuki Namiki (for Satō)
- Music by: Masato Kai
- Distributed by: Toei
- Release date: January 29, 1983 (Japan)
- Running time: 138 minutes
- Country: Japan
- Language: Japanese

Theater of Life (Japanese: 人生劇場, Hepburn: Jinsei Gekijō) is a 1983 Japanese film directed by Kinji Fukasaku, Sadao Nakajima, and Junya Satō. It is based on three parts of the Theater of Life series of novels by Shirō Ozaki, 青春篇 Youth Chapter, 情熱篇 Lust Chapter, and 残侠篇 Spirit Chapter, similarly to the 1972 adaptation directed by Tai Katō. The Youth Chapter segment was directed by Junya Satō, the Lust Chapter segment was directed by Kinji Fukasaku, and the Spirit Chapter segment was directed by Sadao Nakajima.

== Cast ==
- Toshiyuki Nagashima as Hyōkichi Aonari
- Toshiro Mifune as Hyōtarō Aonari
- Tomisaburō Wakayama as Tsune Kira
- Wakiko Kano as Orin
  - Kaori Takahashi as Young Orin
- Eiji Okuda as Hayao Fukioka
- Mitsuru Hirata as Yasuta Yokoi
- Kie Nakai as Otoyo
- Keiko Matsuzaka as Osode
- Miki Sanjo as Omine
- Masako Araki as Okatsu
- Keizō Kanie as Kōjirō Okabe
- Aiko Morishita as Teruyo Ogishi
- Hideo Murota as Narahei
- Morio Kazama as Miyagawa
- Mikio Narita as Hakudō Ōmizo
- Kō Nishimura as Kokin
- Takashi Noguchi as Nihon Kōronsha Employee
- Ryuji Katagiri as Kazuya Shinkai
- Masaharu Arikawa as Vigilante
- Tankobo Kibaji as Jin
- Jūkei Fujioka as Sugigen
- Nenji Kobayashi as Terakane
- Masataka Iwao as Big Tiger
- Rei Okamoto as Otama
- Makino Sayoto as Otane
- Kantarō Suga as Mr. Kurōma
- Hiroki Matsukata as Hishakaku
- Yuriko Mishima
- Kenjirō Ishimaru as Actor Portraying Asano Naganori
- Kinji Nakamura as Actor Portraying Kira Yoshinaka
- Nagare Hagiwara as Actor Portraying Kira no Nikichi
- Sakae Umezu
- Shun Sugata as Student
- Kuniomi Kitani as Officer

== Accolades ==
Morio Kazama received the Japan Academy Film Prize for Outstanding Performance by an Actor in a Supporting Role for his role as Miyagawa in Theater of Life as well as his role as Hidetsugu of Niō in The Geisha at the 7th Japan Academy Film Prize.
