= Mona Lisa's Smile =

- Also known as: Mona Riza no Hohoemi
- Genre: Mystery; Drama
- Written by: Yasushi Fukuda; Yoko Iino; Jun Maekawa
- Directed by: Kozo Nagayama; Daisuke Tajima; Kazuhiro Kobayashi
- Starring: Yōsuke Eguchi; Riona Hazuki; Matsumoto Hakuō II; Masato Ibu; Junichi Okada; Yoshizumi Ishihara; Satoko Oshima; Hajime Okayama; Shiro Namiki
- Country of origin: Japan
- Original language: Japanese
- No. of seasons: 1
- No. of episodes: 11

Production
- Producer: Toru Kawai
- Running time: 45 minutes

Original release
- Network: Fuji Television
- Release: 12 January – 22 March 2000

Mona Lisa's Smile (モナリザの微笑, Mona Riza no Hohoemi) is a 2000 Japanese television drama for Fuji Television, about an art appraiser working at an Auction house in Tokyo while searching for a legendary counterpart to the Mona Lisa, the Mona Lisa of Sorrow.

== Premise ==
Art expert and auctioneer Masayuki Tachibana (Yōsuke Eguchi) joins the newly established auction house Weisz Tokyo, ostensibly to audit and oversee its operations on behalf of the company's London head office, while secretly pursuing his own agenda – the search for the whereabouts of the real copy of Leonardo da Vinci's Mona Lisa, as well as its legendary counterpart and companion piece, the Mona Lisa of Sorrow.

== Cast ==
=== Weisz Tokyo Auction House ===
- Yōsuke Eguchi as Masayuki Tachibana – art expert and auctioneer, transferring from the Weisz London head office
- Riona Hazuki as Chizuru Orihara – art restorer
- Masatō Ibu as Kaoru Usami – manager of Weisz Tokyo
- Junichi Okada as Takuro Okajima – assistant manager and accountant, formerly a banker from Toto Bank
- Yoshizumi Ishihara as Yoshiharu Kamei – Oriental art specialist
- Shiro Namiki as Shuhei Miyashita – jewelry specialist
- Hajime Okayama as Osamu Motegi – wine specialist
- Satoko Oshima as Utako Sakazaki – Western art specialist
- Aki Shibuya and Yumie Kobayashi as assistants and announcers

=== Others ===
- Matsumoto Hakuō II as Kiichiro Tsunashima – Chairman of GT Systems (credited as Koshiro Matsumoto)
- Yumiko Ishitomi as Kiyoko Onuki – secretary to chairman Tsunashima
- Masami Hayashi as Midori Takashiro – art coordinator and one of Usami's regular customers

== Episodes ==
No.	Title	Original release date
1	"Final bid estimate 20 billion yen" Transliteration: "Rakusatsu yosō 200 oku-en" (Japanese: 落札予想200億円)	12 January 2000
At the grand opening of auction house Weisz Tokyo, art expert Masayuki Tachibana shows up uninvited and successfully bids for a Greek marble statue, before publicly exposing it as a forgery. Much to the chagrin of manager Kaoru Usami, Tachibana subsequently reveals he was dispatched from the London head office to help audit their operations. Later, while preparing for tomorrow's auctions, Tachibana learns from Usami that the mysterious item marked X at the end of the catalog is a known counterfeit of famed Mona Lisa, before relating to an astonished staff the existence and history of a purported companion piece – the Mona Lisa of Sorrow. Meanwhile, Weisz Tokyo art restorer Chizuru Orihara is also seeking the Mona Lisa of Sorrow for her own reasons, as is GT Systems chairman Kiichiro Tsunashima.
2	"The Treasure of Versailles"; Transliteration: "Berusaiyu no hihō" (Japanese: ベルサイユの秘宝)	19 January 2000
3	"The Seventh Van Gogh"; Transliteration: "7-Mai-me no Gohho" (Japanese: 7枚目のゴッホ)	26 January 2000
4	"Tears of the Bisque Doll"; Transliteration: "Bisukudōru no namida" (Japanese: ビスクドールの涙)	2 February 2000
5	"The Legacy of the Empress Dowager"; Transliteration: "Seitaigō no isan" (Japanese: 西太后の遺産)	9 February 2000
6	"The Angel's Gift"; Transliteration: "Tenshi no okurimono" (Japanese: 天使の贈り物)	16 February 2000
7	"Love · An Encounter"; Transliteration: "Ai・meguri ai" (Japanese: 愛・めぐり逢い)	23 February 2000
8	"A vicious art museum and an actress in debt ...The Mystery of Satsuma Kiriko"; Transliteration: "Akutoku bijutsukan to shakkin joyū… Satsuma Kiriko no nazo" (Japanese: 悪徳美術館と借金女優…薩摩切子の謎)	1 March 2000
9	"A trap of revenge set in a cursed incense burner" Transliteration: "Noroi no kōro ni shikake rareta fukushū no wana" (Japanese: 呪いの香炉に仕掛けられた復讐の罠)	8 March 2000
10	"All members! Second Mona Lisa Recovery Operation"; Transliteration: "Zen'in shūgō! 2-Mai-me no Monariza dakkan sakusen" (Japanese: 全員集合！2枚目のモナリザ奪還作戦)	15 March 2000
11	"Living dead return! The final winner" Transliteration: "Inochigake no donden-gaeshi! Saigo no shōsha" (Japanese: 命がけのドンデン返し！最後の勝者)	22 March 2000
