= I, the Executioner =

I, the Executioner may refer to:

- I, the Executioner (1968 film), Japanese film
- I, the Executioner (2024 film), South Korean film
