= League of Gangsters =

1963 Japanese crime film

- Film poster
- Japanese: ギャング同盟
- Directed by: Kinji Fukasaku
- Written by: Ryuta Akimoto; Yoshida Mita; Susumi Saji; K.F. Susukida
- Screenplay by: Kinji Fukasaku
- Produced by: Shigeru Okada
- Starring: Ryōhei Uchida; Kei Satō
- Cinematography: Yoshikazu Yamazawa
- Edited by: Osamu Tanaka
- Music by: Riichirō Manabe
- Production company: Toei Company
- Release date: July 31, 1963 (Japan)
- Running time: 80 minutes
- Country: Japan
- Language: Japanese

League of Gangsters (Japanese: ギャング同盟, Hepburn: Gyangu Dōmei) is a 1963 Japanese black-and-white crime action film directed by Kinji Fukasaku starring Ryōhei Uchida and Kei Satō. It was Uchida's first starring role in a film.

In the film, a yakuza member is released for prison and finds that his former territory has been taken over by a rival criminal organization. Seeking revenge against these rivals, he re-organizes his former gang by recruiting financially struggling former gang members. They kidnap the rival organization's chairman and his daughter, demanding a ransom for their return.

== Plot ==
Upon his release from prison, Kazama, accompanied by his fellow yakuza Takamoto, sets out to take vengeance on the gang that took over his territory and has meanwhile evolved into a prosperous and well-connected organization of businesses with significant influence. He gathers the struggling members of his old gang who are willing to participate, including destitute gambler Kusunoki and his wife Masae as well as young Shiga, a.k.a. "Boy", who currently works arranging jobs for female dancers, but singer Nagashi refuses, instead planning to leave Japan to be a singer elsewhere.

Former gang member Ogata has meanwhile taken employment with the rival gang in order to survive, so Kazama and Takamoto use his position to learn where the chairman of the group of companies will be booked in a hotel for an upcoming deal with Westerners. Kazama and Takamoto case the hotel and plan a kidnapping carried out with the aid of Kusunoki, Masae, and "Boy", during which they unexpectedly end up kidnapping the chairman's daughter Akiko along with the chairman. Takamoto calls the company president of Daido Real Estate where Ogata works and demands 60 million yen as a ransom for the chairman, which the board approves. Takamoto tells the company president to deliver it to a restaurant on the coast called The Seagull and to come alone, but the board suspects that Ogata is an inside man and assigns the transport to someone else. Kazama shoots the bagman but is chased down by other yakuza before being picked up by Nagashi, who dies fighting the rival gang to buy time for the others to escape.

At the safehouse, the bag with money is found to have been replaced with a bag of paper scraps. The gang fruitlessly attempts to get information about the agency out of the chairman by threatening to rape his daughter, but the chairman remains expressionless and shows no concern. Ogata drives to the safehouse but is tailed by the rival gang, who surround the safehouse under the leadership of the company president. Ogata is sent out to negotiate the ransom, but is shot by the rival gang. Upset that the chairman shows no concern for her, Akiko threatens to tell the gang about the deal with the Westerners, causing the chairman to visibly panic. Thrilled by Kazama's fervor, Akiko switches sides and convinces Kazama to give her a gun so that she can live like he does.

Later, Masae attempts to help the chairman escape, but is caught by Kusunoki. She tries to shoot him and misses, causing him to shoot and kill her. Kusunoki angrily attacks the rival gang outside and is killed. Takamoto attempts to run away but ends up dying in the shootout. Kazama and "Boy" use TNT to blow up the remaining henchmen, but "Boy" is shot and dies. Kazama laments that he achieved nothing but the death of his companions, and Akiko says that she will be his companion and joins his gang. They walk off to start over.

== Cast ==
- Ryōhei Uchida as Kazama
- Kei Satō as Takamoto
- Rokuhiro Toura as Ogata
- Rinichi Yamamoto as Kusunoki
- Yuko Kusunoki as Masae
- Harumi Sone as Shiga a.k.a. "Boy"
- I. George as Nagashi
- Kenji Susukida as Kishida
- Yoshiko Mita as Akiko
- Mikijiro Taira as Miyajima
- Nobuo Hachina as Kondo

== Production ==
League of Gangsters is the seventh film in Toei's Gyangu (English: "Gang") series. Fukasaku had previously directed the fourth film in the series, Gang vs. G-Men (1962), which was the first film shot by Fukasaku in color.

Kimihiko Kamata of eiganokuni.com wrote, "The ruins of Camp McNair, an amusement park near the US military base near Lake Yamanaka with saloons that appear in the Western drama Kagamihara, [...] is a wonderful location, and it was later also used as a location for League of Gangsters."

The film's Japanese title has been translated as League of Gangsters and Gang Alliance.

== Reception, analysis, and legacy ==
In an interview with Fukasaku contained in the book Outlaw Masters of Japanese Film, Chris Desjardins said, "The Gang series, even though a bit old-fashioned at first, as it progressed it became more true to life, for example your League Of Gangsters – a precursor of the jitsuroku type of yakuza picture that became commonplace in the seventies. [...]" Fukasaku responded, "I think you're correct to say that. But the stories were all fictitious and not based on any real people or events."

Desjardins later discusses the Gang series, "the best of which were probably Ishii's Underworld Boss – Eleven Gangsters and Kinji Fukasaku's League Of Gangsters."

In his 2010 book A History of Horror, author Wheeler Winston Dixon writes, "Fukasaku, who was born in 1930, directed numerous yakuza films from the 1960s onward, and in 1970 he was tapped to direct the Japanese sections of the international co-production Tora! Tora! Tora! when Akira Kurosawa bowed out. Such films as Gyangu domei (League of Gangsters, 1963), Kyokatsu koso waga jiinsei (Blackmail Is My Life, 1968), the science-fiction horror film Gamma daisan go: Uchi dai sakusen (The Green Slime, 1968) and Shikingen godatsu (Gambling Den Heist, 1975) typify Fukasaku’s early output."

A review on eiganokuni.com reads, "Fukasaku's theme of how to make a gangster film in Japan, where gangs do not have a [sic] roots, is reflected in the first half of the film, from the prologue with the title sequence to when the former comrades are gathered together, but the second half feels like it's too busy just depicting the battle."
