= By a Man's Face Shall You Know Him =

1966 Japanese yakuza film

Japanese name
- Kanji: 男の顔は履歴書
Transcriptions
- Romanization: Otokonokao wa rirekisho
- Directed by: Tai Kato
- Screenplay by: Seiji Hoshikawa; Tai Kato
- Produced by: Yoshitoshi Masumoto
- Starring: Noboru Ando; Ichiro Nakatani; Sanae Nakahara; Juzo Itami
- Cinematography: Tetsuo Takaha
- Edited by: Iwao Ishii
- Music by: Hajime Kaburagi
- Production company: Shochiku
- Release date: 1966
- Running time: 89 minutes
- Language: Japanese

By a Man's Face Shall You Know Him (Japanese: 男の顔は履歴書, Hepburn: Otokonokao wa rirekisho; lit. 'A Man’s Face Is His Personal History') is a Japanese film directed by Tai Kato in 1966. It is also known under the title History of a Man's Face.

== Plot ==
When a man is brought to the hospital where Dr. Amamiya is working, the latter recognises the patient and recalls previous times they met: firstly during World War II, and later when the man owned a market and South Korean gangsters were taking over the entire area.

== Cast ==
- Noboru Ando as Dr. Amamiya
- Ichiro Nakatani as Choi
- Sanae Nakahara
- Juzo Itami
- Akemi Mari as Li Keishun
- Hiroshi Fujioka
- Yoshiko Kayama
- Bunta Sugawara
- Ryohei Uchida
- Kanjuro Arashi as Nakamura

== Home media ==
The film was released on Blu-ray in the United Kingdom by Radiance Films on 26 February 2024. It was released in North America by Film Movement on March 25, 2025, as part of a two film set titled Two Faces of Tai Kato, alongside I, the Executioner.

== Critical reception ==
By a Man's Face Shall You Know Him was well-received in Japan by the country's various cinema clubs, placing well in their top films of the year lists.

Reviewing the Blu-ray release of the film, Kat Ellinger praises the film as a "tense, poignant portrayal of post-war class strife and masculinity in crisis". She also praises Ando's performance and states his casting "adds a classic yakuza flavour to a film which otherwise betrays low-budget exploitation film conventions by untypically dealing in political themes."

In his encyclopedia of Japanese gangster films Gun and Sword, Chris D. rates the film three and a half stars out of four, calling it "an intense, pared-to-the-bone melodrama". It was also included by Jasper Sharp in a list of 10 great Japanese gangster films for the BFI.

Alexander Jacoby was more critical of the film, seeing the violence of the film as taking away from a potentially interesting study of interracial relations in postwar Japan.
