= Seburi Monogatari =

1985 film

- DVD cover
- Directed by: Sadao Nakajima
- Written by: Sadao Nakajima
- Produced by: Tatsuo Honda; Masao Sato
- Starring: Kenichi Hagiwara
- Cinematography: Fuminori Minami
- Release date: 11 May 1985 (Japan)
- Running time: 125 minutes
- Country: Japan
- Language: Japanese

Seburi Monogatari (Japanese: 瀬降り物語; The Seburi Story) is a 1985 Japanese drama film directed by Sadao Nakajima. It was entered into the 35th Berlin International Film Festival.

== Cast ==
- Kenichi Hagiwara as Hajime Kinoshita
- Yumiko Fujita as Kuni
- Michiko Kohno as Hide
- Takashi Naitô as Kazuo
- Ai Saotome as Hana
- Eiko Nagashima as Mitsu
- Taiji Tonoyama as Kamezo
- Ken Mitsuishi as Jiro
- Hideo Murota as Kuzushiri
- Rei Okamoto as Tome
- Asao Uchida as Ayutachi
- Nenji Kobayashi as Army
- Yoshio Ichikawa as Imasuke
