= Yuko Kusunoki =

Japanese actress (born 1933)

Yūko Kusunoki
- Born: 1933 (age 92–93); Tokyo, Japan
- Occupation: Actor
- Years active: 1959–present

Yuko Kusunoki (楠侑子, Kusunoki Yūko; born 1933) is a Japanese actress. She appeared in more than twenty films since 1959.

== Selected filmography ==
Year	Title	Role	Ref(s)
1963	League of Gangsters	Masae	
1964	Unholy Desire		
1965	House of Terrors	Yoshie	
1967	Thirst for Love	Chieko	
1968	Goke, Body Snatcher from Hell	Noriko Tokuyasu	
1969	Eros + Massacre	Itsoku Masaoka	
1970	Dodes'ka-den	Misao	
