= Blackmail Is My Life =

- Japanese DVD cover
- Directed by: Kinji Fukasaku
- Written by: Shinji Fujiwara (book); Fumio Kōnami; Hirō Matsuda; Norio Osada
- Produced by: Akira Oda
- Starring: Hiroki Matsukata; Tomomi Sato; Hideo Murota; Akira Jo
- Cinematography: Keiji Maruyama
- Edited by: Keiichi Uraoka
- Music by: Hajime Kaburagi
- Production company: Shochiku Company
- Distributed by: Shochiku
- Release date: February 28, 1968
- Running time: 89 minutes
- Country: Japan
- Language: Japanese

Blackmail Is My Life (Japanese: 恐喝こそわが人生, Hepburn: Kyokatsu koso waga jinsei), also known as Blackmail Is My Business, is a 1968 Japanese crime film directed by Kinji Fukasaku.

== Plot ==
Shun Muraki is a low-level blackmailer who specializes in extorting money from prosperous Tokyo businessmen by threatening to reveal their crimes and indiscretions. His crew includes the former yakuza member Seki, the failed boxer Neguchi (nicknamed "Zero"), and the alluring Otoki. They regularly meet in their hideout in the back of a restaurant and follow the three rules of blackmail: don't make any new friends, don't push too hard, and never hit the same mark twice.

Shun Muraki finds his way into the business when he overhears that his boss at the restaurant where he waits tables is selling fake whiskey. After being beaten for not promising to stay silent he blackmails the source of the fake alcohol for 100,000 yen. They follow up this success by kidnapping a gangster who runs a brothel that films its clients to blackmail them and the blackmailers force him to give up all of the film reels in exchange for his life. One of the reels features popular actress Natsuko Mizuhara, whom Shun pressures into becoming his lover by threatening to release the film.

Zero's father is found floating in Yokohama Bay and the police suspect murder, noting the amount of water in his lungs and drugs found in his system. Zero knows that his father was using drugs at the beach and Seki tells them that the drug traffic there is controlled by the Nagamisawa family led by Nagamisawa and his lieutenant Komori. Zero beats up the man who killed his father and they learn about an upcoming drug deal involving Nagamisawa. Shun's crew ambushes the deal with Molotov cocktails but the money accidentally gets burned.

Kosuke Endo, a loan shark with millions in industrial loans, is shot at by a man with one gold tooth while leaving a meeting with political mastermind Shinzo Mizuno. Shun saves Endo and Endo tells Shun that he owes him. Newspaper reporter Hiroshi Miyake and Goro Okunaga, an old acquaintance of Shun, believe that the attack was planned by Shinzo Mizuno to send a warning. Okunaga explains that Endo contributed 700 million yen to the campaign of the Conservative Party Prime Minister at the last minute to ensure his election and in return demanded a written statement known as the Otaguro Memorandum which could force the resignation of Prime Minister Shimizu. Endo uses the memorandum to extort money as well as protect his own life and Shun's crew plans to get the memorandum for themselves. Shun visits Endo, who explains that he knows it was only a warning because the memorandum would be leaked if he were to die. Shun threatens that he will find Endo's weakness and force him to hand over the memorandum.

Later that night Zero spies on Endo's residence but is caught by the man with the gold tooth and beaten to death. Natsuko tells Shun that she is leaving him because she received a marriage proposal from the president of the Showa department store. Seki feels overwhelmed by the odds against them and decides to stop being a blackmailer. Shun and Otoki allow him to run the restaurant instead.

Shun and Otoki kidnap Endo and threaten to burn him alive, forcing him to hand over the memorandum. They call Shinzo Mizuno from a payphone and demand 100 million yen in exchange for the memorandum. Overcome with excitement, Shun and Otoki make love in the car. Shun gives Otoki the memorandum and tells her to give it to Okunaga, who has newspaper connections. Okunaga tells Otoki that Endo has been arrested for forging the documents he used to expose others and tries to destroy the memorandum out of fear of the overwhelming odds against them but Otoki insists that it is real and believes that the newspapers are in on the conspiracy. Shun goes to the place designated for the exchange in front of the National Theatre at 4:00 p.m. but notices a newspaper headline that Endo was arrested for forgery and gives up in frustration. He nonchalantly walks away but as he is crossing the street he is stabbed in the stomach by an unknown man. Shinzo Mizuno, who has been watching from his car, tells his driver to drive away as Shun bleeds to death in the busy crosswalk.

== Cast ==
- Hiroki Matsukata as Shun Muraki
- Tomomi Sato as Otoki
- Hideo Murota as Seki
- Akira Jo as Noguchi, also known as "Zero-sen"
- Kenjiro Ishiyama as Endō
- Tetsuro Tamba as Mizuno
- Shinjirō Ehara as Okunaka
- Yusuke Kawazu as assassin
- Ryōhei Uchida as Kito
- Eriko Sono as Natsuko Mizuhara
- Torahiko Hamada as Tanida
- Yoko Mihara as Mami
- Keiji Takamiya as Oribe
- Shiro Amakusa as Mikawa-ya
- Sakae Umezu
- Hiroshi Hijikata
- Shiro Kitamachi as Igashira
- Kosaku Okano
- Keijiro Morozumi as Nagamizawa
- Nigori Miki
- Nami Katsura as Rika
- Ryusuke Kita
- Sonosuke Oda
- Kenji Sonoda
- Kentaro Imai
- Tadayuki Okamoto
- Hideto Nakagawa
- Sataro Taki
- Shuichi Maka
- Terumitsu Kawashima
- Daisuke Makako
- Akie Kokubu
- Shotaro Oshima
- Hideaki Komori
- Sukeyuki Sawada
- Shigeru Amachi as Miyake

== Production ==
Director Kinji Fukasaku and three writers wrote the film in a hotel in just one weekend. Although Fukasaku went unaccredited for his part in the writing. In the North American release's liner notes, Patrick Macias writes that Sadao Nakajima's 1966 film 893 Gurentai was an influence; with Fukasaku writing the role of Shun specifically for its actor Hiroki Matsukata.

Fukasaku originally shot the final death scene in Ginza himself, hidden in a car in order to capture real reactions from the public. But the footage lacked drama and intimacy, and the scene was re-shot with Hiroki Matsukata purposefully staggering towards the crowds to unsuccessfully entice a reaction.

John Berra writes that Fukasaku "takes his directorial inspiration from the French New Wave" and that the film's "third act was reportedly inspired by real-life real-estate swindles that involved Kakuei Tanaka, who was then the Finance Minister of Japan, and would later become the nation's Prime Minister, and the episodic structure of the film serves to illustrate how greedy even small-time operators were becoming in an era of economic growth." Berra also identifies a tribute to Seijun Suzuki's cult classic Tokyo Drifter (1966), noting that the film's characters whistle its theme song. Both films' scores were written by the same composer, Hajime Kaburagi.

== Critical reception ==
Macias wrote that Matsukata's performance as Shun helped lay the foundation for Fukasaku's protagonists to come; equal parts lovable and amoral, and "destined for oblivion."

Glenn Erickson for DVD Talk wrote that Blackmail Is My Life "channels the spirit of rebellious anarchy seen in Jean-Luc Godard, filtered through America's Bonnie & Clyde. Fukasaku adds a jumpy 'chaotic but formulaic' style that keeps it moving along, through a lot of crime clichés."

In a different review for DVD Talk, Stuart Galbraith IV called the movie "An enjoyable but generally routine crime melodrama." He praised the film's highly stylized visuals, its black and white and tinted flashbacks and its freeze frames, and Kaburagi's musical score. But called the unbelievable and "pure macho male fantasy" relationship between Shun and Natsuko its biggest problem.

After describing the various visual effects, Scott Tobias of The A.V. Club wrote that "An excess of style takes some of the coherency and sting out of Blackmail, which is sometimes guilty of appropriating Godard-esque tricks for cool's sake." He referred to the film as inferior to Nagisa Oshima's similar Cruel Story of Youth.

In the 2010 book Japan, John Berra writes that Fukasaku "integrates his stylistic sensibility within a recognizable social-economic milieu and comments on the corrupt underbelly of the economic boom" and describes the first half of the film as "bright, colourful, amoral fun" before the later development plot in the second half of the film.

== Home video release ==
Blackmail Is My Life was presented by the American Cinematheque in 2002. They then released it on DVD in North America with Home Vision Entertainment on January 6, 2004.
