= Masumi Harukawa =

Japanese actress

- 春川ますみ
- Born: Machie Takigawa; 16 November 1935 (age 90); Utsunomiya, Japan
- Occupation: Actress
- Years active: 1959–

Masumi Harukawa (春川ますみ, Harukawa Masumi), born Machie Takigawa (瀧川マチエ, Takigawa Machie), is a Japanese actress.

== Filmography ==
- 1961: Girls of the Night
- 1963: The Insect Woman
- 1964: Unholy Desire
- 1964: Kunoichi Keshō
- 1965: House of Terrors
- 1966: The Threat
- 1967: Zatoichi's Cane Sword
- 1968: The Human Bullet
- 1968: Curse of the Blood
- 1974: Pastoral: To Die in the Country
- 1974: Tora-san's Lullaby
- 1975: The Gate of Youth
- 1975–1979: Torakku Yarō
- 1975–1994: Edo o Kiru
- 1978: Pink Lady no Katsudō Daishashin
- 1978–1987: Abarenbō Shōgun
- 1980: Shogun's Ninja
- 1986: Michi
- 1987: Hachiko Monogatari
- 1992: Tōki Rakujitsu
