= Owls' Castle =

- Film poster
- Directed by: Masahiro Shinoda
- Screenplay by: Masahiro Shinoda; Katsuo Naruse
- Based on: Fukurō no Shiro by Ryōtarō Shiba
- Produced by: Shigeaki Hazama; Masaru Koibuchi
- Starring: Kiichi Nakai; Mayu Tsuruta; Riona Hazuki
- Cinematography: Tatsuo Suzuki
- Edited by: Hiroshi Yoshida
- Music by: Joji Yuasa
- Production company: Nintendo
- Distributed by: Toho
- Release date: October 30, 1999 (Japan)
- Running time: 138 minutes
- Country: Japan
- Language: Japanese
- Budget: ¥1,300,000,000

Owls' Castle (Japanese: 梟の城, Hepburn: Fukurō no Shiro) is a 1999 Japanese ninja-themed jidaigeki film directed by Masahiro Shinoda. It was co-written by Shinoda and Katsuo Naruse, and stars Kiichi Nakai. It is the second adaptation of Ryōtarō Shiba's 1959 novel Fukurō no Shiro, the first being the 1963 film Castle of Owls. Toho released the film on October 30, 1999, in Japan.

== Cast ==
- Kiichi Nakai as Jūzō Tsuzura
- Takaya Kamikawa as Gohei Kazama
- Mayu Tsuruta as Kohagi
- Riona Hazuki as Kisaru
- Shōhei Hino as Kuroami
- Akiji Kobayashi
- Akira Nakao
- Mako Iwamatsu as Toyotomi Hideyoshi
- Jinpachi Nezu as Hattori Hanzō
- Kinnosuke Hannayagi as Ishida Mitsunari
- Shima Iwashita
- Masahiko Tsugawa
- Atsuo Nakamura

== Production ==
Nintendo was a production partner on the film, and the use of special effects and computer-generated imagery was widely touted in the film's marketing.

== Awards and accolades ==
- Nikkan Sports Film Awards: Ishihara Yujiro Award (1999).
- Puchon International Fantastic Film Festival: Best Director - Masahiro Shinoda (2000).
- Japanese Academy Awards: Best Art Direction - Yoshinobu Nishioka (2000). The film also received nine Japanese Academy Award nominations.
