= Kaze no Bushi =

Kaze no Bushi (Warrior of the Wind)
- Directed by: Tai Kato
- Written by: Tatsuo Nogami (screenplay); Ryōtarō Shiba (novel)
- Starring: Hashizo Okawa; Hiroko Sakuramachi; Naoko Kubo; Sanae Nakahara; Minoru Ōki; Kōji Nanbara
- Cinematography: Ko Matsui
- Edited by: Katsumi Kawai
- Music by: Chuji Kinoshita
- Production company: Toei Company
- Distributed by: Toei Company
- Release date: 1964
- Running time: 95 minutes
- Country: Japan
- Language: Japanese

Kaze no Bushi (風の武士) is a 1961 jidaigeki novel by Ryōtarō Shiba (the author of Fukurō no Shiro). It has been adapted into a 1960-1961 TV series and a Toei Company 1964 color chanbara film under the same title, directed by Tai Kato.

== Story ==
The film tells the story of a womanizing ninja named Nabari Shinzo (Hashizo Okawa) during the Tokugawa shogunate. Hired for a mission by the government, Shinzo soon finds himself in the center of a multi-sided intrigue, surrounded by double agents and fighting for the woman he loves (Hiroko Sakuramachi as Chino) against a treacherous ronin rival.

== DVD release ==
A remastered version of the film has been released on a DVD by Toei Video in Japan in 2006 (in 16:9 widescreen version with a trailer and photo gallery special features). The film has been later imported to U.S. with English subtitles under the title Warrior of the Wind (not to be confused with Warriors of the Wind).
