= Sanae Nakahara =

Japanese actress (1935–2012)

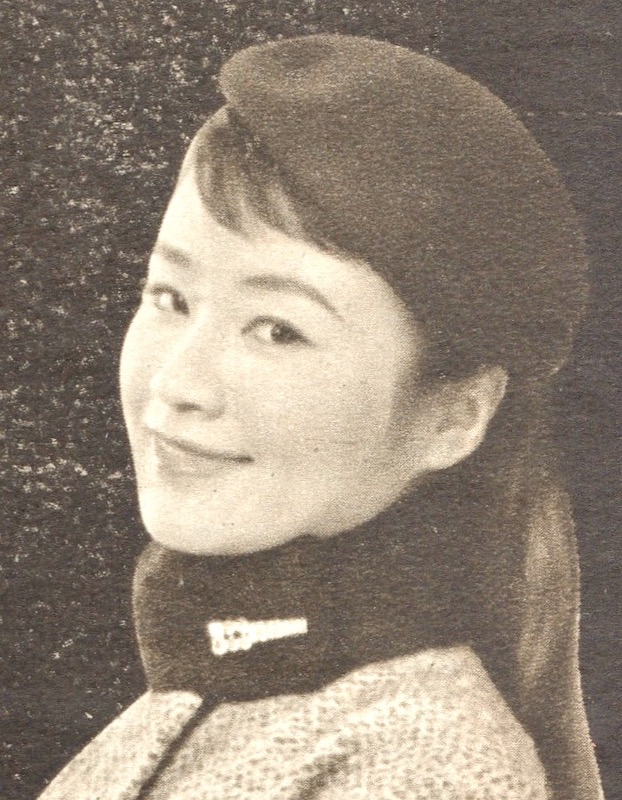
- Nakahara in 1956
- Born: July 31, 1935; Yotsuya Ward, Shinjuku, Tokyo, Japan
- Died: May 15, 2012 (aged 76); Tokyo, Japan
- Notable work: Yagyu Clan Conspiracy, Lady Snowblood, Virus
- Spouse: Kinji Fukasaku
- Children: Kenta Fukasaku

Sanae Nakahara (中原早苗, Nakahara Sanae; July 31, 1935 – May 15, 2012) was a Japanese actress from Tokyo. She starred in over 80 films and television shows, the most prominent being her role in the films Lady Snowblood (1973), Shogun's Samurai (1978), and Virus (1980). Her husband was famed Japanese film director Kinji Fukasaku, and her son, Kenta Fukasaku, is another well-known Japanese film director.

== Early life and education ==
She graduated from the Kunimoto Girls' High School. Her mother was a stage actress and raised her after divorcing her father.

== Career ==
She first starred in the film Mura Hachibu while still in high school, a film about the Shizuoka Prefecture Ueno village ostracism incident. Two years later she signed an exclusive contract with Japanese movie studio Nikkatsu, appearing in films such as Season of the Sun. She appeared in around 80 works over the next 8 years before becoming independent and acting for other studios.

Her most recent work had mainly been appearances on stage.

== Personal life ==
Nakahara married Kinji Fukasaku, who at the time was a young director at Toei, after they worked together on the film Wolves, Pigs and Men (1964). According to her, there were no meetings with Fukasaku, and although he gave her some acting instruction on the set, they hardly spoke to each other otherwise, but after the film he took, as she described, a furious approach with letters and phone calls. They decided to get married after being together only 3 months. Whenever he directed his own starring actresses, the media was taken with stories of the crisis of their marriage. She continued to support her husband’s filmmaking.

== Death ==
Nakahara died in her home on May 15, 2012. An apartment manager, at the request of her son, entered her home and found her collapsed in the bathroom. Doctors confirmed her death at the hospital with the cause of death being heart failure.

== Filmography ==
=== Actress ===
- Kani Kōsen (1953) .... Natsu
- Mura hatibu (1953)
- Moeru Shanghai (1954) .... Qing Lian
- Wakai hitotachi (1954)
- Aisureba koso (1955) .... Minako (segment 3)
- Ôkami (1955)
- Hi no tori (1956)
- Niko-yon monogatari (1956) .... Kimiko
- The Baby Carriage (1956) .... Sachiko Kaneda
- Gyûnyû ya Furankî (1956) .... Hatsu
- Frankie Bûchan no Aa gunkanki (1957)
- All We Want Is Happiness (1957) .... Kimiko
- Frankie Bûchan no zoku aa gunkaki: Nyogo ga-shima funsenki (1957)
- Temptation (1957) .... Mitsuko Sakuragi
- Kokoro to nikutai no tabi (1958) .... Ruriko Tachibana
- Chi to ai no shuppatsu (1958) .... Yôko Tsugawa
- Red Quay (1958)
- Endless Desire (1958) .... Ryuko
- Kurenai no Tsubasa (1958)
- Shiki no aiyoku (1958)
- Arashi no naka o tsuppashire (1958)
- Talented Woman (1959)
- Kawaii onna (1959) .... Yûko Ejima
- Nangoku Tosa o ato ni shite (1959) .... Asako Nakamura
- The Wandering Guitarist (1959) .... Sumiko Shôji
- Umi no wanâ (1959)
- Hatoba no muho mono (1959)
- Kizû darakê no ôkite (1960)
- Ajisai no uta (1960) .... Noriko Shimamura
- Wataridori itsu mata kaeru (1960)
- Smashing the 0-line (1960)
- Tokyo Mighty Guy (1960) .... Rirako
- Kenka Tarô (1960) .... Hideko Iwashita
- Umi no joji ni kakero (1960) .... Ranko Maki
- Ashita hareru ka (1960) .... Setsuko Kajiwara
- Ore wa dawâ sare naî (1960)
- Pigs and Battleships (1961) .... Hiromi
- Rokudenashi yarô (1961) .... Natsue Inoue
- Umi no shôbushi (1961) .... Kyôko
- Aitsu to watashi (1961) .... Asako Nomizo
- Dôdôtaru jinsei (1961) .... Hiroko
- Yajû no mon (1961) .... Yukari Saijô
- Sûkettô kagyô (1961)
- Aniki (1962)
- The Lucky General (1962)
- Omizu hara (1962)
- Namarî o buchi komê (1962)
- Mekishiko mushuku (1962) .... Teru Akazawa
- Gân wa sâmushô otoko no utasâ (1962)
- Kanto Wanderer (1963) .... Yamada Hanako
- Warrior of the Wind (1964) .... Oyumi
- Ankokugai Main Street (1964) .... Sanae Sanjo
- Zoku zûzûshii yatsu (1964) .... Maria
- Ôkami to buta to ningen (1964)
- Kunoichi ninpō (1964) .... Oyui
- Sleepy Eyes of Death: Sword of Fire (1965) .... Oryô
- Himo (1965) .... Akiko Kubo
- The Ghost of the One Eyed Man (1965) .... Michiko Onda
- Tange Sazen (1965, TV Series) .... Ofuji
- Kuroi yuwaku (1965)
- Jigoku no hatobâ (1965)
- Nihon Kyokaku-den: Ketto Kanda-matsuri (1966) .... Hatsue
- The Threat (1966) .... Mother of the baby
- By a Man's Face Shall You Know Him (1966) .... Maki
- Judo Showdown (1966) .... Tone
- Shojo jutai (1966) .... Keiko Miyaoka
- Zoku Tokyo nagaremono- Umi wa makka na koi no iro (1966)
- Mesu ga osu o kuikorosu: Kamakiri (1976) .... Yukie Soda
- Haru ranman (TV Series) (1967)
- Maboroshi kurozukin-yami ni tobu kage (1967)
- Women's Prison (1968) .... Prostitute's sister
- The House of the Sleeping Virgins (1968)
- Inochi karetemo (1968)
- Women's Cell (1968) .... Okma
- Kamisama no koibito (1968)
- Yoru No Kayo: Inochi Karetomo (1968)
- Shinjuku no hada (1968) .... Mineko
- I, the Executioner (1968) .... Keiko
- Secrets of a Woman's Temple (1969) .... Kyôen
- Nemuri Kyoshiro engetsu sappo (1969)
- Japan Organized Crime Boss (1969) .... Ooba's wife
- Dorifutazu desu yo! Tokkun tokkun mata tokkun (1969)
- Play It Cool (1970) .... Madame
- Kigeki: otoko ârimasû (1970)
- If You Were Young: Rage (1970)
- Under the Flag of the Rising Sun (1972) .... Mrs. Ochi
- Horror Theater Unbalance (TV Series) (1973) .... Morgue no satsujinsha
- Female Prisoner Scorpion: 701's Grudge Song (1973) .... Akiko Inagaki
- Lady Snowblood (1973) .... Kitahama, Okono
- Battles Without Honor and Humanity: Police Tactics (1974)
- Battles Without Honor and Humanity: Final Episode (1974)
- New Battles Without Honor and Humanity (1974)
- Police Tactics (1974) .... Kikue
- Aka chochin (1974)
- Cops vs. Thugs (1975)
- New Battles Without Honor and Humanity: The Boss's Head (1975)
- Aoi sei (1975)
- Oni no uta (1975)
- Shinsha no naka no onna (TV Series) (1976)
- Jitsuroku gaiden: Osaka dengeki sakusen (1976) .... Chie
- New Battles Without Honor and Humanity: Last Days of the Boss (1976) .... Hisano
- Hokuriku Proxy War (1977)
- Shogun's Samurai (1978) .... Lady Kusaga (Iemitsu's Aid)
- The Fall of Ako Castle (1978) .... Todano tsubone
- Nomugi Pass (1979)
- Virus (1980) .... Young Mother-Tokyo
- Furueru shita (1980) .... Sadae
- Asshii-tachi no machi (1981) .... Michiko
- The Challenge (TV Series) (1982) .... Cashier (as Sanae Nakahara)
- Ikiru (TV Series) (1983)
- Fureai (TV Series) (1986)
- Shinran: Path to Purity (1987) .... Woman at waiting
- Poruno joyû sayako no bôken (TV Movie) (1987)
- Nonchan no yume (TV Series) (1988)
- Pachinko monogatari (1990)
- Tanba Tetsuro no daireikai shindara odoroita!! (1990) .... Doctor of human community
- Onna nezumi kozô: Nerawareta Karakurijô shijô saiaku no dai hâdo (TV Movie) (1995)
- Kaze no rondo (TV Series) (1995)
- Manbiki G-Men Nikaidô Yuki 3 (TV Movie) (1999) .... Kuniko motohashi
- Manbiki G-Men Nikaidô Yuki 4 (TV Movie) (1999) .... Kuniko motohashi
- Manbiki G-Men Nikaidô Yuki 5 (TV Movie) (2000) .... Kuniko motohashi
- Lily Festival (2001) .... Teruko Satoyama
