= Eijanaika (film) =

Eijanaika / Why Not?
- DVD cover for Eijanaika (1981)
- Directed by: Shohei Imamura
- Written by: Hisashi Yamauchi
- Produced by: Shohei Imamura; Shoichi Ozawa; Shigemi Sugisaki; Jiro Tomoda
- Starring: Kaori Momoi; Shigeru Izumiya; Ken Ogata; Shigeru Tsuyuguchi; Masao Kusakari; Yūko Tanaka; Mitsuko Baisho; Shōhei Hino
- Cinematography: Shinsaku Himeda (as Masahisa Himeda)
- Edited by: Keiichi Uraoka
- Music by: Shin’ichirō Ikebe
- Distributed by: Imamura Productions, Shochiku Films Ltd., Beverly Pictures (USA)
- Release dates: March 14, 1981 (Japan); January 8, 1981 (USA)
- Running time: 151 minutes
- Country: Japan
- Language: Japanese

Eijanaika or Why Not? (ええじゃないか, Ee ja nai ka) is a 1981 Japanese film by director Shohei Imamura. It was screened in the Un Certain Regard section at the 1981 Cannes Film Festival.

== Plot ==
The film depicts carnivalesque atmosphere summed up by the cry "Ee ja nai ka" ("Why not?") in Japan in 1867 and 1868 in the days leading to the Meiji Restoration. It examines the effects of the political and social upheaval of the time, and culminates in a revelrous march on the Tokyo Imperial Palace, which turns into a massacre. Characteristically, Imamura focuses not on the leaders of the country, but on characters in the lower classes and on the fringes of society.

== Cast ==
- Kaori Momoi - Ine
- Shigeru Izumiya - Genji
- Shigeru Tsuyuguchi - Kinzo
- Masao Kusakari - Itoman
- Mitsuko Baisho - Oko
- Yōhei Kōno - Hara Ichinoshin
- Taiji Tonoyama
- Junzaburō Ban - Toramatsu
- Nenji Kobayashi - Matakichi
- Hideo Takamatsu - Koide Yamato no Kami
- Ako - Oyoshi
- Kazuo Kitamura - Koide Yamatonokami
- Jirō Yabuki - Senmatsu
- Yasuaki Kurata - Tsukinoki Hanjirō
- Hiroshi Inuzuka - Yamome no Roku
- Shōhei Hino - Magohichi
- Yūko Tanaka - Omatsu
- Ken Ogata - Furukawa
- Shoichi Ozawa - Sakunojo

== Awards ==
- Japanese Academy Awards 1982:
  - Best Supporting Actress: Yūko Tanaka
  - Newcomer of the Year: Yūko Tanaka
- Blue Ribbon Awards 1982:
  - Best Supporting Actress: Yūko Tanaka
- Hochi Film Awards 1981:
  - Best Supporting Actress: Yūko Tanaka
- Mainichi Film Concours 1982 :
  - Best Sound Recording: Shotaro Yoshida

== Reception ==
In a contemporary review for The New York Times, Vincent Canby wrote, "Eijanaika is a handsome, kaleidoscopic Japanese historical film about the years (1866-67) immediately preceding the restoration of the imperial Meiji family, which marked the triumph of the recently awakened, pro-Western movement in Japan. (It) is also an extremely difficult film to follow without extensive program notes. Even then, it's sometimes so obscure you suspect that essential scenes have been cut or that key lines of Japanese dialogue have not been translated by the English subtitles."

== See also ==
- 1981 in film
