= Oka no Ue no Himawari =

- Genre: Drama
- Starring: Kaoru Kobayashi; Yoko Shimada; Michitaka Tsutsui; Riona Hazuki; Atsuko Takahata
- Country of origin: Japan
- Original language: Japanese

Original release
- Network: TBS
- Release: April 11 – June 27, 1993

Related
- Kachō-san no Yakudoshi

Oka no Ue no Himawari (丘の上の向日葵) is a Japanese television drama series that first aired on TBS in 1993.

== Cast ==
- Kaoru Kobayashi
- Yoko Shimada
- Michitaka Tsutsui
- Riona Hazuki
- Atsuko Takahata
