= Reisen Ri =

Japanese actress (1942–2021)

- Born: Lee Cho-ja; 25 March 1942; Tokyo, Japan
- Died: 22 June 2021 (aged 79); Tokyo, Japan
- Other name: Hatsuko Otsuru
- Occupation: Actress
- Movement: Angura
- Spouse: Jūrō Kara (m. 1967; div. 1988)

Japanese name
- Kanji: 李麗仙
- Hiragana: り れいせん
- Katakana: リ レイセン

Korean name
- Hangul: 이여선
- Hanja: 李麗仙
- RR: I Yeoseon
- MR: I Yŏsŏn

Alternate name
- Hangul: 이초자
- RR: I Choja
- MR: I Ch'oja

Reisen Ri (Japanese: 李麗仙, Korean: 이여선, born Lee Cho-ja [이초자]; 25 March 1942 – 22 June 2021), also credited as Reisen Lee, was a Japanese actress of Zainichi Korean origin. She was associated with the Angura underground theatre movement, and was the wife of playwright Jūrō Kara.

== Life and career ==
A third-generation Zainichi Korean, Ri was born Lee Cho-ja in Tokyo in 1942. Her Japanese civil name was Hatsuko Otsuru. She graduated from Tokyo Metropolitan Hibiya High School and studied acting in Butai Geijutsu Gakuin, where she met her future husband Jūrō Kara.

She joined Kara's "Situation Theatre" in 1963 and gave her film debut in Nagisa Ōshima's 1969 Diary of a Shinjuku Thief. In 1972, she starred in Hiroshi Teshigahara's film Summer Soldiers, and in 1985, in Paul Schrader's Mishima: A Life in Four Chapters. In addition, she appeared on stage in Japan and South Korea.

== Personal life ==
Ri was married to Kara from 1967 to 1988, though they remained friends after separating. She was friends with South Korean dissident writer Kim Chi-ha.

In 1975, she acquired Japanese citizenship.

=== Death ===
She died in Tokyo of pneumonia on 22 June 2021, aged 79.

== Selected filmography ==
- 1969: Diary of a Shinjuku Thief
- 1972: Summer Soldiers
- 1973: Female Convict Scorpion: Beast Stable
- 1976: Ninkyo Gaiden Genkai Nada
- 1985: Mishima: A Life in Four Chapters
