= Futaro Yamada =

Japanese writer (1922–2001)

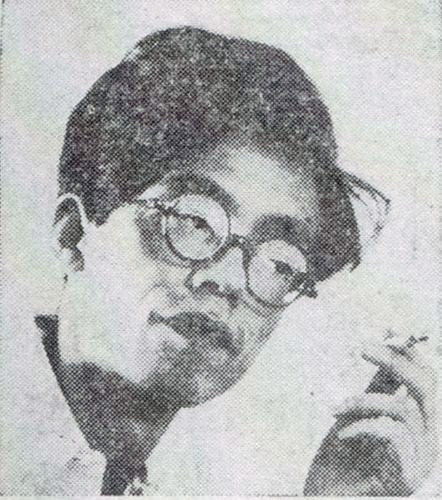
Yamada in 1964

Seiya Yamada (山田 誠也, Yamada Seiya; January 4, 1922 – July 28, 2001), known by his pen name Futaro Yamada (山田 風太郎, Yamada Fūtarō), was a Japanese author. He was born in Yabu, Hyogo. In 1947, he wrote a mystery short story Daruma-tōge no Jiken (達磨峠の事件; lit. "The Incident on Dharma Pass") and was awarded a prize by the magazine Houseki (宝石). He was discovered by Edogawa Rampo and became a novelist. He wrote many ninja (忍法帖 Ninpōchō series) and mystery stories. Many of his works have been adapted for film, TV, manga, and anime.

== Works in English translation ==
=== Novels ===
- The Kouga Ninja Scrolls (original title: 甲賀忍法帖, Kōga Ninpōchō), translation Geoff Sant (Del Rey, 2006)
- The Meiji Guillotine Murders (original title: 明治断頭台, Meiji Dantōdai, 1979), translation Bryan Karetnyk (Pushkin Press, 2023)

=== Short story ===
- "The Yellow Lodger" (original title: 黄色い下宿人 Kiiroi Geshukunin, 1957) translation by Kyoko Omori published in Old Crimes, New Scenes: A Century of Innovations in Japanese Mystery Fiction, Ed. Charles Exley and Michael Stone Tangeman (MerwinAsia, 2018). ISBN 9781937385347

== Awards ==
- 1949, the 2nd Detective Story Writers' Club Award
- 1997, the 45th Kikuchi Kan Prize
- 2000, the 4th Japan Mystery Award
- 2004, the Kodansha Manga Award for general manga for Basilisk, the manga adaptation of The Kouga Ninja Scrolls

== Selected works ==
=== Ninja stories (Ninpōchō series) ===
- The Kouga Ninja Scrolls (甲賀忍法帖, Kōga Ninpōchō; 1959) - adapted to film in 2005, to manga in 1963 and two times in 2003, and to anime in 2005 (based on one of the 2003 manga).
- Edo Ninpōchō (江戸忍法帖; 1960) - adapted to film in 1963, and as a TV series in 1966.
- Gunkan Ninpōchō (軍艦忍法帖; 1961)
- Kunoichi Ninpōchō (くノ一忍法帖; 1961) - adapted to film twice: in 1964 (as Kunoichi Ninpō) and in 1991.
- Gedō Ninpōchō (外道忍法帖; 1962) - adapted to film twice: in 1964 (as Kunoichi Keshō) and in 1992.
- Ninja Tsukikageshō (忍者月影抄; 1962) - adapted to film in 1963, 1996, and 2011.
- Ninpō-chūshingura (忍法忠臣蔵; 1962) - adapted to film in 1965, in 1983 (TV), and in 1994.
- Iga Ninpōchō (伊賀忍法帖; 1964) - adapted to film in 1982 (as Ninja Wars) and to manga in 2004.
- Ninpō Hakkenden (忍法八犬伝; 1964)
- Fūrai Ninpōchō (風来忍法帖; 1964) - adapted to film in 1965 and in 1968.
- Yagyū Ninpōchō (柳生忍法帖; 1964) Yagyū Jūbei trilogy #1 - adapted to film in 1998 and to manga in 2005.
- Ninpō Sōden 73 (忍法相伝73; 1965) - adapted to film in 1969.
- Jiraiya Ninpōchō (自来也忍法帖; 1965) - adapted to film in 1995.
- Maten Ninpōchō (魔天忍法帖; 1965)
- Shingen Ninpōchō (信玄忍法帖; 1967)
- Makai Tenshō (魔界転生; 1967) Yagyū Jūbei trilogy #2 (serialized as Oboro Ninpōchō) - adapted to film in 1981, 1996 and 2003, to anime in 1997 and to various manga.
- Shinobi no Manji (忍びの卍; 1967) - adapted to film in 1968.
- Ninpō Kenshiden (忍法剣士伝; 1968)
- Ginga Ninpōchō (銀河忍法帖; 1968)
- Higisho Sōdatsu (秘戯書争奪; 1968) - adapted to film in 1993.
- Ninpō Fūin Ima Yaburu (忍法封印いま破る; 1969)
- Ninja Kokubyaku Zōshi (忍者黒白草紙; 1969)
- Ninpō Sōtō no Washi (忍法双頭の鷲; 1969) - adapted to TV in 2018.
- Musashi Ninpō Tabi (武蔵忍法旅; 1970)
- Uminari Ninpōchō (海鳴り忍法帖; 1971)
- Ninpō Sōsei-ki (忍法創世記; 2001)

=== Other fiction ===
- Ganchū no Akuma (眼中の悪魔; 1948)
- Kyozō Inraku (虚像淫楽; 1948) - adapted to manga in 1978.
- Akuryō no Mure (悪霊の群; 1955) with Akimitsu Takagi - adapted to film in 1956.
- Jūsankaku Kankei (十三角関係; 1956)
- Idaten Hyakuri (いだ天百里; 1957) - adapted to manga in 2006.
- Onna Rō Hishō (おんな牢秘抄; 1960) - adapted to TV series in 1972, TV movie in 1983, V-cinema film in 1995, and to manga in 2006.
- Hitsugi no Naka no Etsuraku (棺の中の悦楽; 1962) - adapted to film in 1965.
- Taiyō Kokuten (太陽黒点; 1963)
- Keishichō Sōshi (警視庁草紙; 1975) - adapted to TV series in 2001.
- Gentō Tsujibasha (幻燈辻馬車; 1976)
- The Meiji Guillotine Murders (警視庁草紙 —風太郎明治劇場—, Keishichō Sōshi —Fūtarō Meiji Gekijō—; 1979)
- Basara (婆沙羅; 1990)
- Yagyū Jūbei Shisu (柳生十兵衛死す; 1992) Yagyū Jūbei trilogy #3 - adapted to manga in 2000.
