= Nenji Kobayashi =

Japanese actor (born 1941)

- 小林 稔侍
- Born: February 7, 1941 (age 84); Katsuragi, Wakayama, Japan
- Occupation: Actor
- Years active: 1962–present

Nenji Kobayashi (小林 稔侍, Kobayashi Nenji; born February 7, 1941) is a Japanese actor. He won the award for best supporting actor at the 23rd Japan Academy Prize for Poppoya.

Kobayashi signed with Toei in 1961 and started his acting career with small roles.

== Filmography ==
=== Film ===
- Soshiki Bōryoku (1967)
- Female Prisoner 701: Scorpion (1971)
- Street Mobster (1972)
- Outlaw Killers: Three Mad Dog Brothers (1972)
- New Battles Without Honor and Humanity: The Boss's Head (1975) as Shimura
- The Bullet Train (1975) as Morimoto
- Karate Warriors (1976) as Higashida
- The Classroom of Terror (1976) as Fumio Odagiri
- Yakuza Graveyard (1976) as Akira Kitajima
- The Doberman Cop (1977) as Katsuo Koyama
- Hokuriku Proxy War (1977)
- Message from Space (1978) as Fox
- Shogun's Samurai (1978)
- Nihon no Fixer (1979) as Shunsuke Mizumaki
- Virus (1980)
- The Gate of Youth (1981)
- Eijanaika (1981) as Matakichi
- Station (1981) as Tatsumi
- The Gate of Youth: Part 2 (1982)
- Theater of Life (1983) as Terakane
- The Ballad of Narayama (1983) as Tsune
- Shōsetsu Yoshida Gakkō (1983), Eiichi Nishimura
- The Geisha (1983)
- The Go Masters (1983) as Takii
- Izakaya Chōji (1983) as Ozeki
- Seburi monogatari (1985)
- The Burmese Harp (1985)
- Lonely Heart (1985)
- Chōchin (1987)
- Umi e, See You (1988)
- 47 Ronin (1994) as Shindo Genshiro
- Poppoya (1999)
- The Twilight Samurai (2002)
- Café Lumière (2003)
- The Hidden Blade (2004)
- About Her Brother (2010)
- It All Began When I Met You (2013)
- Dangerous Cops: Final 5 Days (2016)
- Hoshi Megumino Machi (2018) (first leading role in a film)
- Impossibility Defense (2018)
- Tora-san, Wish You Were Here (2019)
- Labyrinth of Cinema (2020)
- It's a Flickering Life (2021)
- Tokyo Taxi (2025)

=== Television ===
- Captain Ultra (1967)
- Giant Robo (1967) as Terroman (Episode 26)
- Pro Hunter (1981)
- Hanekonma (1986) as Hiroshi (Hanekonma's father)
- Furuhata Ninzaburō (1994) (Episode 7)
- Hachidai Shōgun Yoshimune (1995 as, Kanō Hisamichi
- Oda Nobunaga: Tenka wo Totta Baka (1998) as Hirate Masahide
- Tax Inspector Madogiwa Taro (1998-)
- Aoi (2000) as Katagiri Katsumoto
- Yoshitsune (2005) as Hōjō Tokimasa
- Byakkotai (2007) as Saigō Tanomo
- Detective Tokunosuke Jinbo (2007–2017)
- Shiroi Kyotō (2019)
