= The Threat (1966 film) =

1966 Japanese crime film

- Theatrical release poster
- Japanese: 脅迫 おどし
- Directed by: Kinji Fukasaku
- Screenplay by: Kinji Fukasaku; Ichirō Miyagawa
- Produced by: Tōru Akita
- Starring: Rentarō Mikuni; Kō Nishimura; Hideo Murota; Masumi Harukawa
- Cinematography: Yoshikazu Yamazawa
- Music by: Isao Tomita
- Production company: Toei Tokyo
- Distributed by: Toei Company
- Release date: February 17, 1966
- Running time: 84 minutes
- Country: Japan
- Language: Japanese

The Threat (Japanese: 脅迫(おどし), Hepburn: Odoshi) is a 1966 Japanese black-and-white crime thriller film directed by Kinji Fukasaku.

== Plot ==
Death row convicts Kawanishi and Sabu escape from prison and kidnap the grandson of cancer authority Dr. Sakata. They break into the house of Mr. Misawa and take his family hostage, forcing him to be their go-between to collect the ransom.

== Cast ==
- Rentarō Mikuni as Misawa
- Kō Nishimura as Kawanishi
- Masumi Harukawa as Hiroko
- Hideo Murota as Sabu
- Sanae Nakahara as Mother of the baby
- Ken Mitsuda as Sakata
- Ryōhei Uchida as Man in a Raincoat
- Pepe Hozumi as Masao
- Shōichi Ozawa as a Police officer
- Kunie Tanaka as a Police officer

== Production and release ==
The Threat was shot in black and white with mono sound. It was produced by Toei Tokyo and distributed by Toei Company. It was released in Japan on February 17, 1966.

The film was released on Blu-ray with English subtitles in the United Kingdom and United States by Arrow Video on September 24, 2024.

== Reception ==
Sarah Morgan of On: Yorkshire Magazine called The Threat a gripping crime thriller "that immediately grabs you by the throat and doesn't let go until the closing credits have rolled" and gave it a 7.8 out of 10 rating. Despite writing that the plot develops as one would expect, she found the film to have plenty of unforeseen twists and turns and said Fukasaku directs with such skill that viewers will be on the edge of their seats throughout. Morgan also had strong praise for Yoshikazu Yamazawa's cinematography. In a four out of five star review for Slant Magazine, Derek Smith wrote that Fukasaku's The Threat provides "an essential glimpse into the early work of a genre master already fully in control of his craft."
