= Summer Soldiers =

- Film poster
- サマー・ソルジャー
- Directed by: Hiroshi Teshigahara
- Written by: John Nathan
- Produced by: Yukio Tomizawa
- Starring: Keith Sykes; Reisen Ri; Kazuo Kitamura; Toshiko Kobayashi
- Cinematography: Hiroshi Teshigahara
- Edited by: Fusako Shuzui
- Music by: Toru Takemitsu
- Production company: Teshigahara Productions
- Release date: March 25, 1972 (Japan)
- Running time: 103/129 minutes (Note: The Time Out magazine review lists the film's running time with 103 minutes, which complies with the running time of the Japanese DVD release. 129 minutes is the length given by Kinenote and the Japanese Movie Database.)
- Languages: Japanese, English

Summer Soldiers (Japanese: サマー・ソルジャー, Hepburn: Samā sorujā) is a 1972 Japanese drama and anti-war film written by John Nathan and directed by Hiroshi Teshigahara. It follows U.S. army deserter Jim who tries to seek refuge in Japan during the Vietnam War.

== Plot ==
G.I. Jim has deserted from the U.S. Army and is seeking refuge in Japan. While he constantly changes his hide-outs, Jim, who does not speak the language, is confronted with cultural differences, meeting average Japanese people, political radicals who want to use him for their purposes, and other deserters.

== Cast ==
- Keith Sykes as Jim
- Reisen Ri as Reiko
- Kazuo Kitamura as Tachikawa
- Toshiko Kobayashi as Mrs. Tachikawa
- Shōichi Ozawa as Tanikawa
- Tetsuko Kuroyanagi as Mrs. Tanikawa
- Teruko Kishi as Mother
- Hideo Kanze as Shimezu
- Hisashi Igawa as Ota
- Kunie Tanaka as Fujimura
- Takeshi Katō as Driver
- Greg Antonacci as Miguel
- Barry Cotton as Daryl
- John Nathan as Pete

== Production and release ==
Summer Soldiers was Teshigahara's first feature film in four years, producing a script by American writer and translator John Nathan. It was the first time that director Teshigahara photographed one of his films himself. Summer Soldiers also marks the only time that Teshigahara's wife, actress Toshiko Kobayashi, starred in one of his films.

The film premiered in Japan in March 1972 and was shown at the Cannes Film Festival in May and the New York Film Festival in October that year.

In 2002, Summer Soldiers was included in the DVD collection Teshigahara Hiroshi no sekai ("The world of Hiroshi Teshigahara").

== Reception ==
After its New York Film Festival screening, Vincent Canby of The New York Times described Summer Soldiers as "an intelligent, level-headed movie that refuses—bravely, I think—to deal in the sort of hysteria that denies the intention of other antiwar films". Tony Rayns, writing for Time Out magazine, was critical of the script's "over-schematisation", but pointed out the film's strengths which he found in "a rigorous honesty about the psychology of desertion, a complete absence of sentimentality, and a meticulous naturalism in the settings and incidental details".

In his compendium on Japanese film directors, film scholar Alexander Jacoby argued that Summer Soldiers "replaced the stylistic flamboyance of Teshigahara's sixties films with an informal, improvisational approach influenced by such independent filmmakers as John Cassavetes and Bob Rafelson".
