= Stakeout (1958 film) =

1958 Japanese film

- 張込み
- Directed by: Yoshitarō Nomura
- Written by: Shinobu Hashimoto
- Based on: "Harikomi" by Seicho Matsumoto
- Produced by: Takeshi Ogura
- Starring: Seiji Miyaguchi; Hideko Takamine; Minoru Ōki
- Cinematography: Seiji Inoue
- Edited by: Yoshiyasu Hamamura
- Music by: Toshirō Mayuzumi
- Production company: Shochiku
- Distributed by: Shochiku
- Release date: 15 January 1958 (Japan)
- Running time: 116 minutes
- Country: Japan
- Language: Japanese

Stakeout (張込み, Harikomi) is a 1958 Japanese drama and crime film directed by Yoshitarō Nomura, based on a short story by Seicho Matsumoto of the same name.

== Plot ==
After the murder of a pawnbroker, Tokyo detectives Shimooka and Yuki are sent to Kyushu, home of murder suspect Ishii's former girlfriend, Sadako, as the police expect Ishii to make contact with her. While observing her house, Yuki starts to sympathise with Sadako, who has an unhappy marriage with a mean and domineering bank executive.

When Ishii finally meets with Sadako, Ishii tells her that he wanted to see her but cannot stay. Both regret abandoning their love. They agree to go away together. The police arrest Ishii, leaving behind a grieving Sadako. As Shimooka and Yuki prepare to return to Tokyo with Ishii, Yuki writes a telegram to his girlfriend Yumiko, promising to marry her.

== Cast ==
- Seiji Miyaguchi as Shimooka
- Minoru Ōki as Yuki
- Hideko Takamine as Sadako
- Takahiro Tamura as Ishii
- Hizuru Takachiho as Yumiko
- Kin Sugai as Mrs. Shimooka
- Kumeko Urabe as landlady
- Ryōhei Uchida as Yamada
- Kamatari Fujiwara as Yumiko's father
- Tomoko Fumino as Yumiko's mother
- Miki Odagiri as maid
- Kazuko Yamamoto as maid
- Masao Shimizu as Sadako's husband

== Awards ==
1958 Kinema Junpo Award, Blue Ribbon Award and Mainichi Film Award for Best Screenplay (Shinobu Hashimoto).

== Legacy ==
Matsumoto's short story was repeatedly adapted for television in later years. Some of these adaptations stayed closer to the original story, which has only one detective, Yuki, observe Sadako, while others took over Hashimoto's idea to present two detectives.
