= Sō Kuramoto =

Japanese playwright and screenwriter (1935–2026)

Kaoru Yamaya (山谷 馨; December 21, 1934 – September 18, 2026), better known by his pen name Sō Kuramoto (倉本 聰), was a Japanese playwright and screenwriter.

== Life and career ==
Sō Kuramoto was born in Tokyo on December 21, 1934. He attended Azabu High School and studied aesthetics at Tokyo University. He then found work at Nippon Broadcasting System (NBS). While an employee there, he also began submitting scripts for NBS radio programs under the pen name Sō Kuramoto, keeping his identity a secret from his employers. In 1963 he left NBS and began working as a freelancer. He had troubles around NHK's teleplay Katsu Kaishū and moved to Hokkaido. After staying in Sapporo, he moved to Furano in 1977. In 1984 he established Furano Juku, a school for script-writers and actors.

Hirokazu Kore-eda stated that in 1970s Japan, the top three TV scriptwriters were Kuniko Mukōda, Taichi Yamada, and Kuramoto.

Kuramoto died from multiple organ failure on September 18, 2026, at the age of 91.

== Works ==
=== Television ===
- Katsu Kaishū (1974)
- Zenryaku Ofukurosama (1975)
- Daitokai Season1 (1976)
- Haguregumo (1978)
- Kita no Kuni Kara (1981–2002)
- Yasuragi no Sato (2018-19)
- Yasuragi no Toki: Michi (2019-20)

=== Film ===
- Kunoichi Ninpō (1964)
- Kunoichi Keshō (1964)
- Blue Christmas (1978)
- Fuyu no Hana (1978)
- Station (1981)
- Lanterns on Blue Waters (1983)
- Tokei – Adieu l'hiver (1986)
- Umi e, See You (1988)
- Silence of the Sea (2024)
