= The Gate of Youth (1975 film) =

1975 Japanese film

- Theatrical poster
- Directed by: Kirio Urayama
- Written by: Akira Hayasaka; Kirio Urayama
- Based on: The Gate of Youth by Hiroyuki Itsuki
- Produced by: Sanezumi Fujimoto; Tokuko Miyako; Hiroshi Hariu
- Starring: Ken Tanaka; Tatsuya Nakadai; Sayuri Yoshinaga; Shinobu Otake
- Narrated by: Shoichi Ozawa
- Cinematography: Hiroshi Murai
- Edited by: Nobuo Ogawa
- Music by: Riichirō Manabe
- Production company: Toho
- Distributed by: Toho
- Release date: February 15, 1975 (Japan)
- Running time: 188 minutes
- Country: Japan
- Language: Japanese
- Box office: ¥548 million

The Gate of Youth (Japanese: 青春の門, Hepburn: Seishun no mon) is a 1975 Japanese drama film directed by Kirio Urayama from a story by Hiroyuki Itsuki. A direct sequel titled Seishun no mon: Jiritsu hen (青春の門: 自立篇, transl. The Gate of Youth: Part 2), also directed by Urayama, was released in 1977.

== Premise ==
Mainly the story of Shinsuke and his stepmother, ranging from Shinsuke's infancy to his mid-teens. Coal workers and the Chikuo mines dominate nearly every aspect of the life of the characters. Shinsuke's father dies while bravely using dynamite to rescue a group of trapped Korean miners. Shinsuke must then grow up without a father in a world of poverty.

== Cast ==
- Ken Tanaka as Shinsuke Ibuki (teenager)
  - Tomohiro Tanabe as Shinsuke (aged 10)
  - Ken Matsuda as Shinsuke (aged 6)
  - Haruhiko Urayama as Shinsuke (aged 3)
- Tatsuya Nakadai as Juzo Ibuki, Shinsuke's father
- Sayuri Yoshinaga as Tae Ibuki, Shinsuke's stepmother
- Shinobu Otake as Orie Maki (teenager)
  - Rie Yamazaki as Orie Maki (child)
- Toshie Kobayashi as Seki
- Jūkei Fujioka as Miner Kijima
- Takuya Fujioka as Coal mine owner
- Akira Kobayashi as Ryugoro Hanawa
- Masumi Harukawa as Geisha
- Kazunaga Tsuji as Nagata
- Susumu Fujita as Yabe Tora
- Mancho Tsuji as Chota
- Keiko Takahashi as Azusa Hatae, Shinsuke's music teacher
- Chôichirô Kawarasaki as Kanayama Shuretsu
- Hisashi Igawa as Park
- Takeshi Katō as Professor Hayatake Senjo
- Fujioka Shigeki as Kojima Labor
- Shoichi Ozawa as Heikichi/Narrator
- Kazuhiko Sugizaki as Lee Gau Nam
- Haruhiko Tagawa
- Koichi Yamazaki
- Jun Hamamura as Foreman
- Mitsuyo Inomata
- Akira Muto as Boss
- Keiko Maezaki
- Toki Shiozawa as Princess of Cafe
- Mamoru Narumatsu as Fuku-san
- Yuko Tazawa
- Hyoemon Hirosawa as Minstrel
- Tamami Urayama
- Kôji Uruki as Korean
- Gorô Hanamaki
- Hiro Kasai
- Takashi Kanematsu
- Mitsunobou Fujikawa
- Atsuko Ami
- Yasuko Agawa
- Zan Fujita as Haruo

== Production ==
Author Itsuki and director Urayama had disagreements over the casting and plot of the first adaptation of Itsuki's series. For instance, Itsuki originally opposed the casting of Keiko Takahashi as Azusa, though he changed his mind after meeting her.

== Release ==
Despite these creative differences, The Gate of Youth made ¥548 million, making it the fifth highest-grossing film at the Japanese box office in 1975.

A sequel titled Seishun no mon: Jiritsu hen (lit. The Gate of Youth: Part 2) was released in 1977. Though that installment was also a success, the disagreements between director and author grew too big to overcome, and a planned third installment was scrapped. Itsuki then took the series to Toei, where it was remade in 1981.
