= Kunoichi Ninpō =

- DVD cover
- Directed by: Sadao Nakajima
- Screenplay by: Sō Kuramoto; Sadao Nakajima
- Based on: Kunoichi Ninpō by Futaro Yamada
- Starring: Mari Yoshimura; Sanae Nakahara; Yumiko Nogawa; Shingo Yamashiro; Shoichi Ozawa; Shigeru Tsuyuguchi
- Music by: Hajime Kaburagi
- Distributed by: Toei Company
- Release date: October 3, 1964 (Japan)
- Running time: 87 minutes
- Country: Japan
- Language: Japanese

Kunoichi Ninpō (Japanese: くノ一忍法), also known as Female Ninja Magic, is a 1964 Japanese erotic film directed by Sadao Nakajima in his directorial debut. It is based on Futaro Yamada's novel Kunoichi Ninpōchō.

== Plot ==
In the Siege of Osaka, five female ninjas who pregnanted with Toyotomi Hideyori's children escape from Osaka Castle by the order of Sanada Yukimura. Tokugawa Ieyasu orders Hattori Hanzō to assassinate them all. On the other hand, Senhime raises her hand against Ieyasu and tries to protect them.

== Cast ==
- Omayu - Mari Yoshimura
- Senhime - Yumiko Nogawa
- Oyui - Sanae Nakahara
- Oyu - Yuriko Mishima
- Hannyadera Fuhaku - Yoshio Yoshida
- Amamaki - Shingo Yamashiro
- Usuzumi - Shoichi Ozawa
- Stebei - Kyosuke Machida
- Hayato - Minoru Ōki
- Tokugawa Ieyasu - Miechō Soganoya
- Sanada Yukimura - Eizō KItamura
- Lady Kasuga - Michiyo Kogure
- Hattori Hanzō - Ryūji Shinagawa
- Sakazaki Dewanokami - Shigeru Tsuyuguchi

== See also ==
- Kunoichi Keshō - second in Kunoichi film series. Also directed by Sadao Nakajima.
- Ninpō-chūshingura - third in Kunoichi film series. Directed by Yasuto Hasegawa.
