= Fukurō no Shiro =

1959 novel by Ryōtarō Shiba

Fukurō No Shiro
- First edition cover
- Author: Ryōtarō Shiba
- Publication date: 1959

Fukurō no Shiro (梟の城, Owls' Castle) is the ninja-themed 1959 debut novel of Japanese author Ryōtarō Shiba, which won him the Naoki Prize in 1960 after the story was published by Kodansha. It has been adapted into a 3-part "Naoki Award Series" TV broadcast on the Fuji Television Network in 1960, and into two jidaigeki-genre films, Castle of Owls in 1963 and Owls' Castle in 1999.

== Film adaptations ==
=== Castle of Owls ===
Castle of Owls (忍者秘帖・梟の城, Ninja Hichō Fukuro no Shiro), literally "Owls' Castle Ninja Secret Handbook", also known as Samurai Spies (not to be confused with the unrelated film Samurai Spy), is a 1963 Japanese adaptation directed by Eiichi Kudō. It starred Ryūtarō Ōtomo in the lead role.

==== Cast ====
- Ryūtarō Ōtomo as Juzo
- Minoru Ōki as Gohei
- Hizuru Takachiho as Kohagi
- Chiyoko Honma as Kizaru
- Choichiro Kawarazaki as Kumotaro
- Kantarō Suga as Maeda Geni

=== Owls' Castle ===
Owls' Castle (梟の城, Fukurō no Shiro) is a 1999 Japanese adaptation directed by Masahiro Shinoda starring Kiichi Nakai.

== See also ==
- Kaze no Bushi
- Kunitori Monogatari Taiga drama : Shigeru Tsuyuguchi played Tsuzura Juzō
