= Minoru Ōki =

Japanese actor (1927–2009)

- Born: 16 December 1923; Sakai, Osaka Prefecture Japan
- Died: 30 March 2009 (aged 85)
- Occupation: Actor
- Years active: 1951–2006

Minoru Ōki (大木 実, Ōki Minoru; 16 December 1927 – 30 March 2009) was a Japanese actor. His notable film appearances were Lone Wolf and Cub films, Stakeout, and Not Forgotten.

Ōki started working as a shooting assistant at the Nikkatsu Tamagawa studio at the age of 16. In 1951, he made his film debut with Aa Seishun at Shin Saburi and Michiyo Kogure's recommendation. In the same year, he officially signed his contract with Shochiku film company and became an actor. In 1963, he left Shochiku and transferred to Toei. In Toei, he mainly appeared in yakuza films.

In 2000, he won the best actor award at the Three Continents Film Festival for his role in Not Forgotten. He died of pancreatic cancer in 2006.

== Selected filmography ==
=== Films ===
- The Inposter (1952)
- Somewhere Beneath The Sky (1954)
- Lady and Rowdies (1955)
- I Will Buy You a.k.a. Anata Kaimasu (1956) as Goro Kurita
- The Gion Tempest (1958)
- Stakeout (1958)
- The Guitarist and the Rancher (1960)
- Chūshingura: Hana no Maki, Yuki no Maki (1962) as Toda
- Fukurō no Shiro (1963) as Gohei
- Tokyo-Hong Kong, Gangsters (1964)
- The Great Duel (1964)
- Kunoichi ninpō (1964) as Hayato
- Kaze no Bushi (1964)
- Kamikaze Man: Duel at Noon (1966) as Kitazawa
- Ninpō-chūshingura (1966) as Ōishi Kuranosuke
- The Chivalrous Life (1967) as Koike
- The Valiant Red Peony (1968) as Gōzō Kakui
- Horrors of Malformed Men (1969)
- Yakuza's Law: Yakuza Keibatsushi: Rinchi (1969)
- Lone Wolf and Cub: Baby Cart at the River Styx (1972)
- Lone Wolf and Cub: White Heaven in Hell (1974) as Yagyū Retsudō
- Lone Wolf and Cub: Baby Cart in the Land of Demons (1973) as Yagyū Retsudō
- The Originator of Kamikaze (1974)
- Gokuaku Kenpō (1974) as Kuroda
- Fossilized Wilderness (1982)
- Not Forgotten a.k.a. Wasurerarenu Hitobito (2000)
- Gokudō no Tsumatachi Jōen (2005)

=== Television ===
- Oshizamurai Kiichihōgan (1973–74) (ep.12, 25 and 26)
- Ronin of the Wilderness (1974) (2nd season ep.1)
- Hissatsu Shiokiya Kagyō (1975) (ep.11) as Saheiji
- Shin Hissatsu Shiokinin (1977) (ep.12 and 28)
- The Unfettered Shogun (1978) (ep.35) as Sagimiya Rihei
- The Yagyu Conspiracy (1979) (ep.25) as Araki Mataemon
- Hissatsu Shigotonin (1980) (ep.65) as Deikichi
- Sanga Moyu (1984) as Imoto Torazō
- Dokuganryū Masamune (1987) as Maeda Toshiie
- Choshichiro Edo Nikki (1988) (ep.18) as Matsudaira Morichika
- Onihei Hankachō (1997) (4th season ep.4) as Sōhachi
- Hōjō Tlokimune (2000) as Saionji Saneuji
