= Kō Nishimura =

Japanese actor (1923–1997)

- 西村 晃
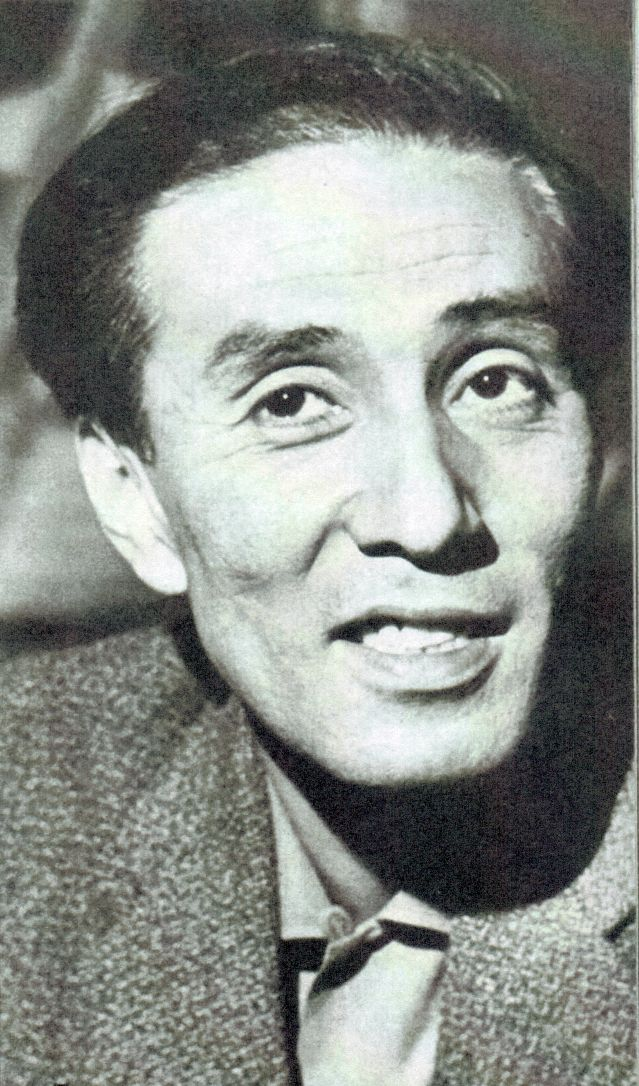
- Born: January 25, 1923; Sapporo, Hokkaido, Japan
- Died: April 15, 1997 (aged 74); Kokubunji, Tokyo, Japan
- Other name: Akira Nishimura
- Occupation: Actor
- Years active: 1946–1997

Kō Nishimura (西村 晃, Nishimura Kō; 25 January 1923 – 15 April 1997) was a Japanese actor.

Known in the West primarily for supporting roles in such films as Akira Kurosawa's The Bad Sleep Well and Yojimbo, Kihachi Okamoto's Sword of Doom, Yoshitaro Nomura's Zero Focus, and Kon Ichikawa's The Burmese Harp, Nishimura also played leading roles throughout his career. He is sometimes known as Akira Nishimura, as the kanji character 晃 can be translated as either Akira or Kō.

The son of biologist and inventor Makoto Nishimura, Nishimura made his film debut in the Shin Saburi film Fusetsu Nijyunen in 1951. He won the Blue Ribbon Awards for best supporting actor in 1964 for Unholy Desire directed by Shohei Imamura. In 1982, he won the Best Actor award in the Mainichi Film Awards for his performance in Matagi.

In Japan, Nishimura is well known for playing the role of the title character in the long-running television jidaigeki series Mito Kōmon from 1983 to 1992. He also portrayed the voice of the "Mamo/Howard Lockewood" in the original Japanese version of anime film The Mystery of Mamo in 1978.

In July 2019, Tokyo's Cinemavera Shibuya honored him with a film festival celebrating both Nishimura and Yūnosuke Itō, another popular character actor who attained high status in Japan's entertainment industry.

== Filmography ==
=== Films ===
- The Burmese Harp (1956)
- Sun in the Last Days of the Shogunate (1957)
- Umi no Yarōdomo (1957) as Mekkachi
- Arashi no naka o tsuppashire (1958)
- The Ballad of Narayama (1958)
- Kurenai no Tsubasa (1958) as Mizutani Tetsuji
- Ballad of the Cart (1959)
- The Bad Sleep Well (1960)
- Mutekiga Ore o Yondeiru (1960)
- Zero Focus (1961)
- Yojimbo (1961)
- Burari Bura-bura Monogatari (1962)
- Gorath (1962) as Murata, Minister of Space
- High and Low (1963)
- Rickshaw Man (1963 version)
- Bushido, Samurai Saga (1963)
- Attack Squadron! (1963)
- Unholy Desire (1964)
- Kunoichi Keshō (1964)
- Sleepy Eyes of Death 5: Sword of Fire (1965)
- Ninpō-chushingura (1965)
- House of Terrors (1965) as the Hunchback
- The Threat (1966) as Kawanishi
- The Sword of Doom (1966) as Shichibei
- The Dancing Girl of Izu (1967 Toho version)
- Zatoichi the Outlaw (1967)
- Black Lizard (1968)
- The Living Skeleton (1968)
- Black Rose Mansion (1969)
- The Wild Sea (1969)
- Zatoichi Goes to the Fire Festival (1970)
- Men and War Part II (1971)
- Hanzo the Razor: Sword of Justice (1972)
- Lady Snowblood (1973)
- Tsugaru Folk Song (1973)
- Hanzo the Razor: The Snare (1973)
- Karei-naru Ichizoku (1974)
- Hanzo the Razor: Who's Got the Gold (1974)
- New Battles Without Honor and Humanity: The Boss's Head (1975)
- Manhunt (1976)
- Hokuriku Proxy War (1977) as Mr. Yasuhara
- The Incident (1978)
- Ogin-sama (1978)
- The Strangling (1979)
- Nomugi Pass (1979)
- Matagi (1982) as Heizo Sekiguchi
- Theater of Life (1983) as Kokin
- Tokyo: The Last Megalopolis (1988) as Makoto Nishimura
- 47 Ronin (1994) as Kira Yoshinaka

=== TV series ===
- Taiga drama series
  - Hana no Shōgai (1963) as Tada Ichiro
  - Akō Rōshi (1964) as Aizawa Shinbei
  - San Shimai (1967) as Ennma no Choji
  - Mominoki wa Nokotta (1970)
  - Haru no Sakamichi (1971) as Kawai Jinzaemon
  - Kunitori Monogatari (1973) as Hamura Shoha
  - Kaze to Kumo to Niji to (1976) as Minamoto no Mamoru
  - Homura Tatsu (1993) as Kichiji
- Mito Kōmon as Tokugawa Mitsukuni of season 14 to 21 (1983–1992)
- Lone Wolf and Cub (Yorozuya Kinnosuke version, 1974) as Yagyū Retsudō
- Tōyama no Kin-san (1975 version)
- Momotarō-zamurai (1976)
- Ōedo Sōsamō (season 4, 1976)
- Umi wa Yomigaeru (1977) as Itō Hirobumi
- Naruto Hichō (1977) as Yoami
- Shiroi Kyotō (1978) as Kyosuke Takemura
- Akō Rōshi (1979) as Onodera Jyunai
- Fumō Chitai (1979)
- Sarutobi Sasuke (1980) as Tokugawa Ieyasu
- Dai Chūshingura (1980) as Kira Yoshinaka
- Miyamoto Musashi (1984) as Yagyū Sekishūsai
- The Men Who Made Ultraman (1989) as Eiji Tsuburaya
- Daichi no Ko (1995)

=== Voice acting ===
- Lupin III: The Mystery of Mamo (1978) as Mamo/Howard Lockewood
- Nutcracker Fantasy (1979) as Uncle Drosselmeyer, Puppeteer, Street Singer, Watchmaker

=== Dubbing ===
- Serpico (1977 TV Asahi edition) as Captain McClain (Biff McGuire)

=== Other ===
- Quiz Derby

== Honours ==
- Medal with Purple Ribbon (1987)
- Order of the Rising Sun, 4th Class, Gold Rays with Rosette (1994)
