= Ryōhei Uchida (actor) =

Japanese actor (1924–1984)

- Born: 5 February 1924; Chōshi, Chiba Prefecture, Japan
- Died: 15 June 1984 (aged 60)
- Occupation: Actor
- Years active: 1950–1984

Ryōhei Uchida (内田良平, Uchida Ryōhei; 5 February 1924 – 15 June 1984) was a Japanese actor. Uchida appeared in nearly 300 films between 1950 and 1984. He specialized in playing villains and yakuza roles.

He got acquainted with film director Masaki Kobayashi through a friend's introduction. He was able to sign his contract with Shochiku film company with the help of Kobayashi. In 1953, he made his film debut with Kabe Atsukiheya directed by Masaki Kobayashi. His first starring role in a film was playing Kazama in League of Gangsters (1963) directed by Kinji Fukasaku.

He died of myocardial infarction on 15 June 1984 at the age of 60.

== Filmography ==
=== Films ===
- Kabe Atsukiheya (1953) as Brother of Yokota
- Somewhere Under The Broad Sky (1954) as Shinkichi
- Fountainhead (1956) as Komine
- Anata Kaimasu (1957) as Newspaper reporter A
- Stakeout (1958) as Yamada
- The Human Condition Road to Eternity (1958) as Hashiya
- Take Aim at the Police Van (1960) as Kuji
- Mutekiga Ore o Yondeiru (1960) as Watanabe
- Killers on Parade (1961)
- League of Gangsters (1963) as Kazama
- 13 Assassins (1963) as Hanbei Onigashira
- Gang 9, Tokyo Gang versus Hong Kong Gang (1964) as Chan
- The Threat (1966)
- Moeyo Ken (1966) as Kennosuke Hichiri
- Heitai Yakuza Ore ni Makasero (1967) as Nakazawa
- Soshiki Bōryoku (1967) as Teramachi
- Outlaw:Heartless (1968) as Tetsu Aira
- Blackmail Is My Life (1968) as Kitō
- Higashi Shinakai (1969) as Katayama Kunigorō
- Black Rose Mansion (1969) as Kazama
- Daimon Otokode Shinitai (1969) as Fuse
- Japan Organized Crime Boss (1969) as Tsubaki
- Shinsengumi (1969) as Niimi Nishiki
- Stray Cat Rock: Wild Jumbo (1970) as Officer
- Yakuza Deka (1970) as Tetsuji Asai
- Blind Woman's Curse (1970) as Aozora
- A Man′s World (1971) as Tsuyushi Shiraishi
- Kantō Exile (1971) as Yusuke Sakashita
- A Lone Assassin Yakuza Wolf (1972) as Ishiguro
- Kage Gari (1972) as Sunlight
- Kage Gari Hoero Taihō (1972) as Sunlight
- Bohachi Bushido: Code of the Forgotten Eight (1973) as Kurosuki no Kokaku
- Karate Kiba (1973) as Eiji Takami
- The Explosion (1975) as Nishizawa
- The Youth Killer (1976) as Jun's Father
- Bandits vs. Samurai Squadron (1978) as Yomohichi Chiaki
- Ibara no Hyōteki (1980) as Keisuke Kadota
- Onimasa (1982) as Heizō Suenaga

=== Television drama ===
- Moeyo Ken (1966) as Hijikata Toshizō
- The Water Margin (1973) as Zhu Wu
- Taiyō ni Hoero! (1974) (ep.90) as Sakata
- Onihei Hankachō (1977) as Ōtaki no Gorozō
- Daitokai Season 3 (1978) (ep.1) as Keizo Miyoshi
- Tantei Monogatari (1979) (ep.15) as Tabata
