= Riona Hazuki =

Japanese actress (1975)

- 葉月 里緒奈
- Born: July 11, 1975 (age 51); Nakano, Tokyo, Japan
- Occupation: Actress
- Years active: 1993–present
- Spouses: Unknown (m. 2001; div. 2001) Unknown (m. 2004; div. 2015) Unknown (m. 2018)
- Children: 1

Riona Hazuki (葉月里緒奈 Hazuki Riona), born Mai Yamada (山田麻衣 Yamada Mai, born on July 11, 1975, in Tokyo, Japan), is a Japanese actress. In 1999, she played the main role in Owls' Castle.

== Biography ==
Hazuki was born as Mai Yamada in Nakano, Tokyo on July 11, 1975. From ages 10 to 17, she lived in Chicago where her family had moved due to her father’s job.

Hazuki made her debut as an actor in the 1993 television drama Oka no Ue no Himawari (The Sunflower on the Hill). Her first role in a movie was in 1995’s Sharaku - the movie in which she met and starred with Hiroyuki Sanada. Her final acting role was in the Television drama Deka fūfū 3 (Detective Husband and Wife 3) in 2017.

== Personal life ==
In 1995, it was reported that Hazuki had had an affair with married actor Hiroyuki Sanada, who she had co-starred with in the movie Sharaku (写楽). At the time, she was 19 years old, and Sanada was 35. Hazuki reportedly chased him to the Philippines where he was working. In an interview with the magazine Weekly Asahi, she reportedly said, "I don't mind if my partner has a wife." Sanada then divorced his wife, actress Satomi Tezuka. Hazuki was later labeled an "evil woman" and was heavily criticized by the public for her behavior.

In 2001, she had a surprise marriage to a sushi chef living in Hawaii, USA, but divorced after just two months. In 2004, she married again for the second time, to a real estate heir. She gave birth to her first child, a daughter, on November 7 of that year, she then got divorced in 2015, with her ex-husband taking custody of their daughter. In 2018, it was revealed by news outlets that she had married a third time, again to an executive at a major real estate developer.

== Selected filmography ==
=== Dramas ===
Year	Title	Role	Network	Notes
1993	Oka no Ue no Himawari	Nobue Yuzuhara	TBS	
1993	Mayonaka wo Kakenukeru	Risa Shimamoto	ABC	Lead role
1994	Southerns Call	Yoko Shimoji	NHK	
1994	Yume Miru Koro wo Sugitemo	Asuka Kurihara	TBS	
1995	Koi mo ni Dome Nara	Mayumi Okazaki	NTV	
1995	Last Love	Akari Hosaka	NHK	Lead role
1996	Kiseki no Romance	Makoto Suzuki	NTV	
1996	Mikeneko Holmes no Suiri	Harumi Katayama	TV Asahi	
1996	Hachigatsu no Love Song	Chika Domon	YTV	Lead role
1997	Mori Motonari	Kame	NHK	
1997	Eve	Saori Fujiwara	Fuji TV	
1997	Gift	Aoi	Fuji TV	Episode 7, guest role
1999	Koi no Kiseki	Taeko Tsukamoto	TV Asahi	Lead role
1999	The Doctor	Haruka Aoyama	TBS	
2000	Monalisa no Hohoemi	Chizuru Orihara	Fuji TV	
2003	Cosmetic	Sami Kitamura	WOWOW	Lead role
2004	Ranpo R	Yumiko Okawara	YTV	Episode 8, guest role
2004	Kareinaru Fukushū	Akiko Shinohara	TV Asahi	Lead role
2006	Aibou Season 4	Airi Kinosaki	TV Asahi	Episode 11, guest role
2006	Jikou Keisatsu	Satoko Akitsu	TV Asahi	Episode 7, guest role
2007	Hana Ikusa	Ayako	Fuji TV	
2008	Keiji no Genba	Mariko Sone	NHK	Episode 3, guest role
2008	Koori no Hana	Yukari Hamamura	TV Asahi	
2010	Tomehane! Suzuri Kōkō Shodōbu	Yuko Mochizuki	NHK	
2012	Tsuke mono gakusha Takenouchi Haruhiko	Natsuko Kuzunoha	TBS	
2013	Taxi Driver no Suiri Nisshi 32	Makoto Hayami	TV Asahi	Guest role
2013	Yamamura Misa Suspense: Akai Reikyūsha 32	Chizuru Nagi	Fuji TV	Guest role
2015	Shūgosin Bodyguard Shindo Teru 4	Maki Minami	TBS	Guest role
2015	Shuchakueki Series 29	Kyoko Yamano	TV Asahi	Guest role
2017	Deka Fūfū 3	Asami Mizuhashi	TBS	Guest role

=== Films ===
Year	Title	Role	Notes
1995	Sharaku	Hanazato	
1997	Parasite Eve	Kiyomi Nagashima	
1997	Mamushi no Kyōdai	Mika	
1998	Kuro no Tenshi Vol. 1	Ikko Amaoka	Lead role
1999	Owls' Castle	Kisaru	
2003	Spy Sorge	Hanako Miyake	
2006	Retribution	F18	
2010	BOX: The Hakamada Case	Kyoko Kumamoto	

=== Radio ===
- Riona Hazuki Venus Typhoon (1994−1995, JOLF)

== Discography ==
=== Albums ===
Year	Information	Oricon weeklypeak position	Sales	RIAJ certification
1995	Riona: Released: December 20, 1995; Label: Toshiba-EMI; Formats: CD, cassette	—		

=== Singles ===
Title	Date	Peak chart positions	Sales (JPN)	RIAJ certification	Album
Title	Date	JPNOricon	Sales (JPN)	RIAJ certification	Album
"Overture"		—			Riona
"Doin' the Doing"	May 25, 1994	—			Riona
"Yakusoku wa Shitaikedo"		—			Riona
"Hana no Kubikazari"		—			Riona
"Kimi ga Suki Dakara"		—			Riona
"Chinese"		—			Riona
"Kitakaikisen"		—			Riona

== Bibliography ==
=== Photobooks ===
- undo (Tatsuo Watanabe, October 25, 1993, Schola) ISBN 4-7962-0135-1
- Shinoyama Kishin News 4 Hazuki Riona (August 30, 1994, Asahi Press)
- Riona, Debut Mae... (December 10, 1995, Bunkasha) ISBN 4-8211-2073-9
- Riona 7 Days (Tatsuo Watanabe, December 25, 1995, Bunkasha)
- riona hazuki tunjung (Tatsuo Watanabe, May 20, 1997, Shogakukan) ISBN 4-09-101190-X
- Riona (Kishin Shinoyama, May 1, 1998, Bunkasha) ISBN 4-8211-2223-5
- Riona: Limited Edition (November 20, 1998, Bunkasha)
- Accident Series 3: Riona Hazuki + Kishin Shinoyama (October 16, 1998, Asahi Press) ISBN 4-255-98041-1
- Riona S (Kishin Shinoyama, January 1, 2001, Bunkasha) ISBN 4-8211-2363-0

=== Autobiography ===
- Shinjitsu (November 1998, Shogakukan)
