= The Insect Woman =

- Film poster
- Directed by: Shōhei Imamura
- Written by: Keiji Hasebe; Shohei Imamura
- Starring: Sachiko Hidari; Jitsuko Yoshimura; Masumi Harukawa
- Cinematography: Shinsaku Himeda
- Edited by: Matsuo Tanji
- Music by: Toshiro Mayuzumi
- Production company: Nikkatsu
- Distributed by: Nikkatsu
- Release date: November 16, 1963 (Japan)
- Running time: 123 minutes
- Country: Japan
- Language: Japanese
- Budget: $165,000
- Box office: $1 million

The Insect Woman (Japanese: にっぽん昆虫記, Hepburn: Nippon konchūki; lit. "Entomological Chronicles of Japan") is a 1963 Japanese drama film directed by Shōhei Imamura. It was entered into the 14th Berlin International Film Festival, where Sachiko Hidari won the Silver Bear for Best Actress award. It was also awarded numerous national film prizes.

== Plot ==
The film follows Tome, a young woman born to a rural lower-class family in the Tōhoku region in 1918, who, after a long series of mishaps, rises to the status of a madam in the post-war era. When she is sentenced to jail, her daughter Nobuko becomes her patron's lover, but later steals his money to use it for building up a farming commune.

== Cast ==
- Sachiko Hidari as Tome Matsuki
- Jitsuko Yoshimura as Nobuko
- Emiko Aizawa as Rui
- Masumi Harukawa as Midori
- Emiko Higashi as Kane
- Daizaburo Hirata as Kamibayashi
- Seizaburo Kawazu as Karasawa
- Teruko Kishi as Rin
- Tanie Kitabayashi as Madam
- Kazuo Kitamura as Chuji
- Asao Koike as Sawakichi
- Masakazu Kuwayama as Owagawa En's Lover
- Hiroyuki Nagato as Matsunami
- Shoichi Ozawa as Ken
- Sumie Sasaki as En
- Taiji Tonoyama as Foreman
- Shigeru Tsuyuguchi as Honda

== Production ==
In a 1977 interview, director Imamura explained that he had chosen Hidari for the role due to her vitality and energy, which had impressed him in the film The Maid's Kid (Jochukko, 1955). Yet according to Hidari, she and Imamura disagreed profoundly on the way she should play her character, calling him a "chauvinist" in retrospect for his bullying the then-pregnant actress by e.g. insisting on multiple retakes in delicate scenes.

== Release ==
The Insect Woman was released in Japan on 16 November 1963, earning $500,000 in four weeks. It was re-released with Getsuyōbi no Yuka in February 1964, earning a similar amount.

The film was released as a region 1 NTSC DVD in 2009 as part of The Criterion Collection's Shohei Imamura DVD box and as a region B Blu-ray in 2011 by Masters of Cinema.

== Reception ==
Variety magazine declared the film being "potent adult film fare by any nation's standards" and praised the camera work by Masahisa Himeda and performances by Sachiko Hidari, Kazuo Kitamura and Jitsuko Yoshimura. The review noted that the film takes place over a period of 45 years in an episodic technique "consciously causing viewer alienation".

The film won 14 awards in Japan, including the Blue Ribbon Award for Best Film and Kinema Junpo Award for Best Film of the Year.
