= I, the Executioner (1968 film) =

- Directed by: Tai Kato
- Written by: Tai Kato; Haruhiko Mimura; Yoji Yamada
- Story by: Tadashi Hiromi
- Produced by: Kunio Sawamura
- Starring: Makoto Satō; Chieko Baisho; Tatsuo Matsumura
- Cinematography: Keiji Maruyama
- Edited by: Shizu Osawa
- Music by: Hajime Kaburagi
- Distributed by: Shochiku
- Release date: 13 April 1968
- Running time: 91 minutes
- Country: Japan
- Language: Japanese

I, the Executioner (みな殺しの霊歌, Minagoroshi no Reika; aka Requiem for a Massacre) is a 1968 Japanese neo-noir crime thriller film directed by Tai Kato, who co-wrote the screenplay with Haruhiko Mimura and Yoji Yamada, based on a story by Tadashi Hiromi. The film stars Makoto Satō as a violent criminal who avenges the death of a young boy.

== Plot ==
Kawashima avenges a young boy by tracking down and killing the five women who sexually molested and drove him to suicide. Police investigate the links between the murders to uncover the perpetrator.

== Cast ==
- Makoto Satō as Tadashi Kawashima / Isao Shima
- Chieko Baisho as Haruko
- Sanae Nakahara as Keiko
- Kin Sugai as Misa
- Yoshiko Sawa as Misao
- Oh Ranfan as Takako
- Tatsuo Matsumura as Chief Detective Kasahara

== Production ==
The project originated with a proposal from producer Kunio Sawamura, who approached Tai Kato about making a contemporary adaptation of Shūgorō Yamamoto's Goben no Tsubaki, previously adapted for the screen by Yoshitarō Nomura in 1964. Kato later recalled that he had regarded the material as potentially difficult to handle, but that its risks were also what attracted him to the project. The resulting film substantially recast the revenge premise: the avenging protagonist became a man, played by Makoto Satō, while the people against whom he directs his vengeance became women.

Kato asked Yoji Yamada to collaborate with him on the film's story construction, having known each other for several years. Yamada had first written to Kato after seeing his 1958 film Tales of Young Genji Kuro 2, and the two subsequently corresponded. Yamada later asked Kato to adapt a work by Seiji Fujiwara for The Honest Fool. In 1966, when Shochiku was considering bringing directors from other studios into its productions, Yamada recommended Kato, who was working as a director at Toei Company. Kato consequently directed By a Man's Face Shall You Know Him for Shochiku before making I, The Executioner.

Kato described Yamada's contribution as a form of restraint suited to the unusual subject. He explained that he had approached Yamada because their sensibilities were different, and that he expected him to act as a kind of “brake” on the dangerous aspects of the material—not by diminishing it, but potentially by helping it develop further. The two worked together on the film's overall structure. Haruhiko Mimura, who was then working as an assistant director, subsequently developed the story into a screenplay.

Makoto Satō was cast as Masashi Kawashima. The role brought him to Shochiku from Toho, where he had been under contract; it was his first appearance in a Shochiku production. Chieko Baisho played Haruko, the waitress with whom Kawashima becomes involved. Mimura noted that the choice came from Kato's interest in exploring how the type of ordinary woman that Baisho had played in Yamada's The Sunshine Girl (1963) would interact with a violent outsider.

According to an account given by Satō's son Tōsuke at a 2021 discussion of the film, Kato asked the actor whether he had read the morning newspaper before coming to the set. When Satō said he had not, Kato explained that Kawashima was a fugitive who would be anxious to see whether his name or photograph had appeared in the news, and that the actor needed to understand this habitual behaviour to portray him convincingly. Satō also recalled that Kato asked him for material for a conversation between hostesses in a bar scene. Satō suggested a remark he had overheard at a bar in Shimokitazawa, about a woman saying that she would sleep with Che Guevara; Kato incorporated the anecdote into the scene.

Kenji Maruyama, who had served as camera assistant on the films of Yasujirō Ozu, served as director of photography for the film, continuing to work with Kato until Ondekoza, the director's final film. Shot on 35mm on the widescreen format, the film makes use of Kato's trademark low-angle compositions, close-ups, deep focus and long takes. An admirer of Ozu's work, Kato and Maruyama, visited Ozu's grave at Engaku-ji in Kamakura after shooting had been completed.

== Home media ==
I, the Executioner was released in North America by Film Movement on March 25, 2025, as part of a two-film set titled Two Faces of Tai Kato, alongside By a Man's Face Shall You Know Him.
