= Sadao Nakajima =

Japanese film director and screenwriter (1934–2023)

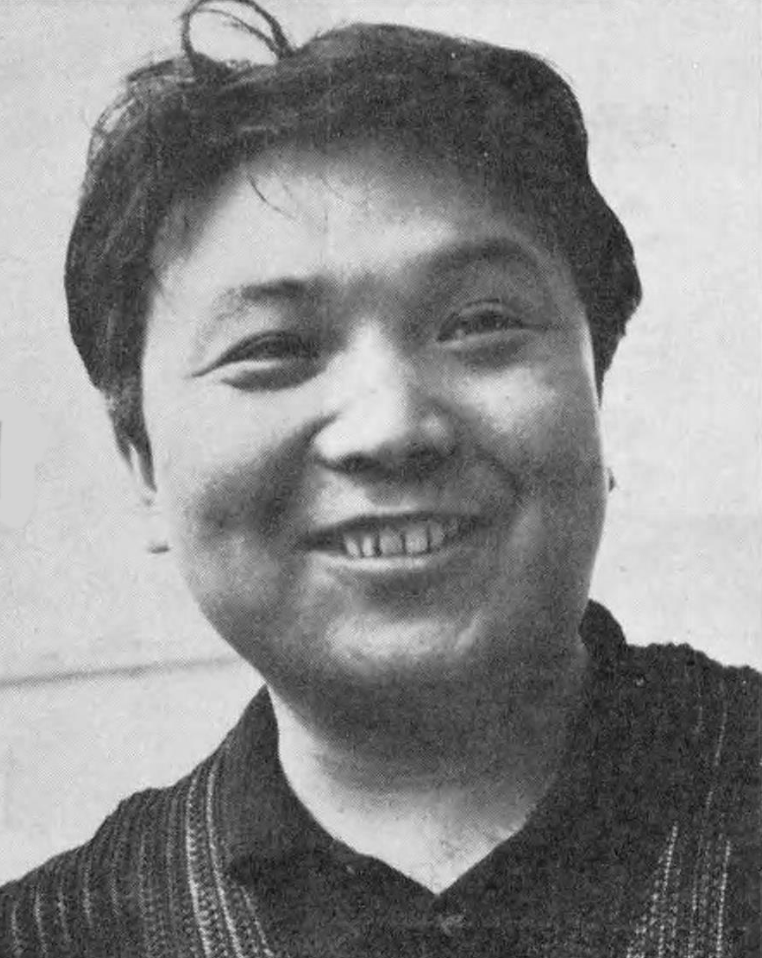
- Nakajima in 1967
- Born: August 8, 1934; Tōgane, Chiba, Empire of Japan
- Died: June 11, 2023 (aged 88); Kyoto City, Japan
- Occupation: Film director

Sadao Nakajima (Japanese: 中島貞夫, Hepburn: Nakajima Sadao; August 8, 1934 – June 11, 2023) was a Japanese film director and screenwriter known for his work in yakuza films and jidaigeki.

== Career ==
Born in Tōgane, Chiba, he attended Hibiya High School and then the University of Tokyo before joining the Toei studio in 1959. Working at Toei's Kyoto studio, he served as an assistant director under such directors as Masahiro Makino, Tadashi Imai, and Tomotaka Tasaka. He made his directorial debut in 1964 with Kunoichi Ninpō, and won the Directors Guild of Japan New Directors Award in 1966 for Yakuza (893) Gurentai, the first gendaigeki shot at Toei's Kyoto studio. He directed such popular film series as Kogarashi Monjirō and Nihon no Don, and also worked in television. His 1985 film Seburi Monogatari was entered into the 35th Berlin International Film Festival. From 1987 to 2008 he served as a professor of the Osaka University of Arts. He directed over 60 films in his career.

Nakajima died from pneumonia on June 11, 2023, at the age of 88.

== Selected filmography ==
- Female Ninja Magic (くノ一忍法, Kunoichi Ninpō; 1964)
- The Spying Sorceress (くノ一化粧, Kunoichi Keshō; 1964)
- Yakuza Hooligans (893愚連隊, Yakuza (893) Gurentai; 1966)
- Memoir of Japanese Assassinations (日本暗殺秘録, Nihon Ansatsu Hiroku; 1969)
- Withered Tree, the Adventures of Monjiro (木枯し紋次郎, Kogarashi Monjirō; 1972)
- Aesthetics of a Bullet (鉄砲玉の美学, Teppōdama no Bigaku; 1973)
- Girl Boss: Escape From Reform School (女番長 感化院脱走, Sukeban: Kankain Dassō; 1973)
- Tokyo-Seoul-Bangkok Drug Triangle (東京－ソウル－バンコック 実録麻薬地帯, Tōkyō-Souru-Bankokku jitsuroku mayaku chitai; 1973)
- Jeans Blues No Future (ジーンズブルース 明日なき無頼派, Jīnzu Buruusu Asu Naki Buraiha; 1974)
- The Rapacious Jailbreaker (脱獄広島殺人囚, Datsugoku Hiroshima Satsujin-shū; 1974)
- Bohachi Bushido: The Villain (忘八武士道 さ無頼, Bohachi Bushido Saburai; 1974) (screenplay)
- Crazed Beast (狂った野獣, Kurutta Yajū; 1976)
- The Japanese Godfather (やくざ戦争 日本の首領(ドン), Yakuza Sensō: Nihon no Don; 1977)
- The Japanese Godfather II: Ambition (日本の首領(ドン) 野望篇, Nihon no Don: Yabō-hen; 1977)
- The Japanese Godfather III: Conclusion (日本の首領(ドン) 完結篇, Nihon no Don: Kanketsu-hen; 1978)
- The Shogun Assassins (真田幸村の謀略, Sanada Yukimura no Bōryaku; 1979)
- Conquest (制覇, Seiha; 1982)
- Theater of Life (人生劇場, Jinsei Gekijō; 1983) - Co-directed with Kinji Fukasaku and Jun'ya Satō
- Appassionata (序の舞, Jo no Mai; 1984)
- The Seburi Story (瀬降り物語, Seburi monogatari; 1985)
- Takeda Shingen (武田信玄; 1988) - TV movie
- Shogun's Shadow (将軍家光の乱心 激突, Shōgun Iemitsu no ranshin: Gekitotsu; 1989) (screenplay)
- Lady Kasuga (女帝 春日局, Jotei: Kasuga no tsubone; 1990)
- Yakuza Ladies Revisited (新・極道の妻たち, Shin gokudo no onna-tachi; 1991)
- Yakuza Ladies: Dangerous Gamble (極道の妻たち 危険な賭け, Gokudo no onna-tachi: Kiken na kake; 1996)
- Nemuri Kyōshirō 3: The Man with No Tomorrow (眠狂四郎 今日あって、明日なき命を生きる者, Nemuri Kyōshirō: Kyō atte, ashita naki inochi o ikiru mono; 1996) - TV movie
- Chambara: The Art of Japanese Swordplay (時代劇は死なず ちゃんばら美学考, Jidaigeki wa shinazu: Chanbara bigakukou; 2015) - Documentary
- Love's Twisting Path (多十郎殉愛記, Tajuro Junaiki; 2019)

== Bibliography ==
- Nakajima, Sadao (2004). Shingo Kōno (ed.). Yūgeki no bigaku: eiga kantoku Nakajima Sadao (in Japanese). Tokyo: Waizu Shuppan. ISBN 4-89830-173-8.
