= Shoichi Ozawa =

Japanese actor (1929–2012)

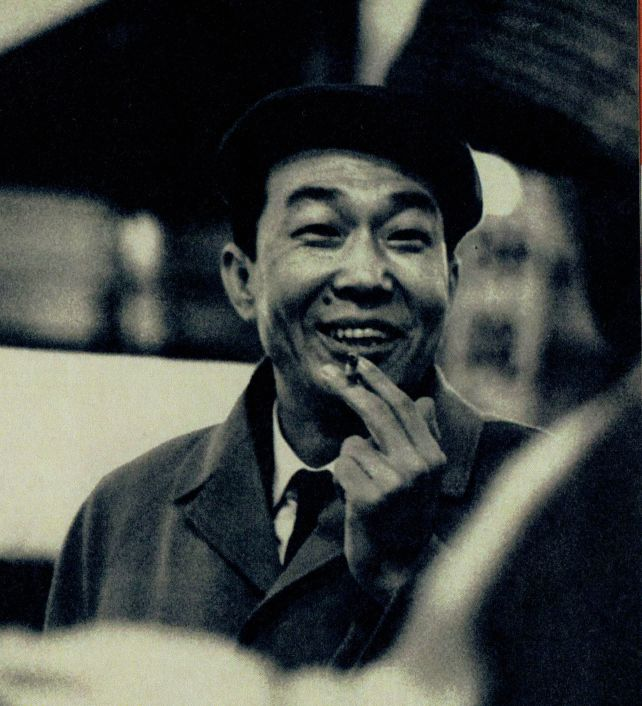
Shōichi Ozawa

Shōichi Ozawa (小沢 昭一, Ozawa Shōichi; April 6, 1929 – December 10, 2012) was a Japanese actor, radio host, singer, and prominent researcher and expert on Japanese folk art. He also founded the Shabondama-za theater company.

Ozawa, who was born in Tokyo, graduated from Waseda University. He began acting after college, beginning with his debut stage role in 1951. He also appeared in television and film roles, acting quite frequently in films directed by Shohei Imamura and Yūzō Kawashima. In 1971, Ozawa launched his long running radio show.

A respected folk art expert, Ozawa also researched traditional Japanese performing arts. He recorded and released "Nihon no Horo Gei" ("Japan's Itinerant Arts") based on his research.

In 2004, Ozawa became the "mayor" of Meiji Mura, an open-air museum in Aichi Prefecture which showcases Meiji Era architecture. The Japanese government awarded Ozawa the Order of the Rising Sun, Gold Rays with Rosette in 2001 and the Medal with Purple Ribbon in 1994 for his body of work.

Shōichi Ozawa died on December 10, 2012, at the age of 83.

== Filmography ==
- Suzaki Paradise: Akashingō (1956)
- Sun in the Last Days of the Shogunate (1957)
- Endless Desire (1958)
- My Second Brother (1959)
- Pigs and Battleships (1961)
- Foundry Town (1962)
- The Insect Woman (1963)
- Bad Girl (1963)
- Kunoichi ninpō (1964)
- Story of a Prostitute (1965)
- Gulliver's Travels Beyond the Moon (1965)
- The Threat (1966)
- The Pornographers (1966)
- A Fool's Love (1967)
- The Human Bullet (1968)
- Summer Soldiers (1972)
- The Gate of Youth (1975)
- Eijanaika (1981)
- Tora-san's Promise (1981)
- The Ballad of Narayama (1983)
- Gonza the Spearman (1986)
- Black Rain (1989)
- The Eel (1997)
- Dr. Akagi (1998)
