= House of Terrors =

1965 Japanese horror film

- Theatrical release poster

Japanese name
- Kanji: 怪談せむし男
Transcriptions
- Revised Hepburn: Kaidan semushi otoko
- Directed by: Hajime Sato
- Screenplay by: Hajime Takaiwa
- Produced by: Hiroshi Okawa
- Starring: Kō Nishimura; Yuko Kusunoki as Yoshie; Yoko Hayama; Masumi Harukawa; Shinjiro Ebara
- Production company: Toei Company
- Release date: 1965
- Running time: 81 minutes
- Country: Japan
- Language: Japanese

House of Terrors (Japanese: 怪談せむし男, Hepburn: Kaidan semushi otoko; lit. 'Ghost Story of a Hunchbacked Man'), also known as The Ghost of the Hunchback, is a 1965 Japanese horror film directed by Hajime Sato and produced by Toei Company.

== Cast ==
- Kō Nishimura
- Yuko Kusunoki as Yoshie
- Yoko Hayama
- Masumi Harukawa
- Shinjiro Ebara

== Release ==
House of Terrors was dubbed in Italian and released in Italy as Il pozzo di Satana, featuring anglicized credits.

== Home media ==
In 2022, a 2K restoration of the film was released on Blu-ray in Region A by Mondo Macabro.
