= Tai Kato =

Japanese filmmaker (1916–1985)

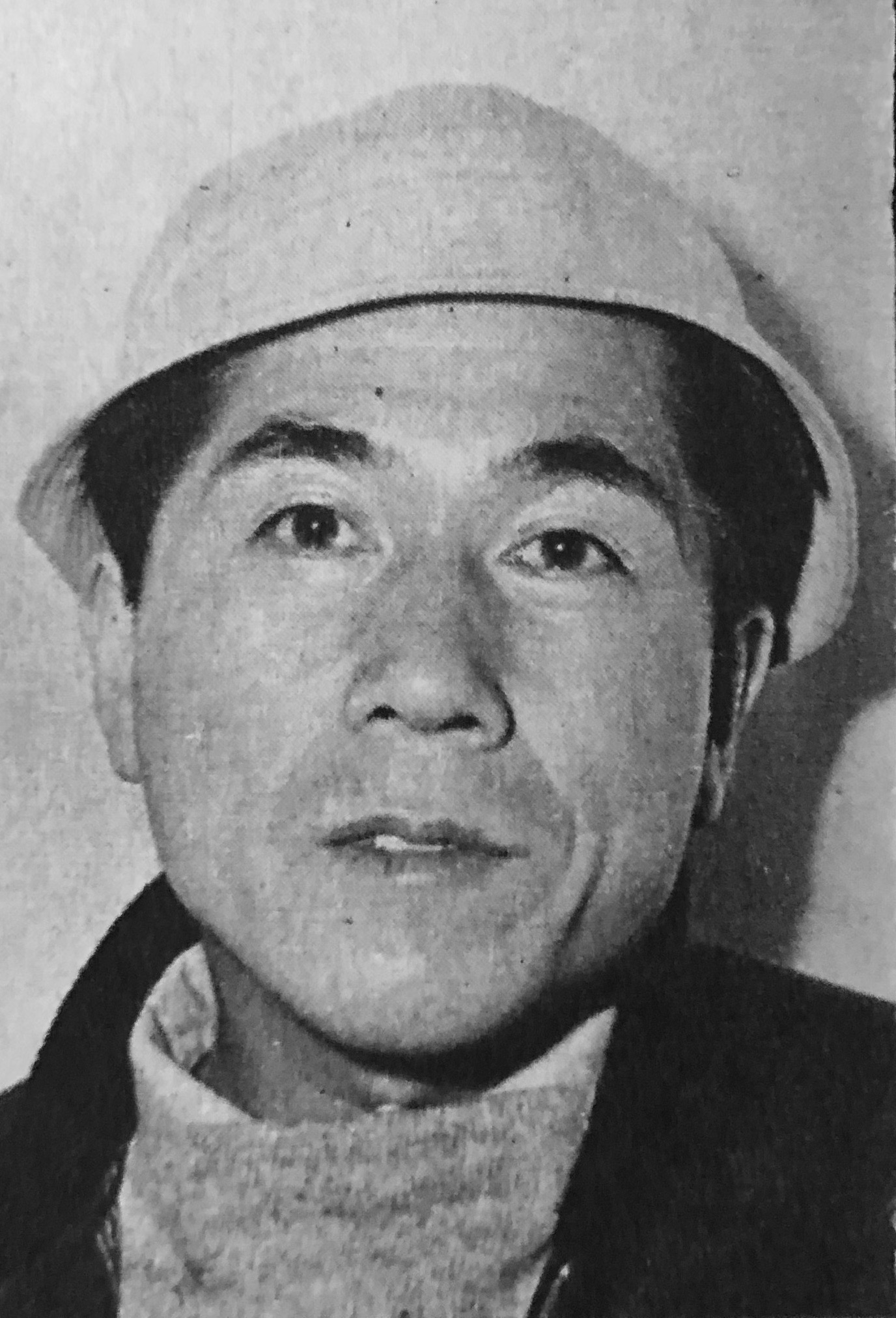
- Kato in 1962
- Born: Yasumichi Katō; August 24, 1916; Kobe, Hyōgo, Japan
- Died: June 17, 1985 (aged 68)
- Occupations: Film director, screenwriter
- Years active: 1941–1981
- Spouse: Sakae Kato
- Children: Fumiko Kato
- Relatives: Sadao Yamanaka (uncle)

Tai Kato (Japanese: 加藤 泰, Hepburn: Katō Tai; August 24, 1916 – June 17, 1985) was a Japanese film director and screenwriter. He was best known for making yakuza films at Toei Company in the 1960s.

== Biography ==
Tai Kato was born in Kobe, Japan on August 24, 1916. His father was an importer and his mother was the sister of film director Sadao Yamanaka. When his father's business went bankrupt, Kato was sent to live with his grandparents in Nagoya at the age of five. In middle school, he became interested in film, particularly period dramas by Daisuke Itō. He dropped out of school in his second year, and worked at a trading house in Kyoto before receiving an invitation from his uncle to move to Tokyo. Kato joined Toho studio and became an assistant director to Mikio Naruse on The Whole Family Works (1939) and other films. He switched studios to Riken Kagaku Eiga in 1941, and then to Manchukuo Film Association in Manchukuo in 1944. Both companies primarily worked in documentaries. Kato was drafted into military service; however, this happened one week before World War II ended.

After the war, Kato returned to Japan in 1946 and joined Daiei Film, where he got to work as an assistant director to Itō on 1948's Ōshō and to Akira Kurosawa on his 1950 film Rashomon. However, as chief secretary of the company's union, Kato was labelled a communist and fired as part of the Red Purge. Kato made his directorial debut with the two-part Troubles with Swords and Women, a 1951 co-production between Shin Toho and Takara Productions. He joined Toei Company in 1956, and directed Ronin in Love the following year. For 1958's Wind, Women, and Hobo, Kato had the actors appear without makeup and employed live sound. His notable films of the period include; Throne of Flame (1960), a Japanese version of Hamlet; the musical Brave Records of the Sanada Clan (1963); and Tokijiro: Lone Yakuza (1966), a remake of a 1929 Kichiro Tsuji film.

In 1965, Kato followed the Toei shift into ninkyo eiga with Blood of Revenge. In 1966 and 1967, Kato directed By a Man's Face Shall You Know Him, Opium Hills: The Hell Squad and Eighteen Years in Prison, all of which starred former yakuza boss Noboru Ando. In 1968, Kato directed I, the Executioner for Shochiku, in which Toho actor Makoto Satō stars as a wanted criminal who murders five women who molested a young boy, driving him to suicide. 1969's Red Peony Gambler 3: The Flower Cards Game is the first of three entries that Kato directed for the Red Peony Gambler series starring Junko Fuji. After moving to Shochiku, he directed Theater of Life: Youth, Lust and Spirit (1972), Blossom and Sword (1973) and Musashi Miyamoto: Sword of Fury (1973), all of which are remakes. Mark Schilling cited 1981's Flames of Blood as one of the director's late-career triumphs.

Tai Kato died from liver failure on June 17, 1985, at the age of 68. At the time, he was writing a screenplay of an adaptation of Ihara Saikaku's Five Women Who Loved Love. His last film, Ondekoza, a documentary on the Ondekoza drum troupe, was made in 1981, but not released until 1994.

== Style and influences ==
Schilling wrote that Kato often employed low camera angles due to being an admirer of Yasujirō Ozu. Kato would have holes digged into the ground in order to get the low camera placement. Noboru Ando, who worked with Kato on By a Man's Face Shall You Know Him (1966), recalled that Kato explained his low-angle compositions by comparing the camera's position to that of a spectator watching a performance from one of the best seats in a theatre. Ando remembered assistant directors following Kato with shovels as he dug holes to position the camera, although the concrete floor of Shochiku's studio prevented him from doing so indoors. Contrary to standard practice of the time, Kato used tight shots and quick cuts in his action scenes. Although this reduces the attacking actor to a "swirling mass", Schilling said it brings the viewer into the heart of the action. Kevin Thomas of Los Angeles Times noted that Kato has been compared with Budd Boetticher and Samuel Fuller. Paul Schrader compared Kato's Theater of Life: Youth, Lust and Spirit (1972) to Sergio Leone's best work.

Kato's visual style also relied on widescreen compositions, layered arrangements of figures and objects, and the obstruction of the viewer's line of sight. Film critic Olivier Ronat has described this approach as one of partial vision: foreground objects, passing bodies, architecture, and translucent screens frequently obscure parts of the action or divert attention from the principal characters. Rather than consistently directing the viewer toward a single focal point, Kato's compositions distribute visual information across several planes, requiring the viewer to piece together the relationships between figures and their surroundings.

These techniques are evident in Blood of Revenge (1965), By a Man's Face Shall You Know Him (1966), and Miyamoto Musashi (1973), in which foreground elements and crowded compositions complicate the view of dramatic events. In Beast in the Shadows (1977), a prolonged sequence places characters behind a fabric screen, restricting their visibility as the scene develops. Ronat interprets such devices as part of Katō's recurring exploration of the limits of what the viewer can see and know.

In a 2016 interview, Junko Fuji noted Kato's meticulous attention to performances from the background, recalling that a long-take sequence from Red Peony Gambler: Oryu's Return (1970) took a long while to complete due to Kato's dissatisfaction with a performance from a background actor. In the same interview, Fuji noted that Kato extensively drew storyboards before shooting, and described him as a stubborn man who, nevertheless, was open to suggestions from his actors.

Although Kato worked in commercial cinema, Ronat opined that his films could be just as bold as the movies of the Japanese New Wave, and placed him alongside Seijun Suzuki and Yasuzo Masumura as directors who developed unconventional visual styles in commercial cinema.

== Filmography as director ==
- Submarine (1941) - documentary under the pseudonym "Yoshio Nishio"
- Bubble (1943) - documentary under the pseudonym "Yoshio Nishio"
- Lice Are Scary (1944) - documentary under a pseudonym
- Military Academy (1944) - documentary under a pseudonym
- Troubles with Swords and Women, Part 1: Change of a Woman's Heart (1951)
- Troubles with Swords and Women, Part 2: The Blade Reflecting the Light of a Fallen Star (1951)
- Shimizu Port is Scarier Than a Demon (1952)
- Book of Birds (1952)
- Ninjutsu Jiraiya, Part 1 (1955)
- Ninjutsu Jiraiya, Part 2 (1955)
- Ronin in Love (1957)
- Tales of Young Genji Kuro, Part 1 (1957)
- The Tattooed Lord (1958)
- Tales of Young Genji Kuro, Part 2 (1958)
- Wind, Women, and Hobo (1958)
- Eight Views of Samurai (1958)
- Genghis Khan and His Mongols (1959)
- Gallant Youth of Edo (1960)
- Throne of Flame (1960)
- Asagiri Highway (1961)
- The Tale of Oiwa's Ghost (1961)
- In Search of Mother (1962)
- Sazen Tange: The Masterpiece Blade (1962)
- Brave Records of the Sanada Clan (1963)
- Warrior of the Wind (Kaze no Bushi) (1964)
- Fighting Tatsu, the Rickshaw Man (1964)
- Cruel Story of the Shogunate's Downfall (1964)
- Blood of Revenge (1965)
- Tokijiro: Lone Yakuza (1966)
- Drained to the Bone (1966)
- By a Man's Face Shall You Know Him (1966)
- Opium Hills: The Hell Squad (1966)
- Eighteen Years in Prison (1967)
- I, the Executioner (1968)
- Red Peony Gambler: The Flower Cards Game (1969)
- Red Peony Gambler: Oryu's Return (1970)
- Red Peony Gambler: You are Dead (1971)
- Modern Lady Gambler (1972)
- Theater of Life: Youth, Lust and Spirit (1972)
- Flower and Dragon (1973)
- Musashi Miyamoto: Sword of Fury (1973)
- Blossom and Sword (1973)
- The Beast in the Shadows (1977)
- Flames of Blood (1981)
- Ondekoza (1994) - documentary
