= Ozu's Anti-Cinema =

2003 book by Yoshishige Yoshida

- English edition cover
- Author: Yoshishige Yoshida
- Original title: Ozu Yasujirō no han eiga (小津安二郎の反映画)
- Translator: Daisuke Miyao; Kyoko Hirano
- Language: English
- Series: Michigan Monograph Series in Japanese Studies
- Subject: Yasujirō Ozu films
- Published: Ann Arbor : Center for Japanese Studies, University of Michigan (October 2003)
- Pages: 176
- Awards: Japanese Ministry of Education Commendation Award, 1998
- ISBN: 9781929280261 (English); ISBN 9784006021870 (Japanese)
- OCLC: 53013473

Ozu's Anti-Cinema (Japanese: 小津安二郎の反映画, Hepburn: Ozu Yasujirō no han eiga) is a 1998 book written by Yoshishige Yoshida (published under his pseudonym Kiju Yoshida), translated into English in 2003, and published by Center for Japanese Studies, University of Michigan. It included analysis and commentary on Yasujirō Ozu's films and film-making techniques.

== Background ==
The book was inspired by the documentary series Yoshida Kiju ga kataru Ozu-san no eiga (Kiju Yoshida Talking about Ozu Films) and translated from Japanese by Daisuke Miyao and Kyoko Hirano. It also happens to be the first Japanese book based on Yasujirō Ozu's works to be translated in English. Yoshida himself is a well known director, having directed Japanese New Wave films like Eros + Massacre (1969) and Coup d'Etat (1973). The book was originally published in Japanese as Ozu Yasujirō no han eiga in 1998. The author had worked with Shōchiku Studio as an assistant director and like several other directors of that time, he was critical of Ozu's films. Yoshida called the research work for the book "a reflection of his own awareness of aging". The book was awarded the Japanese Ministry of Education Commendation Award, 1998. Previously, Masaaski Tsuzuki, Shigehiko Hasumi, Masasumi Tanaka, Paul Schrader and David Bordwell had published works on Yasujirō Ozu.

== Summary ==
The book included descriptions of the author and Ozu's meetings. They met for the first time at a party shortly after Yoshida had published an article in which he reviewed Ozu's 1961 film The End of Summer negatively. Their second and last meeting was at Ozu's deathbed, where he told Yoshida "Cinema is drama, not accident". He died about a month later due to cancer. His statement puzzled Yoshida and he compared it to several of his previous statements, including one in which he said "directors are like prostitutes under a bridge, hiding their faces and calling customers". To know the actual meaning of the statement, Yoshida researched Ozu's films and he discovered that though they were almost similar in terms of their titles and themes, they resembled his attitude "towards cinema and the world" and he concluded that Ozu considered the world a chaos. Yoshida further wrote "Ozu-san’s filmmaking style can be seen as an act of penance for the sins of his camera’s assault on the world." He felt that Ozu was remaking films with slight differences and called Early Spring anti-Tokyo Story. In his view, Ozu's films were so similar that they formed a "labyrinthine circle". Yoshida felt that Ozu was different from the rest of Japanese filmmakers and had "no relationship with any conventional Japanese sense of beauty". He opined that the pillow shots in Tokyo Story were shot from an "anonymous viewpoint" and in the film, the city was portrayed as a "shining emptiness". The book notes that Ozu "did not trust actors' performances". It describes A Hen in the Wind (1948) as an "unusual and unlikely film". In the book, Yoshida called Ozu "a born filmmaker". The fishing scene in There Was a Father (1942) was also discussed.

== Reception ==
Jasper Sharp wrote for Midnight Eye that the book was "a fascinatingly readable reappraisal of Ozu's life and philosophy from a director who initially came from a fundamentally diametrically opposed viewpoint, which attempts to get to the heart of just why Ozu's films are so enduringly powerful to this day." Darrell William Davis (Japanese Studies) wrote "Ozu’s Anti-Cinema is stimulating because of its rhetoric of antithesis, repetition and allusion." He rejected Yoshida's idea about Ozu's perspective about the world and argued that his early films were totally opposite to Yoshida's idea. Citing Late Spring (1949), Tokyo Story (1953), Early Spring (1956) and Late Autumn (1960) as examples, Davis wrote "chaos and unruliness is totally opposite to the world of these films. Davis opined that "Yoshida's approach could perhaps be described as phenomenological." He added that "Yoshida’s discussion tries to put that misapprehension right, but only in his own personal history." He criticised the author for repeating the same concepts and expressions and suggested that translation work might be a reason for this. About the book's style, he said that understanding it was difficult than reading it and readers will be provoked to move to films.

Linda C. Ehrlich (The Journal of Asian Studies) opined that the translation work had left redundancy in the book. In her view the redundancy "[gave] the clearest sense of the writer’s voice." Likening the book to Ozu's works Ehrlich called it "a joy to revisit" and "a story of memories and revisitings" and mentioned that it "[zoomed] in and out of favorite scenes from Ozu’s films." Dennis C. Washburn (Journal of Japanese Studies) called the translation "clear and sensitive" and the book "an important work to the English-language literature on Ozu", though he noted that the analysis "[tended] toward fragmentation". He felt that Ozu's last words had the same impact as Charles Foster Kane final word "Rosebud" (Citizen Kane). Washburn praised the author for his "sensitivity and commitment to the value of film art". He opined that the term Anti-Cinema referred to Ozu's experimentation and opposition to conventional film-making techniques. Keiko I. McDonald (Japanese Language and Literature) praised the translators for "matching style and substance". However, she pointed out a few errors in translation. She concluded by saying "some will see Ozu with new eyes; others will think differently about his artistry; and still others, though unconvinced, will have to admit that this is a daring and original book." Chris Fujiwara wrote for Moving Image Source that Yoshida's films also tended to be anti-cinematic and that they do not "narrate a story, but [describe] gaps".

== Journal articles ==
- Washburn, Dennis C. (Summer 2005). "Ozu's Anti-Cinema by Yoshida Kiju, Daisuke Miyao, Kyoko Hirano". Journal of Japanese Studies. 31 (2): 458–462. doi:10.1353/jjs.2005.0068. JSTOR 25064588. S2CID 144693146.
- Ehrlich, Linda C. (August 2004). "Ozu's Anti-Cinema by Yoshida Kiju, Daisuke Miyao, Kyoko Hirano". The Journal of Asian Studies. 63 (3): 805–807. doi:10.1017/S0021911804001998. JSTOR 4133490.
- McDonald, Keiko I. (April 2005). "Ozu's Anti-Cinema by Kiju Yoshida". Japanese Language and Literature. 39 (1): 68–75. doi:10.2307/30038891. JSTOR 30038891.
- Davis, Darrell William (2006). "Ozu's Anti-Cinema (Book review)". Japanese Studies. 26 (2): 260–262. doi:10.1080/10371390600883727. S2CID 216152891.
