= Sei Ikeno =

Japanese composer (1931–2004)

- 池野成
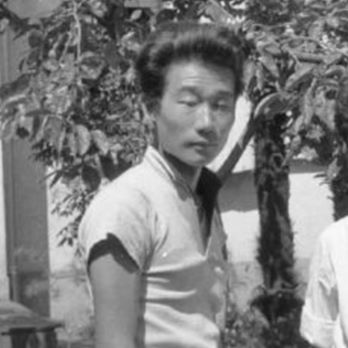
- Born: 24 February 1931; Sapporo, Hokkaido, Japan
- Died: 13 August 2004 (aged 73); Tokyo, Japan
- Occupation: Composer

Sei Ikeno (池野 成, Ikeno Sei; 24 February 1931 – 13 August 2004) was a Japanese composer who wrote the film scores for directors such as Kōzaburō Yoshimura, Yūzō Kawashima, Yasuzō Masumura and new wave filmmaker Yoshishige Yoshida.

Ikeno was born in Sapporo, Hokkaido. In 1950, he entered the Tokyo Music School (now Tokyo University of the Arts) and studied under Tomojirō Ikenouchi and Akira Ifukube. In addition to writing film and other music work, he lectured on composition and orchestration at the Tokyo College of Music and the Tokyo University of the Arts. He died in Tokyo in 2004.

== Orchestral/chamber ==
- Introduction et Allegro Symphonique - for orchestra (1952)
- Ballet-Suite: Ballet en un Acte - for orchestra (1953)
- Danses Concertantes - for orchestra (1953)
- Totem Intituma - for trb & perc ensemble (1959)
- Evocation - for solo mari, 6trb, 6perc (1973)
- Timpanata - for solo timp, 1 fl, 3 hr, 3 trb, 1 tuba, 6 perc (1977)
- Rapsodia Concertante for violin and orchestra (1983)
- Fragement Antique - for 12 trb, 6 perc (1984)
- Octet - for 6 euph, 2 tuba (1984)
- Prelude - for brass band (1987)
- Omaggio a Maestro A. IFUKUBE - for chamber orchestra (1988)
- Tamburata for 8 percussionists (1989)
- Tamburata for 20 percussionists (1996)
- Divertimento - for 8 perc (1997)

== Film music (selected) ==
- 1956: Night River (dir. Kōzaburō Yoshimura)
- 1961: A Geisha's Diary (dir. Yūzō Kawashima)
- 1962: The Temple of the Wild Geese (dir. Yūzō Kawashima)
- 1962: Black Test Car (dir. Yasuzō Masumura)
- 1962: A Woman's Life (dir. Yasuzō Masumura)
- 1962: The Graceful Brute (dir. Yūzō Kawashima)
- 1963: Bamboo Doll of Echizen (dir. Kōzaburō Yoshimura)
- 1964: Zatoichi's Flashing Sword (dir. Kazuo Ikehiro)
- 1965: An Innocent Witch (dir. Heinosuke Gosho)
- 1966: Woman of the Lake (dir. Yoshishige Yoshida)
- 1966: Red Angel (dir. Yasuzō Masumura)
- 1967: The Affair (dir. Yoshishige Yoshida)
- 1967: Zatoichi the Outlaw (dir. Satsuo Yamamoto)
- 1968: Affair in the Snow (dir. Yoshishige Yoshida)

== Bibliography ==
- "日本映画音楽史を形作る人々:第17回 池野成 (People who shaped the history of Japanese film music #17: Ikeno Sei)". Kinema Junpo. July 1973. p. 123.
