= The Affair (1967 film) =

1967 film by Yoshishige Yoshida

- Theatrical release poster
- Directed by: Yoshishige Yoshida
- Screenplay by: Toshiro Ishido; Yasuko Ōno; Yoshishige Yoshida
- Based on: Shiroi keshi by Masaaki Tachihara
- Produced by: Tsunenori Ibaraki; Keinosuke Kubo
- Starring: Mariko Okada; Isao Kimura; Yoshie Minami
- Cinematography: Mitsuji Kanau
- Edited by: Kazuo Ōta
- Music by: Sei Ikeno
- Production company: Gendai Eigasha
- Distributed by: Shochiku
- Release date: 13 May 1967 (Japan)
- Running time: 98 minutes
- Country: Japan
- Language: Japanese

The Affair (Japanese: 情炎, Hepburn: Jōen), also known as Jo-en, Joen, and Ardour Aflame, is a 1967 Japanese drama film directed by Yoshishige Yoshida and starring Mariko Okada, Isao Kimura and Yoshie Minami. It was written by Toshiro Ishido, Yasuko Ōno and Yoshida based on Masaaki Tachihara's 1965 novel Shiroi keshi.

== Plot ==
One year after her mother died in an accident, Oriko returns to writing poetry which she had given up when she married her husband Takashi. At a gathering of fellow writers, she meets Mitsuharu, a sculptor and former lover of her late mother. Oriko had despised her mother's changing affairs, although she had been a widow by then, and is herself blamed by her husband for her coldness. Mitsuharu informs her that he wasn't her mother's last lover, but that she had left him for a labourer, with whom she was seen drunk on the day when she was fatally hit by a truck.

One night, Oriko witnesses her husband's sister Yuko having sex with a construction worker in a hut, which she considers rape and reports to the police. Later, she returns to the worker's hut, where he tells her outright that she speculated on sleeping with him as well. He makes a forceful advance, to which Oriko, first reluctant, finally gives in. Oriko meets with Mitsuharu again, confessing that when she was younger, she was not only jealous of him as a daughter, but also as a woman. When she tells him of her encounter with the worker, Mitsuharu is outraged and hurt. Takashi learns of Oriko's meetings with Mitsuharu, but it is not before a confrontation between him, Oriko and Mitsuharu that Oriko and Mitsuharu start an affair.

When Mitsuharu's spine is broken after being buried under one of his stone sculptures, Oriko, still married, vows to stay with him, although it is unclear if he will gain back his ability to walk and his virility. In one of her recurring fantasies about her mother's accident, Oriko now sees herself as the victim and the construction worker at the truck's wheel. Some time later, she sees the worker at a train station, watching unmoved as he enters a train.

== Cast ==
- Mariko Okada as Oriko
- Isao Kimura as Mitsuharu Noto
- Yoshie Minami as Shigeko, Oriko's mother
- Tadahiko Kanno as Takashi Furuhuta
- Shigako Shimegi as Yuko, Furuhata's sister
- Etsushi Takahashi as construction worker

== Reception ==
Variety wrote: "This well-made existential parable, written and directed by Yoshihige Yoshida, is one of the most interesting Japanese films of the year. Using a completely contemporary cinematic vocabulary (telephoto lenses, over-lapped dialog tracks, variable focus, widescreen composition, fractured chronology), the director is not so much concerned with the story as he is with reflecting the totality of that single shattering experience suggested by the title, Ardour Aflame. ... The visuals are brilliant and the soundtrack is extraordinary. The film itself is moving, depressing, brilliant, sometimes erratic, and spendidly honest. The sex (there's a lot of it, even for a Japanese film) is amazingly candid."

In his book A Hundred Years of Japanese Film, film historian Donald Richie saw The Affair as a film of social concern about a woman's fight against her own sensual nature, "formally shot and edited with much economy".

== Legacy ==
The Affair was screened at the Centre Pompidou, Paris, in 2008 and at the Harvard Film Archive in 2009 as part of retrospectives on Yoshida's work.
