= A Story Written with Water =

1965 Japanese film by Yoshishige Yoshida

- Film poster
- 水で書かれた物語
- Directed by: Yoshishige Yoshida
- Written by: Yoshishige Yoshida; Toshirō Ishidō; Rumiko Kōra; Yōjirō Ishizaka (novel)
- Produced by: Hirokichi Ito; Akio Komazaki
- Starring: Yasunori Irikawa; Mariko Okada; Ruriko Asaoka; Isao Yamagata
- Cinematography: Tatsuo Suzuki
- Edited by: Hiroshi Asai
- Music by: Toshi Ichiyanagi
- Production company: Chunichi Film Company
- Distributed by: Nikkatsu
- Release date: 23 November 1965 (Japan)
- Running time: 120 minutes
- Country: Japan
- Language: Japanese

A Story Written with Water (Japanese: 水で書かれた物語, Hepburn: Mizu de kakareta monogatari) is a 1965 Japanese New Wave drama film directed by Yoshishige Yoshida, adapted from a novel by Yōjirō Ishizaka. The film's title derives from John Keats's epitaph: “Here lies One Whose Name was writ in Water.” (Note: Writ with water suggests the opposite of "carved on stone." Meaning that Keats's life and the story of the film will fade into oblivion.) It follows the story of a young man torn between his fiancée and his long-suffering single mother, towards whom he harbors an oedipal attraction. It was the director's first independent film after leaving Shochiku. It was ranked the 10th best film of the year by Kinema Junpo in 1965.

== Plot ==
Shizuo Matsutani, a young salaryman and introvert, lives with his beautiful mother, Shizuka Matsutani, towards whom he feels a strong attraction. Shizuo's father and Shizuka's husband Takao is sickly and often hospitalized, and thus unable to provide for his family. Shizuka has an affair with a wealthy man, Denzo Hashimoto. Shizuo hates the strong and confident Denzo.

Denzo and his mother recommend that he marry Denzo's daughter, his childhood friend Yumiko Hashimoto. However, Shizuo sees in Yumiko's face a resemblance to his mother. He asks Denzo if Yumiko is the daughter of Shizuka and hence his half-sister, but Denzo hesitates and denies it.

A few months later, Shizuo marries Yumiko. However, he continues to worry that he has married his sister but does not tell Yumiko and treats her in a way that makes her feel unattractive. Eventually, Shizuo visits his mother and invites her to commit double suicide with him because he has no hope for life. His mother is confused. Later he finally has sex with Yumiko and for the first time feels love for her.

== Cast ==
- Yasunori Irikawa as Shizuo Matsutani
- Mariko Okada as Shizuka Matsutani
- Shin Kishida as Takao Matsutani
- Ruriko Asaoka as Yumiko Hashimoto
- Isao Yamagata as Denzo Hashimoto

== Themes and style ==
A Story Written with Water marked a radical departure from the more conventional cinema that Yoshida created during his studio career at Shochiku. It inaugurated his celebrated cycle of "anti-melodramas," each of which starred Mariko Okada and challenged the genre's conventions regarding family and women's suffering. It is more poetic that his previous films and utilizes a complex structure of fluid flashbacks that merge past and present.
