= Masahiro Yamada (screenwriter) =

Japanese screenwriter

- 山田 正弘
- Born: Masahiro Umehara (梅原 正弘); 26 February 1931; Tokyo
- Died: 10 August 2005 (aged 74); Shinjuku, Tokyo
- Occupation: Screenwriter

Masahiro Yamada (山田 正弘, Yamada Masahiro; 26 February 1931 – 10 August 2005), real name Masahiro Umehara (梅原 正弘, Umehara Masahiro), was a Japanese screenwriter. He often worked with Yoshishige Yoshida and also penned scripts for Ultraman and other episodes in the Ultra series.

He died of lung cancer in Shinjuku, Tokyo, on 10 August 2005 at the age of 74.

== Selected filmography ==
- Ultra Q (1966) – 6 episodes
- Ultraman (1966–1967) – 6 episodes
- Flame and Women (1967)
- Ultraseven (1967–1968) – 2 episodes
- Farewell to the Summer Light (1968)
- Eros + Massacre (1969)
- Heroic Purgatory (1970)
- Confessions Among Actresses (1971)
- Ultraman Ace (1972) – 1 episode
- The War of the 16 Year Olds (1976)
- Lady Oscar: The Rose of Versailles (1979–1980) – 14 episodes
