= Tadashi Yokouchi =

Japanese actor (born 1941)

- Born: July 1, 1941 (age 84); Dalian, Kwantung Leased Territory
- Occupation: Actor
- Years active: 1967–present

Tadashi Yokouchi (横内正, Yokouchi Tadashi; born July 1, 1941) is a Japanese actor. Born in Dalian, Kwantung Leased Territory, he graduated from high school in Kitakyushu, Fukuoka Prefecture, Japan. A member of the 13th group of actors and actresses trained at the Haiyū-za, he counts Tetsuo Ishidate, Toshiyuki Hosokawa, Tomomi Satō, and Gō Katō as classmates. His older brother Shōji is a much-recorded guitarist, and his younger brother Hiroshi a composer. Tadashi belongs to TY Pro.

NHK tapped Yokouchi for the lead in the series "Tabiji," the 1967–68 morning drama.

Yokouchi's first major jidaigeki role was Atsumi Kakunoshin in the long-running "Mito Kōmon." He portrayed "Kaku-san" in the first eight series on TBS from 1969 to 1978. Fans remember his deep voice in the theme song as well. He made another appearance on the show in 2003 when the series celebrated its thousandth episode.

Another major jidaigeki role began in 1978 as Yokouchi played the historical Ōoka Tadasuke in Abarenbo Shogun (TV Asahi). Having created the role, he continued to portray the magistrate in the first seven series until 1997.

Two taiga drama roles have been his. He appeared in the 1980 Shishi no Jidai starring Bunta Sugawara, and as Shimizu Yoshimasa in the 2007 Fūrin Kazan, having been in the 1992 Nippon Television show of the same name.

A versatile talent, Yokouchi has also appeared in contemporary dramas, dubbed foreign productions, and voiced animated characters. He played Michio Kamakura, the lover of Sakura, in a television version of Otoko wa Tsurai yo. In Japan, fans of Cosmos: A Personal Voyage heard him as the voice of Carl Sagan. He also voiced Moog the Rock Giant in Hols: Prince of the Sun from Toei Animation (1968).

Yokouchi has appeared on variety programs and released a single.

== Filmography ==
=== Films ===
- Farewell to the Summer Light (1968) - Makoto Kawamura
- Hols: Prince of the Sun (1969) - Moug the Rock Giant (voice)
- Tora-san's Grand Scheme (1970) - Takao
- Lensman: Secret of The Lens (1984) - Blond haired Lensman (voice)
- Toki no Tabibito -Time Stranger- (1986) - Oda Nobunaga (voice)
- Shizumanu Taiyō (2009) - Noboru Umino

=== Television ===
- Mito Kōmon (1969–78) - Kaku-san
- The Unfettered Shogun (1978–1997) - Ōoka Tadasuke
- Fūrin Kazan (2007) - Shimizu Yoshimasa
- Tenchijin (2009) - Kobayakawa Takakage
- Gunshi Kanbei (2014) - Maeda Toshiie

=== Dubbing ===
- The Black Hole (1984 Fuji TV edition) - Dr. Hans Reinhardt (Maximilian Schell)
- Dallas - J.R. Ewing (Larry Hagman)
- Lady Chatterley's Lover (1984 NTV edition) - Oliver Mellors (Nicholas Clay)
- The Mystery of the Blue Train - Rufus Van Aldin (Elliott Gould)
- The Phantom of the Opera - Sándor Korvin / The Phantom of the Opera (Maximilian Schell)
- Rear Window (1986 TV Asahi edition) - NYPD Det. Lt. Thomas J. Doyle (Wendell Corey)
