= The Lake (Kawabata novel) =

1954 novel by Yasunari Kawabata

- First English-language edition
- Author: Yasunari Kawabata
- Original title: Mizuumi (みづうみ)
- Language: Japanese
- Published: 1954; 1974 (Kodansha) (in English)
- Publication place: Japan
- Media type: Print (paperback)

The Lake is a short 1954 novel by the Japanese writer Yasunari Kawabata. This book tells the story of a former schoolteacher named Gimpei Momoi. The Lake was adapted into a film by Yoshishige Yoshida under the title Woman of the Lake.

== Writing techniques ==
The writing techniques used by Yasunari Kawabata in this narrative of The Lake are similar to those of Japanese associative poetry, with each chapter having coherence and fluidity between them. For example, the subchapters of each of these chapters in the novel are not only interwoven in their own frame narrative, but also throughout the chapters themselves. In this novel, each scene is a transition from the previous one, and through the association of the previous episodes, the reader as well as the novel's protagonist will discover something new.

== Plot ==
Beginning in Karuizawa, the novel alternates between the now middle-aged Momoi and recurring memories of a lake from his hometown, and his interactions with a number of women, beginning with a relative and the uncomfortable circumstances of a death in his family. The novel then explores his connection to a woman who loses a purse full of several years' worth of money earned as a lover to an older man as well as a relationship with a student, Hisako, when Momoi is a teacher, a relationship that begins with a somewhat odd-request for a good cure for a foot condition Momoi suffers from and then examines the circumstances of Hisako's family, who are well-off in the immediate post-war era. Finally, the now middle-aged Momoi follows a young girl during a summer period leading up to a festival and crosses paths with a woman closer to his age.

== Interpretation ==
The Lake is a work of profound and strange beauty. The characters are cruel and cold, but Yasunari Kawabata's writing draws the reader into a dream-like feeling. In short, his writing is cold and cruel, yet extremely beautiful. The characters in The Lake are twisted; for example, the hero is obsessed with the desire to see and be seen. The hero gets pleasure in looking at women, and the women who are looked at also feel a pleasure of being looked at. The reason they indulge in this distorted pleasure is that both men and women in this novel lack the knowledge of self. The hero feels his own image through the eyes of the blurred women, and the women who are looked at in the text also look at themselves through the eyes of the hero. The Lake is not only about the male protagonist's journey of self-awareness, but also about the struggle of women to awaken to themselves as subjects and not necessarily as objects of gaze and desire.
