= Takeshi Kusaka =

Japanese actor (1931–2017)

- Born: February 24, 1931; Toshima, Tokyo, Japan
- Died: May 15, 2017 (aged 86); Spain
- Occupations: Actor, voice actor
- Years active: 1954–2017

Takeshi Kusaka (日下 武史, Kusaka Takeshi; February 24, 1931 – May 15, 2017) was a Japanese actor and voice actor from Toshima, Tokyo. He was the founder of the Shiki Theatre Company. He remarried with actress Fujiko Kimura in 2010.

== Roles ==
=== Live action films ===
- Assassination (1964) (Narahara Shigeru)
- Honoo to onna (Flame and Women) (1967)
- The Petrified Forest (1973)
- Fumō Chitai (1976) (Koide)
- Tempo suikō-den (1976)
- Antarctica (1983) (Hokkaidō University professor)
- Deaths in Tokimeki (1984)
- Those Swell Yakuza (1988)
- Teito Taisen (1989) (Fumimaro Konoe)
- Noh Mask Murders (1991)
- Mr. Moonlight (1991)
- Maadadayo (1993) (Doctor Kobayashi)
- Kaettekite Kogarashi Monjiro (1993)
- Shin sarariiman senka (1997)
- Mars Sweet Home (2000)

=== Live action television ===
- Ten to Chi to (1969) (Sanjōnishi Sanezumi)
- Naruto Hichō (1977–78) (Zeami)
- Ōoku (1983) (Ryūkō)
- Ōedo Sōsamō (1984) (Narrator)
- Sanga Moyu (1984)

=== Anime television ===
- Ginga Eiyū Densetsu (Document voiceover (episode 56))

=== Theater ===
- The Cherry Orchard
- Hamlet
- The Merchant of Venice
- Alderle or a saint
- Antigone
- Troy war will not happen
- Orphe and Yuriddis
- lark
- Understand and accumulate!
- Whose life？
- Equus
- Sluice
- Hikarigoke
- Yuriddis
- Ondine
- A man who sells memories
- Rokumeikan
- Anne of Green Gables
- Beauty and the Beast
- Devil and God

=== Theatrical animation ===
- Street Fighter II: The Animated Movie (Vega)
- Twilight of the Cockroaches

=== Dubbing roles ===
==== Live-action ====
- 99 and 44/100% Dead (Harry Crown (Richard Harris))
- Amadeus (Antonio Salieri (F. Murray Abraham))
- Avalon (Game Master (Władysław Kowalski))
- The Bridge on the River Kwai (Major Clipton (James Donald))
- The Cassandra Crossing (Dr. Jonathan Chamberlain (Richard Harris))
- Columbo (Milo Janus (Robert Conrad); episode "An Exercise in Fatality")
- Hannibal (TV Asahi edition) (Hannibal Lecter (Anthony Hopkins))
- Les Misérables (Inspector Javert (Anthony Perkins))
- Sitting Bull (Major Robert Parrish (Dale Robertson))
- The Thief of Paris (Georges Randal (Jean-Paul Belmondo))
- The Untouchables (Eliot Ness (Robert Stack))

==== Animation ====
- The Hunchback of Notre Dame (Judge Claude Frollo (speaking voice))
- SWAT Kats: The Radical Squadron (Dr. Harley Street)

== Honors ==
- Medal with Purple Ribbon (1996)
- Order of the Rising Sun, 4th Class, Gold Rays with Rosette (2002)
- Art Festival Award- Incentive award
- Arts Reward - Minister of Education Award
- Kinokuniya Theater Award
