= Eros + Massacre =

1970 Japanese film

- DVD cover
- Directed by: Yoshishige Yoshida
- Written by: Masahiro Yamada; Yoshishige Yoshida
- Produced by: Yoshishige Yoshida; Shinji Soshizaki
- Starring: Mariko Okada; Toshiyuki Hosokawa; Yūko Kusunoki; Kazuko Ineno
- Cinematography: Motokichi Hasegawa
- Music by: Toshi Ichiyanagi
- Production company: Gendai Eigasha
- Distributed by: Art Theatre Guild
- Release dates: 15 October 1969 (France); 14 March 1970 (Japan)
- Running time: 167 mins. (Japanese theatrical cut); 216 mins. (original cut)
- Country: Japan
- Language: Japanese

Eros + Massacre (Japanese: エロス＋虐殺, Hepburn: Erosu purasu gyakusatsu) is a 1969 Japanese experimental drama film directed by Yoshishige Yoshida, who wrote it in cooperation with Masahiro Yamada. The film is a biography of anarchist Sakae Ōsugi, who was murdered by the Japanese military police in 1923 (see Amakasu Incident). It is the first film in a loose trilogy, followed by Heroic Purgatory (1970) and Coup d'État (1973).

== Plot ==
The story tells of Ōsugi's relationship with three women: Hori Yasuko, his wife; Noe Itō, his third lover, who was to die with him; and his jealous, second lover, Itsuko Masaoka (modeled after Ichiko Kamichika), a militant feminist who attempts to kill him in a tea house in 1916. Parallel to the telling of Ōsugi's life, two students (Eiko and Wada) do research on the political theories and ideas of free love that he upheld. Some of the characters from the past and from the present meet and engage the themes of the film.

The film begins with Eiko, a student, learning about Noe Itō's life by interviewing her daughter, Mako. Eiko is shown to believe in Ōsugi's principles of free love. She is also connected with an underground prostitution ring and is questioned by a police inspector. Wada, another student, spends his time philosophizing with Eiko and playing with fire. The two sometimes engage in re-enactments of lives of famous revolutionaries and martyrs.

Their story is interwoven with the retelling of Ōsugi's later years and death. The scene where Itsuko tries to take Ōsugi's life is retold several times with differing results. The 1920s scenes in general follow a different pace than the 1960s scenes, both musically and stylistically.

In the final scene, Eiko's lover, a film director, commits suicide by hanging himself with a length of film. Eiko and Wada gather all of the 1920s characters and take a group picture of them. The two then leave the building.

== Cast ==
- Mariko Okada as Noe Itō/Mako
- Toshiyuki Hosokawa as Sakae Ōsugi
- Yuko Kusunoki as Itsuko Masaoka
- Etsushi Takahashi as Jun Tsuji
- Toshiko Ii as Eiko Sokutai
- Daijirō Harada as Kiwamu Wada

== Release ==
The film was first released in France in a version running three and a half hours. Due to Ichiko Kamichika's protests against what she saw as a violation of privacy, threatening to sue Yoshida, the film was shortened to three hours for the Japanese release and Kamichika's name changed to Itsuko Masaoka. Kamichika was still adamant to stop the release, and sued in what became known as the "Eros Plus Massacre Case". The court found in favor of Yoshida.

Both the Japanese theatrical cut and the original cut were released by Arrow Films on Blu-ray in 2017 as part of the Love + Anarchism box set. A DVD version of the original cut had previously been released in Japan in 2005.

== Style and themes ==
Instead of using flashback sequences, Yoshida interweaves the two levels of narrated time, while visual elements such as the repeated use of reflections of the characters or collapsing shoji screens accentuate the fusion of reality and fiction and the illusionary nature of truth. Through the rejection of a linear narrative, the films depicts Itō as derived from Eiko's imagination. Mathieu Capel writes, "[…] does the past exist beyond the words that state and organize it? Is what we call "world" anything but a tracery of "world views"? Then, how unlikely would it be for Itō Noe and Eiko to meet in a contemporary setting?" For Isolde Standish, Yoshida, by emphasising effect and visual style and denying the viewer's expectations, attempts to communicate to the audience that what they see on the screen are fabrications which need to be completed by their interpretation. Yoshida stated in an interview: "I adopted a style that brings Osugi back into the contemporary period. […] Ultimately, the frames of past and present completely disappear, in this way, there is the sense that contemporary young women and Noe Itō are able to converse. Therefore, this is one way in which I challenge history."

Although the film is a biography of Ōsugi, Yoshida states that he didn't focus on Ōsugi as a historical character per se, but rather on how reflecting on the present and the future can change the present and the world. In a 1970 interview for the magazine Cahiers du Cinéma, Yoshida explained: "In making this film, I wanted to transform the legend of Osugi by means of the imaginary. Sure enough, Osugi was oppressed by the power of the state in his political activities. But most of all, he spoke of free love, which has the power to destroy the monogamous structure, then the family, and finally the state. And it was this very escalation that the state could not allow. It was because of this crime of the imaginary (or "imaginary crime") that the state massacred Osugi. Osugi was someone who envisioned a future."

== Legacy ==
Eros + Massacre was screened in the theatrical version at the Centre Pompidou, Paris, in 2008 and at the Harvard Film Archive in 2009 as part of retrospectives on Yoshida's work. It was included in the British Film Institute's "The best Japanese film of every year – from 1925 to now" list.

Film historian David Desser named his book Eros Plus Massacre: An Introduction to the Japanese New Wave Cinema after the film.

== Bibliography ==
- Desser, David (1988). Eros Plus Massacre: An Introduction to the Japanese New Wave Cinema. Indiana University Press. ISBN 978-0-253-20469-1.
- Standish, Isolde (2011). Politics, Porn and Protest: Japanese Avant-Garde Cinema in the 1960s and 1970s. A&C Black. ISBN 9780826439017.
