= Flame and Women =

- Film poster
- Directed by: Yoshishige Yoshida
- Screenplay by: Yoshishige Yoshida; Masahiro Yamada; Tsutomu Tamura
- Produced by: Saburō Mutō; Akira Oda
- Starring: Mariko Okada; Isao Kimura; Mayumi Ogawa; Takeshi Kusaka; Kazuo Kitamura
- Cinematography: Yuji Okumura
- Edited by: Kazuo Ōta
- Music by: Teizo Matsumura
- Production company: Gendai Eigasha
- Distributed by: Shochiku
- Release date: 1 December 1967 (Japan)
- Running time: 101 minutes
- Country: Japan
- Language: Japanese

Flame and Women (Japanese: 炎と女, Hepburn: Honō to onna), also known as Impasse and Flame of Feeling, is a 1967 Japanese New Wave black and white drama film co-written and directed by Yoshishige Yoshida. The film is a nonlinear narrative about a couple whose marriage disintegrates after they conceive a child through artificial insemination. It stars Mariko Okada in the lead role (her fifth collaboration with Yoshida), in addition to Isao Kimura, Mayumi Ogawa, Takeshi Kusaka and Kazuo Kitamura. The film's score was composed by Teizo Matsumura. Flame and Women was theatrically released by Shochiku on 1 December 1967, in Japan.

== Plot ==
Shipbuilding engineer Shingo Ibuki and his wife, Ritsuko, have a son, Takashi, who is one year and seven months old. Their middle-class family seems happy from the outside. However, Takashi was conceived through artificial insemination due to Shingo's infertility, while Ritsuko had wanted a natural birth. Though the procedure was a success, it has caused their marriage to stagnate. Shingo's friend Dr. Fujikida, who performed the insemination process, his former apprentice Ken Sakaguchi, and Ken's wife Shina, frequent the Ibukis' home. Shingo knows that Ken, a poor medical student at the time, was the sperm donor, yet maintains a friendship with him. At the same time, Ritsuko nourishes a burgeoning and irrepressible desire for Ken.

One day, Takashi disappears. When Shingo returns home from work, he finds Fujikida, Ken and Ritsuko present, and confronts Ritsuko over the disappearance. Ritsuko recounts that Fujikida, Ken and Shina had visited earlier that day, and while Ritsuko was talking with the two men, Shina had taken Takashi. Ritsuko spotted Shina in the act but couldn't bring herself to stop her. She is unable to explain why to her husband. After hearing her story, Shingo, Ken and Fujikida remain silent, their feelings complicated. Secretly, Ritsuko knows that Ken is Takashi's biological father. She is also aware that Shina believes Takashi was the child of an adulterous affair between Ritsuko and Ken. Ritsuko feels that, in order to be certain that Takashi is her child, she has to clarify her relationship with Ken. Soon after the group's discussion, Shina returns with Takashi. Ken confronts his wife, but Shina will not say why she took Takashi.

The next day, Ritsuko invites Ken to the Ibuki villa in Karuizawa. Ken agrees, and they leave for the resort town. Meanwhile, Shina tries to seduce Shingo. After failing to do so, Shina proclaims her intent to take revenge on Ritsuko for her perceived adultery. Shingo tells Shina everything, revealing that Ken had merely sold his sperm to the couple. At the villa, Ritsuko sleeps with Ken. After doing so, she comes to the conclusion that Takashi belongs to neither Shingo nor Ken, but to her alone.

The next morning, Ritsuko finds Shingo's car waiting for her in front of the house. Ritsuko tells Shingo she will go home with him. Shingo smiles, a look of relief on his face. He tells Ken, "There is no doubt that Takashi is my child." The three leave as if nothing had happened.

== Cast ==
- Mariko Okada as Ritsuko Ibuki
- Isao Kimura as Shingo Ibuki
- Mayumi Ogawa as Shina Sakaguchi
- Takeshi Kusaka as Ken Sakaguchi
- Kazuo Kitamura as Fujikida
- Toshiyuki Hosokawa as Man
- Misao Hayase as Akane Egawa
- Yukio Kubota as Takashi (uncredited)
- Sachiko Matsushita
- Kikuo Kaneuchi
- Kyōko Seki
- Tōru Ishikawa
- Aoi Nakajima
- Midori Tamai
- Kazuko Kui
- Izuru Ogawa

== Release ==
Flame and Women was theatrically released by Shochiku on 1 December 1967, in Japan.

The film was later released to DVD on 25 February 2006.

== Critical analysis ==
The Japan Society screened Flame and Women on 14 April 2010 as part of the Globus film series "Mad, Bad... & Dangerous to Know: Three Untamed Beauties". The Society called it "a moral furnace of a film, stoked with guilt and vengefulness." They also wrote that the film's structure "artfully shuffles the time scheme," while its portrayal of artificial insemination verges on science fiction. The Japan Society also praised Okada's "highly nuanced and restrained performance."

Film at Lincoln Center later screened the film from 1–8 December 2023 as part of its series "The Radical Cinema of Kijū Yoshida". The Center wrote that the film marked a return to melodrama for Yoshida, "this time synthesizing elements of the horror film in the process". They also called the film one of Yoshida's "most visually fragmentary works", while praising the manner in which the filmmaker "tease[s] out the enigmatic, subterranean currents of its protagonist's predicament".

In 2013, Pulp International stated that Flame and Women is "an important film about the role women were expected to play in Japanese society and how suffocating it could be".
