= Farewell to the Summer Light =

- Film poster
- Directed by: Yoshishige Yoshida
- Screenplay by: Yoshishige Yoshida; Masahiro Yamada; Ryusei Hasegawa
- Produced by: Shinji Soshizaki
- Starring: Mariko Okada; Tadashi Yokouchi; Paul Beauvais; Hélène Soubielle
- Cinematography: Yuji Okumura
- Edited by: Saki Nagase
- Music by: Toshi Ichiyanagi
- Production company: Gendai Eigasha
- Distributed by: Art Theatre Guild
- Release date: 31 December 1968 (Japan)
- Running time: 96 minutes
- Country: Japan
- Language: Japanese

Farewell to the Summer Light (Japanese: さらば夏の光, Hepburn: Saraba natsu no hikari) is a 1968 Japanese New Wave romantic drama film co-written and directed by Yoshishige Yoshida. Its story follows two Japanese people on a tour of Europe who become romantically entangled while dealing with mutual trauma over the atomic bombing of Nagasaki. The film stars Mariko Okada and Tadashi Yokouchi in the lead roles, in addition to Paul Beauvais and Hélène Soubielle. Its score was composed by Toshi Ichiyanagi. Farewell to the Summer Light was theatrically released by Art Theatre Guild on 31 December 1968, in Japan.

== Plot ==
In the early summer of 1968, professor Makoto Kawamura walks through a Lisbon square, where flowers are in full bloom under the bright sunlight. He is touring Europe in order to locate a cathedral, which served as inspiration for a Nagasaki church built by Portuguese missionaries centuries prior. The church was destroyed in the atomic bombing of Nagasaki. In the square he meets Naoko Toba, a married expat who specializes in the import-export of handicraft goods. Naoko, feeling spontaneous attraction to Kawamura, offers to help him look for the cathedral.

Their search takes them to Spain, where the two encounter a man and woman arguing fiercely on a street corner. The man had stabbed his adulterous wife; the woman is his sister-in-law. While observing the fight, Naoko translates for Kawamura, including the man's cry: "I cannot forgive my wife's infidelity; God knows the truth." Upon hearing this, Naoko feels guilty and reveals that she is living in Paris with her husband, an American citizen named Robert Fitzgerald. Naoko left Japan for France the summer the war ended, as she had lost both her mother and brother in the destruction of Nagasaki. After confessing this, Naoko walks away from Kawamura.

Kawamura meets Naoko again by chance at a café on the Champs-Élysées, where she is talking to her husband. The couple invite Kawamura to their large home on the banks of the Loire River. While staying with them, Kawamura encounters Naoko's sister-in-law, Mary Fitzgerald. He is surprised when Mary mentions Naoko's attraction to him. Soon after, Kawamura travels to Normandy with Naoko. They locate a church perched on a cape, a place full of memories for Naoko. She reveals that she had intended to permanently part ways with Kawamura at the site, as it was the church where she married Robert. However, Kawamura embraces Naoko, and her words fade to a whisper in his arms.

While visiting Stockholm, Kawamura and Naoko's passion ignites. After having sex, Kawamura tells Naoko that he wants to stay with her. He comes to the realization that he had been searching for himself and for love on his journey, not for the cathedral. The next morning, Naoko leaves Kawamura without a word. However, Kawamura retains a faint hope, as Naoko had said she was going to leave her husband.

Soon after, Naoko divorces Robert. However, she does not contact Kawamura in the aftermath. Kawamura tracks Naoko down to Rome, but after confronting her, he accepts that she does not want to be with him. As the setting sun shines upon the two figures standing amidst the ruins of the Temple of Trajan, they part ways.

== Cast ==
- Mariko Okada as Naoko Toba
- Tadashi Yokouchi as Makoto Kawamura
- Paul Beauvais as Robert Fitzgerald
- Hélène Soubielle as Mary Fitzgerald

== Production ==
The film was shot on location throughout Europe in collaboration with Japan Airlines.

== Release ==
Farewell to the Summer Light was theatrically released by Art Theatre Guild on 31 December 1968, in Japan.

The film was later released to DVD on 25 November 2005.

== Critical analysis ==
Film at Lincoln Center screened the film from 1–8 December 2023 as part of its series "The Radical Cinema of Kijū Yoshida". The Center wrote that Farewell to the Summer Light is a "fascinating transitional film for Yoshida", as it previewed the "uncompromisingly political and formally audacious films to come" for the director. While they stated that the film's characters are haunted by the "historic atrocity" of the atomic bombing of Nagasaki, they also noted the filmmaker's interest in the "ravages of global capitalism", and that Yoshida took "a Godard-like interest in the aesthetic textures of a landscape littered with billboards and other forms of advertisement." The Center concluded that the film was, "A singular experiment rendered in bold color".

== See also ==
- Hiroshima mon amour, a 1959 Alain Resnais film.
