= Izakaya Chōji =

- Film poster

Japanese name
- Kanji: 居酒屋兆治
- Directed by: Yasuo Furuhata
- Screenplay by: Yasuko Ōno
- Based on: Izakaya Choji by Hitomi Yamaguchi
- Starring: Ken Takakura; Reiko Ohara; Tokiko Kato
- Cinematography: Daisaku Kimura
- Edited by: Akira Suzuki
- Music by: Takayuki Inoue
- Distributed by: Toho
- Release date: November 12, 1983 (Japan)
- Running time: 125 minutes
- Country: Japan
- Language: Japanese

Izakaya Chōji (居酒屋兆治), also known as Choji Snack Bar, is a 1983 Japanese drama film directed by Yasuo Furuhata. The film is based on a novel of the same name by Hitomi Yamaguchi, originally serialized from 1979 to 1980 and published by Shinchosha as a single volume in 1982. It stars Ken Takakura in the lead role, alongside Reiko Ohara, Tokiko Kato and Juzo Itami. Toho released the film on November 12, 1983, in Japan. The film's theme song, "Jidai okkure no sakaba" (時代おくれの酒場), was written by Tokiko Kato and performed by Takakura.

== Premise ==
Eiji Tōno, nicknamed "Choji", who runs an izakaya in a port town, is forced to reconsider his life choices after the disappearance of a childhood sweetheart. A loyal man with a strict sense of honor, his melancholy reminiscences are reflected in the broken dreams of all his friends.

== Cast ==
- Ken Takakura as Eiji Tōno, aka Choji
- Reiko Ohara as Sayo Kamiya
- Tokiko Kato as Shigeko Tōno
- Kunie Tanaka as Iwashita Yoshiji
- Juzo Itami as Kawahara
- Mitsuru Hirata as Ochi
- Tonpei Hidari as Kamiya Hisataro
- Hōsei Komatsu as Matsumoto, Taxi Driver
- Hideji Ōtaki as Aiba
- Naomi Chiaki as Mineko
- Kei Satō as Yoshino Kozo
- Mako Ishino as Taka
- Masao Komatsu as Akimoto
- Ryō Ikebe as Horie
- Nenji Kobayashi as Detective Ozeki
- Eiji Misato as Inoue
- Haruomi Hosono as Sano
- Eijiro Tono as Matsukawa
- Hatsuo Yamaya as Arita
- Noboru Mitani as Nakamura
- Sabu Kawahara as Kotera
- Yudai Ishiyama as Sawai
- Kaoru Mizuki
- Ryōko Tateishi
- Tetsuya Takeda
- Keiko Yamamoto
- Hiroko Isayama
- Aki Takejō
- Eiji Bandō

== Awards and nominations ==
26th Blue Ribbon Awards

- Won: Best Supporting Actor - Kunie Tanaka

8th Hochi Film Awards

- Won: Best Supporting Actor - Juzo Itami

7th Japan Academy Awards

- Nominated: Best Screenplay – Yasuko Ōno
- Nominated: Best Supporting Actor – Juzo Itami
- Nominated: Best Supporting Actor – Kunie Tanaka
- Nominated: Best Supporting Actress – Tokiko Kato
- Won: Outstanding Achievement in Sound Recording – Kenichi Benitani (also won for The Ballad of Narayama)
