= Woman of the Lake =

1966 Japanese film

- Theatrical release poster
- Directed by: Yoshishige Yoshida
- Screenplay by: Toshiro Ishido; Yasuko Ōno; Yoshishige Yoshida
- Based on: The Lake by Yasunari Kawabata
- Produced by: Akio Komazaki; Keinosuke Kubo
- Starring: Mariko Okada; Shinsuke Ashida; Shigeru Tsuyuguchi
- Cinematography: Tatsuo Suzuki
- Edited by: Sachiko Shimizu
- Music by: Sei Ikeno
- Production company: Gendai Eigasha
- Distributed by: Shochiku
- Release date: 27 August 1966 (Japan)
- Running time: 98 minutes
- Country: Japan
- Language: Japanese

Woman of the Lake (Japanese: 女のみづうみ, Hepburn: Onna no mizuumi) is a 1966 Japanese drama film directed by Yoshishige Yoshida. It is based on Yasunari Kawabata's 1954 novel The Lake.

== Plot ==
Miyako, comfortably married to businessman Yuzo Mizuki, is having an affair with Kitano, who is himself engaged. She allows Kitano to take nude pictures of her, but the photos end up in possession of Ginpei, who had been waywarding her. Miyako agrees to meet Ginpei, who threatens to inform her husband of the affair, in Katamayazu, Lake Shibayama (Ishikawa Prefecture). She is followed by Kitano and still later Kitano's fiancée Machie.

Ginpei has prints made of the negatives at a local photo shop in Katamayazu. The shop owner blackmails Miyako, but while he is satisfied with money, Ginpei wants to possess Miyako, whom he feels attracted to since he first saw her with Kitano. At the same time, he confesses that he might be less in love with Miyako herself than with her image. After sleeping with Ginpei, she pushes him off a cliff. When she returns to her hotel room, she is confronted with her husband, who has been informed of the affair and her whereabouts by Kitano. On the way back to Tokyo with her husband, Miyako spots Ginpei, who has survived, on the train. She explains to Ginpei that her attempt to kill him did not happen out of hatred. Ginpei turns away from her, leaving her behind alone.

== Cast ==
- Mariko Okada as Miyako
- Shinsuke Ashida as Yuzo
- Shigeru Tsuyuguchi as Ginpei
- Tamotsu Hayakawa as Kitano
- Keiko Natsu as Machie

== Legacy ==
Woman of the Lake was screened at the Centre Pompidou, Paris, in 2008 as part of a retrospective on Yoshida's work.
