= Miyoko Akaza =

Japanese actress

- Born: February 10, 1944 (age 82); Aichi, Japan
- Years active: 1967-present
- Spouse: Toshiya Fujita

Miyoko Akaza (赤座 美代子, Akaza Miyoko; born February 10, 1944 in Aichi) is a Japanese actress. She was married to Toshiya Fujita.

== Filmography ==
- Libido (Sei no kigen) (1967)
- Affair in the Snow (Juhyo no yoromeki) (1968)
- A Tale of Peonies and Lanterns (Botan-dôrô) (1968)
- Nihiki no yojimbo (1968)
- The Blazing Continent (Moeru tairiku) (1968)
- Furyo bancho okuri ookami (1969)
- Fight for the Glory (Eiko eno kurohyo) (1969)
- Our Wilderness (Oretachi no kôya) (1969)
- Gokudo kyojo tabi (1970)
- Seijuku (1971)
- Shadow of Deception (Naikai no wa) (1971)
- Confessions Among Actresses (Kokuhakuteki joyûron) (1971)
- Lady Snowblood (Shurayukihime) (1973)
- Violent Streets (1974)
- Seishun no satetsu (1974)
- Virgin Blues (1974)
- Panic in High School (Koko dai panikku) (1978)
- Motto shinayaka ni, motto shitataka ni (1979)
- White Love (Howaito rabu) (1979)
- Masho no natsu - Yotsuya kaidan yori (1981)
- School in the Crosshairs (Nerawareta gakuen) (1981)
- The Wild Daisy (Nogiku no haka) (1981)
- The Second Love (1983)
- Daburu beddo (1983)
- Sukanpin Walk (1984)
- F2 Grand Prix (1984)
- The Island Closest to Heaven (Tengoku ni ichiban chikai shima) (1984)
- April Fish (Shigatsu no sakana) (1986)
- Deshima (1987)
- Hana no Furu Gogo (1989)
- Gattubî - Bokura wa kono natsu nekutai wo suru (1990)
- Kaseifu ha mita! 9 (1991)
- Haruka, nosutarujii (1993)
- Shinonomerô onna no ran (1994)
- Goodbye for Tomorrow (Ashita) (1995)
- Sore ga kotae da! (1997) – TV series
- Yome wa mitsuboshi (2001) – TV series
- My Lover Is a Sniper: The Movie (Koibito wa sunaipâ: Gekijô-ban) (2004)
- Gosuto shauto (2004)
- The Reason (Riyû) (2004)
- Hoshi hitotsu no yoru (2007) – TV series
