= The Second Love =

- Film poster
- Directed by: Yōichi Higashi
- Screenplay by: Akiko Tanaka; Yōichi Higashi
- Produced by: Toru Yoshida; Katsuhiro Maeda
- Starring: Reiko Ohara; Kaoru Kobayashi; Miyoko Akaza; Kenzō Kawarasaki; Michiko Araki
- Cinematography: Koichi Kawakami
- Edited by: Keiko Ichihara
- Music by: Michi Tanaka
- Production companies: Gentosha; Toei Company
- Distributed by: Toei Company
- Release date: April 8, 1983 (Japan)
- Running time: 103 minutes
- Country: Japan
- Language: Japanese
- Budget: ¥200 million

The Second Love (Japanese: セカンド・ラブ, Hepburn: Sekando rabu) is a 1983 Japanese drama film directed by Yōichi Higashi and co-written by Higashi with Akiko Tanaka. It tells the story of a remarried artist who discovers a corpse in her kitchen. The film stars Reiko Ohara in the lead role, in addition to Kaoru Kobayashi, Miyoko Akaza, Kenzō Kawarasaki and Michiko Araki. Michi Tanaka composed the film's score. The Second Love was theatrically released by Toei Company on April 8, 1983, in Japan.

== Premise ==
Kazumi is a 32 year old artist. She was previously married to a man nearly 20 years older than her, and she remarried two years ago to her current husband, Hideo, an architect. Kazumi brings the wisdom of an adult to their relationship, while Hideo, younger and more temperamental, frequently suspects Kazumi of infidelity. The couple have been receiving frequent, threatening phone calls from an unknown source. Hideo suspects that the calls are from Kazumi's ex-husband. Meanwhile, Kazumi notices signs of pregnancy, but is unable to tell Hideo.

As she busies herself preparing for an upcoming solo exhibition, Kazumi hopes that her work will finally be recognized. Her wishes come true and the event is a success, leaving Kazumi relieved. A young woman named Nobuko, claiming to be a freelance writer for a women's magazine, interviews her. However, when Nobuko learns that Hideo is about to ride back home on his motorcycle, she clings to him and asks to see the house he is building. Kazumi goes off to celebrate the exhibition's success with her friends. But when she returns home alone, she discovers a man's corpse in the kitchen.

== Cast ==
- Reiko Ohara as Kazumi Hyuga
- Kaoru Kobayashi as Hideo Hyuga
- Miyoko Akaza as Miki, Kazumi's Older Sister
- Kenzō Kawarasaki as Hideo's Older Brother
- Michiko Araki as Shiho, Kazumi's Mother
- Hatsunori Hasegawa
- Reiko Nakamura as Nobuko
- Tokuma Nishioka as Isomura
- Akiko Kitamura
- Kōen Okumura as Tatsumi, Hideo's Father
- Noboru Matsuhashi
- Shinobu Tsuruta
- Sakura Kamo
- Joji Ai as Tomoharu

== Production ==
The film was made for ¥200 million, a significantly higher budget than Higashi's previous films. From that amount, Higashi was paid ¥5 million for his work.

Filming began on February 9, 1983. The film was shot on location in Kyoto and Tokyo. The Second Love marked the feature film debut of actor Tokuma Nishioka.

At the time of production, The Second Love was Reiko Ohara's first film in five years. The film was initially titled Mature Woman, but Ohara refused to sign on until the title was changed. Higashi considered the alternate title Married Life before settling on The Second Love. The film's final title is similar to that of the song "Second Love" by Akina Nakamori; Kinema Junpo reported that Nakamori was originally offered the lead role and theme song, though both Toei and Nakamori's agency denied the report.

Ohara performed her first sex scenes in the film, which caused a dispute between her and Toei and made headlines in Japanese media. She had agreed to star in the production because it was a "women's film" directed by Higashi. Though the script contained sex scenes, Higashi agreed to Ohara's request to not show her breasts in the film. However, Toei's producers hoped that Higashi could convince her to perform nude once she arrived on set. In addition, Toei asked to take nude stills of Ohara during filming for publicity purposes, but Ohara refused this as well. Higashi later criticized Toei for their treatment of Ohara. Upon completion of filming, Ohara reportedly stated, "I will never show my nude body again. I'm not the kind of actress who relies on nudity."

Ohara reportedly did not tell her husband at the time, Shinichi Mori, that the film included sex scenes. When this was reported in the media, Mori publicly expressed disapproval.

== Release ==
The Second Love was theatrically released by Toei Company on April 8, 1983, in Japan. It was shown as a double feature with Praying Mantis, another Toei film. The film was later released to DVD by Toei Video on August 6, 2010.

== Reception ==
In a 2009 obituary for Ohara in Kinema Junpo, writer Makoto Kanazawa commented on the film: "Director [Higashi's] aim was to portray the subtle differences in the lives of a couple who find meaning in their work, but the modern character [Ohara] played here did not mesh with [her] straightforward Edokko temperament or her somewhat solitary aura, resulting in an unsatisfactory performance."
