= The Scent of Incense =

1964 Japanese film

- Film poster

Japanese name
- Kanji: 香華
- Directed by: Keisuke Kinoshita
- Written by: Keisuke Kinoshita (screenplay); Sawako Ariyoshi (novel)
- Produced by: Keisuke Kinoshita; Masao Shirai
- Starring: Mariko Okada; Nobuko Otowa; Kinuyo Tanaka
- Cinematography: Hiroshi Kusuda
- Edited by: Yoshi Sugihara
- Music by: Tadashi Kinoshita
- Production company: Shōchiku
- Distributed by: Shōchiku
- Release date: 24 May 1964 (Japan)
- Running time: 204 minutes
- Country: Japan
- Language: Japanese

The Scent of Incense (Japanese: 香華, Hepburn: Kōge) (Note: The Japanese title refers to incense and flowers presented as offerings at a Buddhist altar.) is a 1964 Japanese drama film based on a novel by Sawako Ariyoshi and directed by Keisuke Kinoshita. It was one of Kinoshita's last cinema productions before working mainly for television.

== Plot ==
Spanning in time from the Russo-Japanese War (1904–1905) to the post World War II era, The Scent of Incense depicts the ongoing conflicts in the troubled relationship between Tomoko and her mother Ikuyo. Ikuyo, who is about to remarry, leaves Tomoko with her grandmother Tsuna, only to sell her to a geisha house after Tsuna's death. When the women meet again, Ikuyo has herself turned to prostitution. Tomoko, now a geisha, starts a relationship with cadet Ezaki with the prospect of marriage, but his family denies its approval due to Ikuyo's profession. Having become independent as the madam of her own geisha house, Tomoko loses her property in the 1923 earthquake. While her mother marries a third time, this time former servant Hachiran, Tomoko refuses the offer of Nozawa to become his mistress. Amidst the ruins of a bomb-ridden Tokyo, where Tomoko and Ikuyo live in a cellar, the mother is reunited with Hachiran who had gone missing during the Second World War. Tomoko hears of the imprisonment and death sentence of Ezaki for a war crime, but when she is finally admitted to visit him in jail after months of waiting, he pretends not to know her. After Ikuyo's death in a traffic accident while Tomoko is in hospital, Hachiran returns to his home town. The film closes with Tomoko having Ikuyo's name added to the family shrine.

== Cast ==
- Mariko Okada as Tomoko
- Nobuko Otowa as Ikuyo
- Kinuyo Tanaka as Tsuna
- Go Kato as Ezaki
- Haruko Sugimura as Taromaru
- Eiji Okada as Nozawa
- Kazuo Kitamura as Keisuke
- Bunta Sugawara as Sugiura
- Masakazu Tamura as Ezaki's son
- Taketoshi Naito as Murata
- Katsutoshi Arata as Otaki
- Kaneko Iwasaki as Yasuko
- Norihei Miki as Hachiro
- Eijirō Yanagi as Kano
- Yoshio Inaba
- Jun Hamamura
