= Coup d'État (1973 film) =

1973 Japanese film

- Film poster

Japanese name
- Kanji: 戒厳令
Transcriptions
- Revised Hepburn: Kaigenrei
- Directed by: Yoshishige Yoshida
- Written by: Minoru Betsuyaku
- Produced by: Mariko Okada; Takashi Ueno; Kinshiro Kuzui
- Starring: Rentarō Mikuni
- Cinematography: Motokichi Hasegawa
- Music by: Toshi Ichiyanagi
- Production companies: Gendai Eigasha; Art Theatre Guild
- Release date: 7 July 1973 (Japan)
- Running time: 110 minutes
- Country: Japan
- Language: Japanese

Coup d'État (Japanese: 戒厳令, Hepburn: Kaigenrei), also titled Martial Law, is a 1973 Japanese drama film directed by Yoshishige Yoshida. It is based on the life of nationalist intellectual Ikki Kita and an account of the attempted overthrow of the Japanese government by a group of army officers on 26 February 1936. It is the third film in a loose trilogy, preceded by Eros + Massacre (1969) and Heroic Purgatory (1970).

== Cast ==
- Rentarō Mikuni as Kazuki Kitamura
- Yasuyo Matsumura as Suzu, Kazuki's wife
- Yasuo Miyake as Young soldier
- Akiko Kurano as Soldier's wife
- Tadahiko Sugano as Nishida
- Taketoshi Naitō as Army officer
- Kei Iinuma as Iwasa
- Kazunaga Tsuji as Heigo Asahi
- Masako Yagi as Heigo's sister

== Background ==
Coup d'État was Japan's submission to the 46th Academy Awards for the Academy Award for Best Foreign Language Film, but was not accepted as a nominee.

== Legacy ==
Coup d'État was screened at the Harvard Film Archive in 2009 as part of a retrospective on Yoshida's work.

== See also ==
- List of submissions to the 46th Academy Awards for Best Foreign Language Film
- List of Japanese submissions for the Academy Award for Best Foreign Language Film
