= Toshi Ichiyanagi =

Japanese composer and pianist (1933–2022)

- 一柳 慧
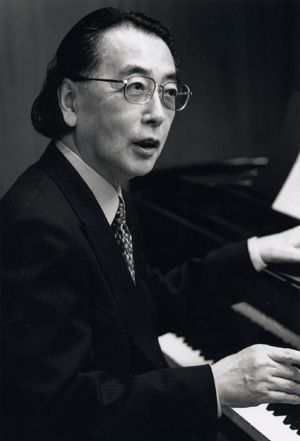
- Born: 4 February 1933; Kobe, Japan
- Died: 7 October 2022 (aged 89); Tokyo, Japan
- Occupations: Composer; Pianist
- Years active: 1954–2017
- Notable work: Kaika
- Spouses: Yoko Ono (m. 1956; div. 1963); Sumiko Matsuda (m. 1963; died 1993)
- Children: 1

Toshi Ichiyanagi (一柳 慧, Ichiyanagi Toshi; 4 February 1933 – 7 October 2022) was a Japanese avant-garde composer and pianist. One of the leading composers in Japan during the postwar era, Ichiyanagi worked in a range of genres, composing Western-style operas, orchestral and chamber works, as well as compositions using traditional Japanese instruments. Ichiyanagi is known for incorporating avant-garde techniques into his works, such as chance music, extended technique, and nontraditional scoring. Ichiyanagi was married to artist Yoko Ono from 1956 to 1962.

== Early life and education ==
Ichiyanagi was born in Kobe on 4 February 1933. He studied composition with Tomojirō Ikenouchi, Kishio Hirao, and John Cage. From 1954 to 1960, Ichiyanagi resided in New York City, where he studied at the Juilliard School and The New School for Social Research.

Ichiyanagi was married to Yoko Ono from 1956 to 1962.

== Career ==
Returning to Japan in 1960, Ichiyanagi collaborated with the anti-art collective Neo-Dada Organizers.

Many of Ichiyanagi's early scores use graphic notation: Sapporo (1963) is one of the better known examples. Another notable early work is the 1960 composition Kaiki, which combined Japanese instruments, shō and koto, and western instruments, harmonica and saxophone. Another work, Distance (1961), required the performers to play from a distance of three meters from their instruments. Anima 7 (1964) stated that chosen action should be performed "as slowly as possible". In 1963, Ichiyanagi co-founded an avant-garde music collective called New Direction along with fellow composers Takehisa Kosugi, Yūji Takahashi, and Kenji Kobayashi, and others. The group disbanded in the late 1960s when most of its members relocated to New York, while Ichiyanagi remained in Japan.

Ichiyanagi's later works shifted away from experimental means toward more conventional forms, including symphonies, operas and concertos. He was the recipient of the 33rd Suntory Music Award (2001) and the Foundation for Contemporary Arts John Cage Award (2018). He has been honored with Japan's Order of Culture.

== Personal life and death ==
Ichiyanagi's father, Shinji, was a cellist, while his mother, Mitsuko, gave piano lessons in their home and was her son's first piano teacher. After Ichiyanagi's marriage to Yoko Ono ended in 1962, he was married a second time in 1963 to Sumiko Matsuda, a writer, who died in 1993. They had a son, Kei (b. 1964), who is still living as of 2022.

Ichiyanagi died in Tokyo on 7 October 2022, at the age of 89.

== Works ==
As listed in Schott Music catalogue:

=== Operas ===
- Opera “From the Works of Tadanori Yokoo” (electronic music) (1969)
- Hiraizumi Enjo (1989)
- The Last Will of Fire (1995)
- Momo (1995/98)
- Hikari (2002)
- Ikuta-gawa Monogatari (2004)
- White Nights (2005)

=== Orchestral works ===
- Asma for piano and orchestra (1962)
- The Field for koto and orchestra (1964)
- Life Music for modulators, tape and orchestra (1965)
- Up To Date Applause for orchestra, rock band and tape (1968)
- Chi for noh flute and orchestra (1973)
- In the Reflection of Lighting Image for percussion and orchestra (1980)
- Piano Concerto No. 1 "Reminiscences of Space" (1981)
- Engen for koto and orchestra (1982/86)
- Violin Concerto "Circulating Scenery" (1983)
- Paganini Personal for marimba and orchestra (1983–86)
- Time Surrounding for percussion and orchestra (1984)
- Symphony for Chamber Orchestra "Time Current" (1986)
- Interspace for string orchestra (1987)
- Piano Concerto No. 2 "Winter Portrait" (1987)
- Symphony "Berlin Renshi" for soprano, tenor, orchestra (1988)
- Voices from the Environment (1989)
- Symphonic Movement "Kyoto" (1989)
- Concerto for Koto and Chamber Orchestra "The Origin" (1989)
- Existence for organ and orchestra (1989)
- Piano Concerto No. 3 "Cross Water Roads" (1991)
- Luminous Space for sho, ondes martenot and orchestra (1991)
- Interplay for flute and string orchestra (1992)
- Symphony for Chamber Orchestra No. 2 "Undercurrent" (1993)
- Cosmos Ceremony for ryuteki, sho and orchestra (1993)
- Symphony No. 4 "Recollection of Reminiscence Beyond" (1994)
- "Coexistence" for shakuhachi and string orchestra (1994)
- Symphony No. 3 "Inner Communications" (1995)
- Coexistence for ondes martenot and orchestra (1996)
- Symphony No. 5 "Time Perspective" – on the theme of opera Momo (1997)
- Symphony No. 2 "Undercurrent" (1997)
- Coexistence for orchestra (1997)
- Bridging (2001)
- Symphony No. 6 "A Hundred Years From Now" (2001)
- Between Space and Time for chamber orchestra (2001)
- Returning to Sounds Environment for shakuhachi and orchestra (2002)
- To the Memory of Nugshead for wind orchestra (2003)
- Concertato for harp and chamber orchestra (2004)
- Symphony No. 7 "Ishikawa Paraphrase" (2007)
- Piano Concerto No. 4 "Jazz" (2009)
- Piano Concerto No. 5 "Finland" (2011)
- Symphony No. 8 "Revelation 2011" (2011/12)
- Concerto for marimba and orchestra (2012)
- Symphony No. 9 "Diaspora" (2014)
- Piano Concerto No. 6 "Zen" (2016)
- Symphony No. 10 "Scenes of Various Memories" (2016)
- Double Concerto for violin, cello and orchestra (2017)

=== Chamber works ===
- Sonata for violin and piano (1954)
- Trio for 2 flutes and harp (1956)
- String Quartet (1957)
- Stanzas for string instrument(s) (1960)
- For Strings (1961)
- Duet for piano and string instrument(s) (1961)
- Sapporo for any number of players up to fifteen (1962)
- Activities for brass instruments (1962)
- String Quartet No. 1 (1964)
- Modulator for Japanese instruments, string instruments, piano and modulator (1966)
- Appearance for 3 players and 2 operators (1967)
- Distance for noh flute, noh performer and ensemble (1978)
- Scenes I for violin and piano (1978)
- Scenes II for violin and piano (1979)
- Recurrence for flute, clarinet, percussion, harp, piano, violin and cello (1979)
- Wa for 13-string koto, 17-string koto, piano and percussion (1981)
- Time in Tree, Time in Water for percussion and piano (1981)
- Scenes IV for violin and piano (1981)
- Before Darkness Appears for accordion and piano (1981)
- Scenes V for violin and piano (1982)
- Paganini Personal for marimba and piano (1982)
- Flowers Blooming in summer for harp and piano (1982)
- Wind trace for three keyboard percussion (marimba, vibraphone and antique cymbal) (1984)
- Piano Quintet "Prāna" (1985)
- Yami o Irodoru Mono for 2 violins and piano (revised 2006 for 2 violins, cello and piano) (1985)
- Yochô for ryuteki and piano (1985)
- Présage for 6 ondes martinots (1986)
- String Quartet No. 2 "Interspace" (1986)
- Interspace for sho and harp (1986)
- Transfiguration of the Moon for sho and violin (1988)
- Ten, Zui, Ho, Gyaku for shakuhachi and ondes martenot (1988)
- Wind Gradation for ryuteki and piano (1989)
- Troposphere for ondes martenot and marimba (1990)
- Interrelation I for cello and piano (1991)
- Trio Interlink for violin, piano and percussion (1990)
- Aquascape for marimba, flute, piano and 2 percussions (1992)
- Cosmos of Coexistence for marimba and piano (1992)
- Reflection for 9 players (1992)
- Brightening Wind for sho and piano (1992)
- Tenryuji for ryuteki, sho, shakuhachi, koto, ondes martenot and percussion (1992)
- Intercross for violin and piano (1993)
- Toki Sayuru for koto and piano (1993)
- String Quartet No. 3 "Inner-landscape" (1994)
- Trio Fantasy for piano, violin and cello (1994)
- Cosmic Harmony for cello and piano (1995)
- Music for Violin, Shô and Piano (1995)
- Existence −In Memory of Kuniharu Akiyama− for clarinet and piano (1997)
- Interrelation II for violin and piano (1998)
- Mirage for English horn and double bass (1998)
- Mirage for accordion and harpsichord (1998)
- Mirage for sho and harpsichord (1998)
- Mirage for shakuhachi and piano (1998)
- String Quartet No. 4 "In the Forest" (1999)
- Metamorphosis for bassoon quartet (1999)
- Piano Quintet "Bridging" (2001)
- Spiritual Sight II for gagaku, reigaku, shomyo and cello (2001)
- Encounter for cello, ancient instruments, gagaku and shomyo (2002)
- Space Line for viol consort (2005)
- Variation "White Nights" for percussion ensemble (2006)
- Space Scene for flute, clarinet, violin, cello, accordion and piano (2006)
- Resonant Space for clarinet and piano (2007)
- Circular Space for flute, clarinet, cello, piano and percussion (2008)
- Hen'yo suru No-Kukan for Noh performers and 2 pianos (2008)
- Trio Webster for flute, clarinet and piano (2008)
- Paganini Personal for violin and piano (2011)
- Duo Interchange for violin and cello (2011)

=== Works for keyboard ===
- Music for Piano No. 1 – No. 7 (1959–61)
- Piano Media for piano (1972)
- Bi no Bi for piano (1975)
- Multiple Spaces for organ (1976)
- Time Sequence for piano (1976)
- Two Existence for 2 pianos (1980)
- Cloud Atlas I–X for piano (1985–99)
- Inter Konzert for piano (1987)
- Piano Nature for piano (1989)
- Inexhaustible Fountain for piano (1990)
- Dimensions for organ (1990)
- Fantasy for organ (1992)
- Farewell to... – To the Memory of Luigi Nono for piano (1992)
- In Memory of John Cage for piano (1992)
- Imaginary Scenes for piano (1995)
- Piano Space for piano (2001)
- Piano Poem for piano (2003)
- Sen no Image no tame ni for 2 pianos (2009)
- Piano Craft for piano (2010)
- Sonatina for piano (2010)
- Paganini Personal for 2 pianos (2011)
- Waltz Solemnity for piano (2012)

=== Works for other instruments ===
- Vein of Sounds for harp (1972)
- Arrangements for percussion (1972)
- Scenes III for solo violin (1980)
- Wind Nuance for flute (1980)
- Portrait of Forest for solo marimba (1983)
- Cloud Figures for solo oboe (1984)
- Wind Trace for 3 keyboard percussion players (1984)
- Perspectives for solo violin (1986)
- Still Time III for harp (1987)
- Wind Stream for flute (1989)
- The Source for marimba (1989)
- Friends for violin (1990)
- Aki o Utu Oto for marimba (1991)
- Intoxicant Moon for ondes martenot (1991)
- Rhythm Gradation for timpani (1993)
- Omniscape for violin (1993)
- Generation of Space for double bass (1995)
- Still Time IV for flute (1996)
- Perspectives II for percussion (1996)
- In a Living Memory for flute solo (2000)
- Innervoice on the theme of Gagaku for marimba (2001)
- Ballade for marimba (2002)
- Green Rhythms for marimba (2007)

=== Vocal works ===
- Voice Act for mixed chorus and bassoon (1967)
- Voice Field for children's chorus and percussion (1973)
- Syntax for mixed chorus (1977)
- Aru Toki for soprano and piano (1981)
- Kinderkreuzzug for mixed chorus (1983)
- Kodomo no Jujigun for mixed chorus (1983)
- Heso no Uta for children's chorus (1984)
- Nadare no Toki for mixed chorus, marimba and piano (1985)
- Requiem for male chorus (1985)
- Mangetsu no Yoru no Kaiwa for mixed chorus and percussion (1986)
- Music for Art Kites for soprano and flute (1989)
- Genshiryoku Sensuikan "Onagazame" no Seitekina Kokai to Jisatsu no Uta for mixed chorus (1989)
- Song of Morning for female chorus and sho (1991)
- Desire for mixed chorus (1992)
- Hikari no Toride, Kaze no Shiro for mixed chorus (1992)
- White Horse for mixed chorus and tubular bells (1993)
- Scenes of Poems I for mixed chorus and cello (1994)
- My Song for mezzo-soprano and marimba (1994)
- Sora ni Kotori ga Inakunatta Hi for clarinet and mixed chorus (1995)
- Toge for soprano and harpsichord (1995)
- Voice Perspectives for voice and sho (1996/98)
- Oral Poetry of the Native American for mixed chorus and flute (1997)
- Scenes of Poems I for mixed chorus (1998)
- Three Songs for children's chorus (or female chorus) and marimba (1998)
- Furusato no Hoshi for mixed chorus and viola (2001)
- Futatsu no Uta for soprano and piano (2001)
- Michizane in Sanuki for mixed chorus and piano (2001)
- Attendance Flowers Funeral for soprano and piano (2005/07)
- Legend of the Water Flame for mixed chorus and piano (2005/07)
- "White Nights" Suite for mixed chorus and piano (2007)
- Coexistence for male chorus and traditional Japanese instrumental ensemble (2008)
- Three Songs for mixed chorus (2008)
- Mirai e for mixed chorus and piano (2008)

=== Japanese instrumental works ===
- Ôgenraku for gagaku ensemble, versions with and without shokyo (1980/86)
- Enenraku for gagaku ensemble (1982)
- Rinkaiiki for solo sangen (1983)
- Galaxy for solo sho (1983)
- Hikari-nagi for ryuteki and percussion (1983)
- Density for shakuhachi, 2 koto and sangen (1984)
- Clouds Shore, Wind Roots for reigaku and gagaku ensemble (1984)
- Still Time I for solo sho (1986)
- Still Time II for solo kugo (ancient harp) (1986)
- Reigaku Symphony "The Shadows Appearing through Darkness" (1987)
- Katachi naki Mugen no Yoha for solo koto (1987)
- Voices of Water for hitsu (1988)
- Sensing the Color in the Wind for shakuhachi and 2 kotos (1988)
- Prāna for ryuteki, hichiriki, sho, kugo, hensho and dancer (1988)
- Transfiguration of the Flower for koto, sangen and shakuhachi (1988)
- Water Relativity for hitsu and kin (1989)
- Reigaku Symphony No. 2 "Jitsugetsu Byobu Isso - Kokai" (1989)
- The Way for 2 ryuteki, 2 hichiriki, 2 sho, shakuhachi, biwa, 2 koto, 2 percussion and female dancer (1990)
- Linked Poems of Autumn for solo koto (1990)
- The Way II for 4 ryuteki, 4 hichiriki, 5 sho, shakuhachi, biwa, 2 koto, 3 percussion and 10 shomyo (1990)
- Projection for solo koto (1991)
- Compound Tune, "Resonance, Luster and Color" for shakuhachi and 2 koto (1992)
- Unchu Kuyo Bosatsu for gagaku, reigaku and shomyo (1994)
- Land Mystery for shakuhachi and 20-string koto (1997)
- Still Time V for solo hōkyō (similar to Chinese fangxiang) (1998)
- Reigaku Kokyo for reigaku ensemble (1998)
- Ceremonial Space for ryuteki, hichiriki, sho, shakuhachi, 2 koto and percussion (2001)
- Hakko for sho and koto (2001)
- Coexistence 2008 for ancient instruments (2008)
- Ka-Cho-Fu-Getsu for Japanese instruments (2009)

=== Electronic music ===
- Music for Electric Metronomes (1960)
- Parallel Music (1962)
- Life Music (1966)
- Situation for biwa, koto, violin, double bass, piano and multiplier (1966)
- Tinguely Mixture No.1, No. 2 (1966)
- Extended Voices for voices and synthesizer (1967)
- Expansions for rock band and modulators (1969)
- Tokyo 1969 for various modulators, street sounds and rock band (1969)
- Theater Music (1969)
- Mandalama (1969)
- Environmental Music 1, 2 and 3 (1970)
- Music for Living Space (1970)
- The World (1975)
- Perspectives for noh dancer, flute, violin, viola, cello, percussion and electronic music (1978)
- Transfiguration for harp and electronics (2009)

=== Theater pieces ===
- Event and Musique Concrète happening (1961)
- Pratyāhārā Event (1963–73)
- Chair Event happening (1966)

=== Film scores ===
- Farewell to the Summer Light, directed by Yoshishige Yoshida (1968)
- Eros + Massacre, directed by Yoshishige Yoshida (1969)
- Heroic Purgatory, directed by Yoshishige Yoshida (1970)
- Confessions Among Actresses, directed by Yoshishige Yoshida (1971)
- Metastasis, directed by Toshio Matsumoto (1971)
- Martial Law directed by Yoshishige Yoshida (1973)
- Everything Visible Is Empty, directed by Toshio Matsumoto (1975)
- Ātman, directed by Toshio Matsumoto (1975)
- Jun, directed by Hiroto Yokoyama (1980)
- Wangan Doro, directed by Yōichi Higashi (1984)
- Saya: Perspective in Love, directed by Seiji Izumi (1986)
