= Toshiyuki Hosokawa =

Japanese actor (1940–2011)

- 細川 俊之
- Born: December 15, 1940; Fukuoka, Japan
- Died: January 14, 2011 (aged 70); Tokyo, Japan
- Occupation: Actor
- Years active: 1963–2011
- Spouse(s): Mayumi Ogawa (1967–1973); Norie Fujimoto (1974–2011)

Toshiyuki Hosokawa (細川 俊之, Hosokawa Toshiyuki; December 15, 1940 – January 14, 2011) was a Japanese actor and disc jockey, whose credits included roles in television, film, stage and musical theater. He reached prominence in Japan for his starring role in the 1970 film Eros Plus Massacre, which was directed by Yoshishige Yoshida.

Hosokawa was born and raised in Fukuoka Prefecture. He launched his acting career as a member of the theater company, Bungakuza, in 1964. He joined Bungakuza after leaving his university. He soon co-starred with actress, Nana Kinomi, in the musical, Show Girl. Additionally, Hosokawa served as a professor at Osaka University of Arts beginning in 2004.

Hosokawa accidentally fell and suffered head injuries at his home on January 12, 2011. He died of subdural hematoma at a hospital in Tokyo, Japan, on January 14, 2011, at the age of 70.

== Filmography ==
=== Film ===
- Flame and Women (1967) – Man
- Eros + Massacre (1970) – Sakae Ōsugi
- Zatoichi Meets Yojimbo (1970) – Goto
- Confessions Among Actresses (1971) – Apparent Father
- Ashita no Joe (1980) – Tōru Rikiishi (voice)
- The Makioka Sisters (1983)
- Childhood Days (1990) – Shusaku Kazama
- Tobu yume o shibaraku minai (1990) – Shuji Taura
- Welcome Back, Mr. McDonald (1997) – Jo Hamamura

=== Television ===
- Kaze to Kumo to Niji to (1976)
- Sekigahara (1981) – Naoe Kanetsugu
- Ōoku (1983) – Tokugawa Ieharu
- Sanada Taiheiki (1985) – Ōno Harunaga
- Homeless Child (1994) – Eiji Ōtsubo
- Kindaichi Case Files (1995) – Yuichiro Matoba
- Hachidai Shōgun Yoshimune (1995) – Tokugawa Ienobu
- Mōri Motonari (1997) – Ōuchi Yoshioki
- Aoi Tokugawa Sandai (2000) – Ōtani Yoshitsugu
