= Women in the Mirror =

2002 Japanese film

- Film poster
- Directed by: Yoshishige Yoshida
- Written by: Yoshishige Yoshida
- Produced by: Manasori Ayabe; Akira Narisawa; Matsuo Takahashi
- Starring: Mariko Okada; Yoshiko Tanaka; Sae Isshiki; Hideo Murota; Hiroshi Inuzuka
- Cinematography: Masao Nakabori
- Edited by: Yoshishige Yoshida; Hiroaki Morishita
- Music by: Keiko Harada; Mayumi Miyata
- Production companies: Sépia Productions; Root Pictures; Groove Kinema; Gendai Eigasha
- Release date: 5 April 2002 (Japan)
- Running time: 129 minutes
- Country: Japan
- Language: Japanese

Women in the Mirror (Japanese: 鏡の女たち, Hepburn: Kagami no onnatachi) is a 2002 Japanese drama film written and directed by Yoshishige Yoshida. It was Yoshida's last feature film.

== Cast ==
- Mariko Okada – Ai Kawase
- Yoshiko Tanaka – Masako
- Sae Isshiki – Natsuki
- Hideo Murota – Goda
- Hiroshi Inuzuka
- Tokuma Nishioka – The protector
- Mirai Yamamoto – The journalist
- Miki Sanjo – The old woman
- Hiroshi Inuzuka – The old man

== Release ==
Women in the Mirror was screened out of competition at the 2002 Cannes Film Festival.
