= Affair in the Snow =

1968 Japanese film

- Original Japanese poster
- Directed by: Yoshishige Yoshida
- Written by: Toshiro Ishido; Yoshishige Yoshida
- Produced by: Saburo Muto; Akira Oda
- Starring: Mariko Okada; Isao Kimura; Yukio Ninagawa
- Cinematography: Yūji Okumura
- Edited by: Kazuo Ōta
- Music by: Sei Ikeno
- Production company: Gendai Eigasha
- Distributed by: Shochiku
- Release date: 31 January 1968 (Japan)
- Running time: 97 minutes
- Country: Japan
- Language: Japanese

Affair in the Snow (Japanese: 樹氷のよろめき, Hepburn: Juhyō no yoromeki; lit. Love Affair Amidst the Soft Rime) is a 1968 Japanese drama film directed by Yoshishige Yoshida.

== Plot ==
Yuriko and her lover, high school teacher Sugino, take a vacation together, which she intended to use to put an end to their affair. Sugino insists that she stays with him, but Yuriko leaves alone for Muroran, where she wants to abort her and Sugino's unborn child. In Muroran, she contacts Kazuo, a former friend to whom she was once close. At the clinic, Yuriko learns that she had a false pregnancy. Re-united with Sugino, Yuriko tells him that she once spent the night with Kazuo, but that he was unable to make love to her. The next day, Yuriko wants to travel back to Sapporo first, but heads for Niseko instead. All three meet again at an inn in Niseko, where Kazuo slaps Sugino during a confrontation. Sugino disappears into the heavy snow, followed by Yuriko and Kazuo, who fear that he might get lost. Yuriko and Kazuo spend the night in a mountain hotel, where he finally manages to make love to her. When Yuriko and Kazuo eventually find Sugino, who is partying with three young women, he tries to rape Yuriko, but is unable to do so, blaming Kazuo's presence as the reason. On their way back from the mountains, Yuriko tells the persistent Sugino that their affair is irreversibly over. Sugino jumps off a cliff, later dying of his wounds, and the film closes with Yuriko crying.

== Cast ==
- Mariko Okada as Yuriko
- Isao Kimura as Kazuo
- Yukio Ninagawa as Sugino
- Miyoko Akaza as Yoko
