= Reiko Ohara =

Japanese actress (1946–2009)

- 大原 麗子
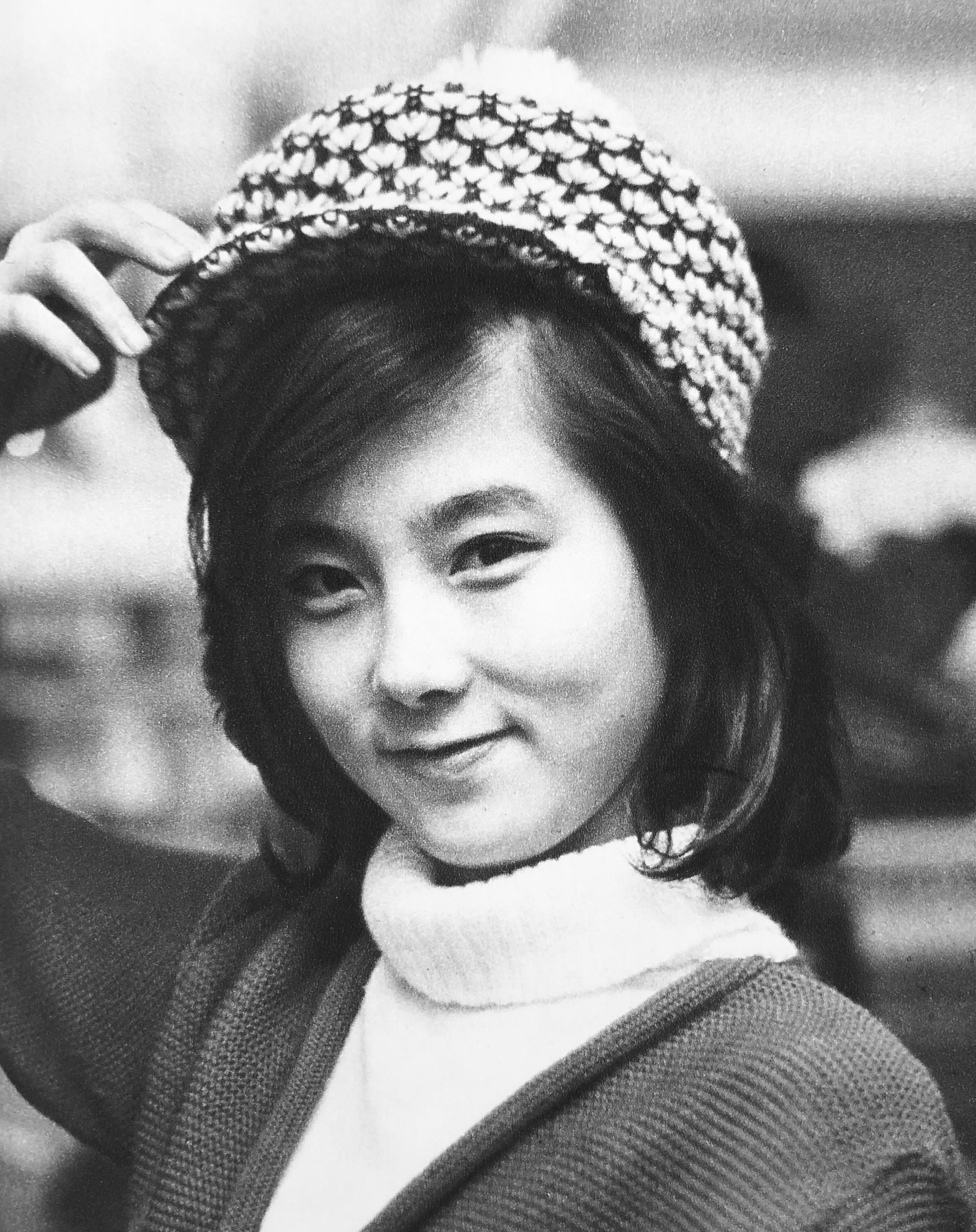
- Ohara for the April 1965 issue of Movie Pictorial
- Born: November 12, 1946; Bunkyō, Tokyo, Japan
- Died: August 3, 2009 (aged 62); Setagaya, Tokyo, Japan
- Occupation: Actress
- Years active: 1964–2009
- Spouses: Tsunehiko Watase (m. 1973; div. 1978); Shinichi Mori (m. 1980; div. 1984)

Reiko Ohara (Japanese: 大原 麗子, Hepburn: Ōhara Reiko; November 13, 1946 – August 3, 2009) was a Japanese actress. She is best known for her roles in the taiga dramas Kasuga the Court Lady (1989) and Tokugawa Yoshinobu (1998), television drama Rikon Tomodachi (1980), and film Ohan (1984). Her life was adapted into the television drama Actress Reiko: Like a Flame in 2013.

== Biography ==
=== Early life ===
Ohara was born on November 13, 1946, in Bunkyō, Tokyo to a family that sold Japanese confectionery in the Hongō area. When she was eight, her parents divorced due to her father's affair; she and her mother moved to Akabane while her younger brother stayed with their father.

=== Career ===
She was scouted by Nao Ōno, the president of Tokyo Broadcasting and the eldest son of Banboku Ōno. She had a bit part in Let's Meet in a Dream in 1962, though she made her debut two years later in Happiness Exam and joined Toei the year after that. Alongside Yuki Jōno, who had joined Toei around the same time, she was promoted as Toei's most popular new actress, and became popular in 1966 with the Golden Week film Abashiri Prison: Showdown in the WIlderness, starring Ken Takakura. Around this period Toei began producing "delinquent sensitivity films", making most of Ohara's roles bar hostesses or prostitutes. In 1971, when her contract with Toei expired, she transferred to Watanabe Productions. However, in February 1972, when announcing Ohara's engagement with Tsunehiko Watase, Sports Nippon referred to her as a Toei actress, and Shigeru Okada, then president of Toei, told the press that the couple were "our company's leading stars" and that he looks forward to working with them in the future. Ohara had first co-starred with Watase in Three Bees in 1970. She married Watase in 1973 and they divorced five years later. In 1975, Ohara was diagnosed with Guillain–Barré syndrome.

Since then, Ohara changed her focus to television dramas, playing the role of a "moist Japanese beauty", alongside roles such as a femme fatale in Ohan. Ohara appeared in a Suntory advertisement for their Red whisky, where she wore a kimono and said in a hoarse voice "Love me a little, love me a lot", which was well-loved and aired from 1980 to 1990. Ohara married enka singer Shinichi Mori in 1980. In 2019, Ohara's brother said that Mori had wanted children, and Ohara became pregnant two years into their marriage, but had an abortion to prioritize her work. During her press conference for their divorce in 1984, she said it was because she did not want to quit her job, and that "there were two men at home". Following the divorce, she changed name to Reiko Iizuka (飯塚 麗子, Iizuka Reiko), taking her mother's surname. Ohara had a ¥300,000,000 (equivalent to ¥385,617,978 in 2024) mansion built in Okamoto, Setagaya, in 1986, and began living there with her mother. In 1989, Ohara starred in the taiga drama Kasuga the Court Lady as Lady Kasuga, which garnered a rating of 32.4%, the third highest ever for a taiga drama.

=== Later life ===
Ohara underwent surgery for breast cancer in 1994. She had double eyelid surgery in 1999, but it failed, and her eyelids became swollen, causing her to drop Amagi Goe 2; she later underwent revision surgery. In November 1999, Ohara suspended her activities due to the reoccurrence of her Guillain–Barré syndrome. During this time, her doctor passed away. She had a possible reoccurrence of the syndrome in November 2008, when she fell at home, fracturing her right wrist and bruising her knee. The fall was possibly because of a loss of balance due to the syndrome; specialists have said that recurrences of the disease are rare.

=== Death and legacy ===
On August 6, 2009, Ohara was found dead in her home after worried relatives had contacted the police. The autopsy estimated her death to have been three days prior, with the cause as an intracerebral hemorrhage. On August 23, a farewell party was held by Mitsuko Mori, Fukuko Ishii, Ruriko Asaoka and others at Aoyama Funeral Home. It was attended by Oharu's ex-husbands as well as other celebrities. The eulogy was given by Asaoka.

In July 2011, a biography of Ohara written by Tadaaki Maeda and edited by Masamitsu Ohara, her younger brother, titled Reiko Ohara: Like a Flame was published. It was adapted into the television drama Actress Reiko: Like a Flame (女優麗子～炎のように, Joyū Reiko: Honō no yō ni) in 2013, with Rina Uchiyama starring as Ohara.

== Filmography ==
=== Film ===
- Iro (1965)
- Kamo (1965) – Yuki Murai
- Abashiri bangaichi: Hokkai hen (1965)
- Yoru no mesuinu (1966)
- Hikô shôjo Yôko (1966) – Ako
- Otoko nante nanisa (1966) – Miki
- Abashiri bangaichi: Kettô reika 30 do (1967) – Michiko
- Kigeki: Kyûkô ressha (1967)
- Kawachi yûkyôden (1967) – Miyo Sugimoto
- Maruhi toruko buro (1968)
- Ôoku emaki (1968) – Omachi
- Ah, yokaren (1968)
- Iro (1969) – Hatsue Uehara
- Zatoichi Goes to the Fire Festival (1970) – Okiyo
- Keiken (1970)
- Kigeki Kaiun ryokô (1971)
- Furyo bancho te haccho kuchi haccho (1971)
- Erotica iro-gassen (1972) – Geisha
- Gokumon-to (1977) – Sanae, Chimata's Cousin
- Shogun's Samurai (1978) – Izumo no Okuni
- Hi no tori (1978) – Hinaku
- Talk of the Town Tora-san (1978) – Sanae
- Sekando rabu (1983) – Kazumi Hyuga
- Izakaya Chōji (1983) – Sayo Kamiya
- Ohan (1984) – Okayo
- Tora-san's Forbidden Love (1984) – Fujiko Tominaga
- Big Joys, Small Sorrows (1986) – Asako
- Shôrishatachi (1992) – Keiko Kunitomo

=== Television ===
- Taiyō ni Hoero! (1973, NTV, Guest) – Kyoko Harada
- NHK Taiga drama
  - Katsu Kaishū (1974)
  - Sanga Moyu (1984)
  - Kasuga no Tsubone (1989) – Ofuku
  - Tokugawa Yoshinobu (1998) – Ren
