= Heroic Purgatory =

- Film poster
- Directed by: Yoshishige Yoshida
- Written by: Yoshishige Yoshida; Masahiro Yamada
- Produced by: Yoshishige Yoshida; Sei Okamura
- Starring: Mariko Okada
- Cinematography: Motokichi Hasegawa
- Edited by: Hiroyuki Yasuoka
- Music by: Toshi Ichiyanagi
- Production companies: Gendai Eigasha; Art Theatre Guild
- Release date: 26 September 1970 (Japan)
- Running time: 118 minutes
- Country: Japan
- Language: Japanese

Heroic Purgatory (Japanese: 煉獄エロイカ, Hepburn: Rengoku eroica) is a 1970 Japanese drama film directed by Yoshishige Yoshida. It is the second film in a loose trilogy, preceded by Eros + Massacre (1969) and followed by Coup d'Etat (1973).
