= Isao Kimura =

Japanese actor (1923–1981)

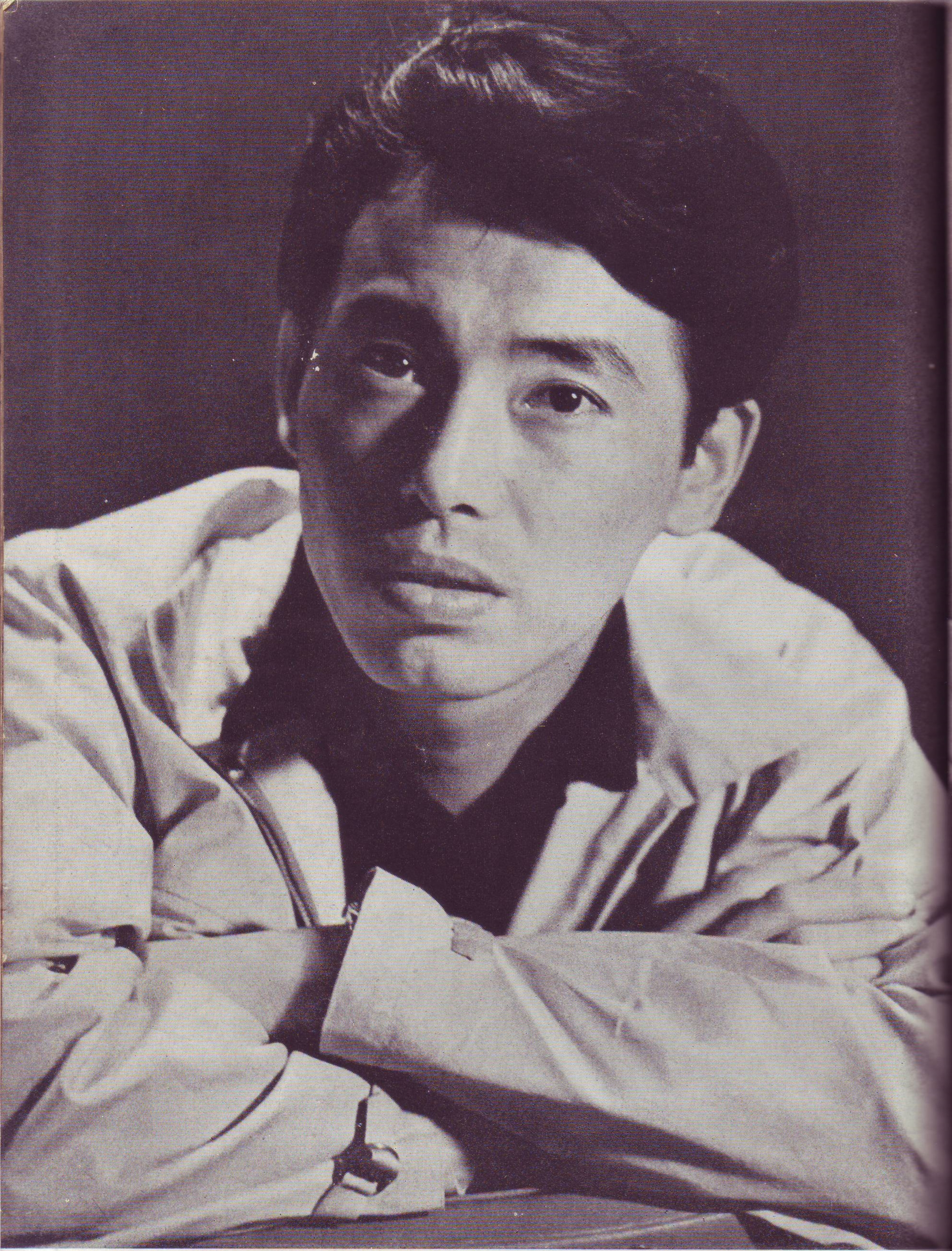
- Kimura in 1954
- Born: 22 June 1923; Sendamachi, Hiroshima, Japan
- Died: 4 July 1981 (aged 58); Tokyo, Japan
- Other name: Kō Kimura
- Occupation: Actor

Isao Kimura (木村 功, Kimura Isao; 22 June 1923 – 4 July 1981), sometimes credited as Kō Kimura, was a Japanese stage and film actor who appeared in more than one hundred films of directors such as Akira Kurosawa, Mikio Naruse, Tadashi Imai and Yoshishige Yoshida.

== Biography ==
Kimura was born in Hiroshima, and graduated from the Bunka Gakuin school, Tokyo, in 1943. In 1945, he lost his parents in the atomic bombing of Hiroshima and was himself exposed to radiation. He joined the Haiyuza Theatre Company in 1946, but left four years later to form the Youth Actor Club (Gekidan Seihai) with Eiji Okada and Nobuo Kaneko.

Kimura acted in films since 1942. Notable appearances include Kurosawa's Stray Dog, Seven Samurai and Ikiru. In addition, he worked with the Seihai theatre company and made numerous television appearances. He succumbed to cancer and died in 1981, aged 58.

== Selected filmography ==
- Hawai Mare oki kaisen (1942) – Kurata
- The Love of Sumako the Actress (1947)
- Stray Dog (1949) – Yusa the criminal
- Angry Street (1950)
- Elegy (1951)
- Nakinureta ningyō (1951)
- Dokkoi ikiteru (1951)
- Dancing Girl (1951) – Nozu
- Yamabiko gakkō (1952)
- Boryoku (1952)
- Ikiru (1952) – Intern
- Vacuum Zone (1952) – Kitani
- Onna hitori daichi o yuku (1953)
- Pu-san (1953)
- Seven Samurai (1954) – Katsushiro Okamoto
- Okuman choja (1954) – Koroku Tate
- Ashizuri misaki (1954)
- Hi no hate (1954)
- Ningen gyorai kaiten (1955)
- Ofukuro (1955)
- Beautiful Days (1955)
- Asunaro monogatari (1955) – Kashima
- Kyatsu o nigasuna (1956) – Takeo Fujisaki
- Tengoku wa doko da (1956)
- Boshizō (1956) – Shimizu
- Throne of Blood (1957) – Phantom samurai
- The Rice People (1957) – Senkichi
- Bibō no miyako (1957)
- Jun'ai monogatari (1957) – Doctor at Segawa Hospital
- Anzukko (1958) – Ryokichi Urushiyama – the husband
- Kisetsufu no kanatani (1958)
- Summer Clouds (1958) – Okawa
- Kēdamonō no torū michi (1959)
- Onna to kaizoku (1959) – Koshichi
- Hahakogusa (1959) – Yoshihiko Takayama
- Keishichō monogatari: Iryūhin nashi (1959)
- Shiroi gake (1960)
- Yōtō monogatari: hana no Yoshiwara hyakunin-giri (1960)
- Ikinuita jūroku-nen: Saigo no Nippon-hei (1960) – Takano, Army officer
- Kēnju yaro ni gо̄yojin (1961)
- Miyamoto Musashi (1961) – Hon'iden Matahachi
- Machi (1961) – News paper editor
- Hachi-nin me no teki (1961) – Kutsuda
- Knightly Advice (1962)
- Nippon no obaachan (1962) – Taguchi
- The Temple of the Wild Geese (1962) – Atsumichi Uda
- Watakushi-tachi no kekkon (1962)
- Miyamoto Musashi: Showdown at Hannyazaka Heights (1962) – Hon'iden Matahachi
- Seki no yatappe (1963)
- High and Low (1963) – Detective Arai
- Bushido, Samurai Saga (1963) – Hirotaro Iguchi
- Miyamoto Musashi: Nitо̄ryū kaigen (1963) – Hon'iden Matahachi
- Miyamoto Musashi: The Duel at Ichijoji (1964) – Hon'iden Matahachi
- Assassination (1964) – Tadasaburо̄ Sasaki
- Ware hitotsubu no mugi naredo (1964)
- Shape of the Night (1964) – Saitо̄
- Bakumatsu zankoku monogatari (1964)
- Miyamoto Musashi: Ganryū-jima no kettо̄ (1965) – Hon'iden Matahachi
- Akutō (1965) – Shioya Hangan
- Tange Sazen: Hien iaigiri (1966) – Yagyu Genzaburo
- Aogeba tōtoshi (1966)
- The Affair (1967) – Mitsuhuru
- Tabiji (1967) – Eikichi
- Flame and Women (1967) – Shingo Ibuki
- Black Lizard (1968) – Detective Kogoro Akechi
- Affair In The Snow (1968) – Kazuo Imai
- Snow Country (1969) – Shimamura
- Secret Information (1969) – Goro Izawa
- Chōkōsō no Akebono (1969)
- Sakariba nagashi uta: Shinjuku no onna (1970) – Funaki
- Tenkan no abarembo (1970) – Hanpeita Takechi
- Confessions Among Actresses (1971) – Director Nose
- Lone Wolf and Cub: White Heaven in Hell (1974) – Tsuchigumo Hyoei
- Pastoral: To Die in the Country (1974) – Film Critic
- Nagisa no shiroi ie (1978) – Toshihiko Kurahashi
