= Dancing Girl (1951 film) =

1951 Japanese film

- Film poster
- 舞姫
- Directed by: Mikio Naruse
- Written by: Kaneto Shindō (screenplay); Yasunari Kawabata (novel)
- Produced by: Hideo Koi
- Starring: Sō Yamamura; Mieko Takamine; Mariko Okada
- Cinematography: Asakazu Nakai
- Music by: Ichirō Saitō
- Production company: Toho
- Distributed by: Toho
- Release date: 17 August 1951 (Japan)
- Running time: 85 minutes
- Country: Japan
- Language: Japanese

Dancing Girl (Japanese: 舞姫, Hepburn: Maihime; lit. Dancing Princess) is a 1951 Japanese drama film directed by Mikio Naruse. The screenplay by Kaneto Shindō is based on the novel Maihime by Yasunari Kawabata. It was Mariko Okada's debut film.

== Plot ==
University professor Yagi and his wife Namiko, a former ballet dancer who now runs a ballet school, live in an unhappy marriage in their house in Kamakura together with their children Shinako and Takao. Namiko projects her unfulfilled dreams of a career as a dancer onto her daughter Shinako, who is a member of a ballet ensemble. Takehara, a long-time friend of Namiko who has been in love with her all these years, tries to talk her into leaving Yagi. When Namiko learns from Takao that Yagi has secretly been putting money on the side during their years of financial hardship, she considers giving up her marriage for Takehara.

Together with her friend and ensemble colleague Nozu, Shinako visits her former ballet teacher Kayama at his sickbed. Before he dies, Kayama urges Shinako to "dance as long as you've got legs". Determined not to give up her dream of becoming a ballerina like her mother did, Shinako later rejects Nozu's proposal. Namiko, after seeing her daughter perform in a staging of Swan Lake, decides against Takehara's offer to accompany him to a trip to Kansai and returns to Yagi.

== Cast ==
- Sō Yamamura as Yagi
- Mieko Takamine as Namiko
- Mariko Okada as daughter Shinako
- Akihiko Katayama as son Takao
- Hiroshi Nihon'yanagi as Takehara
- Bontarō Miake as Numata
- Isao Kimura as Nozu
- Reiko Otani as Tomoko
- Heihachirō Ōkawa as Kayama
- Sadako Sawamura as Mitsue
- Momoko Tani with her ballet company

== Reception ==
In her book on Mikio Naruse, film historian Catherine Russell rated Dancing Girl, although a lesser film than the director's Ginza Cosmetics and Repast (both too made in 1951), an "important transitional film" which deployed some of the "flamboyant melodramatic devices" of his 1930s films in a post-war narrative.
