= The Island Closest to Heaven =

- Theatrical poster

Japanese name
- Kana: 天国にいちばん近い島
Transcriptions
- Revised Hepburn: Tengoku ni ichiban chikai shima
- Directed by: Nobuhiko Obayashi
- Screenplay by: Wataru Kenmotsu
- Story by: Katsura Morimura
- Produced by: Haruki Kadokawa
- Starring: Tomoyo Harada; Ryōichi Takayanagi; Tōru Minegishi; Miyoko Akaza; Shigeru Izumiya
- Cinematography: Yoshitaka Sakamoto
- Edited by: Nobuhiko Obayashi
- Music by: Tomoyuki Asakawa
- Release date: 15 December 1984 (Japan)
- Running time: 102 minutes
- Country: Japan
- Language: Japanese

The Island Closest to Heaven (Japanese: 天国にいちばん近い島, Hepburn: Tengoku ni ichiban chikai shima) is a 1984 Japanese film directed by Nobuhiko Obayashi, based on an original story by Katsura Morimura.

== Plot ==
After her father's sudden death, a Japanese high school girl travels to the southwest Pacific archipelago of New Caledonia in search of the location, which they had agreed to visit together, of the film's title. From her encounters with Japanese émigrés and locals, she learns where the real island closest to heaven may be found.

== Cast ==
- Tomoyo Harada as Mari
- Ryōichi Takayanagi as Taro
- Tōru Minegishi
- Miyoko Akaza
- Shigeru Izumiya
- Yukihiro Takahashi
- Kayo Matsuo
- Nenji Kobayashi
- Hideo Murota
- Nobuko Otowa
