= Music for Electric Metronomes =

1960 aleatoric composition by Toshi Ichiyanagi

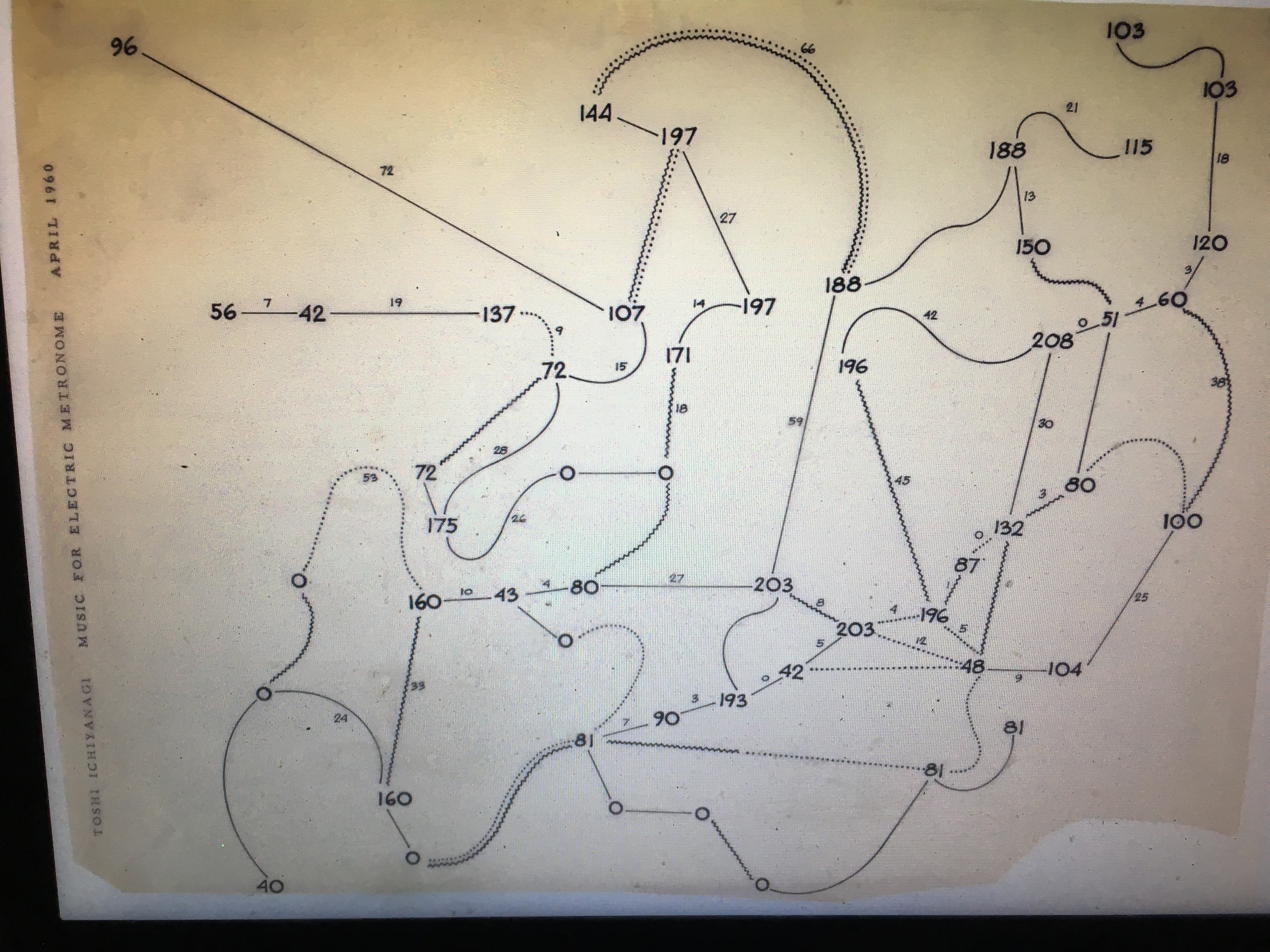
Score for Music for Electric Metronomes

Music for Electric Metronomes is an avant-garde aleatoric composition written in 1960 by Japanese composer Toshi Ichiyanagi for any number of performers between three and eight. The piece involves the manipulation of electric metronomes, followed by various unspecified sounds and actions. It is a very theatrical piece, and reflects Ichiyanagi's affiliation with Fluxus, an experimental art movement from the sixties. The only true scored "instrument" is an electric metronome for each individual player, though the varying sounds and/or actions may involve many different instruments and objects at the discretion of the performer. Because the graphic notation of the score—a series of dashes, lines, and numbers in an erratic pattern of connected paths—leaves room for personal interpretation and expression, each performance is unique, and almost certainly cannot be reproduced. There is no conductor for the performance. It has been recorded on the album Toshi Ichiyanagi: 1960's & 1990's. In a review of a performance by the S.E.M. Ensemble in 1992 at the Paula Cooper Gallery, the music critic of The New York Times, Alex Ross, described the piece as "merely a timid, spastic prelude to György Ligeti's monumental Poème symphonique for 100 metronomes".

== Score ==
The score for Music for Electric Metronomes consists of a diagram featuring series of dashes, lines, and numbers in an erratic pattern of connected paths accompanied by a set of directions. Each player looks at the score and chooses a path, starting from one "end" of the score, and finishing at another. There are 10 "ends" to start and finish with. This path should culminate in about 8 minutes' worth of actions, sounds, and metronome manipulation. Once the player has chosen their path, they will use numbers as guides for meter and duration, and various types of lines as a guide to choosing their actions and sounds. Each player will begin at their respective ends, and start the metronome at the BPM (beats per minute) designated by their starting number. Then, using the amount of beats specified, they will gradually adjust the tempo of the metronome to the next designated BPM on their path. The connecting line between these BPMs is what specifies the action(s) or sound(s) that follow:

- A straight, unbroken line means that no action will follow the metronome change. A single curved unbroken line stands for a single action, such as walking. An unbroken line with two or more curves means to make two more actions.
- A straight, dotted line means to make a single physical sound, such as clapping or voice sounds. A single curved dotted line means to make any number of physical sounds of one kind. A dotted line with two or more curves means to make two or more physical sounds of different kinds.
- A straight, zig-zag line means to make a single sound using an external object like an instrument or machine. A single curved zig-zag line means to make any number of sounds using a single external object. A zig-zag line with two or more curves means to make two or more sounds using external objects from two or more sources.
