= Bitter End of a Sweet Night =

1961 Japanese film

- DVD cover
- 甘い夜の果て
- Directed by: Yoshishige Yoshida
- Written by: Yoshishige Yoshida; Yoichi Maeda
- Produced by: Takeshi Sasaki
- Starring: Masahiko Tsugawa; Teruyo Yamagami; Michiko Saga; Hiroko Sugita
- Cinematography: Tōichirō Narushima
- Edited by: Yoshi Sugihara
- Music by: Hikaru Hayashi
- Production company: Shochiku
- Distributed by: Shochiku
- Release date: 14 February 1961 (Japan)
- Running time: 85 minutes
- Country: Japan
- Language: Japanese

Bitter End of a Sweet Night (Japanese: 甘い夜の果て, romanized: Amai yoru no hate) is a 1961 Japanese drama film directed by Yoshishige Yoshida and starring Masahiko Tsugawa and Teruyo Yamagami.

== Plot ==
Young shop clerk Jirō is eager to climb the social ladder, an aim for which he uses and manipulates everyone around him. He talks diner waitress Harumi into moving into his flat and introduces her to bar madam Soko, who pays him for his mediation. While Harumi is reluctant to Jirō's advances, she eventually agrees to Soko's plan to have refinery owner Hondo act as her patron and pay for an apartment for her. Jirō has affairs both with Soko and Masae, the widowed daughter-in-law of foundry owner Oka, whom he intends to marry for her money. When Hondo buys Oka out of his heavily indebted company, Masae is left without any assets, and Jirō dumps her. After Harumi dies in a car accident with another lover, Jirō returns to Soko, who bluntly tells him that she will keep him simply as her gigolo and pet, to which he starts laughing hysterically.

== Cast ==
- Masahiko Tsugawa as Jirō Tezuka
- Teruyo Yamagami as Harumi Nishimoto
- Sumiko Hidaka as Hisako Nishimoto, Harumi's mother
- Michiko Saga as Soko Mishima
- Jun Hamamura as Kenkichi Mishima, Soko's father
- Osamu Takizawa as Hondo
- Hiroko Sugita as Masae Oka
- Takamaru Sasaki as Tokusaburo Oka, Masae's father-in-law

== Home media ==
Bitter End of a Sweet Night was released on DVD in France in 2008 and in Japan in 2013 as part of DVD boxes with collected works by Yoshida.

== Bibliography ==
- Berra, John (2012). Directory of World Cinema: Japan 2. Bristol: Intellect Books. p. 256. ISBN 978-1-84150551-0.
