= Confessions Among Actresses =

- Film poster
- Directed by: Yoshishige Yoshida
- Screenplay by: Yoshishige Yoshida; Masahiro Yamada
- Produced by: Junya Katsumata; Keiji Isoda; Sei Okamura; Yoshishige Yoshida
- Starring: Mariko Okada; Ruriko Asaoka; Ineko Arima; Rentarō Mikuni; Isao Kimura
- Cinematography: Motokichi Hasegawa
- Edited by: Shirō Watanabe
- Music by: Toshi Ichiyanagi
- Production company: Gendai Eigasha
- Distributed by: Art Theatre Guild
- Release date: 18 December 1971 (Japan)
- Running time: 124 minutes
- Country: Japan
- Language: Japanese

Confessions Among Actresses (Japanese: 告白的女優論, Hepburn: Kokuhakuteki joyūron) is a 1971 Japanese New Wave metafictional drama film co-written and directed by Yoshishige Yoshida. Its plot, which explores the relationship between trauma and performance, follows three actresses preparing for a film production, with each actresses' story structured as a series of confessional interviews and dramatized scenes. The film stars Mariko Okada, Ruriko Asaoka, Ineko Arima, Rentarō Mikuni and Isao Kimura. Its score was composed by Toshi Ichiyanagi. Confessions Among Actresses was theatrically released by Art Theatre Guild on 18 December 1971, in Japan.

== Plot ==
The film follows the lives of three actresses (Aki Kaido, Shoko Ichimori, and Makiko Isaku) two days before filming is set to begin for the movie "Confessional Actress Theory". Their stories unfold simultaneously, with each one structured as a combination of confessional interviews and dramatized scenes. Each woman owes their choice of profession to a respective traumatic event.

"Confessional Actress Theory" is scheduled to begin production on Monday. However, as of Saturday, Aki Kaido is still on location in Izu filming the final scenes of her previous project. There are rumors of an affair between Kaido and the director of the film, Nose, but the rumors are unfounded. When Aki returns to her hotel after completion of filming, Nose's wife, Kiriko, is waiting for her. Kiriko refuses to say anything, but her expression is accusatory. That night, Aki returns home with her assistant and longtime friend, Kyoko. In the middle of the night, she witnesses a man sneaking into Kyoko's room. The man is Nose. The next morning, she and Nose meet face to face as he is quietly trying to leave. She learns that Kyoko had invited Nose in, intending to sleep with him, as she desired to take revenge on Aki (she, too, believed that Aki was sleeping with the director). Aki, trembling with rage, demands to know Kyoko's motivation for vengeance. Kyoko tells her a story that stretches back to their shared past. When they were young, Aki and Kyoko were high school classmates. One day during summer vacation, they went to visit a teacher's boarding house. While there, Kyoko was drugged with chloroform and raped. Aki tipped off the school about the teacher and Kyoko, resulting in penalties for both. Since then, Kyoko has been plotting revenge against Aki. After Kyoko finishes her story, Aki laughs. She tells Kyoko, "What could you know, having been drugged?" Aki reveals that she was the one who was actually raped by the teacher that day. Kyoko and Nose leave Aki's house.

On Friday, Shoko Ichimori suddenly announces that she will not be appearing in "Confessions of an Actress," causing her manager, Minakawa, to panic. She explains the reason as, "In my dreams, a plastic ball gets stuck in my throat, and I feel like I'm going to lose my voice." Distressed, she visits Dr. Toyama's clinic for sleep therapy. Simultaneously, Shoko is upset that her estranged husband, Hayato Watari, has begun a relationship with Rie, an aspiring actress who is also his assistant. One day later, Minakawa invites Shoko to a pool they used to visit when she was at the start of her career. However, Shoko happens to see a plastic ball floating in the pool. Realizing it is the same ball that had appeared in her dream, she informs Dr. Toyama, who designates roleplay therapy for Shoko and sends his young assistant Hata to visit her that night. Shoko assigns Hata the role of her husband, and, together with Rie and Minakawa, they reenact Shoko's dreams. As the night progresses, a strange dream play unfolds. Hayato, Rie, and the many men who have embraced Shoko over the years appear one after another, but Minakawa does not appear until the very end. During this process, Minakawa, who prides himself on having essentially raised Shoko, feels that something has broken inside himself. On Sunday afternoon, Shoko visits Hata's apartment. When Minakawa sees Shoko, she seems like a distant figure to him. As Shoko starts her car and leaves, Minakawa tries to follow her but is hit by a truck.

Makiko Isaku visits her hometown of S. City for the weekend. She feels that her relationship with her boyfriend Karasawa is nearing its end. Before she became an actress, Makiko had been involved in a double suicide attempt. The other party was her mother's new husband at the time, a young man. Makiko survived the attempt, while the young man died. Makiko has returned to visit the site of her attempt. Standing on a snow-covered plateau, Makiko confesses everything to her friend Nobu, who has accompanied her from Tokyo. After Nobu understands the real her, Makiko decides to give up Karasawa to Nobu. She returns to Tokyo that evening. Upon arrival, Makiko's mother treats her harshly, aware of her travels in spite of Makiko leaving in secrecy. Soon Makiko receives a call from S. City, from a man who does not reveal his identity. Later that night, another call comes from S. City. Makiko picks up the receiver, but the mysterious man hangs up without saying anything. Makiko thinks the man's voice sounds like her father, who is supposed to be dead. The next morning, Nobu comes to visit, after meeting with Karasawa the night before. He has fully informed her of Makiko's past, including her several suicide attempts. She recounts some of these attempts — a double suicide attempt with a young movie star; an attempt after losing a romantic rivalry with Shoko Ichimori for Hayato Watari — and, finally, Nobu conveys Karasawa's words to Makiko: "I will marry her knowing she's suicidal. Even that is part of Makiko's charm." Nobu acknowledges her defeat and departs. She leaves behind a pair of scissors. Makiko is about to cut her wrists with the scissors when Karasawa shows up. Karasawa tells her, "If you are an actress, you cannot die. Even dying is part of the act for you." The scissors slip from Makiko's hand.

On Monday morning, the three actresses appear on the set of "Confessional Actress Theory", beautifully made up. When interviewed and asked, "What does being an actress mean to you?", they answer diplomatically, hiding everything behind their adorned masks. As filming commences, the three actresses walk towards the cameras with elegance.

== Cast ==
- Mariko Okada as Shoko Ichimori
- Ruriko Asaoka as Aki Kaido
- Ineko Arima as Makiko Isaku
- Rentarō Mikuni as Minakawa
- Isao Kimura as Director Nose
- Miyoko Akaza as Kyoko
- Kiwako Taichi as Rie
- Kazuko Inano as Kiriko Nose
- Yumeji Tsukioka as Makiko's Mother
- Toshiyuki Hosokawa as Apparent Father
- Tōru Minegishi as An Actor
- Yūsuke Kawazu as High School Teacher
- Daigo Kusano as Owner of the Cleaning Shop
- Yoshio Harada as Stalker
- Kantarō Suga as Dr. Hata
- Toshirō Hayano as Dr. Toyama
- Seiya Nakano as Hayato Watari
- Kikuo Kaneuchi as Interviewer
- Taiji Kodama as Milkman
- Toshihiko Miki as Young Actor
- Gō Itō as Karasawa

== Release ==
Confessions Among Actresses was theatrically released by Art Theatre Guild on 18 December 1971, in Japan.

The film was later released to DVD on 21 October 2005.

== Critical analysis ==
Film at Lincoln Center screened the film in 35mm from 1–8 December 2023 as part of its series "The Radical Cinema of Kijū Yoshida". The Center wrote that Confessions Among Actresses was "Something like Yoshida's response to Bergman's Persona". They noted that the three lead actresses (Okada, Asaoka and Arima) were "renowned for playing eminently modern women who have been wronged by the men around them", and that together the filmmakers crafted "a fragmentary, perpetually shapeshifting work on the relationship between performance and trauma." The Center also praised the mixture of documentary techniques and "more conventionally staged moments", as well as Yoshida's jagged editing style which, in tandem, "conjures a dizzying swirl of disparate realities."

In a 2022 obituary for Yoshida in Le Monde, Jean-François Rauger wrote that Confessions Among Actresses was "a purely theoretical work, bordering on an esoteric essay, which explores, in a fragmented way, acting and the different theories of cinema."

== See also ==
- Persona, a 1966 Ingmar Bergman film.
