= Mariko Okada =

Japanese actress (born 1933)

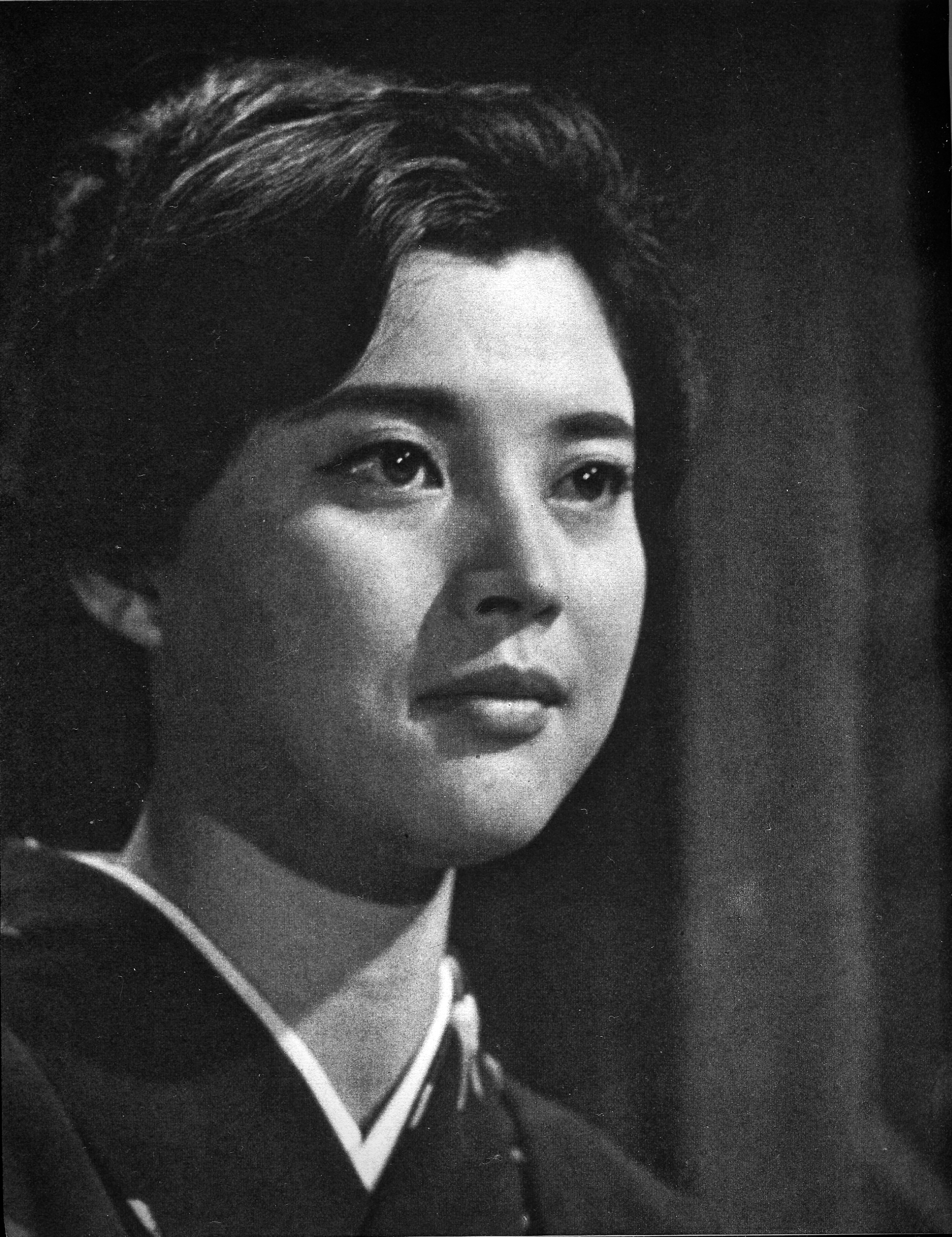
- Okada in 1962
- Born: January 11, 1933 (age 93); Yoyogi, Shibuya-ku, Tokyo, Japan
- Occupations: Actress, film producer
- Years active: 1951–present
- Spouse: Yoshishige Yoshida (m. 1964; died 2022)
- Parent(s): Tokihiko Okada (father); Sonoko Tazuru (mother)

Mariko Okada (岡田 茉莉子, Okada Mariko; born 11 January 1933) is a Japanese stage and film actress who starred in films of directors Mikio Naruse, Yasujirō Ozu, Keisuke Kinoshita and others. She was married to film director Yoshishige Yoshida.

== Biography ==
Okada was born the daughter of silent film actor Tokihiko Okada (real name Eiichi Takahashi), who died the year following her birth, and raised by her mother's sister in her early childhood. She gave her film debut in Mikio Naruse's 1951 Dancing Girl, for whom she worked again in Husband and Wife, Floating Clouds and Nagareru. Unsatisfied with the roles she was assigned to, she left Toho studios after her contract expired, and signed with Shochiku. In the following years, she starred in Yasujirō Ozu's Late Autumn and An Autumn Afternoon, Keisuke Kinoshita's Spring Dreams and The Scent of Incense, and Heinosuke Gosho's Hunting Rifle.

The 1962 Akitsu Springs was Okada's 100th film and the first under the direction of her future husband Yoshishige Yoshida. Between 1965 and 1971, she starred in all of Yoshida's films, independently produced melodramas narrated in an avant-garde fashion, of which Eros + Massacre was the formally most radical.

In later years, she appeared in films like Juzo Itami's Tampopo and Shinji Aoyama's My God, My God, Why Hast Thou Forsaken Me? (2005), her last film role to date. She also regularly performed on stage and on television.

== Partial filmography ==
=== Film ===
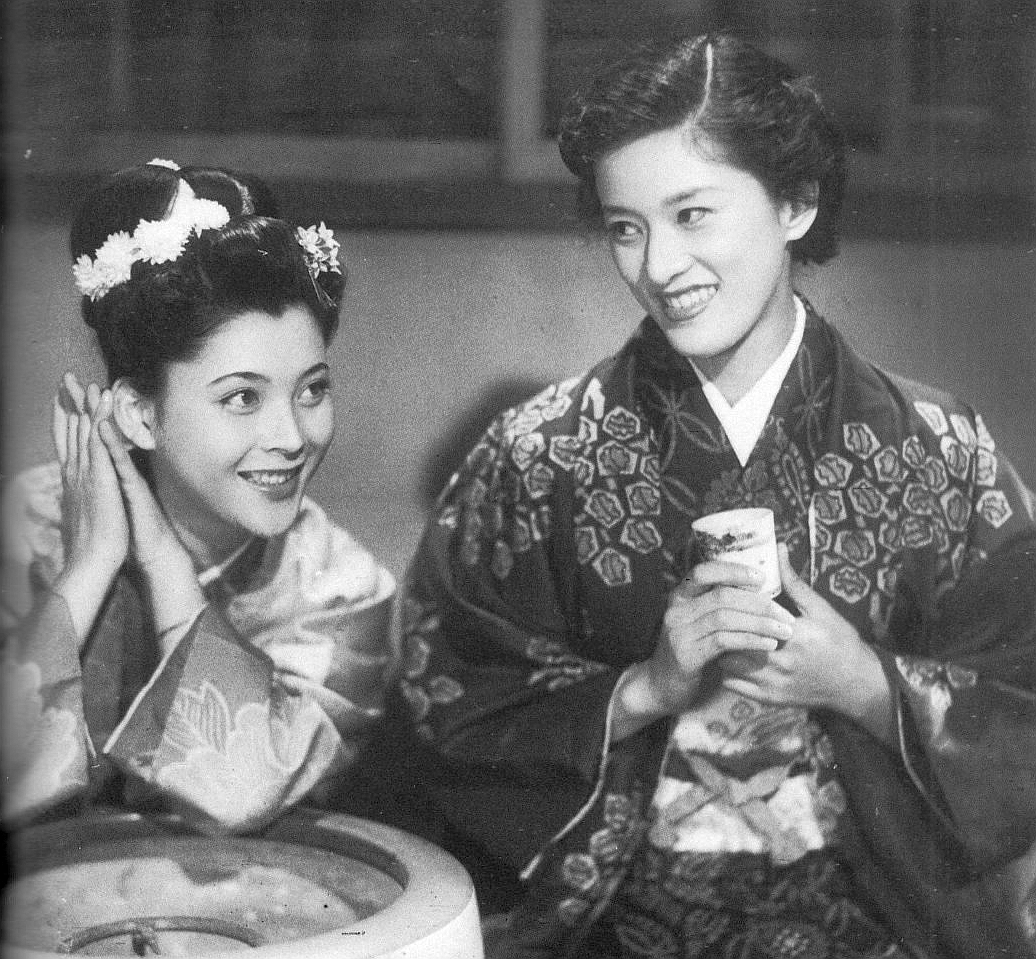
Mariko Okada and Yoko Sugi in Husband and Wife (1953)

Year	Title	Role	Notes
1951	Dancing Girl	Shinako	
1953	Husband and Wife	Kumiko, Shigekichi's sister	
1954	Samurai I: Musashi Miyamoto	Akemi	
1955	Floating Clouds	Sei Mukai	
1955	The Lone Journey	Otaka	
1955	Samurai II: Duel at Ichijoji Temple	Akemi	
1956	Flowing	Nanako	
1956	Samurai III: Duel at Ganryu Island	Akemi	
1957	Yagyu Secret Scrolls	Rika	
1957	When It Rains, It Pours	Matsuko Abe	
1960	Spring Dreams	Chizuko Okudaira	
1960	Late Autumn	Yuriko Sasaki	
1961	Hunting Rifle	Midori	
1961	Enraptured	Senya	
1962	An Autumn Afternoon	Akiko Hirayama	
1962	Akitsu Springs	Shinko	Also Producer
1964	The Scent of Incense	Tomoko	
1965	A Story Written with Water	Shizuka, Shizuo's mother	
1965	Illusion of Blood	Oiwa	
1966	Woman of the Lake	Miyako Mizuki	
1967	The Affair	Oriko	
1967	Flame and Women	Ritsuko Ibuki	
1968	Affair in the Snow	Yuriko Anzai	
1968	Farewell to the Summer Light	Naoko Toba	
1969	Eros + Massacre	Noe Ito	
1970	Heroic Purgatory	Nanako, Rikiya's wife	
1971	Confessions Among Actresses	Shoko Ichimori	
1977	Proof of the Man	Kyoko Yasugi	
1978	The Fall of Ako Castle	Riku	
1982	Conquest	Hiroko Tadokoro	
1985	Tampopo	"Spaghetti Sensei", the etiquette coach	
1987	A Taxing Woman	Mitsuko Sugiura	
1998	The Geisha House	Hanaman's owner	
2002	Women in the Mirror	Ai Kawase	
2005	My God, My God, Why Hast Thou Forsaken Me?	Navi	

=== Television ===
Year	Title	Role	Notes
1978	The Yagyu Conspiracy	Lady Kasuga	
1985-1986	Sanada Taiheiki	Yodo-dono	

== Bibliography ==
- Joyū Okada Mariko (2009)

== Awards ==
- 1958: 13th Mainichi Film Awards - Performance by an Actress in a Supporting Role for Season of the Demon Girl (悪女の季節, Akujo no Kisetsu)
- 1962: 36th Kinema Junpo Awards - Performance by an Actress in a Leading Role for Love This Year (今年の恋, Kotoshi no Koi) and Kiriko's Fate (霧子の運命, Kiriko no Unmei)
- 1962: 17th Mainichi Film Awards - Performance by an Actress in a Leading Role for Love This Year and Akitsu Springs (秋津温泉, Akitsu Onsen)
- 1998: Golden Glory Award and Platinum Grand Prize, 8th Japan Movie Critics Awards
