= David Desser =

American academic

David Desser (born 1953) is emeritus professor of cinema studies at the University of Illinois at Urbana–Champaign and former director of that university's Unit for Cinema Studies. He is an expert in Asian cinema, particularly the cinema of Japan, as well as in Jewish cinema. He is the former editor of Cinema Journal, which is published by the Society for Cinema and Media Studies, the world's largest organization of scholars of cinema and media. He is currently co-editor of the Journal of Japanese and Korean Cinema.
