= Yoshishige Yoshida =

Japanese film director (1933–2022)

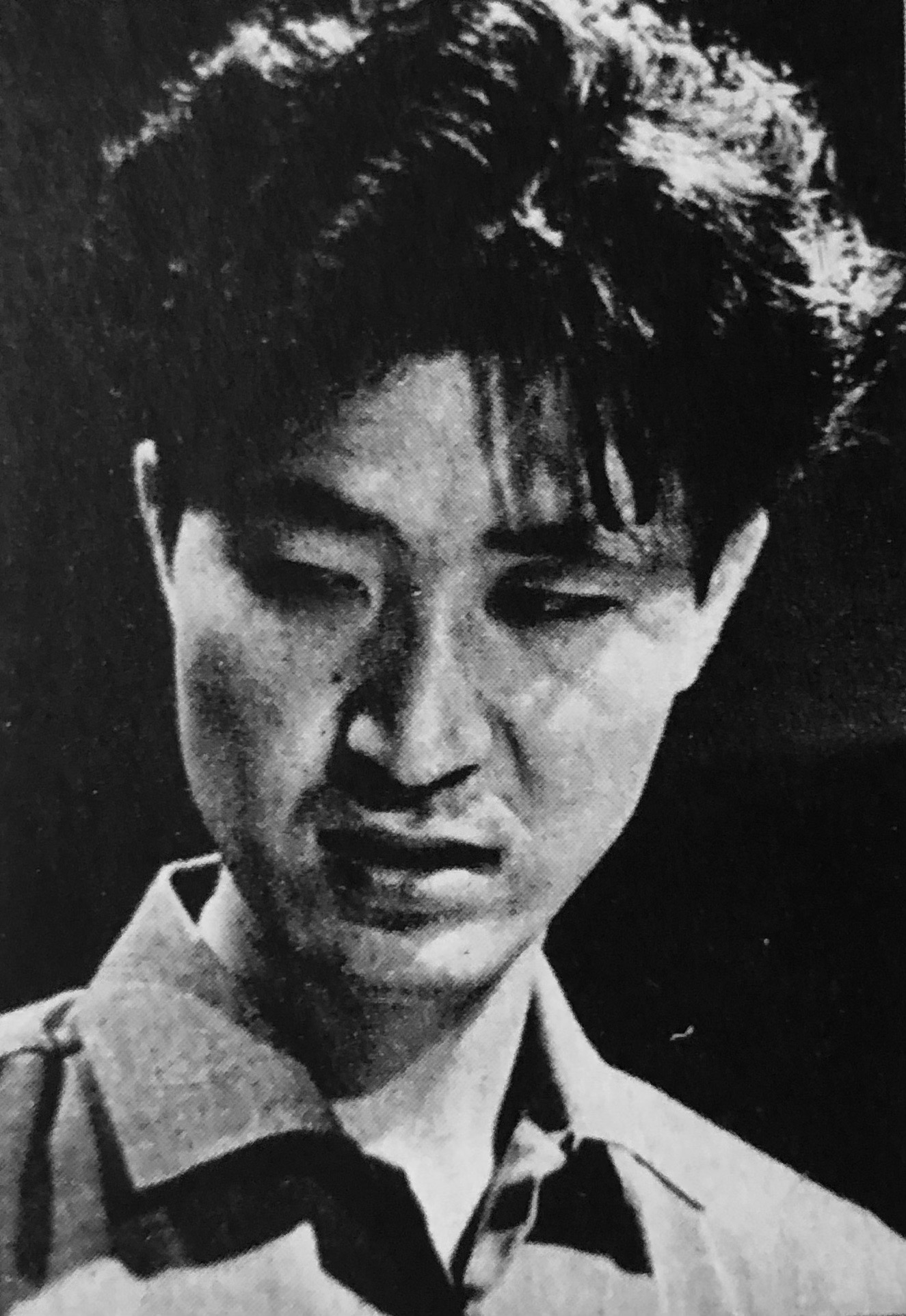
- in "Kinema Junpo" April 1962
- Born: 16 February 1933; Fukui, Empire of Japan
- Died: 8 December 2022 (aged 89); Shibuya, Tokyo, Japan
- Other name: Kijū Yoshida
- Occupations: Film director, screenwriter, writer
- Years active: 1960–2004
- Spouse: Mariko Okada (1964-2022)

Yoshishige Yoshida (吉田 喜重, Yoshida Yoshishige; 16 February 1933 – 8 December 2022), also known as Kijū Yoshida, was a Japanese film director and screenwriter.

== Life and career ==
Graduating from the University of Tokyo, where he studied French literature, Yoshida entered the Shōchiku studio in 1955 and worked as an assistant to Keisuke Kinoshita, before debuting as a director in 1960 with Rokudenashi. He was a central member of what came to be called the "Shōchiku Nouvelle Vague" along with Nagisa Oshima and Masahiro Shinoda, and his works have been studied under the larger rubric of the Japanese New Wave, a linkage which Yoshida himself disliked. Like many of his New Wave cohorts, he felt restricted under the studio system. After Shōchiku's re-editing of his Escape from Japan (1964), he left the studio to start his own production company, for which he directed such films as Eros + Massacre.

Between 1960 and 2004, Yoshida directed more than 20 films, some of which starred his wife, actress Mariko Okada. After a long absence from the screen following the 1973 Coup d'État, he returned with A Promise, which was shown in the Un Certain Regard section of the 1986 Cannes Film Festival. Two years later, his film Wuthering Heights would compete for the Golden Palm at the 1988 Festival. In 2002, Women in the Mirror followed after another hiatus of 14 years. In addition to his theatrical films, Yoshida directed a series of documentaries for Japanese TV.

Yoshida named European cinema as a great influence on his work, most notably the directors Ingmar Bergman and Michelangelo Antonioni, and pre-war French films like the works of Jean Renoir. He also published a number of books on the topic of cinema, including one on his own cinematic work and an analysis of the films of Yasujirō Ozu.

Yoshida died from pneumonia at a hospital in Shibuya, on 8 December 2022, at the age of 89.

== Selected filmography ==
=== Film ===
- Good-for-Nothing (1960)
- Blood Is Dry (1960)
- Bitter End of a Sweet Night (1961)
- Akitsu Springs (1962)
- 18 Who Cause a Storm (1963)
- Escape from Japan (1964)
- A Story Written with Water (1965)
- Woman of the Lake (1966)
- The Affair (1967)
- Flame and Women a.k.a. Impasse (1967)
- Affair in the Snow (1968)
- Farewell to the Summer Light (1968)
- Eros + Massacre (1969)
- Heroic Purgatory (1970)
- Confessions Among Actresses (1971)
- Coup d'État (1973)
- A Promise (1986)
- Wuthering Heights (1988)
- Lumière and Company (segment, 1995)
- Women in the Mirror (2002)
- Welcome to São Paulo (segment, 2004)

=== Television ===
- Beauty of Beauty a.k.a. Bi no bi (1974–1977)
- The Cinema of Ozu According to Kiju Yoshida (1993)

== Selected bibliography ==
- Yoshida, Kijū (1984). Mehiko yorokobashiki inyu. Tokyo: Iwanami Shoten Publishers. ISBN 978-2-918040-46-0.
- Yoshida, Kiju (2003). Ozu's Anti-Cinema. Ann Arbor: Center for Japanese Studies, University of Michigan. ISBN 978-1-929280-27-8. OCLC 53013473.
- Yoshida, Kijū (December 2010). "My Theory of Film: A Logic of Self-Negation". Review of Japanese Culture and Society. 22: 104–109.
