= List of Japanese-language films =

This is a partial list of Japanese language films:

== 0-9 ==
- 2LDK (2002)
- 964 Pinocchio (1991)

== A ==
- About Love (2005)
- Adrenaline Drive (1999)
- After Life (1998)
- Aiki (2002)
- Akira (1988)
- Alakazam the Great (1960)
- Alive (2002)
- All About Lily Chou-Chou (Rirī Shushu no Subete) (2001)
- All Monsters Attack (Gojira, Minira, Gabara: Ōru Kaijū Daishingeki) (1969)
- Another Heaven (2000)
- Angel's Egg (Tenshi no Tamago) (1985)
- Appleseed (2004)
- Appleseed Ex Machina (2007)
- Aragami (2003)
- Assassination Classroom (2015)
- Atragon (1963)
- Audition (1999)
- An Autumn Afternoon (Sanma no Aji) (1962)
- Avalon (2001)
- Azumi (2003)
- Azumi 2: Death or Love (2005)

== B ==
- Backdancers! (2006)
- The Bad Sleep Well (Warui yatsu hodo yoku nemuru) (1960)
- The Ballad of Narayama (Narayama bushikou) (1958)
- Battle Royale (2000)
- Battle Royale II: Requiem (2003)
- Blood and Bones (2004)
- Blood: The Last Vampire (2000)
- Big Bang Love, Juvenile A (2006)
- Big Man Japan (2007)
- The Bird People in China (Chûgoku no chôjin) (1998)
- Black Rain (Kuroi Ame) (1989)
- Blue Spring (Aoi haru) (2001)
- Boiling Point (3-4X jugatsu) (1990)
- Bounce ko gals (1998)
- Branded to Kill (Koroshi no Rakuin) (1967)
- Bright Future (Akarui Mirai) (2003)
- Brother (2000)
- Bubble Fiction: Boom or Bust (2007)
- The Burmese Harp aka Harp of Burma (Biruma no tategoto) (1956, with a remake in 1985)

== C ==
- Casshern (2004)
- Castle in the Sky (Tenkū no Shiro Rapyuta) (1986)
- The Castle of Cagliostro (Rupan Sansei: Kariosutoro no Shiro) (1979)
- The Cat Returns (Neko no Ongaeshi) (2002)
- Chushingura: Hana no Maki, Yuki no Maki (1962)
- Cleopatra (1970)
- Cruel Story of Youth (Seishun Zankoku Monogatari) (1960)
- Cure (1997)
- Cutie Honey (2004)

== D ==
- Dark Water (Honogurai mizu no soko kara) (2002)
- Death Note (2006)
- Densha Otoko (2005)
- Dersu Uzala (1975)
- Destroy All Monsters (Kaijū Sōshingeki) (1968)
- Distance (2001)
- Dodesukaden (1970)
- Dogora (1964)
- Dolls (2002)
- Doraemon films
- Double Suicide (Shinjû: Ten no amijima) (1969)
- Dreams (Yume) (1990)
- Drugstore Girl (2003)
- Drunken Angel (Yoidore Tenshi) (1948)

== E ==
- Early Spring (1956)
- Early Summer (1951)
- The Eel (1991)
- Eros Plus Massacre (1970)
- Equinox Flower (1958)
- Eureka (2000)

== F ==
- The Family Game (1983)
- Female Yakuza Tale: Inquisition and Torture (1973)
- Fires on the Plain (Nobi) (1959)
- The Flavor of Green Tea over Rice (Ochazuke no aji) (1952)
- Floating Weeds (Ukikusa) (1959)
- Flying Phantom Ship (1969)
- The Funeral (Ososhiki) (1984)

== G ==
- G@me (2003)
- Gamera vs. Jiger (1970)
- Gamera vs. Zigra (1971)
- Genius Party (2007)
- Genius Party Beyond (2008)
- Getting Any? (Minnā, yatteru ka?) (1995)
- Get Up! (Geroppa!) (2003)
- Ghidorah, the Three-Headed Monster (1964)
- Ghost in the Shell (1995)
- Ghost Stories of Wanderer at Honjo (1957)
- Glory to the Filmmaker! (2007)
- Gigantis, the Fire Monster (1955)
- Go (2001)
- Go, Go Second Time Virgin (1969)
- Godzilla (1954)
- Godzilla vs. Biollante (1989)
- Godzilla vs. Destoroyah (1995)
- Godzilla vs. Gigan (1972)
- Godzilla vs. Hedorah (1971)
- Godzilla vs. King Ghidorah (1991)
- Godzilla vs. Mechagodzilla (1974)
- Godzilla vs. Mechagodzilla II (1993)
- Godzilla vs. Megalon (1973)
- Godzilla vs. Mothra (1992)
- Godzilla vs. SpaceGodzilla (1994)
- Godzilla vs. the Sea Monster (aka Ebirah, Horror of the Deep) (1966)
- Godzilla: Final Wars (2004)
- Gojoe: Spirit War Chronicle (2000)
- Good Morning (Ohayō) (1959)
- Gonin (1995)
- Gorath (1962)
- Gozu (2003)
- Grave of the Fireflies (Hotaru no Haka) (1988)

== H ==
- Hana-bi (1997)
- The Happiness of the Katakuris (Katakuri-ke no kōfuku) (2001)
- Harakiri (1962)
- Helen the Baby Fox (Kogitsune Helen) (2006)
- The Hidden Fortress (Kakushi toride no san akunin) (1958)
- High and Low (Tengoku to jigoku) (1963)
- Himitsu (1999)
- Hols: Prince of the Sun (Taiyō no Ōji: Horusu no Daibōken) (1968)
- House of Himiko (Mezon do Himiko, La Maison de Himiko) (2005)
- Howl's Moving Castle (Hauru no ugoku shiro) (2004)
- The Human Condition trilogy (1959–61)
- Humanity and Paper Balloons (Ninjo Kami Fusen) (1937)

== I ==
- I.K.U. (2001)
- I Can Hear the Sea (Umi ga Kikoeru) (1993)
- I Like You, I Like You Very Much (Anata-ga suki desu, dai suki desu) (1994)
- Ichi the Killer (Koroshiya Ichi) (2001)
- The Idiot (Hakuchi) (1951)
- Ikiru (1952)
- In the Realm of the Senses (Ai no Corrida) (1976)
- Innocence: Ghost in the Shell (2004)
- Inochi (2002 )
- It's Only Talk (2005)
- The Insect Woman (1963)
- Invasion of Astro-Monster (1965)
- Izo (2004)

== J ==
- Jam Films (2002)
- Jam Films 2 (2003)
- Jam Films S (2005)
- Jin-Roh (1999)
- Ju-on
- Justice (2002)

== K ==
- Kagemusha (1980)
- Kairo (2001)
- Kamen Rider: The First (2005)
- Kamen Rider Kabuto: God Speed Love (2006)
- Kanto Wanderer (1963)
- Kids Return (1996)
- Kiki's Delivery Service (Majo no Takkyūbin) (1989)
- Kikujiro (1999)
- King Kong vs. Godzilla (1962)
- Kwaidan (1964)
- Kagen no Tsuki (2004)

== L ==
- Lady Joker (2004)
- Lady Sazen and the Drenched Swallow Sword (On'na hidarizen nuretsubame katate kiri) (1969)
- The Last Dance (Daibyonin) (1993)
- Late Autumn (Akibiyori) (1960)
- Late Chrysanthemums
- Late Spring (Banshun) (1949)
- La Maison de Himiko aka Mezon do Himiko, House of Himiko (2005)
- Legendary Crocodile, Jake and His Friends
- The Life of Oharu (1952)
- Longinus (2004)
- Love & Pop (1998)
- Love Is Strength (1930)
- Love Letter (1995)
- The Lower Depths (1957)
- Lupin III: The Mystery of Mamo (1978)

== M ==
- Maborosi (1995)
- Maiko Haaaan!!! (2007)
- The Makioka Sisters (1983)
- Matango (1963)
- Memories (1995)
- Merry Christmas, Mr. Lawrence (1983)
- Metropolis (2001)
- Mezon do Himiko aka House of Himiko, La Maison de Himiko (2005)
- Millennium Actress (2001)
- Minbo (1992)
- Momotaro's Divine Sea Warriors (1945)
- Moon Child (2003)
- Mothra vs. Godzilla (1964)
- Mura no Shashinshuu
- My Neighbor Totoro (Tonari no Totoro) (1988)

== N ==
- Naked Blood (1996)
- The Naked Island (1960)
- Nana (2005)
- Nana 2 (2006)
- Nausicaä of the Valley of the Wind (Kaze no tani no Naushika) (1984)
- Night and Fog in Japan (Nihon no yoru to kiri) (1960)
- Nobody Knows (Dare mo shiranai) (2004)
- Norwegian Wood (Noruwei no mori) (2010)

== O ==
- One Missed Call (Chakushin Ari) (2003)
- One Missed Call 2 (Chakushin Ari 2) (2005)
- One Missed Call: Final (Chakushin Ari Final) (2006)
- Onibaba (1964)
- Only Yesterday (Omohide poro poro) (1991)
- Onmyoji (2001)
- Onmyoji II (2003)
- Otoko wa Tsurai yo (1969-95)
- Otoko-tachi no Yamato (2005)

== P ==
- Paprika (2006)
- Perfect Blue (1997)
- Pistol Opera (2001)
- Pom Poko (Heisei Tanuki Gassen Ponpoko) (1994)
- Ponyo (Gake no Ue no Ponyo) (2008)
- Porco Rosso (Kurenai no Buta) (1992)
- Princess Mononoke (Mononoke Hime) (1997)
- Princess Raccoon (Operetta Tanuki Goten) (2005)

== Q ==
- Quill (2004)
- Queer Boys and Girls on the Shinkansen (2004)

== R ==
- Ran (1985)
- Rashomon (1950)
- Red Beard (Akahige) (1965)
- Repast (1951)
- The Return of Godzilla (1984)
- Returner (2002)
- Ring (1998)
- Ring 0: Birthday (2000)
- Ring 2 (1999)
- Royal Space Force: The Wings of Honneamise (1987)
- Ryu ga Gotoku (2007)
- Ringing Bell (1978)

== S ==
- Salaryman Kintarō (1999)
- Samurai I (1954)
- Samurai II (1955)
- Samurai III (1956)
- Sanjuro (Tsubaki Sanjūrō) (1962)
- Sanshiro Sugata (1943)
- Sansho the Bailiff (1954)
- A Scene at the Sea (1991)
- The Sea Is Watching (2002)
- Seven Samurai (1954)
- Shall We Dance? (1996)
- Shiki-Jitsu (2000)
- Shimotsuma Monogatari (aka Kamikaze Girls) (2004)
- Sky High (2003)
- Son of Godzilla (1967)
- Sonatine (1993)
- Spiral (1998)
- Spirited Away (Sen to Chihiro no Kamikakushi) (2001)
- Spring Snow (2005)
- Steamboy (2004)
- Stray Dog (Nora-inu) (1949)
- Suicide Club (Jisatsu Sākuru) (2000)
- Suicide Manual (2003)
- Sukiyaki Western: Django (2007)
- Sun Scarred (2006)
- Supermarket Woman (1996)
- Survive Style 5+ (2004)
- Swallowtail Butterfly (1996)
- Swing Girls (2004)
- Sword of Alexander (2007)
- The Sword of Doom (1966)

== T ==
- Taboo (Gohatto) (1999)
- Takeshis' (2005)
- The Tale of the White Serpent (1958)
- Tales from Earthsea (2006)
- Tales of a Golden Geisha (1990)
- Tampopo (1985)
- The Taste of Tea (2004)
- Tattooed Life (Irezumi ichidai) (1965)
- A Taxing Woman (Marusa no onna) (1987)
- A Taxing Woman 2 (1988)
- Tenshi (2005)
- Terror of Mechagodzilla (1975)
- Tetsuo: The Iron Man (1989)
- Tetsuo II: Body Hammer (1992)
- Throne of Blood (Kumonosu-jō ) (1957)
- Tokyo Decadence aka Topaz (Topāzu) (1992)
- Tokyo Eyes (1998)
- Tokyo Godfathers (2003)
- Tokyo Story (Tokyo Monogatari) (1953)
- Tony Takitani (2004)
- The Twilight Samurai (2002)

== U ==
- Ugetsu (1953)
- Under the Flag of the Rising Sun (1972)
- Unlock Your Heart (2021)
- Umizaru (2004)
- Uzumaki (2000)

== V ==
- Vampire Hunter D (1985)
- Vampire Hunter D: Bloodlust (2000)
- Versus (2000)
- Vexille (2007)
- Violent Cop (Sono otoko, kyōbō ni tsuki) (1989)
- Virus (1980)
- Vital (2004)

== W ==
- Waru (2006)
- Waru: kanketsu-hen (2006)
- Waterboys (2001)
- Welcome Back, Mr. McDonald (1997)
- When a Woman Ascends the Stairs (1960)
- When the Last Sword Is Drawn (Mibu gishi den) (2003)
- Whisper of the Heart (Mimi wo Sumaseba) (1995)
- wkw/tk/1996@7'55"hk.net (1996)
- Woman in the Dunes (Suna no Onna) (1964)

== Y ==
- Yojimbo (1961)
- Yumeji (1991)

== Z ==
- Zatōichi series (1962–89)
- Zatōichi (2003)
- Zebraman (2004)
- Zigeunerweisen (Tsigoineruwaizen) (1980)

== See also ==
- List of foreign films set in Japan
