= Masahiko Tsugawa =

Japanese actor and film director (1940–2018)

- 津川 雅彦
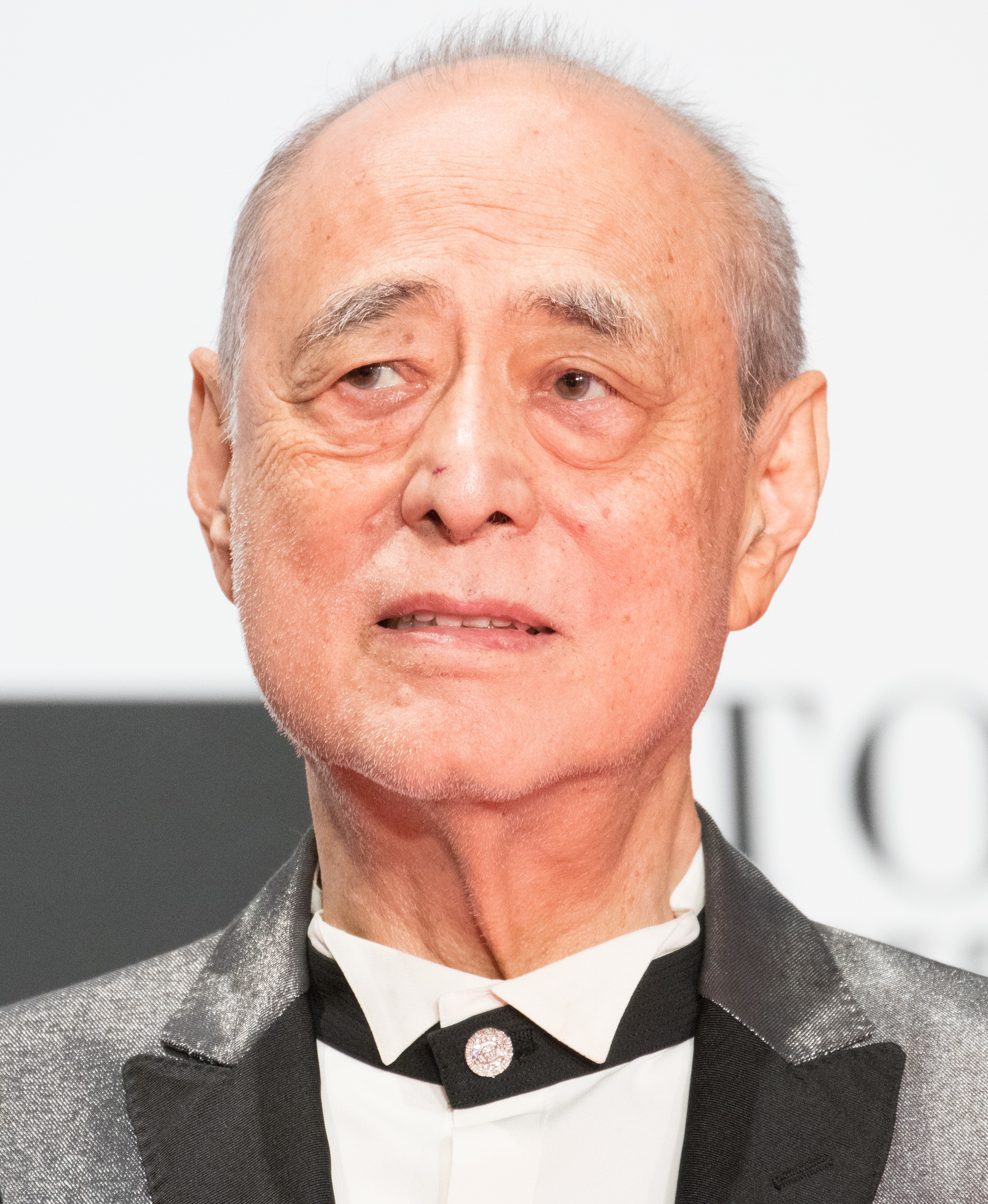
- Tsugawa in 2016
- Born: Masahiko Katō; 2 January 1940; Kyoto, Kyoto, Empire of Japan
- Died: August 4, 2018 (aged 78)
- Other name: Masahiko Makino
- Occupations: Actor; film director; critic
- Years active: 1945–2018
- Agent: Grandpa Pro Productions
- Spouse: Yukiji Asaoka (m. 1973–2018)
- Father: Kunitaro Sawamura

Masahiko Tsugawa (津川 雅彦, Tsugawa Masahiko), born Masahiko Katō (加藤 雅彦 Katō Masahiko; January 2, 1940 – August 4, 2018) was a Japanese actor and director.

== Career ==
Tsugawa was born January 2, 1940, in Kyoto, Japan. After acting as a child, he made his major debut at 16 in the Kō Nakahira film Crazed Fruit in 1956. Tsugawa's family was deeply rooted in the film industry since before his birth. Tsugawa attended school until dropping out of Waseda University Graduate School to pursue acting.

Tsugawa gained popularity playing villain roles in TV jidaigeki drama series as the Hissatsu series and appeared in films like Otoko wa tsurai yo: Watashi no Tora-san and Godzilla, Mothra and King Ghidorah: Giant Monsters All-Out Attack. He became a favorite actor of director Juzo Itami, appearing in nearly all his films since Tampopo.

In television, Tsugawa portrayed Tokugawa Ieyasu five times, including in the 2000 Aoi Tokugawa Sandai becoming the oldest lead actor in a Taiga drama.

Tsugawa recently debuted as a director under the pseudonym Makino Masahiko with his film A Hardest Night!!. He chose this name because he is the nephew of the Japanese director Masahiro Makino, his mother's brother. Legend has it that Tsugawa was so awed by the director while watching him at work as a young child that he asked if he could use Makino as his last name should he ever be a director, because of the similarities of the first names.

Tsugawa comes from an illustrious film family. His older brother Hiroyuki Nagato was an actor. His wife Yukiji Asaoka was an actress. His grandfather is the director Shōzō Makino, his father, Kunitarō Sawamura, and his mother, Tomoko Makino, were both actors. His aunt and uncle through his father are the actors Sadako Sawamura and Daisuke Katō.

Tsugawa died on August 4, 2018, due to heart failure. He was 78.

== Filmography ==
=== Director ===
- Asahiyama Zoo Story: Penguins in the Sky (2009)

=== Film ===
- Kojiki Taishō (1952), Hanawaka
- Sansho the Bailiff (1954), Zushiō as a Boy
- Crazed Fruit (1956)
- Farewell to Spring (1959)
- Night and Fog in Japan (1960)
- The Sun's Burial (1960)
- Rokudenashi (Good-for-nothing) (1960)
- Bitter End of a Sweet Night (1961)
- Drunkard's Paradise (1961)
- Cuban Lover (1969)
- Otoko wa tsurai yo: Watashi no tora-san (1973)
- Manon (1981)
- The Rape (1982)
- Time and Tide (1984)
- The Funeral (1984)
- Tampopo (1985)
- Hitohira no yuki (1985)
- A Taxing Woman (1987), Hanamura
- A Taxing Woman 2 (1988), Hanamura
- A-Ge-Man: Tales of a Golden Geisha (1990)
- Heaven and Earth (1990), Takeda Shingen
- Minbo (1992)
- The Strange Story of Oyuki (1992)
- Daibyonin (1993), Dr. Ogata
- Crest of Betrayal (1994), Ōishi Kuranosuke
- A Last Note (1995)
- Supermarket Woman (1996), Goro
- Hissatsu! Mondo Shisu (1996)
- Marutai no Onna (1997)
- Pride: The Fateful Moment (1998), Prime Minister Hideki Tojo
- Gamera 3: Revenge of Iris (1999)
- Godzilla, Mothra and King Ghidorah: Giant Monsters All-Out Attack (2001)
- The Man in White (2003)
- What the Snow Brings (2005)
- The Uchōten Hotel (2006)
- Death Note (2006), Police Chief Saeki
- Death Note 2: The Last Name (2006), Police Chief Saeki
- A Long Walk (2006)
- Hideo Nakata's Kaidan (2007)
- Genghis Khan: To the Ends of the Earth and Sea (2007)
- Aibō the Movie (2008)
- Postcard (2011)
- Strawberry Night (2013)
- 0.5mm (2014)
- Lady Maiko (2014)
- The Boy and the Beast (2015), Sōshi (voice)
- Solomon's Perjury 2: Judgment (2015)
- Black Widow Business (2016), Kōzō Nakase
- Ikitoshi Ikerumono (2017), narrator

=== Television ===
- Ryōma ga Yuku (1968), Kusaka Genzui
- Shinsho Taikōki (1973)
- Katsu Kaishū (1974), Tokugawa Yoshinobu
- Ōgon no Hibi (1978), Tsuda Sōgyū
- Tokugawa Ieyasu (1983), Ōkubo Nagayasu
- Ōoku (1983), Tokugawa Tsunayoshi
- Miyamoto Musashi (1984–85), Takuan Sōhō
- Hissastu Hashikakenin (1985), Ryūji
- Hagoku (1985), Keizaburō Suzue
- Dokuganryū Masamune (1987), Tokugawa Ieyasu
- Tokugawa bugeichō: Yagyū sandai no ken (1992), Tokugawa Ieyasu
- Hachidai Shōgun Yoshimune (1995), Tokugawa Tsunayoshi
- Kenpō wa Madaka (1996), Jōji Matsumoto
- Ieyasu ga mottomo osoreta otoko, Sanada Yukimura (1998), Tokugawa Ieyasu
- Furuhata Ninzaburō (1999)
- Aoi (2000), Tokugawa Ieyasu
- Chūshingura 1/47 (2001), Kira Kōzukenosuke
- Shounen wa Tori ni Natta (2001)
- Furuhata Ninzaburō The Spanish Embassy Murder (2004)
- Sengoku Jieitai: Sekigahara no Tatakai (2006), Tokugawa Ieyasu
- The Family (2007), Finance minister Nagata
- Ultraman Ginga (2013), Hotsuma Raido
- Samurai Rebellion (2013)
- Akagi (2015), Iwao Washizu
- Nobunaga Moyu (2016), Kaisen Joki
- Nemuri Kyoshirō The Final (2018)

=== Dubbing ===
- The Little Prince, the Aviator

== Awards and honors ==
=== Honor ===
- 2006 Awarded Medal of Honor with Purple Ribbon from H.M. The Emperor of Japan
- 2014 Awarded Order of the Rising Sun, Gold Rays with Rosette from H.M. The Emperor of Japan

=== Awards ===
- 1982 Blue Ribbon Awards for Best Supporting Actor
- 1986 Japanese Academy Awards Best Supporting Actor nomination for Flakes of Snow
- 1987 Mainichi Film Award Best Actor
- 1987 Hochi Film Award Best Supporting Actor nomination for A Taxing Woman
- 1988 Japanese Academy Awards Best Actor nomination for Wakarenu Riyu
- 1988 Japanese Academy Awards Best Supporting actor for A Taxing Woman
- 1993 Japanese Academy Awards Best Actor nomination The Strange Tale of Oyuki
- 1994 Nikkan Sports Film Award Best Supporting Actor
- 1995 Japanese Academy Awards Best Supporting Actor nomination for Lifetime Insecurity
- 1999 Japanese Academy Awards Best Actor nomination for Puraido: Unmei no toki
- 2014 Hochi Film Award Best Supporting Actor nomination for 0.5mm
