= A Taxing Woman =

1987 film by Jūzō Itami

- Theatrical poster for A Taxing Woman (1987)
- Directed by: Juzo Itami
- Written by: Juzo Itami
- Produced by: Seigo Hosogoe; Yasushi Tamaoki
- Starring: Nobuko Miyamoto; Tsutomu Yamazaki; Masahiko Tsugawa; Keiju Kobayashi; Mariko Okada
- Cinematography: Yonezo Maeda
- Edited by: Akira Suzuki
- Music by: Toshiyuki Honda
- Distributed by: Toho
- Release date: February 7, 1987 (Japan)
- Running time: 127 minutes
- Country: Japan
- Language: Japanese

A Taxing Woman (Japanese: マルサの女, Hepburn: Marusa no onna) (Note: Marusa (マルサ) is slang for the tax inspection division (査察部, sasatsubu) of the National Tax Agency, which uses a 査 in a circle (visually a seal) as their symbol. Reading this as a Japanese rebus monogram yields 〇査 = maru + sa.) is a 1987 Japanese film written and directed by Juzo Itami. It won numerous awards, including six major Japanese Academy awards. The title character of the film, played by Nobuko Miyamoto, is a tax investigator for the Japanese National Tax Agency who employs various techniques to catch tax evaders.

Itami took inspiration for the movie after entering a higher tax bracket following the success of his first film, The Funeral.

A sequel, A Taxing Woman's Return, featuring some of the same characters but darker in tone, was released in 1988.

== Plot ==
A female tax auditor, Ryōko Itakura, inspects the accounts of various Japanese companies, uncovering hidden incomes and recovering unpaid taxes.

One day Itakura persuades her boss to let her investigate the owner of a string of love hotels who seems to be avoiding tax, but after an investigation no evidence is found. During the investigation the inspector and the inspected owner, Hideki Gondō, develop an unspoken respect for each other.

Itakura is promoted to the post of government tax inspector. When the same case involving Gondō reappears Itakura is again allowed to investigate. During a sophisticated series of raids against the hotel owner's interests, she accidentally comes across a hidden room containing vital incriminating evidence.

Six months later the two meet again. Gondō is tired after daily interrogations. Itakura tries to persuade him to surrender his last secrets for the sake of his son. Gondō asks Itakura to leave her job and come live with him, but she declines. He cuts his finger and writes the name of the secret bank account in blood on a handkerchief of hers that he saved from the first time she investigated him.

== Cast ==
- Nobuko Miyamoto: Ryōko Itakura
- Tsutomu Yamazaki: Hideki Gondō
- Masahiko Tsugawa: Hanamura
- Yasuo Daichi: Ijūin
- Kinzoh Sakura: Kaneko
- Hajime Asō: Himeda
- Kiriko Shimizu: Kazue Kenmochi
- Kazuyo Matsui: Kumi Torikai
- Hideo Murota: Jūkichi Ishii
- Machiko Watanabe: Nurse
- Shōtarō Takeuchi: Rihei Hakamada
- Hideji Otaki: Tsuyuguchi
- Moeko Ezawa: Gondō's mistress
- Mitsuhiko Kiyohisa: Gondō's chauffeur
- Akira Shioji: Realtor
- Yoshihiro Kato: Yamada
- Mariko Okada: Mitsuko Sugiura
- Shinsuke Ashida: Ninagawa
- Kōichi Ueda: Ninagawa's confidant
- Yūsuke Nagumo: Ninagawa's henchman
- Shirō Itō: Owner of a pachinko parlor
- Eitaro Ozawa: Tax accountant
- Keiju Kobayashi: Boss
- Tokuko Sugiyama: Grocery store owner's wife

== Video game ==
An adventure video game of the same title was published by Capcom for the Family Computer in 1989 only in Japan.

== Reception ==
On the review aggregator website Rotten Tomatoes, 75% of 12 critics' reviews are positive. Derek Malcolm of The Guardian compared it favorably to Juzo Itami's other films saying "the films construction...is tighter and more logical." Roger Ebert of the Chicago Sun-Times gave the film two out of four stars saying, "I found 'A Taxing Woman' a disappointment after the lean economy of 'Tampopo.'"
