= Fukumi Kuroda =

Japanese actress (born 1956)

- Born: July 21, 1956 (age 69); Tokyo, Japan
- Occupation: Actress
- Years active: 1977–present
- Known for: Tampopo, Sweet Home

Fukumi Kuroda (黒田 福美, Kuroda Fukumi; born July 21, 1956 in Tokyo) is a Japanese actress.

== Career ==
Fukumi Kuroda appeared in the films such as Shohei Imamura's History of Postwar Japan as Told by a Bar Hostess, Juzo Itami's Tampopo, and Kiyoshi Kurosawa's Sweet Home.

== Filmography ==
=== Film ===
- Tampopo (1985) - Man in White Suit's mistress
- Sweet Home (1989) - Asuka
- Zansatsu Seyo Setsunaki Mono, Sore wa Ai (1990)
- Tales of a Golden Geisha (1990) - Kiyoka a geisha
- Shirayuri Gakuen Yokyubu (1992)
- Ahiru no Uta ga Kikoete Kuruyo (1993) - 'Yamanashi-Ya' no tsuma
- It's a Summer Vacation Everyday (1994) - Mrs. Kobayashi
- Karaoke (1999)
- Dodge Go! Go! (2002) - Headmaster
- Lakeside Murder Case (2004) - Kazue Fujima
- Sunshine Days (2008)
- Zero Focus (2009)
- Tôku no sora (2010)
- Banana to gurôbu to jinbeezame (2013) - Mariko domoto
- Tokyo teyande (2013)
- Reason of Life (2015) - Yoshimi Tachibana
- Shasen Henkō (TBA)

=== Television ===
- Dengeki Sentai Changeman (1985-1986) - Queen Ahames
- The Kindaichi Case Files (1995)
- Tsukisoibito no Uta (1998) - Sakazaki (head nurse)
- Stained Glass (2004)
- Muscle Girl! (2011) - Lee Soon-Ja
