= Kutsukake Tokijirō =

Kutsukake Tokijirō (沓掛 時次郎) is a character from a Japanese novel and a Japanese film character in following films:

- Kutsukake Tokijirō (1929 film) (沓掛時次郎)
- Kutsukake Tokijirō (1932 film)
- Kutsukake Tokijirō (1934 film)
- Kutsukake Tokijirō (1936 film)
- Kutsukake Tokijirō (1954 film) by Kiyoshi Saeki
- Kutsukake Tokijirō (1961 film)
- Kutsukake Tokijirō: yukyo ippiki (沓掛時次郎 遊侠一匹), 1966 film by Yorozuya Kinnosuke
