= Toshiyuki Honda =

- Born: April 9, 1957 (age 68); Tokyo, Japan
- Genres: Jazz
- Occupation: Musician
- Instrument(s): flute and saxophone
- Years active: 1976 – present

Toshiyuki Honda (本多 俊之, Honda Toshiyuki; born April 9, 1957) is a Japanese jazz musician and composer.

Honda's father was a jazz critic, whose name was also Toshiyuki Honda. As a jazz musician, he learned flute and saxophone, and worked in the late 1970s with George Otsuka and the Burning Waves ensemble. In the 1980s he worked with Chick Corea, Tatsuya Takahashi, and Kazumi Watanabe, as well as leading his own ensemble, Super Quartet. He was also a member of the ensemble Native Son.

Starting in the late 1980s, Honda turned increasingly toward composing for film and television, as well as working in record producing. He composed the soundtrack for the Juzo Itami film A Taxing Woman in 1987, which raised his prominence as a film scorer. He went on to compose the score for all but one of the rest of Itami's films.

== Discography ==
=== Studio albums ===
- Burnin' Waves (Electric Bird, 1978), re-released in 2023 by Holy Basil Records
- Opa! Com Deus (Electric Bird, 1979)
- Easy Breathing (Electric Bird, 1980)
- Boomerang as Toshiyuki Honda & Burning Waves (Electric Bird, 1981)
- Spanish Tears as Toshiyuki Honda & Burning Waves (Electric Bird, 1981)
- Toshiyuki Honda (Electric Bird, 1982)
- Shangri-La (Eastworld, 1982)
- September as Toshiyuki Honda & The New Burning Wave (Eastworld, 1983)
- Dream with Chick Corea, Miroslav Vitous, Roy Haynes (Eastworld, 1983)
- Modern (Eastworld, 1984)
- The Super Quartet as Toshiyuki Honda featuring The Super Quartet (Eastworld, 1986)
- Day Dream (Eastworld, 1986)
- Radio Club (Eastworld, 1987)
- Something Coming On as Toshiyuki Honda Radio Club (Who Ring, 1988)
- Symbiosis (Who Ring, 1990), featuring music from A-Ge-Man: Tales of a Golden Geisha, A Taxing Woman, and A Taxing Woman's Return
- Relax (Who Ring, 1991)
- Reed My Lips (Who Ring, 1992)
- Cool Jewel (Who Ring, 1994)
- SAX・HOLIC (Who Ring, 1996)
- High Five as Trouvère Quartet and Toshiyuki Honda (EMI Music Japan, 1997)

=== Soundtrack albums and film scores ===
- A Taxing Woman (1987), released as The Woman from Marusa
- A Taxing Woman's Return (1988)
- Gunhed (1989)
- A-Ge-Man: Tales of a Golden Geisha (1990)
- Minbo (1992)
- The Last Dance (1993)
- Supermarket Woman (1996)
- Marutai no Onna (1997)
- Metropolis (2001)
- Autumn in Warsaw (2003)
- Nasu: Summer in Andalusia (2003)
- Rebellion: The Killing Isle (2008)
