= Juzo Itami Award =

Japanese award for literary and visual expression

- Awarded for: Excellence in literary and visual expression
- Location: Itami Juzo Museum; Matsuyama, Ehime, Japan
- Presented by: ITM Itami Memorial Foundation
- First award: 2009
- Currently held by: Sachiko Kishimoto
- Website: itami-kinenkan.jp/award/

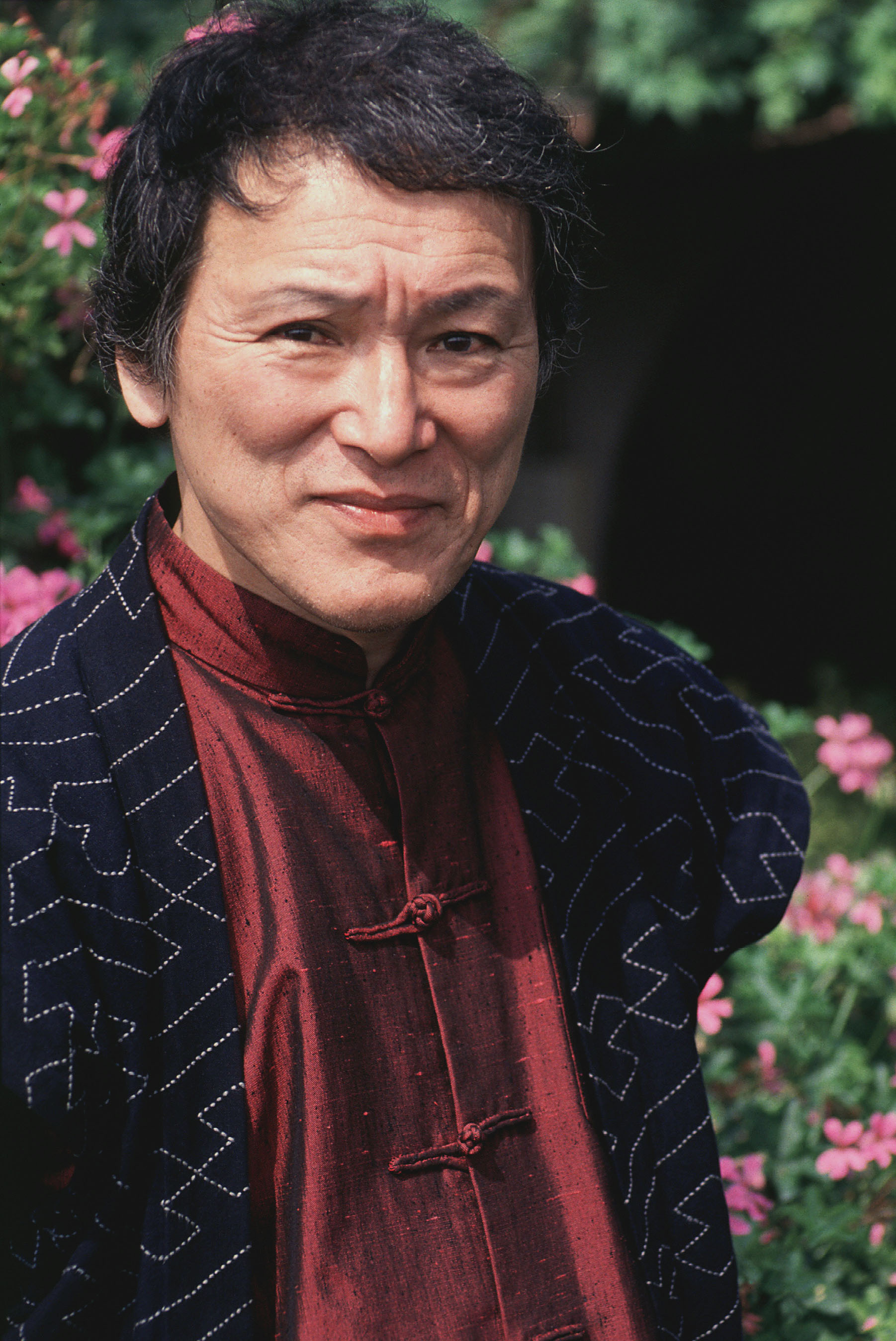
Juzo Itami

The Juzo Itami Award (伊丹十三賞, Itami Jūzō Shō) honors achievement and outstanding talent in any of the myriad fields in which its namesake Juzo Itami worked, including essay writing, non-fiction literature, translation, film editing and directing, cooking, television, TV commercials, acting, illustration, and graphic design. The prize, worth ¥1 million, is presented annually by the ITM Itami Memorial Foundation in collaboration with Itami Productions.

As of 2026, the selection committee comprises film director Masayuki Suo, essayist Junko Sakai, and illustrator Shinbo Minami. Former committee members include architect Yoshifumi Nakamura and essayist Yoko Hiramatsu.

== History and details ==
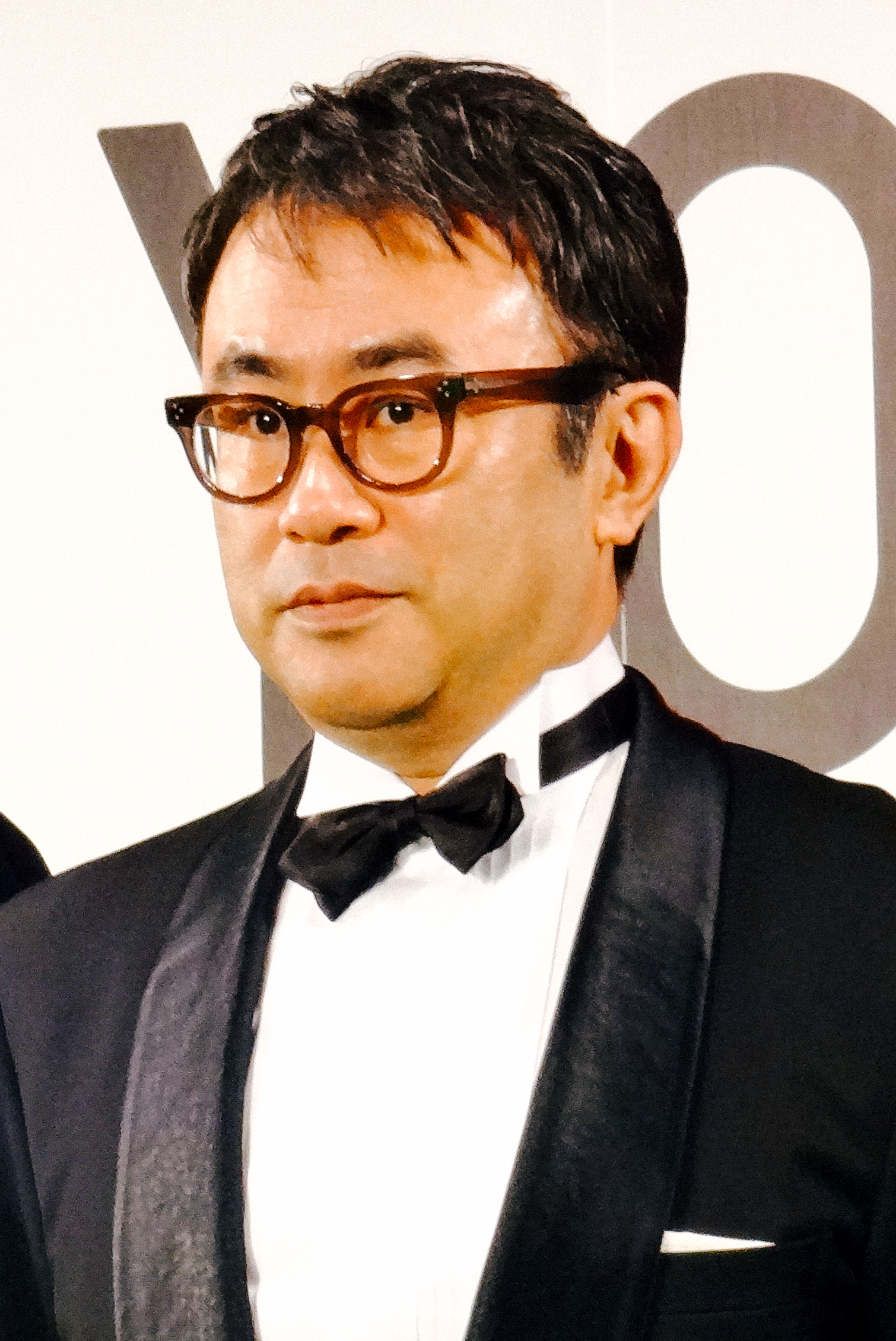
Kōki Mitani, 2023 winner

The Juzo Itami Award was established in March 2009, twelve years after Itami's death, with the help of his wife, Nobuko Miyamoto. Originally focusing on excellence in literary expression in odd-numbered years and visual expression in even-numbered years, its two categories were unified and its cadence changed to yearly in 2011.

In 2013, journalist Akira Ikegami donated his entire monetary award to the World Food Programme.

== Winners ==
- 2026 (18th annual award) – Sachiko Kishimoto
- 2025 (17th annual award) – Gorō Yamada
- 2024 (16th annual award) – Non
- 2023 (15th annual award) – Kōki Mitani
- 2022 (14th annual award) – Kazuko Koike
- 2021 (13th annual award) – Michiko Shimizu
- 2020 (12th annual award) – Kankurō Kudō
- 2019 (11th annual award) – Nanafuku Tamagawa
- 2018 (10th annual award) – Michifumi Isoda
- 2017 (9th annual award) – Gen Hoshino
- 2016 (8th annual award) – Hirokazu Kore-eda
- 2015 (7th annual award) – Toshinori Arai
- 2014 (6th annual award) – Lily Franky
- 2013 (5th annual award) – Akira Ikegami
- 2012 (4th annual award) – Chie Morimoto
- 2011 (3rd annual award) – Tatsuru Uchida
- 2010 (2nd annual award) – Tamori
- 2009 (1st annual award) – Shigesato Itoi
