= Supermarket Woman =

- Directed by: Juzo Itami
- Screenplay by: Juzo Itami
- Produced by: Takashi Kawasaki
- Starring: Nobuko Miyamoto; Masahiko Tsugawa; Ryunosuke Kaneda
- Cinematography: Yonezo Maeda
- Edited by: Akira Suzuki
- Music by: Toshiyuki Honda
- Production company: Itami Films
- Distributed by: Toho
- Release dates: 5 June 1996 (Seattle Film Festival); 15 June 1996 (Japan)
- Running time: 127 minutes
- Country: Japan
- Language: Japanese
- Box office: $13.9 million (Japan)

Supermarket Woman (スーパーの女, Sūpā no onna) is a 1996 Japanese comedy romance film written and directed by Juzo Itami.

The film stars Juzo's wife and regular leading-lady Nobuko Miyamoto as a woman who is hired by a failing supermarket to help it compete against an aggressive local rival. Another frequent star of Juzo's films, Masahiko Tsugawa, plays her boss and later romantic interest.

Supermarket Woman was a box-office success in Japan and was nominated for six Japanese Academy Awards in 1997, including Best Film, Director and Actress, but did not win in any categories.

== Plot ==
A new supermarket 'Bargains Galore' opens, and threatens the longer-established 'Honest Goro' with its aggressive price cutting. The owner of 'Honest Goro' (Goro, played by Masahiko Tsugawa) inspects the new store, and bumps into an old classmate he hasn't seen for years (Hanako, played by Nobuko Miyamoto). She uses her 'housewife's know-how' to show him why his supermarket is performing so badly. He resolves to make his supermarket the best in Japan, and gives her a job as head cashier.

She helps to improve customer service and introduces new sales techniques and a policy of selling only fresh food. However, in doing so she angers senior staff members who don't want to change their ways. However, the store gradually attracts more customers.

Meanwhile, the manager of 'Honest Goro' is taking bribes from 'Bargains Galore', and eventually resigns to start work at the new supermarket, trying to take the rest of the staff with him. After an impassioned speech by Hanako, the majority decide to remain loyal to Goro, and redouble their efforts to provide customer satisfaction.

In a last-ditch attempt to sabotage Goro, the old manager and the head butcher attempt to steal all the store's meat. Hanako discovers them, and is locked in the back of their freezer van when they drive off. Goro pursues them in a dekotora, and after a high-speed chase Hanako is saved.

'Honest Goro' opens on New Year's Day to a store full of customers, while 'Bargain's Galore' is practically empty.

== Cast ==
- Nobuko Miyamoto as Hanako Inoue
- Masahiko Tsugawa as Gorô Kobayashi
- Naomasa Musaka as the Meat Department Chief
- Shingo Yanagisawa as Take-chan (Meat Department assistant)
- Manpuku Kin as Gori (Meat Department assistant)
- Choei Takahashi as Shin-chan (Fish Department Chief)
- Hikaru Ijūin as Kin-chan (Fish Department assistant)
- Moeko Ezawa and Hideko Hara as Fish Department part-timers
- Yuji Miyake as Kiyo-chan (Produce Department Chief)
- Keita Tsukui as Mitsuru (Produce Department assistant)
- Isamu Ago as Produce Department worker
- Aki Takejō as Ume-san (Deli Department Chief)
- Akiko Matsumoto as Ikuyo-chan (Chief cashier)
- Kazuki Kosakai as Sales Promotion Department worker
- Satoku Saburo as parking attendant
- Ryunosuke Kaneda as Ichirô Kobayashi
- Chikako Isomura as Ichirô's familymember
- Sen Yano as Kikuni-chan (Store Manager)
- Shirō Itō as Bargains Galore president
- Yonesuke as Bargains Galore manager
- Masayuki Watanabe as Bargains Galore employee
- Shinoburyū as Bargains Galore bodyguard
- Yōko Nogiwa as customer with terrier
- Fumiyo Sako, Rie Shibata, Yōko Tajima, Satomi Achiwa, and Shinobu Kawamata as additional customers
- Nobuto Okamoto as rice ball supplier
- Mansaku Fuwa as meat dealer
- Kunitarō Sawamura as portrait of Goro's father
- Gajiro Satoh as dekotora driver
- Kitanonada Noboru as doctor
- Yoshiko Shimizu as nurse
- Kôen Okumura as fisherman
- Tomiko Ishii as fisherman's wife

== Release ==
Supermarket Woman had its world premiere at the Seattle Film Festival on 5 June 1996. Supermarket Woman was released in Japan on June 15, 1996 where it was distributed by Toho.

== Reception ==
In Japan, the film was popular among adult audiences, earning a distribution income (rentals) of ¥1.5 billion in 1996, making it the fifth highest-grossing Japanese film of the year. It grossed $13.9 million.
