= Shōgo Shimada (actor) =

Japanese actor

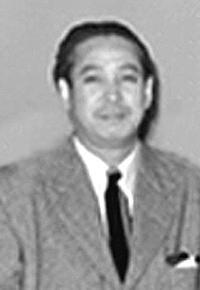
- Shimada in 1953
- Born: Kikutaro Hattori; 13 December 1905; Yokohama, Kanagawa, Japan
- Died: 26 January 2004 (aged 98); Meguro, Tokyo, Japan
- Occupation: Actor
- Years active: 1951–1995

Shōgo Shimada (島田 正吾, Shimada Shōgo) (December 13, 1905 – January 26, 2004) was a Japanese film actor.

== Filmography ==
Shōgo Shimada appeared in 49 films from 1951 to 1995.

- Natsumatsuri Sandogasa (1951) – Shinzô
- Kunisada Chūji (1954) – Enzô
- Jigoku no kengô Hirate Miki (1954) – Shûsaku Chiba
- Kutsukake Tokijirō (1954) – Kutsukake Tokijirō
- Rokunin no Ansatsusha (1955)
- Osho ichidai (1955) – Irie
- Tôi hitotsu no michi (1960) – Takamori Saigo
- Satan's Sword (1960) – Shimada Toranosuke
- Zatoichi and the Chest of Gold (1964)
- Showa zankyo-den: Ippiki okami (1966)
- Japan's Longest Day (日本のいちばん長い日 Nihon no ichiban nagai hi) (1967) – Lt. General Takeshi Mori – CO 1st Imperial Guards Division
- Yûbue (1967) – Ginzô Tsutsui
- Jinsei-gekijô: Hishakaku to kiratsune (1968)
- Aa, kaigun (1970) – Admiral Isoroku Yamamoto
- Ezo yakata no ketto (1970) – Jirozaemon Ezo
- Hana to namida to honoo (1970) – Seijuro Fujihana
- Tora! Tora! Tora! (1970) – Ambassador Kichisaburō Nomura
- Nihon Chinbotsu (Tidal Wave) (1973) – Watari (Political Fixer)
- Karafuto 1945 Summer Hyosetsu no Mon (1974)
- Mount Hakkoda (1977) – General Tomoda
- Blue Christmas (1978)
- Nogiku no Haka ("The Wild Daisy") (1981)
- The Challenge (1982) – Toru Yoshida's Father
- Kai (1985) – Daizo Moriyama
- Tokyo: The Last Megalopolis (1988) – Arata Mekata
- Tales of a Golden Geisha (1990) – Zenbu Okura
- The Setting Sun (Rakuyô) (1992)
- Tora-san's Matchmaker (1993) – Zenemon Tamiya
- Tenshu monogatari (1995) – Oumi-no-jou Touroku (final film role)

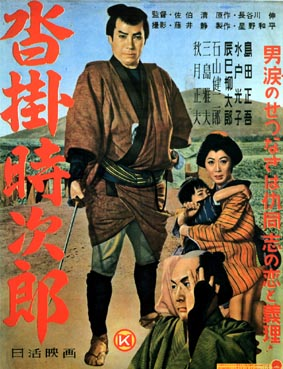
Shōgo Shimada as Kutsukake Tokijirō in Kutsukake Tokijirō (1954).
