= Sweet Home (1989 film) =

1989 Japanese horror film

- Theatrical release poster

Japanese name
- Kanji: スウィートホーム
Transcriptions
- Revised Hepburn: Suwīto hōmu
- Directed by: Kiyoshi Kurosawa
- Written by: Kiyoshi Kurosawa
- Produced by: Juzo Itami; Shogo Hosoya
- Starring: Shingo Yamashiro; Nokko; Ichiro Furutachi; Nobuko Miyamoto; Fukumi Kuroda
- Cinematography: Yonezo Maeda
- Edited by: Akira Suzuki
- Music by: Masaya Matsuura
- Production company: Itami Productions
- Distributed by: Toho
- Release date: 21 January 1989 (Japan)
- Running time: 101 minutes
- Country: Japan
- Language: Japanese

Sweet Home (Japanese: スウィートホーム, Hepburn: Suwīto Hōmu), also known as The Mamiya House, is a 1989 Japanese supernatural horror film written and directed by Kiyoshi Kurosawa and produced by Juzo Itami. It was released alongside a video game, Sweet Home, that inspired the Resident Evil game series released by Capcom. Special makeup effects in the film were done by Dick Smith.

== Plot ==
A small film crew visits the old, abandoned mansion of famous artist Ichirō Mamiya, who left several precious frescos inside his house. The team wants to restore and publish the paintings and film a documentary about Mamiya and his arts. The team includes Kazuo, his daughter Emi, producer Akiko, photographer Taguchi, and art restorer Asuka. After they enter the mansion, paranormal events indicate the presence of a poltergeist. Soon, Asuka is possessed by the infuriated ghost of Lady Mamiya, Ichirō's wife. The team discovers a makeshift grave where a toddler is buried. The boy is Ichirō and Lady Mamiya's son, who fell into the house's incinerator and burned alive. Since then, Lady Mamiya's ghost haunts the mansion, killing any trespassers. In the end, only Kazuo, Emi, and Akiko survive, by reuniting Mamiya with her beloved son, and so giving them peace. When Kazuo, Emi, and Akiko leave the mansion, it begins to collapse.

== Cast ==
- Kazuo Hoshino (星野 和夫, Hoshino Kazuo) (Shingo Yamashiro)
  - Producer. A firm and friendly guy, but anxious and jumpy. Throughout the movie, his affections for Akiko are apparent, but he does not reveal his feelings to her. Kazuo is always worried about his daughter Emi.
- Emi Hoshino (星野 エミ, Hoshino Emi) (Nokko)
  - Daughter of Kazuo. She lost her mother Mrs. Hoshino when she was a toddler and sees Akiko as a "big sister". Emi is a student on summer vacation. She assists her father Kazuo as a guide instead of staying at home alone. Near end of the movie, she is kidnapped by the evil ghost of Lady Mamiya and is rescued by Akiko.
- Ryō Taguchi (田口 亮, Taguchi Ryō) (Ichiro Furutachi)
  - Photographer of the crew. He is a womaniser and stalks Asuka. When Asuka is lured away by Mamiya, he follows her. After being fried in half by the mansion's shadows, he is bludgeoned to death by panicked Asuka as he weakly pleads for help.
- Akiko Hayakawa (早川 秋子, Hayakawa Akiko) (Nobuko Miyamoto)
  - Director of the crew. She is an extremely self-confident woman with the strongest personality of the crew and the final say. She seems to be aware of Kazuo's feelings for her, but pretends to be oblivious. She is the primary heroine of the movie and saves Emi from Lady Mamiya by pretending to be Emi's dead mother.
- Asuka (アスカ) (Fukumi Kuroda)
  - Reporter. She is also a professional art restorer and therefore responsible for the preservation of the sought-out frescos. Her goal is to get famous from the documentary about Ichirō Mamiya and his paintings. She becomes briefly possessed by Lady Mamiya's ghost, threatening the group; the possession leaves her traumatized. After killing Taguchi in a panic after the shadows crippled him, she is overcome with emotion and does not notice a falling battle axe (which Taguchi found and foolishly brought inside) that is seized by the shadows and allowed to fall straight into her forehead, killing her instantly. Her body is then burned and melted along with the chair she fell onto upon death, reduced to a molten mass with the axe still impaled at the top.
- Ichirō Mamiya (間宮 一郎, Mamiya Ichirō)
  - A famous artist who disappeared 30 years ago in his mansion. No one knows what exactly happened to him, but his death is likely connected to the suicide of his beloved wife.
- Lady Mamiya (間宮夫人, Mamiya Fujin) (Machiko Watanabe)
  - Beloved wife of Ichirō. 30 years ago, she lost her son in an accident which also left her severely disfigured. After the toddler's death and the loss of her beauty, Mamiya could not cope with the loss and became insane from shattering all of the mirrors in the house to keep from seeing her now ugly visage to gaining the idea of giving her lost son playmates in her madness. In attempts to do so, she kidnapped and killed toddlers by burning them in the incinerator. When caught red-handed by local villagers, who immediately pursue her, she commits suicide by throwing herself into the very furnace her son died in and met the same end as her victims. Her infuriated soul is trapped in the house due to a magical memorial outside of the house. It seems that Mamiya is upset about the circumstances concerning the close proximity of her memorial and her son's grave.

== Release and lawsuit ==
Sweet Home was distributed in Japan by Toho on 21 January 1989. Following its theatrical run, producer Juzo Itami (who also appears in the movie) took the decision to re-shoot and re-edit parts of the film for the home video and TV releases. Kurosawa was infuriated with Itami's decision to alter the film and, in a move that was unprecedented in the Japanese industry at the time, sued Itami and Itami Productions. Kurosawa lost the lawsuit and Itami Productions was able to distribute the re-edited film. As a result, the film has since been described as "more Itami's film than Kurosawa's", and the original theatrical version remains unavailable. This original 1989 release on VHS and LaserDisc is the only release of the film to-date.

== Reception ==
Tom Mes of Midnight Eye noted that the script echoed Robert Wise's The Haunting. In a 2001 review, he said: "Despite its unsurprising plotting, Sweet Home is action-packed, thrill-packed and effects-packed, resulting in a more than entertaining haunted house ride". In the 2005 book The Midnight Eye Guide to New Japanese Film, Mes and Jasper Sharp wrote of the film: "[It] looks nothing like the deliberately paced, gloomy, cerebral chillers Kurosawa is known for today. Sweet Home takes almost the opposite approach to the genre, resulting in a colorful, action-packed, special effects-laden rollercoaster horror movie". They described the film as "first and foremost an exercise in genre, one with which the cinephile director consciously trod in the footsteps of men like Wise and [Tobe] Hooper".

== Video game ==
A horror role-playing video game of the same name, produced by Juzo Itami and published by Capcom, was released the year the film premiered. According to the game's director, Tokuro Fujiwara, he was able to view the film and use what he wanted to as part of the game and also "carefully considered how to go about bringing elements from the movie to the game screen". In turn, the Sweet Home video game became the basis for the Resident Evil franchise. In its early stages, Fujiwara, who worked on both projects, saw Resident Evil as a spiritual successor to Sweet Home, reusing and improving upon aspects of the earlier game's design.

== See also ==
- House – Another Japanese haunted house movie also made by Toho
