= The Setting Sun (film) =

1992 film

Rakuyô
- Japanese theatrical poster
- Directed by: Rou Tomono
- Written by: Duane Dell'Amico
- Based on: The Setting Sun by Rou Tomono
- Produced by: Masao Wakamatsu
- Starring: Masaya Kato; Diane Lane; Yuen Biao; Donald Sutherland
- Cinematography: Yoshihiro Yamazaki
- Edited by: Osamu Inoue
- Music by: Maurice Jarre
- Production companies: Central Pictures Corporation; China Film Co-Production Corporation
- Distributed by: Nikkatsu
- Release date: 15 September 1992
- Running time: 150 minutes
- Countries: Taiwan; China; Japan
- Languages: Japanese; English
- Box office: HK$2,662,446 (Hong Kong)

The Setting Sun (Japanese: 落陽, Hepburn: Rakuyou) is a 1992 historical drama film directed by Rou Tomono, based on his novel of the same name. It stars Masaya Kato, Diane Lane, Yuen Biao, and Donald Sutherland.

The film was a Taiwanese-Chinese-Japanese co-production.

== Cast ==
- Keishi Arashi - Isihara Kanji
- Shinsuke Ashida - President of Mantetsu
- Tomoko Hoshino - Miyama Mieko
- Masaya Kato - Kaya Tatsuma
- Tamio Kawaji
- Arthur Kuroda - Kouhei
- Diane Lane - Cho Renko
- Haruo Mizuno - Yamashita
- Hideo Murota - Yamami Gou
- Baijaku Nakamura - Mamiya Seijirou
- Umenosuke Nakamura - Ryu Souji
- Akemi Negishi - Yamashita's wife
- Akira Nishikino - Domon
- Jiro Okazaki - Tanaka
- Shōgo Shimada
- Jo Shishido
- Donald Sutherland - John Williams
- Takahiro Tamura - Yamashiro
- Danshi Tatekawa - Aozora-dokoya
- Biao Yuen - Tougetsu
