= Rokunin no Ansatsusha =

Rokunin no Ansatsusha 六人の暗殺者
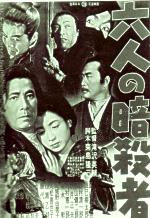
- Japanese movie poster
- Directed by: Eisuke Takizawa
- Written by: Ryūzō Kikushima (writer)
- Produced by: Nikkatsu; Hiroshi Sano (producer)
- Starring: Shōgo Shimada; Osamu Takizawa; Isao Yamagata; Kunitaro Sawamura
- Cinematography: Harumi Fujii
- Music by: Masaru Sato
- Distributed by: Nikkatsu
- Release date: June 5, 1955 (Japan)
- Running time: 107 minutes
- Country: Japan
- Language: Japanese

Rokunin no Ansatsusha (Japanese: 六人の暗殺者) is a 1955 black-and-white Japanese film drama directed by Eisuke Takizawa.

The film won 1956 Blue Ribbon Awards for best screenplay by Ryūzō Kikushima.

== Cast ==
- Shōgo Shimada
- Osamu Takizawa
- Isao Yamagata
- Kunitaro Sawamura
