= Totsugu hi made =

1940 Japanese film

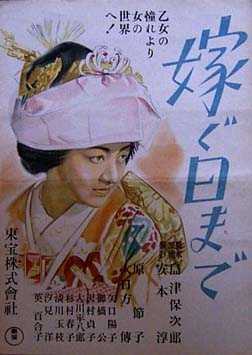
- Theatrical release poster
- Directed by: Yasujirō Shimazu
- Written by: Yasujirō Shimazu
- Produced by: Yasujirō Shimazu
- Starring: Setsuko Hara; Yōko Yaguchi; Kō Mihashi; Sadako Sawamura
- Cinematography: Jun Yasumoto
- Edited by: Zenshū Koizumi
- Music by: Yūji Taniguchi
- Production company: Toho
- Distributed by: Toho
- Release date: 20 March 1940 (Japan)
- Running time: 71 minutes
- Country: Japan
- Language: Japanese

Totsugu hi made (Japanese: 嫁ぐ日まで; lit. Until the Wedding Day) is a 1940 Japanese drama and romance film directed by Yasujirō Shimazu.

== Cast ==
- Setsuko Hara as Yoshiko
- Yōko Yaguchi as Asako
- Sadako Sawamura as Maki Tsuneko
- Kō Mihashi as Mitsuzou
- Haruko Sugimura as Marukawa
- Hiroshi Shiomi as Kizō Okumura
