= The Ramen Girl =

2008 romantic comedy-drama film by Robert Allan Ackerman

- British theatrical release poster
- Directed by: Robert Allan Ackerman
- Screenplay by: Becca Topol
- Produced by: Robert Allan Ackerman; Stewart Hall; Kimio Kataoka; Brittany Murphy; Yoko Narahashi
- Starring: Brittany Murphy; Sohee Park; Toshiyuki Nishida; Tammy Blanchard; Kimiko Yo; Renji Ishibashi
- Cinematography: Yoshitaka Sakamoto
- Edited by: Rick Shaine
- Music by: Carlo Siliotto
- Production companies: Media 8 Entertainment; Digital Site Corporation
- Distributed by: Image Entertainment (United States); Warner Bros. Pictures (Japan)
- Release dates: October 23, 2008 (Russia); May 26, 2009 (United States; DVD)
- Running time: 102 minutes
- Countries: United States; Japan
- Languages: English; Japanese
- Budget: $3.2 million

The Ramen Girl (ラーメンガール, Rāmengāru) is a 2008 romantic comedy-drama film starring Brittany Murphy about a girl who travels to Japan and decides to learn how to cook ramen. Murphy also co-produced.

== Plot ==
Abby, an American, has moved to Tokyo to be with her boyfriend Ethan, and meets British expatriate Charlie and American hostess Gretchen. Ethan breaks up with her before leaving for Osaka, and a heartbroken Abby visits a nearby ramen shop run by chef Maezumi and his wife Reiko, who do not speak English. Abby does not understand Japanese, but the chef kindly brings her a bowl of ramen. Loving the meal, she hallucinates the shop's maneki-neko beckoning to her, and Maezumi and Reiko refuse to let her pay.

The next day, Abby returns to the shop, where she and another patron break into uncontrollable giggles as they eat. Coming back the following day, she insists on helping an injured Reiko serve customers. When the night is through, Maezumi and Reiko find Abby asleep in the back and shoo her out, but she realizes she wants to learn the art of ramen. Rushing back, she begs Maezumi to teach her, and he reluctantly agrees. He treats her harshly, hoping she will quit, but she perseveres and charms the customers as the shop's new waitress.

After her constant voicemails for Ethan go unanswered, Abby enjoys a rare night off with Charlie and Gretchen, and strikes up a connection with Toshi Iwamoto. The chaotic Gretchen comes to stay with Abby, who bonds with Toshi over the unexpected directions their lives have taken, and he and Abby enjoy a date at the Shin-Yokohama Ramen Museum. When Maezumi's rival Udagawa brags that a Grand Master chef will soon determine if his son is worthy of carrying on the family ramen tradition, Maezumi drunkenly declares that Abby will be tested as well.

Fed up with Maezumi's treatment, Abby questions him about the collection of letters and photos she has seen him cry over. He storms off, and Reiko explains that the mail is from their son Shintaro, a chef in Paris, whom Maezumi has not spoken to in five years since he left for France. Toshi reveals his job is sending him to Shanghai for the next three years, and asks Abby to come with him, but she chooses to stay.

Insisting that Abby's cooking has no soul, Maezumi brings her to his mother, who tells her, in Japanese, that she must cook from the heart; Abby confesses that she has been unlucky in love, leaving only pain, and Maezumi's mother suggests putting her tears in her ramen. Abby prepares her broth while crying, and serves it to a table of regular customers, inspiring tearful reactions from everyone who tastes it, including Maezumi.

The Grand Master arrives, and after a few sparing bites of the ramen prepared by Udagawa's son, gives him his blessing. At Maezumi's shop, the Master heartily enjoys Abby's unconventional "Goddess Ramen", but tells her that she needs more time and restraint and he cannot give his blessing. Disappointed after almost a year of training, Abby commiserates with Maezumi, who tells her that he felt he would never have a successor after his son chose to study French cuisine instead. Deciding to close his shop after forty-five years, he declares that she is his true successor.

Abby soon leaves for America, as the entire neighborhood bids her goodbye, and Maezumi gives her the lantern that hung outside his shop. A year later, Toshi has quit his job to pursue his passion for writing music, and reunites with Abby at her own ramen shop in New York City, "The Ramen Girl", with a framed photo of Maezumi and Reiko happily visiting their son in Paris, and the lantern hanging outside.

== Cast ==
- Brittany Murphy as Abby, the main protagonist
- Toshiyuki Nishida as Maezumi, Abby's Sensei, and the ramen chef
- Sohee Park as Toshi Iwamoto, Abby's friend
- Daniel Evans as Charlie, Abby's British friend
- Tammy Blanchard as Gretchen, Abby's 'Southern' friend
- Kimiko Yo as Reiko, Maezumi's wife
- Tsutomu Yamazaki as Grand Master
- Renji Ishibashi as Udagawa
- Gabriel Mann as Ethan, Abby's boyfriend and later ex-boyfriend
- Masayoshi Haneda as Yuki

== Reception ==
Film critic Don Willmott describes The Ramen Girl as "a vacuous but atmospheric analysis of the redemptive power of a good bowl of noodles" in which "The Karate Kid meets Tampopo meets Babette's Feast."

David Cornelius of DVD Talk was more positive, writing that the film "ends with a wonderful homage to Tampopo", and calling it "lovely and sweet".

A more negative response came from Slant Magazine, which ran a highly critical "live-blog review" of the film’s DVD release.
