= Farewell to the Ark =

1984 film

- DVD cover
- Directed by: Shūji Terayama
- Written by: Rio Kishida; Shūji Terayama
- Produced by: Kyoko Kujo
- Starring: Tsutomu Yamazaki; Mayumi Ogawa; Yoshio Harada
- Cinematography: Tatsuo Suzuki
- Edited by: Sachiko Yamaji
- Music by: J. A. Seazer
- Production company: Art Theatre Guild
- Release date: 8 September 1984 (Japan)
- Running time: 127 minutes
- Country: Japan
- Language: Japanese

Farewell to the Ark (Japanese: さらば箱舟, Hepburn: Saraba hakobune) is a 1984 Japanese mystery film directed by Shūji Terayama, loosely based on the novel One Hundred Years of Solitude. It was entered into the 1985 Cannes Film Festival.

== Cast ==
- Tsutomu Yamazaki as Sutekichi Tokito
- Mayumi Ogawa as Sue Tokito
- Yoshio Harada as Daisaki Tokito
- Yôko Takahashi as Temari
- Eisei Amamoto as Key maker
- Renji Ishibashi as Yonetaro Tokito
- Hosei Komatsu
- Seiji Miyaguchi as Old man
- Keiko Niitaka as Tsubana
- Hitomi Takahashi as Chigusa
- Takeshi Wakamatsu as Dai
