= Tsutomu Yamazaki =

Japanese actor

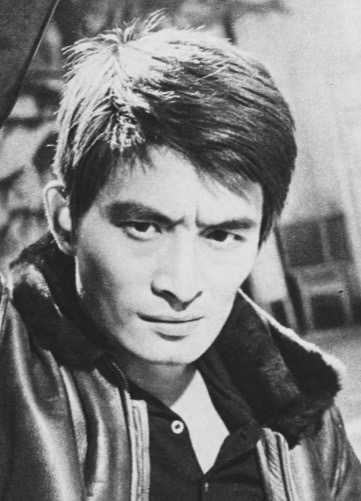
- "Movie Pictorial (Eiga Joho)", December 1963 issue.
- Born: Matsudo, Chiba, Japan
- Occupation: Actor
- Years active: 1960–present
- Spouse: Hikaru Mayuzumi (m. 1963)

Tsutomu Yamazaki (山崎 努, Yamazaki Tsutomu) is a Japanese actor. He won the Blue Ribbon Award for Best Actor in 1984 for The Funeral and Farewell to the Ark. Yamazaki is known for his roles as Goro in Tampopo (1985) and Nenbutsu no Tetsu on the television jidaigeki Hissatsu Shiokinin and Shin Hissatsu Shiokinin.

== Career ==
Yamazaki graduated from Haiyuza Theatre Company and joined Bungakuza in 1959. He made his film debut in Kihachi Okamoto's Daigaku no sanzôkutachi in 1960. In 1961, he received the Elan d'or Award for Newcomer of the Year. In 1963, he appeared in Akira Kurosawa's High and Low. He worked with Kurosawa twice more: in the director's next film, 1965's Red Beard, then fifteen years later, in Kagemusha.

In 1973, he appeared jidaigeki television drama Hissatsu Shiokinin and he played the same role in Shin Hissatsu Shiokinin again in 1977. He also starred in number of Juzo Itami's films, including his role as a trucker who resembles John Wayne in Tampopo (1985). He co-starred in The Ramen Girl (2008) with Brittany Murphy.

He also played a supporting role in Yōjirō Takita's Departures.

== Filmography ==
=== Film ===
| Year | Title | Role | Notes | Ref. |
|---|---|---|---|---|
| 1963 | High and Low | Ginjirō Takeuchi | | |
| 1963 | A Woman's Story | Kohei Shimizu | | |
| 1965 | Red Beard | Sahachi | | |
| 1969 | Tora-san's Cherished Mother | | | |
| 1970 | Fuji sanchō | Takeshi Ishizuka | | |
| 1975 | New Battles Without Honor and Humanity: The Boss's Head | Tetsuya Kusunoki | | |
| 1979 | Demon Pond | | | |
| 1979 | Aftermath of Battles Without Honor and Humanity | Shingo Takagi | | |
| 1980 | Kagemusha | Takeda Nobukado | | |
| 1982 | Dotonbori River | | | |
| 1984 | The Funeral | | Lead role | |
| 1985 | Farewell to the Ark | | Lead role | |
| 1985 | Tampopo | Gorō | Lead role | |
| 1987 | A Taxing Woman | Hideki Gondō | | |
| 1989 | Rikyu | Toyotomi Hideyoshi | | |
| 1993 | We Are Not Alone | | | |
| 1993 | Samurai Kids | | Lead role | |
| 1998 | A Quiet Life | Father | | |
| 1998 | Wait and See | | | |
| 2001 | The Guys from Paradise | Katsuaki Yoshida | | |
| 2001 | Go | Hideyoshi | | |
| 2002 | Doing Time | | Lead role | |
| 2002 | Copycat Killer | | | |
| 2003 | The Thirteen Steps | | | |
| 2004 | Crying Out Love in the Center of the World | | | |
| 2004 | Blooming Again | | Lead role | |
| 2005 | What the Snow Brings | Tamba | | |
| 2006 | Kurosagi | | | |
| 2006 | Crickets | | | |
| 2007 | Dolphine Blue | | | |
| 2008 | Departures | Sasaki | | |
| 2008 | Climber's High | Shirakawa | | |
| 2008 | The Ramen Girl | | American–Japanese film | |
| 2009 | Kamui Gaiden | Narrator | | |
| 2010 | Space Battleship Yamato | Capt Jūzō Okita | | |
| 2011 | The Woodsman and the Rain | | | |
| 2011 | The Wings of the Kirin | Takamasa Kaga | Special appearance | |
| 2012 | Hayabusa: The Long Voyage Home | | | |
| 2013 | Shield of Straw | | | |
| 2013 | Miracle Apples | | | |
| 2014 | As the Gods Will | Shirokuma | Voice role | |
| 2015 | The Emperor in August | Kantarō Suzuki | | |
| 2015 | Kakekomi | Takizawa Bakin | | |
| 2016 | The Actor | Kotō | | |
| 2016 | The Magnificent Nine | | | |
| 2017 | Blade of the Immortal | Kensui Ibane | | |
| 2017 | Mumon: The Land of Stealth | Narrator | | |
| 2018 | The Crimes That Bind | Takamasa Kaga | | |
| 2018 | Killing For The Prosecution | Yūma Shirakawa | | |
| 2018 | Mori, The Artist's Habitat | Morikazu "Mori" Kumagai | Lead role | |
| 2019 | A Long Goodbye | Shōhei | | |
| 2026 | The Honest Realtor: The Movie | | | |

=== TV dramas ===
| Year | Title | Role | Notes | Ref. |
|---|---|---|---|---|
| 1967 | Sanshimai | Kingoro Aoe/Shinichiro Kosugi | Taiga drama | |
| 1972 | Shin Heike Monogatari | Tairano Tokitada | Taiga drama | |
| 1972 | Okappiki Dobu | Okappiki Dobu | Lead role | |
| 1972 | Nemuri Kyōshirō | Okappiki Dobu | Episode17 | |
| 1973 | Hissatsu Shiokinin | Nenbutsu no Tetsu | Lead role, Hissatsu series | |
| 1976-77 | Hissatsu Karakurinin Kepuuhen | Dozaemon | Lead role, Hissatsu series | |
| 1978 | Shin Hissatsu Shiokinin | Nenbutsu no Tetsu | Hissatsu series | |
| 1995 | Kumokiri Nizaemon | Kumokiri Nizaemon | Lead role | |
| 1995 | The Abe Clan | Abe Yaichi'emon | TV movie | |
| 1998 | Seikimatsu no Uta/The Last Song | Prof. Natsuo Momose | | |
| 2001 | Gokenin Zankurō | | Episode 10 | |
| 2006 | Kurosagi | Katsuragi Toshio | | |
| 2014 | Roosevelt Game | Takeshi Aoshima | | |
| 2014 | Leaders | Isokichi Ōshima | Mini-Series | |
| 2018 | As a Father of Murderer Son | Katsuhiko Yoshinaga | TV movie | |
| 2022 | The Honest Realtor | | | |

== Awards and honours ==
| Year | Award | Category | Work(s) | Result | Ref. |
|---|---|---|---|---|---|
| 1961 | 6th Elan d'or Awards | Newcomer of the Year | Himself | Won | |
| 1980 | 3rd Japan Academy Film Prize | Best Supporting Actor | Yashagaike | Nominated | |
| 1980 | 5th Hochi Film Award | Best Supporting Actor | Kagemusha | Won | |
| 1981 | 54th Kinema Junpo Awards | Best Supporting Actor | Kagemusha | Won | |
| 1985 | 8th Japan Academy Film Prize | Best Actor | The Funeral, Farewell to the Ark | Won | |
| 1985 | 58th Kinema Junpo Awards | Best Actor | The Funeral, Farewell to the Ark | Won | |
| 1985 | 27th Blue Ribbon Awards | Best Actor | The Funeral, Farewell to the Ark | Won | |
| 1985 | 39th Mainichi Film Awards | Best Actor | The Funeral, Farewell to the Ark | Won | |
| 1990 | 13th Japan Academy Film Prize | Best Supporting Actor | Rikyu, Harimau, The Dancing Girl | Nominated | |
| 1994 | 17th Japan Academy Film Prize | Best Supporting Actor | We Are Not Alone | Nominated | |
| 2001 | 14th Nikkan Sports Film Award | Best Supporting Actor | Go | Won | |
| 2001 | 26th Hochi Film Award | Best Supporting Actor | Go, The Guys from Paradise, Jogakusei no Tomo | Won | |
| 2002 | 75th Kinema Junpo Awards | Best Supporting Actor | Go, The Guys from Paradise, Jogakusei no Tomo | Won | |
| 2002 | 23rd Yokohama Film Festival | Best Supporting Actor | Go, The Guys from Paradise, Jogakusei no Tomo, Go Heat Man! | Won | |
| 2002 | 25th Japan Academy Film Prize | Best Supporting Actor | Go | Won | |
| 2002 | 44th Blue Ribbon Awards | Best Supporting Actor | Go | Won | |
| 2003 | 26th Japan Academy Film Prize | Best Supporting Actor | Copycat Killer | Nominated | |
| 2009 | 32nd Japan Academy Film Prize | Best Supporting Actor | Departures | Won | |
| 2009 | 18th Tokyo Sports Film Award | Best Supporting Actor | Departures, Climber's High | Won | |
| 2019 | 73rd Mainichi Film Awards | Mori, The Artist's Habitat | Best Actor | Nominated | |
| 2019 | 28th Tokyo Sports Film Award | Mori, The Artist's Habitat | Best Actor | Nominated | |
| 2022 | 45th Japan Academy Film Prize | Distinguished Service Award | Himself | Won | |

| Year | Honor | Ref. |
|---|---|---|
| 2000 | Medal with Purple Ribbon | |
| 2008 | Order of the Rising Sun, 4th Class, Gold Rays with Rosette | |
