= The Guys from Paradise =

2000 Japanese film

- Directed by: Takashi Miike
- Written by: Itaru Era; Izō Hashimoto
- Based on: Tengoku Kara Kita Otoko-tachi by Yōji Hayashi
- Starring: Koji Kikkawa; Nene Otsuka; Kenichi Endō; Tsutomu Yamazaki
- Cinematography: Hideo Yamamoto
- Edited by: Yasushi Shimamura
- Music by: Koji Kikkawa; Tomoyuki Konishi
- Distributed by: Nikkatsu and Hammers
- Release dates: October 30, 2000 (Tokyo International Film Festival); June 16, 2001 (Japan)
- Running time: 114 minutes
- Countries: Japan; Philippines
- Languages: Japanese; Filipno; Tagalog; English

The Guys from Paradise (天国から来た男たち, Tengoku Kara Kita Otoko-tachi) is a 2000 Japanese-Filipino crime film directed by Takashi Miike, adapted from the novel by Yōji Hayashi.

== Plot ==
Japanese businessman Kohei Hayasake of Sanyu Trading is arrested for possession of a kilo of heroin in Manila and sent to a prison there. Umino, a restaurant owner in Manila, introduces Kohei to Yoshida, a former member of the criminal underworld who has chosen to be imprisoned in order to escape from his enemies, who hires Kohei to be his business representative in exchange for permission to use Yoshida's private toilet. Yoshida bribes the guards to let him take Kohei to a hotel to purchase a kilo of heroin but Kohei uses the opportunity to escape and runs to the hotel where his wife is staying but finds that she did not return to the hotel the previous night. Yoshida finds Kohei and insists that he will kill him if Kohei betrays him again.

Yoshida sells the drugs through the warden, who states that Kohei must produce money for bribes in order to win his case. The pedophile Sakamoto takes Kohei to a club where he is drugged and taken to a room to have his organs removed for sale but Yoshida finds him and rescues him. Kohei leaves his wife after determining that she is sleeping with the company's lawyer. At his trial, Kohei is sentenced to life in prison.

During the next drug deal, Kohei is attacked by members of Yoshida's old yakuza clan, who state that Yoshida's real name is Murakame. Kohei escapes and is driven back to the prison by Brando, a prisoner who once had a legal dispute with Kohei's company. Yoshida's assistant Belila is shot dead by an attacking gunman while she is stabbing him to death.

When the poor inmates gang up against the privileged Japanese inmates working with Yoshida, Brando distracts them by throwing money on the ground, allowing the Japanese men to escape. As they are escaping they stop to help an injured woman. They take her to her village, where Sakamoto treats her as well as the numerous ill children of the village. Taro, an unfulfilled comic book artist who meditates and speaks to himself all day, is worshiped as a god by the villagers.

The yakuza Yabumoto who is chasing Murakame arrives in the village and kills Sakamoto then points his gun at Kohei before Murakame arrives to surrender himself. Convicted embezzler Namie Mishima from the women's wing of the prison offers Yabumoto gemstones worth millions, throwing them at him as Kohei pulls a gun from the back of her shorts and kills Yabumoto. The yakuza fire on Kohei and Namie but Umino jumps in front of them and saves their lives.

Murakame decides to return to prison, while Taro stays in the village. Using the pseudonym Mabini, Kohei wins the Philippine presidential election, hoping to turn around the economy and the country for the sake of the people.

== Cast ==
- Koji Kikkawa as Kōhei Hayakawa
- Nene Otsuka as Namie Mishima
- Kenichi Endō as Toshiyuki Umino
- Kazuhiko Kanayama as Kōji Sugimori
- Toshiyuki Kitami as Tadashi Yabumoto
- Kenji Mizuhashi as Philippines Tarō
- Mai Oikawa as Miyuki Hayasaka (Kōhei's wife)
- Hua Rong Weng as Jun Sakamoto
- Mitsuhiro Oikawa as Kashiwagi
- Naoto Takenaka as a mysterious man
- Tsutomu Yamazaki as Katsuaki Yoshida

== Release ==
The film premiered at the 13th Tokyo International Film Festival on October 30, 2000.

== Reception ==
Jonathan Crow of AllMovie gave a positive review and said that "Though not one of this best works, Guys from Paradise is definitely worth a look."
