= Daibyonin =

- Directed by: Juzo Itami
- Written by: Juzo Itami
- Starring: Rentarō Mikuni; Masahiko Tsugawa; Nobuko Miyamoto
- Music by: Toshiyuki Honda
- Production company: Itami Productions
- Distributed by: Toho
- Release date: 1993
- Running time: 116 minutes
- Country: Japan
- Language: Japanese

Daibyonin (大病人, Daibyōnin; literally 'patient in serious condition'), also known as The Last Dance and more rarely The Seriously Ill, is a 1993 Japanese film directed by Juzo Itami about the final year of a successful film director suffering from cancer.

The film can be seen as a criticism of the traditional attitudes of Japanese doctors to their patients, especially the withholding of information from patients with terminal illnesses, which Itami saw as "a violation of human rights". It also touches on other end-of-life issues for the terminally ill, and how Japanese society deals with both life and death.

The film's cast includes Rentarō Mikuni (Buhei Mukai, the film director), Masahiko Tsugawa (Doctor Ogata) and Nobuko Miyamoto (Buhei's wife). Mikuni was nominated for Best Actor at the 1994 Japanese Academy Awards for his role in both Daibyonin and Tsuribaka nisshi 6.

== Plot ==
Buhei Mukai is a successful actor and film director, and is making a film about a middle aged married couple, both of whom are dying of cancer.

After he vomits blood when he is with his mistress, Buhei's wife takes him to the hospital, where the doctor diagnoses him with terminal cancer and operates on his stomach. However, he withholds this information from Buhei, and tells him he has an ulcer.

After a remission, Buhei again becomes ill, is operated on for a second time, and is confined to hospital. Gradually he guesses that he must be suffering from cancer, despite constant reassurances to the contrary from his wife and doctor.

After a suicide attempt, the doctor and wife decide to tell him the truth. After wrestling with his conscience, Dr. Ogata also allows Buhei to direct the final scene of his film, even though the effort will shorten his life, and agrees not to administer drugs that would prolong his life at the cost of more pain and suffering.

Buhei completes his film. He tells the doctor how grateful he is that he was honest about his condition and could live his final weeks to the full. In the last scene, he dies, surrounded by his wife, doctor, nurse and members of the film production crew.
