= Tampopo =

1985 film by Jūzō Itami

- Theatrical re-release poster
- Directed by: Juzo Itami
- Screenplay by: Juzo Itami
- Produced by: Juzo Itami; Yasushi Tamaoki; Seigo Hosogoe
- Starring: Tsutomu Yamazaki; Nobuko Miyamoto; Kōji Yakusho; Ken Watanabe; Rikiya Yasuoka
- Cinematography: Masaki Tamura
- Edited by: Akira Suzuki
- Music by: Kunihiko Murai
- Production companies: Itami Productions; New Century Producers
- Distributed by: Toho
- Release date: November 23, 1985 (Japan)
- Running time: 115 minutes
- Country: Japan
- Language: Japanese

Tampopo (タンポポ, Tanpopo; literally "dandelion") is a 1985 Japanese comedy film written and directed by Juzo Itami, and starring Tsutomu Yamazaki, Nobuko Miyamoto, Kōji Yakusho, and Ken Watanabe. The publicity for the film calls it the first "ramen Western", a play on the term spaghetti Western.

== Plot ==
A pair of truck drivers, Gorō and his younger colleague Gun, stop at a nondescript roadside ramen noodle shop. Outside, Gorō rescues a boy who is being beaten by three schoolmates. The boy, Tabo, is the son of Tampopo, the widowed owner of the struggling ramen shop, Lai Lai. Inside, a customer called Pisuken harasses Tampopo, demanding that she sell the shop. Gorō suggests Pisuken be quiet so he can enjoy his meal, then provokes a physical confrontation. Gorō puts up a good fight but, outnumbered by Pisuken and his men, he is knocked out and awakens the next morning in Tampopo's home.

The next morning, she cooks breakfast for Gorō and Gun in her home kitchen and sends Tabo off to school. While eating breakfast, Tampopo asks for their opinion of her ramen, Gorō and Gun tell her it is "sincere, but lacks character." After Gorō gives her some advice, she asks him to become her teacher. They decide to turn her establishment into a paragon of the "art of noodle soup making". She and Gorō visit her competitors and he points out their strengths and weaknesses. Still struggling to perfect the broth, Gorō takes her to a homeless encampment to enlist the "old master". When they rescue a wealthy elderly man from choking on his food, the man lends her the services of his chauffeur Shohei, who has a masterly way with noodles. Gun and his friends give Tampopo a makeover as a modern proprietress. During the transition, the group agrees to change the restaurant's name from "Lai Lai" to "Tampopo".

Unrelated vignettes of other characters are also intercut within the main storyline:

- The film opens with "Man in White Suit" visiting a movie theater and breaking the fourth wall by addressing the viewing audience, warning them to keep quiet during the movie.
- A "ramen noodle master" teaches his apprentice the proper traditional method for eating ramen noodle soup.
- A group of business executives visit a French restaurant, but have no idea how to order and are upstaged by a surprisingly worldly subordinate.
- A women's etiquette class on how to eat spaghetti silently in the European manner abruptly changes course upon observing a white man slurping his noodles.
- A gentleman has a rotten tooth extracted, then eats ice cream afterwards, sharing with a young child whose mother forbids him to eat sweets.
- A supermarket clerk catches an aged woman obsessed with squeezing food.
- A con man uses an elaborate meal to lure a victim into an investment scam; the victim is himself a thief but is so taken by the meal that he fails to leave with the con man's wallet before being arrested.
- The Man in White Suit and a teenage girl share an intimate kiss as she feeds him a fresh oyster from her palm.
- A housewife rises from her deathbed to cook one last meal for her family, who mournfully eat to memorialize her.
- The Man in White Suit and his lover explore erotic ways to use food. Later in the film during a separate vignette, the man is ultimately shot several times by an unknown assailant, to his mistress's horror, though he is satisfied at the end of his life and hopes to see it play out like a film.
- A woman on a park bench breastfeeds an infant.

== Cast ==
- Tsutomu Yamazaki as Gorō
- Nobuko Miyamoto as Tampopo
- Kōji Yakusho as Man in White Suit
- Ken Watanabe as Gun
- Rikiya Yasuoka as Pisuken
- Kinzō Sakura as Shōhei
- Yoshi Katō as Noodle-making master
- Hideji Ōtaki as Rich Old Man
- Fukumi Kuroda as Man in White Suit's mistress
- Setsuko Shinoi as Old Man's mistress
- Yoriko Dōguchi as Pearl diver (Oyster girl)
- Masahiko Tsugawa as Supermarket manager
- Yoshihiro Katō as Man in White Suit's henchman
- Mariko Okada as Spaghetti sensei
- Ryūtarō Ōtomo as Ramen master
- Toshiya Fujita as Man with Toothache (un-credited)

== Production ==
Following the success of The Funeral, Itami began writing Tampopo immediately after, drawing inspiration from Luis Buñuel's The Phantom of Liberty, and American westerns, Sergio Leone in particular. He then infused it with his own observations of ramen culture and its ability to democratize Japanese society, a subject he briefly explored in The Funeral.

Itami produced the film himself along with his wife and frequent collaborator, Nobuko Miyamoto, whom he cast in the titular role. By producing the property himself, it allowed him to quickly develop the script, begin principal photography, and release the film by November 1985.

Filming for Tampopo primarily took place in Shibaura, Tokyo, then an industrial working class neighborhood built on reclaimed land just off Tokyo's Inner Circular Route, the main throughfare truck drivers use to get around greater Tokyo. Although the main restaurant interior was built on a stage, the restaurant exterior and road driven by Goro and Gun in their truck was filmed on Old Kaigan Road just off the Takahama bridge. Much of the film was shot at real locations with natural lighting in the cinéma vérité style by cinematographer Masaki Tamura, who created a vibrant portrayal of the 80s pre-bubble Tokyo before the development boom during which much of Shibaura's working class charm and the film's locations would disappear.

Due to the lack of major studio support, Itami relied on many non-professional local residents as talent, and the use of low tech equipment and jury rigged solutions to problems. Food Stylist Seiko Ogawa was hired not only to make bowl after perfect bowl of ramen, but also to serve as Miyamoto's ramen coach, and to act as the crew's caterer. In another vignette, a homeless man sneaks into a restaurant to cook Tampopo's son's omurice. The Nihonbashi restaurant Taimeiken's kitchen was used as the filming location, featuring then chef-owner Masaaki Modegi's unique inside-out style of omelette (Modegi also served as the hand model for the cooking close-up scenes), which has now become a popular way of serving omurice in Asia due in part to its popularity garnered from the film.

== Release ==
Tampopo was released by Toho in Japan on November 23, 1985, where it received a modest box office, but initially found difficulty finding international distribution as it failed to meet The Funeral's popularity. It premiered internationally at the 1986 Toronto International Film Festival where it was well received by international critics and was picked up by New Yorker Films for US release in 1987, and has since become a cult classic.

The Criterion Collection prepared a 4K restoration of Tampopo that was released in theaters and via Blu-ray in October 2016, and featured in several academic retrospectives.

== Reception ==
=== Critical response ===
Roger Ebert gave the film four out of four stars, commenting that "Like the French comedies of Jacques Tati, it's a bemused meditation on human nature in which one humorous situation flows into another offhandedly, as if life were a series of smiles."

Hal Hinson of The Washington Post wrote, "The movie, which Itami calls a 'noodle Western,' is a rambunctious mixture of the bawdy and the sublime...Tampopo is perhaps the funniest movie about the connection between food and sex ever made."

Andrew Johnston writing in Time Out New York commented: "This film is his broadest comedy by far, and its principal subjects are those great global constants, food and sex. That, combined with the plot's sly evocation of movie Westerns, made it widely accessible to foreign audiences."

Vincent Canby provided a somewhat dissenting, though still positive, opinion in his New York Times review, stating, "Though it's not consistently funny... Tampopo is one of the more engaging films to be shown in this year's [New Directors/New Films] series... Mr. Itami often strains after comic effects that remain elusive. The most appealing thing about Tampopo is that he never stops trying."

Tampopo has received unanimous praise from critics, with a 100% approval rating and average score of 8.5/10 from Rotten Tomatoes, based on 57 reviews. The site's critical consensus states, "Thanks to director Juzo Itami's offbeat humor and sharp satirical edge, Tampopo is a funny, sexy, affectionate celebration of food and its broad influence on Japanese culture."

=== Accolades ===
Tampopo received two Japanese Academy Awards: Akira Suzuki for Best Editing, and Fumio Hashimoto for Best Sound. In the United States, it was nominated for an Independent Spirit Award for Best Foreign Film, and a National Society of Film Critics Award for Best Screenplay and Best Director.

== Legacy ==
Tampopo has influenced many famous chefs including legendary chef and food writer Alice Waters, who has made the film required viewing for her kitchen staff, and her protégés Jerry Jaksich, Sam White, and Rayneil De Guzman who have not only made pilgrimages to Japan as a result, but opened their own ramen shop in 2013 as well.

Chef Ivan Orkin of Ivan Ramen also credits Tampopo as an inspiration for becoming a chef, as well as helping popularize ramen as more than just food for poor students in America.

Many film critics point to Tampopo as the originator of food porn. The film is also notable for dealing with food and sexuality together, a theme found in later films such as Like Water for Chocolate (1992), Chocolat (2000) and The Taste of Things (2024).

The 2008 American/Japanese movie The Ramen Girl, in which a girl played by Brittany Murphy learns how to cook ramen, contains many references to Tampopo, including a cameo by Tsutomu Yamazaki.

A number of ramen restaurants around the world have been named Tampopo, while the inside-out style of omelette featured in the film has become popular due to its dynamic presentation that lends itself to sharing on social media.
