= Ghost Stories of Wanderer at Honjo =

Ghost Stories of Wanderer at Honjo 怪談本所七不思議 Kaidan Honjo Nanafushigi
- Directed by: Goro Katono
- Written by: Otoya Hayashi; Nagayoshi Akasada
- Produced by: Shintoho
- Starring: Juzaburo Akechi; Shigeru Amachi; Hiroshi Hayashi
- Cinematography: Hiroshi Suzuki
- Distributed by: Shintoho
- Release date: July 10, 1957
- Running time: 55 minutes
- Country: Japan
- Language: Japanese

Ghost Stories of Wanderer at Honjo (怪談本所七不思議, Kaidan Honjo Nanafushigi) (a.k.a. Seven Mysteries) is a 1957 black-and-white, full screen Japanese film directed by Goro Katono. It is Japanese horror film (J-Horror) based on the story Seven Wonders of Honjo (本所七不思議, Honjo Nanafushigi) by Akira Sugawa. It was never dubbed in English, nor shown in the United States. The Japanese title translates as Ghost Story of the Seven Wonders of Honjo.

== Cast ==
- Juzaburo Akechi
- Shigeru Amachi
- Hiroshi Hayashi
- Uraji Matsuura
- Akiko Tamashita
- Michiko Tachibana

== See also ==
- Seven Wonders of Honjo (本所七不思議)
