= Juzo Itami =

Japanese actor, screenwriter, and film director (1933–1997)

- 伊丹 十三
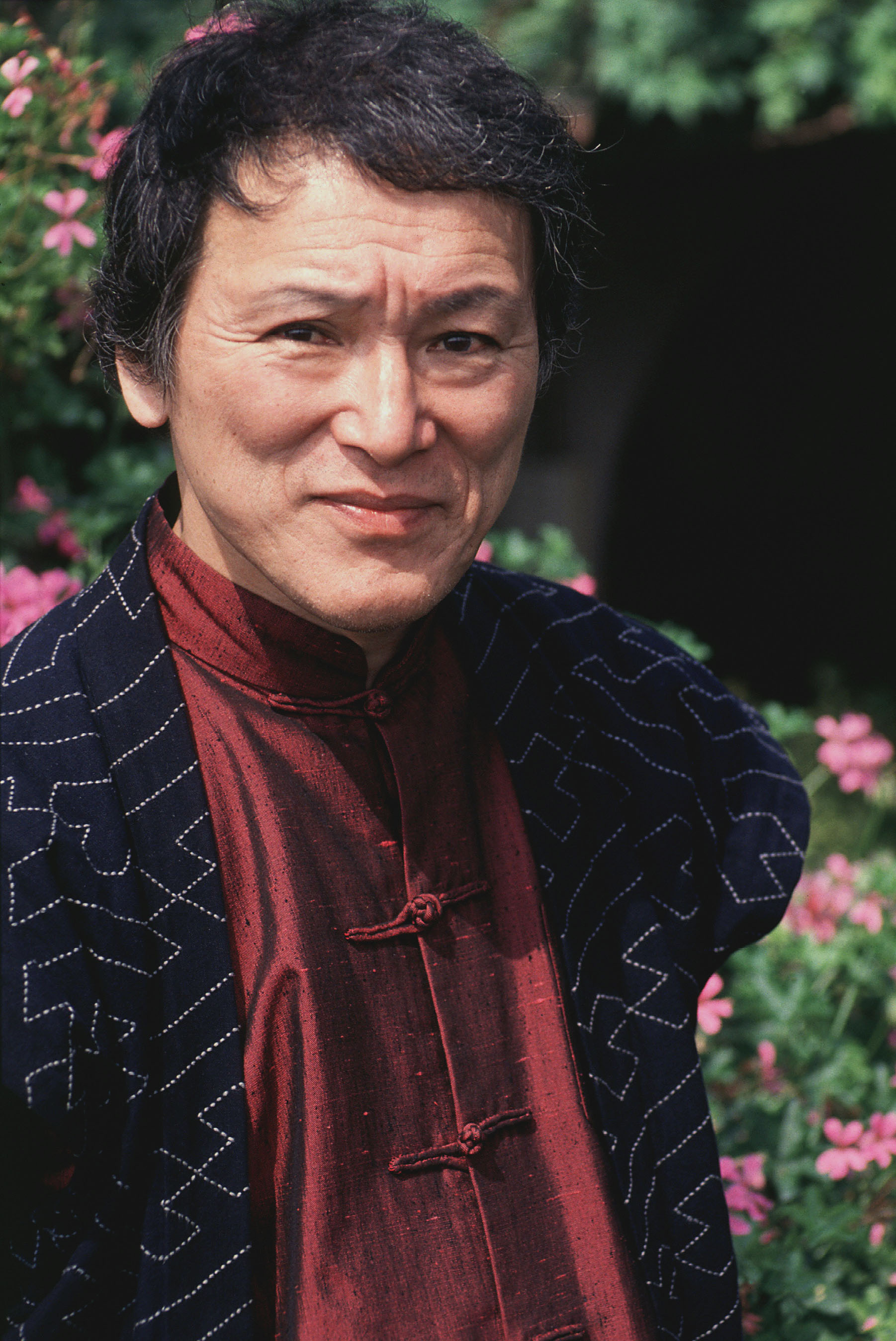
- Itami in 1992
- Born: Yoshihiro Ikeuchi (池内 義弘); May 15, 1933; Kyoto, Japan
- Died: December 20, 1997 (aged 64); Tokyo, Japan
- Occupations: Film director; screenwriter; actor
- Years active: 1960–1997
- Spouse: Kazuko Kawakita (m. 1960; div. 1966) Nobuko Miyamoto (m. 1969)
- Children: Mansaku Ikeuchi (son)
- Father: Mansaku Itami
- Relatives: Hikari Ōe (nephew)

Juzo Itami (伊丹 十三, Itami Jūzō), born Yoshihiro Ikeuchi (池内 義弘, Ikeuchi Yoshihiro; May 15, 1933 – December 20, 1997), was a Japanese actor, screenwriter and film director. He directed eleven films (one short and ten features), all of which he wrote himself.

He is the namesake of the Juzo Itami Award, founded in 2009 to honor his legacy.

== Early life ==
Itami was born Yoshihiro Ikeuchi in Kyoto. The name Itami was passed on from his father, Mansaku Itami, a renowned satirist and film director before World War II. In his childhood, he went by the name Takehiko Ikeuchi (池内 岳彦).

At the end of the war, in Kyoto, Itami was chosen as a prodigy and educated in a Tokubetsu Kagaku Gakkyū ("special scientific education class"), where he began to be trained as a future scientist who was expected to defeat the Allied powers. Among his fellow students were the sons of Hideki Yukawa and Sin-Itiro Tomonaga. The program was abolished in March 1947.

He moved from Kyoto to Ehime Prefecture when he was a high school student. He attended the prestigious Matsuyama Higashi High School, where he was known for being able to read works by Arthur Rimbaud in French. Due to his poor academic record, he had to remain in the same class for two years; it was here that he became acquainted with Kenzaburō Ōe, who later married his sister.

When he was unable to graduate from Matsuyama Higashi High School, he transferred to Matsuyama Minami High School and graduated thereafter. After failing the entrance exam for the College of Engineering at Osaka University, Itami worked at times as a commercial designer and writer, illustrator, television reporter, and essayist. He was also the editor-in-chief for the 1980s psychoanalytic magazine Mon Oncle.

In his early acting days, Itami lived in London. By the time he became a director, he spoke English near-flawlessly, although preferred to use an interpreter during interviews.

Itami was the brother-in-law of Kenzaburō Ōe and an uncle of Hikari Ōe.

== Acting career ==
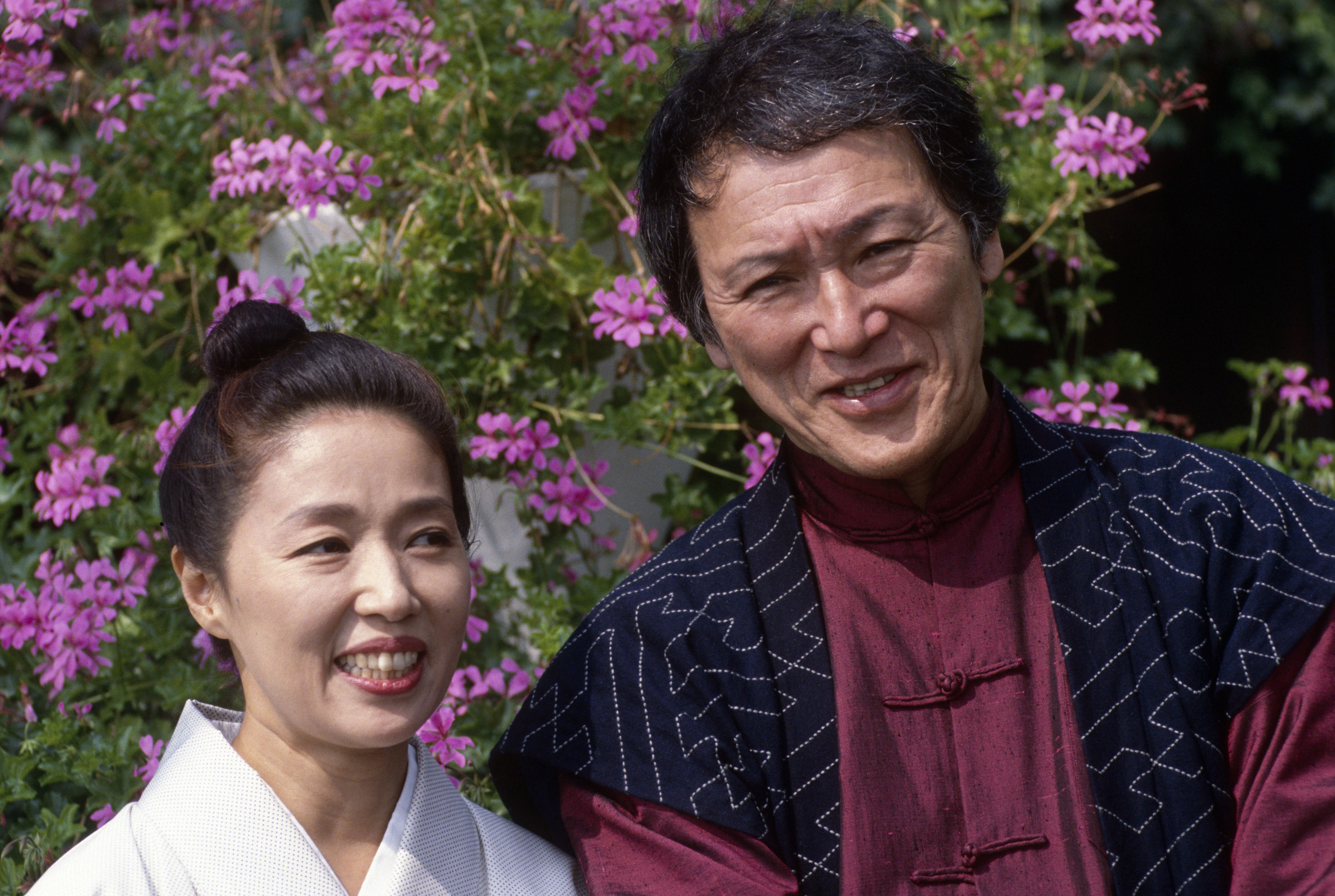
Itami and Miyamoto in 1992

Itami studied acting at a drama school called Butai Geijutsu Gakuin in Tokyo. In January 1960 he joined Daiei Film, where president Masaichi Nagata gave him the stage name Itami Ichizō (伊丹 一三), the surname from his father and the given name from industrialist Ichizō Kobayashi. In May 1960, Itami married Kazuko Kawakita, the daughter of film producer Nagamasa Kawakita. He first acted on screen in Ginza no Dora-neko (1960). The following year, he left Daiei and started to appear in foreign-language films such as 55 Days at Peking.

In 1965, Itami appeared in the big-budget Anglo-American film Lord Jim, and also published a book of essays which became a hit, titled Yōroppa Taikutsu Nikki (ヨーロッパ退屈日記; "Diary of Boredom in Europe"). In 1966, he and Kawakita agreed to divorce.

Itami met and co-starred with actress Nobuko Miyamoto in the 1965–66 NHK TV drama Ashita no Kazoku, and the two again acted alongside each other on the set of the 1967 film Sing a Song of Sex. He and Miyamoto married in 1969 and had two sons in the following years.

In April 1967, he changed his stage name to "伊丹 十三" (Itami Jūzō) – with the kanji "十" (ten) rather than "一" (one), and with 十三 meaning "thirteen" – with the meaning of "changing a minus into a plus".

In 1968 he played Saburo Ishihara, the father of Takeshi and Koji during the second season of the children's series Cometto-san. He became well known for this role in many Spanish-speaking countries, along with Yumiko Kokonoe who played the lead role.

In the 1970s, he joined the television production company TV Man Union, working as a producer of and presenter on television documentaries, which influenced his later career as a film director. He also worked as a reporter for a TV program called Afternoon Show.

In 1983, Itami played the father in both Yoshimitsu Morita's The Family Game and in Kon Ichikawa's The Makioka Sisters, roles for which he won the Hochi Film Award and Best Supporting Actor at the Yokohama Film Festival respectively.

Along with his acting career, he translated several English books into Japanese, including Papa, You're Crazy by William Saroyan, The Kitchen Sink Papers: My Life as a Househusband by Mike McGrady, and The Potato Book by Myrna Davis and Truman Capote.

== Director ==
Itami's debut as director was the movie The Funeral (Osōshiki) in 1984, at the age of 51. This film proved popular in Japan and won many awards, including Japanese Academy Awards for Best Picture, Best Director, and Best Screenplay. However, it was his second movie, the 1985 comedy film, or self-described "noodle western" Tampopo, that earned him international exposure and acclaim.

His following film A Taxing Woman (1987) was again highly successful. It won six major Japanese Academy awards and spawned a sequel A Taxing Woman's Return in 1988. The central character, played by his wife Nobuko Miyamoto who appeared in all his films, became a pop culture heroine. This was followed by his fifth film A-Ge-Man: Tales of a Golden Geisha.

Itami directed the anti-yakuza satire Minbo: the Gentle Art of Japanese Extortion as his sixth feature. On May 22, 1992, six days after the release of the film, Itami was attacked, beaten, and slashed on the face by five members of the Goto-gumi, a Shizuoka-based yakuza clan, who were angry at Itami's film's portrayal of gang members. In an interview with the New York Times, he described the attack, saying, "They cut very slowly; they took their time. They could have killed me if they wanted." This attack led to a government crackdown on the yakuza.

His subsequent stay in a hospital inspired his next film Daibyonin (1993), a grim satire on the Japanese health system. During a showing of this film in Japan, a cinema screen was slashed by a right-wing protester.

Before his death, he directed another three films: A Quiet Life (based on the Kenzaburō Ōe novel), Supermarket Woman, and Woman in Witness Protection.

=== Recurring cast members ===
Itami frequently re-cast actors whom he had worked with on previous films.

Recurring cast members in Juzo Itami's works
Actor Work	Nobuko Miyamoto	Masahiko Tsugawa	Chōei Takahashi	Yoshihiro Katō	Hideji Ōtaki	Noboru Mitani	Tsutomu Yamazaki	Akio Tanaka	Takehiro Murata	Yasuo Daichi	Shirō Itō	Akira Takarada	Kinzō Sakura	Haruna Takase	Mansaku Fuwa	Nobuto Okamoto	Mihoko Shibata	Tetsu Watanabe	Koichi Ueda	Yoriko Doguchi
The Funeral																				
Tampopo																				
A Taxing Woman																				
A Taxing Woman's Return																				
Tales of a Golden Geisha																				
Minbo																				
The Last Dance																				
Shizuka na Seikatsu																				
Supermarket Woman																				
Marutai no Onna																				

== Death ==
Itami died on December 20, 1997, in Azabudai, Tokyo after falling from the roof of the building where his office and Itami Productions were located. On his desk was found a suicide note written on a word processor stating that he had been falsely accused of an affair and was taking his life to clear his name. Two days later, a tabloid magazine, Flash, published a report of such an affair. A toxicology report also noted that he was intoxicated at the time of his death.

However, no one in Itami's family, including his wife, Nobuko Miyamoto, believed that he would have taken his life, or that he would have been mortally embarrassed by a real or alleged affair. Film director Nagisa Ōshima and rakugo performer Tatekawa Danshi, who knew Itami well, also stated that they believed he would not kill himself for this reason. In addition, as one of Japan's leading lettering designers – his handwritten typefaces were given the nickname "Itami Mincho" for being so precise – some felt Itami's computer-typed suicide note to be incongruous with his love of handwritten design. Despite the official ruling as a suicide, Miyamoto remained under police protection for over a decade following Itami's death.

In 2008, a former member of the Goto-gumi yakuza group told reporter Jake Adelstein: "We set it up to stage his murder as a suicide. We dragged him up to the rooftop and put a gun in his face. We gave him a choice: jump and you might live or stay and we'll blow your face off. He jumped. He didn't live." The attack is thought to have been due to the topic of Itami's next film, which was rumored to have been focusing on connections between the Goto-gumi and the cult-like Soka Gakkai new religious group.

== Tributes ==
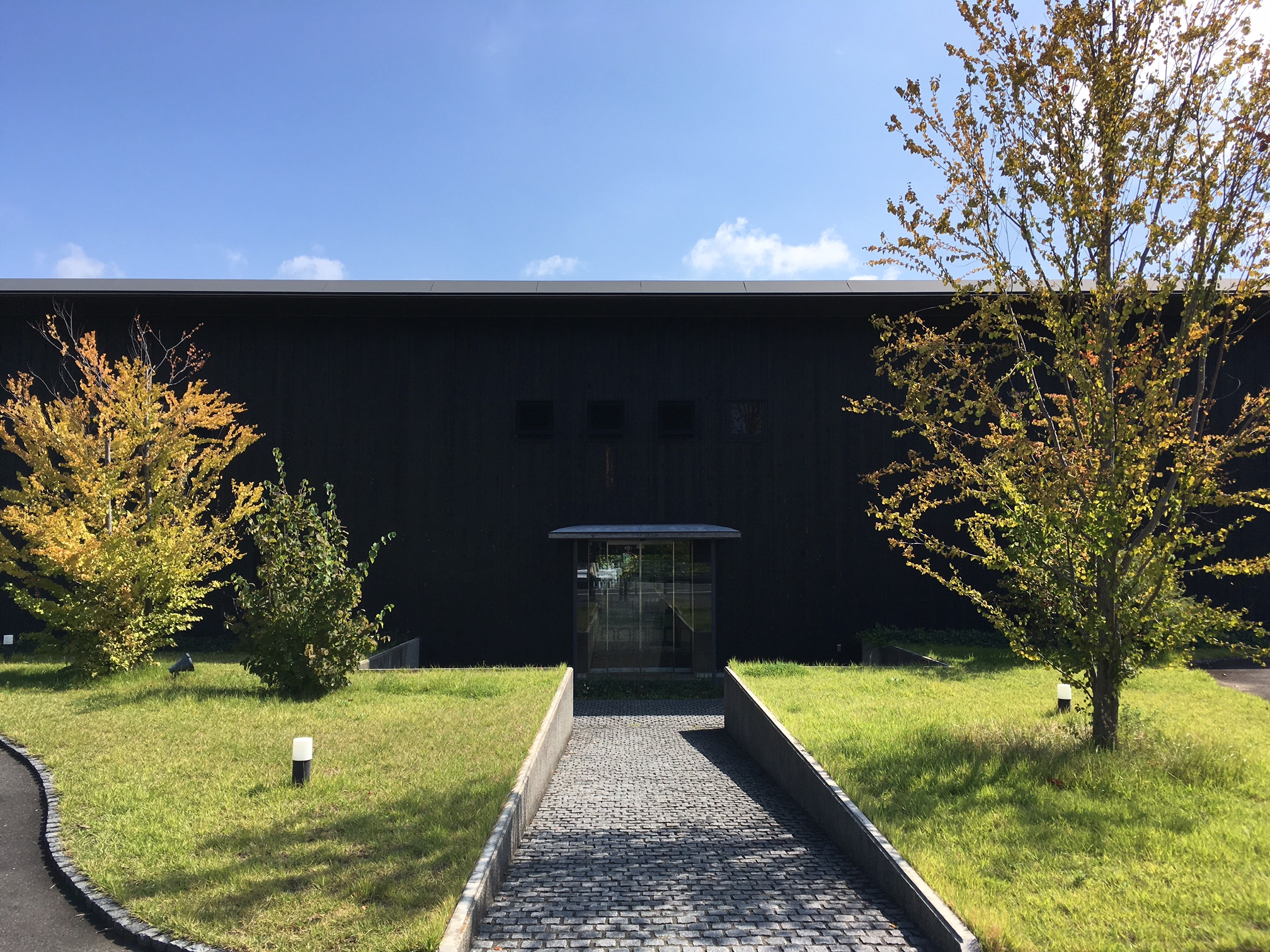
Itami Juzo Museum in Matsuyama, Ehime

Itami's brother-in-law and childhood friend Kenzaburō Ōe wrote The Changeling (2000) based on their relationship.

There is a Juzo Itami memorial museum in Matsuyama, Ehime Prefecture, opened in May 2007 by his wife Nobuko Miyamoto. The museum was designed by architect Yoshifumi Nakamura and features a special exhibition, rotating its displays and theme every few years, a permanent exhibition, divided up into thirteen sections to reflect the "thirteen" meaning of Itami's name, and an outdoor courtyard. It also houses a cafe named "Café Tampopo" after the film.

Itami's films and legacy have long been supported by Yasushi Tamaoki, CEO of Matsuyama-based confectionary company Ichiroku Honpo. Tamaoki invested heavily into Itami's first film, and all subsequent films, with Itami acting in and narrating (in Ehime dialect) commercials for the company's regional specialty "Ichiroku Tart". Tamaoki also served as president of Itami Productions, and is chairman of the ITM Itami Memorial Foundation, which operates the memorial museum and presents the annual Juzo Itami Award.

== Filmography ==
=== As an actor ===
Year	Title	Role	Notes
1960	Ginza no dora-neko		
1961	A False Student	Soratani (as Ichizō Itami)	
1961	Her Brother	Son of Factory Owner	Uncredited
1961	The Big Wave	Toru	
1961	Ten Dark Women	Hanamaki	
1963	Onna no tsuribashi	Saburō Ōki	Episode 2
1963	55 Days at Peking	Col. Shiba	
1964	Shūen	Takuji Yoshii	
1965	Lord Jim	Waris	
1966	By a Man's Face Shall You Know Him	Shunji Amamiya	
1967	Sing a Song of Sex	Ōtake	
1967	Choueki juhachi-nen: kari shutsugoku		
1968	Shōwa genroku Tokyo 196X-nen		
1968	Ah kaiten tokubetsu kogekitai		
1968	Ah, yokaren	Miyamoto	
1969	Kinpeibai	Hsi Men Ching	
1969	Eiko e no 5,000 kiro		
1969	Heat Wave Island	Iino	
1970	Hiko shonen: Wakamono no toride	Ishizaka	
1971	Yasashii Nippon jin		
1973	Kunitori Monogatari	Ashikaga Yoshiaki	TV series
1973	Shinsho Taikōki	Araki Murashige	TV series
1974	Lady Snowblood: Love Song of Vengeance	Ransui Tokunaga	
1974	Imôto	Kazuo Wada	
1974	Waga michi		
1975	Wagahai wa neko de aru	Meitei	
1979	Collections privées		(segment "Kusa-Meikyu")
1979	No More Easy Life	Takamizawa (Landlord)	
1979	Grass Labyrinth	Principal / Priest / Old man	Short
1980	Yūgure made	Sasa	
1981	Slow na boogie ni shitekure	Lawyer	
1981	Shikake-nin Baian	Sahei Oumiya	
1981	Akuryo-To	Ryuhei Ochi	
1982	Kiddonappu burûsu (Kidnap Blues)		
1983	The Makioka Sisters	Tatsuo Makioka, Tsuruko's husband	
1983	The Family Game	Mr. Numata, the father	
1983	Meiso chizu	Itakura	
1983	Izakaya Chōji	Kawara	
1984	Make-up	Kumakura	
1984	MacArthur's Children	Hatano	
1985	The Excitement of the Do-Re-Mi-Fa Girl	Professor Hirayama	
1985	Haru no Hatō	Itō Hirobumi	TV series
1989	Sweet Home	Yamamura	(final film role)

=== As director ===
Year	Title	Notes
1962	Rubber Band Pistol	Short film
1984	The Funeral	
1985	Tampopo	
1987	A Taxing Woman	
1988	A Taxing Woman's Return	
1990	Tales of a Golden Geisha	
1992	Minbo	
1993	The Last Dance	
1995	Shizuka na Seikatsu	"A Quiet Life"
1996	Supermarket Woman	
1997	Marutai no Onna	"Woman in Witness Protection"

== Awards ==
- 1985 Japan Academy Prize for Director of the Year—The Funeral
- 1988 Japan Academy Prize for Director of the Year—A Taxing Woman
