= Hideji Ōtaki =

Japanese actor (1925–2012)

- 大滝 秀治
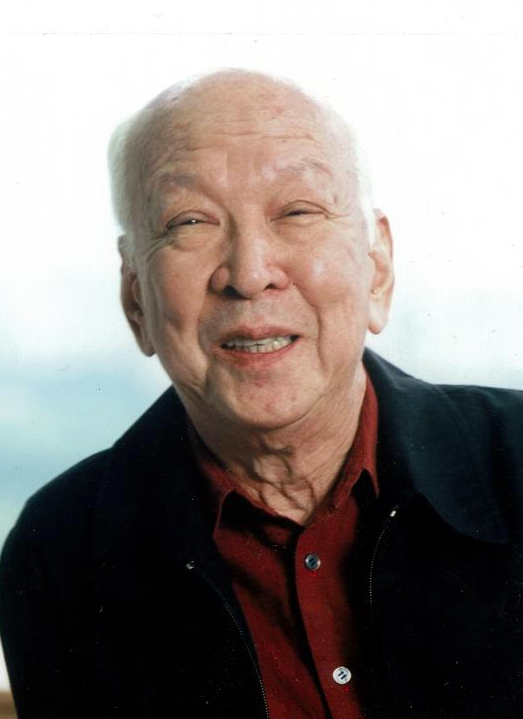
- Born: June 6, 1925; Nakakubiki District, Niigata Prefecture
- Died: October 2, 2012 (aged 87); Tōkyō Metropolis
- Occupations: Actor, businessperson
- Years active: 1950–2012

Hideji Ōtaki (大滝 秀治, Ōtaki Hideji; June 6, 1925 – October 2, 2012) was a Japanese actor. He served as President of the Mingei Theatre Company.

== Career ==
After serving in World War II, he became interested in the theater and helped found the Gekidan Mingei troupe in 1950. He gained fame for his television work from the 1970s, but he also appeared in many films, especially those of Juzo Itami. His last film, Anata e, starring Ken Takakura, was released a few months before his death. He died of lung cancer at his home in Tokyo on 2 October 2012.

== Awards ==
He won the award for Best Supporting Actor at the 1st Hochi Film Award for Brother and Sister, Kimi yo fundo no kawa o watare and Fumō Chitai.

== Selected filmography ==
=== Films ===
- Children of Hiroshima (1952)
- Dobu (1954)
- Black Sun (1964)
- A Chain of Islands (1965)
- A Man′s World (1971)
- Lake of Dracula (1971)
- Karei-naru Ichizoku (1974)
- The Homeless (1974)
- Brother and Sister (1976)
- Manhunt (1976)
- Fumō Chitai (1976)
- Queen Bee (1978)
- Hi no Tori (1978)
- Nichiren (1979)
- The House of Hanging (1979)
- Kagemusha (1980), Yamagata Masakage
- Dotonbori River (1982)
- The Go Masters (1983)
- The Funeral (1984)
- Tampopo (1985)
- Lost in the Wilderness (1986)
- Tokyo Blackout (1987)
- Tokyo: The Last Megalopolis (1988)
- Umi e, See You (1988)
- Tales of a Golden Geisha (1990)
- Childhood Days (1990)
- Minbo (1992)
- Spy Sorge (2003)
- Casshern (2004)
- Memories of Tomorrow (2006)
- The Inugami (2006)
- Dearest (2012)

=== Television ===
- Minamoto no Yoshitsune (1966)
- Mito Kōmon (1973)
- Hissatsu Shiokinin (1973) (ep1 Guest)
- Tsūkai! Kōchiyama Sōshun (1975)
- Tokusō Saizensen (1977-87)
- Shiroi Kyotō (1978)
- Kita no Kuni kara (1981–1992) - Seikichi Kitamura
- Dokuganryū Masamune (1987), Kosai Sōitsu
- Hoshi no Kinka (1995), Shirō Morioka
- Hachidai Shōgun Yoshimune (1995), Tokugawa Mitsusada
- Mōri Motonari (1997), Hanshū
- Sakura (2002), James Takero Matsushita

== Honours ==
- Medal with Purple Ribbon (1988)
- Order of the Rising Sun, 4th Class, Gold Rays with Rosette (1995)
- Person of Cultural Merit (2011)
