= Kutsukake Tokijirō (1954 film) =

Kutsukake Tokijirō 沓掛時次郎
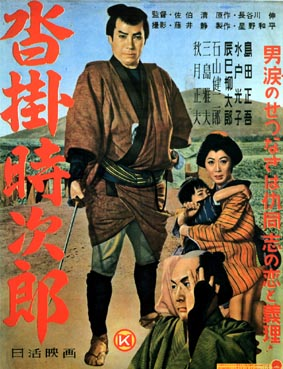
- Japanese movie poster
- Directed by: Kiyoshi Saeki
- Produced by: Nikkatsu
- Starring: Shōgo Shimada
- Distributed by: Nikkatsu
- Release date: July 27, 1954
- Country: Japan
- Language: Japanese

Kutsukake Tokijirō (沓掛時次郎, Kutsukake Tokijirō) is a 1954 black-and-white Japanese film directed by Kiyoshi Saeki and produced by Nikkatsu.

It is one of seven films about Kutsukake Tokijirō.

== Cast ==
- Shōgo Shimada (島田正吾) as Kutsukake Tokijirō
