= A Taxing Woman's Return =

- Directed by: Juzo Itami
- Screenplay by: Juzo Itami
- Produced by: Juzo Itami; Yasushi Tamaoki; Seigo Hosogoe
- Starring: Nobuko Miyamoto; Rentarō Mikuni; Toru Masuoka; Masahiko Tsugawa
- Cinematography: Yonezo Maeda
- Edited by: Akira Suzuki
- Music by: Toshiyuki Honda
- Production company: Itami Production
- Distributed by: Toho
- Release date: 15 January 1988 (Japan)
- Running time: 128 minutes
- Country: Japan

A Taxing Woman's Return (Japanese: マルサの女2, Hepburn: Marusa no onna 2) is a 1988 Japanese comedy film written and directed by Juzo Itami. It is the sequel to Itami's 1987 comedy A Taxing Woman. Nobuko Miyamoto plays female government tax investigator Ryoko Itakura. She investigates a religious sect, led by Teppei Onizawa (Rentarō Mikuni), that is suspected of being used for tax evasion. The sect is part of a complex conspiracy involving the yakuza, political corruption, and a prestigious construction project.

== Release ==
A Taxing Woman's Return was released in Japan on January 15, 1988 where it was distributed by Toho.

== Reception ==
The film won a few Japanese awards. This included the Mainichi Film Concours Best Supporting Actor for Yasuo Daichi (also for Bakayaro! I'm Plenty Mad) and a Japan Academy Award for Best Editing (Akira Suzuki), who won the award for this film in addition to Ikidomari no Banka: Break Out, Love Bites Back, The Silk Road and Umi e, See You.
