= Nobuko Miyamoto =

Japanese actress (born 1945)

- 宮本 信子
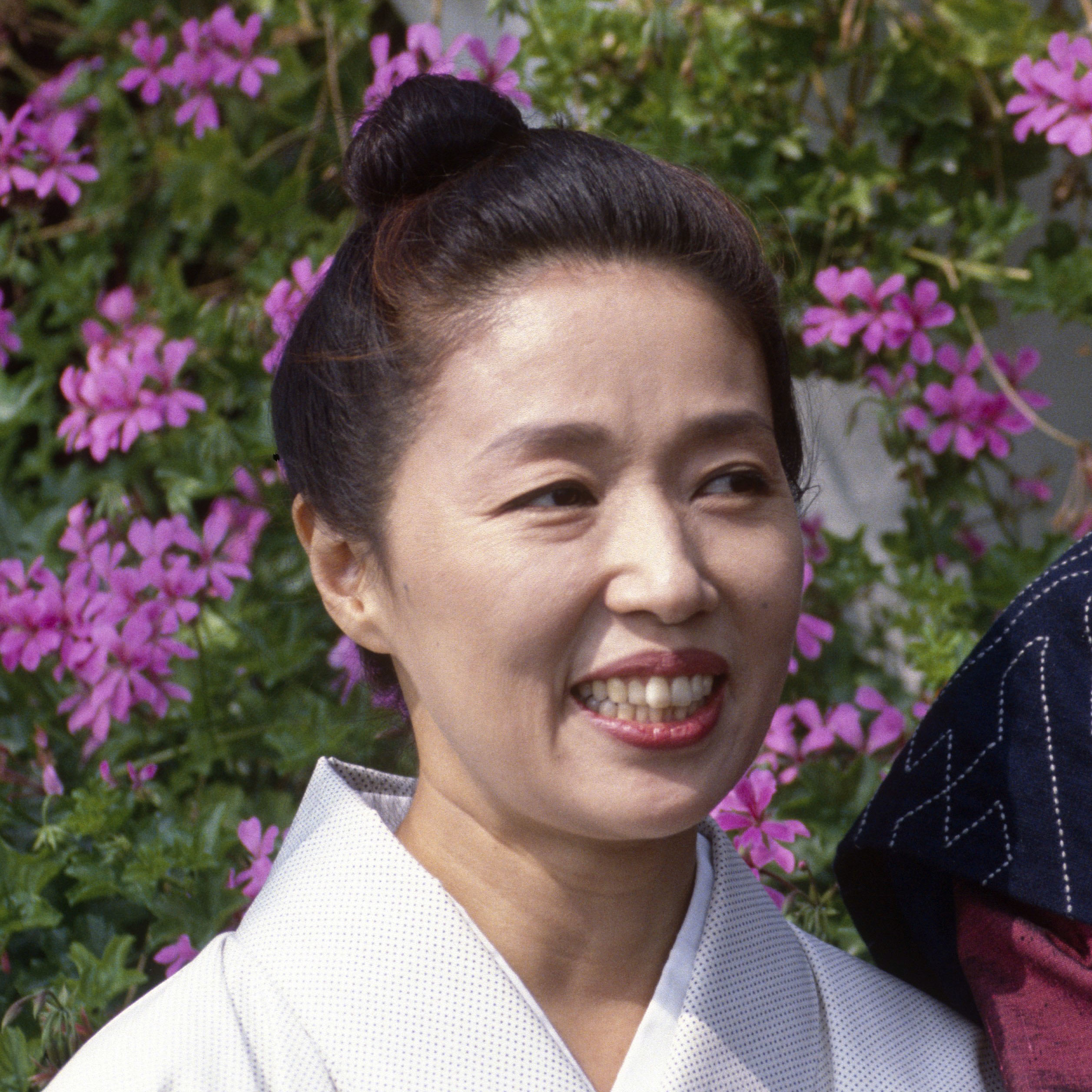
- Miyamoto in 1992
- Born: March 27, 1945 (age 80); Otaru, Hokkaido, Japan
- Occupation: Actress
- Years active: 1966–present
- Spouse: Juzo Itami (m. 1969; died 1997)
- Children: Mansaku Ikeuchi (son)
- Awards: Japan Academy Prize Best Actress; 1988 A Taxing Woman

Nobuko Miyamoto (宮本 信子, Miyamoto Nobuko; born March 27, 1945) is a Japanese actress. She was born in Otaru, Hokkaidō, and raised in Nagoya. She was married to director Juzo Itami from 1969 until his death in 1997, and regularly starred in his films.

She has been nominated for eight Best Actress Japanese Academy Awards, winning in 1988 for her role in A Taxing Woman.

== Selected filmography ==
=== Film ===
- Lost Sex (1966)
- Sing a Song of Sex (1967)
- The Funeral (1984)
- Tampopo (1985)
- A Taxing Woman (1987)
- A Taxing Woman's Return (1988)
- Sweet Home (1989) as Akiko Hayakawa
- A-Ge-Man: Tales of a Golden Geisha (1990)
- Minbo (1992)
- Daibyonin (1993)
- Supermarket Woman (1996)
- Woman in Witness Protection (1997)
- Welcome Back, Mr. McDonald (1997)
- Hankyu Railways: A 15-Minute Miracle (2011) as Tokie Hagiwara
- Isoroku (2011)
- Strawberry Song (2019)
- Stand by Me Doraemon 2 (2020)
- It's a Flickering Life (2021) as Yoshiko
- BL Metamorphosis (2022) as Yuki Ichinoi
- Haw (2022)

=== Television ===
- Uchi no Ko ni Kagitte... (1984)
- Mōri Motonari (1997), Tae
- Manten (2002–03)
- Tenchijin (2009), narrator
- Amachan (2013)
- Botchan (2016)
- Hiyokko (2017), Suzuko
- In This Corner of the World (2018), Ito Morita
- Hiyokko 2 (2019), Suzuko
- House of Ninjas (2024), Taki Tawara

== Honours ==
- Medal with Purple Ribbon (2014)
- Kinuyo Tanaka Award (2022)
- Order of the Rising Sun, 4th Class, Gold Rays with Rosette (2022)
