= Kunitarō Sawamura =

Japanese kabuki and film actor (1905–1974)

- 沢村国太郎
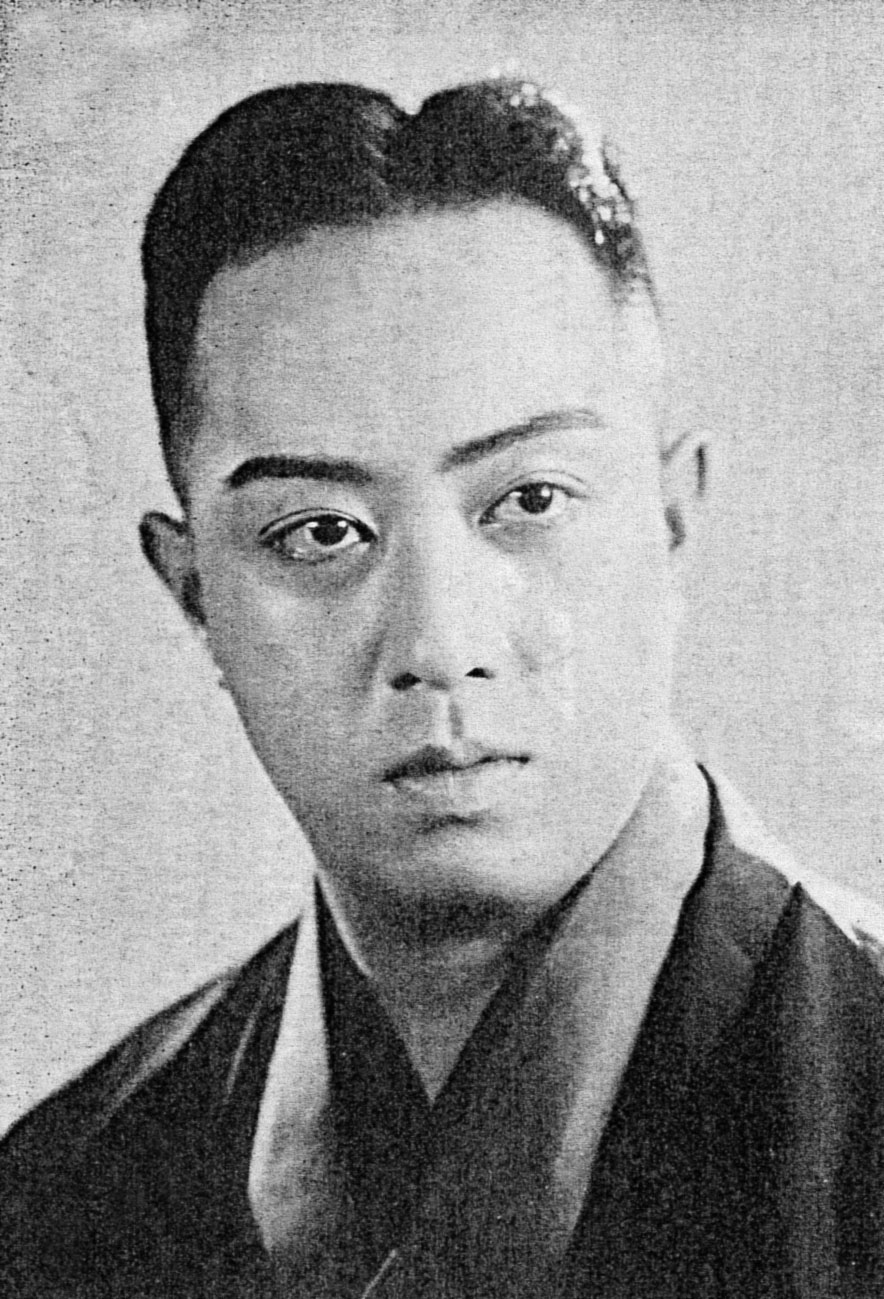
- Kunitarō Sawamura in 1932
- Born: June 1, 1905; Taito-ku, Tokyo, Japan
- Died: November 26, 1974 (aged 69)
- Occupation: Actor
- Spouse: Tomoko Makino
- Children: Hiroyuki Nagato; Masahiko Tsugawa
- Relatives: Sadako Sawamura (sister); Daisuke Katō (brother); Shōzō Makino (father-in-law)

Kunitarō Sawamura (沢村 国太郎, Sawamura Kunitarō; 1 June 1905 – 26 November 1974) was a Japanese kabuki and film actor.

== Career ==
Sawamura, whose original name was Yūichi Katō, was born in Tokyo to the kabuki actor Denzō Takeshiba. He studied acting under Sōjūrō Sawamura VII before taking the stage name Kunitarō Sawamura IV in 1926, appearing mostly as an onnagata. He began his movie career at the film studio Makino Productions in 1929, and later moved to Nikkatsu, working most of the time in jidaigeki. After the war, he mainly worked as a character actor.

== Family ==
Both Sawamura's own family and that of his wife were active in the film industry. Sawamura's younger brother and sister were the actors Daisuke Katō and Sadako Sawamura. He married Tomoko Makino, the daughter of Shozo Makino, a film director and the head of Makino Productions. His brothers in law were thus the film directors Sadatsugu Matsuda (1906–2003), Masahiro Makino (1908–1993), and Shinzō Makino, as well as the producer Mitsuo Makino. Masahiro married the actress Yukiko Todoroki and their son—and thus Sawamura's nephew—Masayuki Makino, is the head of the Okinawa Actor's School. Sawamura fathered the actors Masahiko Tsugawa and Hiroyuki Nagato, both of whom married famous actresses, Yukiji Asaoka and Yōko Minamida respectively.

== Selected filmography ==
- The Million Ryo Pot (1935)
- Gate of Hell (1953)
- Ghost of Saga Mansion (1953)
- Rokunin no ansatsusha (1955)
- Shin Heike Monogatari (1955)
