= Yasuo Daichi =

Japanese actor

- Born: 25 November 1951 (age 74); Kumamoto, Japan
- Occupation: Actor
- Years active: 1979–present

Yasuo Daichi (大地 康雄, Daichi Yasuo; born 25 November 1951) is a Japanese actor. He has appeared in more than 50 films since 1979.

== Selected filmography ==
=== Films ===
Year	Title	Role	Notes	Ref.
1987	A Taxing Woman	Ijūin		
1988	Last Cabaret			
1989	A Sign Days	Yonaha		
1992	Minbo	Suzuki		
2005	Love Tomato		Lead role	
2005	The Samurai I Loved			
2006	Love and Honor			
2016	Kōfuku no Alibi			
2017	Survival Family	Yoshikazu Tanaka		
2017	The Last Recipe			
2019	The 47 Ronin in Debt			
2026	Service Oath			
2027	Senkaku 1945		Special appearance	

=== Television ===
Year	Title	Role	Notes	Ref.
1991	Taiheiki	Isshiki Umanosuke	Taiga drama	
2011	Gō	Shibata Katsuie	Taiga drama	
