= Sadako Sawamura =

Japanese actress (1908–1996)

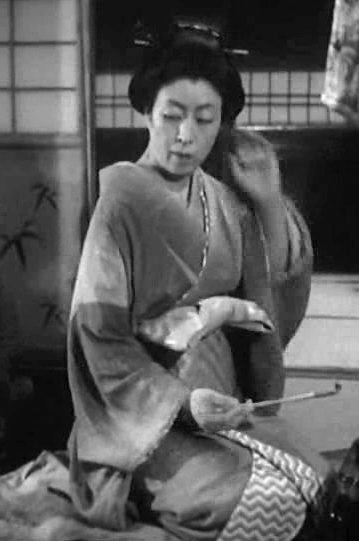
- From The Life of Oharu (1952)
- Born: Sadako Katō; 11 November 1908; Asakusa, Tokyo, Japan
- Died: 16 August 1996 (aged 87)
- Occupation: Actress
- Years active: 1935–1976
- Spouses: Kamatari Fujiwara (m. 1936–1946); Yasuhiko Ohashi (m. ?–1996)
- Relatives: Daisuke Katō and Kunitarō Sawamura (brothers)

Sadako Sawamura (沢村貞子, Sawamura Sadako; 11 November 1908 – 16 August 1996) was a Japanese stage and film actress who appeared in more than 200 films between 1935 and 1976.

== Biography ==
Sawamura was born Sadako Katō in the Asakusa district of Tokyo. After dropping out of Japan Women's University, she was active in left-wing theatre groups and twice arrested. She started acting in films in 1934, first at the Nikkatsu studio, later at Toho. She appeared in many supporting roles after the war, often working with director Mikio Naruse. Other filmmakers Sawamura worked with include Kenji Mizoguchi, Yasujirō Ozu, Keisuke Kinoshita and Kaneto Shindō.

Her brothers were the actors Daisuke Katō and Kunitarō Sawamura. Her autobiography Watashi no Asakusa has been translated into English as My Asakusa. She was married to actor Kamatari Fujiwara and film magazine editor and critic Yasuhiko Ohashi.

== Selected filmography ==
=== Film ===
- Totsugu hi made (1940)
- Dancing Girl (1951)
- The Life of Oharu (1952)
- Epitome (1953)
- Late Chrysanthemums (1954)
- So Young, So Bright (1955)
- Street of Shame (1956)
- The Blue Sky Maiden (1957)
- Late Autumn (1960)
- The Wandering Princess (1960)
- Zero Focus (1961)
- Girls of the Night (1961)
- Chūshingura: Hana no Maki, Yuki no Maki (1962)

=== Television ===
- Shinsho Taikōki (1973), Ōmandokoro
- Sekigahara (1981), Maeda Matsu
