= A-Ge-Man: Tales of a Golden Geisha =

1990 Japanese comedy film by Jūzō Itami

Tales of a Golden Geisha
- Directed by: Juzo Itami
- Screenplay by: Juzo Itami
- Produced by: Seigo Hosogoe; Yasushi Tamaoka; Juzo Itami
- Starring: Nobuko Miyamoto; Masahiko Tsugawa; Hiroshi Okochi; Ryunosuke Kaneda
- Cinematography: Yoshihiro Yamazaki
- Music by: Toshiyuki Honda
- Production companies: Itami Films; Seigo Hosogoe Office
- Distributed by: Toho
- Release date: 2 June 1990 (Japan)
- Running time: 119 minutes
- Country: Japan

Tales of a Golden Geisha (あげまん, Ageman), also known as A-Ge-Man, is a 1990 Japanese comedy film directed and written by Juzo Itami. It stars Nobuko Miyamoto as a geisha who brings good luck to her intimate companions (known as an "ageman", from 上げる ageru 'to raise up') and Masahiko Tsugawa as a man who crosses paths with her by chance.

== Cast ==
- Nobuko Miyamoto as Nayoko
- Masahiko Tsugawa as Mondo Suzuki
- Ryunosuke Kaneda as Tamonin
- Atsuko Ichinomiya as Rin, Tamonin's mother
- Kin Sugai as Foster mother
- Kazuyo Mita as Hiyoko
- Mitsuko Ishii as Eiko
- Yoriko Douguchi as Junko
- Maiko Minami as Sayori-chan
- Fukumi Kuroda as Kiyoka
- Isao Hashizume
- Haruna Takase as Fur shop manager
- Tokuko Sugiyama as Restaurant manager
- Yakan Yanagi as Foster father
- Michiyo Yokoyama as Tamonin's court lady
- Hiroko Seki as Shinkame Chiyo restaurant manager
- Noborou Yano as Hirutaji chief
- Yan Yano as Hirutaji chief
- Harukazu Kitami as Bo-san #1
- Akira Kubo as Bo-san #2
- Yoshihiro Kato as Segawa Kikunojo
- Akari Uchida as Houte couture woman
- Mihoko Shibata as Woman carer in movie
- Mansaku Fuwa as Executioner's assistant in the dream
- Yôichi Ueda as Camera man
- Shinobu Oshizaka as Doctor
- Eijirō Tōno as Prime Minister
- Kiyokata Saruwaka as Traditional dance teacher
- Kazuo Kitamura as Tsurumaru
- Akira Takarada as Inukai
- Shōgo Shimada as Zenbu Okura
- Hideji Ōtaki as Chijiwa (uncredited)
- Hiroshi Okouchi as Chichiiwa

== Release ==
A-Ge-Man: Tales of a Golden Geisha was distributed theatrically in Japan by Toho on 2 June 1990. The film was shown at the Chicago International Film Festival on October 10, 1990 and at the Japan Today Film Festival in Los Angeles on November 1, 1991.

== Reception ==
A-Ge-Man: Tales of a Golden Geisha was nominated for four Japanese Academy Awards—Best Director (Juzo Itami), Best Actress (Nobuko Miyamoto), Best Screenplay (Juzo Itami) and Best Editing (Akira Suzuki).
