= Minbo =

1992 Japanese film by Jūzō Itami

- Directed by: Juzo Itami
- Written by: Juzo Itami
- Produced by: Yasushi Tamaoki
- Starring: Nobuko Miyamoto; Yasuo Daichi; Takehiro Murata
- Cinematography: Yonezo Maeda
- Edited by: Akira Suzuki
- Music by: Toshiyuki Honda
- Distributed by: Toho
- Release date: May 16, 1992
- Running time: 123 minutes
- Country: Japan
- Language: Japanese

Minbo (ミンボーの女, Minbō no Onna) is a 1992 Japanese film by filmmaker Juzo Itami. It is also known by the titles Minbo: the Gentle Art of Japanese Extortion, The Gangster's Moll and The Anti-Extortion Woman. The film was widely popular in Japan and a critical success internationally. It satirizes the yakuza, who retaliated for their portrayal in the film by attacking the director.

== Plot summary ==
The owner of a high-class Japanese hotel, the Europa, hopes to win a prestigious and lucrative contract for the hotel as the site of a summit meeting between important international officials. Unfortunately, the yakuza have taken a liking to this hotel as both a hangout and a target for extortion. In order to win the contract, the owner realizes, he must rid the hotel of the yakuza. Fearing to confront them himself, he deputizes a hotel accountant, Suzuki (Yasuo Daichi) and a bellboy and former college sumo-club member, Wakasugi (Takehiro Murata). The hapless pair are no more daring than their employer, however, and their tentative attempts to address the problem fail until they meet Mahiru Inoue (Nobuko Miyamoto), a lawyer who specializes in dealing with the yakuza. With Inoue's direction, the hotel staff comes together to face down the yakuza ruffians, who are portrayed as craven, outwardly-threatening-but-inwardly-weak, fools.

== Definition of "minbo" ==
The word "minbo" is a contraction of minji kainyū bōryoku (民事介入暴力), literally translated as "violent intervention in civil affairs". It was a technique utilized by the yakuza following the crackdown of traditionally "victimless" crimes of drugs, gambling, and prostitution in the early 1980s, and exploited the Japanese reluctance towards confrontation in order to "gently extort" money from otherwise innocent individuals by making a scene with implied threats of violence over trivial matters.

== Attack against Juzo Itami ==
The yakuza, who prefer to think of themselves as something akin to modern-day samurai, were angered by their portrayal in Minbo as common thugs and bullies. Three knife-wielding members of the Goto-gumi yakuza gang attacked director Juzo Itami near his home on May 22, 1992, six days after the movie opened. Itami was beaten and had his face slashed. The brutality of the attack, combined with Itami's popularity and the success of Minbo, led to a public outcry and a government crackdown against yakuza activity.

== Cast ==
- Nobuko Miyamoto as Mahiru Inoue
- Yasuo Daichi as Suzuki the accountant
- Takehiro Murata as Wakasugi the bellboy
- Akira Takarada as Kobayashi the general manager
- Hosei Komatsu as Hanaoka
- Noboru Mitani as the yakuza boss
- Gorō Mutsumi
- Akira Nakao
- Shirō Itō as Iriuchi
- Hideji Otaki as the hotel owner
