= The Funeral (1984 film) =

1984 film by Jūzō Itami

- DVD cover
- Directed by: Juzo Itami
- Written by: Juzo Itami
- Produced by: Seigo Hosogoe
- Starring: Tsutomu Yamazaki; Nobuko Miyamoto; Kin Sugai; Asao Sano; Hideji Ōtaki
- Cinematography: Yonezô Maeda
- Edited by: Akira Suzuki
- Music by: Joji Yuasa
- Color process: Technicolor
- Release dates: November 17, 1984 (Japan); March 16, 1987 (USA)
- Running time: 124 mins
- Country: Japan
- Language: Japanese

The Funeral (Japanese: お葬式, Hepburn: Osōshiki) is a 1984 Japanese comedy film written and directed by Juzo Itami.

The film shows the preparations for a traditional Japanese funeral. It mixes grief at the loss of a husband and father with wry observations of the various characters as they interact during the three days of preparation.

The Funeral was Itami's feature film debut and was an enormous success in Japan. It won five Japanese Academy Awards in 1985 including Best Film, Best Director, and Best Actor for Tsutomu Yamazaki. It was nominated in a further five categories and also came first in the annual Kinema Junpo critics' poll. In May 2022, the Criterion Collection released a restoration of the film on Blu-ray. The film was described by The New Yorker as a “prize-winner in Japan”.

Itami took inspiration for the film from his experience with the funeral of his father-in-law (Nobuko Miyamoto's father).

In 1992, it was screened on the United Kingdom's Channel 4 under the title Death, Japanese Style.

== Plot ==
Shinkichi Amamiya (Hideji Otaki) is a difficult 69-year-old man, married to Kikue (Kin Sugai). He dies suddenly of a heart attack, and it falls to his daughter Chizuko (Nobuko Miyamoto) and son-in-law Wabisuke Inoue (Tsutomu Yamazaki) to organize the funeral at their house.

Among other things, the family have to choose a coffin, hire a priest, hold a wake, learn formal funeral etiquette and hold the service itself.

During the three days of preparation, various tensions within the family are hinted at, such as resentment of a rich but stingy uncle, Inoue's affair with a younger woman, and possibly an affair the dead man himself had with a female gateball player.

After the service, the long-suffering wife delivers a dignified speech to the family regretting that the hospital would not let her be with her husband as he died.

== Cast ==
- Tsutomu Yamazaki as Wabisuke Inoue
- Nobuko Miyamoto as Chizuko Amamiya
- Kin Sugai as Kikue Amamiya
- Hideji Otaki as Shokichi Amamiya

== Reception ==
On the review aggregator website Rotten Tomatoes, the film holds an approval rating of 100%, based on 5 reviews, with an average rating of 7.0/10.
