= Mainichi Film Award for Best Actor =

Annual Japanese film awards

- Awarded for: Best actor of the year
- Country: Japan
- First award: 1947

The Mainichi Film Award for Best Actor is a film award given at the Mainichi Film Awards.

== Award winners ==
Year	Film	Actor
1947	A Ball at the Anjo House	Masayuki Mori
1948	Children Hand in Hand	Chishū Ryū
1949	The Quiet Duel; Stray Dog	Takashi Shimura
1950	Kikyō; Shikkō Yūyo	Shin Saburi
1951	Inochi Uruwashi; Umi no Hanabi	Chishū Ryū
1952	The Flavor of Green Tea over Rice; Dōkoku; Nami	Shin Saburi
1953	Tsuma; Fūfu	Ken Uehara
1954	The Sound of the Mountain; Kuroi Shio	So Yamamura
1955	Meoto zenzai Keisatsu Nikki; Watari Dori Itsu Kaeru; Jinsei Tonbo Gaeri	Hisaya Morishige
1956	Anata Kaimasu; Taifū Sōdōki	Keiji Sada
1957	Throne of Blood; The Lower Depths; Shitamachi	Toshiro Mifune
1958	Hadaka no Taishō	Keiju Kobayashi
1959	Fires on the Plain	Eiji Funakoshi
1960	Kuroi Gashū	Keiju Kobayashi
1961	Immortal Love; The Human Condition	Tatsuya Nakadai
1962	Ningen	Taiji Tonoyama
1963	Shiro to Kuro; Eburi Manshi no Yūgana Seikatsu	Keiju Kobayashi
1964	Unholy Desire	Kō Nishimura
1965	A Fugitive from the Past; Nippon Dorobō Monogatari	Rentarō Mikuni
1966	The Pornographers	Shoichi Ozawa
1967	Wakamono Tachi	Kunie Tanaka
1968	The Human Bullet	Minori Terada
1969	It's Tough Being a Man; Tora-san's Cherished Mother; Kigeki Onna wa Dokyō	Kiyoshi Atsumi
1970	Where Spring Comes Late	Hisashi Igawa
1971	Kaoyaku; Inochi Bōni Furou; Kitsune no Kureta Akanbō; Zatoichi and the One-Armed Swordsman	Shintaro Katsu
1972	Kaigun Tokubetsu Nenshōhei; Dobugawa Gakkyū	Takeo Chii
1973	Ningen Kakumei	Tetsurō Tamba
1974	Ranru no Hata	Rentarō Mikuni
1975	Kaseki	Shin Saburi
1976	Yakuza Graveyard	Tetsuya Watari
1977	The Yellow Handkerchief	Ken Takakura
1978	The Demon	Ken Ogata
1979	Shōdō Satsujin Musukoyo	Tomisaburo Wakayama
1980	Kagemusha	Tatsuya Nakadai
1981	Muddy River	Takahiro Tamura
1982	Matagi	Kō Nishimura
1983	The Catch; Yōkirō; The Ballad of Narayama	Ken Ogata
1984	The Funeral; Saraba Hakobune	Tsutomu Yamazaki
1985	Fire Festival; Haru no Kane	Kin'ya Kitaōji
1986	The Sea and Poison	Eiji Okuda
1987	Wakarenu Riyū; A Taxing Woman	Masahiko Tsugawa
1988	Kaisha monogatari: Memories of You	Hajime Hana
1989	Tsuribaka Nisshi 2 Rikyu	Rentarō Mikuni
1990	Uchū no hōsoku Pachinko Monogatari	Masato Furuoya
1991	My Sons; Mo no shigoto Asian Beat: I Love Nippon	Masatoshi Nagase
1992	The Games Teachers Play; Hikinige Family	Kyōzō Nagatsuka
1993	All Under the Moon	Gorō Kishitani
1994	Gokudō Kisha 2 Like a Rolling Stone	Eiji Okuda
1995	Kamikaze Taxi	Kōji Yakusho
1996	Shall We Dance? Nemuru Otoko; Shabu Gokudō	Kōji Yakusho
1997	Onibi	Yoshio Harada
1998	The Bird People in China	Masahiro Motoki
1999	Ano Natsunohi: Tondero Jīchan	Keiju Kobayashi
2000	Gohatto; Gojoe; Jirai o Fundara Sayōnara	Tadanobu Asano
2001	Wasurerarenu Hitobito	Tatsuya Mihashi
2002	The Twilight Samurai; Vengeance for Sale	Hiroyuki Sanada
2003	Tsuribaka Nisshi 14; Get Up!	Toshiyuki Nishida
2004	Blood and Bones	Takeshi Kitano
2005	Rampo Noir; Taga Tameni	Tadanobu Asano
2006	What the Snow Brings	Kōichi Satō
2007	Talk Talk Talk	Taichi Kokubun
2008	Aoi Tori; Still Walking	Hiroshi Abe
2009	Ultra Miracle Love Story	Kenichi Matsuyama
2010	The Lone Scalpel	Shinichi Tsutsumi
2011	Moteki	Mirai Moriyama
2012	Land of Hope	Isao Natsuyagi
2013	The Great Passage	Ryuhei Matsuda
2014	The Light Shines Only There	Gō Ayano
2015	Fires on the Plain	Shinya Tsukamoto
2016	The Long Excuse	Masahiro Motoki
2017	Wilderness	Masaki Suda
2018	And Your Bird Can Sing	Tasuku Emoto
2019	Talking the Pictures	Ryo Narita
2020	Underdog	Mirai Moriyama
2021	In the Wake	Takeru Satoh
2022	The Zen Diary	Kenji Sawada
2023	Egoist	Ryohei Suzuki
