= Blue Ribbon Award for Best Actor =

Annual Japanese film award

- Awarded for: Best Performance by an Actor in a Leading Role
- Country: Japan
- Presented by: The Association of Tokyo Film Journalists
- First award: 1950

The Blue Ribbon Award for Best Actor is as part of its annual Blue Ribbon Awards for Japanese film, to recognize a male actor who has delivered an outstanding performance in a leading role.

== List of winners ==
No.	Year	Recipient	Film(s)
1	1950	So Yamamura	Munekata Kyōdai
2	1951	Toshiro Mifune	Bakuro Ichidai; Onna Gokoro Dareka Shiru
3	1952	N/A	N/A
4	1953	N/A	N/A
5	1954	N/A	N/A
6	1955	Hisaya Morishige	Meoto zenzai
7	1956	Keiji Sada	Anata Kaimasu; Taifū Sōdōki
8	1957	Frankie Sakai	Sun in the Last Days of the Shogunate; Shiawase wa Orera no Negai
9	1958	Ichikawa Raizō	Enjō; Benten Kozō
10	1959	Hiroyuki Nagato	My Second Brother
11	1960	Rentarō Mikuni	Ōinaru Tabiji
12	1961	Toshiro Mifune	Yojimbo; Ánimas Trujano
13	1962	Tatsuya Nakadai	Harakiri
14	1963	Kinnosuke Nakamura	Bushido, Samurai Saga
15	1964	Keiju Kobayashi	Ware Hitotsubu no Mugi Naredo
16	1965	Toshiro Mifune	Red Beard
17	1966	Hajime Hana	Un ga Yokerya
18	1975	Bunta Sugawara	Cops vs. Thugs; Torakku Yarō: Go-iken Muyō; Torakku Yarō: Bakusō Ichibanhoshi
19	1976	Tetsuya Watari	Yakuza Graveyard
20	1977	Ken Takakura	Mount Hakkoda; The Yellow Handkerchief
21	1978	Ken Ogata	The Demon
22	1979	Tomisaburo Wakayama	Shōdō Satsujin Musuko Yo
23	1980	Tatsuya Nakadai	Kagemusha; The Battle of Port Arthur
24	1981	Toshiyuki Nagashima	Enrai
25	1982	Kiyoshi Atsumi	Hearts and Flowers for Tora-san; Tora-san, the Expert
26	1983	Ken Ogata	The Ballad of Narayama; The Geisha; The Catch; Okinawan Boys
27	1984	Tsutomu Yamazaki	The Funeral; Farewell to the Ark
28	1985	Minoru Chiaki	Gray Sunset
29	1986	Kunie Tanaka	House of Wedlock
30	1987	Takanori Jinnai	Chōchin
31	1988	Hajime Hana	Kaisha monogatari: Memories of You
32	1989	Rentarō Mikuni	Rikyu
33	1990	Yoshio Harada	Roningai; Ready to Shoot
34	1991	Naoto Takenaka	Nowhere Man
35	1992	Masahiro Motoki	Sumo Do, Sumo Don't
36	1993	Hiroyuki Sanada	We Are Not Alone
37	1994	Eiji Okuda	Like a Rolling Stone
38	1995	Hiroyuki Sanada	Sharaku; East Meets West; Kinkyū Yobidashi: Emergency Call
39	1996	Kōji Yakusho	Shall We Dance? Nemuru Otoko; Shabu Gokudō
40	1997	Kōji Yakusho	The Eel; Lost Paradise; Cure
41	1998	Takeshi Kitano	Hana-bi
42	1999	Ken Takakura	Poppoya
43	2000	Yūji Oda	Whiteout
44	2001	Mansai Nomura	Onmyoji
45	2002	Kōichi Satō	KT
46	2003	Toshiyuki Nishida	Get Up! Tsuribaka Nisshi 14
47	2004	Akira Terao	Half a Confession
48	2005	Hiroyuki Sanada	Bōkoku no Ījisu
49	2006	Ken Watanabe	Memories of Tomorrow
50	2007	Ryo Kase	I Just Didn't Do It
51	2008	Masahiro Motoki	Departures
52	2009	Shōfukutei Tsurube	Dear Doctor
53	2010	Satoshi Tsumabuki	Villain
54	2011	Yutaka Takenouchi	Oba: The Last Samurai
55	2012	Hiroshi Abe	The Wings of the Kirin; Thermae Romae; Karasu no Oyayubi
56	2013	Kengo Kora	The Story of Yonosuke
57	2014	Tadanobu Asano	My Man
58	2015	Yo Oizumi	Kakekomi
59	2016	Kenichi Matsuyama	Satoshi: A Move for Tomorrow; Chinyūki
60	2017	Sadao Abe	Birds Without Names
61	2018	Hiroshi Tachi	Life in Overtime
62	2019	Kiichi Nakai	Hit Me Anyone One More Time
63	2020	Tsuyoshi Kusanagi	Midnight Swan
64	2021	Junichi Okada	The Fable: The Killer Who Doesn't Kill; Baragaki: Unbroken Samurai
65	2022	Kazunari Ninomiya	Fragments of the Last Will; Tang and Me
66	2023	Ryunosuke Kamiki	Godzilla Minus One
67	2024	Makiya Yamaguchi	A Samurai in Time
68	2025	Satoshi Tsumabuki	Hero's Island
