= Japan Academy Film Prize for Outstanding Performance by an Actor in a Leading Role =

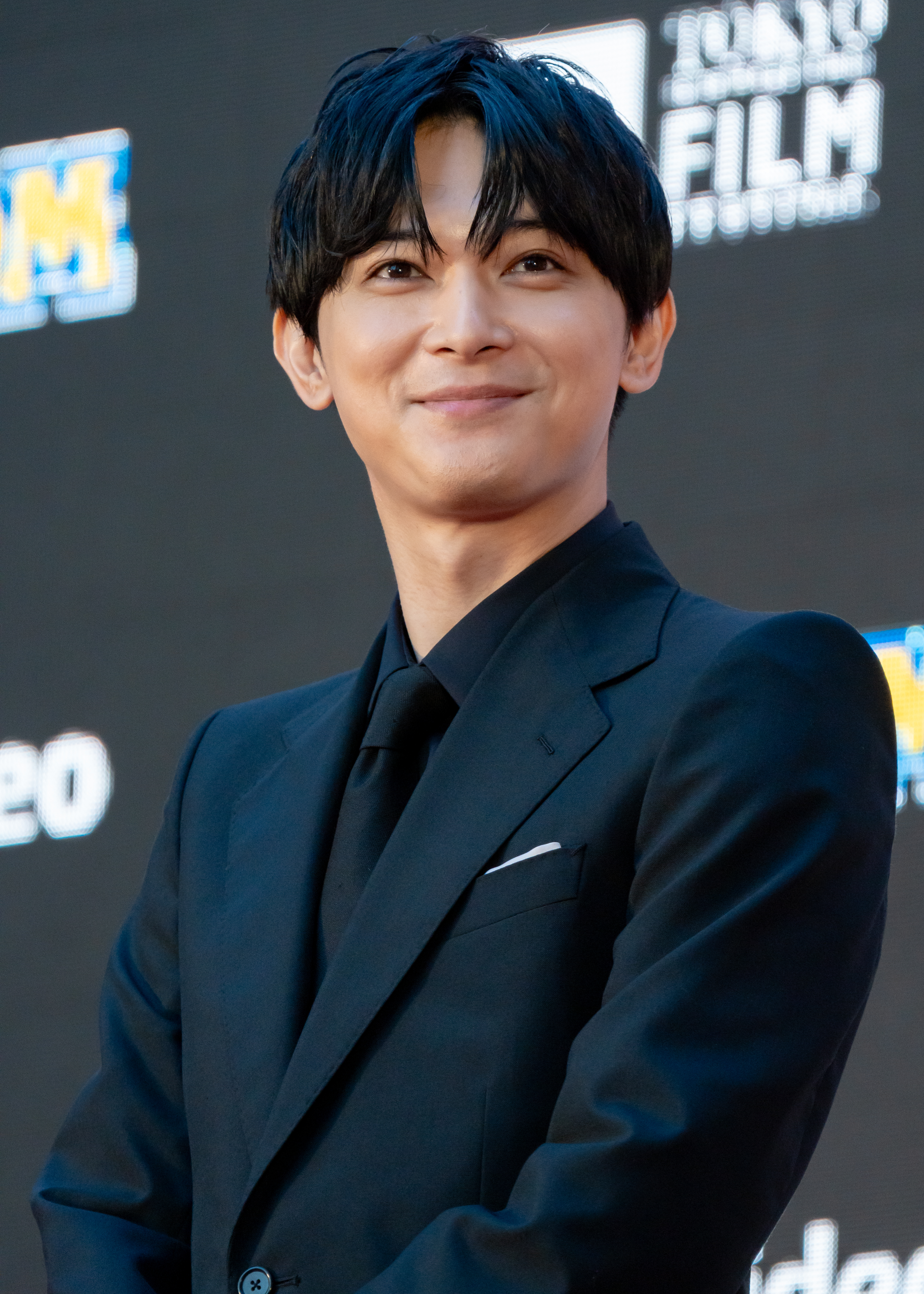
- The 2026 recipient: Ryo Yoshizawa
- Awarded for: Excellence in Acting, Leading Role
- Country: Japan
- Presented by: Japan Academy Film Prize Association
- First award: 1978
- Website: http://www.japan-academy-prize.jp/

The Outstanding Performance by an Actor in a Leading Role (最優秀主演男優賞) of the Japan Academy Film Prize is one of the annual Awards given by the Japan Academy Film Prize Association.

== Winners ==
Nr.	Year	Actor	Role(s)	Film
1	1978	Ken Takakura	Yusaku Shima; Captain Tokushima	The Yellow Handkerchief; Mount Hakkoda
2	1979	Ken Ogata	Sōkichi Takeshita	The Demon
3	1980	Tomisaburo Wakayama	Shuzo Kawase	Oh My Son
4	1981	Ken Takakura	Kōsaku Tajima; Keisuke Miyagi	A Distant Cry from Spring; Dōran
5	1982	Ken Takakura	Eiji Mikami	Station
6	1983	Mitsuru Hirata	Yasu	Fall Guy
7	1984	Ken Ogata	Tatsuhei; Katsuzo Ōta; Fusajiro Obama	The Ballad of Narayama; The Geisha; The Catch
8	1985	Tsutomu Yamazaki	Wabisuke Inoue; Sutekichi Tokito	The Funeral; Farewell to the Ark
9	1986	Minoru Chiaki	Fuyukichi Takano	Gray Sunset
10	1987	Ken Ogata	Katsura Kazuo	House on Fire
11	1988	Tsutomu Yamazaki	Hideki Gondō	A Taxing Woman
12	1989	Toshiyuki Nishida	Zhu Wangli	The Silk Road
13	1990	Rentarō Mikuni	Ichinosuke Suzuki; Sen no Rikyū	Tsuribaka Nisshi; Rikyu
14	1991	Ittoku Kishibe	Toshio	The Sting of Death
15	1992	Rentarō Mikuni	Ichinosuke Suzuki; Akio Asano	Tsuribaka Nisshi 4 My Sons
16	1993	Masahiro Motoki	Shuhei Yamamoto	Sumo Do, Sumo Don't
17	1994	Toshiyuki Nishida	Mr. Kuroi; Densuke Hamasaki	A Class to Remember; Tsuribaka Nisshi 6
18	1995	Kōichi Satō	Tamiya Iemon	Crest of Betrayal
19	1996	Rentarō Mikuni	Ha Shigun	Mitabi no Kaikyō
20	1997	Koji Yakusho	Shohei Sugiyama	Shall We Dance?
21	1998	Koji Yakusho	Takuro Yamashita	The Eel
22	1999	Akira Emoto	Dr. Fuu Akagi	Dr. Akagi
23	2000	Ken Takakura	Otomatsu Satō	Poppoya
24	2001	Akira Terao	Ihei Misawa	After the Rain
25	2002	Yōsuke Kubozuka	Sugihara	Go
26	2003	Hiroyuki Sanada	Seibei Iguchi	The Twilight Samurai
27	2004	Kiichi Nakai	Yoshimura Kanichiro	When the Last Sword Is Drawn
28	2005	Akira Terao	Soichiro Kaji	Half a Confession
29	2006	Hidetaka Yoshioka	Ryunosuke Chagawa	Always: Sunset on Third Street
30	2007	Ken Watanabe	Masayuki Saeki	Memories of Tomorrow
31	2008	Hidetaka Yoshioka	Ryunosuke Chagawa	Always: Sunset on Third Street 2
32	2009	Masahiro Motoki	Daigo Kobayashi	Departures
33	2010	Ken Watanabe	Hajime Onchi	Shizumanu Taiyō
34	2011	Satoshi Tsumabuki	Yuichi Shimizu	Villain
35	2012	Yoshio Harada	Yoshi Kazamatsuri	Someday
36	2013	Hiroshi Abe	Lucius	Thermae Romae
37	2014	Ryuhei Matsuda	Mitsuya Majime	The Great Passage
38	2015	Junichi Okada	Kyuzo Miyabe	The Eternal Zero
39	2016	Kazunari Ninomiya	Koji Fukuhara	Nagasaki: Memories of My Son
40	2017	Kōichi Satō	Yoshinobu Mikami	64: Part I
41	2018	Masaki Suda	Shinji Sawamura	Wilderness
42	2019	Koji Yakusho	Shōgo Ōgami	The Blood of Wolves
43	2020	Tori Matsuzaka	Takumi Sugihara	The Journalist
44	2021	Tsuyoshi Kusanagi	Nagisa	Midnight Swan
45	2022	Hidetoshi Nishijima	Yūsuke Kafuku	Drive My Car
46	2023	Satoshi Tsumabuki	Akira Kido	A Man
47	2024	Koji Yakusho	Hirayama	Perfect Days
48	2025	Ryusei Yokohama	Kaburagi	Faceless
49	2026	Ryo Yoshizawa	Kikuo Tachibana	Kokuho

== Multiple wins ==
The following individuals received two or more Best Actor awards:

Wins	Actor
4	Ken Takakura
4	Koji Yakusho
3	Rentarō Mikuni
3	Ken Ogata
2	Masahiro Motoki
2	Toshiyuki Nishida
2	Kōichi Satō
2	Akira Terao
2	Satoshi Tsumabuki
2	Ken Watanabe
2	Tsutomu Yamazaki
2	Hidetaka Yoshioka
