= Yatsuko Tan'ami =

Japanese actress (born 1924)

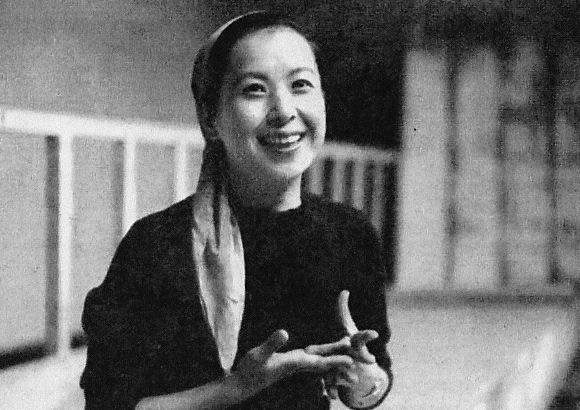
- Tan'ami in 1954
- Born: Yatsuko Tanami; 25 June 1924 (age 102); Tokyo, Japan
- Education: Tokyo Higher Normal School
- Occupation: Actress
- Years active: 1950–2008
- Spouse: Nobuo Kaneko (1923–1995)
- Awards: Japan Film Critics Award

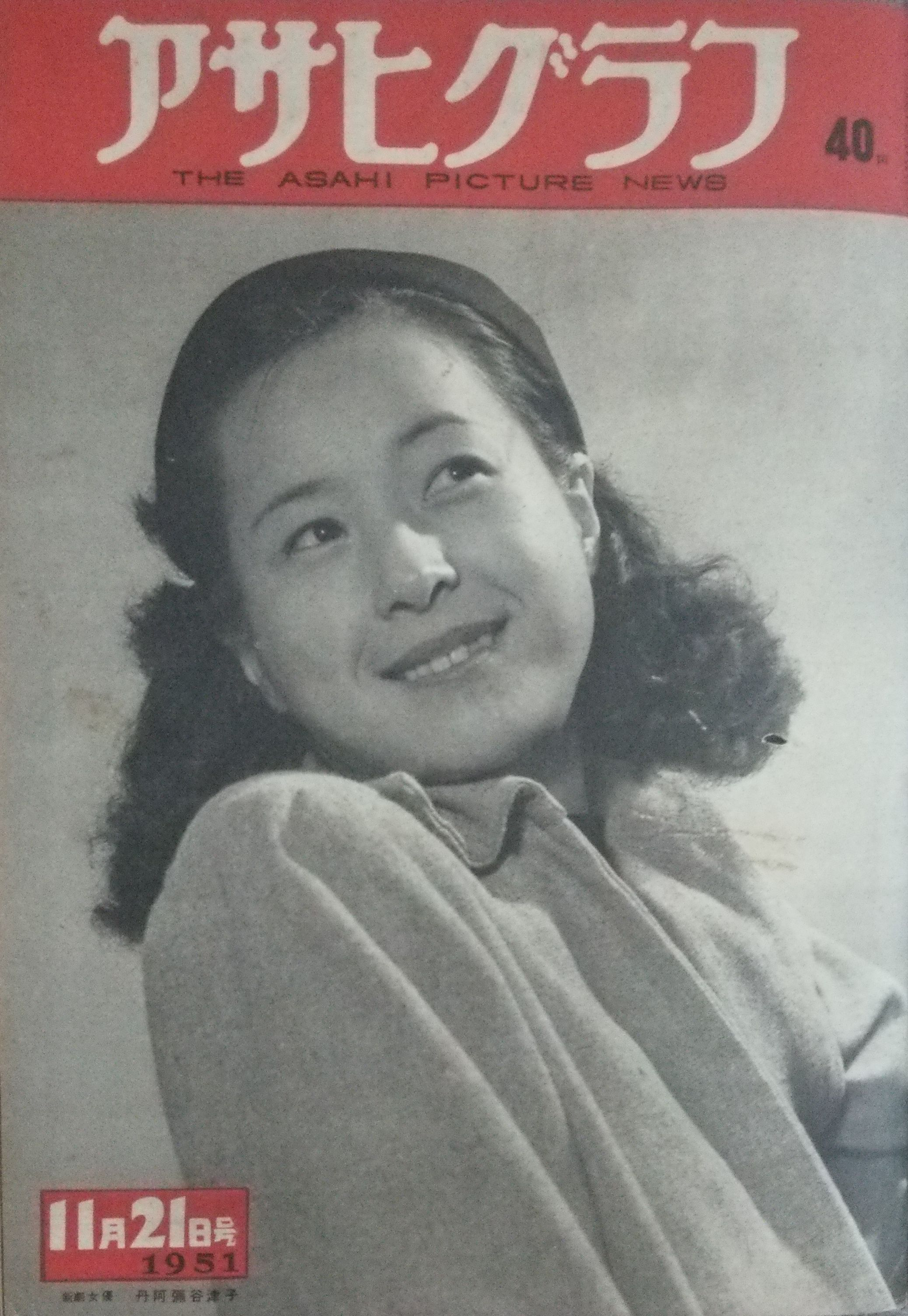
Tan'ami Yatsuko on the cover of Asahigraph in 1951

Yatsuko Kaneko Tanami (Japanese: 丹阿弥 谷津子, born 25 June 1924) is a Japanese actress, known for her performance during the Golden Age of Japanese film.

== Early years ==
Her real name is Yatsuko Kaneko. Her father, Tanami Iwakichi (1901-1992), was a painter from Tokyo who studied under Taikan Yokoyama. Her mother, Tomie, was a paulownia doll artist from Hikami-cho, Hyogo Prefecture (currently Tamba City). Her younger sister Tanami Niwako (1927-) became a copperplate engraver after entering Bunka Gakuin.

Her family lived in Atelier Village in Nagasaki, Toshima Ward.

== Education ==
In 1937, she graduated from Tokyo Higher Normal School Attached Elementary School and from Tokyo Prefectural 10th High School for Girls. In 1942, she graduated from Bunka Gakuin Faculty of Literature. In 1942 she became a research student at the Bungakuza. In the same year she made her debut in "Matsugoro Tomishima". In 1945, she gained attention for her role as Anya in the new theater joint performance "The Cherry Orchard", and since then she has been known as an actress with both her beauty and acting skills, such as Roxanne in "Cyrano" and Fanny in "Marius".

== Career ==
On 24 March 1954, she left for France to attend the Cannes Film Festival.

In 1964, she formed "Gekidan NLT" with Yukio Mishima, who had left Bungakuza due to the incident. She left the company in 1966 and formed a new group, New Theater Club Marui, with Kaneko. In 1967, she won the Encouragement Prize at the Arts Festival for "Love and Death of an Actress". In 2000, she won the 10th Japan Film Critics Award for Lifetime Achievement. She has made many appearances in TV dramas as the grandmother of her main character. She has appeared in commercials for Paramount Bed, Sawai Pharmaceutical, and others.

== Personal life ==
She was married to actor Nobuo Kaneko until his death in 1995.

She turned 100 in June 2024.

== Filmography ==
=== Film ===
Year	Title	Role	Director	Note
1950	Nanairo no Hana	Madam Tsubaki	Masahisa Sunohara	
1952	At War's End	Tsuruko Sasaki	Hideo Sekigawa	
1952	Ikiru	Bar Hostess	Akira Kurosawa	
1952	Tokyo no Ekubo	Nobuko Kawakami	Shūe Matsubayashi	
1952	Koi no Ōen-danchō	Sanae Kimura	Umetsugu Inoue	
1953	An Inlet of Muddy Water	Harada Seki	Tadashi Imai	
1953	Zoku Jūdai no Seiten	Miss Matsushita	Kozo Saeki	
1953	Wife	Fusako Sagara	Mikio Naruse	
1953	Gendai Shojo	Moriko Yoshimura	Kozo Saeki	
1954	Haha no Hatsukoi	Tamiko	Seiji Hisamatsu	
1954	Sound of the Mountain	Ikeda	Mikio Naruse	
1955	Ejima and Ikushima	Ienobu	Hideo Ōba	
1956	Through A Child's Eye	Junko	Yoshirō Kawazu	
1956	Red and Green	Toyoko Masuyama	Noboru Nakamura	
1957	Untamed Woman		Mikio Naruse	
1958	Symphoney of Love	Shizue Kaneda	Teinosuke Kinugasa	
1958	A Woman of Osaka	Otae	Teinosuke Kinugasa	
1959	The Most Valuable Madam	Yomoko Mihara	Yasuzo Masumura	
1959	Onna Gokoro	Tsukiko	Seiji Maruyama	
1960	When a Woman Loves	Yukiko	Heinosuke Gosho	
1960	Spring Dreams	Tamiko Okudaira	Keisuke Kinoshita	
1961	Adorable Schemers	Mami	Keigo Kimura	
1961	Lost in the Sun	Yaeko Yashiro	Toshio Masuda	
1961	Poignant Story	Hanae	Mikio Naruse	
1962	Akiko		Koji Shima	
1962	Diary of a Mad Old Man	Mutsuko	Keigo Kimura	
1962	Sabakareru Echizen-no-kami	Onui	Tokuzō Tanaka	
1962	Stolen Pleasure	Yukiko	Yasuzo Masumura	
1962	A Woman's Place	Ranko Ishikawa	Mikio Naruse	
1963	Zoku Ōsho		Junya Sato	
1963	A House of Shame	Hisako	Tomotaka Tasaka	
1963	Utsukushii Koyomi	Yajima Chie	Kenjirō Morinaga	
1963	Kekkonshiki Kekkonshiki	Mitsuko	Noboru Nakamura	
1964	The World's Most Beautiful Swindlers	Kinu	Hiromichi Horikawa	
1964	A Public Benefactor	Kaneko Yokota	Satsuo Yamamoto	
1964	Geisha Gakkō		Keigo Kimura	
1967	The Wife of Seishu Hanaoka	Saheiji's Wife	Yasuzo Masumura	
1967	Nani wa naku tomo zen'in shûgô!!		Yūsuke Watanabe	
1968	Amadera Maruhi Monogatari	Kiyo	Sadao Nakajima	
1968	Lone Wolf Isazo		Kazuo Ikehiro	
1968	Eternal Love	Mitsuyo Shinjo	Katsumi Nishikawa	
1979	Demon Pond	Nurse	Masahiro Shinoda	
1979	The Shogun Assassins	Mochizuki Chiyome	Sadao Nakajima	
1986	Lost in the Wilderness	Hatsu Uemura	Junya Sato	
1987	Guys Who Never Learn	Haruyo Abe	Azuma Morisaki	
1988	Free and Easy	Hisae Suzuki	Tomio Kuriyama	
1989	Free and Easy II	Hisae Suzuki	Tomio Kuriyama	
1990	Tsuribaka nisshi 3	Hisae Suzuki	Tomio Kuriyama	
1991	Tsuribaka Nisshi 4	Hisae Suzuki	Tomio Kuriyama	
1993	Tsuribaka Nisshi 6	Hisae Suzuki	Tomio Kuriyama	
2006	Three Year Delivery	Aki	Miako Tadano	

=== Television ===
Year	Title	Role	Note
1961	Hakai		
1961	Green Gekijō		Episode 18: Ore wa Shiranai
1961	Kiken na Shamen		
1962	Takasebune		
1965	The Brothers and Sisters of the Toda Family		
1966	Kawa no Hotori de		
1967	Tokyo Story		
1974	Submersion of Japan	Kayo Onodera the mother of Toshio	
1976	Kaze to kumo to niji to		
1978	Queen Mother of the West	Queen Mother of the West	1 episode
1980	Ikenaka Genta 80 kilo	Harue	
1980	Hadaka no Taisho Horoki		
1981	Haha taru koto wa jigoku no gotoku	Sawako	TV movie
1984	Aoi Hitomi no Seiraifu		
1981	Kazunomiya sama otome	Oshizu	TV movie
1988	Kaseifu wa mita! 6		TV movie
1989	New Tokyo Story	Tomi Hirayama	TV movie
1993	Eenyobo	Toki Asakura	86 episodes
2004	Sakura Sakumade	Hana Wakabayashi	
2007	Asakusa Fukumaru Ryokan		1 episode
2008	Saigo no Senpan		TV movie
