= Tsuribaka Nisshi =

Japanese manga series

- Cover of the first tankōbon volume, featuring, Densuke Hamasaki (front)

釣りバカ日誌
- Genre: Sports
- Manga
- Written by: Jūzō Yamasaki
- Illustrated by: Kenichi Kitami
- Published by: Shogakukan
- Magazine: Big Comic Original
- Original run: 1979 – present
- Volumes: 117
- Anime television series
- Directed by: Tetsuo Imazawa
- Produced by: Taro Iwamoto; Go Nakajima; Satoshi Katayose; Takashi Washio
- Written by: Katsuyuki Sumisawa; Ryo Kawasaki
- Music by: Kazunori Maruyama
- Studio: Toei Animation
- Original network: ANN (TV Asahi)
- Original run: November 2, 2002 – September 13, 2003
- Episodes: 36

Tsuribaka Nisshi (釣りバカ日誌; "Fishing Nut's Diary") is a Japanese fishing-themed manga series written by Jūzō Yamasaki and illustrated by Kenichi Kitami. It has been serialized in Shogakukan's seinen manga magazine Big Comic Original since 1979. It won the 28th Shogakukan Manga Award in 1983. The series has been adapted into a popular and long running movie series and anime television series. By 2020, it had over 26 million copies in circulation.

== Overview ==
The story focuses on salaryman Densuke Hamasaki (a.k.a. Hama-chan), whom his supervisor Sasaki has dubbed the "Fishing Baka" because of his passion for fishing. One day Hama-chan meets and befriends an older fisherman named Su-san, who turns out to be Ichinosuke Suzuki, the CEO of the "Suzuki Construction" company that Hama-chan works for. The stories tend to focus on their relationship inside and outside of the office.

== Characters ==
Densuke Hamasaki (浜崎 伝助, Hamasaki Densuke)
Nicknamed Hama-chan (ハマちゃん). A salaryman/fishing baka who escapes his boring work life through fishing.
Michiko Hamasaki (浜崎 みち子, Hamasaki Michiko)
Hama-chan's wife.
Koitarō Hamasaki (浜崎 鯉太郎, Hamazaki Koitarō)
Hama-chan's son.
Hazetarō (ハゼタロウ)
The Hamasaki family dog.
Ichinosuke Suzuki (鈴木 一之助, Suzuki Ichinosuke)
Nicknamed Sū-san (スーさん). Hama-chan's boss who becomes his fishing apprentice.
Kazuo Sasaki (佐々木 和男, Sasaki Kazuo)
Hama-chan's supervisor who doesn't understand his love for fishing and sometimes mispronounces his name as Hamazaki.
Kenichirō Dago (多胡 賢一郎, Dago Ken'ichirō)
Tetsuo Akiyama (秋山 哲夫, Akiyama Tetsuo)
Nakamori (中森)
Ichirō Asamoto (朝本 一郎, Asamoto Ichirō)
Kōzō Doi (土井 光三, Doi Kōzō)
Haruo Inagawa (稲川 春男, Inagawa Haruo)

== Manga ==
The individual chapters have been collected into volumes from July 29, 1980, to volume 117 on November 28, 2025

== Film series ==
The franchise had a live-action film series that spanned 20 mainline films released from 1988 to 2009, along with two spin-off films. The following are lists of the films and the regular cast members.

=== Series ===
Title	Release date	Japanese box office		Nippon TV	
Title	Release date	Distributor rentals	Gross receipts	Rating	Airing date
Tsuribaka Nisshi	December 1988	¥1,250,000,000	¥2,130,000,000	Unknown	Unknown
Tsuribaka Nisshi 2	December 1989	¥1,410,000,000	¥1,410,000,000+	27.7%	1995-01-13
Tsuribaka Nisshi 3	December 1990	¥1,410,000,000	¥1,410,000,000+	24.1%	1994-07-22
Tsuribaka Nisshi 4	December 1991	¥1,420,000,000	¥1,420,000,000+	28.4%	1994-02-04
Tsuribaka Nisshi 5	December 1992	¥1,450,000,000	¥1,450,000,000+	27.1%	1994-09-16
Tsuribaka Nisshi 6	December 1993	¥1,570,000,000	¥1,570,000,000+	28.3%	1994-12-23
Tsuribaka Nisshi Special	July 1994	¥570,000,000	¥570,000,000+	Unknown	
Tsuribaka Nisshi 7	December 1994	¥1,550,000,000	¥1,550,000,000+	Unknown	
Tsuribaka Nisshi 8	August 1996	¥500,000,000	¥500,000,000+	Unknown	
Tsuribaka Nisshi 9	September 1997	¥450,000,000	¥450,000,000+	Unknown	
Tsuribaka Nisshi 10	August 1998	¥510,000,000	¥510,000,000+	Unknown	
Hana no O-Edo no Tsuribaka Nisshi	December 1998	¥480,000,000	¥480,000,000+	Unknown	
Tsuribaka Nisshi Eleven	February 2000	—N/a	¥613,000,000	Unknown	
Tsuribaka Nisshi 12: Shijō Saidai no Yukyū Kyūka	August 2001	—N/a	¥560,000,000	Unknown	
Tsuribaka Nisshi 13: Hama-chan Kiki Ippatsu!	August 2002	—N/a	¥650,000,000	Unknown	
Tsuribaka Nisshi 14: O-Henro Dai Panic!	September 2003	—N/a	¥600,000,000	Unknown	
Tsuribaka Nisshi 15: Hama-chan ni Ashita wa nai!?	August 2004	—N/a	¥510,000,000	Unknown	
Tsuribaka Nisshi 16: Hamasaki wa Kyou mo Dama datta	August 2005	—N/a	¥580,000,000	Unknown	
Tsuribaka Nisshi 17: Ato wa Noto nare Hama to nare!	August 2006	—N/a	¥465,900,000	Unknown	
Tsuribaka Nisshi 18: Hama-chan Su-san Seto no Yakusoku	August 2007	—N/a	¥453,100,000	Unknown	
Tsuribaka Nisshi 19: Yokoso! Suzuki Kensetsu Goikko Sama	October 2008	—N/a	¥346,000,000	Unknown	
Tsuribaka Nisshi 20: Final	December 2009	—N/a	¥840,000,000	Unknown	
Total			¥19,068,000,000		

=== Regular cast ===
- Densuke Hamasaki: Toshiyuki Nishida (1~)
- Ichinosuke Suzuki: Rentarō Mikuni (1~)
- Michiko Hamasaki: Eri Ishida (1~Special), Miyoko Asada (7~)
- Koitarou Hamasaki: Tomo Ueno (10~11), Ryūichi Sugawara (12~13), Kaga Mochimaru (14~)
- Kazuo Sasaki: Kei Tani (1~)
- Hachirou Ohta: Ken Nakamoto (1~)
- Hisae Suzuki: Yatsuko Tanami (1~6), Tomoko Naraoka (9~)
- Director Akiyama: Takehiko Maeda (1), Takeshi Katō (3~)
- Executive Director Hotta: Takehiko Maeda (3~8), Shinobu Tsuruta (9~10, 12~), Shūichirō Moriyama (11)
- Chief of Personnel Haraguchi: Raita Ryū (7~10), Toshio Shiba (11~13), Takehiko Ono (14~)
- Secretary Kusamori: Yasuhisa Sonoda (2~6), Takuzō Kadono (7~9), Baijaku Nakamura (10~13, 15~), Yōsuke Saitō (14)
- Section Chief Funaki: Tōru Masuoka (15~)
- Chief Clerk Takoshima: Mitsuru Katō (11~12, 16~), Hiroshi Iwazaki (13)
- Maebara: Takashi Sasano (1~)

== Anime television series ==
=== Cast ===
- Densuke Hamasaki: Kōichi Yamadera
- Ichinosuke Suzuki: Chikao Ōtsuka
- Michiko Hamasaki: Misa Watanabe
- Koitarou Hamasaki: Akemi Satō
- Hazatarou: Naomi Shindō (2nd voice)
- Kazuo Sasaki: Naoki Tatsuta
- Sasaki's Wife: Chie Satō
- Madoko Suzuki: Emiko Tanada
- Kenichirou Dago: Tomokazu Seki
- Reiko Nakamura: Makiko Ōmoto
- Yuusuke Sou: Katsuyuki Konishi
- Narration, Chief Akiyama, Hazetarou (1st voice): Yasuhiko Kawazu

It has a crossover with Bakuryuu Sentai Abaranger.

== TV series ==
- Gaku Hamada: Densuke Hamasaki
- Toshiyuki Nishida: Ichinosuke Suzuki
