= Nakamura Baijaku II =

Nakamura Baijaku II 中村 梅雀
- Also known as: Manabu Nakamura
- Born: Shinichi Mitsui; 12 December 1955 (age 70); Musashino, Tokyo, Japan
- Occupations: Actor, bassist, composer
- Years active: 1965–present

Shinichi Mitsui (三井 進一, Mitsui Shin'ichi; born 12 December 1955), better known as Nakamura Baijaku II (二代目 中村 梅雀, Nidaime Nakamura Baijaku), is a Japanese actor, bassist, and composer. He graduated from Tokyo Metropolitan Ogikubo High School and later graduated from Toho Gakuen College of Drama and Music.

Nakamura also has relatives who are kabuki actors.

- Great-grandfather: Nakamura Kanemon II.
- Grandfather: Nakamura Kanemon III (Note: Real Name: Kanejirō Mitsui (Japanese: 三井金次郎, Hepburn: Mitsui Kanejirō).).
- Father: Nakamura Umenosuke IV (Note: Real Name: Teruo Mitsui (Japanese: 三井鐵男, Hepburn: Mitsui Teruo).).

His trade name is Narikomaya (成駒屋) and debuted in 1965. Nakamura learned about kabuki and modern theater at the Zenshinza troupe. His initial name was Manabu Nakamura (中村 まなぶ, Nakamura Manabu). Nakamura took on the name of his great-grandfather Baijaku in 1980 during the 50th Anniversary Performance of Zenshinza and became "Baijaku II". At the final performance of Otose in 2007, Nakamura announced he was leaving Zenshinza and turning freelance.

== Filmography ==
=== TV series ===
Year	Title	Role	Notes	Ref.
1969	Ten to chi to	Suwa Katsuyori	Taiga drama	
1985	Sanada Taiheiki	Tokugawa Hidetada		
1995	Hachidai Shogun Yoshimune	Tokugawa Ieshige	Taiga drama	
1997	Mōri Motonari	Shiji Hiroyoshi	Taiga drama	
2000	Aoi	Tokugawa Mitsukuni / narrator	Taiga drama	
2003	Teru Teru Kazoku	Senkichi Anzai	Asadora	
2006	Kōmyō ga Tsuji	Tokugawa Hidetada	Taiga drama	
2008	Atsuhime	Ii Naosuke	Taiga drama	
2009–17	Prosecutor Akakabu	Shigeru Hiiragi	Lead role; 7 television films	
2010	Prosecutor Akakabu in Kyoto	Shigeru Hiiragi	Lead role	
2012	Taira no Kiyomori	Taira no Iesada	Taiga drama	
2014	The Thorns of Alice	Kazufumi Mizuno		
2017	Naotora: The Lady Warlord	Narrator	Taiga drama	
2022	Bakumatsu Aibō-den	Iwakura Tomomi	Television film	
2022	Kamen Rider Black Sun	Darom		
2022–24	Gannibal	Sabu	2 seasons	

=== Films ===
Year	Title	Role	Notes	Ref.
1997	Lie Lie Lie	Mitani		
1998	Tsuribaka Nisshi Ten	Kusamori		
2000	Tsuribaka Nisshi Eleven	Kusamori		
2000	A Class to Remember	Kuroi Sensei		
2001	Tsuribaka Nisshi 12: Shijō Saidai no Yūkyū Kyūka	Kusamori		
2002	Tsuribaka Nisshi 13: Hama-chan Kikiippatsu!	Kusamori		
2002	The Twilight Samurai	Terauchi Gonbee		
2003	The Blue Light	Eiji Yamamoto		
2004	Tsuribaka Nisshi 15: Hama-chan ni Ashita Wanai!?	Kusamori		
2005	Tsuribaka Nisshi 16: Hamasaki wa Kyō mo Damedatta	Kusamori		
2007	Tsuribaka Nisshi 18: Hama-chan Sū-san Seto no Yakusoku	Kusamori		
2008	Tsuribaka Nisshi 19: Yokoso! Suzuki Kensetsu Goikko Sama	Kusamori		
2011	Bunny Drop	Daikichi's father		
2011	Hara-Kiri: Death of a Samurai	Chijiiwa Jinnai		
2018	Kids on the Slope	Tsutomu Mukae		
2020	The Dignified Death of Shizuo Yamanaka	Shizuo Yamanaka	Lead role	
2021	Last of the Wolves	Takayuki Seshima		
2026	Homura	Tomita Ujizane		
