= Tsuribaka Nisshi Eleven =

- Film poster
- Directed by: Katsuhide Motoki
- Based on: Tsuribaka Nisshi by Jūzō Yamasaki and Kenichi Kitami
- Starring: Toshiyuki Nishida; Miyoko Asada; Takehiro Murata; Sachiko Sakurai
- Music by: Yoshikazu Suo
- Release date: February 5, 2000 (Japan)
- Running time: 112 minutes
- Country: Japan
- Language: Japanese

Tsuribaka Nisshi Eleven (Japanese: 釣りバカ日誌イレブン) is a 2000 Japanese film directed by Katsuhide Motoki.

== Cast ==
- Toshiyuki Nishida as Hamada Densuke
- Rentaro Mikuni as Suzuki Ichinosuke
- Miyoko Asada as Mamada Michiko
- Tomoko Naraoka as Suzuki
- Takehiro Murata as Usami Goro
- Kei Tani as Sasaki Kazuo
- Akira Onodera as Kawashima
- Takashi Sasano as Maebara
- Toshio Shiba as Haraguchi
- Sachiko Sakurai as Isomura Shino
