= Senbonzakura =

Senbonzakura may refer to:

- Yoshitsune Senbon Zakura
- Ukare Gitsune Senbon Zakura
- "Senbonzakura" (song)
