= List of 1995 box office number-one films in Japan =

This is a list of films which have placed number one at the weekly box office in Japan during 1995. Amounts are in Yen and are from a sample of key cities.

== Number one films ==
†	This implies the highest-grossing movie of the year.

#	Week ending	Film	Box office	Notes	Ref
1	6 January 1995	Speed	¥449,568,300		
2	13 January 1995	Speed	¥275,913,693		
3	20 January 1995	Speed	¥284,837,157		
4	27 January 1995	Speed	¥186,010,566		
5	3 February 1995	Speed	¥186,749,145		
6	10 February 1995	Speed	¥177,535,710		
7	17 February 1995	Mary Shelley's Frankenstein	¥237,869,220		
8	24 February 1995	Mary Shelley's Frankenstein	¥187,053,442		
9	3 March 1995	The Mask	¥248,714,370		
10	10 March 1995	The Mask	¥215,546,695		
11	17 March 1995	Forrest Gump	¥496,118,841	Forrest Gump had a record opening for Paramount Pictures in Japan grossing $7.6 million nationwide in five days	
12	24 March 1995	Forrest Gump	¥415,359,885		
13	31 March 1995	Forrest Gump	¥408,401,186		
14	7 April 1995	Forrest Gump	¥363,328,812		
15	14 April 1995	Forrest Gump	¥278,596,230		
16	21 April 1995	Forrest Gump	¥238,486,888		
17	28 April 1995	Forrest Gump	¥200,878,592		
18	5 May 1995	Forrest Gump	¥331,657,116		
19	12 May 1995	Outbreak	¥144,358,665	Outbreak reached number one in its second week of release	
20	19 May 1995	Outbreak	¥130,968,930		
21	26 May 1995	Outbreak	¥129,840,135		
22	2 June 1995	Outbreak	¥144,117,330		
23	9 June 1995	Outbreak	¥117,014,100		
24	16 June 1995	Outbreak	¥113,901,190		
25	23 June 1995	Batman Forever	¥126,319,180		
26	30 June 1995	Batman Forever	¥111,850,310		
27	7 July 1995	Die Hard with a Vengeance †	¥705,585,834	Die Hard with a Vengeance set a record opening for 20th Century Fox beating Return of the Jedi with a five-day gross of $13.5 million nationally	
28	14 July 1995	Die Hard with a Vengeance †	¥501,872,536		
29	21 July 1995	Die Hard with a Vengeance †	¥434,784,588		
30	28 July 1995	Die Hard with a Vengeance †	¥392,872,832		
31	4 August 1995	Die Hard with a Vengeance †	¥351,586,781		
32	11 August 1995	Waterworld	¥321,054,274		
33	18 August 1995	Die Hard with a Vengeance †	¥389,435,794	Die Hard with a Vengeance returned to number one in its seventh week of release	
34	25 August 1995	Waterworld	¥249,541,230	Waterworld returned to number one in its third week of release	
35	1 September 1995	Waterworld	¥220,187,963		
36	5 September 1995	Waterworld	¥150,796,000		
37	15 September 1995	Waterworld	¥136,728,072		
38	22 September 1995	The Bridges of Madison County	¥215,827,506		
39	29 September 1995	The Bridges of Madison County	¥202,025,900		
40	6 October 1995	The Bridges of Madison County	¥172,161,300		
41	15 October 1995	The Bridges of Madison County	¥210,732,965		
42	22 October 1995	The Bridges of Madison County	¥161,354,400		
43	30 October 1995	The Bridges of Madison County	¥143,550,100		
44	6 November 1995	The Bridges of Madison County	¥140,765,300		
45	13 November 1995	The Bridges of Madison County	¥114,923,900		
46	20 November 1995	The Bridges of Madison County	¥79,524,500		
47	27 November 1995	Species	¥95,082,100		
48	4 December 1995	While You Were Sleeping	¥112,959,309		
49	11 December 1995	Godzilla vs. Destoroyah	¥94,452,877		
50	18 December 1995	GoldenEye	¥150,312,543		
51	25 December 1995	GoldenEye	¥192,286,729		

== Highest-grossing films ==
Rank	Title	Distributor	Distributor income (¥ million)
1.	Die Hard with a Vengeance	20th Century Fox	4,800
2.	Speed	20th Century Fox	4,500
3.	Forrest Gump	UIP	3,870
4.	The Bridges of Madison County	Warner Bros.	2,300
5.	Waterworld	UIP	2,100
6.	Apollo 13	UIP	2,000
7.	Whisper of the Heart	Toho	1,850
8.	The Mask	Gaga/Humax	1,800
9.	Godzilla vs. SpaceGodzilla	Toho	1,650
10.	Tora-san's Easy Advice/Tsuribaka Nisshi 7 (double bill)	Shochiku	1,550

== See also ==
- Lists of box office number-one films

== Chronology ==
Preceded by 1994	1995
