= List of 1994 box office number-one films in Japan =

This is a list of films which have placed number one at the weekly box office in Japan during 1994. Amounts are in Yen and are from a sample of key cities.

== Number-one films ==
†	This implies the highest-grossing movie of the year.

#	Week ending	Film	Box office	Notes	Ref
1	7 January 1994	Cliffhanger †	¥432,282,256		
2	14 January 1994	Cliffhanger †	¥307,117,020		
3	21 January 1994	Cliffhanger †	¥254,075,472		
4	28 January 1994	Cliffhanger †	¥202,151,182		
5	4 February 1994	Cliffhanger †	¥184,610,556		
6	11 February 1994	Cliffhanger †	¥292,133,192		
7	18 February 1994	Cliffhanger †	¥164,929,275		
8	25 February 1994	Cool Runnings	¥128,904,195		
9	4 March 1994	Schindler's List	¥168,828,320		
10	11 March 1994	Schindler's List	¥167,138,574		
11	18 March 1994	The Three Musketeers	¥165,627,014		
12	25 March 1994	Schindler's List	¥196,263,585	Schindler's List returned to number one in its fourth week of release	
13	1 April 1994	Schindler's List	¥241,936,240		
14	8 April 1994	Schindler's List	¥197,337,525		
15	15 April 1994	Mrs. Doubtfire	¥199,629,141		
16	22 April 1994	Mrs. Doubtfire	¥187,013,701		
17	29 April 1994	Mrs. Doubtfire	¥222,232,602		
18	6 May 1994	Mrs. Doubtfire	¥411,939,024		
19	13 May 1994	Mrs. Doubtfire	¥149,585,384		
20	20 May 1994	Mrs. Doubtfire	¥144,625,208		
21	27 May 1994	Mrs. Doubtfire	¥111,504,952		
22	3 June 1994	Mrs. Doubtfire	¥109,916,730		
23	10 June 1994	Mrs. Doubtfire	¥102,149,117		
24	17 June 1994	Major League II	¥287,534,903		
25	24 June 1994	Major League II	¥240,000,000		
26	1 July 1994	Major League II	¥185,177,916		
27	8 July 1994	Wyatt Earp	¥155,152,228		
28	15 July 1994	Wyatt Earp	¥146,586,342		
29	22 July 1994	Pom Poko	¥190,237,212		
30	29 July 1994	The Lion King	¥283,459,869		
31	5 August 1994	The Lion King	¥248,808,551		
32	12 August 1994	The Lion King	¥261,322,200		
33	19 August 1994	The Lion King	¥316,188,576		
34	26 August 1994	The Lion King	¥187,997,500		
35	2 September 1994	The Lion King	¥197,000,000		
36	9 September 1994	When a Man Loves a Woman	¥148,739,481		
37	16 September 1994	True Lies	¥588,305,322	True Lies had a record opening weekend for Nippon Herald with a gross of ¥301 million	
38	23 September 1994	True Lies	¥413,087,444		
39	30 September 1994	True Lies	¥313,684,371		
40	7 October 1994	True Lies	¥272,963,300		
41	14 October 1994	True Lies	¥257,561,287		
42	21 October 1994	True Lies	¥180,038,499		
43	28 October 1994	True Lies	¥152,653,718		
44	4 November 1994	True Lies	¥185,835,510		
45	11 November 1994	True Lies	¥133,833,210		
46	18 November 1994	True Lies	¥116,459,378		
47	25 November 1994	True Lies	¥123,692,976		
48	2 December 1994	True Lies	¥122,684,300		
49	9 December 1994	Speed	¥494,536,000		
50	16 December 1994	Speed	¥197,680,000	Weekend only	
51	23 December 1994	Speed	TBD		
52	30 December 1994	Speed	¥373,758,681		

== Highest-grossing films ==
Rank	Title	Distributor	Distributor income (¥ million)
1.	Cliffhanger	Toho Towa	4,000
2.	True Lies	Nippon Herald	3,500
3.	Pom Poko	Toho	2,630
4.	Schindler's List	UIP	2,050
5.	The Lion King	Buena Vista International	2,000
6.	Godzilla vs. Mechagodzilla	Toho	1,870
7.	A Perfect World	Warner Bros.	1,700
8.	Mrs. Doubtfire	20th Century Fox	1,600
9.	Tora-san's Matchmaker/Tsuribaka Nisshi 6 (double bill)	Shochiku	1,570
10.	Dragon Ball Z: Broly – Second Coming/Dr. Slump and Arale-chan: Hoyoyo!! Follow the Rescued Shark.../ Slam Dunk (triple bill)	Toei	1,450

== See also ==
- Lists of box office number-one films

Preceded by 1993	1994	Succeeded by 1995
