= List of 1993 box office number-one films in Japan =

This is a list of films which have placed number one at the weekly box office in Japan during 1993. Amounts are in Yen and are from a sample of key cities.

== Number-one films ==
†	This implies the highest-grossing movie of the year.

#	Week ending	Film	Box office	Notes	Ref
1	1 January 1993	Home Alone 2: Lost in New York	¥377,351,500		
2	8 January 1993	Home Alone 2: Lost in New York	¥409,308,250		
3	15 January 1993	Home Alone 2: Lost in New York	¥260,795,682		
4	22 January 1993	The Bodyguard	¥223,173,660	The Bodyguard returned to number one in its seventh week of release	
5	29 January 1993	The Bodyguard	¥201,785,750		
6	5 February 1993	The Bodyguard	¥181,913,456		
7	12 February 1993	The Bodyguard	¥205,435,373		
8	19 February 1993	The Bodyguard	¥182,840,292		
9	26 February 1993	A Few Good Men	¥170,902,232		
10	5 March 1993	A Few Good Men	¥152,695,530		
11	12 March 1993	The Last of the Mohicans	¥181,353,858		
12	19 March 1993	The Last of the Mohicans	¥151,599,084		
13	26 March 1993	The Last of the Mohicans	¥126,907,794		
14	2 April 1993	The Last of the Mohicans	¥123,413,550		
15	9 April 1993	The Last of the Mohicans	¥88,845,346		
16	16 April 1993	The Last of the Mohicans	¥77,578,600		
17	23 April 1993	RoboCop 3	¥147,695,744		
18	30 April 1993	Sister Act	¥122,670,130	Sister Act reached number one in its second week of release	
19	7 May 1993	Sister Act	¥214,454,109		
20	14 May 1993	Sister Act	¥105,141,420		
21	21 May 1993	Under Siege	¥167,216,573		
22	28 May 1993	Indecent Proposal	¥230,208,146		
23	4 June 1993	Indecent Proposal	¥231,854,292		
24	11 June 1993	Indecent Proposal	¥234,597,080		
25	18 June 1993	Indecent Proposal	¥161,988,738		
26	25 June 1993	Indecent Proposal	¥157,000,000		
27	2 July 1993	Hot Shots! Part Deux	¥160,134,625		
28	9 July 1993	Hot Shots! Part Deux	¥114,150,060		
29	16 July 1993	Hot Shots! Part Deux	¥107,279,316		
30	23 July 1993	Jurassic Park †	¥851,766,604	Jurassic Park set an opening weekend record with a gross of $8.376 million (888 million Yen) nationwide in its first 2 days	
31	30 July 1993	Jurassic Park †	¥710,814,195		
32	6 August 1993	Jurassic Park †	¥692,210,367		
33	13 August 1993	Jurassic Park †	¥758,000,000		
34	20 August 1993	Jurassic Park †	¥779,138,256		
35	27 August 1993	Jurassic Park †	¥496,018,536		
36	3 September 1993	Jurassic Park †	¥457,276,768		
37	10 September 1993	Jurassic Park †	¥329,254,762		
38	17 September 1993	Jurassic Park †	¥333,911,550		
39	24 September 1993	The Fugitive	¥327,146,422		
40	1 October 1993	The Fugitive	¥235,220,996		
41	8 October 1993	The Fugitive	¥205,660,352		
42	15 October 1993	The Fugitive	¥225,657,465		
43	22 October 1993	The Fugitive	¥163,212,408		
44	29 October 1993	The Fugitive	¥132,024,924		
45	5 November 1993	Sliver	¥237,783,060		
46	12 November 1993	Sliver	¥151,605,440		
47	19 November 1993	Sliver	¥133,372,764		
48	26 November 1993	Sliver	¥125,732,481		
49	3 December 1993	Sliver	¥92,946,312		
50	10 December 1993	Cliffhanger	¥480,465,432		
51	17 December 1993	Cliffhanger	¥332,700,000		
52	24 December 1993	Cliffhanger	¥349,937,490		
53	31 December 1993	Cliffhanger	¥314,996,022		

== Highest-grossing films ==
Rank	Title	Distributor	Distribution income (¥ million)
1.	Jurassic Park	UIP	8,300
2.	The Bodyguard	Warner Bros.	4,100
3.	Aladdin	Buena Vista	2,500
4.	Home Alone 2	Fox	2,500
5.	The Fugitive	Warner Bros.	2,250
6.	Godzilla vs. Mothra	Toho	2,220
7.	Rex: A Dinosaur's Story	Shochiku	2,200
8.	Samurai Kids	Toho	2,030
9.	Doraemon: Nobita and the Tin Labyrinth	Toho	1,650
10.	Tora-san Makes Excuses; Tsuribaka Nisshi 5 (double feature)	Shochiku	1,450

== See also ==
- Lists of box office number-one films

1993	Succeeded by 1994
