= Gakko II =

- Film poster
- Directed by: Yoji Yamada
- Written by: Yoji Yamada; Yoshitaka Asama
- Produced by: Hiroshi Fukazawa
- Starring: Toshiyuki Nishida; Hidetaka Yoshioka; Masatoshi Nagase; Ayumi Ishida; Hiroshi Kanbe
- Cinematography: Mutsuo Naganuma
- Edited by: Iwao Ishii
- Music by: Isao Tomita
- Distributed by: Shochiku
- Release date: 19 October 1996 (Japan)
- Running time: 122 minutes
- Country: Japan
- Language: Japanese

Gakko II (Japanese: 学校II, Hepburn: Gakkō II), also known as A Class to Remember II, is a 1996 Japanese film directed by Yoji Yamada. It is a sequel to Yamada's 1993 film A Class to Remember.

The film was Japan's submission to the 69th Academy Awards for the Academy Award for Best Foreign Language Film, but was not accepted as a nominee.

== Cast ==
- Toshiyuki Nishida
- Hidetaka Yoshioka
- Masatoshi Nagase
- Ayumi Ishida
- Hiroshi Kanbe
- Pinko Izumi
- Hideko Hara
- Yoshiaki Umegaki
- Takashi Sasano
- Ayumi Hamasaki

== Gakkō series ==
- A Class to Remember (1993)
- Gakkō II (1996)
- Gakkō III a.k.a. A Class to Remember III (1998)
- Jūgosai Gakkō a.k.a. A Class to Remember IV (2000)

== See also ==
- Cinema of Japan
- List of submissions to the 69th Academy Awards for Best Foreign Language Film
- List of Japanese submissions for the Academy Award for Best Foreign Language Film
