= Tsuribaka Nisshi 4 =

Japanese name
- Kanji: 釣りバカ日誌4
- Kana: つりバカにっし4
- Directed by: Tomio Kuriyama
- Starring: Toshiyuki Nishida; Rentarō Mikuni
- Cinematography: Kōsuke Yasuda
- Music by: Masaru Sato
- Distributed by: Shochiku
- Release date: 23 December 1991
- Running time: 96 minutes
- Country: Japan
- Language: Japanese

Tsuribaka Nisshi 4 (釣りバカ日誌4, Tsuribaka Nisshi 4) is a 1991 Japanese film directed by Tomio Kuriyama. It was released on 23 December 1991. It is the fourth film in the Tsuribaka Nisshi series.

== Awards ==
15th Japan Academy Prize

- Won: Best Actor – Rentarō Mikuni
- Nominated: Best Music – Masaru Sato
