= Keisatsu Nikki =

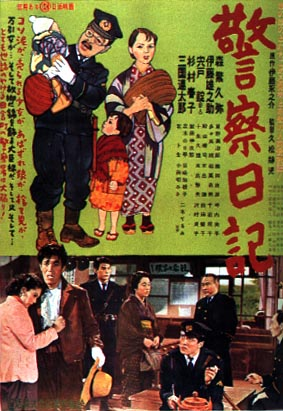
- Japanese movie poster
- Directed by: Seiji Hisamatsu
- Screenplay by: Toshirō Ide
- Story by: Einosuke Itō
- Starring: Masao Mishima; Hisaya Morishige; Yukiyo Toake; Rentarō Mikuni; Miki Odagiri
- Cinematography: Shinsaku Himeda
- Edited by: Mitsuo Kondō
- Music by: Ikuma Dan
- Distributed by: Nikkatsu
- Release date: February 3, 1955 (Japan)
- Running time: 110 minutes
- Country: Japan
- Language: Japanese

Keisatsu Nikki (Japanese: 警察日記; lit. "Policeman's Diary") is a 1955 black-and-white Japanese film directed by Seiji Hisamatsu and produced by Nikkatsu.

== Cast ==
- Masao Mishima as Ishiwarai, the Head of Police
- Hisaya Morishige as Policeman Yoshii
- Yukiyo Toake
- Rentarō Mikuni as Policeman Hakanawa
- Miki Odagiri
- Yūnosuke Itō
- Jō Shishido as Policeman Yabuta
- Terumi Niki as Yukiko
- Haruko Sugimura as Moyo Sugita
