= Junzaburō Ban =

Japanese comedian and actor (1908–1981)

Junzaburo Ban
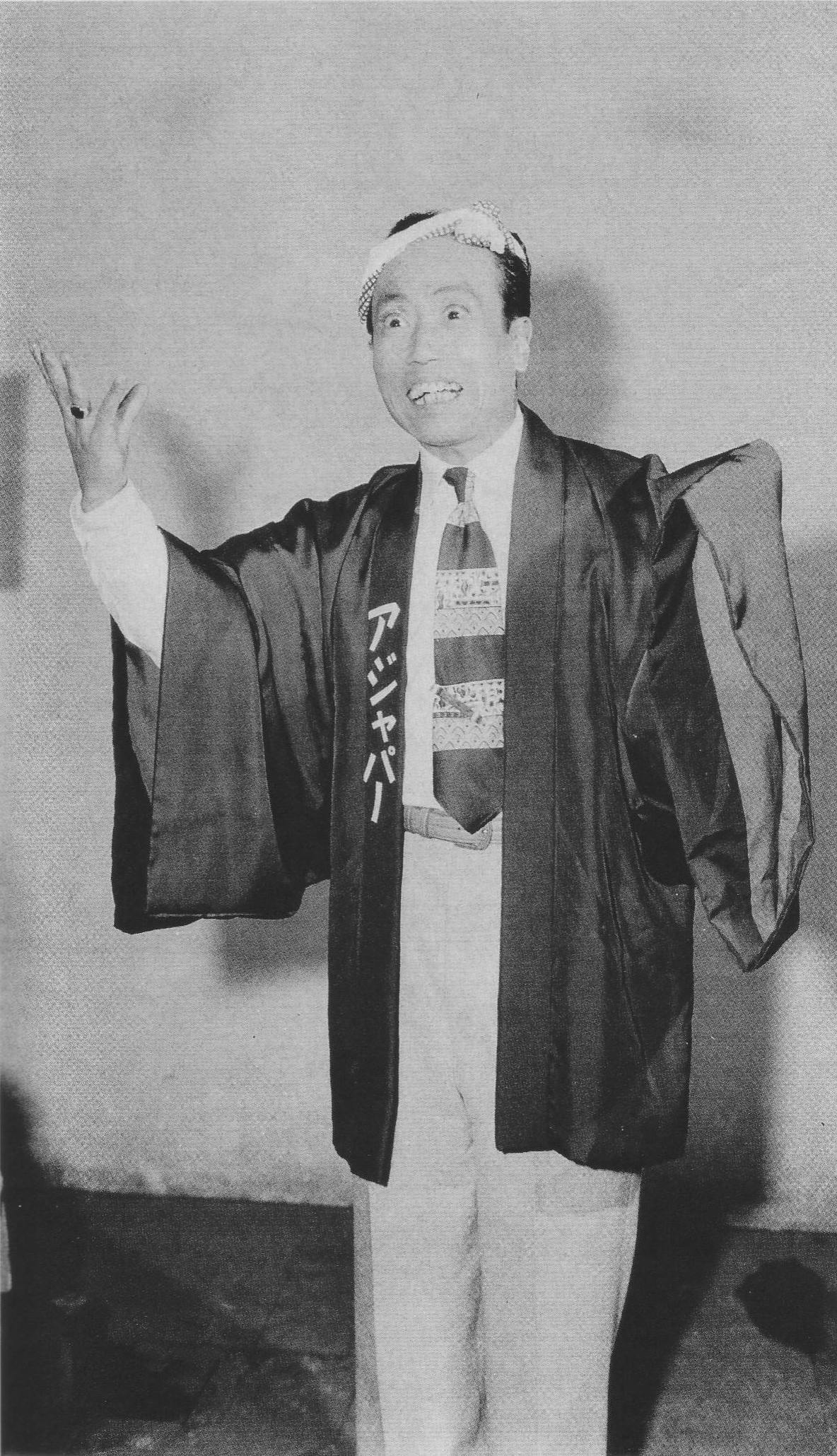
- Junzaburo Ban (1953)
- Born: Junzaburo Ban; January 10, 1908; Yonezawa, Yamagata, Japan
- Died: October 26, 1981 (aged 73); Tokyo
- Occupations: Actor, Comedian

Junzaburō Ban (伴淳三郎, Ban Junzaburō; January 10, 1908 – October 26, 1981) was a Japanese comedian and actor. His real name was Hirosada Suzuki (鈴木寛定, Suzuki Hirosada).

== Filmography ==
- Ukare Gitsune Senbon Zakura (1954)
- A Fugitive from the Past (1965)
- Dodes'ka-den (1970)
- Wandering Ginza Butterfly 2: She-Cat Gambler (1972)
- Proof of the Man (1977)
- Queen Bee (1978)
- Matagi (1982)
