= The Good Fairy (1951 film) =

1951 Japanese film

- Re-release poster

Japanese name
- Kanji: 善魔
- Directed by: Keisuke Kinoshita
- Written by: Keisuke Kinoshita; Kōgo Noda; Kunio Kishida (novel)
- Produced by: Takashi Koide
- Starring: Rentarō Mikuni; Masayuki Mori; Chikage Awashima
- Cinematography: Hiroshi Kusuda
- Edited by: Yoshi Sugihara
- Music by: Tadashi Kinoshita
- Production company: Shochiku
- Distributed by: Shochiku
- Release date: 17 February 1951 (Japan)
- Running time: 108 minutes
- Country: Japan
- Language: Japanese

The Good Fairy (Japanese: 善魔, Hepburn: Zenma; lit. Good Demon) is a 1951 Japanese drama film based on a novel by Kunio Kishida and directed by Keisuke Kinoshita. It is the film debut of actor Rentarō Mikuni (born Masao Sato), who took his character name as his stage name.

== Plot ==
Newspaper editor Nakanuma sends out his reporter Rentarō to find Itsuko Kitaura, a politician's wife who left her husband, for an exclusive interview.

Nakanuma had been in love with Itsuko as a student, but didn't propose to her due to his poor financial situation. He now has a mistress, Suzue, whom he treats rather carelessly.

Rentarō succeeds in finding Itsuko, who hides at a friend's place, and talking her into the interview. Itsuko admits that she married her husband to gain social status, but was increasingly repelled by his corrupt schemes.

During his research, the reporter falls in love with Itsuko's younger and consumptive sister Mikako, and vows to marry her despite her illness.

Rentaro, a good-hearted man, but tending to outbursts of rage when confronted with what he considers immoral behaviour, verbally attacks Itsuko's husband during a meeting between the politician, Nakanuma and himself.

While Nakanuma and Rentarō make preparations to meet Itsuko and Mikako, Suzue realises that Nakanuma will never return the feelings she has for him, and moves out of their flat. Moments before the men arrive at the house of Mikako and her father, the young woman dies.

Rentarō, shattered by Mikako's death, scolds Nakanuma for his indifferent behaviour towards Suzue, shocking Itsuko with his unrestrained anger. Mikako's father, a former buddhist priest, performs a wedding ceremony for his deceased daughter and Rentarō. Nakanuma leaves after Itsuko declares that too much has happened for her to give in to anything more than a friendship.

== Cast ==
- Rentarō Mikuni as Rentarō Mikuni
- Masayuki Mori as Yoshiko Nakanuma
- Chikage Awashima as Itsuko Kitaura
- Yōko Katsuragi as Mikako Toba
- Chishū Ryū as Ryōen Toba
- Toshiko Kobayashi as Suzue
- Ryūji Kita as Kitaura's lawyer
