= Shinran: Path to Purity =

1987 film

- Film poster
- Directed by: Rentarō Mikuni
- Starring: Junkyu Moriyama
- Production companies: Shochiku; Nichiei; Cinema Tokyo
- Distributed by: Shochiku
- Release date: May 9, 1987 (Japan)
- Running time: 140 minutes
- Country: Japan
- Language: Japanese

Shinran: Path to Purity (Japanese: 親鸞 白い道, Hepburn: Shinran: Shiroi michi) is a 1987 Japanese drama film directed by Rentarō Mikuni, based on Mikuni's novel of the same name. The film follows the life and struggles of the Jodo Shinshu founder, Shinran, during the tumultuous Heian era. The film won the Jury Prize at the 1987 Cannes Film Festival. Shochiku released Shinran: Path to Purity on May 9, 1987, in Japan.

== Cast ==
- Junkyu Moriyama as Zenshin (Shinran)
- Michiyo Ookusu as Keishin, Shinran's wife
- Ako as Shiina
- Kazuo Andoh as Kazuto
- Sen Hara as Ayae
- Guts Ishimatsu as Atota
- Hanshiro Iwai as Sadaie Fujiwara
- Shigeru Izumiya as Hyu
- Hosei Komatsu as Utsunomiya
- Akaji Maro as Nanzame
- Mako Midori as Chiyo
- Rentarō Mikuni as Horai
- Junko Miyashita as Believer
- Sanae Nakahara as Woman at waiting
- Katsuo Nakamura as Biwa player
- Miki Odagiri as Woman at the field
- Eitaro Ozawa as Gyosen
- Frankie Sakai as Yorishige Inada
- Koji Shimizu
- Kantaro Suga as Zennen
- Tetsuro Tamba as Aketora
- Tomisaburo Wakayama as Homen
