= Tsuribaka Nisshi 19: Yokoso! Suzuki Kensetsu Goikko Sama =

- Directed by: Yūzō Asahara
- Starring: Toshiyuki Nishida; Miyoko Asada
- Release date: October 25, 2008
- Country: Japan
- Language: Japanese

Tsuribaka Nisshi 19: Yokoso! Suzuki Kensetsu Goikko Sama (釣りバカ日誌19 ようこそ!鈴木建設御一行様) is a 2008 Japanese film directed by Yūzō Asahara.
