= Nene: Onna Taikōki =

Nene: Onna Taikōki (寧々～おんな太閤記) is a television jidaigeki show in Japan. It was scheduled to be broadcast on TV Tokyo on January 2, 2009, from 2:00 p.m. to midnight.

Yukie Nakama portrays the lead character, Nene, and Kabuki actor Ichikawa Kamejirō II takes the part of Nene's husband, Toyotomi Hideyoshi. Hiroaki Murakami plays Oda Nobunaga, while Taizō Harada (Maeda Toshiie), Tomoko Tabata, Mari Hoshino, Kaori Takahashi, Shinobu Nakayama, Kimiko Ikegami, Yukiyo Toake, and Hideki Takahashi (Tokugawa Ieyasu) appear in various roles.

The show is the second in the Shinshun Wide Gekijō to have a female as the lead role. It features theme music by Masashi Sada and narration by Mitsuko Mori. The production is by TV Tokyo and Shochiku.
