= Seiji Hisamatsu =

Japanese film director (1912–1990)

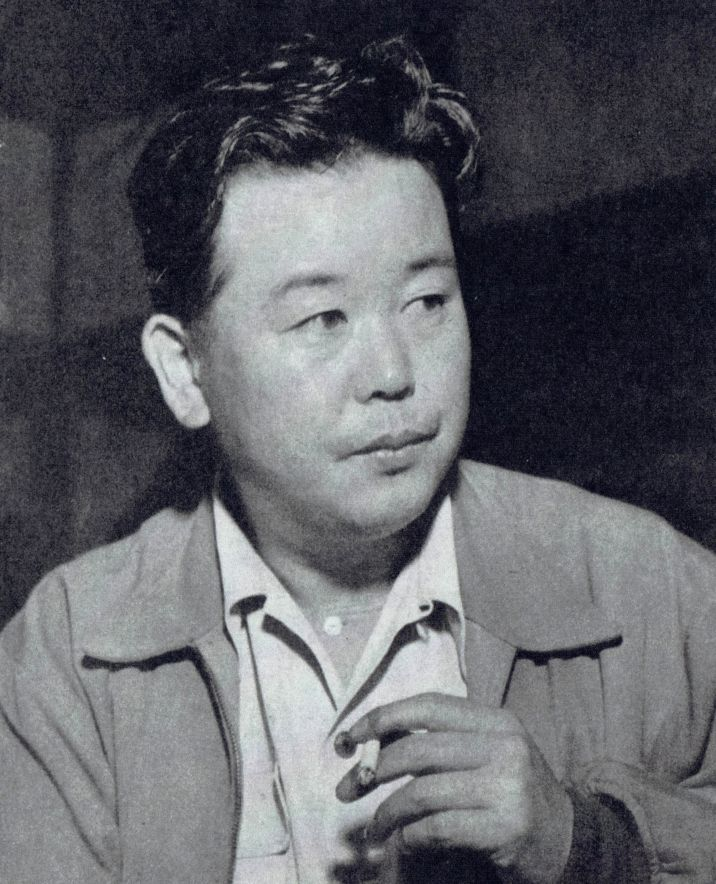
- Born: 20 February 1912; Ibaraki, Japan
- Died: 28 December 1990 (aged 78)
- Occupation: Film director
- Years active: 1934-1965

Seiji Hisamatsu (久松 静児, Hisamatsu Seiji) (20 February 1912 – 28 December 1990) was a Japanese film director. He directed 101 films between 1934 and 1965.

== Selected filmography ==
- Jūdai no Yūwaku (1953)
- Onna no Koyomi (1954)
- Keisatsu Nikki (1955)
