= My Sons =

- Theatrical poster for My Sons (1991)
- Directed by: Yōji Yamada
- Screenplay by: Yôji Yamada; Yoshitaka Asama
- Based on: 倉庫作業員 by Makoto Shiina
- Produced by: Nobuyoshi Ōtani
- Starring: Rentarō Mikuni; Masatoshi Nagase; Emi Wakui
- Cinematography: Tetsuo Takaba
- Edited by: Iwao Ishii
- Music by: Teizo Matsumura
- Distributed by: Shochiku
- Release date: October 12, 1991 (Japan)
- Running time: 121 minutes
- Country: Japan
- Language: Japanese

My Sons (Japanese: 息子, Hepburn: Musuko) is a 1991 Japanese film directed by Yōji Yamada. It was chosen as Best Film at the Japan Academy Prize ceremony.

== Synopsis ==
The children of old-fashioned patriarch of a family in Iwate Province gather to observe the first anniversary of their mother's death. Tetsuya, working as a bartender in Tokyo, quarrels with his father over the way he is leading his life.

== Cast ==
- Rentarō Mikuni: Akio Asano
- Masatoshi Nagase: Tetsuo
- Emi Wakui: Seiko Kawashima
- Miyoko Asada: Toshiko
- Kazuyo Asari: Ayako
- Mieko Harada: Reiko
- Chosuke Ikariya : Jirō Katō
- Leonard Kuma
- Tatsuo Matsumura: Terao
- Ken Nakamoto
- Meiko Nakamura
- Tomoko Naraoka
- Ichirō Ogura
- Mikiko Otonashi
- B-saku Satoh
- Casey Takamine
- Kunie Tanaka
- Ryuzo Tanaka: Tadashi

== Reception ==
=== Awards and nominations ===
15th Japan Academy Prize

- Won: Best Picture
- Won: Best Actor - Rentarō Mikuni
- Won: Best Supporting Actor - Masatoshi Nagase
- Won: Best Supporting Actress - Emi Wakui
- Won: Rookie of the Year - Masatoshi Nagase and Emi Wakui
- Nominated: Best Director - Yoji Yamada
- Nominated: Best Screenplay - Yoji Yamada and Yoshitaka Asama
- Nominated: Best Music - Teizo Matsumura
- Nominated: Best Cinematography - Tetsuo Takaba
- Nominated: Best Lighting Direction - Yoshifumi Aoki
- Nominated: Best Art Direction - Mitsuo Degawa
- Nominated: Best Sound Recording - Isao Suzuki and Ryuji Matsumoto
- Nominated: Best Film Editing - Iwao Ishii

16th Hochi Film Award

- Won: Best Film
- Won: Best Actor - Masatoshi Nagase
