= Ukare Gitsune Senbon Zakura =

1954 film

Ukare Gitsune Senbon Zakura (浮かれ狐千本桜; "The Playful Fox and the Thousand Cherry Trees") is a 1954 Japanese historical drama film directed by Torajirō Saitō. The title is derived from the kabuki Yoshitsune Senbon Zakura.

== Cast ==
- Takashi Wada as Minamoto no Yoshitsune
- Yumiko Hasegawa as Shizuka Gozen
- Kiiton Masuda as Musashibō Benkei
- Kin'ichi Shimizu as Kamei Rokurō
- Shin Morikawa as Suruga Jirō
- Junzaburō Ban as Satō Tadanobu (the fox)
- Chieko Naniwa as Otsuji
