= Miyoko Asada =

Japanese actress (born 1956)

- Born: February 15, 1956 (age 70); Tokyo, Japan
- Years active: 1973–present

Miyoko Asada (浅田 美代子, Asada Miyoko; born February 15, 1956) is a Japanese actress. She is a former pop idol.

== Biography ==
Miyoko Asada debuted as an idol in April 1973 with the single "Akai Fuusen" (The Red Balloon), which sold over 800,000 copies and peaked at #1 on the Japanese Oricon chart list. That same year she was nominated as Best Newcomer of the Year at the 15th Japan Record Awards, but lost the title to Junko Sakurada.

== Single discography ==
#	Title	Release date/chart position
1	Akai Fuusen (赤い風船); Debut single	1973-04-21 (#1)
2	Hitorikko Amaekko (ひとりっ子甘えっ子)	1973-07-21 (#10)
3	Watashino Yoimachigusa (わたしの宵待草)	1973-10-05 (#11)
4	Koha Shinju Iro (恋は真珠いろ)	1973-12-05 (#16)
5	Shiawaseno Ichiban Hoshi (しあわせの一番星)	1974-03-01 (#7)
6	Niji No Kakehashi (虹の架け橋)	1974-06-01 (#12)
7	Jaamatane (じゃあまたね)	1974-08-21 (#17)
8	Omoide No Kafe Terasu (想い出のカフェテラス)	1974-12-21 (#-)
9	Shoujo Koiuta (少女恋唄)	1975-03-01 (#-)
10	Kono Mune Nikono Kami Ni (この胸にこの髪に)	1975-10-21 (#-)
11	Dyuetto Kae Uta MEDLEY (デュエット替え唄メドレー)	1992-12-02 (#-)
12	Isshoninetsu (いっしょにねっ)	1994-12-16 (#-)

== Filmography ==
=== Film ===
- Hi no Ataru Sakamichi (1975)
- My Sons (1991)
- Tsuribaka Nisshi 7 (1994)
- Tsuribaka Misshi 8 (1996)
- Tsuribaka Nisshi 9 (1997)
- Tsuribaka Nisshi 10 (1998)
- Tsuribaka Nisshi Eleven (2000)
- Hashire! Ichiro (2001)
- Tsuribaka Nisshi 12: Shijo Saidai no Kyuka (2001)
- Tsuribaka Nisshi 13: Hama-chan kiki Ippatsu! (2002)
- Tsuribaka Nisshi 14 (2003)
- Tsuribaka Nisshi 15: Hama-chan ni asu wa nai? (2004)
- Gin no enzeru (2004)
- Tsuribaka Nisshi 16 (2005)
- Saga no Gabai-baachan (2006)
- Tsuribaka Nisshi 17 (2006)
- Otoshimono (2006)
- Red Whale, White Snake (2006)
- Ai no Rukeichi (2007)
- Sweet Bean (2015)
- Running Again (2018)
- Erica 38 (2019)
- True Mothers (2020)
- The Dignified Death of Shizuo Yamanaka (2020)
- Independence of Japan (2020)
- Everything Will Be Owlright! (2022)
- Bridal, My Song (2022)
- Twilight Cinema Blues (2023)
- Trapped Balloon (2023)
- Ai no Komuragaeri (2023)
- Kyrie (2023)
- The Gate of Murder (2027), Fusae Kawamoto

=== Television ===
- 101st Marriage Proposal (1991)
- Sakura (2002)
- Shinsengumi! (2004), Satō Nobu
- Nyokei Kazoku (2005)
- Jigoku no Sata mo Yome Shidai (2007)
- Tokyo Tower (2007)
- Fūrin Kazan (2007)
- Wachigaiya Itosato (2007)
- Otokomae! (2008)
- Keikan no Chi (2009)
- Hanako and Anne (2014)
- Shiroi Kyotō (2019)
- Anpan (2025), Kura Asada
