= The Silk Road (1988 film) =

- VHS cover art
- Directed by: Junya Satō
- Written by: Junya Satō; Takeshi Yoshida
- Based on: Tun-Huang by Yasushi Inoue
- Produced by: Kazuo Haruna; Atsushi Takeda; Yoshihiro Yûki
- Starring: Toshiyuki Nishida; Kōichi Satō; Anna Nakagawa; Tsunehiko Watase; Takahiro Tamura
- Cinematography: Akira Shiizuka
- Edited by: Akira Suzuki
- Music by: Masaru Sato
- Distributed by: Toho
- Release date: June 25, 1988 (Japan)
- Running time: 143 minutes
- Country: Japan
- Language: Japanese
- Box office: ¥8.2 billion (Japan) $123,959 (USA)

The Silk Road (Japanese: 敦煌, Hepburn: Tonkō), also known as Dun-Huang, is a 1988 Japanese epic historical drama film directed by Junya Satō. It was adapted from the 1959 novel Tun-Huang by Yasushi Inoue. The plotline centers around the Mogao Caves, a Buddhist manuscript trove in Dunhuang, Western China, located along the Silk Road during the Song dynasty in the 11th century.

The film was released in Japan and China on June 25, 1988. It was chosen as Best Film at the 12th Japan Academy Prize ceremony. It is the 48th-highest-grossing Japanese film of all time.

== Cast ==
- Toshiyuki Nishida as Zhu Wangli, a commander of the Xi Xia empire
- Kōichi Satō as Zhao Xingde, a student of Zhu Wangli
- Anna Nakagawa as Tsurpia, a princess of a Uyghur kingdom
- Tsunehiko Watase as Li Yuanhao, the Xi Xia emperor
- Takahiro Tamura as Tsao Yanhui

== Reception ==
The Silk Road was the number one Japanese film on the domestic market in 1988, earning ¥4.5 billion in distribution income that year. It was the third highest-grossing Japanese film up until then, after Antarctica and The Adventures of Milo and Otis, and remains one of the highest-grossing Japanese films. As of 2013, the film has grossed a total of ¥8.2 billion in Japan. In the United States, it grossed $123,959.

== See also ==
- List of historical drama films of Asia

== Bibliography ==
- 敦煌 (in Japanese). Japanese Movie Database.
- "TON KO". Complete Index to World Film.
- 敦煌 (in Japanese). walkerplus.com.
- 敦煌(1988) (in Japanese). allcinema.net.
- "Variety Japan" 敦煌 (in Japanese). Variety Japan.
