= Rikyu (film) =

Rikyū
- DVD cover art
- Directed by: Hiroshi Teshigahara
- Written by: Genpei Akasegawa; Hiroshi Teshigahara
- Based on: Hideyoshi to Rikyu by Yaeko Nogami
- Starring: Rentarō Mikuni; Tsutomu Yamazaki; Yoshiko Mita; Matsumoto Kōshirō IX; Nakamura Kichiemon II
- Cinematography: Fujio Morita
- Edited by: Toshio Taniguchi
- Music by: Tōru Takemitsu
- Distributed by: Shochiku (JPN); Capitol Films (USA)
- Release date: 15 September 1989 (Japan)
- Running time: 135 minutes
- Country: Japan
- Language: Japanese

Rikyu (Japanese: 利休, Hepburn: Rikyū) is a 1989 Japanese drama film about Sen no Rikyū, a 16th-century master of the Japanese tea ceremony, directed by Hiroshi Teshigahara. The film was adapted from the novel Hideyoshi to Rikyu by Yaeko Nogami. The film was ranked the 7th best film of the year by Kinema Junpo in 1989. It was one of two major biographical drama films directed in 1989 about the life of Sen no Rikyū, the other being Death of a Tea Master by Kei Kumai. Rikyu was selected as the Japanese entry for the Best Foreign Language Film at the 62nd Academy Awards but was not accepted as a nominee.

== Synopsis ==
The film focuses on the late stages of life of Rikyū, during the highly turbulent Sengoku period of feudal Japan. It starts near the end of Oda Nobunaga's reign, with Rikyū serving as tea master to Nobunaga, and continues into the Momoyama Period. Rikyū is portrayed as a man thoroughly dedicated to aesthetics and perfection, especially in relation to the art of tea. While serving as tea master to the new ruler Toyotomi Hideyoshi, Rikyū finds himself in a uniquely privileged position, with constant access to the powerful feudal lord and the theoretical ability to influence policy, yet he studiously avoids deep involvement in politics while attempting to focus his full attention to the study and teachings of the way of tea. To the extent that he expresses himself, he does so diplomatically, in a way to avoid disrupting the harmony of his relationship with Hideyoshi. Yet, as society is changed violently and radically around him, also finding himself the focus of jealousy and misdirected suspicions, Rikyū ultimately can not avoid confronting larger social issues. He is compelled to express an opinion on Hideyoshi's military plans. This one breach of his studied isolation from world affairs leads quickly to tragic consequences. The closing scene shows Rikyū, entering a bamboo forest at night alone amid an electrical storm. Subtitles inform the viewer that he committed ritual Seppuku in 1592, presumably on this night.

== Background ==
Director Teshigahara, himself a master and teacher of the Japanese traditional art of ikebana, brings the viewer into appreciation and deep sympathy for Rikyu's aesthetic idealism and his careful diplomatic efforts to avoid excessive entanglement in political affairs. The film itself is very studied in its aestheticism, and very expressive of the shocking force of life intruding into the guarded hermetic space of the artist/idealist.

== Cast ==
- Rentarō Mikuni as Sen no Rikyū
- Tsutomu Yamazaki as Toyotomi Hideyoshi
- Yoshiko Mita as Riki
- Matsumoto Kōshirō IX as Oda Nobunaga
- Nakamura Kichiemon II as Tokugawa Ieyasu
- Ryō Tamura as Toyotomi Hidenaga
- Kyōko Kishida as Nene
- Tanie Kitabayashi as Ōmandokoro
- Sayoko Yamaguchi as Cha-cha
- Bandō Mitsugorō X as Ishida Mitsunari
- Junkichi Orimoto as Imai Sōkyū
- Hisashi Igawa as Yamanoue Sōji
- Donald Richie as Gaspar Coelho
- Kyoko Enami as Chika

== Other credits ==
- Yoshinobu Nishioka - Art director
- Keiji Mitsutomo - Assistant director

== Awards ==
Rentarō Mikuni won the Best Actor Award of the Japanese Academy for his role in this film (he also won for Tsuribaka Nisshi in the same year). In addition, Mikuni won four other Japanese acting awards for the role.

Tōru Takemitsu won the Japanese Academy Award for Best Musical Score for his work on the film. Director Hiroshi Teshigahara won awards from the Berlin International Film Festival, and the Montreal World Film Festival. The film was selected as the Japanese entry for the Best Foreign Language Film at the 62nd Academy Awards, but was not accepted as a nominee.

== See also ==
- Cinema of Japan
- List of submissions to the 62nd Academy Awards for Best Foreign Language Film
- List of Japanese submissions for the Academy Award for Best Foreign Language Film
