= A Fugitive from the Past =

1965 Japanese film

- Directed by: Tomu Uchida
- Screenplay by: Naoyuki Suzuki
- Based on: Kiga Kaikyō by Tsutomu Minakami
- Produced by: Kimiharu Tsujino; Hisashi Yabe; Seiichi Yoshino
- Starring: Rentarō Mikuni; Sachiko Hidari; Ken Takakura; Junzaburō Ban
- Cinematography: Hanjiro Nakazawa
- Edited by: Yoshiki Nagasawa
- Music by: Isao Tomita
- Production company: Toei Company
- Distributed by: Toei Company
- Release date: 15 January 1965 (Japan)
- Running time: 183 minutes
- Country: Japan
- Language: Japanese

A Fugitive from the Past (Japanese: 飢餓海峡, Hepburn: Kiga Kaikyō; lit. 'Straits of Hunger' or 'Hunger Straits') is a 1965 Japanese crime drama film directed by Tomu Uchida and starring Rentarō Mikuni, Sachiko Hidari, Ken Takakura and Junzaburō Ban. It was written by Naoyuki Suzuki based on the 1963 novel Kiga Kaikyō by Tsutomu Minakami.

== Plot ==
In 1947, two ex-convicts on parole murder pawnbroker Sasada and his family in Iwanai, Hokkaido, take his money and set fire to the house to cover their tracks. They escape together with a third man, Takichi Inukai, to Shimokita Peninsula during a typhoon. The murderers' dead bodies later wash up on the shore after a ferry sinks, but policeman Yumisaka becomes suspicious because they are not listed as passengers. He believes that the missing Inukai killed his two accomplices while crossing the Tsugaru Strait, which separates the two islands. Meanwhile, Inukai is sheltered in Ominato by a prostitute, Yae Sugito, and gives her a large sum of money in return, which enables her to start a new life. When Yumisaka questions Yae, she lies and claims that the customer was not Inukai. The detective follows Yae to Tokyo, where he loses her trace.

10 years later, Yae, who returned to working as a prostitute in a brothel, recognises Inukai in a newspaper article. He now lives as a respectable citizen in Maizuru under his real name Kyoichiro Tarumi, who received press coverage for donating money to reintegrate former criminals. She visits him to thank him for his help ten years ago, but he pretends not to know her or having heard the name Inukai before. When she identifies him by his crippled thumb, he kills her in panic. He then strangles his servant Takenaka, who had surprised Inukai kneeling over Yae's body, and disposes of the corpses in the sea.

When Yae's and Takenaka's bodies are found, detective Ajimura rejects his colleague's notion of a shinjū, instead suspecting a crime because of Yae's broken neck. Yae's father tells Ajimura that ten years ago a policeman named Yumisaka had questioned him in search of a man whom his daughter had met. Ajimura contacts Yumisaka, who was forced to resign from the police force because of his obsession with the case, for help. In a series of interrogations, Inukai finally admits that he kept Sasada's money as a means to escape his life in poverty, but denies having been involved in the murders themselves. Knowing that the police have no evidence against him, he insists that he will only speak about Yae when the police believe his story up to this point.

In the evening, Yumisaka visits Inukai in his cell and presents him the ashes of the boat which Inukai had burned after his crossing of the Tsugaru Strait. Yumisaka, who had kept the ashes through all these years, declares that he despises Inukai for the killing of Yae who herself would never have betrayed him. The agitated Inukai begs Yumisaka and the police officers to take him to his native Hokkaido one more time, to which they agree. When the ferry passes Yae's hometown on Shimokita, Inukai jumps overboard and does not surface.

== Cast ==
- Rentarō Mikuni – Takichi Inukai / Kyoichiro Tarumi
- Sachiko Hidari – Yae Sugito / Chizuru
- Ken Takakura – Detective Ajimura
- Junzaburō Ban – Detective Yumisaka
- Kōji Mitsui – Motojima, the Tokyo brothel owner
- Yoshi Katō – Yae's father
- Sadako Sawamura – Motojima's wife
- Susumu Fujita – Maizuru police chief
- Nobuo Yana – Machida
- Rinichi Yamamoto – Monk
- Akiko Kazami – Toshiko, Tarumi's wife

== Production ==
Shigeru Okata, chairman of Toei's Tokyo studio, suggested Tomu Uchida, who had expressed a desire to explore more contemporary subject matter, adapt Tsutomu Minakami's 1963 detective novel Kiga Kaikyō. (Note: Kiga Kaikyō began serialization in Shūkan Asahi in 1962, but was incomplete until being published in book form in 1963.) However, Okata was then transferred to Toei's Kyoto studio, thus, new Toei Tokyo chairman Kimiharu Tsujino took over the project. Naoyuki Suzuki was chosen to write the script and Uchida's son, Yusaku, oversaw production, which began in May 1964.

Rentarō Mikuni was cast as Kyoichiro Tarumi, and Sachiko Hidari plays Yae Sugito, a role Toei initially considered Yoshiko Sakuma for. Isamu Kosugi was initially set to play Detective Yumisaka, but dropped out due to scheduling conflicts. Comedian Junzaburō Ban, not known for dramatic roles, got the part largely due to his Tōhoku accent.

Shooting was planned to last from summer to autumn. But the night scene depicting the capsizing of the ferry, which utilized over 500 extras and a large number of cars, was delayed for days because, as Inuhiko Yomota wrote, "a typhoon failed to conveniently strike". The crew became frustrated and Uchida grew irritated and depressed. Filming ran two weeks behind schedule, concluding at the end of October 1964. Meanwhile, a labor dispute at Toei saw producer Kimiharu Tsujino replaced by Chiaki Imada. These delays ruined the plan to have the film's premiere at the Agency for Cultural Affairs' annual National Arts Festival that November.

To achieve a grainy effect on the images, A Fugitive from the Past was shot on 16 mm film, blown up to 35 mm and the film material manipulated. According to filmmaker Ryota Nakanishi, Uchida, aided by cinematographer Hanjiro Nakazawa, used three different techniques. The blow-up and trim method, where footage is expanded to 25 to 30 times its original size, the relief method, which juxtaposes positive and negative versions of the same image, and the Sabatier method, where light and dark values are reversed. Uchida dubbed the process the "W106 Method", or the "Wide 106 Method", and convinced Toei president Hiroshi Okawa that it would save money.

== Release ==
A Fugitive from the Past was previewed on 27 December 1964. According to assistant director Koji Ota, the preview cut shown at the All Rush Film Festival ran 192 minutes. After the preview, producer Imada asked Uchida to shorten the film, but the director refused. Imada then ordered Ota to do it, and the assistant director reluctantly cut 25 minutes. Reports of this dispute were printed in the press and Uchida stated he wanted his name removed from the film. However, Toei president Hiroshi Okawa compromised with the director, and half of the cut material was restored. The film was officially released on 15 January 1965 as part of a double bill with Koji Ohta's Ano Kumo ni Utaō. The "restored version" which runs 183 minutes was only shown at four Tokyo theaters, the rest of the country saw Ota's 167 minute cut. However, after the film became successful, Toei would use the 183 minute cut for revival screenings. The incident prompted Uchida's December 1965 departure from Toei, although he later returned to the company to direct Jinsei Gekijō: Hishakaku to Kiratsune (1968).

A fourth variant of A Fugitive from the Past has been released on home video. Known as the "French" version, it runs 175 minutes. Arrow Films released the 183 minute cut on Blu-ray in the United Kingdom and North America on 27 September 2022.

== Awards and reception ==
A Fugitive from the Past ranked #5 on Kinema Junpo's list of the ten best Japanese films of the year. It received the Blue Ribbon Award for Best Screenplay and the Mainichi Film Award for Best Director, Best Screenplay, Best Actor (Rentarō Mikuni), Best Actress (Sachiko Hidari) and Best Supporting Actor (Junzaburō Ban).

Budd Wilkins of Slant Magazine gave the film four out of five stars and described it as a "sprawling saga of crime and punishment" set against the backdrop of postwar Japan that is widely considered Tomu Uchida's masterpiece. In a review for Blueprint: Review, David Brook called A Fugitive from the Past a "subtly rich and masterfully crafted film that takes well-worn crime/mystery-thriller plot points and weaves them into a deep, emotionally and morally complex tale". He gave the film 4.5 stars out of five and said it reminded him of High and Low.

== Legacy ==
A Fugitive from the Past was screened at the Berkeley Art Museum and Pacific Film Archive in 2007 and in the Museum of Modern Art in 2016 as part of retrospectives on Tomu Uchida.

The film was included in Kinema Junpo's "critics top 200" list and in the British Film Institute's "The best Japanese film of every year – from 1925 to now" list.
