= Tsuribaka Nisshi 2 =

Tsuribaka Nisshi

Japanese name
- Kanji: 釣りバカ日誌
- Kana: つりバカにっし
- Directed by: Tomio Kuriyama
- Produced by: Shizuo Yamanouchi
- Starring: Toshiyuki Nishida; Rentarō Mikuni
- Cinematography: Kōsuke Yasuda
- Music by: Joe Hisaishi
- Distributed by: Shochiku
- Release date: 30 September 1989
- Running time: 96 minutes
- Country: Japan
- Language: Japanese

Tsuribaka Nisshi 2 (釣りバカ日誌 2) is a 1989 Japanese film directed by Tomio Kuriyama. It was released on 30 September 1989. It is the second film in the Tsuribaka Nisshi series. In the film, a devoted fisherman and his company's president strengthen their unlikely friendship while navigating work, health concerns and comic misadventures on and off the water.
