= Yukiyo Toake =

Japanese actress (born 1942)

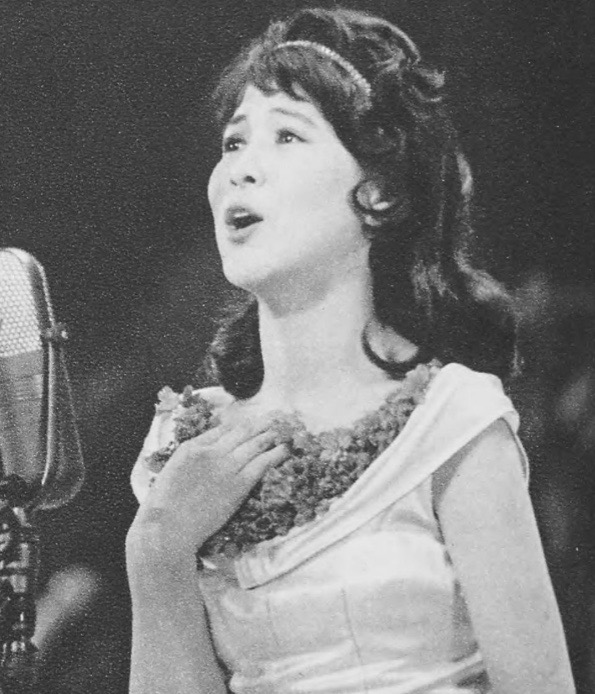
- Movie Pictorial, March 1962
- Born: November 23, 1942 (age 83); Tokyo City, Japan
- Occupation: Actress
- Years active: 1958–present

Yukiyo Toake (十朱幸代, Toake Yukiyo) is a Japanese actress. She won the award for best actress at the 23rd Blue Ribbon Awards for Furueru Shita and at the 29th for Gray Sunset.

== Filmography ==
=== Film ===
- 1974 - Tora-san's Lullaby
- 1980 - Furueru Shita
- 1983 - The Catch
- 1985 - Gray Sunset
- 1985 - Oar
- 1987 - River of Fireflies
- 1989 - Shaso
- 1991 - Edo Jō Tairan

=== Television ===
- 1978 - Ōgon no Hibi (Kita no mandokoro)
- 2001 - Hōjō Tokimune (Kakusan-ni)
- 2009 - Nene: Onna Taikōki (Naka)
- 2011 - Carnation (Sadako Matsuzaka)
- 2013 - The Partner (Machi Kinoshita)

== Honours ==
- Kinuyo Tanaka Award (1989)
- Medal with Purple Ribbon (2003)
- Order of the Rising Sun, 4th Class, Gold Rays with Rosette (2013)
