= Rentarō Mikuni =

Japanese actor (1923–2013)

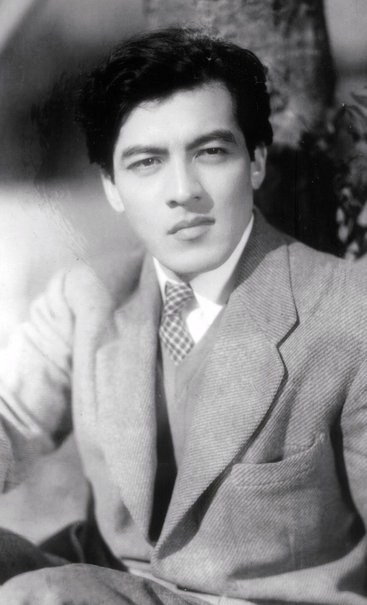
- Mikuni, c. 1950s
- Born: Masao Sato; 20 January 1923; Ōta, Gunma, Empire of Japan
- Died: 14 April 2013 (aged 90); Inagi, Tokyo, Japan
- Occupations: Actor, film director
- Years active: 1950–2013
- Children: Kōichi Satō
- Relatives: Kanichiro (grandson)

Rentarō Mikuni (Japanese: 三國連太郎, Hepburn: Mikuni Rentarō; 20 January 1923 – 14 April 2013) was a Japanese actor and film director. He starred in several films of Keisuke Kinoshita, Mikio Naruse, Tadashi Imai, Shōhei Imamura, Tomu Uchida and many others. Mikuni received numerous awards for his performances and was awarded the Jury Prize at the 1987 Cannes Film Festival for his film Shinran: Path to Purity, which he wrote and directed.

== Early years ==
Mikuni's parents met in October 1922 at the port of Numazu. His mother had been a maid in Kure, but had been laid off and was on her way home. His father was working in Ōta, Gunma, and was on his way home. They hit it off so well that they did not return to their parents' home, but got married and began to live at Mikuni's father's residence. Mikuni was born there in January 1923. His real name was Masao Sato (佐藤政雄, Satō Masao). Although Mikuni was his father's biological son on the family register, he said he was probably the child of another man and that his father was adoptive father. The reason for this was that the time between the meeting of the parents and the birth was too short. (Note: Mikuni himself never explicitly questioned his parents about this.) When he was seven months old, the family moved to his father's hometown, Nishiizu, Shizuoka Prefecture, where he grew up. Mikuni's father was an electrician, only graduated from primary school, so he wanted his son to have an education, so he sent Mikuni to former Touyou Middle School (later Shimoda High School in Shizuoka Prefecture).

But Mikuni lost interest in education of middle school because he was disgusted by teachers discriminating against students based on their parents' occupations and the military education that took place in schools. His father was furious and beat him because he skipped school and spent every day wandering around aimlessly. One day when he was 14 years old, his father found him sleeping under the porch of the house and severely beat him with a clothes pole, so he ran away from home. He left middle school in the second grade. After running away from home, Mikuni hid in the hold of a ship docked in Shimoda, Shizuoka and crossed over to Qingdao, China (then under Japanese control). He was found on the way, but he could not turn back, so he continued to work as a temporary cabin boy on the ship. After landing in Qingdao, he wandered around, working in lunchbox shops and dance halls under false pretenses of age, and then wandered through Manchuria and the Korean Peninsula (then under Japanese control). Later, at the age of 16, he returned to Japan on the ferry from Busan.

=== Draft evasion and the Chinese front ===
In 1941, the Pacific War began, and he eventually received a draft card when he was 20. However, he refused to be drafted because he did not want to kill anyone or die in the war. He fled with his girlfriend to Karatsu, Saga, and was thinking of crossing the ocean to the continent when he was arrested by Special Higher Police. This was because his mother, fearing that her village would be ostracized, reported him to police. He was sent to the front in China in December 1943. In combat, he witnessed the death of many of his comrades and was himself wounded by a bullet piercing his armpit. However, he finally did not fire a single shot because he did not want to be part of the killing spree. Regarding his lethargic attitude, his superiors tried to correct him by beating, but he wouldn't listen no matter how much they beat him. Eventually, he pretended to be sick and worked as a medic or tended to horses in the rear, where he remained until the end of the war. The 34th Infantry Regiment in Shizuoka, where he belonged, had more than 1,000 men at the time of his deployment, but only thirty-odd survived after the war. The war ended in August 1945 when he was in Hankou, and returned Japan in June 1946.

=== Return to Japan and debut as an actor ===
After returning to Japan, he wandered around Japan, working as a bus driver and peddler of laundry soap, miso, and other products. There are several stories as to how he made his debut, (Note: Mikuni tended to tell a mixture of truth and falsehood to amuse his audience, so the details of his stories vary slightly from interview to interview, so the facts are not known.) but it is generally believed to be as follows. While living in Tottori, Mikuni had taken a picture at a photo studio in Kurayoshi, Tottori. The owner of the studio had taken the liberty of submitting it to Shochiku's advertisement for new actors. Then in December 1950, a Shochiku producer, who had seen Mikuni's picture, happened to find Mikuni in Higashi-Ginza and scouted him. When he was scouted as an actor, he thought he would do any job as long as he could eat.

== Career ==
=== 1951 debut ===
He made his debut as the lead role of a newspaper reporter in the film The Good Fairy, directed by Keisuke Kinoshita. Originally, Eiji Okada was scheduled to play the lead role, but his appearance was cancelled due to the Red Purge, and Mikuni was selected because he had a similar facial appearance. The stage name Rentaro Mikuni was taken from his role in this film. At the time of his debut, Mikuni's career was falsified and he was advertised as an intellectual and single male with a degree in engineering from Osaka University. (Note: In reality, he was a middle school dropout and had a wife and children at that time.) This degree of falsehood was common in the movie industry at the time. Mikuni soon became popular as a beautiful features, handsome actor, mainly among young women. For his performance in this film, he won the 2nd Blue Ribbon Award for Best Newcomer. Mikuni was favored by director Kinoshita and lived in his house for a while as a houseboy. He then became a research student at Haiyuza Theatre Company for some time in order to acquire acting skills. The following year, he continued to appear in Kinoshita's films Boyhood and Fireworks over the Sea.

=== Do not enter the dog, cat, or Mikuni ===
Mikuni was free-spirited and disliked being bound by contracts. At that time, it was common for star actors to sign exclusive contracts with movie companies and not appear in other companies' films in Japan. In 1952, Toho made a formal request to Shochiku to cast Mikuni as Toshiro Mifune's co-star in Sword for Hire, but Shochiku refused, in part because Mikuni was their employee. However, Mikuni, attracted by the high fee, appeared the film. Shochiku and Mikuni got into trouble over this issue, and Mikuni was fired from Shochiku. In 1954, he appeared in the Nikkatsu film Muddy Youth over Toho's objections. This incident led to Mikuni being designated as the first actor to violate Five-Company Agreement, which prohibits the drawing of actors between the five major film companies. It is said that a sign saying "Do not enter the dog, cat, or Mikuni" was attached to the gate of the Shochiku Ōfuna Studio in Kamakura. After that, Mikuni worked mainly in independent films and Nikkatsu, which did not participate in the five-company agreement. The 1956 Nikkatsu film The Burmese Harp, directed by Kon Ichikawa, and the 1957 independent film Stepbrothers, both of which he appeared in during this period, later became among his best-known works. In October 1956, his contract with Nikkatsu expired and he became a freelancer. In 1959, he signed an exclusive contract with Toei while maintaining his freedom to perform for other companies, which was unusual at the time.

=== Became one of Japan's leading film stars ===
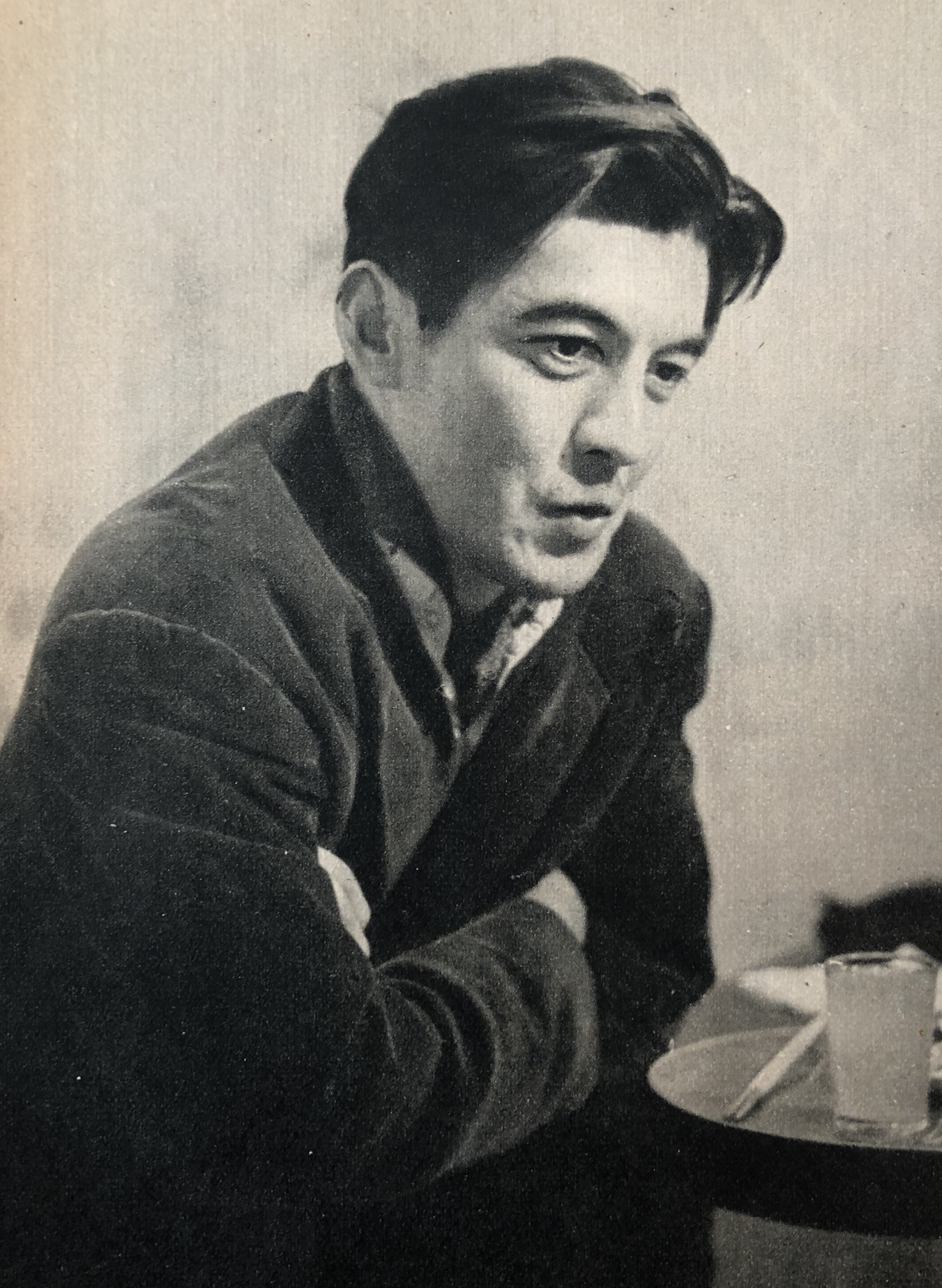
Mikuni in 1954

After that, Mikuni appeared in a number of films in both leading and supporting roles, and won numerous awards and honors. In 1960, he won the Blue Ribbon Award for Best Actor for his role in The Great Journey (大いなる旅路), which chronicled the life of a Japanese National Railways engineer and his family over a thirty-year period. In 1965, he won Mainichi Film Awards for Best Actor for A Fugitive from the Past, in which he played a man who commits a series of murders amidst extreme poverty. In 1979, he won the Blue Ribbon Award for Best Supporting Actor for his portrayal of a devout Christian man who is the father of a serial killer in Vengeance is Mine. He became the first individual actor to win three Blue Ribbon Awards, and was called one of the most talented movie stars of the Shōwa era. The Tsuribaka nisshi series began in 1988, The humorous interaction between Su-san, the company president played by Mikuni, and Hama-chan, a useless employee played by Toshiyuki Nishida, gained national popularity, and the series continued until the 22nd film, Tsuribaka Nisshi 20: Final, released in 2009. He and his son, Koichi Sato, first co-starred in the 1986 film A Promise, and played father and son in the 1996 film adaptation of Oishinbo, and also co-starred in the 2011 film Someday. His last film was Chronicle of My Mother, released in 2012, and he appeared in 183 films during his lifetime.

He also worked as a film director. In 1963, he established Nippon Productions and shot Typhoon (台風) as his first independent film, but it was not released due to opposition from Toei, with whom he had an exclusive contract at the time. In 1969, he founded the production company A.P.C. and in 1972 he produced, wrote, directed, and starred in River Without a Shore (岸辺なき河), which was shot in the deserts of Pakistan and Afghanistan, but was not completed. Finally, in 1987, he directed his own film adaptation of Shinran: Path to Purity, the novel he wrote and won Jury Prize of the 40th Cannes Film Festival.

He was also a talented calligrapher and painter. Mikuni had a deep knowledge of Buddhism and published several books, especially on Shinran.

He received Medal with Purple Ribbon in recognition of his outstanding achievements in the field of art and culture in 1984, Order of the Rising Sun, Gold Rays with Rosette (4th class) in 1993.

== Preparing for a role ==
Mikuni was known for his serious preparation for his roles. In Stepbrothers, he pulled out his upper and lower 10 teeth in order to play the role of an old man. This was done in order to play the role of a married couple with an much elder Kinuyo Tanaka in a naturalistic manner. In the scene where he beats Ineko Arima, the actress who plays a wife who had committed adultery in Night Drum, he seriously beat her from the test and hit her more than 20 times until the director gives his permission in the production, causing Arima's face to swell up.

Yoshio Shirai, a film critic and former editor-in-chief of Kinema Junpo, cited that Mikuni had prepared in his roles so thoroughly that he sometimes tended to overact, and needed a director who could control this well. Shirai said that the combination with director Tomu Uchida was the best, and that Uchida's A Fugitive from the Past was his best work. In Kon Ichikawa's The Burmese Harp, Mikuni's overacting was truncated in order to make the most of his natural acting. In Miyoji Ieki's Stepbrothers, Mikuni's preparation in his role was tremendous, but he analyzes that the director is a man with a strong policy, so he made excellent use of his unusual emotions as an actor. On the other hand, he says that the range of Mikuni's acting ability is overwhelming when looking at his droll performance seen in the Tsuribaka Nisshi series.

== Personal life ==
He was uninhibited in his relationships with women throughout his life. He was married four times. He disliked being tied down to one woman and left her as soon as he lost his passion for her, because it would narrow his horizons and interfere with his work as an actor.

His first marriage was a sham marriage in April 1946 in China because he had heard a rumor that married people could return to Japan earlier. After returning to Japan, he lived in Miyazaki Prefecture with this woman and had a child, but they divorced in 1948. His second marriage was to a woman he met while living in Kurayoshi, Tottori, while working as a peddler, but divorced at the end of 1952. His third marriage was to a woman who was a geisha in Kagurazaka, Tokyo in 1953. During this marriage, in 1963, he had an affair with Kiwako Taichi, an actress 20 years younger than him. He lived with Taichi at her parents' house for a time. After months, he began to feel burdened by Taichi's passion and left her giving her a letter to say he was tired. He and his wife officially divorced in 1972. He gave most of his property to his wife and set off on a wandering journey to the Middle East. His fourth marriage was to a noncelebrity, 27 years younger than him in 1976. He was older than her parents, and her grandmother, who knew of his history of his love affairs, was vehemently opposed to the marriage, but he lived with her until the end of his life.

During his third marriage he had a son, Koichi Sato, who later became an actor. Sato's son and Mikuni's grandson, Kanichiro, also made his acting debut in 2017 after Mikuni's passing. Mikuni, who lived a free-spirited life, was said to have been feuding with his son Sato for many years. However, after the birth of his grandson Kanichiro, Mikuni doted on him so much that his relationship with his son was said to have improved. Mikuni once said of his grandson Kanichiro that he was not suited to be an actor because he grew up being loved.

In his later years, he lived in Numazu, traveling back and forth from Tokyo. He loved this place where he could see Suruga Bay and Mount Fuji, and spent his later years walking and tending to his garden.

=== Death ===
In his final years, his health failed and he was hospitalized. Mikuni died in Tokyo on 14 April 2013 of acute heart failure (Note: Some reports say acute respiratory failure.) at the age of 90. As per Mikuni's wishes, the funeral was held in secret with only relatives and related persons. Mikuni wished to have his ashes scattered after his death, but his son, Koichi Sato, placed them in the Sato family grave, which had existed for a long time at a temple in Matsuzaki, Shizuoka. This was Sato's wish, as he had not been able to live with his father for a long time before his death.

== Filmography (selected) ==
=== Film ===
- The Good Fairy (1951)
- Husband and Wife (1953)
- Samurai I : Musashi Miyamoto (1954)
- Keisatsu Nikki (1955)
- A Hole of My Own Making (1955)
- The Burmese Harp (1956)
- Ryūri no Kishi (1956)
- Stepbrothers (1957)
- Night Drum (1958)
- Ballad of the Cart (1959)
- Kiku to Isamu (1959)
- The Catch (1961)
- Harakiri (1962) as Saitō Kageyu
- Wolves, Pigs and Men (1964)
- Kwaidan (1965)
- A Fugitive from the Past (1965)
- The Threat (1966) as Misawa
- Zatoichi the Outlaw (1967)
- The Profound Desire of the Gods (1968)
- Confessions Among Actresses (1971) as Minakawa
- Tabi no Omosa (1972)
- Coup d'État (1973) as Ikki Kita
- Himiko (1974)
- Two in the Amsterdam Rain (1975)
- Kiri-no-Hata (1977)
- Mount Hakkoda (1977)
- Never Give Up (1978)
- Vengeance is Mine (1979)
- Ah! Nomugi Toge (1979)
- Sailor Suit and Machine Gun (1981)
- The Go Masters (1982)
- A Promise (1986)
- Shinran: Path to Purity (director, 1987)
- A Taxing Woman's Return (1988)
- Tsuribaka Nisshi (1988)
- Wuthering Heights (1988)
- Rikyu (1989) as Sen no Rikyū
- Tsuribaka Nisshi 2 (1989)
- Tsuribaka Nisshi 3 (1990)
- Tsuribaka Nisshi 4 (1991)
- Musuko (1991)
- Luminous Moss (1992)
- Tsuribaka Nisshi 6 (1993)
- Daibyonin (1993)
- Tsuribaka Nisshi 7 (1994)
- Mitabi no Kaikyō (1995)
- Oishinbo (1996), Yūzan Kaibara
- Will to Live (1999)
- Taiga no Itteki (2001)
- The Wind Carpet (2003)
- Chronicle of My Mother (2012)

=== Television ===
- Hissatsu Shikakenin (1972) – episode 6
- Akai Unmei (1976)
- The Women of Osaka Castle (1983), Toyotomi Hideyoshi
- Sekigahara (1981), Honda Masanobu

== Books ==
- The White Path: Hōnen, Shinran and Their Times (Mainichi Shimbun, 1982 / paperback: Kodansha, 1986, ISBN 4061838903)
- Shinran (Hozokan, 1987, ISBN 4831880337)
- Waga Bonnō no Hi wa Moete: Shinran e Itaru Michi (Kobunsha, 1984, ISBN 4334004148)
- Shinran ni Itaru Michi (Kobunsha, 1987, ISBN 4334004148)
- A Letter to Actor X-kun (Akashi Shoten, 1985, ISBN 4750300748)
- How to Live and How to Die (KK Long Sellers, 2006, ISBN 4845420716)
- Shinran to Shinran: A Gaze into Modern Civilization (Fujiwara Shoten, 1990, ISBN 4894349175) Conversation and Dialogue with Hiroshi Noma
- The Depths of "Entertainment and Discrimination" (Kaihou Shuppansha, 1997 / Chikuma Shobō, 2005, ISBN 4480420894) Conversation and dialogue with sociologist Kazumitsu Okiura
- Living in the Wind Craze (Iwanami Shoten, 1999, ISBN 4000028774). Co-author with Yang Sok-il

=== Critical biography ===
- Shinichi Sano, Kaiyuden: Rentaro Mikuni Acting Until Death (怪優伝 三國連太郎 死ぬまで演じ続けること) (Kodansha, 2011, ISBN 9784062168137)
- Naoko Utsunomiya, What is so sad about farewell, said Rentaro Mikuni. (別れの何が悲しいのですかと、三國連太郎は言った) (Chuokoron-Shinsha, 2013, ISBN 9784120045547)
- Naoko Utsunomiya, Rentaro Mikuni, Wandering Souls (三國連太郎、彷徨う魂へ) (Bungeishunjū, 2020, ISBN 9784163911922).

== Honours and awards ==
Blue Ribbon Awards

- 1951: Best Newcomer for The Good Fairy
- 1960: Best Actor for The Great Journey
- 1979: Best Supporting Actor for Vengeance Is Mine
- 1989: Best Actor for Rikyu
- 2013: Special Award

Mainichi Film Awards

- 1961: Best Supporting Actor for Hadakako, The Catch
- 1965: Best Actor for A Fugitive from the Past, Nippon Thief Story
- 1974: Best Actor for Ragged Flag
- 1989: Best Actor for Rikyu, Tsuribaka Nisshi

Kinema Junpo Award

- 1965: Best Actor for Nippon Thief Story
- 1979: Best Supporting Actor for Vengeance Is Mine
- 1989: Best Actor for Rikyu
- 1991: Best Actor for My Sons

Hochi Film Awards

- 1979: Best Supporting Actor for Vengeance Is Mine
- 1989: Best Actor for Rikyu, Tsuribaka Nisshi 2

Japan Academy Film Prize

- 1989: Outstanding Performance by an Actor in a Leading Role - Rikyu, Tsuribaka Nisshi 2
- 1991: Outstanding Performance by an Actor in a Leading Role - Tsuribaka Nisshi 4 and My Sons
- 1995: Outstanding Performance by an Actor in a Leading Role - Mitabi no Kaikyō
- 2013: Special Award from the Chairman

Japanese Movie Critics Awards

- 1991: Best Actor for My Sons
- 2003: Diamond Grand Prize

Other Awards and Honours

- 1965: White Bronze Award for Best Actor, A Fugitive from the Past
- 1984: Medal with Purple Ribbon
- 1987: Jury Prize (Cannes Film Festival), Shinran: Path to Purity
- 1989: Kinokuniya Theatre Award, Individual Prize, Dresser
- 1991: Nikkan Sports Film Award for Best Actor, My Sons
- 1992: Monte-Carlo Television Festival, Best Actor - Winter Journey
- 1993: Order of the Rising Sun, Gold Rays with Rosette
- 2007: Mainichi Art Award, Special Prize for his performances in Tsuribaka Nisshi series and Hokushin Nanameni Sasu Tokoro
- 2010: 27th Yamaji Fumiko Film Award, Yamaji Fumiko Cultural Foundation Special Prize
