= Mount Hakkoda (1977 film) =

Mount Hakkōda
- Film poster
- Directed by: Shirō Moritani
- Written by: Shinobu Hashimoto; Yoshitarō Nomura; Tomoyuki Tanaka
- Produced by: Shinobu Hashimoto
- Starring: Ken Takakura; Kinya Kitaōji; Yūzō Kayama; Komaki Kurihara; Mariko Kaga; Kumiko Akiyoshi; Kensaku Morita; Ken Ogata; Keiju Kobayashi; Takuya Fujioka; Shōgo Shimada; Rentarō Mikuni; Tetsurō Tamba
- Cinematography: Daisaku Kimura
- Edited by: Michiko Ikeda; Jūgo Takemura
- Music by: Yasushi Akutagawa
- Production company: Toho
- Distributed by: Toho
- Release date: June 4, 1977 (Japan)
- Running time: 169 minutes
- Country: Japan
- Language: Japanese
- Box office: 2.59 billion JPY

Mt. Hakkoda (Japanese: 八甲田山, Hepburn: Hakkōda-san) is a 1977 Japanese film directed by Shirō Moritani. Based on the novelist Jirō Nitta's recounting of the Hakkōda Mountains incident, the film tells the story of two infantry regiments of the Imperial Japanese Army, consisting of 210 men, that tried to traverse the Hakkōda Mountains in the winter of 1902, in preparation for the anticipated Russo-Japanese War. The film was Japan's submission to the 50th Academy Awards for the Academy Award for Best Foreign Language Film, but was not accepted as a nominee.

== Cast ==
- Ken Takakura as Captain Tokushima (徳島)
- Kin'ya Kitaōji as Captain Kanda (神田)
- Yūzō Kayama as Captain Kurata (倉田)
- Rentarō Mikuni as Major Yamada (山田)
- Komaki Kurihara as Hatsuko Kanda (Captain Kanda's wife)
- Hideji Otaki as Colonel Nakabayashi (中林)
- Shōgo Shimada as General Tomoda, commander of the 4th Brigade (友田)
- Akira Hamada as Lieutenant Tanabe (田辺)
- Mariko Kaga as Taeko Tokushima (Captain Tokushima's wife)
- Kenichi Kato as Sublieutenant Takahata (高畑)
- Ren Ebata as Apprentice Officer Funayama (船山)
- Gin Maeda as Corporal Saitō (斎藤)
- Kin Sugai as Saitō's mother
- Ben Hiura as Satō (佐藤)
- Kumiko Akiyoshi as Takiguchi Sawa, a local mountain guide from Utarube village (滝口さわ)
- Hanasawa Tokue as Takiguchi Denzō, Utarube villager and adoptive father of Sawa (滝口伝蔵)
- Yoshi Kato as Saemon, chief of Tamogino village (作右衛門)
- Jun Tazaki as Sadao Suzuki, master of the Sanbongi relay station (鈴木貞雄)
- Isao Tamagawa as Captain Okitsu (沖津)
- Katsu Ryuzaki as Army surgeon Nagano (永野（ながの）三等軍医)
- Takuya Fujioka as Major Monma, commander of the 1st Battalion (門間)
- Shigeru Koyama as Major Kinomiya, officer at the regimental headquarters (木宮)
- Katsutoshi Arata as Eto (江藤)
- Michihiro Yamanishi as Noguchi (野口)
- Kensaku Morita as Sublieutenant Mikami (三上)
- Kohei Takayama as Apprentice Officer Nagao (長尾)
- Keiju Kobayashi as Commander Tsumura (津村)
- Ken Ogata as Corporal Murayama (村山)
- Tetsurō Tamba as Colonel Kojima (小島)
- Funahashi Saburō as Saikai Yūjirō, a war correspondent for the Tō-Ō Nippō (西海勇次郎)

== See also ==
- List of submissions to the 50th Academy Awards for Best Foreign Language Film
- List of Japanese submissions for the Academy Award for Best Foreign Language Film
