= Tsuribaka Nisshi (film) =

Japanese name
- Kanji: 釣りバカ日誌
Transcriptions
- Revised Hepburn: Tsuribaka Nisshi
- Directed by: Tomio Kuriyama
- Produced by: Shizuo Yamanouchi
- Starring: Toshiyuki Nishida; Rentarō Mikuni
- Cinematography: Kosuke Yasuda
- Music by: Bingo Miki
- Distributed by: Shochiku
- Release date: December 24, 1988
- Running time: 93 minutes
- Country: Japan
- Language: Japanese

Tsuribaka Nisshi (釣りバカ日誌) is a 1988 Japanese comedy film directed by Tomio Kuriyama. It was released on 24 December 1988. It is the first film in Tsuribaka Nisshi series. Most of this series are released as one of double feature such as Otoko wa Tsurai yo. The origin is Tsuribaka Nisshi (釣りバカ日誌; "Fishing Fool's Diary") , a fishing manga by Jūzō Yamasaki (story) and Kenichi Kitami since 1979.

The film focuses on salaryman Densuke Hamasaki (a.k.a. Hama-chan), whom his supervisor Sasaki has dubbed the "Fishing Baka" because of his passion for fishing.

== Cast ==
- Toshiyuki Nishida as Densuke Hamasaki
- Rentarō Mikuni as Ichinosuke Suzuki
- Eri Ishida as Michiko Hamasaki
- Kei Tani
- Mami Yamase
- Akira Nagoya as Noguchi

== Awards ==
- 17th Japan Academy Prize: Best Actor - Rentarō Mikuni
