= Get Up! (film) =

- Theatrical release poster
- Directed by: Kazuyuki Izutsu
- Written by: Kazuyuki Izutsu
- Starring: Toshiyuki Nishida; Takako Tokiwa; Tarō Yamamoto; Ittoku Kishibe
- Cinematography: Hideo Yamamoto
- Release date: October 5, 2003 (Japan)
- Running time: 112 minutes
- Country: Japan
- Language: Japanese

Get Up! (Japanese: ゲロッパ!, Hepburn: Geroppa!) is a 2003 comedy film written and directed by Kazuyuki Izutsu, starring Toshiyuki Nishida. It is about a gangster obsessed with James Brown, and his last day of freedom before he starts a 5-year prison term.

== Plot ==
Hanemura, the head of a yakuza clan, is enjoying his last taste of freedom before starting a prison sentence. He tells the members of his 'family' to disband the clan and go straight. However, his clan 'brother' believes the clan can be saved if they arrange for James Brown to give Hanemura a private performance before he goes to prison.

The gang mistakenly kidnaps an American James Brown impersonator, who is also being hunted by aides of the Japanese Prime Minister, seeking to recover incriminating materials that he unwittingly brought into the country.

Meanwhile, Hanemura spends his last day of freedom searching for the daughter he hasn't seen in 25 years.

These storylines intertwine when it emerges that his daughter runs the talent agency that had brought the James Brown impersonator to Japan in the first place.

After many complications, father and daughter are reunited, Hanemura saves his daughter's company by performing a James Brown routine and his prison sentence is overturned.

== Cast ==
- Toshiyuki Nishida as Hanemura, the yakuza boss
- Takako Tokiwa as Kaori
- Tarō Yamamoto as Taro
- Ittoku Kishibe as Kaneyama
- Kenta Kiritani as Haruhiko
- Kohei Yoshida as Kenji
- Keiji Nagatsuka as Okabe
- Willie Raynor as James Brown impersonator
- Adeyto as Marilyn Monroe impersonator

== Production ==
The Japanese title "Geroppa!" is the Japanese transliteration of the lyric "Get up!" from the James Brown song "Get Up (I Feel Like Being a) Sex Machine". Mixing slapstick, soul music and tearjerking elements, the plot involves a kidnapped James Brown impersonator, a plot to discredit the Japanese Prime Minister, an adulterous hotel manager, and a daughter who hasn't seen her father for 25 years.

== Release ==
The film screened at the Busan International Film Festival on October 5, 2003.

== Reception ==
Toshiyuki Nishida was nominated for the Best Actor award at the 2004 Japanese Academy Awards for his performance as the head of a yakuza clan.
