= A Class to Remember =

1993 film

- DVD cover
- Directed by: Yōji Yamada
- Written by: Yoshitaka Asama; Yōji Yamada
- Produced by: Shigehiro Nakagawa
- Starring: Toshiyuki Nishida; Eiko Shinya; Keiko Takeshita
- Cinematography: Mutsuo Naganuma; Tetsuo Takaba
- Edited by: Iwao Ishii
- Music by: Isao Tomita
- Distributed by: Shochiku
- Release date: November 6, 1993 (Japan)
- Running time: 128 minutes
- Country: Japan
- Language: Japanese

A Class to Remember (Japanese: 学校, Hepburn: Gakkō; lit. "School") is a 1993 Japanese film directed by Yōji Yamada. It was chosen as Best Film at the Japan Academy Prize ceremony.

== Synopsis ==
One day, Kuroi, a teacher at a night school, is unexpectedly called in by the principal. The suggestion of a transfer is brought up, but Kuroi firmly declines, expressing a desire to maintain a connection with the night school environment, even humorously suggesting they be called the "Old Badger." In Kuroi's class, a diverse range of students attend: Kazu, who manages work alongside night classes; Eriko, a junior high first-year facing attendance issues; Midori, a spirited troublemaker; Zhang, a Chinese student adjusting to life in Japan; Omoni, a yakiniku restaurant manager; Shuu, who faces challenges due to cerebral palsy; and Ino-san, an enthusiastic horse racing fan whose life has been marked by physical labor.

As the story develops, each student grapples with their own unique struggles while attending night classes within their individual life circumstances. Against this backdrop, the narrative unfolds, revealing the dynamics of their interactions and personal growth.

== Cast ==
- Toshiyuki Nishida
- Eiko Shinya
- Keiko Takeshita
- Nae Yuuki
- Kunie Tanaka
- Kiyoshi Atsumi
- Masato Hagiwara
- Yuri Nakae
- Hiroshi Kanbe
- Senri Oe
- Takashi Sasano
- Shinya Owada
- Kayako Sono
- Jiro Sakagami
- Kei Suma

== Reception ==
At the 1994 Japan Academy Prize the film won the awards for Best Film, Best Director, Best Screenplay, Best Actor, Best Supporting Actor, Best Sound, Rookie of the Year and the Popularity Award. It was also nominated for Best Supporting Actress, Best Music, Best Cinematography, Best Lighting Direction, Best Art Direction and Best Editing.

== Gakko series ==
- A Class to Remember (1993)
- Gakko II (1996)
- Gakko III (1998)
- Jyu Gosai Gakko IV (2000)
