= Jūzō Yamasaki =

Japanese manga artist (born 1941)

Jūzō Yamasaki (やまさき十三 or 山崎十三, Yamasaki Jūzō; born June 19, 1941 in Miyakonojō, Miyazaki Prefecture) is a Japanese manga artist.

His best known work is Tsuribaka Nisshi with art by Kenichi Kitami. Yamasaki originally wrote screenplays for Toei, but was laid off and decided to pursue a career in manga instead. He has won both the Shogakukan and Kodansha Manga Award for Tsuri Baka Nikki and Okashina Futari respectively.

== Works ==
- Tsuribaka Nisshi (釣りバカ日誌) drawn by Kenichi Kitami
- Satchmo (サッチモ) drawn by Kenichi Kitami
- Ashita Tenpei (あした天兵) drawn by Hideaki Hataji
- Gamushara (がむしゃら) drawn by Mitsuru Adachi
- Fuun Tenka Tori (風雲天下盗り) co-written with Sentarō Kubota and drawn by Mitsuyoshi Sonoda
- Hatsukoi Kōshien (初恋甲子園) drawn by Mitsuru Adachi
- Nakimushi Kōshien (泣き虫甲子園) drawn by Mitsuru Adachi
- Sekiyō yo Nobore!! (夕陽よ昇れ!!) drawn by Mitsuru Adachi
- Okashina Futari (おかしな二人) drawn by Kei Sadayasu
- Itoshii no Chiipappa (愛しのチィパッパ) drawn by Kinichi Kitama
- Pro Golfer Baku (プロゴルファー貘) drawn by Kenichirō Takai
- Yume Kōjō (夢工場) drawn by Kenshi Hirokane
- Nakimushi Kōshien (泣き虫甲子園) drawn by Mitsuru Adachi
- Bangai Kōshien (番外甲子園) drawn by Mamoru Uchiyama
- Ore wa Namazumono. (おれはナマズ者) drawn by Mitsuo Hashimoto
- Tenchi Muyo/This Side Up (天地無用) drawn by Kenji Okamura
