= Gray Sunset =

- Theatrical poster
- Directed by: Shunya Itō
- Written by: Hirō Matsuda
- Starring: Yukiyo Toake; Minoru Chiaki
- Cinematography: Isamu Iguchi
- Edited by: Isamu Ichida
- Music by: Shin'ichirō Ikebe
- Distributed by: Toei Company
- Release date: 10 October 1985 (Japan)
- Running time: 122 minutes
- Country: Japan
- Language: Japanese

Gray Sunset (花いちもんめ, Hana Ichi Monme) is a 1985 Japanese film directed by Shunya Itō. It was Japan's submission to the 58th Academy Awards for the Academy Award for Best Foreign Language Film, but was not accepted as a nominee. It won the award for Best Film at the Japan Academy Prize ceremony.

== Premise ==
The film follows Fuyukichi Takano, a university professor fired due to his worsening Alzheimer's disease. Fuyukichi's condition causes his family to rally around him, deepening their ties to each other in the process.

== Cast ==
- Yukiyo Toake as Keiko Takano
- Minoru Chiaki as Fuyukichi Takano
- Teruhiko Saigo as Haruo Takano
- Yumiko Nogawa as Nobue Kaneko
- Haruko Kato as Kikuyo Takano
- Yoshiko Nakada as Tomoko Iizuka
- Sayoko Ninomiya as Mitsue Takano
- Ittoku Kishibe as Yoshikazu Ishimoto

== See also ==
- List of submissions to the 58th Academy Awards for Best Foreign Language Film
- List of Japanese submissions for the Academy Award for Best Foreign Language Film

== Bibliography ==
- Hana ichimonme (1985) at IMDb
- 花いちもんめ (in Japanese). Japanese Movie Database.
- "HANA ICHIMONME". The Complete Index to World Film.
- 花いちもんめ。 (in Japanese). walkerplus.com. Archived from the original on 12 January 2005.
- "Variety Japan" 花いちもんめ (in Japanese). Variety Japan.
