= Tsuribaka Nisshi 6 =

Japanese name
- Kanji: 釣りバカ日誌6
- Directed by: Tomio Kuriyama
- Starring: Toshiyuki Nishida; Rentarō Mikuni
- Music by: Tetsurō Kashibuchi
- Release date: December 25, 1993
- Country: Japan
- Language: Japanese

Tsuribaka Nisshi 6 (釣りバカ日誌6, Tsuribaka Nisshi 6) is a 1993 Japanese film directed by Tomio Kuriyama.

== Awards ==
17th Japan Academy Prize

- Won: Best Actor – Toshiyuki Nishida
- Nominated: Best Actor – Rentarō Mikuni
