= Tsuribaka Nisshi 14 =

Japanese name
- Kanji: 釣りバカ日誌14 お遍路大パニック!
Transcriptions
- Revised Hepburn: Tsuribaka Nisshi 14: O-Henro Dai Panic!
- Directed by: Yūzō Asahara
- Starring: Toshiyuki Nishida
- Music by: Taro Iwashiro
- Release date: September 20, 2003
- Country: Japan
- Language: Japanese

Tsuribaka Nisshi 14 (釣りバカ日誌14 お遍路大パニック!, Tsuribaka Nisshi 14: O-Henro Dai Panic!) is a 2003 Japanese film directed by Yūzō Asahara.

== Cast ==
- Toshiyuki Nishida
- Rentaro Mikuni
- Jun Kunimura
- Kunihiro Matsumura
- Kei Tani

== Awards ==
46th Blue Ribbon Award

- Won: Best Actor – Toshiyuki Nishida
