= Toshiyuki Nishida =

Japanese actor (1947–2024)

- 西田 敏行
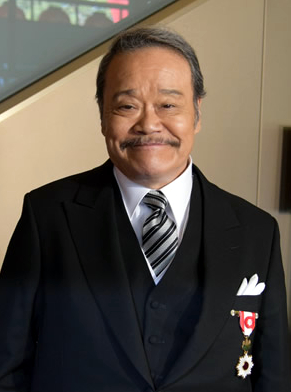
- Nishida in 2018
- Born: Toshiyuki Imai (今井 敏行); November 4, 1947; Koriyama, Fukushima Prefecture, Japan
- Died: October 17, 2024 (aged 76); Setagaya, Tokyo, Japan
- Occupations: Actor, business executive
- Years active: 1967–2024

Toshiyuki Nishida (西田 敏行, Nishida Toshiyuki; November 4, 1947 – October 17, 2024) was a Japanese actor. He won two Japanese Academy Awards for best actor, for The Silk Road (1988) and Tsuribaka Nisshi 6 (1993). He also won the Blue Ribbon Award for Best Actor for Get Up! and Tsuribaka Nisshi 14 (2003). Outside Japan he was best known for his role as Pigsy (Cho Hakkai) in the TV series Monkey.

Nishida served as president of the Japan Actors Union and vice president of the Japan Academy Film Prize Organization Committee. He received the Order of the Rising Sun in 2018.

== Personal life ==
Nishida was born Toshiyuki Imai (今井 敏行) on November 4, 1947, in Kōriyama, Fukushima, to Izumi and Kie Imai. His biological father Izumi worked at the Kōriyama Postal Savings Bureau, and was born to the family of a karō, a top-ranking samurai official. Izumi died when Nishida was young, and Kie raised him while working as a beautician. After Kie remarried, Nishida, five years old at the time, was adopted by Kie's younger sister and her husband, Miyo and Tatsuji Nishida, respectively. His adoptive father's ancestors served Shimazu Nariakira, the daimyo of Satsuma Domain, and defended Satsuma during the Anglo-Satsuma War.

Nishida and his adoptive parents lived at a Shinto shrine's office, and although Tatsuji worked at the Kōriyama City Hall, the family was barely making a living. Tatsuji took him to the movies on the weekends, which inspired Nishida to join the drama club at his elementary school. During middle school, he told his parents that he wanted to become an actor and received strong support from his parents. During high school, he moved to Tokyo to "learn standard Japanese". In 1968, he entered an acting school, and his parents moved to Tokyo to support him.

Nishida was found dead in his home in Setagaya, Tokyo, on October 17, 2024, at the age of 76. He had previously been suffering from a chronic heart condition.

== Career ==
In Japan, he was best known for his fishing comedy series, Tsuribaka Nisshi ("The Fishing Maniac's Diary"), which spans 21 episodes. Outside Japan Nishida was best known for his portrayal of Pigsy in the first season of the TV series Monkey, or for his role in the 2008 film The Ramen Girl, as the sensei of American actress Brittany Murphy's character.

Nishida was nominated 10 times for a Japanese Academy Award and won twice, once for best actor in The Silk Road in 1988 as Gakko, and once for best actor in Tsuribaka Nisshi 6 in 1993. He won the Blue Ribbon Award for Best Actor in 2003 for Get Up! and Tsuribaka Nisshi 14.

In 2017, Nishida reprised his role as yakuza underboss Nishino in Takeshi Kitano's Outrage trilogy to positive reviews.

In 2018, Nishida received the Order of the Rising Sun, Gold Rays with Rosette, alongside comedian Takeshi Kitano.

Nishida served as president of the Japan Actors Union and vice president of the Japan Academy Film Prize Organization Committee. He was a 'Frontier Ambassador' for his hometown of Kōriyama City.

== Filmography ==
=== Film ===
Year	Title	Role	Notes	Source
1974	Okita Sōji	Nagakura Shinpachi		
1977	Ballad of Orin	Suketaro		
1979	Devil's Flute	Kindaichi Kōsuke		
1981	Edo Porn	Sashichi		
1984	Station to Heaven			
1986	Lost in the Wilderness	Naomi Uemura	Lead role	
1988	Dun-Huang	Zhu Wangli	Lead role	
1988–2009	Tsuribaka Nisshi series	Hama-chan	Lead role	
1992	Tengoku no Taizai			
1992	Dreams of Russia			
1992	Kantsubaki	Iwago Tomita	Lead role	
1993	Gakko	Mr. Kuroi	Lead role	
1996	Gakko II	Ryuhei Aoyama	Lead role	
2002	Dawn of a New Day: The Man Behind VHS	Shizuo Kagaya	Lead role	
2003	Get Up!		Lead role	
2006	The Uchōten Hotel			
2007	Sukiyaki Western Django			
2007	Happy Ever After			
2008	The Ramen Girl		American film	
2008	Flowers in the Shadows	Moses		
2008	The Magic Hour	Kōnosuke Teshio		
2009	Castle Under Fiery Skies		Lead role	
2009	Asahiyama Zoo Story: Penguins in the Sky	Kanji Takizawa	Lead role	
2010	Space Battleship Yamato	Hikozaemon Tokugawa		
2011	A Letter to Momo	Iwa	Voice role	
2011	Once in a Blue Moon	Sarashina Rokubei		
2012	Reunion	Aiba	Lead role	
2012	Beyond Outrage	Nishino		
2013	Emperor	General Kajima	American film	
2013	The Kiyosu Conference	Sarashina Rokubei		
2015	Maestro!	Tendō		
2015	Jinuyo Saraba: Kamuroba Mura e	Nakanussan		
2015	Love & Peace	Pa		
2015	Galaxy Turnpike			
2016	A Living Promise	Gentaro Nishimura		
2017	Miracles of the Namiya General Store	Yūji Namiya		
2017	Outrage Coda	Nishino		
2019	Ninkyō Gakuen	Yūzō Akimoto	Lead role	
2020	Voices in the Wind	Imada		
2020	The Untold Tale of the Three Kingdoms	Munemitsu Soga		
2021	A Morning of Farewell	Tōru Senkawa		
2022	What to Do with the Dead Kaiju?	Prime Minister Kan Nishiōtachime		
2024	Doctor-X: The Movie	Shigekatsu Hiruma	Posthumous release	

=== Television ===
Year	Title	Role	Notes	Source
1974	Shin Heike Monogatari	Hōjō Yoshitoki	Taiga drama	
1977	Kashin	Yamagata Aritomo	Taiga drama	
1977–1979	Tokusō Saizensen	Detective Yōzō Takasugi		
1978–1979	Saiyuki	Cho Hakkai/Pigsy		
1981	Onna Taikō-ki	Toyotomi Hideyoshi	Taiga drama	
1984	Sanga Moyu	Tadashi Amō	Lead role, Taiga drama	
1986	Byakkotai	Kayano Gonbei		
1988	Takeda Shingen	Yamamoto Kansuke	Taiga drama	
1990	Tobu ga Gotoku	Saigō Takamori	Lead role, Taiga drama	
1995	Hachidai Shogun Yoshimune	Tokugawa Yoshimune	Lead role, Taiga drama	
1998	Oda Nobunaga: Tenka wo Totta Baka	Saitō Dōsan	Special appearance, TV movie	
2000	Aoi	Tokugawa Hidetada	Lead role, Taiga drama	
2003	Musashi	Yamanouchi Hanbei	Taiga drama	
2003	The Great White Tower	Mataichi Zaizen		
2005	Tiger and Dragon	Hayashiyatei Donbei		
2005	Hiroshima Showa 20 nen 8 Gatsu Muika	elder Toshiaki Yajima	TV movie	
2006	Kōmyō ga Tsuji	Tokugawa Ieyasu	Taiga drama	
2007	The Family	Ichirō Ōkawa		
2009–2011	Clouds Over the Hill	Takahashi Korekiyo		
2010	Wagaya no Rekishi	Yame Tokijiro	Miniseries	
2010	Yae's Sakura	Saigō Tanomo	Taiga drama	
2010	Detective Lovesick	Tsukikage Yōzō		
2013–2021	Doctor-X	Shigekatsu Hiruma	7 seasons	
2014	Nobunaga Concerto	Saitō Dōsan		
2014	Tokyo ni Olympic o Yonda Otoko	Masaji Tabata	TV movie	
2015	Tsuribaka Nisshi	Su-san		
2016	Montage	Shinnosuke Sawada	TV movie	
2017	Kohaku	Katsumi Yoneda	Lead role, TV movie	
2018	Segodon	Narrator / Saigō Kikujirō	Taiga drama	
2021	Story of My Family!!!	Jusaburo Miyama		
2022	The 13 Lords of the Shogun	Emperor Go-Shirakawa	Taiga drama	
2023	Fixer	Goichi Hongō	Special appearance	

=== Variety show ===
Year	Title	Notes	Source
2001–2019	Knight Scoop	as Chairman	

=== Dubbing ===
- Robots (Bigweld)

== Honours ==
- Medal with Purple Ribbon (2008)
- Order of the Rising Sun, 4th Class, Gold Rays with Rosette (2018)
