= Toyoko Yamasaki =

Japanese writer

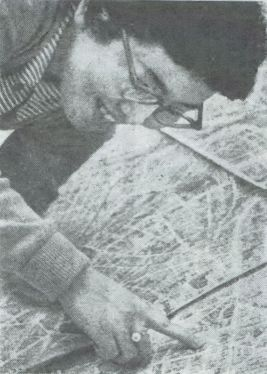
- Born: Toyoko Sugimoto; 3 November 1924; Osaka, Japan
- Died: 29 September 2013 (aged 88); Osaka, Japan
- Education: Japanese literature
- Alma mater: Kyoto Women's University
- Occupations: Journalist, Novelist
- Spouse(s): Kamekuo Sugimoto (杉本亀久雄, 1961 - died 1992)
- Writing career
- Language: Japanese
- Period: 1957-2013
- Genre: Novel
- Subjects: Osaka Merchants, Social Issues
- Notable works: Hana Noren, Shiroi Kyotō, Shizumanu Taiyō
- Notable awards: Naoki Prize (1958); Osaka Prefecture's Art Prize (1959); Fujin Koron Readers' Prize (1962 and 1968); Kikuchi Kan Prize (1991); Bungei Shunju Readers' Prize (1991); Mainichi Culture Prize (2009)

Toyoko Yamasaki (山崎 豊子, Yamasaki Toyoko; real name Sugimoto Toyoko (杉本 豊子); 3 November 1924 – 29 September 2013) was a Japanese novelist.

A native of Osaka, Yamasaki worked as a journalist for the Mainichi Shimbun from 1945 to 1959 after graduating from Kyoto Women's University in Japanese literature. She published her first story, Noren (1957), a story of a kelp trader, based on the experiences of her family's business. The following year, she won the Naoki Prize for her second novel Hana Noren, the story about the founder of an entertainment group. A major influence on her writings of that period was Yasushi Inoue, who was deputy head of the Mainichi Shimbun's cultural news desk.

Yamasaki wrote some stories based on actual events. For example, Futatsu no Sokoku is derived from the biography of a Japanese American David Akira Itami, and Shizumanu Taiyō is based on the Japan Air Lines Flight 123 accident. Several works of hers were featured in films and television dramas.

== Main works ==
Date	Title	Live-action adaptations	Notes
1957	Noren (暖簾)		
1958	Hana Noren (花のれん)	1959 Film: starring Chikage Awashima; 1960 TV: starring Mineko Yorozuya; 1962 TV: starring Mitsuko Mori; 1966 TV: starring Yōko Minamida; 1995 TV: starring Nobuko Miyamoto; 2025 TV: starring Keiko Kitagawa	Awarded the 39th Naoki Prize.
1959	Bonchi (ぼんち, translated by Harue and Travis Summersgill as Bonchi)	1960 Film: starring Ichikawa Raizō VIII; 1962 TV: starring Nakamura Senjaku II; 1972 TV: starring Masahiko Tsugawa	
1961	Onna no Kunsho (女の勲章)	1961 Film: starring Machiko Kyō; 1962 TV: starring Yumeji Tsukioka; 1976 TV: starring Yoshiko Mita; 2017 TV: starring Nanako Matsushima	
1963	Nyokei Kazoku (女系家族)	1963 Film: starring Ayako Wakao; 1963 TV: starring Nobuko Otowa; 1970 TV: starring Yuki Kawamura; 1975 TV: starring Mariko Okada; 1984 TV: starring Yoshiko Mita; 1991 TV: starring Miwa Takada; 1994 TV: starring Yūko Natori; 2005 TV: starring Ryōko Yonekura; 2021 TV: starring Rie Miyazawa and Shinobu Terajima	
1965	Shiroi Kyotō (白い巨塔)	1966 Film: starring Jirō Tamiya; 1967 TV: starring Kei Satō; 1978 TV: starring Jirō Tamiya; 1990 TV: starring Hiroaki Murakami; 2003 TV: starring Toshiaki Karasawa; 2007 TV: starring Kim Myung-min (Korean version); 2019 TV: starring Junichi Okada	
1973	Karei-naru Ichizoku (華麗なる一族)	1974 TV: starring Sō Yamamura and Yūzō Kayama; 1974 Film: starring Shin Saburi and Tatsuya Nakadai; 2007 TV: starring Takuya Kimura and Kinya Kitaōji; 2021 TV: starring Kiichi Nakai and Osamu Mukai	
1976	Fumō Chitai (不毛地帯, translated by James T. Araki as The Barren Zone)	1976 Film: starring Tatsuya Nakadai; 1979 TV: starring Mikijirō Hira; 2009 TV: starring Toshiaki Karasawa	
1983	Futatsu no Sokoku (二つの祖国, translated by V. Dixon Morris as Two Homelands)	1984 TV: starring Matsumoto Kōshirō IX and Toshiyuki Nishida; 2019 TV: starring Shun Oguri	
1991	Daichi no Ko (大地の子)	1995 TV: starring Tatsuya Nakadai and Takaya Kamikawa	
1999	Shizumanu Taiyō (沈まぬ太陽)	2009 Film: starring Ken Watanabe; 2016 TV: starring Takaya Kamikawa	
2009	Unmei no hito (運命の人)	2012 TV: starring Masahiro Motoki	
