= The Barren Zone =

Novel by Toyoko Yamasaki

- First tankōbon volume cover
- Author: Toyoko Yamasaki
- Original title: 不毛地帯
- Translator: James T. Araki
- Language: Japanese
- Published: University of Hawaii Press
- Publication date: 1973–78
- Publication place: Japan
- English publication date: 1985

The Barren Zone (Japanese: 不毛地帯, Hepburn: Fumō chitai) is a novel by Toyoko Yamasaki. It was serialized in the weekly magazine Sunday Mainichi from 1973 to 1978.

The novel was partially adapted into a film starring Tatsuya Nakadai and directed by Satsuo Yamamoto in 1976. It was later adapted into two television miniseries in 1979 and 2009.

== Synopsis ==
Tadashi Iki is captured during the invasion of Manchuria and returns to Japan after being interned for over a decade in Soviet labor camps. Owing to his former position in the Imperial General Staff, he is offered a position at the expansive Kinki Corporation.

== 1976 film ==
Fumō Chitai
- Film poster
- Directed by: Satsuo Yamamoto
- Screenplay by: Nobuo Yamada
- Starring: Tatsuya Nakadai; Isao Yamagata; Kin'ya Kitaōji; Tetsurō Tamba
- Music by: Masaru Sato
- Production company: Geiensha
- Distributed by: Toho
- Release date: August 28, 1976 (Japan)
- Running time: 181 minutes
- Country: Japan
- Language: Japanese

Fumō Chitai (不毛地帯) is a 1976 Japanese film directed by Satsuo Yamamoto.

=== Cast ===
- Tatsuya Nakadai - Tadashi Iki
- Tetsurō Tamba - Isao Kawamata
- Isao Yamagata - Ichizo Daimon
- Jūkei Fujioka - Army Chief General of Kwantung Army
- Kin'ya Kitaōji
- Takashi Yamaguchi
- Kaoru Yachigusa
- Shiho Fujimura
- Ichirō Nakatani
- Hisashi Igawa
- Eitaro Ozawa
- Etsushi Takahashi - Detective
- Jirō Tamiya - Tatsuzo Samejima
- Hideji Ōtaki - Seizo Hisamatsu
- Noboru Nakaya

=== Awards ===
1st Hochi Film Award

- Won: Best Supporting Actor - Hideji Ōtaki

31st Mainichi Film Award

- Won: Best Film
- Won: Best Screenplay: Noboru Yamada

== 1979 TV series ==
The Barren Zone
- Starring: Mikijirō Hira
- Country of origin: Japan
- Original language: Japanese
- No. of episodes: 31

Original release
- Network: TBS
- Release: April 4 – October 31, 1979

=== Cast ===
- Mikijirō Hira - Tadashi Iki
- Tomisaburo Wakayama - Ichizo Daimon
- Atsuo Nakamura - Tatsuzo Samejima
- Hideo Takamatsu - Tatsuya Satoi
- Kimiko Ikegami - Naoko Iki
- Takashi Shimura - Masaharu Tanigawa
- Kō Nishimura - Seizo Hisamatsu
- Tamao Nakamura
- Ayumi Ishida
- Ichirō Murakoshi - Narrator

== 2009 TV series ==
The Waste Land
- Starring: Toshiaki Karasawa; Koyuki; Kenichi Endō; Yutaka Takenouchi; Yūki Amami; Sadao Abe; Kuranosuke Sasaki; Toshirō Yanagiba; Emi Wakui; Isao Hashizume; Ittoku Kishibe; Yoshio Harada
- Narrated by: Issei Futamata
- Composer: Yugo Kanno
- Country of origin: Japan
- Original language: Japanese
- No. of episodes: 19

Original release
- Network: Fuji Television
- Release: March 11 – October 15, 2009

=== Cast ===
- Toshiaki Karasawa - Tadashi Iki
- Yoshio Harada - Ichizo Daimon
- Kenichi Endō - Tatsuzo Samejima
- Ittoku Kishibe - Tatsuya Satoi
- Toshirō Yanagiba - Isao Kawamata
- Emi Wakui - Yoshiko Iki
- Koyuki - Chisato Akitsu
- Nicholas Pettas - Pratt
- Mikako Tabe - Naoko Iki
- Sheryar Khan - Oil Company Manager
- Yasunori Danta as Michio Kaizuka
- Issei Futamata - Narrator

=== Netflix edition ===
It is streamed on Netflix without the "ending theme" of "Tom Traubert's Blues", from the 1976 studio album Small Change, sung by Tom Waits (© by Warner Music Japan), as written in the trailer, and without dubbing, but subtitled in the nine languages Chinese (long characters), English, French, German, Indonesian, Korean, Portuguese (Brasil), Spanish (Latin America) and Thai.
