= Karei-naru Ichizoku =

The Family (Japanese: 華麗なる一族, Hepburn: Karei-naru Ichizoku; lit. The Grand Family) is a 1973 novel by Toyoko Yamasaki. It has been adapted into a film in 1974 and then three times as a television series in 1974, 2007, and 2021.

== Plot ==
Set in the post-World War II climate of the 1960s in Kobe, the show explores the struggle for power within the powerful Manpyo family. The cornerstone of their empire is the Hanshin Bank (阪神銀行; a fictional version of the former Kobe Bank (now Sumitomo Mitsui Banking Corporation)), controlled by the father of the clan, Daisuke Manpyo (万俵 大介). Eldest son Teppei (万俵 鉄平) is the managing director of Hanshin Steelworks (阪神特殊製鋼; fictional version of Sanyo Special Steel Co., Ltd.). The ambitious Teppei seeks to expand operations of his company, and goes to his father to see if he can secure a loan. But the Minister of Finance seeks the merger of smaller Japanese banks to fend off foreign competition. Daisuke must decide whether to protect his son's interest in manufacturing or to ensure the survival of the bank that he controls.

The series mostly revolves on the hidden secrets within the Manpyo family. A running theme throughout the show is Teppei's constant hunger for his father's approval. However, instead of being seen as a son, he is often seen as a threat by his own father. Throughout most of the series, they are competing as Daisuke refuses to help in Teppei's struggles.

At the end, we are shown why the characters act as they did. Teppei's mother was supposedly raped by his grandfather, therefore, making Daisuke unsure if Teppei was actually his, or Keisuke's (his father). Teppei's uncanny resemblance to Keisuke, and his blood type proves to Daisuke that he was, indeed, his half-brother. This causes the heartache that surrounds the Manpyo family.

Teppei's company is not saved. As he finds out that he was not actually who he thought he was, he goes to the mountains where his family hunts. He makes a final call to his wife. The next morning, Teppei leaves a suicide note and shoots himself.

When the Manpyo family learns about Teppei's death, his mother is distraught. His father however, seems placid and cold. A man then comes in and asks the parents to sign Teppei's death certificate. Daisuke notices that they had made a mistake in the certificate, he states that they had Teppei's blood type wrong. The man informs them that the blood test was wrong. This revelation drives Teppei's mother into a fit. Daisuke is weakened. The man he thought to be a product of his father's horrible actions, was in fact, his own son. He is even more remorseful when he reads Teppei's suicide letter. Finally, Teppei is given the acceptance that he so long craved for.

== Television production 1974 ==
The Family
- Written by: Naoyuki Suzuki
- Directed by: Yasuhiro Seki
- Starring: So Yamamura; Yoko Shimada; Ryūzō Hayashi; Utako Mitsuya; Masako Izumi; Izumi Yamaguchi; Shinya Owada; Ryō Ikebe; Isao Yamagata; Meichō Soganoya; Shiho Fujimura; Kei Satō; Yoshiko Kuga; Yūzō Kayama; Mayumi Ogawa
- Narrated by: Mayumi Ogawa
- Composer: Kōichi Sakata
- Country of origin: Japan
- No. of episodes: 26

Production
- Running time: approx. 55 minutes

Original release
- Network: NET
- Release: 1 October 1974 – 25 March 1975

=== Cast ===
- So Yamamura – Daisuke Manpyo
- Mayumi Ogawa – Aiko Takasu / Narrator
- Yoko Shimada – Tsugiko Manpyo
- Yūzō Kayama – Teppei Manpyo
- Yoshiko Kuga – Yasuko Manpyo
- Ryūzō Hayashi – Ginpei Manpyo
- Masako Izumi – Fusako
- Yukiko Kashiwagi – Sanae Manpyo
- Izumi Yamaguchi – Makiko Yasuda
- Kei Satō – Ataru Mima
- Utako Mitsuya – Ichiko Mima
- Shinya Owada – Yoshihiko Ichinose
- Ryō Ikebe – Shoichi Mikumo
- Shiho Fujimura – Shiho Mikumo
- Meichō Soganoya – Sentaro Watanuki
- Ken Nishida – Kazuya Hosokawa
- Kōji Kawamura – Ichiro Okawa
- Masao Shimizu as Miyamoto
- Kazuya Oguri – the factory head Ichinose
- Kenji Sugawara – Hideyuki Akutagawa
- Kyōsuke Maki – Zenitaka
- Hideaki Nagai – Ōkame
- Akihiko Hirata – Haruta
- Kōichi Itō – the prime minister Sahashi
- Isao Yamagata – the finance minister Nagata

== Film ==
Karei-naru Ichizoku
- DVD cover
- Directed by: Satsuo Yamamoto
- Written by: Nobuo Yamada
- Produced by: Ichirō Satō; Kiichi Ichikawa; Michio Morioka
- Starring: Shin Saburi; Tatsuya Nakadai
- Cinematography: Kōzō Okazaki
- Edited by: Jun Nabeshima
- Music by: Masaru Sato
- Distributed by: Toho
- Release date: 26 January 1974 (Japan)
- Running time: 211 minutes
- Country: Japan
- Language: Japanese

Karei-naru Ichizoku was released theatrically in Japan on 26 January 1974, where it was distributed by Toho. The film was a commercial success.

=== Cast ===
- Shin Saburi as Daisuke Manpyō
- Tatsuya Nakadai as Teppei Manpyō / Keisuke Manpyō
- Yumeji Tsukioka as Yasuko Manpyō
- Yūki Meguro as Ginpei Manpyō
- Kyōko Kagawa as Ichiko Mima
- Yoko Yamamoto as Sanae Manpyō
- Wakako Sakai as Tsugiko Manpyō
- Kin'ya Kitaōji as Yoshihiko Ichinose
- Hideaki Nitani as Shōichi Mikumo
- Eitaro Ozawa as the finance minister Nagata
- Akiji Kobayashi as Kojima
- Mizuho Suzuki as Kuraishi
- Akihiko Hirata as Haruta
- Shigeru Kōyama as Wajima
- Tappei Shimokawa as Head of the Teikoku Seitetsu
- Yoshio Inaba as the factory head Ichinose
- Toshio Takahara as Tsunoda
- Hideji Ōtaki as Arao
- Nobuo Nakamura as Matsudaira
- Osamu Takizawa as Miyamoto
- Kō Nishimura as Watanuki
- Takashi Shimura as Tahei Yasuda
- Jirō Tamiya as Ataru Mima
- Machiko Kyō as Aiko Takasu

=== Honors ===
- Mainichi Film Award for Best Art Direction award
- Mainichi Film Award for Best Cinematography award
- In Kinema Junpo magazine's list of the 10 best Japanese films of the year, Karei-naru Ichizoku reached #3 in 1974.

== Television production 2007 ==
The Family
- Written by: Hiroshi Hashimoto
- Directed by: Katsuo Fukuzawa; Daisuke Yamamuro
- Starring: Takuya Kimura; Kyōka Suzuki; Kyōko Hasegawa; Koji Yamamoto; Yu Yamada; Saki Aibu; Tōru Nakamura; Kazue Fukiishi; Izumi Inamori; Yumi Takigawa; Hiroki Narimiya; Sei Hiraizumi; Masahiko Nishimura; Tetsuya Takeda; Masahiko Tsugawa; Toshiyuki Nishida; Mieko Harada; Kin'ya Kitaōji
- Narrated by: Chieko Baisho
- Composer: Takayuki Hattori
- Country of origin: Japan
- No. of episodes: 11

Production
- Running time: approx. 46 minutes

Original release
- Network: TBS
- Release: 14 January – 18 March 2007

=== Cast ===
- Takuya Kimura – Teppei Manpyo
- Kin'ya Kitaōji – Daisuke Manpyo
- Kyōka Suzuki – Aiko Takasu
- Kazue Fukiishi – Ichiko Mima
- Kyōko Hasegawa – Sanae Manpyo
- Toru Nakamura – Ataru Mima
- Hiroki Narimiya – Yoshihiko Ichinose
- Toshiyuki Nishida – Ichiro Okawa
- Masahiko Nishimura – Zenitaka
- Tetsuya Takeda – Ōkame
- Yu Yamada – Makiko Yasuda
- Koji Yamamoto – Ginpei Manpyo
- Toshirō Yanagiba – Shoichi Mikumo
- Saki Aibu – Tsugiko Manpyo
- Izumi Inamori – Fusako Tsuruta
- Yumi Takigawa – Shino Tsuruta
- Sei Hiraizumi – the factory head Ichinose
- Masayuki Ito – Matsuo Tanaka
- Shōfukutei Tsurube II – Sentaro Watanuki
- Masahiko Tsugawa – the finance minister Nagata
- Mieko Harada – Yasuko Manpyo

=== Ratings ===
The series attracted high ratings. Over the course of its run, the series averaged 23.9% in the Kanto region (TBS) and 30.4% in the Kansai region (MBS). The second half of the series' two-part "Finale" attained a rating of 30.4%, the highest rating achieved by a Japanese drama episode in 2007.

=== Hawaii broadcast ===
Karei-naru Ichizoku aired on KIKU-TV in Hawaii on September 23, 2007 to November 25, 2007 under the name The Grand Family. The broadcast included complete English subtitles.

== Television production 2021 ==
The Grand Family
- Written by: Yōichi Maekawa
- Directed by: Masaki Nishiura; Tatsuya Ikezawa
- Starring: Kiichi Nakai; Osamu Mukai; Taisuke Fujigaya; Riho Yoshioka; Honoka Matsumoto; Jun Kaname; Asuka Kudoh; Seiji Rokkaku; Masahiro Kōmoto; Ken Ishiguro; Masaya Kato; Masanobu Takashima; Yumi Asō; Kōji Ishizaka; Yuki Uchida
- Composer: Masahiro Tokuda
- Country of origin: Japan
- No. of episodes: 11

Production
- Running time: approx. 60 minutes

Original release
- Network: Wowow
- Release: 18 April – 11 July 2021

=== Cast ===
- Kiichi Nakai – Daisuke Manpyo
- Osamu Mukai – Teppei Manpyo
- Yuki Uchida – Aiko Takasu
- Yumi Asō – Yasuko Manpyo
- Taisuke Fujigaya – Ginpei Manpyo
- Riho Yoshioka – Makiko Yasuda
- Jun Kaname – Ataru Mima
- Rie Mimura – Ichiko Mima
- Honoka Matsumoto – Tsugiko Manpyo
- Asuka Kudoh – Yoshihiko Ichinose
- Rena Sasamoto – Sanae Manpyō
- Riko Fukumoto – Mitsuko Manpyo
- Toshiya Miyata – Kazuya Hosokawa
- Ken Ishiguro – Shoichi Mikumo
- Seiji Rokkaku – Sentaro Watanuki
- Toshiyuki Nagashima – Ichiro Okawa
- Masaya Kato – the factory head Ichinose
- Masanobu Takashima – Hideyuki Akutagawa
- Masahiro Kōmoto – Zenitaka
- Hajime Inoue – Ōkame
- Yoichi Nukumizu – Matsuo Tanaka
- Hisako Manda – Tsuruko
- Rena Tanaka – Fusako
- Masatō Ibu – the prime minister Sahashi
- Kōji Ishizaka (special appearance) – the finance minister Nagata
