= Jimon Terakado =

Japanese comedian and actor (born 1962)

- 寺門 ジモン
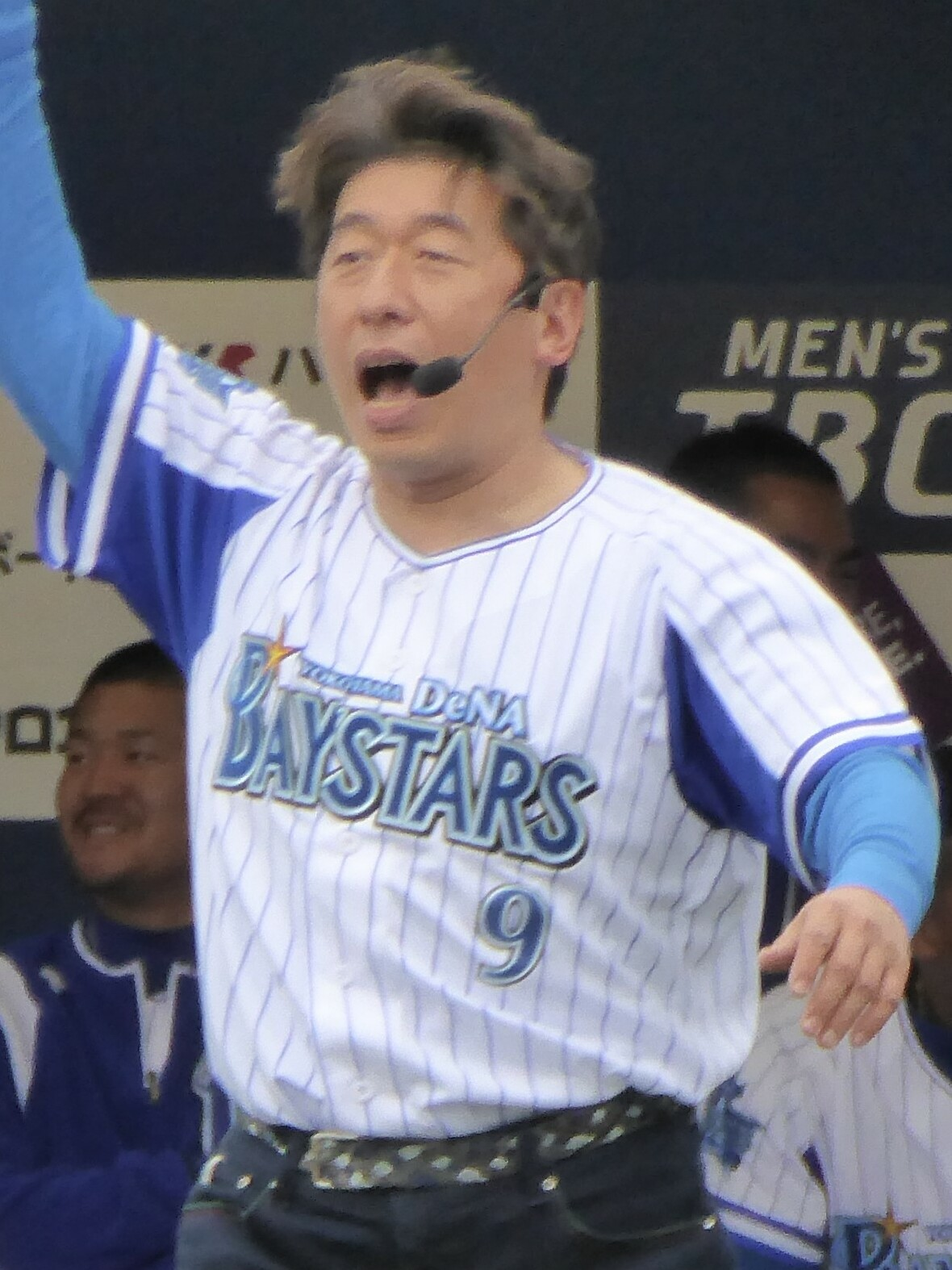
- 2015
- Born: Yoshito Terakado; 25 November 1962 (age 63); Kawanishi, Hyōgo, Japan
- Other names: Nature Jimon (ネイチャー ジモン, Neichā Jimon)
- Occupation: Comedian
- Years active: Since 1985
- Agent: Ohta Production
- Website: nature-jimon.com

Notes
- Same year/generation as: Utchan Nanchan; Hideyuki Nakayama

Yoshito Terakado (寺門 義人, Terakado Yoshito; born 25 November 1962, in Kawanishi, Hyōgo, Japan), better known as Jimon Terakado (寺門 ジモン, Terakado Jimon), is a Japanese comedian who is represented by the talent agency Ohta Production. He is part of the comedy trio Dachou Club.

He is known for his love of food, in particular beef, and appears often on gourmet programs on television.

== Filmography ==
=== Television series ===
==== Main ====
Year	Title	Network	Notes
2008	Jimon Terakado no Shoku Baka Kazuyo	Mondo21	
	Jimon Terakado no Shuzai Kyohi no Mise	Fuji TV One	
2012	Jimon Terakado no Jōren Meshi: Kiseki no Ura Menu	Fuji TV One	
2013	Kaiten! Jimon Teppan Tenka Muteki Gurume Ōbanburumai!!	TV Tokyo	
	Jimon Terakado no Zettai ni Tabete Hoshī Gatsu Meshi	BeeTV	
2014	Jimon Terakado no Niku Senmon Channel	Fuji TV One	

==== Other ====
Title	Network	Notes
Pro Sportsman No.1	TBS	
Kusano Kid	TV Asahi	
Yari-sugi Kōjī Doyō Fujin		
Narutomo		
Mermaid Collection	TV Asahi	
Kansai Tokushū	NHK Osaka	
Chī Sanpo	TV Asahi	
Selection X	TV Asahi	
Drive a Go!Go!	TV Tokyo	

=== Drama ===
Year	Title	Role	Network	Notes
1988	Kisetsuhazure no Kaigan Monogatari		Fuji TV	
2002	Chiharu Saotome no Tenjō Hōkoku-sho	Terahara	TBS	
2004	Sky High		TV Asahi	
2004	Seicho Matsumoto Tokubetsu Kikaku Satsui	Yoshitaka Aoki	TBS	
2005	Hatchōbori no Nana-ri		TV Asahi	6th Series, Episode 9
2005	Keiyaku Kekkon	Tsuguo Inagaki	Fuji TV	
2005	Yukemuri Doctor Mariko Hanaoka no Onsen Jiken-bo		TV Tokyo	
2006	Keisatsusho-chō Tasogare Seijirō		TV Tokyo	
2007	Mito Kōmon	Heikuro Nukui	TBS	Chapter 37, Episode 16
2008	Cat Street		NHK	Episodes 3 and 4

=== Films ===
Director

Year	Title	Notes
2020	Food Luck	

Actor

Year	Title	Role	Notes
2003	Yomigaeri		
2007	Dororo		
2009	Hana no Asuka-gumi!		
2014	Dakishimetai: Shinjitsu no Monogatari		
2014	Say "I love you"	Magazine editor-in-chief	

=== CD ===
Year	Title	Notes
2009	Nice Nature	Avex

=== Books ===
Year	Title	Notes
2006	Jimon Terakado no Kore o Kuwazu ni Shineru ka!!. ISBN 4777906388.	
2007	Jimon Terakado e tsu, Kore o Kuwazu ni Iki Teta no?. ISBN 477790895X.	
2007	Sekai Ijin-den Nature Jimon. ISBN 4861913047.	
2008	Jimon Terakado Kōrin! Niku no Kami-sama (jishō) Utagau Mae ni Tabe Nasai. ISBN 4777911985.	
2009	Bessatsu Lightning 73 Jimon no Niku Hon. ISBN 477791514X.	
2010	Jimon Terakado no Shuzai Kyohi no Mise. ISBN 459406244X.	
2010	Jimon Terakado no Zoku Shuzai Kyohi no Mise. ISBN 4594063357.	
2010	Bessatsu Lightning 95 Jimon no Nabemoto. ISBN 4777917894.	
2014	Jōren Meshi! Kiseki no Ura Menu. ISBN 4778313984.	

==== Manga ====
Title	Notes
Nature Jimon	Gekkan Young Magazine (Kodansha)
