= Shinya Owada =

Japanese actor, voice actor and narrator (born 1947)

- 大和田 伸也
- Born: 25 October 1947 (age 79); Tsuruga, Fukui, Japan
- Occupations: Actor; voice actor
- Years active: 1970s–present
- Agent: Horipro Booking Agency
- Notable work: The Lion King (Japanese dub)
- Television: Dramas; Ai yori Aoku; Mito Kōmon; Bayside Shakedown; Kids War: Zaken na yo; Mikon Rokushimai; Variety; Ītabi Yume Kibun
- Spouse: Michiko Godai
- Children: Yuta Owada (eldest son); Keisuke Owada (second son)
- Relatives: Baku Owada (brother)

Shinya Owada (大和田 伸也, Ōwada Shin'ya; born October 25, 1947 in Tsuruga, Fukui) is a Japanese actor, voice actor and narrator. He is represented with Horipro Booking Agency. He rusticated from Waseda University First Literature Department.

== Biography ==
In 1968, Owada joined Shiki Theatre Company.

== Filmography ==
=== TV dramas ===
Year	Title	Role	Notes	Ref.
1972–73	Ai yori Aoku	Shuichi Murakami	Asadora	
1978–83	Mito Kōmon	Atsumi "Kaku-san" Kakunoshin		
2009–11	Clouds Over the Hill	Inoue Kaoru		
2012	Man of Destiny	Kiichi Aikawa		
2021	Come Come Everybody	Kinetarō Tachibana	Asadora	

=== Films ===
Year	Title	Role	Notes	Ref.
1976	Manhunt	Inspector Hosoi		
2007	I Just Didn't Do It			
2018	50 First Kisses	Dr. Natori		
2020	Food Luck			
2021	Shrieking in the Rain			
2022	Fullmetal Alchemist: The Final Alchemy			
2025	True Beauty: Before	Soichiro Igarashi		
2025	True Beauty: After	Soichiro Igarashi		
2026	Bayside Shakedown: N.E.W	Takeshi Azumi		

=== Anime television ===
Year	Title	Role	Network	Ref.
2003	Astro Boy	Dr. Tenma, Shadow	Fuji TV	
2003	Black Jack Special: Inochi o meguru 4tsu no Kiseki	Judge	NTV	

=== Anime films ===
Year	Title	Role	Ref.
2005	Black Jack: The Two Doctors of Darkness	Goa	
2014	Buddha 2: Tezuka Osamu no Buddha ~Owarinaki Tabi~	Bimbisara	

=== Video games ===
Year	Title	Role	Ref.
2007	Crisis Core: Final Fantasy VII	Holland	
2022	Crisis Core: Final Fantasy VII Reunion	Holland	

=== Dubbing ===
Year	Title	Role	Notes	Ref.
1994	The Lion King	Mufasa		
1996	ER	Sam Gasner (Alan Rosenberg)		
2019	The Lion King	Mufasa		

== Supervision works ==
Year	Title	Notes	Ref.
2013	Kyōryū o Horou	Starring Hiroki Matsukata	

== Productions ==
Year	Title	Notes
	Hamlet o Ute!	Co-starring with Michiko Godai, Baku Owada, and Kumiko Okae
	Kurumi Watashi ga Aishita Hamlet	
2003	Aishino Juliet	
	Mouse Trap	
2006	Haru ni shite Kimi o Hanare	

== Discography ==
Year	Title	Notes	Ref.
1972	"Tomoyo"		
1993	"Tokimeite Ginza"	Duet with Hiroko Asakawa. Written by Eisei who was a former Shiseido director at the time, and the pen name of Hideyo Arita who is now Chairman of the Ginza Hanatsubaki Street Shoten Promotion Association. It became a hit after being released for 50,000 copies in December 1993.	
2016	"Matenrō Lullaby"		
