= Shiroi Kyotō =

1965 Japanese novel

- First edition
- Author: Toyoko Yamasaki
- Language: Japanese
- Publication date: 1965
- Publication place: Japan

Shiroi Kyotō (白い巨塔; lit. 'The White Tower') is a 1965 novel by Toyoko Yamasaki. It has been adapted into a film in 1966 and then five times as a television series in 1967, 1978, 1990, 2003, and 2019. The 1966 film was entered into the 5th Moscow International Film Festival where it won a Silver Prize.

== Summary ==
The story contrasts the life of two doctors, former classmates and now both associate professors at Naniwa University Hospital in Osaka. The brilliant and ambitious surgeon Goro Zaizen stops at nothing to rise to a position of eminence and authority, while the friendly Shuji Satomi busies himself with his patients and research.

== Cast (1966 film) ==
Shiroi Kyoto
- Directed by: Satsuo Yamamoto
- Written by: Shinobu Hashimoto; Toyoko Yamasaki (novel)
- Produced by: Masaichi Nagata
- Starring: Jiro Tamiya; Eijirō Tōno; Takahiro Tamura
- Cinematography: Nobuo Munekawa
- Music by: Sei Ikeno
- Distributed by: Daiei Film
- Release date: October 12, 1966
- Running time: 150 minutes
- Country: Japan
- Language: Japanese

=== Cast ===
- Jiro Tamiya - Goro Zaizen
- Eijirō Tōno - Professor Azuma
- Takahiro Tamura - Shuji Satomi
- Eitaro Ozawa - Professor Ugai
- Eiji Funakoshi - Professor Kikukawa
- Osamu Takizawa - Professor Funao
- Kenjiro Ishiyama - Mataichi Zaizen
- Yoshi Katō - Professor Ōkouchi
- Teruko Kishi - Masako
- Mayumi Ogawa - Keiko Hanamori
- Shiho Fujimura - Saeko
- Toshio Takahara - Tsukuda
- Mizuho Suzuki - Hitoshi Sekiguchi

=== Awards ===
5th Moscow International Film Festival

- Won: Silver Prize

17th Blue Ribbon Awards

- Won: Best Film Award
- Won: Best Screenplay Award

21st Mainichi Film Award

- Won: Best Director Award
- Won: Best Screenplay Award

== Cast (1967 TV series) ==
- Kei Satō - Goro Zaizen
- Jun Negami - Shuji Satomi
- Isao Yamagata - Professor Azuma

== Cast (1978 TV series) ==
- Jiro Tamiya - Goro Zaizen
- Gaku Yamamoto - Shuji Satomi
- Nobuo Nakamura - Professor Azuma
- Eitaro Ozawa - Professor Ugai
- Masakane Yonekura - Professor Kikukawa
- Shin Saburi - Professor Funao
- Meicho Soganoya - Mataichi Zaizen
- Yoshi Katō - Professor Ōkouchi
- Kō Nishimura - Kyosuke Takemura
- Nobuo Kaneko - Jukichi Iwata
- Eiji Okada - Seiichi Satomi
- Mieko Azuma - Masako Azuma
- Kiyoshi Kodama - Hitoshi Sekiguchi
- Kiwako Taichi - Keiko Hanamori
- Tamao Nakamura - Yoshie Sasaki
- Yoko Shimada - Saeko Azuma
- Tanie Kitabayashi - Ume Yamada
- Choichiro Kawarazaki - Tomohiro Tsukuda
- Iemasa Kayumi - Narrator

== Cast (1990 TV mini-series) ==
- Hiroaki Murakami - Goro Zaizen
- Mitsuru Hirata - Shuji Satomi
- Hideaki Nitani - Professor Azuma

== Cast (2003 TV series) ==
- Toshiaki Karasawa - Goro Zaizen
- Yōsuke Eguchi - Shuji Satomi
- Koji Ishizaka - Professor Azuma
- Hideaki Itō - Hiroshi Yanagihara
- Masato Ibu - Professor Ugai
- Toshiyuki Nishida - Mataichi Zaizen
- Mayumi Wakamura - Kyoko Zaizen
- Hitomi Kuroki - Keiko Hanamori
- Takaya Kamikawa - Hitoshi Sekiguchi
- Ikki Sawamura - Professor Kikukawa
- Tōru Shinagawa - Professor Ōkouchi
- Rino Katase - Yoshie Sasaki
- Atsuko Takahata - Masako Azuma
- Akiko Yada - Saeko Azuma
- Takeo Nakahara - Professor Funao
- Takatarō Kataoka - Tomohiro Tsukuda

== Cast (2019 TV mini-series) ==
- Junichi Okada - Goro Zaizen
- Kenichi Matsuyama - Shuji Satomi
- Akira Terao - Professor Azuma
- Erika Sawajiri - Keiko Hanamori
- Shinnosuke Mitsushima - Masahiro Yanagihara
- Yutaka Matsushige - Professor Ugai
- Kaoru Kobayashi - Mataichi Zaizen
- Kaho - Kyoko Zaizen
- Rie Mimura - Kimiko Kameyama
- Mikako Ichikawa - Natsumi Nosaka
- Ittoku Kishibe - Professor Ōkouchi
- Toshirō Yanagiba - Yōhei Sasaki
- Kayoko Kishimoto - Yoshie Sasaki
- Koji Mukai - Yōichi Sasaki
- Reiko Takashima - Masako Azuma
- Marie Iitoyo - Saeko Azuma
- Kippei Shiina - Professor Funao
- Norito Yashima - Tomohiro Tsukuda
- Takumi Saitoh - Tōru Sekiguchi
- Ikusaburo Yamazaki - Kōichirō Kunihira
- Wolfgang Riehm as Dr. Wolf

== Manga Adaptation ==
Illustrated by Jirō Andō, the manga adaptation was serialized in Monthly Comic Bunch (Shinchōsha) from the December 2018 issue to the May 2021 issue. The series spans a total of 25 chapters. Similar to recent screen adaptations, the setting has been updated to the contemporary era, with the story beginning in March 2018.

Jirō Andō, The Great White Tower, Shinchōsha (BUNCH COMICS), 5 volumes total:

1. 1 – Released on March 9, 2019, ISBN 978-4-10-772160-0
1. 2 – Released on May 9, 2019, ISBN 978-4-10-772182-2
1. 3 – Released on January 9, 2020, ISBN 978-4-10-772248-5
1. 4 – Released on May 8, 2021, ISBN 978-4-10-772386-4
1. 5 – Released on May 8, 2021, ISBN 978-4-10-772387-1

== Awards ==
21st Mainichi Film Award

- Won: Best Film

== See also ==
- White Tower (TV series), a 2007 South Korean television drama based on the same novel
