= Assassination Classroom (film) =

- Promotional release poster

Japanese name
- Kanji: 映画 暗殺教室
Transcriptions
- Revised Hepburn: Eiga Ansatsu Kyōshitsu
- Directed by: Eiichirō Hasumi
- Screenplay by: Tatsuya Kanazawa
- Based on: Assassination Classroom by Yūsei Matsui
- Produced by: Juichi Uehara
- Starring: Ryosuke Yamada; Masaki Suda; Maika Yamamoto; Kazunari Ninomiya; Kang Ji-young; Masanobu Takashima; Kippei Shiina
- Cinematography: Tomoo Ezaki
- Edited by: Hiroshi Matsuo
- Music by: Naoki Satō
- Distributed by: Toho
- Release date: March 21, 2015
- Running time: 110 minutes
- Country: Japan
- Language: Japanese
- Box office: $25 million

Assassination Classroom is a 2015 Japanese school science fiction action comedy film directed by Eiichirō Hasumi and based on the manga series of the same name by Yūsei Matsui. It was released in Japan on March 21, 2015. A sequel titled Assassination Classroom: Graduation was released in 2016.

== Plot ==
The movie opens with the Japanese military's failed attempt to capture whoever it is that has destroyed over 70% of the Moon, which sees the entire squad sent to capture it being attacked by a mysterious tentacled being.

Meanwhile, Nagisa Shiota, a ninth-grade student of Kunugigaoka Junior High School, narrates of how he came to be sent to the situation he is in: he is included in Class 3-E, which is reserved for delinquents and other undesirables of the school and is a laughing stock among the school. However, Class 3-E is actually a cover up for the Japanese government in their attempt to kill Koro-sensei, a tentacled mutant creature that apparently is responsible for the Moon's destruction. The students have to assassinate him before graduation, the time when he plans to destroy Earth, using special knives and BB pellets, but at the same time also have to study both academic and assassination disciplines from him. In teaching, Koro-sensei is assisted by the government-affiliated Tadaomi Karasuma and Irina Jelavić, a Serbian assassin.

Despite being fully aware that he is their ultimate target, Koro-sensei is able to bond with Class 3-E, who in turn regard him as their indispensable teacher. When asked why he took the job, he says it is done to fulfill a promise made to someone. Throughout the school term, Class 3-E welcomes three additional students: Karma Akabane, who has recently come out of his suspension due to protecting a former Class 3-E pupil from being bullied by Class 3-A students; "Ritsu", an AI-box displaying the form of a girl; and Itona Horibe, the also-tentacled self-proclaimed "blood brother" of Koro-sensei who is carried away from the school by his cloaked guardian after losing a match against the latter. At one time, Karasuma's position as P.E. teacher is briefly replaced by his rival, Akira Takaoka, a drill instructor-esque individual. Karasuma is then challenged by Takaoka to send a student to attack him with a tap of the knife. Karasuma then sends out Nagisa who successfully plants the tip of the knife on Takaoka, thereby expelling him from the school.

Before the finals, Koro-sensei promises that the top scorers of the five academic subjects (Chemistry, English, Home Economics, Japanese, and Maths) will be awarded chance to cut his rubber-like tentacles, which will greatly slow him. When the results for the finals are out, a total of six students are able to top the finals, including three students who got the first rank on the Home Economics test, thus granting the six the chance to cut Koro-sensei's tentacles. The students plan the killing during the summer holiday, where they reminisce about their kind past teacher, Aguri Yukimura. Eventually, Class 3-E manages to bind Koro-Sensei thanks to Nagisa's observation of his weakness: water. However, Koro-sensei transforms into a ball to avoid being killed. Suddenly, the class is interrupted by a vengeful Takaoka, who poisons several students. He agrees to trade the antidotes for Koro-sensei.

Nagisa and Karma team up to incapacitate Itona, now working for Takaoka, by luring him into open rain and subsequently cutting his tentacles. However, they are alerted by Ritsu that Takaoka has kidnapped Kaede Kayano and threatens to kill her unless Koro-sensei is handed over. With a trick, Class 3-E turns the table over and defeats Takaoka without giving in. Seeing that Koro-sensei is vulnerable, the government takes him and proceeds to do a public execution in front of his grieving students. However, he manages to survive the attempted killing and is allowed to continue teaching Class 3-E for the next term, with Itona now enrolling permanently. Koro-sensei then reminisces about the person he made his promise with: Aguri Yukimura.

== Cast ==
- Ryosuke Yamada as Nagisa Shiota
- Kazunari Ninomiya as Koro-sensei
- Masaki Suda as Karma Akabane
- Maika Yamamoto as Kaede Kayano
- Seika Taketomi as Rio Nakamura
- Mio Yūki as Yukiko Kanzaki
- Miku Uehara as Manami Okuda
- Kanna Hashimoto as Autonomous Intelligence "Ritsu" Fixed Artillery
- Seishiro Kato as Itona Horibe
- Mirei Kiritani as Aguri Yukimura (cameo)
- Wakana Aoi as Ayaka Saitō (斎藤 綾香, Saitō Ayaka)
- Kōtarō Yoshida as Kensaku Ōno (大野 健作, Ōno Kensaku)
- Takeo Nakahara as Gōki Onaga (尾長 剛毅, Onaga Gōki)
- Kang Ji-young as Irina Jelavić
- Masanobu Takashima as Akira Takaoka
- Kippei Shiina as Tadaomi Karasuma

== Production ==
The film was green-lit in June 2014 and filming began on August 31, 2014.

== Release ==
It was released in Japan on March 21, 2015, and debuted in the US at the Austin Fantastic Fest in September.

== Reception ==
Assassination Classroom topped the box office of Japan on its first opening week. It opened in 313 screens across Japan and earned $3.42 million on 351,000 admissions in its first weekend. It ultimately grossed over $20 million in Japan alone, and it ended its theatrical run with a worldwide gross of $25 million.

Film School Rejects awarded the film a score of B+, saying "Assassination Classroom is an absolute blast that not only survives its ridiculous setup but makes something truly special with it." Andrew Mack of Twitch Film said "This was the lighthearted and feel good Japanese film I was waiting for all festival long." The anime fanzine Otaku USA was more negative, saying: "As a piece of storytelling, Assassination Classroom felt more like a series of non-cohesive chapters than a fleshed-out whole, probably thanks to its manga origins."

== Music ==
The movie featured the theme song "Koro Sensations" by Sensations, a special unit made from members of Hey! Say! JUMP.

== Sequel ==
A sequel titled Assassination Classroom: Graduation was released on March 25, 2016.
