= Yamauchi Chiyo =

Japanese woman from the end of the Muromachi period to the early of the Edo period

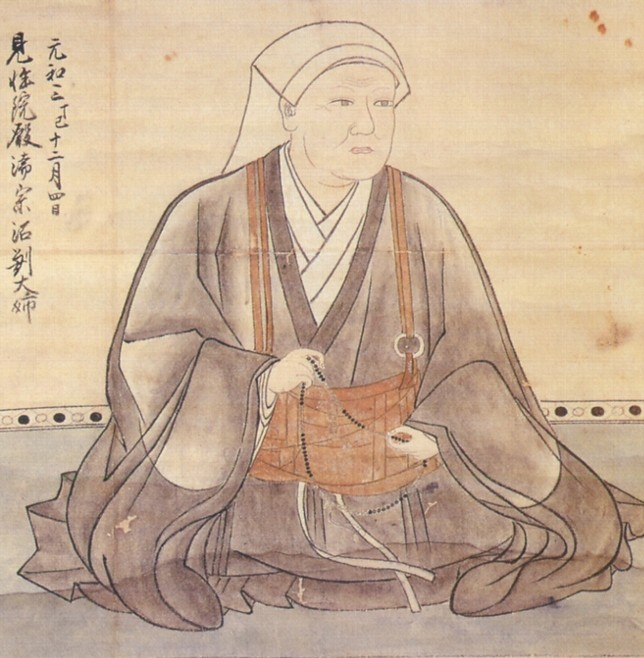
Portrait of Chiyo

Yamauchi Chiyo (山内千代) or Kenshōin (見性院, 1557 – 1617) was a Japanese noble lady from the Sengoku period to the early of the Edo period. Known in history for her dedication and devotion to her family, she was vitally important to the success of the Yamauchi clan, a samurai clan under the leadership of her husband, Yamauchi Kazutoyo. It is said that she was responsible for stabilizing the predominance of the Yamauchi clan, and the formation of the Tosa domain.

She was the daughter of Endo Morikazu, lord of Gujo-Hachiman castle. Her personal name is thought to have been Chiyo or Matsu, but there is no certainty. Becoming a Buddhist nun, she took the religious name of Kenshôin.

== Life ==
Chiyo was the daughter of Endo Morikazu of Gujo-Hachiman castle, a retainer of Azai clan. When their lord, Azai Nagamasa, married Oichi (sister of Oda Nobunaga), the Azai and the Oda clan entered into a political alliance. Because of this alliance, she married Yamauchi Katzutoyo, a minor samurai who served Oda Nobunaga. At that time, marriages between samurai families were only of a political nature.

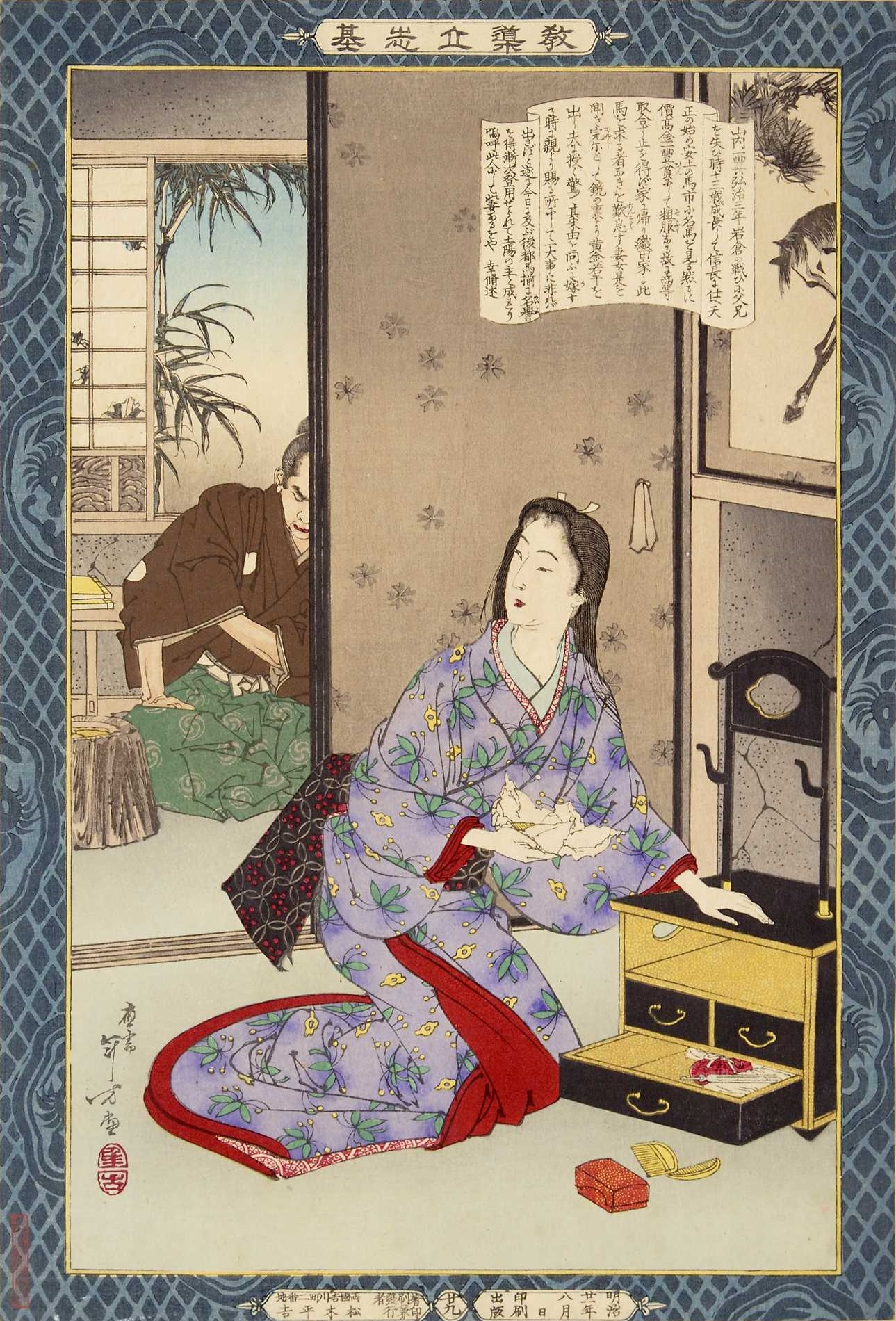
Chiyo, from the series Instruction in the Fundamentals of Success, Woodblock print by Toshitaka Mizuno.

When Chiyo married, her mother gave her a large sum of money - for "a matter of great importance". When Katzutoyo first left for war, he used to go to battle on foot or with an ordinary horse because he was in an inferior position in Oda's army. So Chiyo tried on her own to get a promotion for Katzutoyo, she gathered her fortune and traveled in search of a good horse. In times of war, it was rare to get a horse trained for battle due to intense demand. Chiyo spent her entire fortune on an extraordinary warhorse called Kagami Kurige. She did this right before a formal inspection of the troops by her overlord, Nobunaga.

The investment was extremely worthwhile, because by using the horse, Kazutoyo distinguished himself in battle. The horse won the admiration of Nobunaga, the most powerful warlord in Japan at the time. This led to the promotion of Kazutoyo and the growth of the Yamauchi clan's fortune. After these events, she continued to actively act for the growth and stabilization of her clan. She witnessed several important events of her time, The Murder of Oda Nobunaga in the Honnoji Incident, the execution of Akechi Mitsuhide at the Battle of Yamazaki and the rise of Toyotomi Hideyoshi.

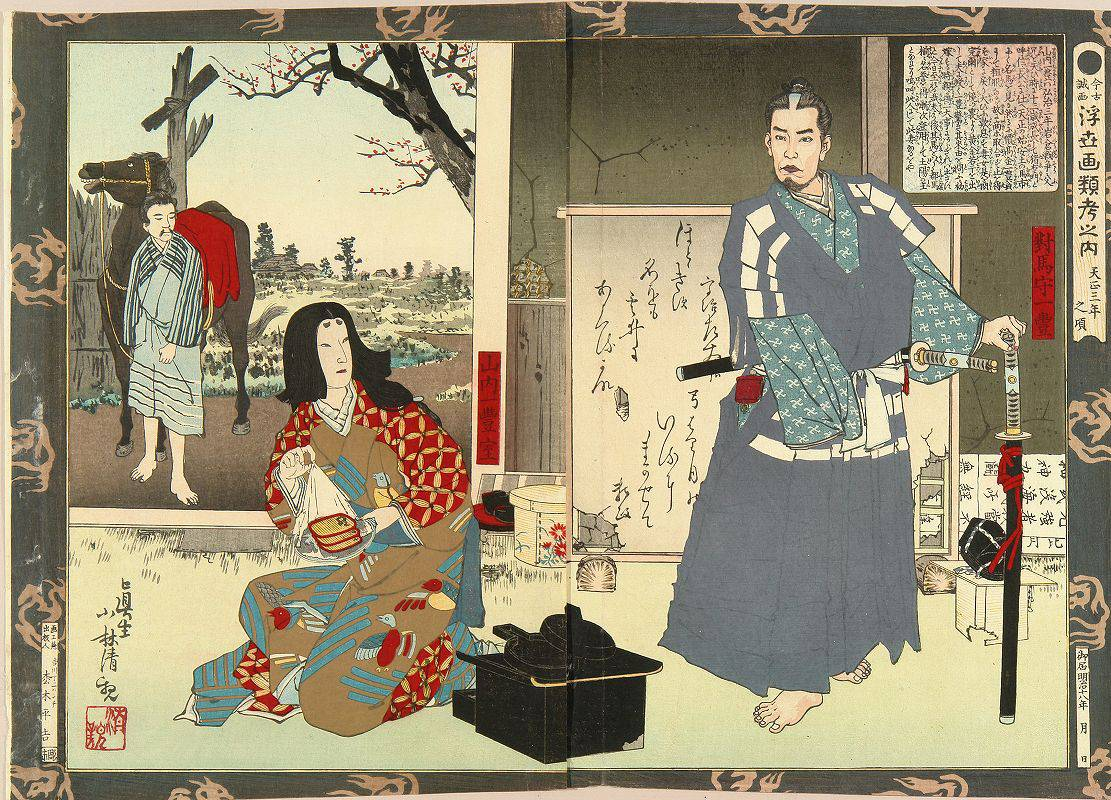
Chiyo's and her husband by Kobayashi Kiyochika.

After Toyotomi Hideyoshi died, Japan entered a period of war again. Later, prior to the Battle of Sekigahara (1600), while Chiyo was held a political hostage by Ishida Mitsunari of Western army, she sent secret letters with important information to the Tokugawa Ieyasu's Eastern Army. Chiyo was forced to support Mitsunari while Kazutoyo was beside Ieyasu. She was taken hostage to force Kazutoyo to join the Western army, which is why Ieyasu suspected Yamauchi's loyalty.

Although Chiyo was supervised by Ishida Mitsunari, she continued to send secret letters with important information, letting the Tokugawa's supporters know Mitsunari's raising of troops right before the Battle of Sekigahara. When sending letters to the Eastern army, she sent a letter to her husband saying, "Don't worry about me, do what you have to do." Furthermore, she never allowed her husband to open the letter, she just asked him to hand it over to Ieyasu and show his loyalty. Thanks to Chiyo's sagacity, Kazutoyo won Ieyasu's credibility. The Yamauchi clan would be richly rewarded after the battle, when Ieyasu awarded Kazutoyo with Tosa Domain. It is often said that the foundation of Tosa domain was due to Chiyo's heroic actions. Kazutoyo exalted his wife by saying, "If it weren't for Chiyo, I would have never been able to make my name known in this country."

Yamauchi Kazutoyo never took a concubine, though it was a known tradition for samurai, and he never left Chiyo although she was only able to have one child, a girl named Yonehime. Chiyo survived the entire Sengoku period, dying in 1617, two years after the Siege of Osaka.

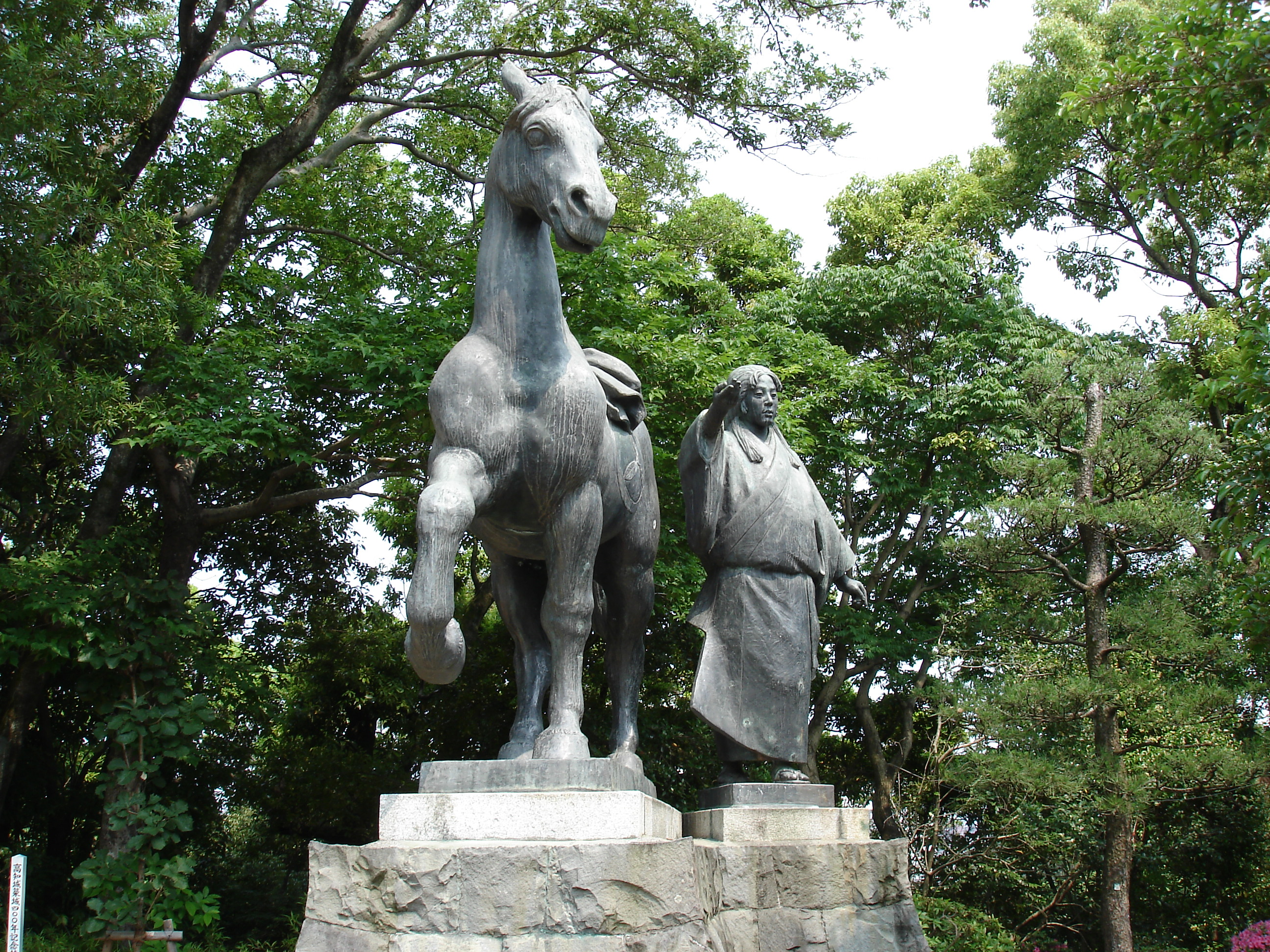
Statue of Yamauchi Chiyo and the warhorse.

== Legacy ==
Chiyo and Kazutoyo are one of the most celebrated samurai couples in Japan. Their loyalty and their determination to survive the period of war have eternalized the couple in history. Due to her virtuous character, Chiyo was honored in paintings, poems and popular culture.

Reproductions of Chiyo's image can be found in a number of places; a bronze statue of her and the horse she gave her husband, which stands near the ascent to Kochi Castle, close a statue of her husband on horseback and full armor; a bronze statue of her, holding the reins of the horse, and her husband, located in the park below Gujo Hachiman castle in Gifu Prefecture; and a portrait of her in retirement, wearing the garb of a Bhikkhuni. There a shrine dedicated to Chiyo and Kazutoyo for strong marriage.

== In drama ==
The 45th NHK Taiga drama (2006) is a dramatization of the life of Chiyo and Kazutoyo as the central character. Kōmyō-ga-tsuji: Yamauchi Kazutoyo no Tsuma stars Nakama Yukie as Chiyo. The story tells how Yamauchi Chiyo, as a wise and beautiful wife, helped her husband Yamauchi Kazutoyo up from an ordinary samurai to the governor of an entire province, Tosa. The story is by Shiba Ryōtarō.

== Family ==
- Father: Endo Morikazu
- Husband: Yamauchi Kazutoyo
- Daughter: Yonehime (1580–1586)
- Adopted:
  - Shonan Shoka (1586–1637)
  - Yamauchi Tadayoshi (1592–1665)
