= Ryō (actress) =

Japanese actress and model (born 1973)

Ryō りょう
- Born: Yumiko Miyata; January 17, 1973 (age 53); Kawaguchi, Saitama Prefecture, Japan
- Occupations: Actress, model
- Years active: 1996–present
- Spouse: Toshi-Low (m. 2003)
- Children: 2
- Website: https://www.ken-on.co.jp/ryo/

Ryō (りょう) (born January 17, 1973) is a Japanese model, actress, voice actress and former singer whose birth name is Yumiko Miyada (宮田 ゆみ子, Miyada Yumiko).

== Filmography ==
=== Film ===
- Food Luck (2020), Yasue Sato
- All the Long Nights (2024), Noriko Fujisawa

=== Television ===
- Long Vacation (1996), Rumiko Himuro
- Dr. Storks (2017), Akiyo Tsuji (ep. 10)
- Human Crossing (2003), Shoko Aochi (ep. 13)
- Taira no Kiyomori (2012), Taikenmon'in no Horikawa
- Manager Rinko Kazehana's Love (2018), Rinko Kazehana
- Inugamike no Ichizoku (2018), Umeko Inugami
- Kurotokage (2019), Lady Midorikawa / Black Lizard
- Byplayers Season 3 (2021), Herself
- Kindaichi Shonen no Jikenbo 5 (2022), Kyoka Himekoji (Ep. 4)
- Patient Chart Prayer (2022), Saeko Momoi
- Kissing the Ring Finger (2023), Momoko Haneda
- Tokyo Woman (2023), Kanako Terauchi
- Ignite (2025), Ryoko Asami
- Learning to Love (2025), Nao Kosaka
- Mikaiketsu no Onna: Keishichou Bunsho Sousakan Season 3 (2026), Atsuko Iwashita
- Loved One (2026), Akiko Serizawa (ep. 10)

=== Video games ===
- Chaos Legion (2003), Siela Riviere

=== Dubbing ===
- Lightyear (2022), Alisha Hawthorne

== Discography ==
=== Albums ===
- Belladonna (ベラドンナ) (1997)
- Indigo Blue (1998)

=== Singles ===
- "Hints of Love" (1996) (arranged and co-produced by Nile Rodgers)
- "Hysteric Candy" (1997)
- "Belladonna" (ベラドンナ) (1997) (lyrics by singer/actress Kaori Moriwaka)
- "Kiete yo" (キエテヨ, Disappear) (1997) (produced by Chara)
