= Yamauchi Kazutoyo =

Daimyo

- 山内 一豊
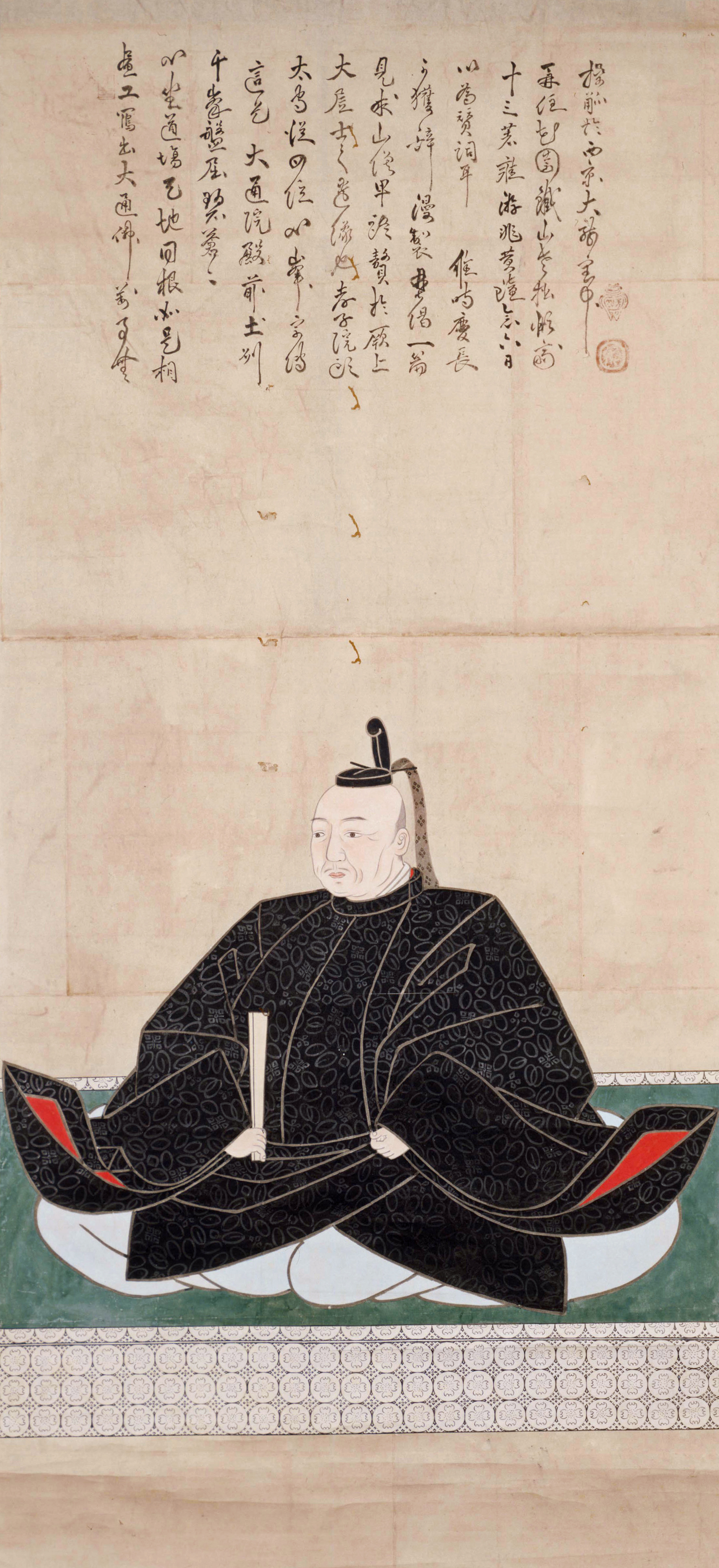

Lord of Kakegawa
- In office 1590–1600
- Succeeded by: Matsudaira Sadakatsu

Lord of Tosa
- In office 1601–1605
- Preceded by: Chōsokabe Morichika
- Succeeded by: Yamauchi Tadayoshi

Personal details
- Born: 1546? Owari Province, Japan
- Died: November 1, 1605 Kōchi, Japan
- Spouse: Yamauchi Chiyo

Military service
- Allegiance: Oda clan Toyotomi clan Eastern army
- Battles/wars: Battle of Anegawa (1570); Battle of Yamasaki (1582); Battle of Shizugatake (1583); Battle of Komaki-Nagakute (1584); Siege of Odawara (1590); Battle of Sekigahara (1600)

Yamauchi Kazutoyo (山内 一豊; やまうち かつとよ), also pronounced Yamanouchi (1545/1546? – November 1, 1605), was a retainer of Oda Nobunaga and later Toyotomi Hideyoshi. His father Yamauchi Moritoyo was a descendant of Fujiwara no Hidesato, a senior retainer of the Iwakura Oda clan (opposed to Oda Nobunaga) and lord of Kuroda castle in Owari Province at the end of the Sengoku period of Japan. He was famous as the husband of Yamauchi Chiyo.

== Military life ==
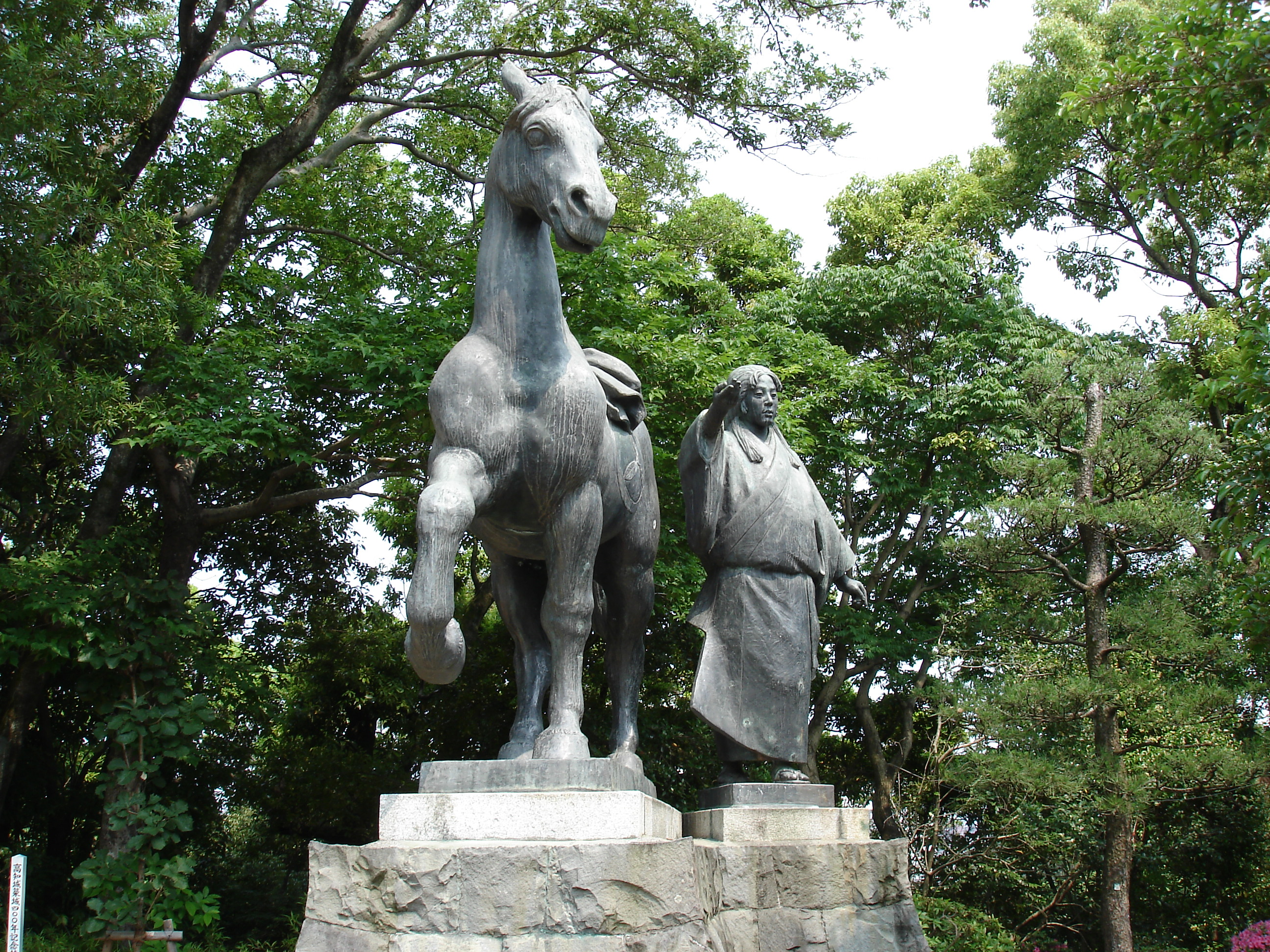
Statue of Yamauchi Chiyo with the horse she gave to her husband

When he was still a 400-Koku lord, many great people as children were entrusted to him, such as Kuroda Nagamasa when he was hostage of Oda Nobunaga and Toyotomi Hidetsugu were taught by him.

He participated at Battle of Anegawa 1570 in the Oda's side. After the Siege of Odawara (1590) and the rise to power of Toyotomi Hideyoshi, Tokugawa Ieyasu was forced to trade his domains in the Tōkai region for the Kantō region instead. Kazutoyo was relinquished Kakegawa Castle from Hideyoshi.

In 1600, Kazutoyo fought at the Battle of Sekigahara on Tokugawa Ieyasu's side. After battle, Kazutoyo built Kōchi Castle in what was then the province of Tosa. Kazutoyo held the title of Tosa no kami. His life spanned the closing years of the Sengoku period, the Azuchi–Momoyama period, and the beginning of the Edo period.

Just four years after he became Lord of Tosa, Kazutoyo died without issue aged around 60, and was succeeded as Lord of Tosa by his nephew Tadayoshi.

== Family ==
- Father: Yamauchi Moritoyo (1510-1559)
- Mother: Hoshuin (d.1586)

Kazutoyo's success was mainly thanks to his shrewd and loyal wife Yamauchi Chiyo, who secured his promotion by spending all her money on a magnificent thoroughbred horse for him to impress his superiors. When they were separated during the war, Chiyo also risked her life to provide her husband with secret information. Kazutoyo's daughter, Yonehime, was killed during the 1586 Tenshō earthquake.

- Wife: Endo Chiyo (1557-1617) later Genshoin, daughter of Endo Morikazu, lord of Gujo-Hachiman castle
- Daughter: Yonehime (1580-1586)
- Adopted:
  - Shonan Shoka (1586-1637)
  - Yamauchi Tadayoshi (1592-1665)

== In drama ==
The 45th NHK Taiga drama (2006) is a dramatization of the life of Kazutoyo, with his wife Chiyo as the central character. Kōmyō ga Tsuji stars Nakama Yukie as Chiyo. Takaya Kamikawa plays Kazutoyo. The story tells how Yamauchi Chiyo, as a wise and beautiful wife, helped her husband Yamauchi Kazutoyo up from an ordinary samurai to the governor of an entire province, Tosa. The story is by Shiba Ryōtarō.

Preceded by Hashiba Hideyoshi	Daimyō of Nagahama; 1585–1590	Succeeded by Naitō Nobunari
Preceded by none	Daimyō of Kakegawa; 1590–1600	Succeeded by Matsudaira Sadakatsu
Preceded by Chōsokabe Morichika	Daimyō of Tosa; 1601–1605	Succeeded by Yamauchi Tadayoshi
