= Takaya Kamikawa =

Japanese actor (born 1965)

- 上川 隆也
- Born: 7 May 1965 (age 61); Hachiōji, Tokyo, Japan
- Occupation: Actor
- Years active: 1989–present
- Agent: Zero Light Years
- Website: kamikawatakaya.com

Takaya Kamikawa (Japanese: 上川 隆也, Hepburn: Kamikawa Takaya; born May 7, 1965) is a Japanese stage, film, and television actor.

== Biography ==
Kamikawa was born in Hachioji, Tokyo in 1965. He graduated from Hachioji-Kita high school in Tokyo. While studying economics in Chuo University, he acted in a minor theatrical group which was touring around Japan and performing at local schools. Kamikawa left Chuo University without a diploma, and joined the group Caramel Box to become a full-time actor.

In 1995, Kamikawa starred in a TV drama by NHK, Daichi no Ko, and played the leading role, Lu Yixin. The original author, Toyoko Yamasaki, initially wanted Masahiro Motoki to play the role. However, since most of the drama was filmed in China and required a lot of travel, Motoki was not able to meet the tight filming schedule. Then one of the staff found Kamikawa, who was still unknown, in a magazine. Toyoko Yamasaki later commented that Kamikawa had been the right choice.

In 2006, he played Yamauchi Kazutoyo, the leading role of the NHK Taiga drama Kōmyō ga Tsuji.

== Filmography ==
=== Television ===
Year	Title	Role	Notes	Source
1995	Daichi no Ko	Lu Yixin	Lead role	
1997	Mōri Motonari	Mōri Takamoto	Taiga drama	
1999–2001	Omizu no Hanamichi	Shuichi Ishizaki	2 seasons	
2000	Cinderella wa Nemuranai	Yoshinori		
2000	Kimi ga Oshiete Kureta Koto	Shinichi Sayama		
2003	The Great White Tower	Hitoshi Sekiguchi		
2006	Kōmyō ga Tsuji	Yamauchi Kazutoyo	Lead role; Taiga drama	
2010	Ryōmaden	Nakaoka Shintarō	Taiga drama	
2012	Taira no Kiyomori	Taira no Morikuni	Taiga drama	
2015	Angel Heart	Ryo Saeba	Lead role	
2018	BG Personal Bodyguard	Goro Murata		
2019	No Side Manager	Keiichiro Takigawa		
2023	The Last Man: The Blind Profiler	Kyogo Godo		
2024	Believe: A Bridge to You	Kazuo Hayashi		

=== Film ===
Year	Title	Role	Notes	Source
1997	Tokyo Lullaby	Sadaji Asakawa		
1999	Owls' Castle	Gohei Kazama		
2025	The Last Man: The Movie – First Love	Kyogo Godo		

=== Television animation ===
Year	Title	Role	Notes	Source
2007	Gurren Lagann	Anti-Spiral		
2017	Kado: The Right Answer	Narrator		
2018	Lupin the 3rd Part V: Misadventures in France	Enzo Bron		
2021	Star Wars: Visions - The Village Bride	Vaan		

=== Animated films ===
Year	Title	Role	Notes	Source
2009	Gurren Lagann the Movie	Anti-Spiral		
2011	Naruto the Movie: Blood Prison	Maroi		
2013	The Tale of the Princess Kaguya	Prince Ishitsukuri		
2025	Batman Ninja vs. Yakuza League	Kuraku Hagane		

=== Video games ===
Year	Title	Role	Notes	Source
2008	Professor Layton and the Unwound Future	Stun Gun, Allen Dimitri	DS	

=== Japanese dubbing ===
Year	Title	Role	Notes	Source
2016	Finding Dory	Hank		

== Awards and nominations ==
Year	Award	Category	Work(s)	Result	Source
1997	21st Elan d'or Awards	Newcomer of the Year	Himself	Won	
1998	21st Japan Academy Film Prize	Newcomer of the Year	Tokyo Lullaby	Won	
1999	2nd Nikkan Sports Drama Grand Prix	Best Supporting Actor	Omizu no Hanamichi	Won	
2000	3rd Nikkan Sports Drama Grand Prix	Best Supporting Actor	Cinderella wa Nemuranai	Won	
2000	23rd Japan Academy Film Prize	Best Supporting Actor	Owls' Castle	Nominated	
2001	4th Nikkan Sports Drama Grand Prix	Best Supporting Actor	Kimi ga Oshiete Kureta Koto	Won	
2002	5th Nikkan Sports Drama Grand Prix	Best Supporting Actor	Omizu no Hanamichi (S2)	Won	
2004	7th Nikkan Sports Drama Grand Prix	Best Supporting Actor	Shiroi Kyotō	Won	
