= Cherry Blossom Memories =

Japanese musical drama film

- Poster

Japanese name
- Kanji: 桜ノ雨
Transcriptions
- Revised Hepburn: Sakura no Ame
- Directed by: Atsushi Ueda
- Screenplay by: Hirotoshi Kobayashi
- Story by: halyosy
- Based on: Sakura no Ame (novel) and "Sakura no Ame" (song) by halyosy
- Starring: Maika Yamamoto; Kōdai Asaka
- Cinematography: Shin Hayasaka
- Release dates: October 29, 2015 (Tokyo); March 5, 2016
- Running time: 97 minutes
- Country: Japan
- Language: Japanese

Cherry Blossom Memories is a 2015 Japanese youth drama music film directed by Atsushi Ueda, written by Hirotoshi Kobayashi and starring Maika Yamamoto and Kōdai Asaka. It is based on Sakura no Ame, a 2012 novel based on the 2008 Hatsune Miku song of the same title by halyosy. It had its world premiere at the Panorama section of the 28th Tokyo International Film Festival on October 29, 2015. It was released in Japan on March 5, 2016.

== Plot ==
Miku is a 2nd year high school student. Her school is located on the beach of a small town. She is a member of the school's chorus club. Miku is introverted, but likes singing and has feelings for Haru, the head of the chorus club. One day, Teacher Meiko, the advisor of the chorus club, decides to retire. For the last chorus competition during Teacher Meiko's tenure, she hopes the chorus club can win first place. Teacher Meiko selects a difficult song for the chorus competition which the students didn't expect. The students want to sing “Sakura no Ame” for the competition. Dissension grows within the chorus club.

== Cast ==
- Maika Yamamoto as Miku Tono
- Kōdai Asaka as Haru Sakurane
- Ryōhei Hirota as Ren Kitamura
- Ikumi Hisamitsu as Ruka Mitsuki
- Tōko Miura as Yuri Kashiima
- Daiki Nakamura
- Tomoko Tabata as Meiko Takada
- Kaoru Okunuki as Midori Tono

== See also ==
- Zutto Mae Kara Suki Deshita (2016), another film based on Vocaloid songs
- Kagerou Project, an anime series also based on Vocaloid songs
