= Ken Ishiguro =

Japanese actor (born 1966)

- Born: 31 January 1966 (age 60); Tokyo, Japan
- Occupation: Actor
- Years active: 1979–present

Ken Ishiguro (石黒 賢, Ishiguro Ken; born 31 January 1966) is a Japanese film, television and voice actor. He has appeared in more than 80 films since 1979.

He is the son of Osamu Ishiguro, a former tennis player.

== Selected filmography ==
=== Film ===
Year	Title	Role	Notes	Ref.
2000	Isola	Kazuhiko Manabe		
2019	The Confidence Man JP: The Movie	Jōgasaki		
2019	Toki no Kōro		Lead role	
2020	The Confidence Man JP: Episode of the Princess	Jōgasaki		
2020	Food Luck			
2020	The Legacy of Dr. Death: Black File			
2021	Masquerade Night	Yusaku Ujihara		
2021	Belle	Kei's father (voice)		
2022	The Confidence Man JP: Episode of the Hero	Jōgasaki		
2022	Ware Yowakereba: Yajima Kajiko-den	Yajima Naokata		
2022	Soul at Twenty	Takanori Kimura		
2024	School Meals Time: Road to Ikameshi	Todoroki		
2026	Vivant: The Movie	Damdin		

=== Television ===
Year	Title	Role	Notes	Ref.
1993	He Is Always There	Gen Ishikawa	Lead role	
1994	Furuhata Ninzaburō	Kiyoshi Kuroda	Episode 9	
2004	Shinsengumi!	Katsura Kogorō	Taiga drama	
2021	The Grand Family	Shoichi Mikumo		
2021	Nemesis	Takeru Yamato		
2023	Fixer	Saburō Yokomiya	Season 2	
