= Maika Yamamoto =

Japanese actress, model, and television personality (born 1997)

- 山本 舞香
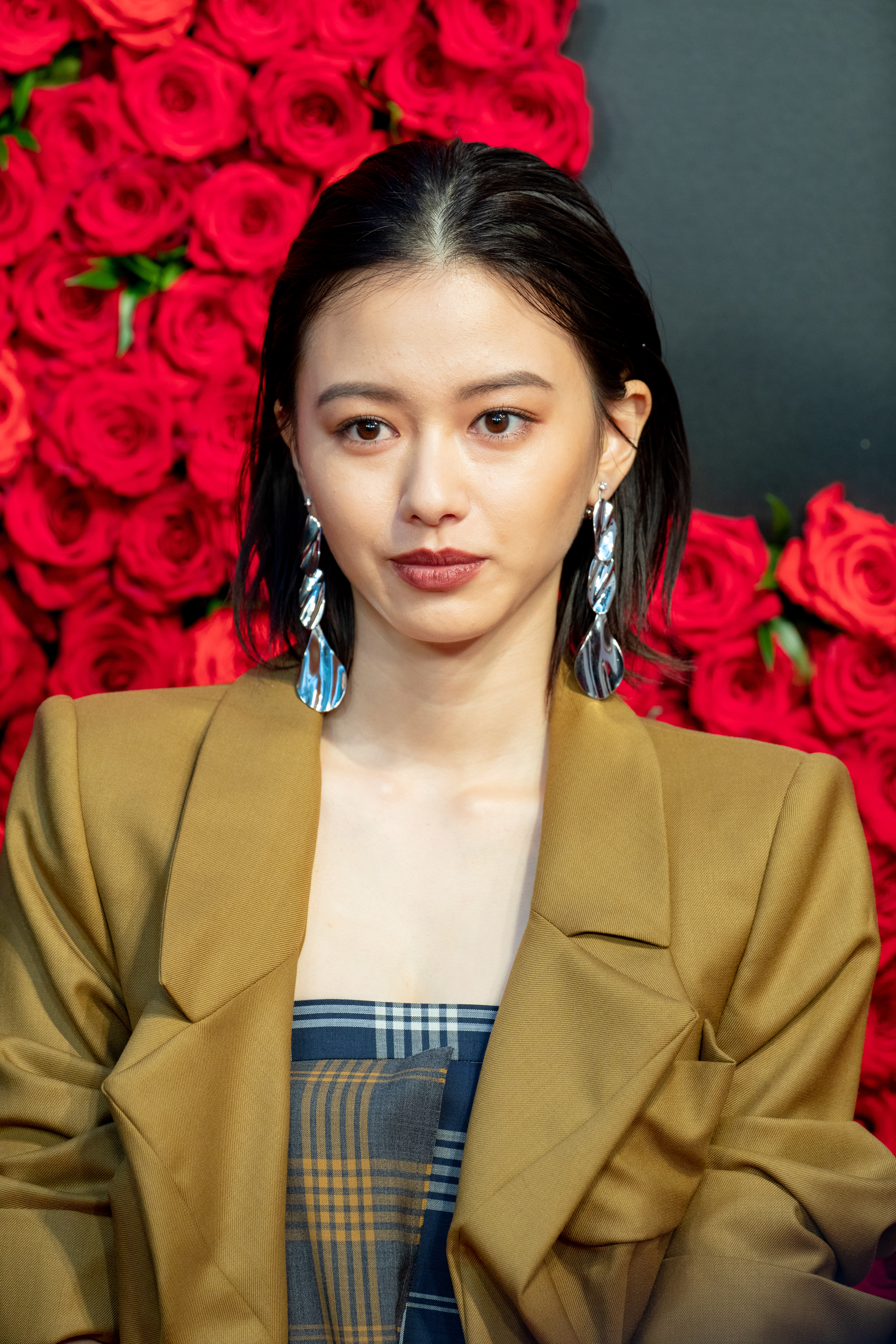
- Yamamoto at the Tokyo International Film Festival in 2018
- Born: 13 October 1997 (age 29); Yonago, Tottori, Japan
- Other names: Maika Moriuchi (after marriage)
- Occupations: Actress; model; TV personality
- Years active: 2011–present
- Employer: Biz
- Notable work: Minami-kun no Koibito (2015); Assassination Classroom (2015)
- Height: 155 cm (5 ft 1 in)
- Spouse: Hiroki Moriuchi (m. 2024)
- Children: 1
- Relatives: Kazuhiro Moriuchi (father-in-law); Masako Mori (mother-in-law); Takahiro Moriuchi (brother-in-law)

Maika Yamamoto (山本 舞香, Yamamoto Maika; born 13 October 1997) is a Japanese actress, TV personality, and fashion model. She is known for her roles as Kaede Kayano in Assassination Classroom, Chiyomi Horikiri in the 2015 television drama Minami-kun no Koibito, and Mizuki Kurata in the 2018 film adaptation of the manga series After the Rain, among others.

== Early life and career ==
Yamamoto was born in 1997 in Yonago, Tottori Prefecture. She has an elder brother and a younger brother. She made her entertainment debut as the 14th Mitsui ReHouse Girl in 2011. Her first acting role came in 2011 in the Fuji TV series Soredemo, Ikite Yuku. At the age of 15 she moved to Tokyo to attend private high school while pursuing an acting career. In 2015 she played the role of Kaede Kayano in Assassination Classroom, the film adaptation of Yūsei Matsui's manga. That same year she played the lead role of Chiyomi Horikiri, a young dancer and writer who shrinks in size, in the 2015 Fuji TV adaptation of the Shungicu Uchida manga Minami-kun no Koibito.

Yamamoto was an exclusive model for nicola as a teenager. Her first photobook was published by Kodansha in March 2018.

== Personal life ==
On October 13, 2024, My First Story's lead vocalist Hiro announced his marriage to Yamamoto through his official social media post in the caption. On May 5, 2026, she announced that she was pregnant with her first child. On August 7, she gave birth to her first child.

== Filmography ==
=== Films ===
Year	Title	Role	Notes	Ref.
2013	Madam Marmalade no Ijō na Nazo: Question			
2013	Madam Marmalade no Ijō na Nazo: Answer			
2014	Kamen Teacher: The Movie	Saeko Kobayashi		
2015	Z Island	Hyuga		
2015	Assassination Classroom	Kaede Kayano		
2016	Assassination Classroom: Graduation	Kaede Kayano		
2016	Cherry Blossom Memories	Miku Tono	Lead role	
2016	The Magnificent Nine	Natsu		
2017	Daytime Shooting Star	Yuyuka Nekota		
2017	The Blue Hearts	Ayano Yoshida	"Love Letter" segment	
2017	Teen Bride	Saaya Matsui		
2018	After the Rain	Mizuki Kurata		
2018	Sunny: Our Hearts Beat Together	Ito Serika (young)		
2018	Gangoose	Yuki		
2019	Tokyo Ghoul S	Tōka Kirishima		
2019	Brave Father Online: Our Story of Final Fantasy XIV	Miki		
2020	Tonkatsu DJ Agetarō	Sonoko Hattori		
2020	From Today, It's My Turn the Movie	Ryoko Morikawa		
2022	Re/Member	Rumiko Hiiragi		
2023	See Hear Love	Saori Nakamura		

=== Television dramas ===
Year	Title	Role	Notes	Ref.
2011	Still, Life Goes On	Young Futaba Toyama		
2011	Gō	Sada	Taiga drama	
2012	Job Guidance for the 13-year-olds and all triers	Maho Tamura		
2012	Kazoku no Uta	Nozomi Miki	Episodes 5 and 7	
2012	Ōoku: The Inner Chambers	Nono	Episodes 8-10	
2013	Shinryochu: In the Room (心療中 in the Room)	Tomoka Tenma		
2013	Mahoro Eki Mae Bangaichi	Sonoko Ashihara		
2013	Ghostly Girl	Risa Kyozuka		
2013	Kamen Teacher	Saeko Kobayashi		
2013	49	Sachi Takami		
2014	Night Teacher	Rei Ogami		
2015	Minami-kun no Koibito: My Little Lover	Chiyomi Horikiri	Lead role	
2016	Yassan	Misaki		
2017	SR Saitama's Rapper: Mike's Lane	Toko		
2018	We Are Rockets!	Maki Shibata		
2018	Could Have Done It Committee	Nobuko Machida	Episode 5	
2019	Scams	Misaki Azuma		
2021–23	Kotaro Lives Alone	Mizuki Akitomo	2 seasons	
2024	Believe: A Bridge to You	Erina Motomiya		
2024	Omusubi	Sachi Yabuki	Asadora	
2025	A Calm Sea and Beautiful Days with You	Fumiko Yoshimori		

=== Dubbing ===
- Bullet Train, The Prince (Joey King)
