= Believe: A Bridge to You =

2024 Japanese television series

Japanese name
- Kanji: Believe-君にかける橋
- Written by: Yumiko Inoue
- Country of origin: Japan
- Original language: Japanese
- No. of episodes: 9

Original release
- Network: TV Asahi
- Release: April 25 – June 20, 2024

Believe: A Bridge to You (Japanese: Believe-君にかける橋, Believe: Kimi ni Kakeru Hashi) is a Japanese television drama series written by Yumiko Inoue, starring Takuya Kimura. It aired first in April 2024 on TV Asahi, as a work commemorating the 65th anniversary of the TV station.

== Synopsis ==
Riku Kariyama (Takuya Kimura) worked in Teiwa Construction and was involved in the construction of the Ryujin Bridge for several years. However, nearing the completion of the project, a collapse occurred. Kariyama was arrested because of a design error, and was sentenced to prison.

== Broadcast ==
The first episode was broadcast on April 25, 2024, in Japan, every Thursday, and the final episode on June 20, 2024. At the end of the final episode, it had been viewed 25 million times, making it the drama with the highest viewership among the station's Thursday dramas.

The Blu-ray & DVD BOX of the drama is slated to be released on January 29, 2025.

== Cast ==
Actor	Role	Age	Description
Takuya Kimura	Riku Kariyama (狩山陸)	50	Head of civil engineering design department in Teiwa Construction
Ryoma Takeuchi	Masaoki Kuroki (黑木正興)	34	Detective in Tokyo Metropolitan Police
Maika Yamamoto	Erina Motomiya (本宮繪里菜)	25	Employee in Teiwa Construction, Nagumo's fiancee
Hayate Ichinose	Daiki Nagumo (南雲大樹)	32	Supervisor of first design division in Teiwa Construction, Erina's fiance
Kinya Kitaoji (special appearance)	Goro Bando (坂東五郎)	70	President of Bando Gumi
Takaya Kamikawa	Kazuo Hayashi (林一夫)	59	Head of National Prison Department
Takumi Saito	Yoshihito Akizawa (秋澤良人)	42	Lawyer
Fumiyo Kohinata	Noritaka Isoda (磯田典孝)	65	President and CEO of Teiwa Construction
Yuki Amami	Reiko Kariyama (狩山玲子)	53	Head nurse in Seishu University Hospital, Kariyama's wife
