= Food Luck =

- Film poster

Japanese name
- Kanji: フード・ラック!食運
Transcriptions
- Revised Hepburn: Food・Luck!Shoku un
- Directed by: Jimon Terakado
- Written by: Kumiko Motoyama
- Story by: Terakado Jimon; Reiko Takahashi(story assistant)
- Produced by: Takeshi Udakata; Tetsuyo Hayashi; Hirofumi Yamabe
- Starring: Naoto; Tao Tsuchiya
- Music by: Amar
- Distributed by: Shochiku
- Release date: 20 November 2020
- Running time: 104 minutes
- Country: Japan
- Language: Japanese

Food Luck is a 2020 Japanese drama film written and directed by Jimon Terakado of the comedy trio Dachou Club. The plot centers on Yoshito Sato, a freelance writer who was born into a family that ran a popular yakiniku restaurant and now embarks on a food journey to find the flavors of home, with young reporter Shizuka Takenaka. It stars Naoto and Tao Tsuchiya, with Ken Ishiguro, Satoru Matsuo, Yasufumi Terawaki, Hakuryu and Ryo in supporting roles. Some scenes were shot in several actual yakiniku restaurants around Japan that Terakado Jimon loved and recommended as a gourmet.

The film premiered at the Tokyo International Film Festival on November 4, 2020, then received a national release in Japan on November 20, 2020. It was set to be released in Hong Kong on May 6 and in Taiwan on June 18, 2021.

== Plot ==
Yoshito's mother, Yasue, runs the yakiniku (grilled meat) restaurant "Negishi-en" by herself, which was the only memento left to her by her husband, who died. For Yasue, running the restaurant with only her hands, raising her son, and serving home-cooked food with love is a happy time. For Yoshito, too, eating delicious home-cooked food was a time of bliss.

Although Negishi-en was loved by the public, the number of customers decreased drastically due to an untrue article written by Furuyama, a popular gourmet critic. Just as the restaurant was starting to come back to life after the shock, young Yoshito decided to do something to free his mother from her busy life and spend more time with him.

Eighteen years later, Yoshihito runs away from home and works as a dull freelance writer. One day, he and his editor, Shizuka Takenaka, are asked to launch a new gourmet information website that collects only "real" food. The theme of the first project is the ill-fated yakiniku.

Yoshito decides to take on the job, but as he struggles with his work, he receives news that his estranged mother Yasue has collapsed. Unable to prepare himself to see Yasue on her sickbed, Yoshihito encounters the nostalgic taste of Negishien at many of the famous restaurants he visits for interviews. He enjoys the food there, and begins to understand his mother's feelings through his relationships with people. Through these connections with people, he learns about his mother's thoughts and feelings, and a change occurs within Yoshihito.

Yoshito, who is guided by "food luck," discovers a miracle of sorts in the end.

== Cast ==
- Naoto as Yoshito Sato
- Tao Tsuchiya as Shizuka Takenaka
- Ken Ishiguro as Eiji Shinsei
- Satoru Matsuo as Tatsuya Furuyama
- Yasufumi Terawaki as Tomohiro Yamada
- Hakuryu as Jiro Takizawa
- Chizuru Azuma as Sayuri Takizawa
- Toshihiro Yashiba as Takahiro Nishida
- Miwako Kakei as Ryoko Matoba
- Yo Oizumi (special appearance) as Minoru Ozaki
- Shinya Owada as Tadayoshi Toyokawa
- Raita Ryū as Yuji Ishihara
- Ryo as Yasue Sato

== Release ==
After its premiere at the Tokyo International Film Festival on November 4, 2020, the film was released in Japan on November 20, 2020. It was set to be released in Hong Kong and in Taiwan on May 6 and June 18, 2021, respectively.

=== Marketing ===
Food Luck was announced on November 29, 2019, as the first film directed by gourmet Jimon Terakado, while it was revealed on the same time that it would be a film based on his rich experience in food and focus on yakiniku. On July 29, 2020, Naoto and Tao Tsuchiya was announced to star the film together, with the arrival of the first trailer. Ken Ishiguro, Satoru Matsuo, Yasufumi Terawaki, Hakuryu and Ryo was also announced to appear in the film. The poster was released on August 29, and Ketsumeishi was announced to sing the theme song. On November 4, 2020, Naoto, Tao Tsuchiya, and director Jimon Terakado attended the premiere of the film after they attended the red carpet event of Tokyo International Film Festival on October 31. A greeting event celebrating the release of the film was held in Tokyo on November 21, 2020, with Naoto and Tao Tsuchiya, Ken Ishiguro and Jimon Terakado attending. On November 29, another special greeting event that celebrated the release of the film was held in a cinema in Tokyo. Naoto and Tao Tsuchiya attended the event together, both wearing Studio Seven, a fashion brand ran by Naoto himself.

== Reception ==
=== Critical Review ===
The film was well received by the public and critics, ranking No. 1 in Yahoo! Movie Reviews and Ratings for the week of its release. Freelance writer Tatsuya Masutou agreed with many of the audiences, stating that it is a film that make you want to go to "yakiniku" (grilled meat), and film critic LiLiCo praised the film for it would "lead you to such a wonderful life of deliciousness and fun!" Just as writer Youzo Kawai concluded about the film: "And as a foodie and a director, Jimon Terakado's presentation of the manner of "yakiniku" (grilled meat) will surprise you."
