= Unmei no Hito =

Novel by Toyoko Yamasaki

- Author: Toyoko Yamasaki
- Original title: 運命の人
- Language: Japanese
- Publication date: 2009
- Publication place: Japan

Unmei no Hito (Japanese: 運命の人) is a novel by Toyoko Yamasaki. It was serialized in monthly magazine Bungei Shunjū from 2005 to 2009. The series was published as a four-volume set in 2009 and was later adapted into a 2012 television series starring Masahiro Motoki.

== Plot ==
Ryota Yuminari of the Maicho Shimbun broke a scoop about a secret agreement between Japan and the United States regarding the reversion of Okinawa, but it was an act that made an enemy of the state authorities.

== Television adaptation ==
Unmei no Hito
- Also known as: Man of Destiny
- Written by: Hiroshi Hashimoto
- Directed by: Nobuhiro Doi; Ken Yoshida
- Starring: Masahiro Motoki; Takako Matsu; Yōko Maki; Nao Omori; Kin'ya Kitaōji
- Composer: Naoki Satō
- Country of origin: Japan
- Original language: Japanese
- No. of seasons: 1
- No. of episodes: 10

Production
- Executive producer: Katsuaki Setoguchi
- Running time: 54 minutes

Original release
- Network: TBS
- Release: January 15 – March 18, 2012

=== Cast ===
Main

- Masahiro Motoki as Ryota Yuminari (based on Takichi Nishiyama)
- Takako Matsu as Yuriko Yuminari, Ryota's wife
- Yōko Makias Akiko Miki (based on Kikuko Hasumi)
- Nao Omori as Kazuo Yamabe, the ace reporter of Yominichi Shimbun (based on Tsuneo Watanabe)
- Kin'ya Kitaōji as the prime minister Keisaku Sahashi (based on Eisaku Satō)

Yuminari family

- Isao Hashizume as Ryota's father
- Jitsuko Yoshimura as Ryota's mother
- Yuki Imai as Yoichi, Ryota and Yuriko's eldest son (episodes 1–8)
  - Masaki Suda as Yoichi (episode 9)
- Ryutaro Yamasaki as Junji, Ryota and Yuriko's second son (episodes 1–8)
  - Riku Hagiwara as Junji (episode 9)
- Kei Yamamoto as Yuriko's father
- Yukiko Takabayashi as Yuriko's mother
- Hiroki Hasegawa as Rei Koinuma

Maicho Shimbun

- Yutaka Matsushige as Shuichi Tsukasa (based on Ken'ichi Ueda)
- Yukiya Kitamura as Kiyohara
- Yuya Endo as Kaneda
- Hideyuki Kasahara as Nakamura
- Tetta Sugimoto as Araki
- Kōtarō Yoshida as Hisadome
- Katsuhiko Watabiki as Ōdate

Politicians

- Akira Emoto as Masayoshi Kodaira (based on Masayoshi Ōhira)
- Takashi Sasano as Takeo Fukude (based on Takeo Fukuda)
- Mansaku Fuwa as Kakuzo Tabuchi (based on Kakuei Tanaka)
- Shinya Owada as Kiichi Aikawa (based on Kiichi Aichi)
- Hirotarō Honda as Yasuhiro Sonegawa (based on Yasuhiro Nakasone)
- Issei Takubo as Zen'ichi Suzumori (based on Zenkō Suzuki)
- Ichikawa Ennosuke IV as Hiroshi Yokomizo (based on Takahiro Yokomichi)

Ministry of Foreign Affairs

- Ryo Ishibashi as Suguru Anzai (based on Takeshi Yasukawa)
- Takeshi Masu as Magoroku Yoshida (based on Bunroku Yoshino)

Others

- Masatō Ibu as Masaharu Totoki
- Hidekazu Mashima as Yuya Matsunaka
- Ayumu Saito as Yuzo Torii
- Masane Tsukayama as Takeshi Aniya

== Reception ==
Tsuneo Watanabe, the model for Yamabe, expressed his displeasure after watching the TV series, saying, "The episodes about Yamabe are all fabrications, completely different from the truth." Similarly, Takichi Nishiyama, the model for Ryota Yuminari, also commented on the original novel, stating, "There are too many parts that deviate from the facts," and added, "I am even angrier than Mr. Watanabe."
