= Isola (film) =

- Film poster
- Directed by: Toshiyuki Mizutani
- Screenplay by: Toshiyuki Mizutani; Mugita Kinosita
- Produced by: Shunsuke Yamada; Fumio Inoue
- Starring: Yoshino Kimura; Yu Kurosawa; Ken Ishiguro; Satomi Tezuka; Makiko Watanabe
- Cinematography: Shuji Kuriyama
- Edited by: Nobuyuki Takahashi
- Music by: David Matthews; Takeo Miratsu
- Production company: ISOLA Production Group
- Distributed by: Toho
- Release date: 22 January 2000 (Japan)
- Running time: 94 minutes
- Country: Japan
- Language: Japanese

Isola (Japanese: ISOLA 多重人格少女, Hepburn: ISOLA Taju-jinkaku Shojo; lit. "ISOLA - Multiple Personality Girl") is a 2000 Japanese horror film directed by Toshiyuki Mizutani. The film is about a woman with ESP who helps the survivors of the Great Hanshin earthquake, who then encounters a girl with a personality disorder, one which is malevolent and possesses paranormal powers.

== Cast ==
Cast adapted from the Toho Filmography book:

- Yoshino Kimura as Yukari Komo
- Yu Kurosawa as Chihiro Moritani
- Ken Ishiguro as Kazuhiko Manabe
- Satomi Tezuka as Hiroko Nomura
- Makiko Watanabe as Yayoi Takano

== Release ==
Isola was distributed theatrically in Japan by Toho on January 22, 2000. It was released as a double feature with Ring 0: Birthday. The film was released direct-to-video by Adness America Co. with English subtitles on February 15, 2005.

== Reception ==
From contemporary reviews, reviewers in Fangoria described the film as "straightforward fright fare" with "a few good thrills" noting that the character's relationships were "nicely handled" but that the "story falls apart in the second half".

The films opened in third place at the Japanese box office.
