= Kōmyō ga Tsuji =

2006 taiga drama about Chiyo and Yamauchi Kazutoyo

- Genre: Historical, jidaigeki
- Based on: Kōmyō ga Tsuji (功名が辻) by Ryōtarō Shiba
- Written by: Shizuka Ōishi
- Directed by: Mitsunobu Ozaki and others
- Starring: Yukie Nakama; Takaya Kamikawa; Tetsuya Takeda; Gin Maeda; Hiromi Nagasaku; Emi Wakui; Masami Nagasawa; Teruyuki Kagawa; Michitaka Tsutsui; Kyōko Hasegawa; Saburo Ishikura; Katsuhisa Namase; Junko Mihara; Atsushi Tamura; Hisahiro Ogura; Hiroki Narimiya; Hiroshi Tamaki; Akiko Matsumoto; Goro Noguchi; Yumi Takigawa; Mao Daichi; Bandō Mitsugorō; Nakamura Hashinosuke; Masaomi Kondō; Masahiko Tsugawa; Yūko Asano; Akira Emoto; Yoshiko Sakuma; Toshiyuki Nishida; Hiroshi Tachi
- Narrated by: Tamio Miyake
- Theme music composer: Reijirō Koroku
- Composer: Reijirō Koroku
- Country of origin: Japan
- Original language: Japanese
- No. of episodes: 49

Production
- Producer: Akimasa Oka (chief)
- Production location: Japan
- Running time: 45 minutes

Original release
- Network: NHK
- Release: January 8 – December 10, 2006

Kōmyō ga Tsuji (功名が辻; lit 'The Crossroads of Fame') is a 2006 Japanese historical television series, and the 45th NHK taiga drama. It is written by Shizuka Ōishi, based on the 1965 novel of the same name by Ryōtarō Shiba. The series chronicles the lives of Chiyo and Yamauchi Kazutoyo, a couple who lived during the Sengoku period of Japan.

== Cast ==
=== Chiyo and Kazutoyo ===
- Yukie Nakama as Chiyo, wife of Kazutoyo
  - Anzu Nagai as young Chiyo
- Takaya Kamikawa as Yamauchi Kazutoyo, samurai and later Lord of Tosa
  - Shingo Michinaka as young Kazutoyo

=== Their family ===
- Yoshiko Sakuma as Hōshūin
- Hiroshi Tamaki as Yamauchi Yasutoyo
- Masahiko Tsugawa as Fuwa Ichinojō
- Yumi Takigawa as Kinu
- Shin Takuma as Wakamiya Kisuke
- Tae Kimura as Tomo
- Ei Morisako as Yone
- Haruma Miura as Shōnan

=== Goto and Sofue clan ===
- Tetsuya Takeda as Goto Kichibei
- Gin Maeda as Sofue Shinemon
- Mami Kumagai as Fune
- Manabu Hamada as Sofue Shin'ichirō
- Shinnosuke Furumoto as Sofue Tokushinsai

=== Horio clan ===
- Katsuhisa Namase as Horio Yoshiharu
- Junko Mihara as Ito
- Atsuo Ōuchi as Horio Tadauji

=== Nakamura clan ===
- Atsushi Tamura as Nakamura Kazuuji
- Otoha as Toshi
- Momoki Yamada as Yokota Naizen

=== Oda clan ===
- Hiroshi Tachi as Oda Nobunaga
- Mao Daichi as Oichi
- Emi Wakui as Nōhime
- Seiji Iinuma as Oda Nobutaka
- Kunihiko Ōchiba as Oda Nobukatsu
- Yūki Fujita as Sanbōshi
- Bandō Mitsugorō X as Akechi Mitsuhide
- Hiroshi Katsuno as Shibata Katsuie
- Tatsuo Nadaka as Niwa Nagahide
- Shunsuke Kariya as Hayashi Michikatsu
- Tōta Tawaragi as Sakuma Nobumori
- Shinji Furukawa as Takigawa Kazumasu
- Dai Watanabe as Mori Ranmaru

=== Toyotomi clan ===
- Akira Emoto as Toyotomi Hideyoshi
- Yūko Asano as Nene
- Hiromi Nagasaku as Chacha
  - Mao Noguchi as young Chacha
- Hiroki Narimiya as Toyotomi Hidetsugu
  - Reita Shibai as young Hidetsugu
- Kin Sugai as Naka
- Akiko Matsumoto as Asahi
- Goro Noguchi as Soeda Jinbei
- Masahiro Kobayashi as Gensuke
- Junichi Haruta as Toyotomi Hidenaga
- Hideo Ishiguro as Toyotomi Hideyori
- Nakamura Hashinosuke III as Ishida Mitsunari
- Michitaka Tsutsui as Takenaka Hanbei
- Yoshihiro Takayama as Hachisuka Koroku
- Yōsuke Saitō as Kuroda Kanbei
- Hideaki Tamiya as Kuroda Nagamasa
- Norihito Kaneko as Katō Kiyomasa
- Hironari Arashi as Fukushima Masanori

=== Tokugawa clan ===
- Toshiyuki Nishida as Tokugawa Ieyasu
- Nakamura Baijaku II as Tokugawa Hidetada
- Ayami Tsuru as Senhime
- Ken Tanaka as Honda Sakuzaemon
- Eisuke Sasai as Ii Naomasa
- Tarō Kawano as Sakakibara Yasumasa
- Nobuhiko Takada ad Honda Tadakatsu
- Hiroshi Ōkōchi as Ishikawa Kazumasa
- Junpei Morita as Sakai Tadatsugu
- Ryō Amamiya as Honda Masazumi
- Susumu Nihashi as Hattori Hanzō

=== Hosokawa clan ===
- Masaomi Kondō as Hosokawa Yūsai
- Kyōko Hasegawa as Hosokawa Gracia
- Manabu Ino as Hosokawa Tadaoki
- Kyūsaku Shimada as Ogasawara Shōsai
- Mariko Tsutsui as Kiyo

=== Azai clan ===
- Takaaki Enoki as Azai Nagamasa
- Kei Yamamoto as Azai Hisamasa
- Ayato Kosugi as Manpukumaru
- Maiko Kikkawa as Hatsu
  - Rina Matsumoto as young Hatsu
- Erika Niibo as Gō
  - Nichika Hara as young Gō

=== Saitō clan ===
- Kazuma Kudō as Saitō Tatsuoki
- Tasuku Uno as Andō Morinari
- Hideki Oshikiri as Hineno Hironari
- Toshiya Tanaka as Ujiie Bokuzen
- Takashi Kuramoto as Inaba Ittetsu

=== Mōri clan ===
- Masane Tsukayama as Mōri Terumoto
- Moro Moro'oka as Kikkawa Hiroie
- Shōichirō Akaboshi as Ankokuji Ekei
- Hiroyuki Kinoshita as Shimizu Muneharu

=== Ashikaga shogunate ===
- Kōki Mitani as Ashikaga Yoshiaki
- Yoshiyuki Yamaguchi as Ashikaga Yoshiteru

=== Others ===
- Teruyuki Kagawa as Rokuheita
- Masami Nagasawa as Korin
- Sayuri Ishikawa as Setsu
- Tōru Emori as Imagawa Yoshimoto
- Tokio Emoto as Emperor Go-Yōzei
- Tōru Shinagawa as Matsunaga Hisahide
- Hiroyuki Sakamoto as Kobayakawa Hideaki
- Hiroshi Iwasaki as Shimazu Yoshihiro
- Ryō Tamura as Shimazu Toyohisa
- Ken Yasuda as Ukita Hideie
- Kenichi Yajima as Naoe Kanetsugu
- Toshiaki Karasawa as Maeda Toshiie

== Production ==
The 45th taiga drama was announced to be Kōmyō ga Tsuji on July 16, 2004, with Yukie Nakama and Takaya Kamikawa starring in the lead roles of Chiyo and Yamauchi Kazutoyo respectively.

Toshiaki Karasawa made a cameo appearance as Maeda Toshiie, a protagonist of the 2002 taiga drama.

As the series was in the middle of its run with high ratings, chief producer Akimasa Oda remarked that the series' success is likely due to its lead couple's ordinariness and industrious attitude.

== Home media ==
The first 27 episodes of Kōmyō ga Tsuji were released by NHK within one DVD box set on January 25, 2007. The remaining 22 episodes were released in a separate box set on March 21, 2007.

== Soundtrack ==
- NHK Taiga Drama "Kōmyō ga Tsuji" Original Soundtrack (Release date: May 10, 2006)
