= Bakumatsu (film) =

1970 film

- Film poster
- Directed by: Daisuke Itō
- Screenplay by: Daisuke Itō
- Based on: Bakumatsu by Ryōtarō Shiba
- Starring: Kinnosuke Nakamura; Toshirō Mifune; Tatsuya Nakadai; Sayuri Yoshinaga; Noboru Nakaya; Keiju Kobayashi; Isao Yamagata; Katsuo Nakamura; Shinjirō Ehara
- Cinematography: Kazuo Yamada
- Edited by: Yoshihiro Araki
- Music by: Masaru Sato
- Production company: Nakamura Production
- Distributed by: Toho
- Release date: February 14, 1970 (Japan)
- Running time: 120 minutes
- Country: Japan
- Language: Japanese

Bakumatsu (Japanese: 幕末), also known as The Ambitious or The Restoration of Meiji, is a 1970 Japanese jidaigeki film directed by Daisuke Itō. It is based on Ryōtarō Shiba's novel of the same title.

The film depicts chronicles the life of Sakamoto Ryōma and people around him.

== Cast ==
- Kinnosuke Nakamura as Sakamoto Ryōma
- Toshirō Mifune as Gotō Shōjirō
- Tatsuya Nakadai as Nakaoka Shintarō
- Sayuri Yoshinaga as Oryō
- Noboru Nakaya as Takechi Hanpeita
- Shigeru Kōyama as Katsu Kaishū
- Keiju Kobayashi as Saigō Takamori
- Isao Yamagata as Yamada
- Ryosuke Kagawa as Tōkichi
- Katsuo Nakamura as Kondō Chōjirō
- Shinjirō Ehara as Miyoshi Shinzō
- Atsushi Watanabe as Suga
