= Michiko Godai =

Japanese actress

Michiko Godai (五大 路子, Godai Michiko), real name Michiko Ōwada (大和田 美智子, Ōwada Michiko) (born September 22, 1952 in Yokohama, Kanagawa) is a Japanese actress. She has appeared in various films and TV dramas and series as well as stage productions.

== Filmography ==
=== Feature films ===
- Sachiko Yagami in Death Note (2006)

=== Television ===
- Renzoku Terebi Shōsetsu (1977; 1992)
- Ōedo Sōsamō
- Taiga drama (1985; 1987; 1989; 1995; 2000)
- The Samurai I Loved
