= Toshiaki Karasawa =

Japanese actor (born 1963)

- 唐沢 寿明
- Born: Kiyoshi Karasawa; June 3, 1963 (age 63); Tokyo, Japan
- Occupation: Actor
- Years active: 1980–present
- Spouse: Tomoko Yamaguchi (m. 1995)
- Website: https://teamkarasawa.jp/

Toshiaki Karasawa (唐沢 寿明, Karasawa Toshiaki; born June 3, 1963) (real name Kiyoshi Karasawa (唐澤 潔 Karasawa Kiyoshi)) is a Japanese theatre and film actor. He made his theatrical debut in the play Boy's Revue Stay Gold in 1987. He specializes in theatrical action sequences such as swordplay and fighting. He dubbed over the roles of Tom Hanks in the Toy Story series, and The Polar Express.

He has been nominated for two Japanese Academy Awards, and was named Best Newcomer in 1992. He married actress Tomoko Yamaguchi on December 15, 1995.

== Filmography ==
=== Television ===
Year	Title	Role	Notes	Ref.
1988	Jun-chan's Cheering Song	Yuta Hayashi	Asadora	
1989	Kasuga no Tsubone	Inaba Masakatsu	Taiga drama	
1992	In the Name of Love	Kengo Takatsuki		
1992	Homework	Keisuke Morita	Lead role	
1994	Tokyo Cinderella Story	Masashi Takagi		
1994–99	Oishinbo	Shirō Yamaoka	Lead role; 5 television films	
1996	Furuhata Ninzaburō	Kenkichi Sendo	Episode 19	
2002	Toshiie and Matsu	Maeda Toshiie	Lead role; Taiga drama	
2003	Human Crossing	Hiroshi Tsuruhashi (voice)	Episode 2	
2003	The Great White Tower	Goro Zaizen	Lead role	
2006	Komyo ga Tsuji	Maeda Toshiie	Episode 39; Taiga drama	
2006	Doctor in Love	Nobuki Kobayakawa	Lead role	
2007	Akechi Mitsuhide	Akechi Mitsuhide	Lead role; television film	
2007	Galileo	Tatsuo Kanamori	Episode 1	
2009	The Waste Land	Tadashi Iki	Lead role	
2010	Guilty	Kiichi Dōjima		
2013	Made in Japan	Atsushi Yahagi	Lead role; miniseries	
2013	Take Five: Should We Steal For Love?	Masayoshi Homura	Lead role	
2014	Roosevelt Game	Mitsuru Hosokawa	Lead role	
2015	The Last Cop	Kōsuke Kyōgoku	Lead role	
2015	Save Our Town!	Eiji Asai	Lead role	
2016	Daddy Sister	Isaji Hanayama	Asadora	
2019	The Good Wife	Soichiro Hasumi		
2019	Voice: 110 Emergency Control Room	Shōgo Higuchi	Lead role	
2020	24 Japan	Genma Shido	Lead role	
2020	Yell	Saburō Koyam	Asadora	
2023	Fixer	Ken'ichi Shitara	Lead role	
2024	Like a Dragon: Yakuza	Shintaro Kazama		
2025	Private Banker	Kōichi Anno	Lead role	
2026	Shadows of the Ten Ninja	Hakuunsai	Special appearance	

=== Film ===
Year	Title	Role	Notes	Ref.
1991	Happy Wedding	Tamotsu Kawamata		
1991	Hello Harinezumi	Goro Nanase	Lead role	
1997	Welcome Back, Mr. McDonald	Manabu Kudo	Lead role	
2001	Everyone's Home	Hidetoshi Yanagisawa	Lead role	
2004	Casshern	Braiking Boss		
2004	Kwaidan: Eternal Love	Tamiya Iemon	Lead role	
2008	20th Century Boys: Beginning of the End	Kenji	Lead role	
2008	Snakes and Earrings	Police officer		
2009	20th Century Boys: The Last Hope	Kenji	Lead role	
2009	20th Century Boys: Redemption	Kenji	Lead role	
2011	Oba: The Last Samurai	Private Kesamatsu Horiuchi		
2014	Unsung Hero	Wataru Honjo	Lead role	
2015	Persona Non Grata	Chiune Sugihara	Lead role	
2024	90 Years Old – So What?	Masaya Kikkawa		
2026	Mystery Arena	Momotaro Kabayama	Lead role	

=== Video games ===
Year	Title	Role	Notes	Ref.
2003	Drakengard	Inuart		

=== Dubbing roles ===
Year	Title	Role	Notes	Ref.
1995	Toy Story	Woody	1996 dub	
1999	Toy Story 2	Woody	2000 dub	
2004	The Polar Express	Hero Boy, the Conductor, the Hobo, Santa Claus, Scrooge, Hero Boy's father		
2010	Toy Story 3	Woody		
2019	Toy Story 4	Woody		
2026	Toy Story 5	Woody		

== Awards and nominations ==
Year	Award	Category	Work(s)	Result	Ref.
1992	65th Kinema Junpo Awards	Best New Actor	Happy Wedding and Hello Harinezumi	Won	
1992	15th Japan Academy Film Prize	Newcomer of the Year	Happy Wedding and Hello Harinezumi	Won	
1993	17th Elan d'or Awards	Newcomer of the Year	Himself	Won	
1998	21st Japan Academy Film Prize	Best Actor	Welcome Back, Mr. McDonald	Nominated	
2024	37th Nikkan Sports Film Awards	Best Supporting Actor	90 Years Old – So What?	Nominated	
