= Isao Yamagata =

Japanese actor (1915–1996)

- 山形 勲
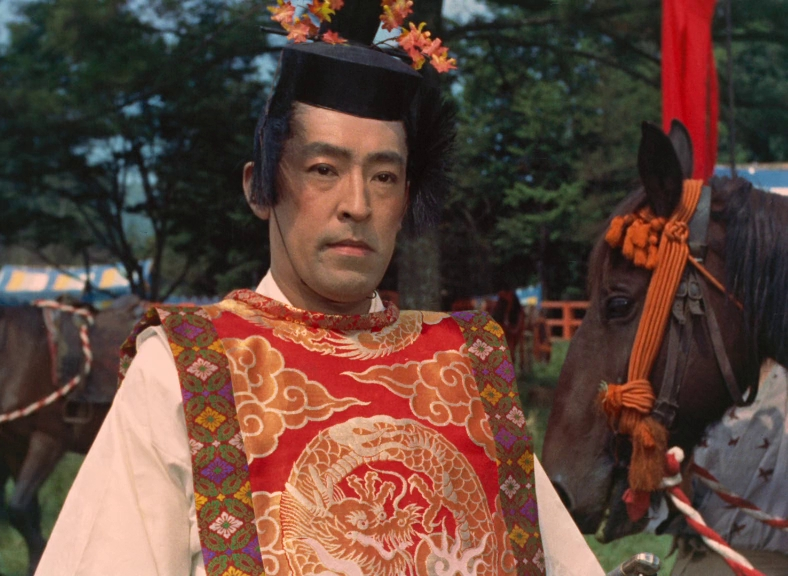
- Yamagata in Gate of Hell (1953)
- Born: 25 July 1915; London, England
- Died: 28 June 1996 (aged 80); Fuchū, Tokyo, Japan
- Occupation: Actor
- Years active: 1951-1984

Isao Yamagata (山形 勲, Yamagata Isao; 25 July 1915 – 28 June 1996) was a Japanese film actor. In 1942, Yamagata and Sō Yamamura formed the Bunkaza Theatre Company. In 1949 he made his film debut with Kirareya Senta. Yamagata became famous for his role in 1953 film Gate of Hell. He became a character actor and often played villainous roles. In 1973, Yamagata landed main role on the TV jidaigeki Kenkaku Shōbai.

He died of tuberculosis in 1996. He appeared in more than 180 films between 1951 and 1984.

== Selected filmography ==
- Bungawan soro (1951)
- Ringo-en no shōjo (1952)
- Mukokuseki-sha (1952)
- Sen-hime (1953) - Samanosuke Itsumi
- Pu-san (1953)
- Kimi ni sasageshi inochi nariseba (1953)
- Seishun Zenigata Heiji (1953) - Plibp
- Gate of Hell (1953) - Wataru Watanabe
- Higeki no shôgun: Yamashita Tomoyuki (1953)
- Hana to ryû - Dai-ichi-bu: Dôkai-wan no rantô (1954) - Shin'nosuke Mori
- Seven Samurai (1954) - Samurai #1
- Wakaki hi no takuboku: Kumo wa tensai de aru (1954) - Kanematsu Kikuchi
- Kakute yume ari (1954) - Ichirô Kasuga
- Jigoku no kengô Hirate Miki (1954) - Isonoshin Yamabe
- The Princess Sen (1954) - Dewanokami Sakasaki
- Floating Clouds (1955) - Sugio Iba
- Minan o koshô: Hitokiri hikosei (1955)
- Jokyû (1955) - Ryûjin Aramaki
- Juku no hana yome (1955)
- Princess Yang Kwei-Fei (1955) - Yang Hsien
- Uruwashiki saigetsu (1955)
- Rokunin no ansatsusha (1955) - Kondō Isami
- Asakusa no oni (1955)
- Meoto zenzai (1955)
- Kôdôkan shitennô (1955)
- Tarao Bannai senritsu no nanakamen (1956)
- Bara no kôdôkan (1956) - Shogoro Yabe
- Warning from Space (1956) - Dr. Matsuda
- Denkô ryûsei karate uchi (1956)
- Neko to Shôzô to futari no onna (1956)
- Tsukigata Hanpeita: Hana no maki; Arashi no maki (1956) - Fujioka
- Shinshokoku monogatari: Nanatsu no chikai kurosuisen no maki (1956)
- Yôda no maden (1956) - Danjô Sarashina
- Outlaw: List of Dupes (1956)
- The Swamp (1956) - Buri-daijin
- Shinshokoku monogatari: Nanatsu no chikai doreisen no maki (1957)
- Shinshokoku monogatari: Nanatsu no chikai gaisen uta no maki (1957)
- The Rice People (1957) - Matsunosuke Ota
- Ôsaka monogatari (1957)
- Ujô (1957) - Shinpei Nakayama
- Tajobushin (1957)
- Daibosatsu tôge (1957) - Lord kamio
- Yûreisen: Zempen (1957) - Gemba Akahana
- Yûreisen: Kôhen (1957) - Yamizô
- Onna goroshi abura jigoku (1957)
- Kichigai buraku (1957)
- Jigokû misaki no fukushû (1957)
- Fuji ni tatsu kage (1957)
- Edo no meibutsuotoko: Isshin Tasuke (1958) - Matsudaira-Izunokami
- Daibosatsu tôge - Dai ni bu (1958)
- Seven from Edo (1958) - Tatewaki
- Uguisu-jô no hanayome (1958)
- Isshin Tasuke - Tenka no ichidaiji (1958) - Matsudaira-Izunokami
- Ten to sen (1958) - Tatsuo Yasuda
- Nora neko (1958)
- Onmitsu Shichishoki (1958)
- Ninkyo Tokaido (1958) - Kadoi
- Do no hâjiki wa jigokû dazê (1958)
- Binan-jo (1959)
- Shingo juban-shobu (1959)
- Kitsune to tanuki (1959)
- Daibosatsu tôge - Kanketsu-hen (1959)
- Shingo jûban shôbu: dai-ni-bu (1959)
- Tenka no igagoe: akatsuki no kessen (1959)
- Chiyari musô (1959)
- Isshin Tasuke: Otoko no naka no otoko ippiki (1959)
- Edo no akutaro (1959) - Tenzen Akiyama
- Senryô-jishi (1959) - Kainokami Torii
- Jigokû no sokô made tsuki auzê (1959)
- Bored Hatamoto: Acrobats of Death (1959)
- Rônin ichiba - Asayake tengu (1960)
- Shiroi gake (1960)
- Nanatsu no kao no otoko daze (1960)
- Tenpô rokkasen - Jigoku no hanamichi (1960)
- Sake to onna to yari (1960) - Mitsunari Ishida
- Tokai no kaoyaku (1960) - Denbe
- Wakasama Samurai Torimonochoo (1960) - Suzuki Uneme
- Shoretsu shinsengumi - bakumatsu no doran (1960) - Serizawa
- Sabaku o wataru taiyo (1960)
- Nippatsume wa jigoku-iki daze (1960)
- Mito Komon 3: All Star Version (1960)
- Akō Rōshi (1961) - Kataoka Gengoemon
- Zoku shachô dochuki: onna oyabun taiketsu no maki (1961) - President Oyamada
- Uogashi no onna Ishimatsu (1961)
- Tekka daimyo (1961)
- Saigo no kaoyaku (1961)
- Kashi no onna Ishimatsu (1961)
- Hakubajô no hanayome (1961)
- Edokko-hada (1961)
- Beranme Chunori-san (1961)
- Oedo Hyobanji Binan no Kaoyaku (1962) - Soshun
- Mabuta no haha (1962) - Yosuke
- Kisaragi musô ken (1962) - Izuminokami Mizuno
- Ano sura no hate ni hoshi hama tataku (1962)
- Hachi gatsu jûgo-nichi no dôran (1962)
- Yagyû bugeichô: Dokugan itto ryu (1962)
- Sakura hangan (1962)
- Knightly Advice (1962)
- Bored Hatamoto: The Mysterious Cape (1963)
- Yagyû bugeichô: Katame no Jûbei (1963)
- Daidokoro taiheiki (1963)
- Yojinbô ichiba (1963)
- Shin meoto zenzai (1963) - Kyoichi
- Kureji sakusen: Kudabare! Musekinin (1963)
- Yogiri no Joshu-Ji (1963)
- Yagyu Chronicles 7: The Cloud of Disorder (1963)
- Kyôkatsu (1963)
- Hibari Chiemi no Yaji Kita Dochu (1963)
- Miyamoto Musashi: Ichijôji no kettô (1964)
- Jakoman to Tetsu (1964)
- Nijuissai no chichi (1964)
- Surai no gyanburaa (1964)
- Otoko no monsho: hana to nagadosu (1964)
- Kuroi kaikyo (1964) - Senba
- Akai shuriken (1965) - Kanzo
- Una sera di Tokyo (1965) - Shinzô Nakajima
- Radishes and Carrots (1965) - Gohei Suzuka
- Shinobi no mono: Iga-yashiki (1965) - Matsudaira
- A Story Written with Water (1965) - Denzo / Shizuo's father
- Buraikan jingi (1965) - Eitaro Oshika
- Shachô gyôjôki (1966)
- Kigeki ekimae manga (1966)
- Zatoichi's Pilgrimage (1966) - Boss Tohachi
- Kigeki ekimae mangan (1967)
- Kigeki ekimae gakuen (1967)
- Samurai Rebellion (1967) - Shobei Tsuchiya
- Rikugun Nakano gakko: Mitsumei (1967)
- Kigeki ekimae hyakku-nen (1967)
- Aru koroshiya no kagi (1967)
- Hârubiyorî (1967)
- Zansetsu (1968) - Kenichiro Shinjo
- Onna mekura hana to kiba (1968)
- Bakumatsu (1970) - Hiroe Yamada
- Kaoyaku (1971) - Ogata, Seizo
- Lone Wolf and Cub: Sword of Vengeance (1972)
- Lone Wolf and Cub: Baby Cart to Hades (1972) - Sawatari Genba
- Yuki Fujin ezu (1975)
- Fumô chitai (1976)
- Tokugawa ichizoku no houkai (1980) - Itakura Katsukiyo
- The Trout (1982) - Daigo Hamada

== TV series ==
- Hana no Shōgai (1963) - Arimura Jizaemon
- Shiroi Kyotō (1967) - Professor Azuma
- The Water Margin (1973) - Chao Gai
- Kenkaku Shōbai (1973) as Kohei Akiyama
- Karei-naru Ichizoku (1974–75)
- Genroku Taiheiki (1975)
- Dokuganryū Masamune (1987) - Mukaidate Takumi

== Honours ==
- Order of the Sacred Treasure, 4th class, Gold Rays with Rosette (1988)
