= Kin'ya Kitaōji =

Japanese actor (born 1943)

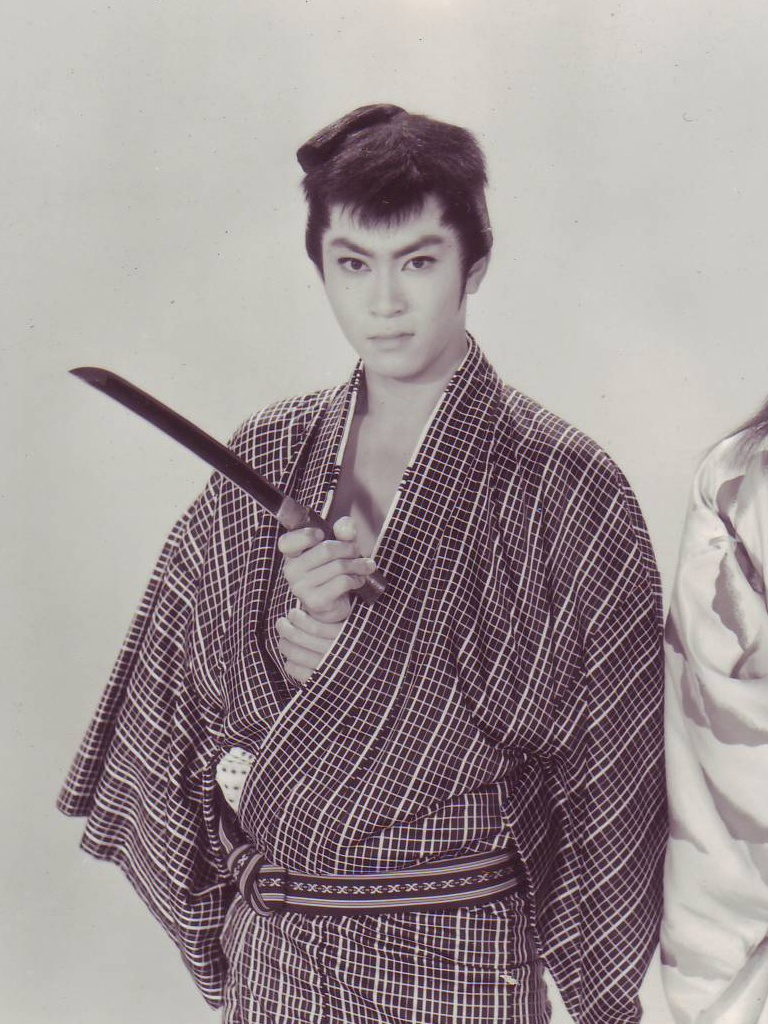
- Kitaōji in a studio still for Wakagimi to Jinanbō (1961)
- Born: February 23, 1943 (age 83); Kyoto, Japan
- Occupation: Actor
- Years active: 1956–present
- Parent: Utaemon Ichikawa (father)

Kin'ya Kitaōji (北大路 欣也, Kitaōji Kin'ya; born February 23, 1943) is a Japanese actor.

== Biography ==
=== Early life ===
He was born in Kyoto, son of jidaigeki film star Ichikawa Utaemon, and graduated from Waseda University School of Letters, Arts and Sciences II in Tokyo.

=== Acting career ===
Kin'ya made his debut with his father in the 1956 Toei film Oyakodaka in the role of Katsu Kaishū. He is a contemporary of, and was taken to be a rival of, Hiroki Matsukata, who was also the son of a famous actor (Jūshirō Konoe). In 1964, Kin'ya made his first appearance on stage in Cyrano de Bergerac.

The 1960s and 1970s saw him in many contemporary roles. He appeared in Battles Without Honor and Humanity: Deadly Fight in Hiroshima and Battles Without Honor and Humanity: Final Episode as well as Karei naru Ichizoku. The title role in the 1975 film Takehisa Yumeji was his.

On television, Kitaōji portrayed Miyamoto Musashi in the Nippon Television show of the same name. A major historical role was Sakamoto Ryōma in the year-long prime-time NHK taiga drama Ryōma ga Yuku (1968). He landed the title role in the long-running cop show Zenigata Heiji, set in the Edo period. In the 1985 twelve-hour New Year special Fūun Yagyū Bugeichō, he played Yagyū Jūbei, and in the following year's special, he portrayed both Tokugawa Yoshimune and Yagyū Shinrokurō. The role of another shogun fell to him in the following new year as TV Tokyo tapped him to play Tokugawa Iemitsu. Kin'ya returned to NHK for the 1987 Taiga drama Dokuganryū Masamune as Date Terumune, father of title character Date Masamune.

Another role he took had been created by his father. Saotome Mondonosuke was the title character in the series Gozonji! Hatamoto Taikutsu Otoko (The Bored Hatamoto). It ran from 1988 to 1994 on TV Asahi. His father, Ichikawa Utaemon, had appeared in numerous films and a 1973-74 TV series as Mondonosuke.

Kin'ya reprised the part of Miyamoto Musashi in the 1990 New Year's special. Toshirō Mifune had portrayed Musashi in the earlier film, also based on the Eiji Yoshikawa story, that had won an Academy Award. He returned to the New Year's special in 1996, again as the famous swordsman, in Tokugawa Kengōden Sore kara no Musashi.

His first portrayal of Ōishi Kuranosuke was in the 1996 Chūshingura. He took up the role again in 2004 for the NHK Saigo no Chūshingura and in 2007, in the New Year special Chūshingura Yōzei-in no Inbō. Other historical roles from the Sengoku period include Azai Nagamasa, Saitō Dōsan, and Yamamoto Kansuke. In addition to historical parts, he appeared in fictional series. His portrayal of Ogami Ittō in Kozure Okami (Lone Wolf and Cub) (2002-2004), which was a series for Asahi TV in Japan, is representative of these appearances.

In 2008, Kitaōji revisited the role of Katsu Kaishū in the taiga drama Atsuhime. He had portrayed Katsu in his 1956 debut.

He won the award for best actor at the 10th Hochi Film Award for Fire Festival and Haru no Kane. Kitaōji played one of the lead roles in Hideo Nakata's psychological thriller film The Incite Mill.

In recent times, Kitaōji voices the Hokkaido-inu character of "Father" in SoftBank Mobile's White Family advertising campaign.

== Filmography ==
=== Film ===
Year	Title	Role	Notes	Ref.
1956	Virtue in Spades	Young Katsu Kaishū	Debut role	
1956	Avenging Father	Minamoto no Yoriie		
1957	The Mansion of Intrigue			
1957	Shadow Over Fuji			
1957	Golden Spell			
1958	Kingdom of Youth	Yamanaka Shikanosuke	Lead role	
1959	The Idle Vassal Pt.13			
1961	The Orphan Brother	Zushiōmaru (voice)		
1962	Tale of Genji Kuro	Minamoto no Yoshitsune	Lead role	
1964	Wolves, Pigs and Men	Sabu		
1965	Tokugawa Ieyasu	Matsudaira Motonobu	Lead role	
1969	Shinsengumi	Okita Sōji		
1971	Men and War Part II	Shunsuke Godai		
1973	Men and War Part III	Shunsuke Godai		
1973	Battles Without Honor and Humanity: Deadly Fight in Hiroshima	Shoji Yamanaka	Lead role	
1974	Battles Without Honor and Humanity: Final Episode	Tamotsu Matsumura		
1974	Karei-naru Ichizoku	Yoshihiko Ichinose		
1975	Cross the Rubicon!	Takeshi Kiyomoto	Lead role	
1975	The Bullet Train	Detective	Special appearance	
1976	Fumō Chitai	Kaifu		
1977	Mount Hakkoda	Captain Kanda	Lead role	
1978	Dynamaite Don Don	Ginji		
1982	Future War 198X	Wataru Mikumo (voice)	Lead role	
1984	Kūkai	Kūkai	Lead role	
1985	Fire Festival	Tatsuo	Lead role	
1985	Haru no Kane	Rokuheita Narumi	Lead role	
1993	Rainbow Bridge	Chōzaemon		
2010	The Incite Mill	Yoshiya Ando		
2010	Sakurada Gate Incident	Tokugawa Nariaki		
2012	Asura	Buddhist Monk (voice)		
2016	One Piece Film: Gold	Raise Max (voice)		
2019	Whistleblower	Ikuo Tokuyama		
2020	The Confidence Man JP: Episode of the Princess	Raymond		
2023	The Legend and Butterfly	Saitō Dōsan		

=== Television ===
Year	Title	Role	Notes	Ref.
1968	Ryōma ga Yuku	Sakamoto Ryōma	Lead role; Taiga drama	
1970	Momi no Ki wa Nokotta	Sakai Tadakiyo	Taiga drama	
1972	Shin Heike Monogatari	Prince Mochihito	Taiga drama	
1987	Dokuganryū Masamune	Date Terumune	Taiga drama	
1991–1998	Zenigata Heiji	Zenigata Heiji	Lead role; 7 seasons	
2001	Hojo Tokimune	Xie Guoming	Taiga drama	
2002-2004	Lone Wolf and Cub	Ogami Itto	Lead role; 3 seasons	
2007	The Family	Daisuke Manpyo		
2007	Liar Game	Hasegawa		
2008	Atsuhime	Katsu Kaishū	Taiga drama	
2008	Genjūrō Hissatsuken	Koyama Genjuro	Lead role	
2009	Genjūrō's Deadly Sword: The Return of Shinigami	Koyama Genjuro	Lead role; TV movie	
2010–2018	Zettai Reido	Hideo Nagashima	3 seasons	
2011	Gō	Tokugawa Ieyasu	Taiga drama	
2012	Man of Destiny	Prime Minister Sahashi		
2013–2020	Hanzawa Naoki	Ken Nakanowatari	Special appearance; 2 seasons	
2014	Doctor-X	Yoshihito Tendō	Season 3	
2015	Burning Flower	Mōri Takachika	Taiga drama	
2015	Massan	Ryūnosuke Uesugi	Asadora	
2015–2023	Seven Detectives	Shuntaro Domoto	9 seasons	
2016	Fragile	Kaoru Nakaguma		
2019–2022	Kioku Sōsa	Ichiro Onizuka	Lead role; 3 seasons	
2021	Reach Beyond the Blue Sky	Tokugawa Ieyasu	Taiga drama	
2024	Believe: A Bridge to You	Goro Bando	Special appearance	
2025	News Anchor	Tsuyoshi Hanyu	Special appearance	

=== Dubbing ===
Year	Title	Role	Dub for	Ref.
2009	Hachi: A Dog's Tale	Professor Parker Wilson	Richard Gere	

=== Video games ===
Year	Title	Role	Notes	Ref.
2010	Yakuza 4	Seishiro Munakata		

== Honours ==
- Medal with Purple Ribbon (2007)
- Order of the Rising Sun, 4th Class, Gold Rays with Rosette (2015)
- Person of Cultural Merit (2023)
