= Mari Nishio =

Japanese actress

Mari Nishio (西尾 まり; born April 2, 1974) is a Japanese actress and former child actress.

== Filmography ==
=== Film ===
- Tora-san Makes Excuses (1992)
- Dolls (2002) – Sawako's friend
- The Matsugane Potshot Affair (2006) – Yoko Togashi
- Wandering Home (2010) – Nurse Ishiyama
- Again (2015) – Yamashita's wife

=== Television ===
- Taiyō ni Hoero! (1981) – Suzuko Kitahara
- Uchi no Ko ni Kagitte... (1984) – Izumi Suwa
- Papa wa Newscaster (1987) – Nishio Megumi
- Keizoku (1999) – Maiko Ōsawa
- AIBOU (2003) – Emi Takizawa
- Kagerō no Tsuji Inemuri Iwane Edo Zōshi (2007) – Setsu
- Smile (2009) – Rina's mother
- Meitantei no Okite (2009) – Masako Aoki
- Don Quixote (2011) – Reiko Okazaki
- Last Money: Ai no Nedan (2011) – Yoriko Yamamoto
- Ashita, Mama ga Inai (2014) – Otsubone's mother
- Masshiro (2015) – Toshie Hosaka
- Toto Neechan (2016) – Setsu Kudō
- Kahogo no Kahoko (2017) – Takashi Namiki
