= Ryō Tamura (actor) =

Japanese actor from Kyoto (born 1972)

Ryō Tamura (田村亮, Tamura Ryō; born May 24, 1946) is a Japanese actor from Kyoto. His father was silent-film star Tsumasaburo Bando. With his elder brothers, the late Takahiro and Masakazu, he is one of the Three Tamura Brothers.

Ryō graduated from Seijo University and made his cinema debut in the 1966 Hiroshi Inagaki film Abare Goemon starring Toshirō Mifune. He also appeared in the 1989 Hiroshi Teshigahara film Rikyū with Rentarō Mikuni in the title role.

Since his debut he has taken roles in both jidaigeki and modern films and television. He portrayed Ōoka Tadasuke in the 1984 television series Kawaite sōrō and the final six years of the long-running prime-time television series Abarenbō Shōgun, replacing Tadashi Yokouchi. A repeating modern role has been Detective Sōsuke Kariya in two-hour dramas costarring Miki Fujitani.

Tamura played Tōdō Takatora in the 2000 NHK taiga drama Aoi Tokugawa Sandai. The network also tapped him for the 2004 miniseries Saigo no Chūshingura in which he portrayed Yanagisawa Yoshiyasu.

== Selected filmography ==
=== Films ===
- Mujo (1970)
- Ryoma Ansatsu (1974), Ōkubo Toshimichi
- The Fall of Ako Castle (1978)
- Rikyu (1989), Toyotomi Hidenaga
- The Samurai I Loved (2005)

=== Television dramas ===
- Daichūshingura (1971)
- Haru no Sakamichi (1971), Yagyu Samon
- Kunitori Monogatari (1973)
- Edo o Kiru (3rd season) (1977)
- The Yagyu Conspiracy (1978)
- Kawaite sōrō (1984)
- Shogun Iemitsu Shinobi Tabi (1990–93)
- Abarenbō Shōgun (1997–2004)
- Aoi Tokugawa Sandai (2000), Tōdō Takatora
- Naruto Hichō (2018)
