= Shin Heike Monogatari (TV series) =

- Genre: Taiga drama
- Written by: Yumie Hiraiwa
- Starring: Tatsuya Nakadai; Tamao Nakamura; Ken Ogata; Tsutomu Yamazaki; Masakazu Tamura; Mikio Narita; Makoto Fujita; Taro Shigaki; Akiko Koyama; Michiyo Aratama; Kōji Takahashi; Shinsuke Ashida; Komaki Kurihara; Masako Izumi; Eitaro Ozawa; Ayako Wakao; Masayuki Mori; Osamu Takizawa
- Theme music composer: Isao Tomita
- Opening theme: NHK Symphony Orchestra
- Country of origin: Japan
- Original language: Japanese
- No. of episodes: 52

Production
- Running time: 45 minutes

Original release
- Network: NHK
- Release: January 2 – December 24, 1972

Related
- Shin Heike Monogatari (film)

Shin Heike Monogatari (新・平家物語) is a 1972 Japanese television series. It is the tenth NHK taiga drama.

Average viewership rating: 24.1%. Highest viewership peak: 27.2%. Episodes 46 and 52 still exist in black and white.

== Story ==
Shin Heike Monogatari deals with the Genpei War in the late Heian period. Based on Eiji Yoshikawa's novel by the same title.

The story chronicles the life of Taira no Kiyomori.

== Staff ==
- Original story : Eiji Yoshikawa
- Music : Isao Tomita

== Cast ==
=== Taira Clan ===
- Tatsuya Nakadai as Taira no Kiyomori
- Tamao Nakamura as Taira no Tokiko
- Tsutomu Yamazaki as Taira no Tokitada
- Yoshiko Sakuma as Taira no Tokuko
- Daijirō Harada as Taira no Shigemori
- Homare Suguro as Taira no Munemori
- Mizutani Yaeko I as Ikenozenni
- Ikkō Furuya as Taira no Tsunemori
  - Hiromi Go as young Tsunemori
- Akira Nakao as Taira no Tadanori

=== Minamoto Clan ===
- Takamaru Sasaki as Minamoto no Tameyoshi
- Isao Kimura as Minamoto no Yoshitomo
- Koji Takahashi as Minamoto no Yoritomo
- Taro Shigaki as Minamoto no Yoshitsune
- Makoto Satō as Benkei
- Goro Ibuki as Minamoto no Tametomo
- Ayako Wakao as Tokiwa Gozen
- Daisuke Katō as Hōjō Tokimasa
- Komaki Kurihara as Hōjō Masako
- Toshiyuki Nishida as Hojo Yoshitoki

=== Emperors ===
- Osamu Takizawa as Emperor Shirakawa and Emperor Go-Shirakawa
- Masakazu Tamura as Emperor Sutoku
- Kataoka Takao as Emperor Takakura

=== Others ===
- Masayuki Mori as Fujiwara no Tadazane
- Masako Izumi as Yomogiko
- Akiko Koyama as Fujiwara no Nariko
- Seiichiro Kameishi as Fujiwara no Nobuyori
- Eiji Okada as Kumagai Naozane
- Yoichi Hayashi as Kiso Yoshinaka
- Shinsuke Ashida as Minamoto no Yorimasa
- Takeshi Kusaka
- Makoto Fujita
- Junkichi Orimoto as Minamoto no Yukiie
- Tōru Emori as Higuchi Kanemitsu
- Seiji Miyaguchi as Fujiwara no Shunzei
- Yoshi Kato as Fujiwara no Hidehira
- Yukio Minagawa as Saigyō
- Rinichi Yamamoto as Jitsusōbō
- Mikio Narita as Fujiwara no Yorinaga
- Kin'ya Kitaōji as Prince Mochihito
- Ken Ogata as Abei no Asadori
- Eitaro Ozawa as Shinzei
