= Kōji Takahashi =

Japanese actor

Kōji Takahashi (高橋幸治) (born 10 June 1935 in Tōkamachi, Niigata), is a Japanese actor, who attended Niigata Prefectural Tōkamachi High School and later Toyo University.

== Career ==
While he was at Toyo University, Takahashi became a chauffeur of Seiji Miyaguchi, an actor of the theatrical company Bungakuza (文学座). In 1959, he joined Bungakuza, and made his debut with the play Japan's Deserted Island (日本の孤島). In 1963, he had a role in the film Mother (母) directed by Kaneto Shindō. Subsequent major roles include Oda Nobunaga in the third NHK Taiga Drama Taikōki in 1965, and Lieutenant Hayami in the NHK morning drama series Ohanahan in 1966.

== Filmography ==
=== Films ===
- Mother (1963) – Haruo
- Samurai Spy (1965) – Sasuke Sarutobi
- Tempyō no Iraka (1980)
- Imperial Navy (1981) – Ugaki
- Tokyo: The Last Megalopolis (1988) – Kōda Rohan
- Godzilla vs. Biollante (1989) – Dr. Genichiro Shiragami

=== Television ===
- Taikōki (1965, NHK) – Oda Nobunaga
- Ten to Chi to (1969、NHK) – Takeda Shingen
- Shin Heike Monogatari (1972, NHK) – Minamoto no Yoritomo
- Ōgon no Hibi (1978, NHK) – Oda Nobunaga
- Sekigahara (1981, TBS) – Ōtani Yoshitsugu
- Taiyō ni Hoero! (1983, NTV)
