= Akō Rōshi (disambiguation) =

Akō Rōshi refers to the forty-seven rōnin.

Akō Rōshi may also refer to:

- Akō Rōshi: Ten no Maki, Chi no Maki, a 1956 Japanese film
- Akō Rōshi (1961 film), a Japanese film
- Akō Rōshi (1964 TV series), a Japanese television series.
- Akō Rōshi (1979 TV series), a Japanese television period drama
