= Naruto Hichō =

Naruto Hichō (鳴門秘帖, Naruto Hichō) is a series of jidaigeki novels written by Eiji Yoshikawa. The stories were originally serialized as a serial in the Japanese newspaper Osaka Mainichishimbun, between 1926 and 1927. It has been re-released in book format in 1927 and 1933.

Yoshikawa wrote the novel inspired by Shiba Kōkan's essay "Shunparōhikki".

== Adaptations ==
=== Films ===
- Naruto Hichō (1926–27) a Makinopro production.
- Kōkayashiki (1949) a Daiei production, starring Kazuo Hasegawa and directed by Teinosuke Kinugasa.
- Naruto Hichō (1954) a Toei production, starring Utaemon Ichikawa and directed by Kunio Watanabe.
- Naruto Hichō Kōhen (1954) a Toei production, starring Utaemon Ichikawa and directed by Kunio Watanabe.
- A Fantastic Tale of Naruto (1957) a Daiei production, starring Kazuo Hasegawa and directed by Teinosuke Kinugasa.
- Naruto Hichō (1961) a Toei production, starring Kōji Tsuruta and directed by Kōkichi Uchida.
- Naruto Hichō Kanketsuhen (1961) a Toei production, starring Kōji Tsuruta and directed by Kōkichi Uchida.

=== Television series ===
- Naruto Hichō (1959) a KR production.
- Naruto Hichō (1966) a Mainichi Broadcasting System production.
- Naruto Hichō (1977–78) a NHK production, starring Masakazu Tamura.
- Naruto Hichō (2018) a NHK production, starring Koji Yamamoto.
