= Masakazu Tamura =

Japanese film and theatre actor (1943–2021)

- 田村 正和
- Born: 1 August 1943; Kyoto, Japan
- Died: 3 April 2021 (aged 77)
- Education: Seijo University
- Occupation: Actor
- Years active: 1960–2018
- Agent: Shinwa Jimusho
- Known for: Nemuri Kyōshirō; Naruto Hichō; Furuhata Ninzaburō; Uchi no Ko ni Kagitte...; Papa wa Newscaster; Female Convict Scorpion: Grudge Song
- Height: 1.74 m (5 ft 9 in)
- Children: 1
- Father: Tsumasaburō Bandō
- Relatives: Takahiro Tamura (older brother); Ryō Tamura (younger brother)
- Awards: Monte-Carlo Television Festival Outstanding Actor

Masakazu Tamura (田村 正和, Tamura Masakazu; 1 August 1943 - 3 April 2021) was a Japanese film and theatre actor.

== Profile ==
Masakazu Tamura was born 1 August 1943 in Kyoto, Japan to Japanese actor Tsumasaburō Bandō. Tsumasaburō Bandō died when Tamura was only nine years old. His brothers Takahiro and Ryō are also actors. He had been thinking of becoming an actor in the future since he was a child. He was thus trained in fighting with swords and more traditional forms of Japanese theatre like Kabuki and Nihon Buyō. He graduated from Seijo University.

In 1960, he made a cameo appearance in the film Hatamoto Gurentai, in which his older brother Takahiro starred. The following year, he signed a contract with the Shōchiku Ōfuna company while he was still in university. In the same year, he made his official film debut in the film Eternal Woman directed by Keisuke Kinoshita. His first leading film role was Kono koenaki sakebi directed by Hirokazu Ichimura in 1965. He left Shōchiku in 1966 and established his own agency. In 1967, He released the first and only song in his career "Sora Ippai no Namida". His breakthrough came in 1970 after landing a role in the television series Fuyu no Tabi on TBS. From 1970s, Tamura focused predominately on television with occasional film appearances including Yasuharu Hasebe's film Female Prisoner Scorpion: 701's Grudge Song and Yasuo Furuhata's film Nihon no Fixer . From the mid-1960s to the 1970s, Tamura was called the Japanese Alain Delon.

He appeared in many period dramas (jidaigeki) such as his lead role in Naruto Hichō on NHK and most of his roles were skilled swordsmen. From 1963 to 1966 Tamura had non-starring appearances in the annual Taiga drama for 4 years in a row. He also appeared in the Taiga drama Haru no Sakamichi (1971) and Shin Heike Monogatari (1972). He played the title role of "Nemuri Kyoshirō" and won great popularity in 1972; it is Tamura's most famous role in jidaigeki. Five sequel special's of the drama were made over a span of 45 years, he also played the same role on the stage in 1973 and 1981.

From the late 1980s he began to appear in comedy dramas such as Papa wa Newscaster or home dramas and gained new popularity.

In 1993, Tamura played the role of "Ogami Ittō" in Akira Inoue's film Lone Wolf and Cub: Final Conflict by Kazuo Koike's strong request. His photo book of the film was also released.

He is most famous for his role as the polite and highly idiosyncratic police detective "Furuhata Ninzaburō" in a self-titled drama by Japanese playwright Kōki Mitani. This drama was one of the most popular in its time and one of the most popular dramas in the history of Japanese television. The drama started in 1994 and Tamura continued playing Detective Furuhata until 2006. (In 1997, Tamura and Mitani worked together again in Sōrito Yobanaide on Fuji TV.)

In 2007, Tamura appeared in the film for the first in 14 years in Last Love.

Tamura won "Outstanding Actor" at the Monte-Carlo Television Festival for his work in the TV special Ah, You're Really Gone Now in 2009. Tamura appeared in several television dramas related to Chushingura and finally he played the role of "Ōishi Kuranosuke" for the first time in the special drama Chushingura Sono Otoko Ōishi Kuranosuke in 2010.

In 2018, he played the role of "Nemuri Kyoshirō" for the first time in about 20 years in Nemuri Kyoshirō The Final on Fuji TV. But he hinted at his retirement from acting soon after appearing in that TV movie.

He died of heart failure on 3 April 2021 at the age of 77.

== Selected filmography ==
=== Films ===
Year	Title	Role	Director	Notes
1960	Hatamoto Gurentai	Mori Takehichi	Seiichi Fukuda	
1961	Immortal Love	Eiichi	Keisuke Kinoshita	
1962	Love Under the Crucifix	Brother of Ogin	Kinuyo Tanaka	
1964	The Scent of Incense	Ezaki's son	Keisuke Kinoshita	
1964	Kojiki Taishō	Hanawaka	Tokuzō Tanaka	
1965	Kono koenaki Sakebi	Sasaki Shinichi	Ichimura Taichi	Main role
1966	Ameno Nakan Futari	Kasuga Ryuji	Sakurai Hideo	Main role
1966	Sora Ippai no Namida	Sugi Shunsuke	Junzo Mizukawa	Main role
1966	Our Wonderful Years	Yoshida Shun	Heinosuke Gosho	
1967	A Fool's Love	Hamada Nobuo	Yasuzo Masumura	
1967	Onna no Issho	Yayoi Senichi	Heinosuke Gosho	
1967	Double Suicide: Japanese Summer	Boy	Nagisa Oshima	
1968	A Woman and the Beancurd Soup	Sakimura	Heinosuke Gosho	
1968	Higashi Shinakai	Chiba Rokurō	Tadahiki Isomi	Main role
1968	The Yoshiwara Story	Naojirō	Kazuo Mori	
1968	Curse of the Blood	Shinichirō	Kazuo Hase	Main role
1969	Chōkōsō no Akebono	Shimamura	Hideo Sekigawa	
1969	Kuro bara no yakata	Wataru	Kinji Fukasaku	
1969	Samurai Banners	Takeda Nobushige	Hiroshi Inagaki	
1969	Gendai Yakuza: Yotamono Jingi	Katsumata Toru	Yasuo Furuhata	
1969	The Wild Sea	Shimamura Ken	Tokujirō Yamazaki	
1969	Nemuri Kyōshirō manji giri	Umezu Ichirōta	Kazuo Ikehiro	
1970	Decapitation Island	Santarō Isahaya	Kunihara Toshiaki	Main role
1970	Onna Gokuakuchō	Isogai Iori	Kazuo Ikehiro	Main role
1970	Yakuza Zessyō	Yuji	Yasuzo Masumura	
1971	Tabiji	Kitamura Takashi	Kōichi Saitō	
1973	Female Convict Scorpion: Grudge Song	Teruo Kudo	Yasuharu Hasebe	
1976	Kitano Yadokara	Higashihata Osamu	Hirokazu Ichimura	
1979	Nihon no Fixer	Imaizumi Takeo	Yasuo Furuhata	Main role
1993	Lone Wolf and Cub: Final Conflict	Ogami Ittō	Akira Inoue	Main role
2007	Last Love	Agawa Akira	Meiji Fujita	Main role

=== Television dramas ===
Year	Title	Role	Notes
1963	Hana no Shōgai (花の生涯)	Tada Tatewaki	Taiga drama
1964	Akō Rōshi (赤穂浪士)		Taiga drama
1965	Taikōki (太閤記)	Toyotomi Hidetsugu	Taiga drama
1966	Minamoto no Yoshitsune (源義経)	Fujiwara no Tadahira	Taiga drama
1971	Daichūshingura (大忠臣蔵)	Yatō Emoshichi	
1971	Haru no Sakamichi (春の坂道)	Fuwa Bansaku	Taiga drama
1972	Shin Heike Monogatari(新、平家物語)	Emperor Sutoku	Taiga drama
1972-73	Nemuri Kyōshirō (眠狂四郎)	Nemuri Kyōshirō	Main role
1973	Shinsho Taikōki (新書太閤記)	Takenaka Hanbei	
1974	Unmeitouge (運命峠)	Akizuki Rokurota	Main role
1977	Naruto Hichō (鳴門秘帖)	Norizuki Gennojō	Main role
1977	Suna no Utsuwa (砂の器)	Eiryō Waga	
1979	Akō Rōshi (赤穂浪士)	Hotta Hayato	Main role
1983	Natsu ni Koisuru Onnatachi	Kurahashi Mitsuo	Main role
1984	Uchi no Ko ni Kagitte...	Ishibashi Toru	Main role
1984	Kawaite sōrō (乾いて候)	Kainage Mondo	Main role
1987	Papa wa Newscaster	Kagami Ryutarō	Main role
1988	New York koi Monogatari	Tajima Masayuki	Main role
1989	Nemuri Kyôshirô	Nemuri Kyōshirō	Main role
1991	Papa to Natchan	Shimura Gorō	Main role
1993	Nemuri Kyoshiro: Conspiracy at Edo Castle	Nemuri Kyōshirō	Main role
1994	Furuhata Ninzaburo	Furuhata Ninzaburo	Main role
1996	Nemuri Kyoshiro: The Man with No Tomorrow	Nemuri Kyōshirō	Main role
1996	Kyōsōkyoku (協奏曲)	Ebisawa Kōsuke	Main role
1997	Sōrito Yobanaide	Prime Minister	Main role
1998	Nemuri Kyoshiro: The Woman Who Loved Kyoshiro	Nemuri Kyōshirō	Main role
1998	Jinbē	Takanashi Jinbē	Main role
2000	Oyajî	Kanichi Kanzaki	Main role
2001	Sayônara, Ozu-sensei	Ozu	Main role
2006	Furuhata Ninzaburo Final	Furuhata Ninzaburo	Main role
2006	Dare Yorimo Mama o Ai su	Kamon Kazutoyo	Main role
2007	Chushingura Otonashino Ken	Yūki Keinosuke	Main role
2009	Ah, You're Really Gone Now		Main role
2010	Chushingura Sono Otoko Ōishi Kuranosuke	Ōishi Yoshio	Main role
2009	Giwaku	Takukichi Sahara	Main role
2011	Kokuhatsu Kokusen Bengonin	Takuji Sahara	Main role
2013	Samurai Rebellion(上意討ち～拝領妻始末)	Isaburo Sasahara	Main role
2018	Nemuri Kyoshirō The Final	Nemuri Kyōshirō	Main role

== Awards ==
Year	Award	Category	Work	Result
1994	The television drama academy Awards	Best Actor	Furuhata Ninzaburo	Won
1996	The television drama academy Awards	Best Actor	Furuhata Ninzaburo	Won
2001	The television drama academy Awards	Best Actor	Sayônara, Ozu-sensei	Won
2009	Monte-Carlo Television Festival	Outstanding Actor	Ah, You're Really Gone Now	Won
