= Papa wa Newscaster =

- Genre: Drama Comedy
- Written by: Kazuhiko Ban
- Starring: Masakazu Tamura; Atsuko Asano; Mari Nishio; George Tokoro; Rumi Matsumoto
- Country of origin: Japan
- Original language: Japanese
- No. of episodes: 12

Production
- Production company: TBS

Original release
- Network: TBS
- Release: January 9 – March 27, 1987

Papa wa Newscaster... (パパはニュースキャスター…) is a Japanese comedy drama series that first aired on TBS in 1987. Masakazu Tamura gained new popularity through the drama. Also, three special editions of the drama were produced later.

Kagami Ryutarō is a News presenter. He is a playboy, but suddenly he becomes the father of three daughters.

== Cast ==
- Masakazu Tamura as Kagami Ryutarō
- Atsuko Asano as Yonezaki Miyuki
- Mieko Suzuki as Suzuki Megumi
- Chikako Otsuka as Otsuka Megumi
- Mari Nishio as Nishio Megumi
- Jūkei Fujioka as director of The Press
- George Tokoro as Matsumoto Tamotsu
- Rumi Matsumoto as Matsumoto Fumiko
- Shigeru Kobayashi as a Caster

== TV specials ==
- Papa wa Newscaster special (October 2, 1987) Guest starring Honami Suzuki, Jun Fubuki, Miho Nakayama
- Papa wa Newscaster Oshōgatsu special (January 2, 1989) Guest starring Naoko Ken, Yumi Shirakawa, Hibari Misora
- Papa wa Newscaster Kaetekita Kagami Ryutarō (September 30, 1994) Guest starring Isao Hashizume, Takako Tokiwa, Masatoshi Hamada
