= Mother (1963 film) =

1963 Japanese film

- Theatrical release poster
- Directed by: Kaneto Shindō
- Written by: Kaneto Shindō
- Produced by: Hisao Itoya; Setsuo Noto; Tamotsu Minato; Eisaku Matsuura
- Starring: Nobuko Otowa; Haruko Sugimura
- Cinematography: Kiyomi Kuroda
- Edited by: Toshio Enoki
- Music by: Hikaru Hayashi
- Production company: Kindai Eiga Kyōkai
- Release date: 8 November 1963 (Japan)
- Running time: 101 minutes
- Country: Japan
- Language: Japanese

Mother (Japanese: 母, Hepburn: Haha) is a 1963 Japanese drama film written and directed by Kaneto Shindō and starring Nobuko Otowa, Haruko Sugimura, Taiji Tonoyama and Yoshitaka Zushi.

== Plot ==
Tamiko is a single mother who has left her second husband. Her son Toshio is going blind and diagnosed with a brain tumour, an aftereffect of the atomic bombing of Hiroshima. As she does not have the money for surgery, she asks her mother Yoshie for help. Yoshie refuses, and instead arranges a marriage with another single parent, Tajima from Korea, on the condition that he pays for the surgery. Tamiko marries Tajima and works with him in his printing shop. Toshio is operated on and recovers, but the tumour returns. The surgeon refuses to operate again, saying that another operation would be fatal, and tells Tamiko to make Toshio's remaining lifetime as enjoyable as possible. Toshio starts learning braille in a school for the blind, and Tamiko's brother Haruo lends her money to buy an electric organ for Toshio. Haruo, a barman who is repeateadly involved in fights over women, is later killed by a rival. Toshio eventually dies of his illness. Tamiko discovers she is pregnant and is determined to have the baby, even if it is dangerous to her health.

== Cast ==
- Nobuko Otowa as Tamiko
- Haruko Sugimura as Yoshie
- Taiji Tonoyama as Tajima
- Yoshitaka Zushi as Toshio
- Takeshi Katō as Toshiro
- Seiji Miyaguchi as doctor
- Mayumi Ogawa as Madame
- Kei Satō as Dr. Koiguchi
- Kōji Takahashi as Haruo
- Tetsuji Takechi as Madame's boyfriend

== Theme ==
Many scenes are filmed against the background of the Genbaku Dome in Hiroshima. Shindō, who was born in Hiroshima Prefecture, repeatedly attempted to memorialise the bombing of his birthplace and its aftermath in films like Children of Hiroshima (1952), Mother, Sakura-tai Chiru (1988) and Teacher and Three Children (2008).

== Legacy ==
Mother was screened at a 2012 retrospective on Shindō and Kōzaburō Yoshimura in London, organised by the British Film Institute and the Japan Foundation.
