= Samurai Spy =

- Film poster
- Directed by: Masahiro Shinoda
- Written by: Yoshiyuki Fukuda
- Produced by: Shizuo Yamanouchi
- Starring: Kōji Takahashi; Mutsuhiro Toura; Tetsurō Tamba; Jitsuko Yoshimura; Eiji Okada; Yasunori Irikawa; Seiji Miyaguchi; Shintaro Ishihara
- Cinematography: Masao Kosugi
- Edited by: Yoshi Sugihara
- Music by: Toru Takemitsu
- Distributed by: Shochiku Co., Ltd.
- Release date: July 10, 1965 (Japan)
- Running time: 100 minutes
- Country: Japan
- Language: Japanese

Samurai Spy (Japanese: 異聞猿飛佐助, Hepburn: Ibun Sarutobi Sasuke), also known as Spy Hunter, is a 1965 film directed by Masahiro Shinoda and written by Yoshiyuki Fukuda based on a novel by Koji Nakada. The legendary ninja Sasuke Sarutobi tracks the spy Nojiri, while a mysterious figure named Sakon leads a band of men on their own quest for the wily Nojiri. Soon no one knows just who is who and what side anyone is on. Made during the height of the Cold War, the film follows the lives of spies caught up in the power struggles of their times.

== Plot ==
It is set in the period between the Battle of Sekigahara in 1600 and the Siege of Osaka in 1614. Years of warfare end in a Japan unified under the Tokugawa shogunate, but the peace is threatened. It follows Sarutobi Sasuke, a spy for the Sanada Clan. Sasuke, tired of conflict, longs for peace. When a high-ranking spy named Tatewaki Koriyama defects from the shogun to a rival clan, Sasuke is caught between two rival groups of spies, those working for the Tokugawa Shogunate and those supporting the Toyotomi Clan. Tokugawa Ieyasu's clan was in the strategically superior position after having won the Battle of Sekigahara but had engendered much hatred among samurai who had become rōnin after the Battle.

The Tokugawa spies are led by Sakon Takatani and Tatewaki Koriyama and the Toyotomi by Shigeyuki Koremura and his lieutenant Takanosuke Nojiri. The story begins when Sasuke is approached by another Toyotomi spy Mitsuaki Inamura, who tells Sasuke that Tatewaki means to betray Tokugawa and join the Toyotomi. Sasuke, believing that this intrigue will start another war, tells Mitsuaki that he wants no part in it, but Mitsuaki begs Sasuke to help him since the local magistrate Genba Kuni is on the lookout for him. Mitsuaki goes into the town with him and they see Genba Kuni cruelly parading a young Christian man that he has captured and Mitsuaki admits to betraying the Christian in order to distract Kuni and allow him to get through his district.

As they are on the road Sasuke notices a beautiful woman with an older man whom they had seen in town. Mitsuaki is attacked outside of town and Sasuke comes to his rescue but later, at an inn in the next town, Mitsuaki is assassinated. Sasuke finds him dead and is chased, the murderer since he is seen coming out of the room. He escapes but soon meets the beautiful woman who entices him to come to her room, and when she turns up dead Sasuke is suspected. Sasuke decides he must find the true killer or killers and at the same time finds himself involved in the intrigue which he sought to avoid (to find Tatewaki and help him to betray Tokugawa and join the Toyotomi).

== Cast ==
- Koji Takahashi as Sasuke Sarutobi, spy
- Shintaro Ishihara as Saizo Kirigakure, spy
- Eitaro Ozawa as Shigeyuki Koremura, leader of spies
- Kei Satō as Takanosuke Nojiri, lieutenant
- Mutsuhiro Toura as Mitsuaki Inamura, spy
- Tetsurō Tamba as Sakon Takatani, lieutenant
- Eiiji Okada as Tatewaki Koriyama, lieutenant
- Seiji Miyaguchi as Jinnai-Kazutaka Horikawa, clan minister
- Minoru Hodaka as Genba Kuni, magistrate
- Misako Watanabe as Okiwa, dancer and spy
- Yasunori Irikawa as Yashiro Kobayashi, Christian samurai
- Jitsuko Yoshimura as Omiyo, orphan in Joshinji Temple
- Jun Hamamura as Joshinji, Temple priest
