= Hajime Kaburagi =

Japanese composer (1926–2014)

Hajime Kaburagi (鏑木 創, Kaburagi Hajime; 27 February 1926 – October 2014) was a Japanese music composer. His another name was Taichi Tsukimizato. Kaburagi is best known as a composer of hit song Ginza no Koi no Monogatari which was sung by Yūjirō Ishihara and Junko Makimura.

== Selected works ==
=== Film scores ===
- Red Quay (1958)
- Invasion of the Neptune Men (1961)
- Akumyō Series (1962-69)
- The Orphan Brothers (1961)
- Kunoichi ninpō (1964)
- Kenju burai-chō Nagaremono no Mure (1965)
- Tokyo Drifter (1966)
- Tokyo Drifter 2: The Sea is Bright Red as the Color of Love (1966)
- The Singing Gunman (1967)
- A Certain Killer (1967)
- Blackmail Is My Life (1968)
- Curse of the Blood (1968)
- Higashi Shinakai (1968)
- I, the Executioner (1968)
- Zatoichi and the Fugitives (1968)
- The Yoshiwara Story (1968)
- Retaliation (1968)
- Daimon Otokode Shinitai (1969)
- Black Rose Mansion (1969)
- Horrors of Malformed Men (1969)
- Stray Cat Rock: Sex Hunter (1970)
- Earth Ninja Chronicles: Duel in the Wind (1970)
- Onna-rō Hizu (1970)
- Blind Woman's Curse (1970)
- Harenchi Gakuen (1970)
- The Masseur's Curse (1970)
- The Insatiable (1971)
- Castle Orgies (1971)
- A Man′s World (1971)
- Naked Seven (1972)
- Beads from a Petal (1972)
- Female Prisoner Scorpion: 701's Grudge Song (1973)
- Bohachi Bushido: Code of the Forgotten Eight (1973)
- Female Yakuza Tale: Inquisition and Torture (1973)
- Hissatsu Shikakenin (1973)
- Hissatsu Shikakenin Baian Arijigoku (1973)
- Female Ninja Magic: 100 Trampled Flowers (1974)
- Executioner (1974)
- Conflagration (1975)
- Lady Moonflower (1976)
- Assault! Jack the Ripper (1976)
- Karate from Shaolin Temple aka Shorinji Kempo: Musashi Hong Kong ni arawaru (1976)
- Fairy in a Cage (1977)
- KochiKame: Tokyo Beat Cops Movie (1977)
- Karate for Life (1977)
- Rope and Skin (1979)
- Nihon no Fixer (1979)
- The Street of Desire (1984)

=== Television ===
- Doberman Deka (1980)
- Edigawa Ranpo no Bijo series aka Akeichi Kogorō series (1977-94)

=== Vocal ===
- Ginza no Koi no Monogatari (Yūjirō Ishihara and Junko Makimura)
- Akai Hatoba (Yūjirō Ishihara)
- Akumyō (Shintarō Katsu)
- Tabi Garasu (Akira Kobayashi)
- Otoko no Okite (Tetsuya Watari)
- Nosappu no Jyu (Joe Shishido)
- Kurashi no Kawa (Yūzō Kayama)
- Umie Kaero (Saburō Kitajima)
- Irodoru Ai (Komaki Kurihara)
