= Ghost Writer (Japanese TV series) =

- Genre: Drama
- Written by: Atsuko Hashibe
- Directed by: Masato Hijikata; Genta Sato; Daiden Yamauchi
- Starring: Miki Nakatani; Asami Mizukawa; Shohei Miura; Nanao; Midoriko Kimura; Kyoko Enami; Ryo Ishibashi; Tetsushi Tanaka
- Opening theme: Unlock by Daichi Miura
- Ending theme: Ghost by Androp
- Country of origin: Japan
- Original language: Japanese
- No. of episodes: 10

Production
- Producer: Hiroshi Kobayashi
- Running time: 54 minutes Tuesdays at 21:00 (JST)

Original release
- Network: Fuji TV
- Release: January 13 – March 17, 2015

Ghost Writer (ゴーストライター, Gōsutoraitā) is a 2015 Japanese television drama, starring Miki Nakatani, Asami Mizukawa, Shohei Miura, Nanao, Midoriko Kimura, Kyoko Enami, Ryo Ishibashi and Tetsushi Tanaka. The series was aired on Fuji TV from January 13 to March 17, 2015 on Tuesdays at 21:00 (JST) for 10 episodes.

== Synopsis ==
Yuki Kawahara came to Tokyo to give herself a year to become a published novelist. On the brink of failure, she has a chance encounter with Futo Oda, a junior executive at a major publisher to whom she tries to give her novel. Oda, however, is preoccupied with finding an assistant for an irascible, but highly successful novelist, Risa Tono, whose works his company publishes. He persuades Yuki to take the job, which she agrees to do on a temporary basis, for she will soon return to her home town to marry her fiancé.

At first, she is given menial jobs but soon, Risa discovers that her new assistant is a talented writer and she gives her small writing jobs. It turns out that Risa is burned out and can no longer write. Gradually, Yuki becomes her indispensable ghost writer. Thinking she will get an opportunity to develop her career through her association with Risa, Yuki does not return home as planned. But tensions arise between the two women and eventually they fall out. How their relationship proceeds is the heart of the story of the series.

== Cast ==
- Miki Nakatani as Risa Tono
- Asami Mizukawa as Yuki Kawahar
- Shohei Miura as Futo Oda
- Nanao as Manami Tsukada
- Yuichi Haba as Shinya Okano
- Kenji Mizuhashi as Tomiyuki Tsubota
- Yu Koyanagi as Hirosayu Ozaki
- Mahiro Takasugi as Daiki Tono
- Midoriko Kimura as Misuzu Taura
- Kyoko Enami as Motoko Tono
- Ryo Ishibashi as Masayoshi Torikai
- Tetsushi Tanaka as Yuji Kanzaki

== Episodes ==
No.	Original air date	Episode title	Romanized title	Director	Ratings (%)
1	January 13, 2015	罪への秒読み〜偽りの日々の始まり	Tsumi e no byōyomi 〜 itsuwari no hibi no hajimari	Masato Hijikata	10.5%
2	January 20, 2015	夢か結婚か、それとも嘘か...泥沼の決断	Yume ka kekkon ka, soretomo uso ka… doronuma no ketsudan	Masato Hijikata	9.2%
3	January 27, 2015	罠か、チャンスか、デビューの甘い誘惑	Wana ka, chansu ka, debyū no amai yūwaku	Genta Sato	8.7%
4	February 3, 2015	原稿をください...消えた天才作家の誇り	Genkō o kudasai… kieta tensai sakka no hokori	Daiden Yamauchi	7.6%
5	February 10, 2015	舞台に上がったゴースト。逆襲の始まり	Butai ni agatta gōsuto. Gyakushū no hajimari	Genta Sato	7.0%
6	February 17, 2015	私は真実を述べます...嘘つきにくだされる法の裁き	Watashi wa shinjitsu o nobemasu… usotsuki ni kudasa reru hō no sabaki	Masato Hijikata	7.9%
7	February 24, 2015	私は消えたい...勝利のシナリオの結末	Watashi wa kieta... Shōri no shinario no ketsumatsu	Daiden Yamauchi	8.9%
8	March 3, 2015	作家・遠野リサの死。よみがえる若き才能	Sakka Tōno Risa no shi. Yomigaeru wakaki sainō	Masato Hijikata	8.6%
9	March 10, 2015	天才は帰ってくるのか？退屈で平和な日々の果てに	Tensai wa kaette kuru no ka? Taikutsu de heiwana hibi no hate ni	Genta Sato	8.7%
10	March 17, 2015	最終回・女王の帰還。罪深き二人の女の逆襲	Saishūkai joō no kikan. Tsumibukaki futarinoon'na no gyakushū	Masato Hijikata	9.2%
Average: 8.6%（Viewing rates are examined by Video Research in Kantō region）

Preceded by Subete ga F ni Naru; October 21, 2014 – December 23, 2014	Fuji TV Tuesday Drama; Tuesdays 21:00 – 21:54 (JST)	Succeeded by Medical Team: Lady Davinci no Shindan; October 2016 –
