= Takahiro Tamura =

Japanese actor (1928–2006)

- 田村 高廣
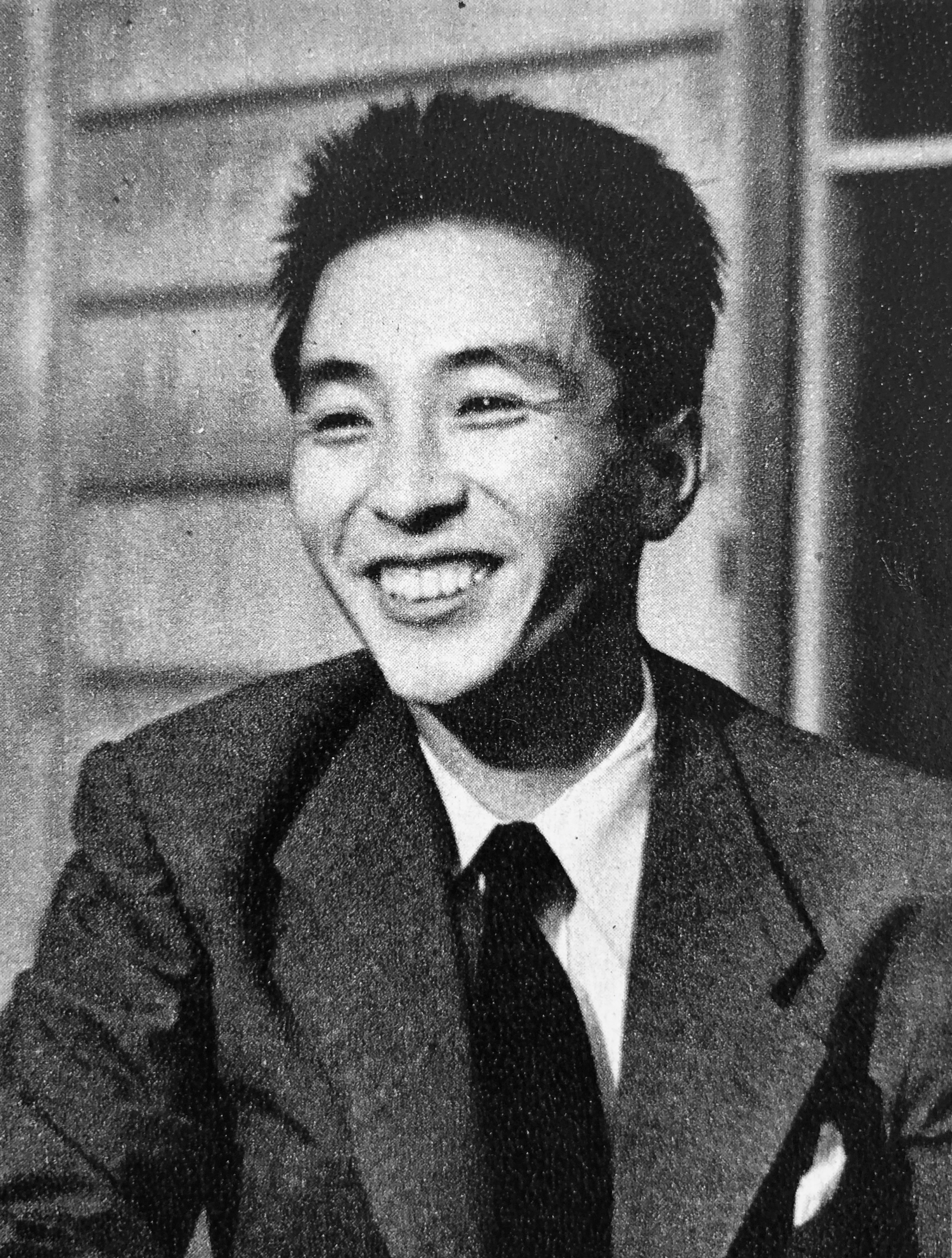
- Takahiro Tamura in 1954
- Born: 31 August 1928; Kyoto, Japan
- Died: 16 May 2006 (aged 77); Tokyo
- Education: Doshisha University
- Occupation: Actor
- Years active: 1954–2006
- Known for: The Hoodlum Soldier; Twenty-Four Eyes; Tora! Tora! Tora!; Muddy River; Tempyō no Iraka; Tasukenin Hashiru
- Father: Tsumasaburō Bandō
- Relatives: Masakazu Tamura (younger brother); Ryō Tamura (younger brother)

Takahiro Tamura (田村高廣, Tamura Takahiro; 31 August 1928 – 16 May 2006) was a Japanese film actor. He appeared in 100 films between 1954 and 2005. He and his younger brothers Masakazu and Ryō were known as the three Tamura brothers. They were sons of actor Tsumasaburo Bando.

== Biography ==
Tamura graduated from Doshisha University. Tamura was working for a trading firm before he started his acting career but he decided to be an actor to repay his father Tsumasaburō's debt. In 1953, he joined Shochiku and made his film debut with Onna no Sono. In 1965, he won the Best Supporting Actor award at the 16th Blue Ribbon Awards for his role in The Hoodlum Soldier. In 1970, he played the role of Mitsuo Fuchida in Tora! Tora! Tora!. Tamura won the Mainichi Film Award for Best Actor award for his role in Muddy River in 1981.

On television, Tamura appeared in a lot of jidaigeki television dramas. In 1964, He appeared for the first time in an NHK taiga drama, Akō Rōshi. NHK tapped him the following year for the role of Kuroda Yoshitaka in Taikōki. Among the jidaigeki series he has starred in Hissatsu series Tasukenin Hashiru.

He died of cerebral infarction on 19 May 2006. His final film appearance was in The Yakiniku mubi: Purukogi, released in 2007.

== Selected filmography ==
=== Film ===
- The Garden of Women (1954), Sankichi Shimoda, Yoshie's boyfriend
- Twenty-Four Eyes (1954), Isokichi
- Tooi kumo (1955), Keizō Ishizu
- She Was Like a Wild Chrysanthemum (1955)
- Farewell to Dream (1956), Sudō
- Namida (1956)
- Kyoraku gonin otoko (1956)
- Sora yukaba (1957), Jirō Yoshino
- Akuma no kao (1957), Kikuo Furushima
- Times of Joy and Sorrow (1957), Mr. Nozu
- Musume sanbagarasu (1957)
- Ten no me (1957)
- Samurai Nippon (1957)
- Otoko no kiba (1957)
- Stakeout (1958), Kyūichi Ishii, the murderer
- Kono ten no niji (1958), Shirō Machimura
- Haru o matsu hitobito (1959)
- Karatachi nikki (1959)
- Kaze no naka no hitomi (1959), Mr. Terajima
- Thus Another Day (1959), Tetsuo Mori
- Teki wa honnoji ni ari (1959), Oda Nobunaga
- Asa o yobu kuchibue (1959)
- The River Fuefuki (1960), Sadahei
- Hatamoto Gurentai (1960)
- Onna no hashi (1961), Toshiya Kawazu
- Kako (1961)
- Haitoku no mesu (1961), Hideo Ue
- Nippon no obaachan (1962), Fukuda
- Mitasareta seikatsu (1962), Sadakichi
- Sanga ari (1961), Yoshio Inoue
- Yama no sanka: moyuru wakamono tachi (1962)
- Kaachan kekkon shiroyo (1962)
- Utae Wakôdotachi (1963)
- Mushukunin-betsuchô (1963), Yokouchi
- Kekkonshiki Kekkonshiki (1963), Ryûji Matsuda
- Tange Sazen: zankoku no kawa (1963)
- Ninja-gari (1964), Tosa Aizawa
- Nihon kyôkaku-den (1964), Tsurumatsu
- Revenge (1964), Jubei
- Goben no tsubaki (1964), Chodayu
- Tokugawa Ieyasu (1965)
- The Forest of No Escape (1965), Hidemichi Kusuo
- The Hoodlum Soldier (1965), Arita
- Seisaku no tsuma (1965), Seisaku
- Miyamoto Musahi V (1965), Yagyu Tajima
- Hoodlum Soldier and the C.O (1965)
- Kanto hamonjo (1965)
- Hana to Ryu (1965)
- Shinobi no Mono 4: Siege (1966), Daijuro Fuma
- Yojōhan monogatari: Shōfu shino (1966), Tadashi Yoshioka
- Nyohan hakai (1966), Hinata
- Hoodlum Soldier Deserts Again (1966)
- Sora ippai no namida (1966)
- The Kii River (1966) – Shintani Keisaku, Hana's husband
- Heitai yakuza datsugoku (1966)
- The Great White Tower (1966), Shûji Satomi, Assistant professor
- Shin heitai yakuza (1966)
- Heitai yakuza daidassō (1966)
- Hana To Ryu: Do Kâiwan No Kêttō (1966)
- Satogashi ga kowareru toki (1967), Katsumi Gorai
- Daraku suru onna (1967), Miyoshi
- Heitai yakuza nagurikomi (1967)
- Utage (1967), Asaichi Isobe
- Heitai yakuza ore ni makasero (1967)
- Hoodlum Soldier on the Attack (1967)
- Âa Kimi ga Ai (1967), Yûichi Ono
- Sleepy Eyes of Death: Hell Is a Woman (1968), Naruse Tatsuma
- Nemureru bijo (1968), Eguchi
- Ôoku emaki (1968), Shogun
- Gion Matsuri (1968), Sukematsu
- Heitai yakuza godatsu (1968)
- Keimusho yaburi (1969)
- Red Lion (1969), Sōzō Sagara
- Shinsengumi (1969), Koshitarō Itō
- Akumyo ichiban shobu (1969), Masakichi
- Mushyô yaburi (1969)
- Men and War Part I (1970)
- Tora! Tora! Tora! (1970), Lt. Commander Mitsuo Fuchida
- Tenkan no abarembo (1970)
- Tekkaba bojô (1970)
- Senketsu no kiroku (1970)
- Shin heitai yakuza: Kasen (1972), Arita
- Hanzo the Razor (1972), Harada Kahei
- Seigen-ki (1973), Minoru Oyama
- The Twilight Years (1973), Nobuyoshi Tachibana
- Karafuto 1945 Summer Hyosetsu no mon (1975)
- The Last Samurai (1974), Ikemoto Mohei
- Tsuma to Onna no Aida (1976), Masayuki
- Death at an Old Mansion (1976), Ichiyanagi Kenzō
- Furenzoku satsujin jiken (1977), Senbei Yashirō
- Empire of Passion (1978), Gisaburō
- Never Give Up (1978), Urakawa, pressman
- Ore-tachi no kokyogaku (1979)
- Shōdō satsujin: Musuko yo (1979), Hirayama
- Jigoku no mushi (1979), Danjurō
- Nichiren (1979), Nukina Shigetada
- Dōran (1980), Kanzaki
- Tempyō no Iraka (1980), Jianzhen
- The Young Rebels (1980)
- Harukanaru Sōro (1980), Toyota Sakichi
- Muddy River (1981), Shinpei Itakura
- Himeyuri no Tō (1982), Lt. Col. Sasaki
- Dai Nippon teikoku (1982), Sada Shimomura
- Kare no ootobai, kanojo no shima (1986), Kouichiroh Shiraishi
- Katayoku dake no tenshi (1986)
- Oedipus no Yaiba (1986), Shuehei Osako
- The Sea and Poison (1986), Professor Hashimoto
- Hachiko Monogatari (1987), Furukawa
- Itazu Kuma (1987), Ginzō the Hunter
- The Silk Road (1988), Tsao Yanhui
- 226 (1989), Sohei Yuasa
- Senba-zuru (1989), Doctor
- Toki rakujitsu (1992), Ryutarō
- Rakuyô (1992), Yamashiro
- Watashi o daite soshite kisu shite (1992), Shigeki Kabayama
- Gekko no natsu (1993)
- Crest of Betrayal (1994), Kira Yoshinaka
- Sleeping Man (1996), Denjihei
- Sanctuary: The Movie (1996)
- Hisai (1998), Yoshio Miyarabe
- Chinpao chin ho-teki koji (1999)
- Komugironotenshi sugare oi (1999), Kumatarō
- I Love Friends (2001)
- Letters from the Mountains (2002), Shigenaga Kōda
- Jōhatsu Tabinikki (2003)
- I Love Peace (2003), Kashiwabara
- The Yakiniku Mubi: Purukogi (2007), Kan
- Kuchita Teoshi Guruma (produced in 1984 but released in 2014), Yasuda Tadao

=== Television ===
- Akō Rōshi (1964), Takada Gunbei
- Taikōki (1965), Kuroda Kanbei
- Daichūshingura (1971), Takadaya Gunbei
- Haru no Sakamichi (1971), Takuan
- Tasukenin Hashiru (1973), Nakayama Bunjūrō
- The Water Margin (1973), Chai Jin
- Onihei Hankachō (1975), Kishii Samanosuke
- On'yado Kawasemi (1980-1983), Kamibayashi
- The Women of Osaka Castle (1983), Azai Nagamasa
- Kawaite sōrō (1984), Tokugawa Yoshimune
- Miyamoto Musashi (1984–85), Nagaoka Sado
- Ōedo Sōsamō (1990-91), Matsudaira Sadanobu
- Onihei Hankachō Season2 episode12 Guest starring (1991), Amagoi Shozaemon
- Kemonomichi (2006), Doctor

== Honours ==
- Mainichi Film Award for Best Actor (1981)
- Medal with Purple Ribbon (1991)
- Order of the Rising Sun, 4th Class, Gold Rays with Rosette (1999)
