= Wandering Home =

- Film poster
- Directed by: Yōichi Higashi
- Screenplay by: Yōichi Higashi
- Based on: Yoi ga sametara, uchi ni kaero by Yutaka Kamoshida
- Produced by: Yuji Sadai; Mitsuru Oshima; Hiroki Ohwada; Tetsujiro Yamagami; Eiji Watanabe
- Starring: Tadanobu Asano; Hiromi Nagasaku; Yosuke Fujioka; Kurea Mori; Yoshiko Kayama
- Cinematography: Shinji Kugimiya
- Edited by: Yōichi Higashi
- Music by: Pascals
- Production companies: SIGLO Ltd.; Bop; Bitters End
- Distributed by: Bitters End
- Release date: December 4, 2010 (Japan)
- Running time: 118 minutes
- Country: Japan
- Language: Japanese

Wandering Home (Japanese: 酔いがさめたら、うちに帰ろう。, Hepburn: Yoi ga sametara, uchi ni kaero; lit. I'll Get Home When Sober) is a 2010 Japanese comedy drama film directed by Yōichi Higashi. It was adapted by Higashi from an autobiographical novel of the same name by former war photographer Yutaka Kamoshida. The film tells the story of an alcoholic man admitted to a psychiatric ward by his family. It stars Tadanobu Asano in the lead role, in addition to Hiromi Nagasaku, Yosuke Fujioka, Kurea Mori and Yoshiko Kayama. Pascals composed the film's score, while its theme song "Let's Live Proudly" was performed by Kiyoshiro Imawano. Wandering Home was theatrically released by Bitters End on December 4, 2010, in Japan.

== Premise ==
The film follows the downward spiral of Yasuyuki Tsukahara, a former war photographer who has become an alcoholic. One day, having drunk too much vodka, he returns home and vomits blood into the toilet before passing out. His mother finds him in the bathroom and calls an ambulance. She also calls Yuki Sonoda, a manga illustrator and Yasuyuki's ex-wife. Rushing to the hospital, Yuki consults the doctor, who says "Alcoholism is the one disease that almost no one sympathizes with."

After three months, Yasuyuki gets out of the hospital and pledges to sober up. However, he quickly breaks his pledge. His mother, finally fed up, takes him to an all-male psychiatric ward for alcoholics. Yasuyuki reluctantly agrees to be admitted. He soon comes to enjoy the ward's quiet routines. With the help of his female psychiatrist, Yasuyuki realizes that quitting alcohol will only be the beginning of his journey to recovery. He will have to own up to the deeds he committed when drunk. After getting out of the ward, with the help of his family, Yasuyuki recovers mentally, but his body may have already paid too high a price. Nonetheless, he comes to see what truly matters in his life and what he will miss if he continues to drink.

== Cast ==
- Tadanobu Asano as Yasuyuki Tsukahara – Modeled after the author Yutaka Kamoshida.
- Hiromi Nagasaku as Yuki Sonoda – Modeled after the author's ex-wife, Rieko Saibara.
- Yosuke Fujioka as Hiroshi Sonoda
- Kurea Mori as Kaoru Sonoda
- Yoshiko Kayama as Hiroko Tsukahara
- Mikako Ichikawa as Asami Minato
- Mari Nishio as Nurse Ishiyama
- Shoko Takada as Dr. Koromota
- Rumi Hiiragi as Nurse Inose
- Toshiyuki Kitami as Sakai
- Ken Mitsuishi as Kito Onigashira
- Taka Okubo as Matsumoto
- Kenichi Takitō as Okawa
- Kotaro Shiga as Ito
- Gō Rijū as Director of Mikasa Clinic
- Masahiro Komoto as Dr. Yamada
- Yukijirō Hotaru as Yoshida
- Keisuke Horibe as Patient
- Makiko Watanabe as Patient
- Rieko Nishihara as Patient
- Sei Andō
- Kanji Furutachi
- Takamitsu Nonaka

== Background ==
Kamoshida's novel was originally published in 2006 by Starts Publishing. Kamoshida died a year later of kidney cancer. The author's ex-wife, manga artist Rieko Saibara, created the illustrations in the film and also appears as a psychiatric patient.

Lead actor Asano had previously played an alcoholic in Villon's Wife.

== Release ==
Wandering Home was theatrically released by Bitters End on December 4, 2010, in Japan. The film was later released to DVD and Blu-ray on April 20, 2011.

The film was screened by the Japan Society on July 21, 2011.

== Reception ==
Writing for Variety, Russell Edwards said the film was a "disappointing effort" from Higashi, calling it "watered-down", "ill-conceived" and "whimsical". He also believed that Asano was "out of his emotional depth as the lead, and not up to the script’s comic challenges."

In a review for The Japan Times, Mark Schilling wrote that Wandering Home "is not the usual art film about alcoholism" and that it is instead a "down-to-earth, low-drama view of the drinking life, with surreal comic touches." He also said that "Wandering Home shows us not just the pathos of Yasuyuki's fate, but also what can only be called the beauty of his acceptance."

== Awards and nominations ==
36th Hochi Film Awards

- Won: Best Actress (Hiromi Nagasaku, also won for Rebirth)

20th Japanese Movie Critics Awards

- Won: Best Director (Yōichi Higashi)
