= Kyoko Enami =

Japanese actress (1942–2018)

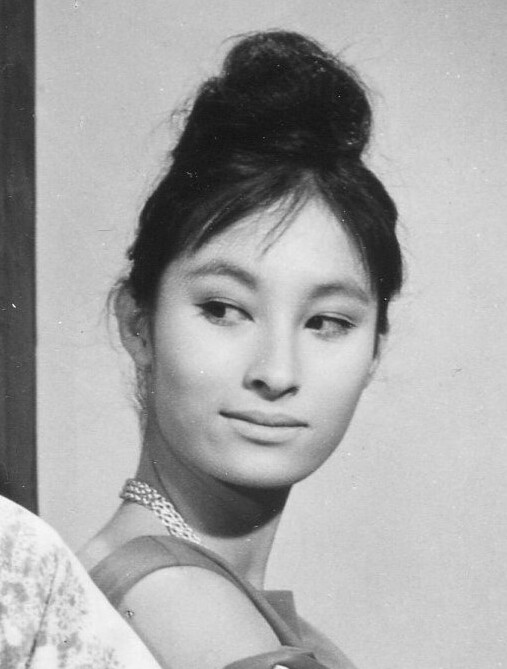
- Enami in 1962
- Born: 15 October 1942; Tokyo, Japan
- Died: 27 October 2018 (aged 76); Tokyo, Japan
- Occupation: actress
- Years active: 1960–2018

Kyoko Enami (江波 杏子, Enami Kyōko; 15 October 1942 – 27 October 2018) was a Japanese film and television actress.

== Career ==
Enami was the daughter of the actress Kazuko Enami. She joined the Daiei Film studio in 1959 and made her screen debut in 1960 with Ashita kara otona da. Her first starring role as Noboriryū no Ogin in Onna no toba (1966) was a major hit, and developed into the "Woman Gambler" series that totaled 17 films. She also had serious roles, and won the best actress award from Kinema Junpo for Tsugaru Jongarabushi (1973). She died rather suddenly at a Tokyo hospital on 27 October 2018 of pulmonary emphysema, having performed on a radio drama only five days before.

== Selected filmography ==
=== Films ===
- Ashita kara otona da (1960)
- Her Brother (1960)
- The Whale God (1962)
- Gamera vs. Barugon (1966)
- Onna no toba (1966)
- Tsugaru Jongarabushi (1973)
- A Tale of Sorrow and Sadness (1977)
- The Fall of Ako Castle (1978)
- Nihon no Fixer (1979)
- KT (2002)
- Ouran High School Host Club (2012)

=== Television ===
- G-Men '75 (1982)
- Kawaite sōrō (1984)
- Ōoku (2005), Keishō'in
- Carnation (2011–2012)
- Ghost Writer (2015)
- Kabukimono Keiji (2015)

== Honours ==
- Kinuyo Tanaka Award (2010)
