= Curse of the Blood =

1968 film directed by Kazuo Hase

- Film poster
- Directed by: Kazuo Hase
- Written by: Renzaburō Shibata
- Screenplay by: Masashige Narusawa
- Based on: Kaidan Kasanegafuchi
- Starring: Masakazu Tamura; Koeda Kawaguchi
- Cinematography: Keiji Maruyama
- Edited by: Kazuo Ota
- Music by: Hajime Kaburagi
- Production company: Shochiku Ofuna
- Distributed by: Shochiku
- Release date: May 31, 1968 (Japan)
- Running time: 88 minutes
- Country: Japan
- Language: Japanese

Curse of the Blood (Japanese: 怪談残酷物語, Hepburn: Kaidan Zankoku Monogatari) is a 1968 Japanese jidaigeki horror film directed by Kazuo Hase and screenplay by Masashige Narusawa. It stars Masakazu Tamura. Curse of the Blood was adapted from the novel Kaidan Kasanegafuchi written by Renzaburō Shibata.

== Plot ==
Fukaya Shinzaemon is a samurai of Hatamoto, he borrows a large amount of money from Dr. Yasukawa Sōjun. When Yasukawa demands repayment of the debt, Fukaya kills Yasukawa. From the day on, strange things happens to the Fukaya family one after another by Yasukawa's curse.

== Cast ==
- Masakazu Tamura as Shinichirō
- Koeda Kawaguchi
- Yūsuke Kawazu as Shiznō
- Yukie Kagawa as Hana
- Rokkō Toura as Fukaya Shinzaemon
- Hiroko Sakurai as Ohisa
- Genshu Hanayagi as Toyo
- Masumi Harukawa as Okuma
- Nobuo Kaneko as Dr.Yasukawa Sōjun
