= Nihon no Fixer =

1979 film directed by Yasuo Furuhata

- DVD cover
- Directed by: Yasuo Furuhata
- Screenplay by: Kōji Takada
- Produced by: Gōrō Kusakabe
- Starring: Shin Saburi; Masakazu Tamura; Kayo Matsuo; Kyoko Enami; Akira Nakao
- Cinematography: Toru Nakajima
- Edited by: Isamu Ichida
- Music by: Hajime Kaburagi
- Production company: Toei
- Distributed by: Toei
- Release date: October 27, 1979 (Japan)
- Running time: 131 minutes
- Country: Japan
- Language: Japanese

Nihon no Fixer (Japanese: 日本の黒幕, Hepburn: The Fixer) is a 1979 Japanese film directed by Yasuo Furuhata. Inspired by the Lockheed bribery scandals and modeled on real-life figures Kakuei Tanaka and Yoshio Kodama, the film depicts the collusion between Japanese right-wing organizations and the political and business world. Nagisa Ōshima was set to direct the film originally.

== Plot ==
Recently-elected Japanese Prime Minister Hirayama arrives in office with a higher approval rating than his predecessor, due to policy proposals that he says will benefit the lower and middle classes. He promises to implement these policies once in office, while also advocating for a massive military buildup in Japan. However, unbeknownst to the public, Hirayama made a shady pre-election deal with a kuromaku (a behind-the-scenes power broker/fixer) named Yamaoka and the giant aircraft manufacturing company Randolph Corporation (based on Lockheed Martin). In exchange for the government purchasing Randolph's aircraft, the company and Yamaoka help Hirayama win the election.

After the election, Yamaoka, who is also a prominent Yakuza figure, hides out at his mansion. He is being pursued by the authorities for tax evasion, as well as for violating the Foreign Exchange Law in a fraud case involving the sale of Randolph Corporation's aircraft. His mansion is heavily guarded by security on fears of an assassination attempt. The mansion is also being crowded by reporters. One day, a boy manages to sneak into Yamaoka's mansion and tries to kill him. The boy fails after Yamaoka's right-hand man Imaizumi stops him. However, instead of killing the boy, Yamaoka takes him under his wing and makes him his subordinate.

== Cast ==
- Shin Saburi as Homei Yamaoka – Modeled after Yoshio Kodama
- Masakazu Tamura as Imaizumi
- Kayo Matsuo as Masako Yamaoka
- Kyoko Enami as Toshiko Yamaoka
- Akira Nakao as Dan
- Seizō Fukumoto as Nakahashi
- Harumi Sone as Yutaka Ikeuchi
- Junkichi Orimoto as Tsunuma
- Ryunosuke Kaneda as Prime Minister Hirayama – Modeled after former Japanese Prime Minister Kakuei Tanaka
- Maki Tachibana as Kayoko Sawai
- Masataka Iwao as Yuji Maejima
- Etsushi Takahashi as Masao Kaga
- Nenji Kobayashi as Shunsuke Mizumaki
- Ichirō Nakatani as Yoshino
- Kunie Tanaka as Tatsuo Ryuzaki
- Noboru Nakaya as Suzumura
- Ichirō Arishima as Heikichi Shibuya
- Mikio Narita as Yasuzo Morishima
- Chomei Soganoya as Tasuo Osanai
- Tatsuo Umemiya as Takayoshi Oguri
