= Female Prisoner Scorpion: 701's Grudge Song =

Female Prisoner Scorpion: #701's Grudge Song
- Theatrical release poster
- Directed by: Yasuharu Hasebe
- Written by: Toru Shinohara (manga)
- Starring: Meiko Kaji; Masakazu Tamura
- Cinematography: Hanjiro Nakazawa
- Edited by: Tomio Fukuda
- Music by: Hajime Kaburagi
- Distributed by: Toei Company
- Release date: December 29, 1973
- Running time: 89 minutes
- Country: Japan
- Language: Japanese

Female Prisoner Scorpion: #701's Grudge Song (女囚さそり 701号怨み節, Joshū Sasori - 701 Gō Urami Bushi) is a women in prison film made by Toei Company in 1973. The fourth, and last in the first Female Prisoner Scorpion series, Meiko Kaji returned to play the title role, but director Shunya Itō was replaced by Yasuharu Hasebe.

== Plot ==
Police led by Detective Hirose track down the escaped convict Nami Matsushima in a wedding chapel and handcuff her, but she is able to escape. She is rescued by Kudo, a worker in a sex show club and a former student radical with a history of problems with the police. Kudo provides Matsushima with shelter and food, and they later sleep together. Midori, a performer in the sex show who had unsuccessfully tried to seduce Kudo, finds Matsushima's handcuffs in Kudo's things and informs the police. The police arrest and beat Kudo, then release and tail him back to Matsushima's hiding place.

Matsushima is captured and sentenced to death. Just before her execution, she is allowed to escape by a warden who is cooperating with the police to set her up. Matsushima is taken to a gallows outside the prison where Hirose plans to hang her. She beats Hirose and he ends up hanged instead of her. Matsushima returns to Kudo, whom she stabs to death as he embraces her. He asks her to forgive him as he dies. The freed Matsushima disappears into the city.

== Cast ==
- Meiko Kaji as Nami Matsushima, the Scorpion
- Masakazu Tamura as Teruo Kudo
- Yumi Kanei as Kodama
- Hiroshi Tsukata as Hirose
- Yayoi Watanabe as Midori
- Sanae Nakahara as Akiko
- Akemi Negishi as Minamura

== Release ==
=== Home video ===
#701's Grudge Song was first released on DVD for Region 1 by Tokyo Shock on April 25, 2005. UK home video company Arrow Films released the film on Blu-ray on July 26, 2016, within a box-set containing the first four films of the Female Prisoner Scorpion series. Limited to 3000 copies, the box set contained new 2K restorations of all four films included in the set as well as numerous special features, with #701's Grudge Song including a new filmed appreciation by director Kazuyoshi Kumakiri (Kichiku: Battle of the Beasts), a new interview with film critic Jasper Sharp, an archival interview with director Yasuharu Hasebe, a new video essay about the film series by critic Tom Mes, as well as the theatrical trailer of the film.

== Sequels ==
Director Yutaka Kohira revived the series for two more episodes in 1976 and 1977. Evil Dead Trap director Toshiharu Ikeda filmed the original story again for V-Cinema in 1991.
