= Osamu Takizawa =

Japanese actor (1906–2000)

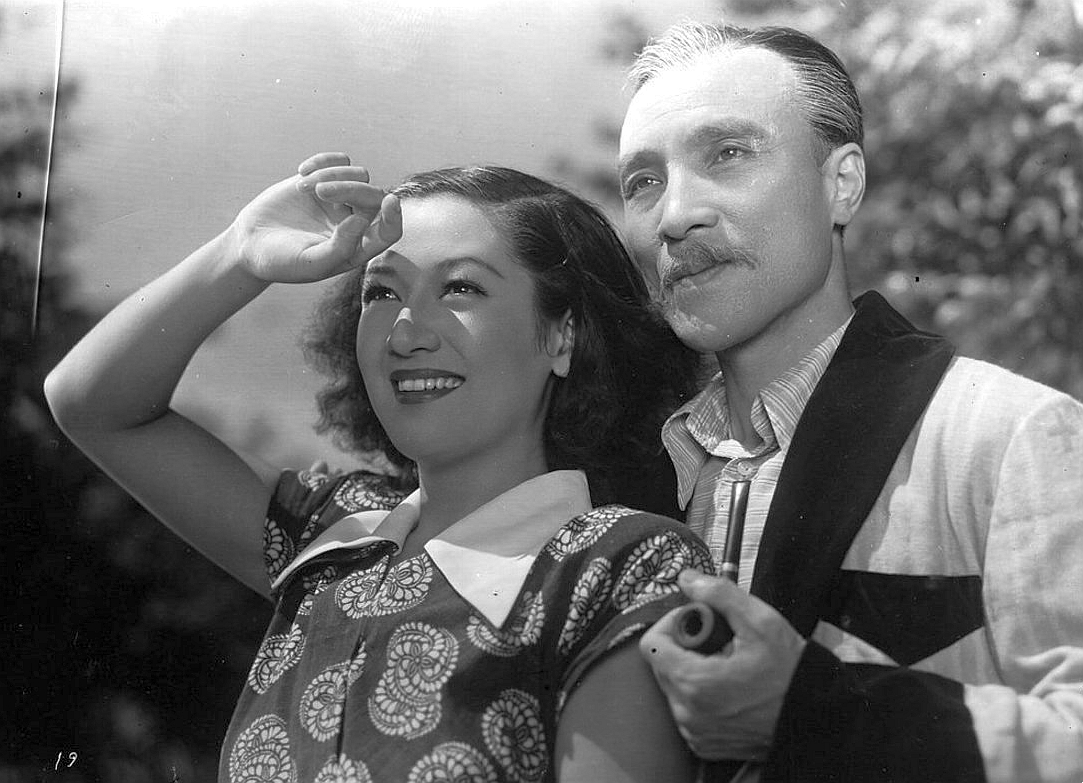
- In A Ball at the Anjo House (1947) with Setsuko Hara
- Born: 13 November 1906; Ushigome, Tokyo, Japan
- Died: 22 June 2000 (aged 93); Mitaka, Tokyo, Japan
- Occupation: Actor
- Years active: 1925–1997

Osamu Takizawa (滝沢 修, Takizawa Osamu; 13 November 1906 – 22 June 2000) was a Japanese actor. He was born in Ushigome, Shinjuku, Tokyo. Starting at the Tsukiji Little Theater, Takizawa participated in a number of theatrical troupes before forming Gekidan Mingei with Jūkichi Uno. He was praised for his performance in Death of a Salesman and also directed a version of The Diary of Anne Frank. Perhaps his most notable film role was in Fires on the Plain.

== Partial filmography ==
=== Film ===
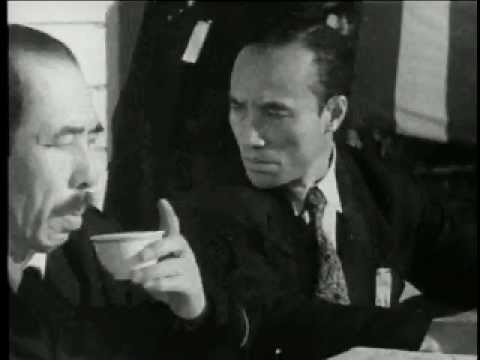
Takizawa in the 1950 film Bōryoku no Machi

- Three Sisters With Maiden Hearts (乙女ごころ三人姉妹, Otome-gokoro sannin shimai) (1935)
- A Ball at the Anjo House (安城家の舞踏会, Anjō-ke no butōkai) (1947)
- The Bells of Nagasaki (長崎の鐘, Nagasaki no Kane) (1950)
- The Tale of Genji (1951)
- Story of a Beloved Wife (1951)
- Children of Hiroshima (1952)
- Epitome (1953)
- Rokunin no ansatsusha (1955) - Sakamoto Ryōma
- Christ in Bronze (1956)
- A Fantastic Tale of Naruto (1957)
- The Loyal 47 Ronin (忠臣蔵 Chūshingura) (1958) - Kira Yoshinaka
- Stolen Desire (盗まれた欲情, Nusumareta yokujo) (1958)
- Fires on the Plain (1959)
- Kiku to Isamu (1959)
- Love Under the Crucifix (1962)
- The Flower and the Angry Waves (花と怒濤, Hana to dotō) (1964)
- Kiri no Hata (1965)
- Taking The Castle (1965) - Naoe Kanetsugu
- Shiroi Kyotō (1966) - Professor Funao
- The Sands of Kurobe (1968)
- Tempyō no Iraka (1980)
- Rokudenashi Blues '98 (ろくでなしBLUES '98) (1998)

=== Television ===
- Akō Rōshi (1964) - Kira Yoshinaka
- Minamoto no Yoshitsune (1966) - Fujiwara no Hidehira
- San Shimai (1967) - Shinbei of the Wind
- Ryōma ga Yuku (1968) - Narrator
- Ten to Chi to (1969) - Nagao Tamekage
- Shin Heike Monogatari (1972) - Emperor Shirakawa and Emperor Go-Shirakawa

== Honours ==
- Medal with Purple Ribbon (1977)
- Order of the Sacred Treasure, 3rd class, Gold Rays with Neck Ribbon (1986)
