= Hatamoto Gurentai =

- Film poster
- Kanji: 旗本愚連隊
- Directed by: Seiichi Fukuda
- Written by: Daisuke Itō
- Produced by: Koichiro Okura
- Starring: Takahiro Tamura; Masahiko Tsugawa
- Music by: Seiichi Suzuki
- Production company: Shochiku
- Distributed by: Shochiku
- Release date: December 27, 1960 (Japan)
- Country: Japan
- Language: Japanese

Hatamoto Gurentai (Japanese: 旗本愚連隊, Hepburn: Hatamoto's Fools), also known as Samurai Desperadoes, is a 1961 Japanese jidaigeki film written by Daisuke Ito and directed by Seiichi Fukuda. Hatamoto Gurentai was adapted from the novel Okubo Hikozaemon written by Genzō Murakami. Masakazu Tamura made his acting debut in the film.

== Cast ==
- Takahiro Tamura as Imamura Samon
- Masahiko Tsugawa as Nagasaka
- Miyuki Kuwano
- Hiroshi Nawa
- Masakazu Tamura as Mori Takehichi
- Toru Yuri
- Junzaburo Ban
