= Hiroko Sakurai =

Japanese actress

- 桜井 浩子
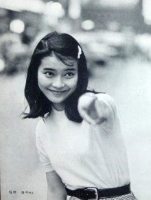
- Kinema Junpo, July 1963
- Born: 古矢 浩子 (Hiroko Furuya); March 4, 1946 (age 80); Meguro, Tokyo
- Occupations: Actress, Film Producer
- Years active: 1962-present
- Organization: Tsuburaya Productions
- Notable work: Ultra Q as Yuriko Edogawa Ultraman as Akiko Fuji Ultraman Max as Yukari Yoshinaga

Hiroko Sakurai (桜井 浩子, Sakurai Hiroko) (b. March 4, 1946 in Meguro, Tokyo, Japan.) is a Japanese actress, author and producer at Tsuburaya Productions.

== Filmography ==
=== Movie ===
Year	Title	Role	Notes	Source
1962	Kawa no hotori de	Taeko Takayama		
1963	Onna ni tsuyoku naru kufû no kazukazu	Masako, Sugishita		
1963	Eburi manshi no yûga-na seikatsu			
1963	Oneechan sandai-ki	Hanayo Takano (Ochara)		
1964	Aa bakudan			
1964	Amai ase	Tamako		
1964	Danchi: Nanatsu no taizai	Yukiko Nakamura		
1967	Taifû to zakuro	Akiko Shimamura		
1967	Bâkushoyarô daijiken	Hiromi		
1968	Kamo to negi	Yoshie		
1968	Curse of the Blood			
1968	Ultraman	Akiko Fuji		
1968	Shinjuku sodachi			
1970	Onna-rō Hizu	Osen		
1971	Mandara	Yasuko / Hirochi's wife		
1972	Uta			
1977	Utamaro: Yume to shiriseba			
1977	Furenzoku satsujin jiken	Kyoko Yashiro		
1979	Ultraman: Great Monster Decisive Battle	Akiko Fuji		
1979	Ultraman	Akiko Fuji		
1996	Revive! Ultraman	Akiko Fuji	(archive footage)	
1996-1997	Ultraman Zearth	Housewife	Part 1-2	
2001	Ultraman Cosmos: The First Contact			
2006	Ultraman Mebius & Ultraman Brothers			
2008	Superior Ultraman 8 Brothers	Akiko Fuji		
2010	Death Kappa			
2011	Hômukamingu	Noriko Sugiura		
2024	Ultraman: Rising	Ami Wakita's mother	Japanese Dub	

=== TV ===
Year	Title	Role	Notes
1966	Ultra Q	Yuriko Edogawa	
1966	Ultraman	Akiko Fuji	39 episodes
1967	Kaiju Booska		
1967	Ultra Seven		Episode 12
1967	Mighty Jack		
1972	Mirrorman		
1974	Ultraman Leo	Rolan	
1997	Shin Megami Tensei: Devil Summoner	Mary Kisaragi	
2001	Ultraman Cosmos	Clevergon	
2005	Ultraman Max	Prof. Yukari Yoshinaga	40 episodes

== Books by Sakurai ==
- A Chronicle of Ultraman’s Youth: Member Fuji’s 929 Days (ウルトラマン青春記―フジ隊員の929日, Urutoraman seishunki- Fuji taiin no 929 nichi) (1994, Shōgakukan) ISBN 4-09-387128-0
- The Genesis Of Ultraman (ウルトラマン創世記, Urutoraman sōseiki) (2003, Shōgakukan) ISBN 4-09-387464-6.
- Akiko Fujiko’s Story: Secrets Behind the Filming of Ultraman (フジアキコ物語： ウルトラマン撮影秘話。, Fuji akiko monogatari : urutoraman satsuei hiwa.) (2005, Kadokawashoten) ISBN 978-4-04-853853-4.
