= Tsugaru Folk Song =

- DVD cover
- Directed by: Kōichi Saitō
- Written by: Kōichi Saitō; Takehiro Nakajima
- Produced by: Akihiko Shimada; Shosuke Taga
- Starring: Kyoko Enami; Akira Oda; Mihoko Nakagawa; Kō Nishimura; Kojiro Hongo
- Cinematography: Noritaka Sakamoto
- Edited by: Tomoyo Ōshima
- Music by: Takahashi Chikuzan
- Production company: Art Theatre Guild
- Distributed by: Toho
- Release date: December 20, 1973 (Japan)
- Running time: 103 minutes
- Country: Japan
- Language: Japanese

Tsugaru Folk Song (Japanese: 津軽じょんがら節, Hepburn: Tsugaru Jongarabushi) is a 1973 Japanese drama film directed by Kōichi Saitō. The story is about the search for the basis of Japanese national identity, and the escape of lovers to the wonder of nature.

== Cast ==
- Kyoko Enami as Isako Nakazato
- Akira Oda as Tetsuo Iwaki
- Mihoko Nakagawa as Yuki
- Kō Nishimura as Tamezo Tsukamoto
- Kojiro Hongo
- Hideo Sato as Kanayama
- Minori Terada as Yutaka
- Haruko Toda as Waki, Yuki's grandmother

== Awards ==
50th Kinema Junpo Award

- Won: Best Film
- Won: Best Director for Kōichi Saitō
- Won: Best Actress for Kyoko Enami

28th Mainichi Film Award

- Won: Best Film
