= Atsuko Asano =

Japanese actress (born 1961)

Atsuko Asano (浅野 温子, Asano Atsuko; born March 4, 1961 in Adachi, Tokyo) is a Japanese actress. Upon marrying Tsutomu Uozumi, a reputed copywriter and lyricist in 1983, her "koseki" name (name in Japanese family registry) became Atsuko Uozumi. She gave birth to a son in 1984.

== Biography ==
She was invited by a production agency to try out for acting at the age of 15. She appeared on TV for the first time in 1976, playing minor roles in dramas. In 1977 her appearance in the drama Fumiko to Hatsu on the Tokyo Broadcasting System (TBS) is widely considered to be her debut work on TV. Movie work started early as well, notably with a leading role in Slow Boogie (1981) which brought her acclaim. In 1983, her performances in Yokiroh (The Geisha) and Yogoreta Eiyu (The Last Hero) earned her a Best Supporting Actress Award from the Japan Academy Prize.

From the mid-1980s she began to gain popularity in TV dramas. Top-rated series to follow were: Abunai Deka on Nippon Television (NTV, 1986), Papa wa Newscaster (TBS, 1987) and Dakishimetai! on Fuji Television (CX, 1988), the latter being noted as a signature trendy drama in Japanese TV and a boom to her popularity. Then The 101st Proposal (CX, 1991) was another major hit. She became an icon in Japan as a top actress, lady of natural style and fashion leader. While she impressed audiences with her elegant and "weeping" role in The 101st Proposal, her enactment of the popular cartoon character Sazae-san on TV (CX, 1992–96) showcased her talent for comedy. Then in contrast she performed a hard-edged role in the series Sashow the Last Case (CX, 1995), pointing to her skillful flexibility in acting.

She has appeared on the cover pages of numerous magazines. On the pages therein her live-wire personality has been noted to speak for a new generation of Japanese women, and for millions of fans. Among her awards a favorite is "Best Jeanist" (1989) from the Japan Jeans Association in recognition of her attractiveness while clad in jeans. Endorsement deals ensued with Menicon, Mercian, Mitsubishi Motors, Sony, Japan Airlines, Japan Tobacco, Meiji Ice Cream, GC Card, Mitsui Life Insurance, Lion Plain & Rich, Shiseido, Nissan Motors, MonCafe, Twinings, NEC, Parco, Vivre, Vital Rich, Loreal, and P&G Luminesse.

Her career entered another phase with more stage roles than before, from starring in Romantic Comedy in 1998. Stage work gave inspiration and tremendous influence to her. This gave rise to her project of performing "Yomigatari", storytelling stages with scenario based on "Kojiki" ("Record of Ancient Matters"), the oldest extant chronicle in Japan, at shrines all around Japan since 2003. Starting at the shrines Ise Grand Shrine and Izumo-taisha, by 2010 she performed her storytelling stage before over 80,000 people on 64 stages. The project is ongoing. In many interviews she commented, "There are more than 80,000 shrines in Japan. I would like to visit all of them, but to do that living to the age of 200 won't be long enough!" Her efforts in performing Kojiki-related stages earned her an appointment to the position of visiting professor at Kokugakuin University since 2008.
