= Tempyō no Iraka =

- Film poster
- Directed by: Kei Kumai
- Screenplay by: Yoshikata Yoda
- Based on: Tempyō no Iraka by Yasushi Inoue
- Produced by: Ichiro Sato; Fumio Kanahara; Isono Osamu; Masaya Endo
- Starring: Katsuo Nakamura; Masaaki Daimon; Takahiro Tamura; Mieko Takamine; Takashi Shimura
- Cinematography: Shinsaku Himeda
- Edited by: Nobuo Ogawa
- Music by: Tōru Takemitsu
- Production company: Tempyō no Iraka Production Committee
- Distributed by: Toho
- Release date: January 26, 1980 (Japan)
- Running time: 152 minutes
- Country: Japan
- Language: Japanese
- Box office: ¥1.15 billion

Tempyō no Iraka (天平の甍, Tiled Roof of the Tempyou Era), also known as An Ocean to Cross, is a 1980 Japanese historical drama film directed by Kei Kumai, based on Yasushi Inoue's novel of the same name. The film follows a Japanese mission to Tang China during the Heian period.

== Cast ==
- Katsuo Nakamura as Fushō
- Masaaki Daimon as Yōei
- Takahiro Tamura as Ganjin
- Mitsuo Hamada as Genrō
- Hisashi Igawa as Gyōgō
- Mieko Takamine as Yoroshime
- Hideko Yoshida as Koyoshi
- Daigo Kusano as Kaiyu
- Shōbun Inoue as Yoshihiko
- Yasukiyo Umeno as Kibi no Makibi
- Kōji Takahashi as Abe no Nakamaro
- Osamu Takizawa as Rōben
- Takashi Shimura as Ryuson
