= The Yoshiwara Story =

1968 film directed by Kazuo Mori

- Film poster
- Directed by: Kazuo Mori
- Screenplay by: Shozaburo Asai
- Starring: Michiyo Yasuda; Masakazu Tamura
- Music by: Hajime Kaburagi
- Distributed by: Daiei Film
- Release date: July 13, 1968 (Japan)
- Running time: 78 minutes
- Country: Japan
- Language: Japanese

The Yoshiwara Story (Japanese: 秘録おんな蔵, Hepburn: Hiroku Onnagura), also known as Secret Report from a House of Women, is a 1968 Japanese action film directed by Kazuo Mori. It stars Michiyo Yasuda. The film depicts the people of Yoshiwara from protagonist Onatsu's point of view. The Yoshiwara Story is part of the Hiroku series produced by Daiei Film.

== Plot ==
- Source: Onatsu became a prostitute in Yoshiwara to repay her father's debt. One day, Onatsu learns that her father was deceived by Ryōgokuya and forced to commit suicide.

== Cast ==
- Michiyo Yasuda as Onatsu
- Masakazu Tamura as Naojirō
- Machiko Hasegawa as Daresore Dayu
- Yuko Hamada as Sasanoi
- Hōsei Komatsu as Chōhichi
- Tōru Emori as Miyokichi
- Ichiro Sugai as Negishi no Inkyo (Ryōgokuya)

== Hiroku film series ==
- Hiroku Onna Rō (1968) directed by Akira Inoue.
- Hiroku Nagasaki Onna Rō (1968) directed by Shōwa Ota.
- Zoku Hiroku Onnagura (1968) directed by Kimiyoshi Yasuda.
- Hiroku Onna Dera (1969) directed by Tokuzō Tanaka.
