= Naruto Hichō (1977 TV series) =

- Also known as: 鳴門秘帖
- Genre: Jidaigeki
- Directed by: Takashi Kitajima; Kosei Shibuya
- Starring: Masakazu Tamura; Kyoko Mitsubayashi; Mieko Harada; Kō Nishimura
- Theme music composer: Minoru Miki
- Country of origin: Japan
- Original language: Japanese
- No. of episodes: 44

Production
- Running time: 45 minutes (per episode)
- Production company: NHK

Original release
- Network: NHK
- Release: May 6, 1977 – March 17, 1978

Naruto Hichō (鳴門秘帖) is a Japanese jidaigeki or period drama that was broadcast in prime-time in 1977 to 1978. It is based on Eiji Yoshikawa's novel Naruto Hichō. The lead star is Masakazu Tamura. Norizuki is an Oniwaban of Tokugawa Shogunate. He goes to Awa Province to investigate a conspiracy in the Tokushima Han. There was a remake broadcast in 2018.

== Cast ==
- Masakazu Tamura as Norizuki Gennojō
- Kyoko Mitsubayashi as Otsuna
- Mieko Harada as Chie
- Kō Nishimura as Yoami
- Hideo Takamatsu as Tendō Ikkaku
- Takashi Yamaguchi as Hiraga Gennai
- Asami Kobayashi as Oyone
- Takeshi Kusaka as Zeami
- Reo Morimoto as Mankichi
- Shinjirō Ehara Magobei
- Ichirō Arishima as Monji no Tora
- Takuzō Kakuno
- Kōjirō Kusanagi as Togashi
- Seiji Matsuyama as Hayashi Keinosuke
