= Onna-rō Hizu =

Decapitation Island
- Directed by: Toshiaki Kunihara
- Starring: Masakazu Tamura Maya Kitajima
- Music by: Hajime Kaburagi
- Distributed by: Daiei Film
- Release date: October 14, 1970 (Japan)
- Running time: 83 minutes
- Country: Japan
- Language: Japanese

Decapitation Island (おんな牢秘図, Onna-rō Hizu) is a 1970 Japanese erotic jidaigeki film directed by Toshiaki Kunihara. The lead star is Masakazu Tamura.

== Plot ==
The film depicts a battle between female prisoners and officials on an isolated island surrounded by cliffs. There are 11 female prisoners on the prison island, with two new prisoners arriving. Santarō Isahaya has been relegated from the position of Nagasaki’s governor to the island’s administrator due to a scandal.

== Cast ==
- Masakazu Tamura as Santarō Isahaya
- Maya Kitajima as Okiyo
- Reiko Kasahara as Oran
- Hiroko Sakurai as Osen
- Keiko Koyanagi as Oseki
- Gen Kimura
- Hiroshi Kondo as Kangoro
- Kazuo Kato as Segoshi
