= Kawaite sōrō =

- Also known as: 乾いて候
- Genre: Jidaigeki
- Based on: Kawaite sōrō by: Goseki Kojima; Kazuo Koike
- Directed by: Yuichi Harada
- Starring: Masakazu Tamura; Takahiro Tamura; Ryo Tamura; Kie Nakai
- Country of origin: Japan
- Original language: Japanese
- No. of episodes: 6

Production
- Running time: 45 minutes (per episode)
- Production company: Toei

Original release
- Network: Fuji Television
- Release: August 23 – September 27, 1984

Kawaite sōrō (乾いて候) is a Japanese jidaigeki or period drama that was broadcast in prime-time in 1984. It is also known as "A Samurai's Sorrow." It is based on Goseki Kojima and Kazuo Koike's manga of the same title. The lead star is Masakazu Tamura. Masakazu Tamura's elder brother Takahiro Tamura and younger brother Ryo Tamura also appeared. Three special editions of the drama were produced. Masakazu Tamura played the role on stage.

== Plot ==
Kainage Mondo is a secret child of Tokugawa Yoshimune and is a skilled swordsman. His job is a part to test food for poison for Yoshimune. He was on a journey but he goes to Edo to see Yoshimune.

The Owari han have longed for the post of shogun and try to murder Yoshimune, in order to get shogun's post. Fuki is a kunoichi of Kōka. She tries to murder Yoshimue but she comes to like Mondo and eventually starts working for Mondo and Yoshimune. Mondo protects Yoshimune's life from Owari han and other enemies.

== Cast ==
- Masakazu Tamura as Kainage Mondo
- Takahiro Tamura as Tokugawa Yoshimune
- Ryo Tamura as Ōoka Tadasuke
- Tsutomu Isobe as Tokugawa Muneharu
- Kantarō Suga as Manabe Akifusa
- Junshi Shimada as Mizuno Izuminokami
- Junkichi Orimoto
- Goichi Yamada
- Yōsuke Kondō as Head of Owari Yagyū
- Kie Nakai as Fuki (Fukiko)

== Episode list ==
Episode	Title	Directed by	Guest starrings
1	"Odokumiyaku sanjō!" (お毒味役参上!)	Yuichi Harada	Sei Hiraizumi, Renji Ishibashi
2	"Yōka Gekkōin shimatsu" (妖花・月光院始末)	Yuichi Harada	Kyoko Enami
3	"Tokugawa anatsuki" (徳川暗殺記)	Shizuo Okamoto	Akio Hasegawa, Minori Terada, Yōsuke Kondō
4	"Jonan hitogiritabi" (女難人斬り旅)	Shizuo Okamoto	Jumkichi Orimoto
5	"Tenichibō giwaku no ketsumyaku" (天一坊・疑惑の血脈)	Yuichi Harada	Shūko Honami, Shinjirō Ehara
6	"Odokumiyaku saigono kake" (お毒味役最後の賭け)	Yuichi Harada	Tsutomu Isobe, Shunsuke Kariya, Gorō Mutsumi

== TV Specials ==
- Odokumiyaku Shushou Kawaite sōrō (June 17, 1983) Directed by Yuichi Harada, Guest starrings, Kimie Shingyoji, Jih Nakayama
- Kawaite sōrō Odokumiyaku Hissatsuken (January 26, 1984) Directed by Yuichi Harada, Guest starrings, Tatsuo Umemiya, Kantarō Suga, Jin Nakayama
- Kawaite sōrō Hahawa Ikiteita? (April 7, 1993) Directed by Akira Inoue, Guest starrings, Kaoru Yachigusa, Kimiko Ikegami, Hirotaro Honda, Hiroyuki Nagato

== On the Stage ==
- Kawaite sōrō (乾いて候)（1987-1993）
- Shin Kawaite sōrō Sonatamo Onaji Nonohanaka (新・乾いて候 そなたもおなじ野の花か)（2003, 2005）
