= Gakusei Shinjū =

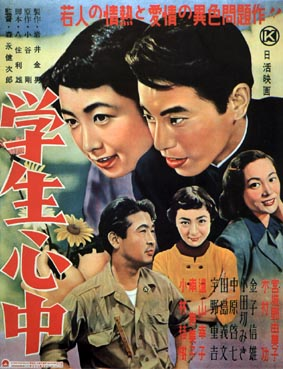
- Japanese movie poster
- Directed by: Kenjirō Morinaga
- Produced by: Nikkatsu
- Release date: July 27, 1954
- Country: Japan
- Language: Japanese

Gakusei Shinjū (学生心中), lit. Student Double Suicide a.k.a. Student Lover's Suicide, is a 1954 black-and-white Japanese film directed by Kenjirō Morinaga.

== Cast ==
- Isao Kimura
- Yumiko Miyagino
- Keishichi Nakahara (中原啓七)
- Junkichi Orimoto
- Yoshifumi Tajima
- Nobuo Kawakami (河上信夫)
- Keiju Kobayashi
- Jukichi Uno
- Sachiko Tōyama (遠山幸子)
- Keiji Itami (伊丹慶治)
- Akiko Kōno (高野明子)
- Kahoru Yamamoto (山本かほる)
- Nobuo Kaneko
- Sumiko Minami (南寿美子)
- Emiko Yanagi (柳恵美子)
- Miki Odagiri
- Yoichiro Mikawa
- Minako Gomi (五味三奈子)
- Chieko Yamashita (山下千枝子)
- Reiko Kita (北玲子)
- Nobuteru Hanamura (花村信輝)
- Zenji Yamada (山田禅二)
- Tagayasu Kihara (紀原耕)
- Miki Ejima (絵島美紀)
- Reiko Kuba (久場礼子)
