= Higashi Shinakai =

1968 film directed by Yasuzo Masumura

East China Sea
- Film poster
- Directed by: Tadahiki Isomi
- Screenplay by: Shōhei Imamura
- Produced by: Shōhei Imamura
- Starring: Masakazu Tamura; Tetsuya Watari; Ryohei Uchida; Kanjūrō Arashi; Haruko Kato
- Cinematography: Shinsaku Himeda
- Music by: Hajime Kaburagi
- Distributed by: Nikkatsu
- Release dates: October 5, 1968 (Japan); April 1969 (United States)
- Running time: 105 minutes
- Country: Japan
- Language: Japanese

Higashi Shinakai (Japanese: 東シナ海), also known as East China Sea, is a 1968 Japanese action film directed by Tadahiki Isomi.

The film was produced by Shouhei Imamura. He was also in charge of the screenplay. The lead star is Masakazu Tamura.

== Synopsis ==
Chiba Rokurō starts a part-time job on a fishing boat. But the ship has an engine failure in the middle of the Pacific Ocean, the ship manages to arrive at Naha Port in Okinawa.

== Cast ==
- Masakazu Tamura as Chiba Rokurō
- Tetsuya Watari as Tamashiro Naoyoshi
- Ryōhei Uchida as Katayama Kunigorō
- Kanjūrō Arashi as Old Guy
- Haruko Kato as Rokurō's mother
- Yukie Kagawa as Tamaki Kana
- Hitoshi Omae as Kamata Yasuo
- Taiji Tonoyama
