= Tabi no Omosa =

- Blu-ray disc cover
- Directed by: Kōichi Saitō
- Screenplay by: Fumio Ishimori
- Based on: Tabi no Omosa by Kukiko Moto
- Produced by: Tsutomu Kamimura
- Starring: Kumiko Akiyoshi; Yoko Takahashi (ja)
- Cinematography: Noritaka Sakamoto
- Edited by: Yoshiyasu Hamamura
- Music by: Takuro Yoshida
- Distributed by: Shochiku
- Release date: October 28, 1972 (Japan)
- Running time: 90 minutes
- Country: Japan
- Language: Japanese

Tabi no Omosa (Japanese: 旅の重さ), also known as Journey into Solitude in English, is a 1972 Japanese film directed by Kōichi Saitō. The story is about a 16-year-old girl who is unsatisfied with her life and leaves her home in search of something else.

== Cast ==
- Kumiko Akiyoshi
- Etsushi Takahashi as Daizo Kimura
