= Tsutomu Isobe =

Japanese actor and voice actor

- 磯部 勉
- Born: October 13, 1950 (age 75); Tokyo, Japan
- Education: Toho Gakuen College of Drama and Music
- Occupations: Actor; voice actor
- Years active: 1970–present
- Agent: Empathy
- Spouse: Miyuki Saitō
- Children: 1

Tsutomu Isobe (磯部 勉, Isobe Tsutomu; born October 13, 1950) is a Japanese actor and voice actor from Tokyo, Japan. He is the best known dubbing roles for Mel Gibson, Harrison Ford, Chow Yun-fat, Peter Weller, Tim Allen, Sean Bean, Choi Min-sik, Stringfellow Hawke (Airwolf) and many more. His daughter is actress Rinako Isobe (磯部 莉菜子, Isobe Rinako) and he is married to Miyuki Saitō (斉藤 深雪, Saitō Miyuki), an actress employed by Haiyuza Theatre Company.

== Biography ==
After graduating from junior college, Isobe joined the Haiyuza Theatre Company in 1972, where he gained experience on stage under director Koreya Senda, mainly in Shakespeare's plays, which were well received. Later, he played the role of Shishiōin, the nemesis of the main character, Kirigakure Saizō, in NHK's drama Fūjin no Mon. Since then, he has played roles in many stage, television, animation, and film productions in both period and contemporary dramas, and left Haiyuza in 1989.

Kramer vs. Kramer was his debut as a voice actor, and he was the main voice of Stringfellow Hawke, the protagonist of Airwolf, as well as Mel Gibson, Harrison Ford, Chow Yun-fat, Tim Allen, Peter Weller, Bruce Willis, and Sean Bean.

Known for his humble and sincere personality, it is said that when Isobe took on the role of Charlton Heston in The Ten Commandments, he called Gorō Naya, who dubbed Heston for many years, directly to ask for his forgiveness, when in fact Isobe met Naya in a bar and greeted him. He originally dubbed Heston when he filled in for Naya in the Friday first-run showing of The Naked Jungle, and has since served in three new recordings.

In 2005's Mahō Sentai Magiranger, he was cast as the voice of the enemy leader Wolzard as well as Wolzard's true identity, the Magiranger, father Isamu Ozu. This was the first time for him to be a regular in a tokusatsu series, so when he was offered to play the role of Isamu Ozu unmasked, he was at first puzzled as to whether it was right for him. In the final episode, like the rest of the cast, he is in the suit of Wolzard Fire, the transformed version of his role.

== Filmography ==
=== Film ===
- The Incident (1978)
- August Without the Emperor (1978)
- Lost in the Wilderness (1986)
- Yuwakusha (1989), Hiraide
- Dōten (1991)
- Yūkai (1997)

=== Television drama ===
- Mito Kōmon (1975–2011)
- Genroku Taiheiki (1975), Mōri Koheita
- Shishi no Jidai (1980)
- Tōge no Gunzō (1982), Horibe Yasubee
- Kawaite sōrō (1984)
- Shadow Warriors IV (1985), Samonji Noro
- Inochi (1986)
- Kasuga no Tsubone (1989), Akechi Hidemitsu
- Onihei Hankachō (1989–1997), Ninzaburo, Katsunosuke and Daigaku Yokota
- Ōoka Echizen (1990), Bunkichi
- Tobu ga Gotoku (1990), Matsudaira Shungaku
- Hachidai Shōgun Yoshimune (1995)
- Mōri Motonari (1997), Uyama Hisakane
- Genroku Ryōran (1999), Toda Ujisada
- Aoi (2000), Ikeda Terumasa
- Musashi (2003)
- AIBOU: Tokyo Detective Duo (2008), Nakamura
- Atsuhime (2008), Kujo Hisatada
- Gunshi Kanbei (2014), Ogō Yoshitoshi
- Daddy Sister (2016)
- The Tiger and Her Wings (2024), Rikitaro Nishikida

=== Television animation ===
- Gungrave (2003), Harry MacDowel
- Monster (2004), Inspector Lunge
- Tsubasa: Reservoir Chronicle (2006), Kurogane's father
- Black Lagoon (2006), Dutch
- One Outs (2008), Hiromichi Kojima
- Blade (2010), Deacon Frost
- Jormungand (2012), George Black
- Magic Kaito 1412 (2014), Tsūjirō Hasura
- Subete ga F ni Naru (2015), Shōsuke Nishinosono
- The Kindaichi Case Files R (2016), Susumu Samejima

=== Original net animation ===
- Thermae Romae Novae (2022), Emperor Hadrian

=== Theatrical animation ===
- Memories (1995), Heinz
- Cowboy Bebop: The Movie (2001), Vincent Volaju
- Naruto the Movie: Snow Princess' Book of Ninja Arts (2004), Dotō Kazehana
- JoJo's Bizarre Adventure: Phantom Blood (2007), George Joestar
- Trigun: Badlands Rumble (2010), Gasback Gallon Getaway
- King of Thorn (2010), Ivan Coral Vega
- Mobile Suit Gundam 00 the Movie: A Wakening of the Trailblazer (2010), Aeolia Schenberg
- Mardock Scramble (2010), Dimsdale Boiled
- Gintama: The Movie: The Final Chapter: Be Forever Yorozuya (2013), Emmi
- Kingsglaive: Final Fantasy XV (2016), Regis Lucis Caelum CXIII
- Psycho-Pass: Sinners of the System (2019), Guillermo Garcia
- One Piece: Stampede (2019), Douglas Bullet

=== Video games ===
- Gungrave (2000), Harry MacDowel
- Street Fighter X Tekken (2012), Bob
- Tales of Xillia 2 (2012), Bisley Karcsi Bakur
- Kingdom Hearts 3D: Dream Drop Distance (2012), Kevin Flynn, Clu
- Granblue Fantasy (2015), Friar Laurence / Iago
- Final Fantasy XV (2016), Regis Lucis Caelum CXIII
- Nioh 2 (2020), Shibata Katsuie
- Ghost of Tsushima (2020), Khotun Khan

=== Tokusatsu ===
- Mahou Sentai Magiranger (2005), Wolzard (voice), Blagel (voice), Isamu Ozu
- Gokaiger Goseiger Super Sentai 199 Hero Great Battle (2011), Wolzard (voice), Blagel (voice), Isamu Ozu
- Kamen Rider Fourze the Movie: Everyone, Space Is Here! (2012), XVII (voice)
- Uchu Sentai Kyuranger: Episode of Stinger (2017) Thunderbird (voice)
- Bakuage Sentai Boonboomger (2024) Grantu Risk (voice)

=== Radio drama ===
- Mademoiselle Mozart (1992), Antonio Salieri

=== Dubbing roles ===
==== Live-action ====
- Harrison Ford
  - Star Wars Episode IV: A New Hope (Han Solo)
  - The Empire Strikes Back (Han Solo)
  - Blade Runner (2011 THE CINEMA edition) (Rick Deckard)
  - Return of the Jedi (Han Solo)
  - Indiana Jones and the Temple of Doom (1998 TV Asahi edition) (Indiana Jones)
  - Witness (1990 TV Asahi edition) (Detective John Book)
  - Frantic (Dr. Richard Walker)
  - Working Girl (1991 TV Asahi edition) (Jack Trainer)
  - Indiana Jones and the Last Crusade (1998 TV Asahi edition) (Indiana Jones)
  - Presumed Innocent (1995 TV Asahi edition) (Rozat "Rusty" Sabich)
  - Patriot Games (Jack Ryan)
  - The Fugitive (Doctor Richard Kimble)
  - Clear and Present Danger (1997 TV Asahi edition) (Jack Ryan)
  - The Devil's Own (Tom O'Meara)
  - Six Days Seven Nights (Quinn Harris)
  - Random Hearts (Sergeant William 'Dutch' Van Den Broeck)
  - What Lies Beneath (Dr. Norman Spencer)
  - K-19: The Widowmaker (Alexei Vostrikov)
  - Hollywood Homicide (Sergeant Joe Gavilan)
  - Firewall (Jack Stanfield)
  - Extraordinary Measures (Dr. Robert Stonehill)
  - Morning Glory (Mike Pomeroy)
  - Cowboys & Aliens (Colonel Dolarhyde)
  - Ender's Game (Colonel Graff)
  - Star Wars: The Force Awakens (Han Solo)
  - Blade Runner 2049 (Rick Deckard)
  - The Call of the Wild (John Thornton)
- Mel Gibson
  - Lethal Weapon (1997 TV Asahi edition) (Martin Riggs)
  - Lethal Weapon 2 (1993 TV Asahi edition) (Martin Riggs)
  - Air America (1992 NTV edition) (Gene Ryack)
  - Lethal Weapon 3 (1995 TV Asahi edition) (Martin Riggs)
  - The Man Without a Face (Justin McLeod)
  - Ransom (Original and TV Asahi edition) (Tom Mullen)
  - Lethal Weapon 4 (2003 TV Asahi edition) (Martin Riggs)
  - Payback (Porter)
  - The Patriot (2003 TV Tokyo edition) (Benjamin Martin)
  - What Women Want (2003 NTV edition) (Nick Marshall)
  - Signs (Graham Hess)
  - We Were Soldiers (Lieutenant Colonel Hal Moore)
  - Get the Gringo (Driver)
  - The Expendables 3 (Conrad Stonebanks)
  - Blood Father (John Link)
  - Dragged Across Concrete (Brett Ridgeman)
  - The Professor and the Madman (James Murray)
  - Fatman (Chris Cringle)
  - The Continental: From the World of John Wick (Cormac)
- Chow Yun-fat
  - A Better Tomorrow (2013 Blu-ray and DVD editions) (Mark Lee)
  - The Seventh Curse (Wei / Wesley)
  - A Better Tomorrow II (2013 Blu-ray and DVD editions) (Ken "Gor" Lee)
  - The Eighth Happiness ('Handsome' Long)
  - Fractured Follies (Joe)
  - A Better Tomorrow III: Love & Death in Saigon (Mark Gor)
  - The Killer (Ah Jong)
  - The Fun, the Luck & the Tycoon (Lam Bo Sang / Stink)
  - God of Gamblers II (Ko Chun / God of Gamblers)
  - Once a Thief (Red Bean Pudding)
  - Full Contact (Gou Fei)
  - Treasure Hunt (Jeffrey Cheung Ching)
  - Peace Hotel (The Killer)
  - The Corruptor (Lieutenant Nicholas "Nick" Chen)
  - Bulletproof Monk (2008 TV Tokyo edition) (The Nameless Monk)
  - Pirates of the Caribbean: At World's End (Sao Feng)
  - Dragonball Evolution (Master Roshi)
  - Shanghai (Anthony Lan-Ting)
  - The Monkey King (The Jade Emperor)
  - From Vegas to Macau (Ken)
- Bruce Willis
  - The Last Boy Scout (1996 NTV edition) (Captain Marcus Rich)
  - The Jackal (The Jackal)
  - The Siege (Major General William Devereaux)
  - Disney's The Kid (Russel Dritz)
  - Friends (Paul Stevens)
  - Unbreakable (David Dunn)
  - The Whole Nine Yards (Jimmy "The Tulip" Tudeski)
  - The Whole Ten Yards (Captain Marcus Rich)
  - Red (Francis "Frank" Moses)
  - Red 2 (Francis "Frank" Moses)
  - Glass (David Dunn)
- Choi Min-sik
  - Shiri (Park Mu-young)
  - Oldboy (Oh Dae-su)
  - Springtime (Hyeon-woo)
  - Crying Fist (Kang Tae-shik)
  - Sympathy for Lady Vengeance (Mister Baek)
  - I Saw the Devil (Jang Kyung-chul)
  - The Admiral: Roaring Currents (Yi Sun-sin)
- George Clooney
  - Ocean's Eleven (2005 Fuji TV edition) (Danny Ocean)
  - Ocean's Twelve (2007 NTV edition) (Danny Ocean)
  - Ocean's Thirteen (2010 Fuji TV edition) (Danny Ocean)
  - The Descendants (Matthew "Matt" King)
  - Tomorrowland (Frank Walker)
- Sean Bean
  - GoldenEye (1999 TV Asahi edition) (Alec Trevelyan)
  - National Treasure (Ian Howe)
  - Flightplan (Captain Marcus Rich)
  - The Martian (Mitch Henderson)
  - Knights of the Zodiac (Alman Kiddo)
- Hugh Jackman
  - X-Men (2003 TV Asahi edition) (Wolverine)
  - X2 (2006 TV Asahi edition) (Wolverine)
  - X-Men: The Last Stand (2009 TV Asahi edition) (Wolverine)
- Tim Allen
  - The Santa Clause (Scott Calvin)
  - Big Trouble (Eliot Arnold)
  - El Camino Christmas (Larry Michael Roth)
- Jeff Bridges
  - Seabiscuit (Charles S. Howard)
  - Tron: Legacy (Kevin Flynn, Clu)
  - Tron: Ares (Kevin Flynn)
- Bad Santa (Willie T. Soke (Billy Bob Thornton))
- Ben-Hur (2000 TV Tokyo edition) (Judah Ben-Hur (Charlton Heston))
- Body of Lies (Ed Hoffman (Russell Crowe))
- Bram Stoker's Dracula (1995 TV Asahi edition) (Count Dracula (Gary Oldman))
- Cape Fear (1995 TV Asahi edition) (Max Cady (Robert De Niro))
- Cat People (1992 TV Asahi edition) (Paul Gallier (Malcolm McDowell))
- Chicago Med (Dr. Daniel Charles (Oliver Platt))
- Digger (Compson (John Goodman))
- Face/Off (TV Asahi 2002 and 2004 edition) (Sean Archer (John Travolta))
- The Fifth Element (2002 TV Asahi edition) (Jean-Baptiste Emanuel Zorg (Gary Oldman))
- Flight of the Phoenix (Captain Franklin Towns (Dennis Quaid))
- From the Earth to the Moon (Neil Armstrong (Tony Goldwyn))
- The Getaway (Carter "Doc" McCoy (Steve McQueen))
- The Gift (David Duncan (Gary Cole))
- The Golden Compass (Ragnar Sturlusson (Ian McShane))
- The Highwaymen (Frank Hamer (Kevin Costner))
- Initial D (Bunta Fujiwara (Anthony Wong))
- Iron Man 2 (2012 TV Asahi edition) (Ivan Vanko / Whiplash (Mickey Rourke))
- Kiss of the Dragon (Inspector Jean-Pierre Richard (Tchéky Karyo))
- Kramer vs. Kramer (Ted Kramer (Dustin Hoffman))
- Lawrence of Arabia (2000 TV Tokyo edition) (Sherif Ali (Omar Sharif))
- Lethal Weapon (Roger Murtaugh (Damon Wayans))
- Men in Black: International (High T (Liam Neeson))
- Pearl Harbor (Major Jimmy Doolittle (Alec Baldwin))
- Proof of Life (Terry Thorne (Russell Crowe))
- Red Cliff (Cao Cao (Zhang Fengyi))
- RoboCop (1990 TV Asahi edition) (Alex J. Murphy/RoboCop (Peter Weller))
- RoboCop 2 (1993 TV Asahi edition) (Alex J. Murphy/RoboCop (Peter Weller))
- Runaway Bride (Homer Eisenhower Graham (Richard Gere))
- The Saint (Simon Templar (Val Kilmer))
- Scarface (1991 TV Tokyo edition) (Tony Montana (Al Pacino))
- Screamers (Commander Joseph A. Hendricksson (Peter Weller))
- Seinfeld (Cosmo Kramer)
- Seven (1999 TV Tokyo edition) (John Doe (Kevin Spacey))
- Showtime (Detective Mitch Preston (Robert De Niro))
- Sudden Death (1999 TV Asahi edition) (Joshua Foss (Powers Boothe))
- The Ten Commandments (2002 TV Asahi edition) (Moses (Charlton Heston))
- Top Gun (2005 NTV edition) (CDR Mike "Viper" Metcalf (Tom Skerritt))
- Transformers: Age of Extinction (Lockdown)
- XXX (Yorgi (Marton Csokas))

==== Animation ====
- Final Fantasy: The Spirits Within (General Hein)
- The Garfield Movie (Otto)
- Happy Feet Two (Bryan the Beach Master)
- Luca (Lorenzo Paguro)
