= Uchi no Ko ni Kagitte... =

- Genre: Drama
- Starring: Masakazu Tamura; Aiko Morishita; George Tokoro; Reiko Nakamura; Nobuko Miyamoto; Kin Sugai
- Country of origin: Japan
- Original language: Japanese
- No. of seasons: 2
- No. of episodes: 20 (7+13)

Original release
- Network: TBS
- Release: August 17, 1984 – July 26, 1985

Uchi no Ko ni Kagitte... (うちの子にかぎって…) is a Japanese television drama series that first aired on TBS in 1984 and 1985.

Toru Ishibashi becomes a fifth grade homeroom teacher of Class 5–3 at Kichijoji Honcho elementary school, where the students of his classroom always cause trouble and mayhems.

== Cast ==
- Masakazu Tamura as Toru Ishibashi
- Aiko Morishita as Ryoko Ishibashi
- George Tokoro as Chutaro Kosaka
- Reiko Nakamura as Nakano
- Nobuko Miyamoto as Ikeda
- Akio Hayashi as Goro Masuda
- Kin Sugai as Aramaki
