= Junkichi Orimoto =

Japanese actor and seiyū (1927–2019)

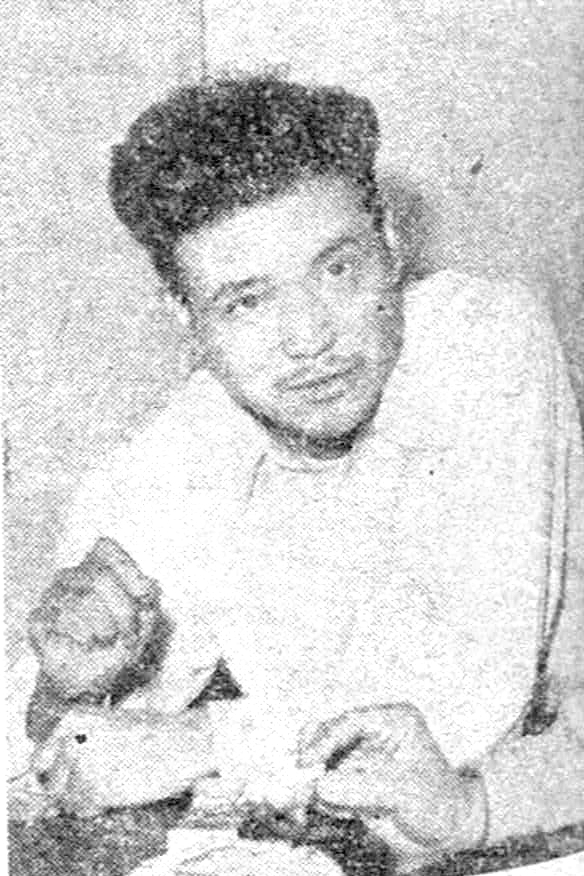
- Orimoto in 1954
- Born: 9 February 1927; Yokohama, Kanagawa Prefecture, Japan
- Died: 18 March 2019 (aged 92)
- Occupation: Actor
- Years active: 1949–2018

Junkichi Orimoto (織本 順吉, Orimoto Junkichi; 9 February 1927 – 18 March 2019) was a Japanese actor. Orimoto often worked with Kinji Fukasaku and Sadao Nakajima.

He started his acting career at the Shinkyō theatre company in 1949. His first film appearance was in the 1952 film Yamabiko Gakkō directed by Tadashi Imai. In 2019, he died of old age at the age of 92. His final film appearance was in the 2018 film blank13.

== Filmography ==
=== Films ===
- Yamabiko Gakkō (1952)
- Gakusei Shinjū (1954)
- The Eternal Breasts (1955) as Shigeru Anzai
- Mahiru no ankoku (1956) as Sugita
- Jun'ai Monogatari (1956) as Detective
- The Rice People (1957) as Fisherman
- Planet Prince (1958) as Colonel Matsuda
- Three Outlaw Samurai (1958) as Kurahashi
- The Human condition Part1 (1959) as Sai
- Gang vs. G-Men (1962) as Yuichi Noguchi
- Assassination (1964) as Kamo Serizawa
- Revenge (1964)
- Kwaidan (1965)
- Live Today, Die Tomorrow! (1970) as Owner of rice store
- Tora-san's Forget Me Not (1973) as Kurihara
- Battles Without Honor and Humanity: Final Episode (1974) as Hayakawa Hideo
- Karafuto 1945 Summer Hyosetsu no Mon (1974) as Kanzaki Yuichi
- New Battles Without Honor and Humanity: The Boss's Head (1975) as Izeki Seiiji
- New Battles Without Honor and Humanity: Last Days of the Boss (1976) as Motoyama Takao
- Yakuza Graveyard (1976) as Hatano Takeshi
- The Life of Chikuzan (1977)
- Hokuriku Proxy War (1977) as Yanaka
- New Female Convict Scorpion Special: Block X (1977) as Katō
- Message from Space (1977) as Kido
- The Fall of Ako Castle (1978) as Izeki Tokubei
- Nihon no Fixer (1979) as Tsunoma
- No More Easy Life (1979)
- Sōchō no Kubi (1979) as Tamai Shuzō
- Imperial Navy (1981) as Obayashi
- Willful Murder (1981)
- Station (1981) as Chief
- The Go Masters (1982)
- The Return of Godzilla (1984) as JSDF Chief of Staff Mōri
- Mishima: A Life in Four Chapters (1985) as General Kanetoshi Mashita
- Hissatsu! III Ura ka Omote ka (1985) as Kanō Heima
- Yuwakusha (1989)
- Rikyū (1989) as Imai Sōkyū
- Lone Wolf and Cub: Final Conflict (1992) as Ishiguro
- Tsuribaka Nisshi 6 (1993)
- The 8-Tomb Village (1996) as Igawa
- New Battles Without Honor and Humanity (2000) as Mizoguchi Takeo
- Sennen no Koi Story of Genji (2001) as Kakuzen
- Kaidan Shin Mimibukuro: Yūrei Mansion (2005) as Kōan
- Be a Man! Samurai School (2008) as Kurosuki no Kokaku
- Kizumomo (2008) as Yumiya Miki
- Watashi wa Kai ni Naritai (2008) as Matsuda
- Shodo Girls (2010) as Tomoya's grandfather
- Hayabusa: Harukanaru Kikan (2012)
- The Mole Song: Undercover Agent Reiji (2014) as Sakuno Yahei
- 0.5 mm (2014) as Shōzō Kataoka
- blank13 (2018)

=== Television drama ===
- Daichūshingura (1971) as Nagasawa Tenzen
- Kogarashi Monjirō (1973) (ep.11)
- Nemuri Kyōshirō (1973) (ep.23)
- Hissatsu Shiokiya Kagyō (1975) (ep.8) as Yamazaki Kakunoshin
- Tokyo Megure Keishi (1978)
- Hissatsu Shigotonin (1980) (ep.48) as Tsuchida
- Yokugawa Ieyasu (1983) as Ōkubo Tadayo
- Kawaite sōrō (1984)
- Kinpachi-sensei (1985–87) as Honda / (1999-2000) as Onishi
- Taiyō ni Hoero! (1985) (ep.650) as Lawyer Ushijima
- Hissatsu Shigotonin Gekitotsu (1991) (ep.2) as Okubo Hikojiro
- Taiheiki (1991) as Shioya Muneharu
- Hana no Ran (1994) as Zenami
- Hideyoshi (1996) as Sakuma Nobumori
- Saka no Ue no Kumo (2010) as Hasegawa Sokichi
- Yasuragi no Sato (2017) as Kanō Eikichi

=== Dubbing ===
- Battle of the Commandos (1975 NTV edition) (Col. Charley MacPherson (Jack Palance))
