= Kōichi Saitō (film director) =

Japanese film director and photographer (1929–2009)

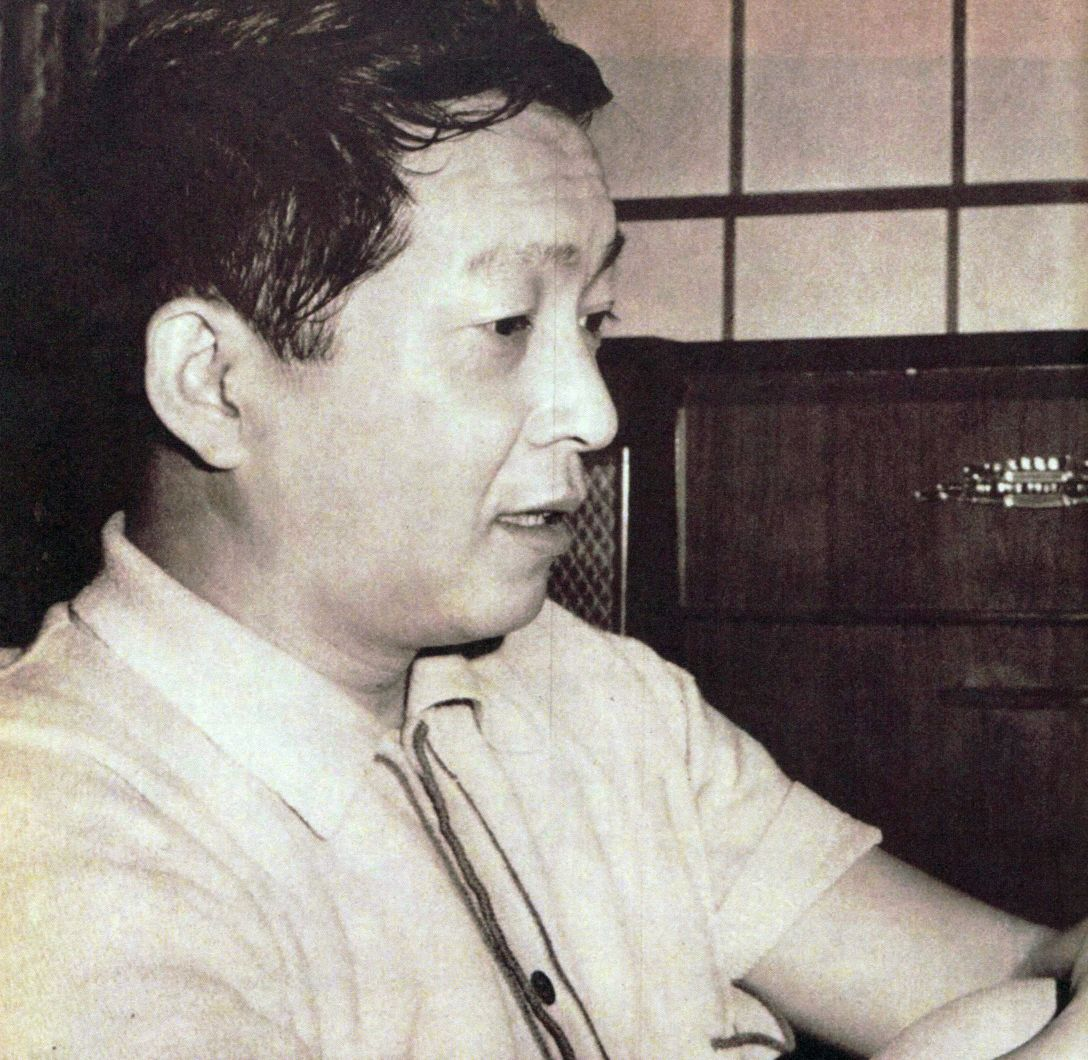
- Born: 3 February 1929; Tokyo
- Died: 28 November 2009 (aged 80)
- Occupations: Film director, photographer

Kōichi Saitō (斎藤 耕一, Saitō Kōichi; 3 February 1929 – 28 November 2009) was a Japanese film director and photographer.

== Career ==
Born in Tokyo, Saitō started studying at Rikkyo University but ended up graduating from the Tokyo College of Photography (currently Tokyo Polytechnic University). He was initially a movie stills photographer at Nikkatsu before launching his own production company, Saito Productions, and directing his first film, Sasayaki no Jō, "a low-budget, independent film with a visual flair that earned comparisons with Claude Lelouch and with Richard Lester’s Beatles films, including A Hard Day’s Night". Some of his first films were youth movies featuring Group Sounds music. He came to prominence in the early 1970s with a series of movies about young people escaping to or searching for their identity in the countryside. He won the best director award at the 1972 Mainichi Film Awards. His Tsugaru Jongarabushi was selected the best film of 1973 in the Kinema Junpo poll of critics. Saitō continued directing into his seventies and also made some documentaries. He was awarded the Order of the Rising Sun (4th Class, Gold Rays with Rosette) in 2000.

== Selected filmography ==
- Sasayaki no Jō (1967)
- Chiisana sunakku (1968)
- Yakusoku (1972; The Rendezvous)
- Tabi no omosa (1972)
- Tsugaru jongarabushi (1973; Tsugaru Folk Song)
- Yadonashi (1974; The Homeless)
