= Akō Rōshi (1964 TV series) =

- Genre: Taiga drama
- Written by: Genzō Murakami
- Directed by: Makoto Ohara etc
- Starring: Kazuo Hasegawa; Shinsuke Ashida; Chikage Awashima; Takahiro Tamura; Jukichi Uno; Katsuo Nakamura; Takashi Shimura; Yoichi Hayashi; Jun Tazaki; Masakazu Tamura; Kanjūrō Arashi; Osamu Takizawa; Isuzu Yamada
- Narrated by: Saburō Takeuchi
- Theme music composer: Yasushi Akutagawa
- Opening theme: NHK Symphony Orchestra
- Country of origin: Japan
- Original language: Japanese
- No. of episodes: 52

Production
- Running time: 45 minutes

Original release
- Network: NHK
- Release: January 5 – December 27, 1964

Related
- Akō Rōshi (1961 film)

Akō Rōshi (赤穂浪士) is a 1964 Japanese television series. It is the 2nd NHK taiga drama.

The viewership rating was well over 30%, and the episode where the raid was broadcast had a viewership rating of 53.0%. It also set the record for the highest viewership rating in the history of taiga dramas. This record has not yet been broken as of 2021. The average audience rating for all episodes is 31.9%, making it the 4th of all-time (as of 2019).

A scene from episode 7 and the full footage of episode 47 still remain today, the latter of which garnered the highest viewership rating.

== Story ==
Akō Rōshi deals with the Edo period. Based on Jirō Osaragi's novels of the same title.

It depicts the stories of the Forty-seven rōnin with Ōishi Kuranosuke as the main lead.

== Cast ==
- Kazuo Hasegawa as Ōishi Kuranosuke
- Shinsuke Ashida as Kobayashi Heihichi
- Chikage Awashima as Osen
- Takahiro Tamura as Takada Gunbei
- Masakazu Tamura
- Jukichi Uno
- Katsuo Nakamura as Ōishi Chikara
- Takashi Shimura as Onodera Junai
- Yoichi Hayashi as Hotta Yayato
- Kyoko Kishida as Aguri
- Kei Taguchi as Kayano Wasuke
- Kazuo Funaki as Yatō Emoshichi
- Takuya Fujioka as Ōishi Sezaemon
- Ichiro Sugai as Ono Kurobei
- Rokkō Toura as Takebayashi Takashige
- Masato Yamanouchi as Uesugi Tsunanori
- Morita Kan'ya XIV as Tokugawa Tsunayoshi
- Jun Tazaki
- Junzaburō Ban as Maruoka Bokuan
- Akira Kume as Wakizaka Awaji no Kami
- Fubuki Koshiji as Ukiyo daou
- Kō Nishimura as Aizawa Shinbei
- Ryūtarō Ōtomo as Horiuchi
- Kanjūrō Arashi as Hosokawa Echu no Kami
- Osamu Takizawa as Kira Kōzuke no suke
- Isuzu Yamada as Ōishi Riku
