= Seiji Miyaguchi =

Japanese actor (1913–1985)

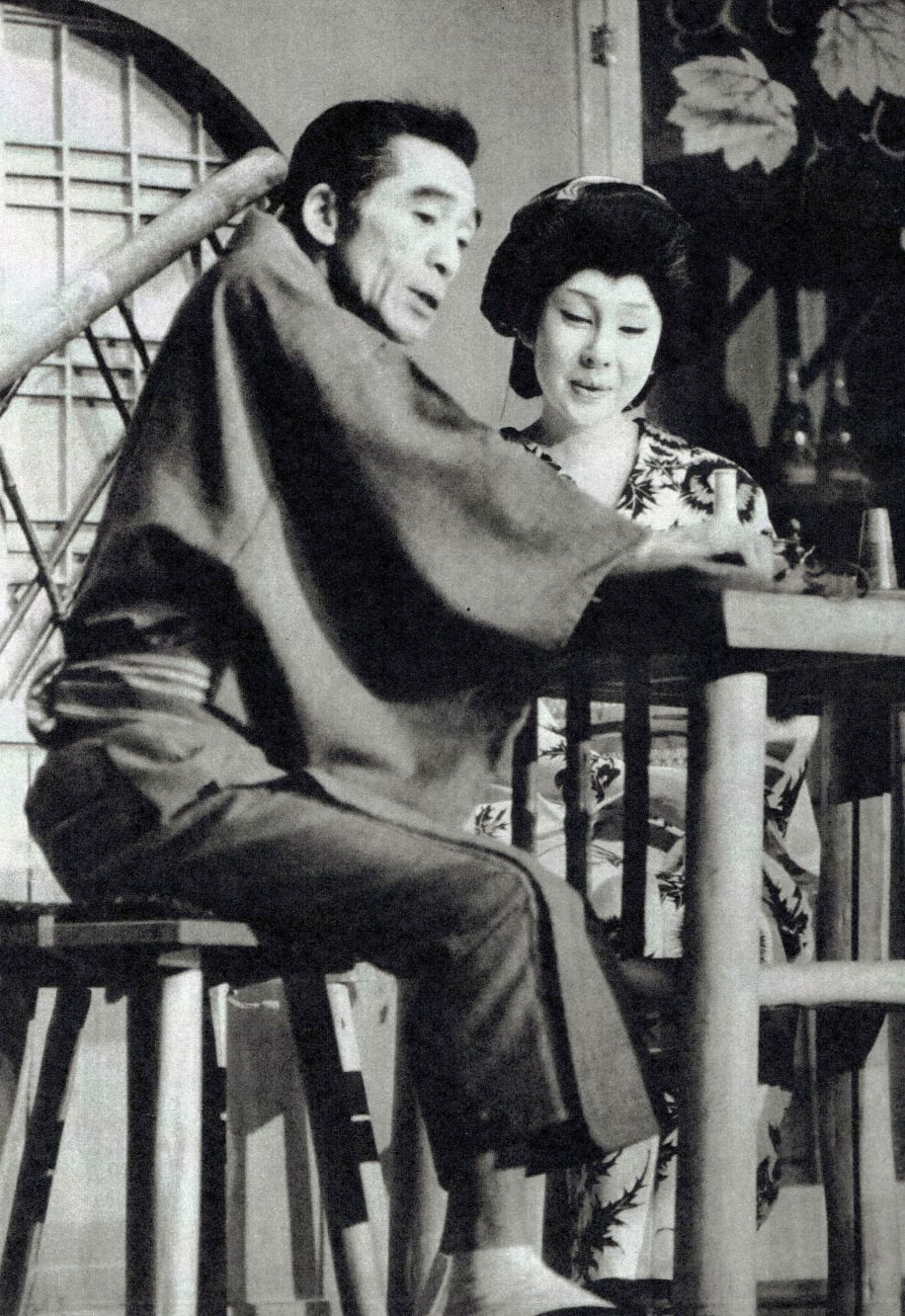
- Seiji Miyaguchi (left) and Michiko Saga on stage in 1966
- Born: 15 November 1913; Tokyo, Japan
- Died: 12 April 1985 (aged 71)
- Occupation: Actor
- Years active: 1933–1984
- Awards: Mainichi Film Award for Seven Samurai

Seiji Miyaguchi (宮口精二, Miyaguchi Seiji; 15 November 1913 – 12 April 1985) was a Japanese stage and film actor who appeared in films of Akira Kurosawa, Yasujirō Ozu, Mikio Naruse, Keisuke Kinoshita, Tadashi Imai and many others.

== Biography ==
Born in Tokyo and a graduate of Tokyo Municipal Junior High School, Miyaguchi was a co-founder of the Bungakuza theatre troupe in 1937. In 1949, he received the Mainichi Theater Award for his performance in Onna no issho and other plays.

Beginning in 1945, Miyaguchi acted in films as well. Notable performances include Akira Kurosawa's Seven Samurai and Yoshitarō Nomura's Stakeout. In addition, he starred in television productions like the Taikōki series.

== Filmography (selected) ==
=== Film ===
- 1945: Sanshiro Sugata Part II – Kohei Tsuzaki
- 1946: Urashima Tarō no kōei
- 1947: Sanbon yubi no otoko
- 1951: The Good Fairy – editor-in-chief
- 1951: Early Summer – Nishiwaki
- 1951: Fireworks over the Sea – Gunzō Ishiguro
- 1951: Inochi uruwashi – Oshima
- 1952: Ikiru – yakuza boss
- 1953: The Last Embrace – gangster
- 1953: Senkan Yamato
- 1953: An Inlet of Muddy Water – General Shichi (Story 3)
- 1954: Seven Samurai – Kyuzo, the master swordsman
- 1954: Taiyo no nai machi
- 1955: Izumi e no michi
- 1956: Early Spring
- 1956: Kyatsu o nigasuna
- 1956: Ankokugai
- 1956: Punishment Room – Hanya, Katsumi's father
- 1956: Onibi
- 1956: Aru onna no baai – Tomoki Hisamoto
- 1956: Flowing – Namie's uncle
- 1957: Throne of Blood – phantom samurai
- 1957: Tokyo Twilight – policeman
- 1957: Aruse
- 1957: Nikui mono
- 1957: Yoru no chō – customer
- 1957: Kiken na eiyu
- 1957: Jun'ai monogatari – judge
- 1957: Black River – Kin
- 1958: Stakeout – Yuji Shimooka, the police detective
- 1958: Kuroi kafun – Kitaga
- 1958: Rickshaw Man – fencing master
- 1958: The Ballad of Narayama – Mata-yan
- 1958: Ryu ni makasero
- 1958: Nemuri Kyōshirō burai hikae: Maken jigoku – Senjuro Takebe
- 1959: The Human Condition – Kyōritsu Ō
- 1959: Saikō shukun fujin – Rintaro Nonomiya
- 1959: Kiku to Isamu – doctor
- 1959: Farewell to Spring – Akira's father
- 1959: Aruhi watashi wa – Masao Shiroyama
- 1959: Mikkai
- 1959: Jōen – Ōshū Mitani
- 1960: Banana
- 1960: The Twilight Story – Yoshizo
- 1960: The Bad Sleep Well – Prosecutor Okakura
- 1960: 'Minagoroshi no uta' yori kenjū-yo saraba! – Takahashi
- 1961: Enraptured – Professor Nunokawa
- 1961: Miyamoto Musashi – bamboo craftsman Kisuke
- 1961: Aitsu to watashi – Kokichi, Saburo's father
- 1961: Kuroi gashū dainibu: Kanryū
- 1962: Karami-ai
- 1962: The Outcast – schoolmaster
- 1962: Miyamoto Musashi: Showdown at Hannyazaka Heights – bamboo craftsman Kisuke
- 1962: Gekkyū dorobo
- 1963: Attack Squadron!
- 1963: Twin Sisters of Kyoto – Takichiro Sada
- 1963: Mushukunin-betsuchō – Usuke
- 1963: Subarashii akujo
- 1963: Alibi – Asakichi Sagawa
- 1963: Mashiroki Fuji no ne – Shūhei Isomura
- 1963: Gobanchō yūgirirō – Sanzaemon
- 1963: Mother – doctor
- 1963: Hikaru umi – Seiji Tajima
- 1964: Kaze no bushi
- 1964: Pale Flower – gang leader
- 1964: Nihiki no mesu inu – Detective Tasaka
- 1964: Samurai from Nowhere – Tatewaki Komuro
- 1964: Unholy Desire – Genji Miyata
- 1964: Hadaka no jūyaku – Heikichi Hamanaka
- 1964: Akujo – Daizo Suzuki
- 1964: Ai to shi o mitsumete
- 1964: Kuruwa sodachi – Tsukada
- 1964: Kwaidan – old man (segment "Chawan no naka")
- 1964: Kenji Kirishima Saburō – Masayuki Mori
- 1965: Gulliver's Travels Beyond the Moon – Professor Gulliver (voice)
- 1965: Miseinen – Zoku cupola no aru machi – Tatsugorō Ishiguro
- 1965: Samurai Spy – Jinnai-Kazutaka Horikawa
- 1966: Panchi yarō – Wada's father
- 1967: Taifū to zakuro – Naokichi Kuwata
- 1967: Chikumagawa zesshō
- 1967: Japan's Longest Day – Foreign Minister Shigenori Togo
- 1968: Shachō hanjōki
- 1968: Zoku shacho hanjōki
- 1968: Rio no wakadaishō
- 1968: Admiral Yamamoto – Seiichi Itō
- 1968: Aniki no koibito – Ginsaku Kitagawa
- 1970: The Militarists – Foreign Minister Shigenori Togo
- 1971: To Love Again – Miya's father
- 1972: Tora-san's Dear Old Home – Utako's father
- 1974: The Fossil – Sunami
- 1974: Tora-san's Lovesick – Utako's father
- 1975: Aoi sanmyaku
- 1977: Melodies of a White Night
- 1980: Tobe ikarosu no tsubasa – Miwa
- 1980: Shōgun (TV Mini-Series) – Muraji
- 1982: The Challenge – old man
- 1982: Maboroshi no mizuumi – Yoshikane Nagao
- 1983: Hakujasho – Jikan
- 1984: Ningyo densetsu – Tatsuo
- 1984: Farewell to the Ark – old man
- 1986: Oedipus no yaiba – Yoshiyama (final film role)

=== Television ===
- 1965: Taikōki - Manase Dōsan
- 1972: Shin Heike Monogatari - Fujiwara no Shunzei
- 1976: Kaze to Kumo to Niji to - Musashi no Takeshiba
- 1979: Oretachi wa Tenshi da! (1979) Episode14
- 1983: Tokugawa Ieyasu - Torii Tadayoshi
- 1984: Sanga Moyu - Ichirō Kiyose

== Awards and honours ==
- 1949: Mainichi Theater Award
- 1955: Mainichi Film Concours for Best Supporting Actor Seven Samurai
- 1983: Medal with Purple Ribbon

== In popular culture ==
A character designed as a caricature of Miyaguchi is regularly featured in the cat-oriented manga Mon-chan and Me, published in Fusosha's popular webzine Joshi Spa! (Women's Spa!).
