= Japan Academy Film Prize for Outstanding Performance by an Actress in a Supporting Role =

Japanese film award

Japan Academy Prize for Best Actress in a Supporting Role
- Awarded for: Best Performance by an Actress in a Supporting Role
- Country: Japan
- Presented by: Japan Academy Prize Association
- First award: 1978
- Currently held by: Sakura Ando; A Man (2022)
- Website: japan-academy-prize.jp

The Japan Academy Prize for Outstanding Performance by an Actress in a Supporting Role is an award presented annually by the Japan Academy Prize Association.

At the 1st Japan Academy Prize ceremony held in 1978, Kaori Momoi was the first winner of this award for her role in The Yellow Handkerchief. Since its inception, the award has been given to 36 actresses. Kimiko Yo has received the most awards in this category with three awards. As of the 2019 ceremony, Kirin Kiki is the most recent winner in this category for her role as Hatsue Shibata in Shoplifters.

== Winners ==
Year	Actress	Role(s)	Film	Ref.
1977 (1st)	Kaori Momoi	Akemi Ogawa	The Yellow Handkerchief	
1978 (2nd)	Shinobu Otake	Yoshiko Sakai; Haruko Mizuno	The Incident; Seishoku no Ishibumi	
1979 (3rd)	Mayumi Ogawa	Reiko Karasawa; Haru Asano	The Three Undelivered Letters; Vengeance Is Mine	
1980 (4th)	Michiyo Ōkusu	Shuko Aochi	Zigeunerweisen	
1981 (5th)	Yūko Tanaka	Ōei; Omatsu	Edo Porn; Eijanaika	
1982 (6th)	Rumiko Koyanagi	Yoshie Furuya	To Trap a Kidnapper	
1983 (7th)	Atsuko Asano	Tamako; Azusa Ogata	The Geisha; Dirty Hero (ja)	
1984 (8th)	Kin Sugai	Kikue Amamiya; Sen Nakamura	The Funeral; Hissatsu: Sure Death	
1985 (9th)	Yoshiko Mita	Sho Hatori; Noriko Narumi	W's Tragedy; Haru no Kane	
1986 (10th)	Mieko Harada	Keiko Yajima; Yae; Ms. Ohana	House on Fire; Kokushi Muso; Prussian Blue no Shōzō (ja)	
1987 (11th)	Rino Katase	Asami Enoki; Kikugawa	Yakuza Ladies 2 (ja); Tokyo Bordello (ja)	
1988 (12th)	Eri Ishida	Tae; Sakiko Taniguchi; Noe Itō	Wuthering Heights; Hope and Pain; A Chaos of Flowers	
1989 (13th)	Etsuko Ichihara	Senkichi Mizuta; Shigeko Shizuma	Buddies (ja); Black Rain	
1990 (14th)	Eri Ishida	Michiko Hamasaki; Michiko Hamasaki; Mutsuko Miyabayashi	Tsuribaka Nisshi 2 Tsuribaka Nisshi 3 (ja); A Paucity of Flying Dreams	
1991 (15th)	Emi Wakui	Yōko Akiyama; Seiko Kawashima	No Worries on the Recruit Front; My Sons	
1992 (16th)	Miwako Okamura	Kogiku Kokuraya; Reiko	The Oil-Hell Murder; Netorare Sosuke	
1993 (17th)	Kyōko Kagawa	Professor's Wife	Madadayo	
1994 (18th)	Shigeru Muroi	Shizuko	Ghost Pub	
1995 (19th)	Nobuko Otowa	Toyoko Yanagawa	A Last Note	
1996 (20th)	Eri Watanabe	Toyoko Takahashi	Shall We Dance?	
1997 (21st)	Mitsuko Baisho	Masako Nakajima	The Eel	
1998 (22nd)	Kumiko Asō	Sonoko Manabe	Dr. Akagi	
1999 (23rd)	Kayoko Kishimoto	Kikujiro's Wife	Kikujiro	
2000 (24th)	Mieko Harada	Okin	After the Rain	
2001 (25th)	Ko Shibasaki	Tsubaki Sakurai	Go	
2002 (26th)	Tanie Kitabayashi	Grandma Oume	Letters from the Mountains (ja)	
2003 (27th)	Eri Fukatsu	Takiko Takezawa	Like Asura	
2004 (28th)	Masami Nagasawa	Aki Hirose	Crying Out Love in the Center of the World	
2005 (29th)	Hiroko Yakushimaru	Tomoe Suzuki	Always Sanchōme no Yūhi	
2006 (30th)	Yū Aoi	Kimiko Tanigawa	Hula Girls	
2007 (31st)	Masako Motai (ja)	Toyoko Kaneko	I Just Didn't Do It	
2008 (32nd)	Kimiko Yo	Yuriko Uemura	Departures	
2009 (33rd)	Kimiko Yo	Akemi Otake	Dear Doctor	
2010 (34th)	Kirin Kiki	Fusae Shimizu	Villain	
2011 (35th)	Hiromi Nagasaku	Kiwako Nonomiya / Rutsu	Rebirth (ja)	
2012 (36th)	Kimiko Yo	Tamiko Hamazaki	Anata e	
2013 (37th)	Yōko Maki	Yukari Saiki	Like Father, Like Son	
2014 (38th)	Haru Kuroki	Taki Nunomiya	The Little House	
2015 (39th)	Haru Kuroki	Machiko Sata	Nagasaki: Memories of My Son	
2016 (40th)	Hana Sugisaki	Azumi Sachino	Her Love Boils Bathwater	
2017 (41st)	Suzu Hirose	Sakie Yamanaka	The Third Murder	
2018 (42nd)	Kirin Kiki	Hatsue Shibata	Shoplifters	
2019 (43rd)	Masami Nagasawa	Yang Duan He	Kingdom	
2020 (44th)	Haru Kuroki	Wakana Kawakami	The Asadas	
2021 (45th)	Kaya Kiyohara	Mikiko Maruyama	In the Wake	
2022 (46th)	Sakura Ando	Rie Taniguchi	A Man	
2023 (47th)	Sakura Ando	Sumiko Ōta	Godzilla Minus One	
2024 (48th)	Riho Yoshioka	Sayaka Ando	Faceless	
2025 (49th)	Misato Morita	Tamae Yoshii	Night Flower	

== Multiple wins ==
The following individuals received two or more Best Supporting Actress awards:

Wins	Actress
3	Kimiko Yo
3	Haru Kuroki
2	Mieko Harada
2	Eri Ishida
2	Kirin Kiki
2	Masami Nagasawa
2	Sakura Ando
