= Hochi Film Awards =

Japanese film award

Hochi Film Award
- Awarded for: Excellence in filmmaking
- Country: Japan
- Presented by: Sports Hochi
- First award: 1976
- Website: www.hochi.co.jp/award/hochi_eigashou/

The Hochi Film Awards (報知映画賞, Hōchi Eiga Shō) are film-specific prizes awarded by the Hochi Shimbun. The awards are known as the first major Japanese film awards of the season, with their nominations typically announced in early November. One of their distinguishing features is the relatively large number of nominees compared with other film awards: around 20 in the film categories and 15 in the individual categories.

== Categories ==
- Best Picture
- Best International Picture
- Best Animated Picture (since 2017)
- Best Actor
- Best Actress
- Best Supporting Actor
- Best Supporting Actress
- Best New Artist
- Special Award
- Best Director

== Winner ==
Nr.	Year	Best Director	Best Picture	Best International Picture	Best Actor	Best Actress	Best Supporting Actor	Best Supporting Actress	Best New Artist	Special Award
1	1976	-	The Inugami Family (Kon Ichikawa)	Taxi Driver (Martin Scorsese)	Tatsuya Fuji (In the Realm of the Senses)	Kumiko Akiyoshi (Banka, Saraba natsuno hikariyo, Brother and Sister)	Hideji Ōtaki (Brother and Sister, Kimi yo funnu no kawa wo watare, Fumō Chitai)	Kiwako Taichi (Tora-san's Sunrise and Sunset)	Mieko Harada (The Youth Killer, Lullaby of the Earth)	-
2	1977	-	The Yellow Handkerchief (Yoji Yamada)	Slap Shot (George Roy Hill)	Ken Takakura (Mount Hakkoda, The Yellow Handkerchief)	Shima Iwashita (Ballad of Orin)	Katō Takeshi (The Devil's Ballad, Gokumon-to)	Ayumi Ishida (The Gate of Youth Part 2)	Tetsuya Takeda (The Yellow Handkerchief)	Hiromi Gō (Totsuzen arashi no yōni)
3	1978	-	Third Base (Yōichi Higashi)	Star Wars (George Lucas)	Ken Ogata (The Demon)	Meiko Kaji (The Love Suicides at Sonezaki)	Tsunehiko Watase (The Incident, Kōtei no inai hachigatsu, The Fall of Ako Castle)	Shinobu Otake (The Incident, Seishoku no ishibumi)	Toshiyuki Nagashima (Third Base, Kaerazaru hibi, The Incident)	-
4	1979	-	The Man Who Stole the Sun (Kazuhiko Hasegawa)	The Deer Hunter (Michael Cimino)	Kenji Sawada (The Man Who Stole the Sun)	Junko Miyashita (The Woman with Red Hair, Wet Weekend)	Rentarō Mikuni (Vengeance Is Mine)	Mayumi Ogawa (Vengeance Is Mine, The Three Undelivered Letters)	Kaoru Kobayashi (Jyu-hassai, umi e)	Work of Art Keiko
5	1980	-	Kagemusha (Akira Kurosawa)	Kramer vs. Kramer (Robert Benton)	Masato Furuoya (Disciples of Hippocrates)	Chieko Baisho (A Distant Cry from Spring, Otoko wa Tsurai yo: Series)	Tsutomu Yamazaki (Kagemusha)	Yoko Aki (Shiki Natsuko)	Keigo Oginome (Kaichō-on), Tatsuo Yamada (Crazy Thunder Road, Tekkihei, Tonda)	Work of Art Zigeunerweisen
6	1981	-	Enrai (Kichitaro Negishi)	The Tin Drum (Volker Schlöndorff)	Toshiyuki Nagashima (Enrai)	Keiko Matsuzaka (The Gate of Youth, Tora-san's Love in Osaka)	Katsuo Nakamura (Kagero-za, Buriki no kunsho, Love Letter, 仕事人梅安)	Yūko Tanaka (Edo Porn)	Director Kōhei Oguri (Muddy River), Eri Ishida (Enrai)	-
7	1982	-	Fall Guy (Kinji Fukasaku)	...All the Marbles (Robert Aldrich)	Mitsuru Hirata (Fall Guy)	Kaori Momoi (Giwaku)	Akira Emoto (Hearts and Flowers for Tora-san, Dotonbori River)	Miyako Yamaguchi (Farewell to the Land)	Satomi Kobayashi (I Are You, You Am Me)	Cinema Square Tōkyū
8	1983	-	The Family Game (Yoshimitsu Morita)	Flashdance (Adrian Lyne)	Yūsaku Matsuda (The Family Game, Detective Story)	Masako Natsume (The Catch, Time and Tide)	Juzo Itami (The Family Game, The Makioka Sisters, Izakaya Chōji, Meiso chizu, Grass Labyrinth)	Mitsuko Baisho (The Geisha and others), Eiko Nagashima (Ryuji)	Tomoyo Harada (Toki o Kakeru Shōjo)	-
9	1984	-	The Funeral (Itami Juzo)	The Natural (Barry Levinson)	Saburō Tokitō (The Miracle of Joe Petrel)	Sayuri Yoshinaga (Ohan, Station to Heaven)	Kaku Takashina (Mahjong hōrōki)	Kin Sugai (The Funeral)	Director Makoto Wada (Mahjong hōrōki)	Nobuko Miyamoto (The Funeral)
10	1985	Yoshimitsu Morita (And Then)	And Then (Yoshimitsu Morita)	Witness (Peter Weir)	Kin'ya Kitaōji (Himatsuri, Haru no Kane)	Mitsuko Baisho (Love Letter, Ikiteru uchiga hana nanoyo shin-dara sore madeyo to sengen)	Tomokazu Miura (Typhoon Club)	Yoshiko Mita (Haru no Kane, W's Tragedy)	Yoshinori Monta (Itoshiki hibiyo)	Minoru Chiaki (Gray Sunset)
11	1986	Kichitaro Negishi (Whooh! Exploration Unit)	Comic Magazine (Yōjirō Takita)	The Purple Rose of Cairo (Woody Allen)	Yuya Uchida (Comic Magazine)	Ayumi Ishida (House on Fire, Tokei – Adieu l'hiver)	Kei Suma (Final Take)	Mieko Harada (House on Fire)	Yuki Saito (Yuki no dansho - Jonetsu)	-
12	1987	Kazuo Hara (The Emperor's Naked Army Marches On)	A Taxing Woman (Juzo Itami)	Good Morning, Babylon (Paolo Taviani)	Takanori Jinnai (Chōchin)	Shinobu Otake (Eien no 1/2)	Masahiko Tsugawa (A Taxing Woman)	Junko Sakurada (Itazu Kuma)	Masahiro Takashima (Totto Channel, Bu Su)	-
13	1988	Hayao Miyazaki (My Neighbor Totoro)	Tomorrow (Kazuo Kuroki)	The Last Emperor (Bernardo Bertolucci)	Hiroyuki Sanada (Kaitō Ruby)	Narumi Yasuda (Bakayaro! I'm Plenty Mad)	Tsurutarō Kataoka (The Discarnates)	Eri Ishida (A Chaos of Flowers, Hope and Pain, Wuthering Heights)	Hiroshi Nishikawa (Kyōshū)	-
14	1989	Toshio Masuda (Shaso)	Untamagiru (Gō Takamine)	Die Hard (John McTiernan)	Rentarō Mikuni (Rikyu, Tsuribaka Nisshi)	Yoshiko Tanaka (Black Rain)	Yoshio Harada (Dotsuitarunen)	Hideko Yoshida (Shaso)	Hidekazu Akai (Dotsuitarunen)	Yūsaku Matsuda (Black Rain)
15	1990	Jun Ichikawa (Tugumi)	The Cherry Orchard (Shun Nakahara)	Field of Dreams (Phil Alden Robinson)	Bunta Sugawara (Tekken)	Keiko Matsuzaka (The Sting of Death)	Renji Ishibashi (Rōnin-gai)	Kanako Higuchi (Rōnin-gai)	Riho Makise (Tokyo Heaven, Tugumi), Director Joji Matsuoka (Swimming Upstream)	-
16	1991	Takeshi Kitano (A Scene at the Sea)	My Sons (Yōji Yamada)	The Silence of the Lambs (Jonathan Demme)	Masatoshi Nagase (My Sons, Asian Beat: I Love Nippon, Mo no shigoto)	Youki Kudoh (War and Youth)	Hiroshi Kanbe (Nowhere Man)	Jun Fubuki (Nowhere Man)	Hikari Ishida (Chizuko's Younger Sister, Waiting for the Flood, My Soul Is Slashed), Naoto Takenaka (Nowhere Man)	-
17	1992	Yōichi Higashi (The River with No Bridge)	Sumo Do, Sumo Don't (Masayuki Suo)	A League of Their Own (Penny Marshall)	Masahiro Motoki (Sumo Do, Sumo Don't)	Misa Shimizu (Okoge, Sumo Do, Sumo Don't, Future Memories: Last Christmas)	Takehiro Murata (Okoge, Minbo)	Miwako Fujitani (The Oil-Hell Murder, Sosuke Loses His Lover)	Yuki Sumida (The Strange Tale of Oyuki), Yoshiyuki Omori (The Rocking Horsemen, The Strange Tale of Oyuki)	-
18	1993	Yoichi Sai (All Under the Moon)	All Under the Moon (Yoichi Sai)	Unforgiven (Clint Eastwood)	Ken Tanaka (Bokyo)	Ruby Moreno (All Under the Moon)	Ittoku Kishibe (Made in Japan, Samurai Kids, Dying at a Hospital, Many Happy Returns)	Junko Sakurada (Moving)	Tomoko Tabata (Moving)	-
19	1994	Tatsumi Kumashiro (Like a Rolling Stone)	A Dedicated Life (Kazuo Hara)	Schindler's List (Steven Spielberg)	Kenichi Hagiwara (Ghost Pub)	Saki Takaoka (Crest of Betrayal)	Kiichi Nakai (47 Ronin)	Shigeru Muroi (Ghost Pub)	Tomoko Yamaguchi (Ghost Pub)	-
20	1995	Shunji Iwai (Love Letter)	A Last Note (Kaneto Shindō)	The Shawshank Redemption (Frank Darabont)	Hiroyuki Sanada (Kinkyu Yobidashi: Emergency Call, Sharaku, East Meets West)	Miho Nakayama (Love Letter)	Etsushi Toyokawa (Love Letter, No Way Back, Hanako)	Meiko Kaji (Onihei's Detective Records)	Sae Isshiki (Kura)	-
21	1996	Yoshimitsu Morita (Haru)	Shall We Dance? (Masayuki Suo)	Seven (David Fincher)	Koji Yakusho (Shall We Dance?, Sleeping Man, Shabu gokudo)	Mieko Harada (Village of Dreams)	Tetsuya Watari (Waga Kokoro no Ginga Tetsudō Miyazawa Kenji Monogatari)	Eriko Watanabe (Shall We Dance?)	Masanobu Andō (Kids Return)	Kyoshi Atsumi
22	1997	Masato Harada (Bounce Ko Gals)	Welcome Back, Mr. McDonald (Kōki Mitani)	Jerry Maguire (Cameron Crowe)	Koji Yakusho (The Eel, Lost Paradise, Bounce Ko Gals)	Hitomi Kuroki (Lost Paradise)	Masahiko Nishimura (Marutai no onna, Welcome Back, Mr. McDonald)	Mitsuko Baisho (Tokyo Lullaby, The Eel)	Takako Matsu (Tokyo biyori)	Work of Art Princess Mononoke
23	1998	Takeshi Kitano (Hana-bi)	Hana-bi (Takeshi Kitano)	Titanic (James Cameron)	Akira Emoto (Dr. Akagi)	Mieko Harada (Begging for Love)	Ren Osugi (Hana-bi, Dog Race)	Kumiko Asō (Dr. Akagi)	Rena Tanaka (Ganbatte Ikimasshoi)	-
24	1999	-	Jubaku: Spellbound (Masato Harada)	Shakespeare in Love (John Madden)	Tomokazu Miura (M/Other, Wait and See)	Jun Fubuki (Coquille, Jubaku: Spellbound)	Kippei Shiina (Jubaku: Spellbound, Sloping Shoulder Fox)	Junko Fuji (Wait and See, The Geisha House, Dreammaker)	Chizuru Ikewaki (Osaka Story), Director Akihiko Shiota (Moonlight Whispers, Don't Look Back)	-
25	2000	Yuji Nakae (Nabbie's Love)	Face (Junji Sakamoto)	Space Cowboys (Clint Eastwood)	Yūji Oda (Whiteout)	Naomi Fujiyama (Face)	Tadanobu Asano (Taboo, Gojoe: Spirit War Chronicle)	Naomi Nishida (Nabbie's Love)	Madoka Matsuda (Nagisa)	-
26	2001	Hayao Miyazaki (Spirited Away)	Go (Isao Yukisada)	Galaxy Quest (Dean Parisot)	Yōsuke Kubozuka (Go)	Kyōko Koizumi (Kaza-hana)	Tsutomu Yamazaki (Go, The Guys from Paradise, High School Girl's Friend)	Kou Shibasaki (Go, Battle Royale, Kakashi)	Hitomi Manaka (Koko ni irukoto)	-
27	2002	Yoji Yamada (The Twilight Samurai)	The Twilight Samurai (Yoji Yamada)	Monsters, Inc. (Peter Docter)	Seiichi Tanabe (Hush!, Harmful Insect)	Rie Miyazawa (The Twilight Samurai)	Ryo Ishibashi (Aiki, Dog Star)	Miho Kanno (Kewaishi, Dolls)	Kazushige Nagashima (Mr. Rookie)	-
28	2003	Hideo Onchi (Warabi no kō)	Doing Time (Yoichi Sai)	My Sassy Girl (Kwak Jae-yong)	Toshiyuki Nishida (Get Up!, Tsuribaka Nisshi 14)	Shinobu Terajima (Akame 48 Waterfalls)	Hiroyuki Miyasako (Thirteen Steps, Wild Berries)	Eri Fukatsu (Like Asura, Bayside Shakedown 2)	Satomi Ishihara (My Grandpa)	-
29	2004	Yoichi Sai (Blood and Bones)	Nobody Knows (Hirokazu Koreeda)	Seabiscuit (Gary Ross)	Satoshi Tsumabuki (Josee, the Tiger and the Fish, A Day on the Planet, 69)	Takako Matsu (The Hidden Blade)	Yoshido Harada (A Boy's Summer in 1945, The Face of Jizo, Niwatori wa hadashi da)	Masami Nagasawa (Crying Out Love in the Center of the World, Breathe In, Breathe Out)	Anna Tsuchiya (Kamikaze Girls, The Taste of Tea)	-
30	2005	Kenji Uchida (A Stranger of Mine)	Always Sanchōme no Yūhi (Takashi Yamazaki)	Cinderella Man (Ron Howard)	Somegoro Ichikawa (Ashurajō no Hitomi, The Samurai I Loved)	Yūko Tanaka (Hibi, The Milkwoman)	Shinichi Tsutsumi (Fly, Daddy, Fly, Always Sanchōme no Yūhi)	Hiroko Yakushimaru (Always Sanchōme no Yūhi)	Erika Sawajiri (Break Through!)	-
31	2006	Kichitaro Negishi (What the Snow Brings)	Hula Girls (Lee Sang-il)	Flags of Our Fathers (Clint Eastwood)	Ken Watanabe (Memories of Tomorrow)	Miki Nakatani (Memories of Matsuko and others)	Teruyuki Kagawa (Sway and others)	Yū Aoi (Hula Girls, Honey and Clover and others)	Kenichi Matsuyama (Death Note)	Anime film The Girl Who Leapt Through Time; Kazuo Kuroki
32	2007	Nobuhiro Yamashita (A Gentle Breeze in the Village, The Matsugane Potshot Affair)	I Just Didn't Do It (Masayuki Suo)	A Prairie Home Companion (Robert Altman)	Ryō Kase (I Just Didn't Do It)	Kumiko Asō (Town of Evening Calm, Country of Cherry Blossoms)	Shirō Itō (Talk, Talk, Talk, Maiko Haaaan!!!)	Hiromi Nagasaku (Funuke Show Some Love, You Losers!)	Kaho (A Gentle Breeze in the Village)	-
33	2008	Ryōsuke Hashiguchi (All Around Us)	Departures (Yōjirō Takita)	The Dark Knight (Christopher Nolan)	Shinichi Tsutsumi (Climber's High, Suspect X)	Kyōko Koizumi (Gou Gou, the Cat, Tokyo Sonata)	Masato Sakai (Climber's High, After School, Jaji no futari)	Kirin Kiki (Still Walking)	Ayane Nagabuchi (Sanbongi nōgyō kōkō, bajutsubu: Mokume no uma to shōjo no jitsuwa)	-
34	2009	Miwa Nishikawa (Dear Doctor)	Shizumanu Taiyō (Setsurō Wakamatsu)	Gran Torino (Clint Eastwood)	Ken Watanabe (Shizumanu Taiyō)	Takako Matsu (Villon's Wife, K-20: Legend of the Mask)	Eita Nagayama (Dear Doctor, Toad's Oil, April Bride, Nakumonka)	Kaoru Yachigusa (Dear Doctor, Toad's Oil, Listen to My Heart)	Masaki Okada (Gravity's Clowns and others); Hikari Mitsushima (Love Exposure, Pride, The Wonderful World of Captain Kuhio)	Michael Jackson's This Is It
35	2010	Tetsuya Nakashima (Confessions)	Villain (Lee Sang-il)	Avatar (James Cameron)	Etsushi Toyokawa (A Good Husband, Hisshiken Torisashi)	Eri Fukatsu (Villain)	Akira Emoto (Villain)	Rie Tomosaka (A Boy and His Samurai)	Nanami Sakuraba (Shodo Girls); Takahiro Miura (Railways)	-
36	2011	Sion Sono (Cold Fish)	Rebirth (Izuru Narushima)	Moneyball (Bennett Miller)	Masato Sakai (Tsure ga Utsu ni Narimashite, Nichirin no isan, Bushi no Kakeibo)	Hiromi Nagasaku (Wandering Home, Rebirth)	Denden (Cold Fish)	Nobuko Miyamoto (Hankyū Densha)	Mami Sunada (Ending Note)	Kaneto Shindō (Postcard)
37	2012	Daihachi Yoshida (The Kirishima Thing)	Key of Life (Kenji Uchida)	Argo (Ben Affleck)	Ken Takakura (Anata e)	Sayuri Yoshinaga (Kita no Kanaria-tachi)	Mirai Moriyama (A Chorus of Angels, Always: Sunset on Third Street '64)	Sakura Ando (For Love's Sake, The Samurai That Night)	Shinnosuke Mitsushima (11/25 The Day Mishima Chose His Own Fate); Rena Nōnen (Karasu no Oyayubi)	-
38	2013	Kazuya Shiraishi (The Devil's Path)	The Great Passage (Yuya Ishii)	42 (Brian Helgeland)	Ryuhei Matsuda (The Great Passage)	Yōko Maki (The Ravine of Goodbye, Sue, Mai & Sawa: Righting the Girl Ship)	Pierre Taki (The Devil's Path, Like Father, Like Son)	Chizuru Ikewaki (The Devil's Path, The Great Passage)	Tatsuki Yoshioka (A Boy Called H)	-
39	2014	Takashi Koizumi (A Samurai Chronicle)	0.5 mm (Momoko Andō)	Jersey Boys (Clint Eastwood)	Junichi Okada (The Eternal Zero)	Rie Miyazawa (Pale Moon)	Masahiko Tsugawa (0.5 mm)	Yuko Oshima (Pale Moon)	Nana Komatsu (The World of Kanako); Hiroomi Tosaka (Hot Road); Masafumi Nishida (Oh Brother, Oh Sister!)	Frozen; Ken Takakura
40	2015	Yukihiko Tsutsumi (The Big Bee, Initiation Love)	Solomon's Perjury (Izuru Narushima)	Still Life (Uberto Pasolini)	Kōichi Satō (Kishūteneki Terminal, The Pearls of the Stone Man)	Kirin Kiki (Sweet Bean)	Masahiro Motoki (The Emperor in August)	Yō Yoshida (Flying Colors, Nōnai Poison Berry, The Pearls of the Stone Man, Hero)	Suzu Hirose (Our Little Sister); Ryōko Fujino (Solomon's Perjury)	Momoiro Clover Z (Maku ga Agaru); Katsuyuki Motohiro (Maku ga Agaru)
41	2016	Lee Sang-il (Rage)	Her Love Boils Bathwater (Ryōta Nakano)	Creed (Ryan Coogler)	Tomokazu Miura (The Katsuragi Murder Case)	Rie Miyazawa (Her Love Boils Bathwater)	Gō Ayano (Rage)	Hana Sugisaki (Her Love Boils Bathwater)	Takanori Iwata (Evergreen Love); Ryōta Nakano (Her Love Boils Bathwater)	Your Name

Nr.	Year	Best Picture	Best International Picture	Best Animated Picture	Best Director	Best Actor	Best Actress	Best Supporting Actor	Best Supporting Actress	Best New Artist	Special Award
42	2017	Wilderness (Yoshiyuki Kishi)	Beauty and the Beast (Bill Condon)	Sing	Yukiko Mishima (Dear Etranger)	Masaki Suda (Wilderness, Kiseki: Sobito of That Day, Teiichi: Battle of Supreme High, Hibana: Spark)	Yū Aoi (Birds Without Names)	Koji Yakusho (The Third Murder, Sekigahara)	Rena Tanaka (Dear Etranger )	Minami Hamabe (Let Me Eat Your Pancreas); Takumi Kitamura (Let Me Eat Your Pancreas)	Takeshi Kitano (Outrage trilogy); Stephen Nomura Schible (Ryuichi Sakamoto: Coda)
43	2018	The Blood of Wolves (Kazuya Shiraishi)	Wonder (Stephen Chbosky)	Detective Conan: Zero the Enforcer	Tatsushi Ōmori (Every Day a Good Day)	Koji Yakusho (The Blood of Wolves)	Ryoko Shinohara (The House Where the Mermaid Sleeps, Sunny: Our Hearts Beat Together)	Kazunari Ninomiya (Killing for the Prosecution)	Kirin Kiki (Shoplifters, Every Day a Good Day, Mori, The Artist's Habitat)	Sara Minami (Shino Can't Say Her Name); Aju Makita (Shino Can't Say Her Name)	One Cut of the Dead
44	2019	Listen to the Universe (Kei Ishikawa)	Joker (Todd Phillips)	Weathering with You	Shinsuke Sato (Kingdom)	Kiichi Nakai (Hit Me Anyone One More Time)	Masami Nagasawa (Masquerade Hotel, The Confidence Man JP: The Movie)	Ryo Narita (Chiwawa, Just Only Love, Farewell Song)	Nana Komatsu (It Comes, Family of Strangers)	Tina Tamashiro (Diner, The Flowers of Evil); Ouji Suzuka (Listen to the Universe)	Fly Me to the Saitama
45	2020	The Voice of Sin (Nobuhiro Doi)	Tenet (Christopher Nolan)	Demon Slayer: Kimetsu no Yaiba the Movie: Mugen Train	Naomi Kawase (True Mothers)	Shun Oguri (The Voice of Sin)	Asami Mizukawa (A Beloved Wife)	Gen Hoshino (The Voice of Sin)	Aju Makita (True Mothers)	Misaki Hattori (Midnight Swan); Hio Miyazawa (His)	Mishima: The Last Debate
46	2021	In the Wake (Takahisa Zeze)	No Time to Die (Cary Joji Fukunaga)	Fortune Favors Lady Nikuko	Tetsu Maeda (And So the Baton Is Passed and What Happened to Our Nest Egg!?)	Takuya Kimura (Masquerade Night)	Mei Nagano (And So the Baton Is Passed and Jigoku no Hanazono: Office Royale)	Ryohei Suzuki (Last of the Wolves)	Shinobu Terajima (A Family, It's a Flickering Life and Intolerance)	Yuki Katayama (A Madder Red); Fukase (Character); Takehide Hori (Junk Head)	Yūsuke Okada
47	2022	A Man (Kei Ishikawa)	Top Gun: Maverick (Joseph Kosinski)	Tatami Time Machine Blues	Shinzō Katayama (Missing)	Masaharu Fukuyama (Silent Parade)	Kasumi Arimura (Prior Convictions)	Ryusei Yokohama (Wandering)	Machiko Ono (Soul at Twenty, Thousand and One Nights and Sabakan)	Lina Arashi (My Small Land); Haruto Shiratori (It's All My Fault)	
48	2023	The Moon (Yuya Ishii)	Gran Turismo (Neill Blomkamp)	The Super Mario Bros. Movie	Takashi Yamazaki (Godzilla Minus One)	Ryusei Yokohama (The Village and One Last Bloom)	Haruka Ayase (The Legend and Butterfly and Revolver Lily)	Hayato Isomura (The Moon)	Fumi Nikaido (The Moon)	Aina the End (Kyrie)	
49	2024	Faceless (Michihito Fujii)	Civil War (Alex Garland)	Look Back	Ayuko Tsukahara (Last Mile)	Ryusei Yokohama (Faceless)	Satomi Ishihara (Missing)	Eiji Okuda (Stay Mum)	Riho Yoshioka (Faceless)	Keitatsu Koshiyama (My Sunshine); Kiara Nakanishi (My Sunshine)	Mitsuko Kusabue (90 Years Old – So What?); Sei Hiraizumi (Tomorrow in the Finder)
50	2025	Kokuho (Lee Sang-il)	Emilia Pérez (Jacques Audiard)	Demon Slayer: Kimetsu no Yaiba – The Movie: Infinity Castle	Lee Sang-il (Kokuho)	Ryo Yoshizawa (Kokuho)	Keiko Kitagawa (Night Flower)	Jiro Sato (Suzuki=Bakudan)	Misato Morita (Night Flower)	Takaya Matsutani (One Last Throw)	Kokuho
