= Japan Academy Film Prize =

Japanese film award

- Current: 48th Japan Academy Film Prize
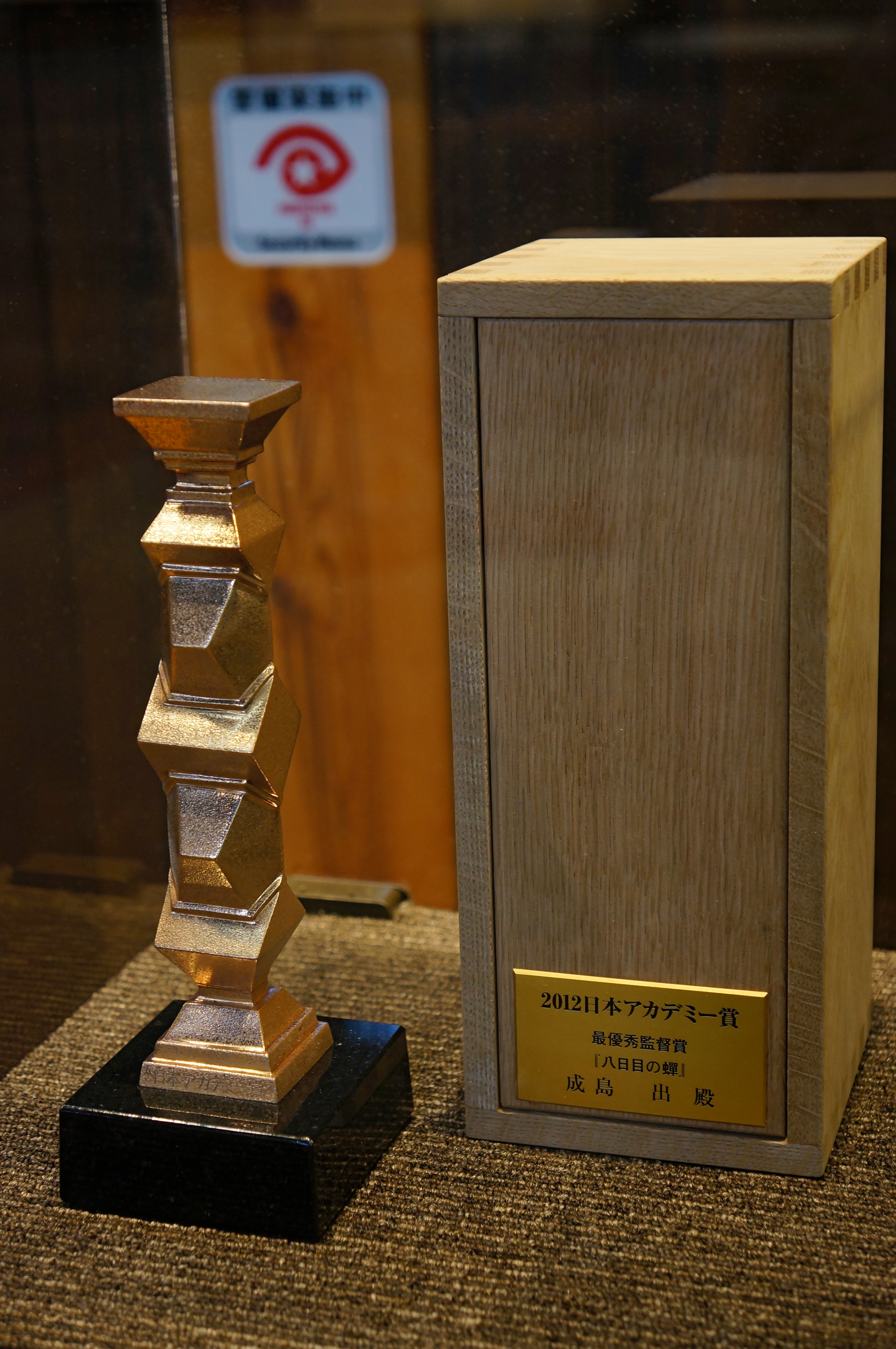
- Trophy of the Japan Academy Prize
- Awarded for: Excellence in film making
- Country: Japan
- Presented by: Japan Academy Film Prize Association
- First award: 1978
- Website: japan-academy-prize.jp

The Japan Academy Film Prize (日本アカデミー賞, Nippon Akademii-shou), often called the Japan Academy Prize, the Japan Academy Awards, and the Japanese Academy Awards, is a series of awards given annually since 1978 by the Japan Academy Film Prize Association (日本アカデミー賞協会, Nippon Akademii-shou Kyoukai) for excellence in Japanese film. Award categories are similar to the Academy Awards.

== Venue ==
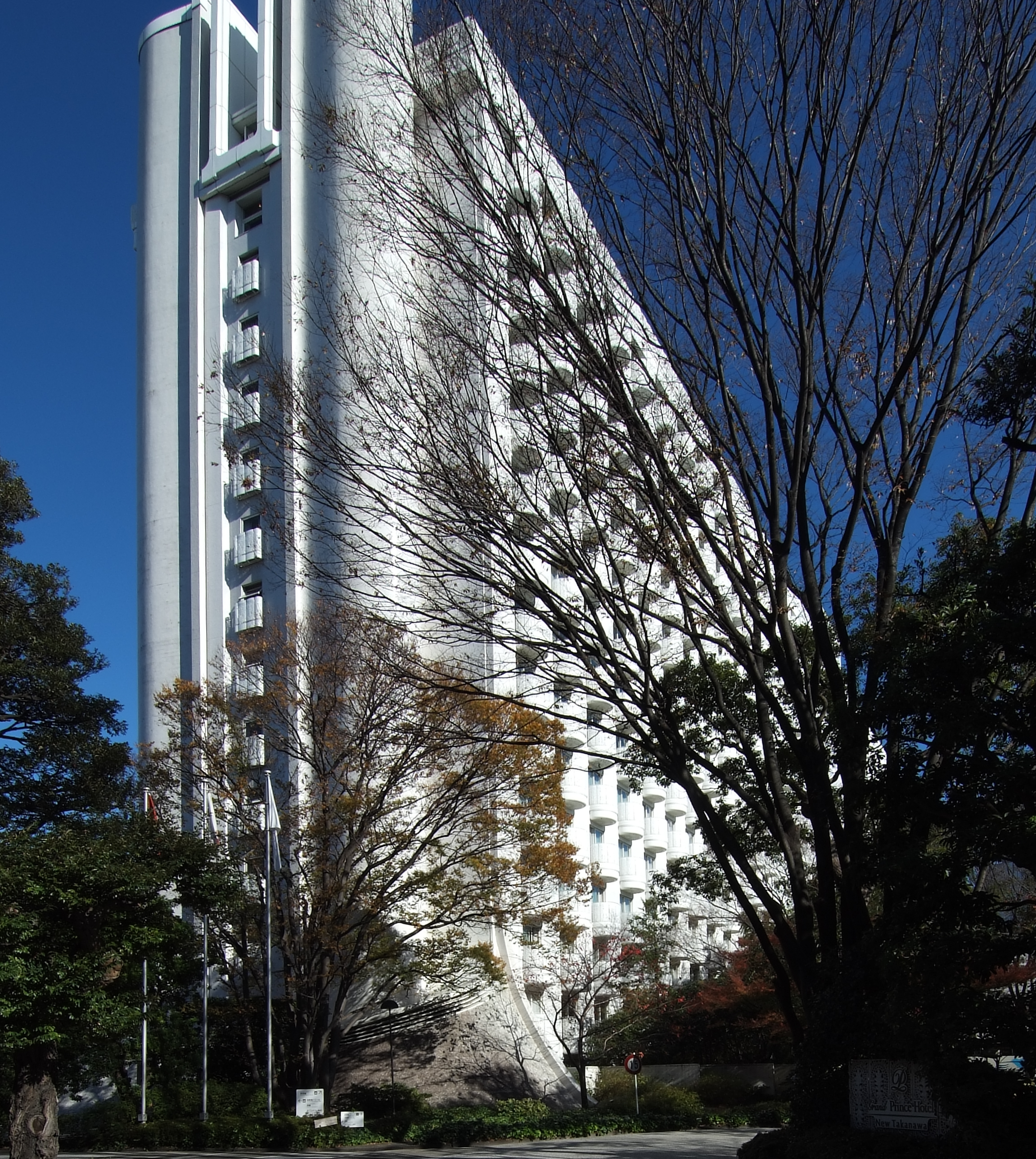
Grand Prince Hotel New Takanawa

Since 1998, the venue is regularly held at the Grand Prince Hotel New Takanawa of Prince Hotels in Takanawa, Minato-ku, Tokyo. Admission tickets for this award ceremony are also sold to regular customers.

As of 2015, there is a charge of 40,000 Yen which includes a French cuisine course dinner named after the award ceremony. Spectators are expected to attend in semi-formal attire. Elementary school students and younger are not permitted.

== Award ==
The winners are selected from the recipients of the Award for Excellence. The award statue of the winner measures 27 cm × 11 cm × 11 cm (10.7 in × 4.4 in × 4.4 in). The recipients of the Award for Excellence receive a smaller statue.

== Categories ==
- Picture of the Year
- Animation of the Year
- Director of the Year
- Screenplay of the Year
- Outstanding Performance by an Actor in a Leading Role
- Outstanding Performance by an Actress in a Leading Role
- Outstanding Performance by an Actor in a Supporting Role
- Outstanding Performance by an Actress in a Supporting Role
- Outstanding Achievement in Music
- Outstanding Achievement in Cinematography
- Outstanding Achievement in Lighting Direction
- Outstanding Achievement in Art Direction
- Outstanding Achievement in Sound Recording
- Outstanding Achievement in Film Editing
- Outstanding Foreign Language Film
- Newcomer of the Year
- Popularity Award
- Special Award of Honour from the Association
- Special Award from the Chairman
- Special Award from the Association

== Award winners ==
Time	Year	Category	Award winners / winners	Notes
1	1978 (Shōwa 53)	Best Work Award; Best Director Award; Best Screenplay Award; Best Actor Award; Best Actress; Best Supporting Actor Award; Best Supporting Actress Award	"The Yellow Handkerchief" (Yoji Yamada); Yoji Yamada - "The Yellow Handkerchief"; Yoji Yamada / Yoshitaka Asama - "The Yellow Handkerchief"; Ken Takakura - "The Yellow Handkerchief", "Mount Hakkoda"; Shima Iwashita - "Ballad of Orin"; Tetsuya Takeda - "The Yellow Handkerchief"; Kaori Momoi - "The Yellow Handkerchief"	
2	1979 (Shōwa 54)	Best Work Award; Best Director Award; Best Screenplay Award; Best Actor Award; Best Actress; Best Supporting Actor Award; Best Supporting Actress Award	"The Incident" (Yoshitarō Nomura); Yoshitarō Nomura - "The Incident", "The Demon"; Shinto Kaneto - "The Incident"; Ken Ogata - "The Demon"; Shinobu Otake - "The Incident"; Tsunehiko Watase - "The Incident"; Shinobu Otake - "Seishoku no ishibumi" (聖職の碑)	The 40,000 yen party admission ticket, which was partially criticized for its high price in the first round, was greatly reduced to 8000 yen. However, after that, it returned to 40,000 yen again.
3	1980 (Shōwa 55)	Best Work Award; Best Director Award; Best Screenplay Award; Best Actor Award; Best Actress; Best Supporting Actor Award; Best Supporting Actress Award	"Vengeance Is Mine" (Shōhei Imamura); Shōhei Imamura - "Vengeance Is Mine"; Baba Masaru - "Vengeance Is Mine"; Tomisaburo Wakayama - "Oh, My Son!" (衝動殺人 息子よ); Kaori Momoi - "Heaven Sent" (神様のくれた赤ん坊), "No More Easy Life"; Bunta Sugawara - "The Man Who Stole the Sun"; Mayumi Ogawa - "The Three Undelivered Letters" (配達されない三通の手紙), "Vengeance Is Mine"	
4	1981 (Shōwa 56)	Best Work Award; Best Director Award; Best Screenplay Award; Best Actor Award; Best Actress; Best Supporting Actor Award; Best Supporting Actress Award	"Zigeunerweisen" (Seijun Suzuki); Seijun Suzuki - "Zigeunerweisen"; Yoshitaka Asama, Yoji Yamada - "A Distant Cry from Spring", "Tora-san's Tropical Fever"; Ken Takakura - "Dōran" (動乱), "A Distant Cry from Spring"; Chieko Baisho - "A Distant Cry from Spring", "Tora-san's Tropical Fever"; Tetsuro Tamba - "The Battle of Port Arthur"; Michiyo Ōkusu - "Zigeunerweisen"	Akira Kurosawa declined to receive the award of excellence for Kagemusha. The best work award was won by Zigeunerweisen, an independent production and distribution company.
5	1982 (Shōwa 57)	Best Work Award; Best Director Award; Best Screenplay Award; Best Actor Award; Best Actress; Best Supporting Actor Award; Best Supporting Actress Award	"Station" (Yasuo Furuhata); Kohei Oguri - "Muddy River"; Sō Kuramoto - "Station"; Ken Takakura - "Station"; Keiko Matsuzaka - "The Gate of Youth", "Tora-san's Love in Osaka"; Katsuo Nakamura - "Kagero-za", "Love Letter", "Shikake-nin Baian", "Buriki no kunsho" Yuko Tanaka - "Edo Porn", "Eijanaika"	
6	1983 (Shōwa 58)	Best Work Award; Best Director Award; Best Screenplay Award; Best Actor Award; Best Actress; Best Supporting Actor Award; Best Supporting Actress Award	"Fall Guy" (Kinji Fukasaku); Kinji Fukasaku - "Fall Guy", "Dotonbori River"; Kōhei Tsuka - "Fall Guy"; Mitsuru Hirata - "Fall Guy"; Keiko Matsuzaka - "Fall Guy", "Dotonbori River"; Morio Kazama - "Fall Guy"; Rumiko Koyanagi - "To Trap a Kidnapper"	
7	1984 (Shōwa 59)	Best Work Award; Best Director Award; Best Screenplay Award; Best Actor Award; Best Actress; Best Supporting Actor Award; Best Supporting Actress Award	"The Ballad of Narayama" (Shōhei Imamura); Hideo Gosha - "The Geisha"; Kōji Takada - "The Geisha"; Ken Ogata - "The Ballad of Narayama", "The Geisha", "The Catch"; Rumiko Koyanagi - "Hakujasho"; Morio Kazama - "The Geisha", "Theater of Life"; Atsuko Asano - "The Geisha", "Dirty Hero"	The Geisha monopolized wins in 5 of the 6 individual awards (director, screenwriter, leading actor, supporting actor, supporting actress), but was not nominated for an excellence award. The cause is unknown because the selection process was not announced.
8	1985 (Shōwa 60)	Best Work Award; Best Director Award; Best Screenplay Award; Best Actor Award; Best Actress; Best Supporting Actor Award; Best Supporting Actress Award	"The Funeral" (Juzo Itami); Juzo Itami - "The Funeral"; Juzo Itami - "The Funeral"; Tsutomu Yamazaki - "The Funeral", "Farewell to the Ark"; Sayuri Yoshinaga - "Ohan", "Station to Heaven"; Kaku Takashina - "Mahjong hōrōki" Kin Sugai - "The Funeral", "Hissatsu: Sure Death"	Independent production The Funeral (distribution: ATG Japan Art Theatre Guild) won the Best Film Award.
9	1986 (Shōwa 61)	Best Work Award; Best Director Award; Best Screenplay Award; Best Actor Award; Best Actress; Best Supporting Actor Award; Best Supporting Actress Award	"Gray Sunset" (Shunya Itō); Shinichiro Sawai - "Early Spring Story", "W's Tragedy"; Hiro Matsuda (松田寛夫) - "Gray Sunset"; Minoru Chiaki - "Gray Sunset"; Mitsuko Baisho - "Nuclear Gypsies", "Love Letter", "Let Him Rest in Peace" (友よ、静かに瞑れ); Kaoru Kobayashi - "Love Letter", "Sorekara"; Yoshiko Mita - "W's Tragedy", "Haru no Kane"	
10	1987 (Shōwa 62)	Best Work Award; Best Director Award; Best Screenplay Award; Best Actor Award; Best Actress; Best Supporting Actor Award; Best Supporting Actress Award	"House on Fire" (Kinji Fukasaku); Kinji Fukasaku - "House on Fire"; Fumio Konami, Kinji Fukasaku - "House on Fire"; Ken Ogata - "House on Fire"; Ayumi Ishida - "House on Fire", "Tokei – Adieu l'hiver" Hitoshi Ueki - "Congratulatory Speech" (祝辞), "Big Joys, Small Sorrows"; Mieko Harada - "House on Fire", "Kokushi Muso" (国士無双), "Portrait in Prussian Blue"	The Sea and Poison, which had won numerous awards both in Japan and abroad, was expected to dominate the awards, but it was not even nominated. Instead, it received a Special Award. The result was thus unclear, and this opaque result was widely covered in the media. The film critic Oguro Toyoshi, who is known for his acerbic tongue, severely criticized and condemned the existence of the Japan Academy Awards using a whole page of the movie magazine "Roadshow" ("Ijiwaru Critic Enma Book").
11	1988 (Shōwa 63)	Best Work Award; Best Director Award; Best Screenplay Award; Best Actor Award; Best Actress; Best Supporting Actor Award; Best Supporting Actress Award	"A Taxing Woman" (Juzo Itami); Juzo Itami - "A Taxing Woman"; Juzo Itami - "A Taxing Woman"; Tsutomu Yamazaki - "A Taxing Woman"; Nobuko Miyamoto - "A Taxing Woman"; Masahiko Tsugawa - "A Taxing Woman", "Night Train"; Rino Katase - "Yakuza Ladies 2" (極道の妻たち II), "Tokyo Bordello" (吉原炎上)	
12	1989 (Shōwa 64 / Heisei 1)	Best Work Award; Best Director Award; Best Screenplay Award; Best Actor Award; Best Actress; Best Supporting Actor Award; Best Supporting Actress Award	"The Silk Road" (Junya Sato); Junya Sato - "The Silk Road"; Shin'ichi Ichikawa (市川森一 ) - "The Discarnates"; Toshiyuki Nishida - "The Silk Road"; Sayuri Yoshinaga - "Crane" (つる-鶴-), "A Chaos of Flowers"; Tsurutaro Kataoka - "The Discarnates", "Yojo no jidai" (妖女の時代); Eri Ishida - "Wuthering Heights", "Hope and Pain", "A Chaos of Flowers"	
13	1990 (Heisei 2)	Best Work Award; Best Director Award; Best Screenplay Award; Best Actor Award; Best Actress; Best Supporting Actor Award; Best Supporting Actress Award	"Black Rain" (Shōhei Imamura); Shōhei Imamura - "Black Rain"; Toshiro Ishido (石堂淑朗), Shōhei Imamura - "Black Rain"; Rentaro Mikuni - "Tsuribaka Nisshi", "Rikyu"; Yoshiko Tanaka - "Black Rain"; Bando Eiji - "Buddies" (あ・うん); Etsuko Ichihara - "Black Rain", "Buddies" (あ・うん)	Beat Takeshi, who was nominated for Outstanding Actor in Violent Cop, appeared at the beginning of a TV adaptation of Kurama Tengu (a novel by Jirō Osaragi) the same year and became a hot topic.
14	1991 (Heisei 3)	Best Work Award; Best Director Award; Best Screenplay Award; Best Actor Award; Best Actress; Best Supporting Actor Award; Best Supporting Actress Award	"Childhood Days" (Masahiro Shinoda); Masahiro Shinoda - "Childhood Days"; Taichi Yamada - "Childhood Days"; Ittoku Kishibe - "The Sting of Death"; Keiko Matsuzaka - "The Sting of Death"; Renji Ishibashi - "Cats on Park Avenue", "Roningai", "Ready to Shoot"; Eri Ishida - "Tsuribaka Nisshi 2", "Tsuribaka Nisshi 3", "I Haven't Dreamed of Flying for a While"	Akira Kurosawa, who declined the nomination for Kagemusha in the 4th edition, accepted the work and director nominations for Dreams, but did not win in either category.
15	1992 (Heisei 4)	Best Work Award; Best Director Award; Best Screenplay Award; Best Actor Award; Best Actress; Best Supporting Actor Award; Best Supporting Actress Award	"My Sons" (Yoji Yamada); Kihachi Okamoto - "Rainbow Kids"; Kihachi Okamoto - "Rainbow Kids"; Rentaro Mikuni - "Tsuribaka Nisshi 4", "My Sons"; Tanie Kitabayashi- "Rainbow Kids"; Masatoshi Nagase - "My Sons", "Mourning Work" (喪の仕事); Emi Wakui - "No Worries on the Recruit Front", "My Sons"	Nakao Sakai, who worked on many actresses' hairstyles for director Yasujiro Ozu and director Akira Kurosawa, received the Association Special Award.
16	1993 (Heisei 5)	Best Work Award; Best Director Award; Best Screenplay Award; Best Actor Award; Best Actress; Best Supporting Actor Award; Best Supporting Actress Award	"Sumo Do, Sumo Don't" (Masayuki Suo); Masayuki Suo - "Sumo Do, Sumo Don't"; Masayuki Suo - "Sumo Do, Sumo Don't"; Masahiro Motoki - "Sumo Do, Sumo Don't"; Yoshiko Mita - "Tōki Rakujitsu"; Naoto Takenaka - "Sumo Do, Sumo Don't", "Original Sin"; Miwako Fujitani - "The Oil-Hell Murder", "Sosuke Loses His Lover" (寝盗られ宗介)	
17	1994 (Heisei 6)	Best Work Award; Best Director Award; Best Screenplay Award; Best Actor Award; Best Actress; Best Supporting Actor Award; Best Supporting Actress Award	"A Class to Remember" (Yoji Yamada); Yoji Yamada - "Tora-san's Matchmaker", "A Class to Remember"; Yoji Yamada, Yoshitaka Asama - "Tora-san's Matchmaker", "A Class to Remember"; Toshiyuki Nishida - "A Class to Remember", "Tsuribaka Nisshi 6"; Emi Wakui - "Rainbow Bridge" (虹の橋); Kunie Tanaka - "A Class to Remember", "Lone Wolf and Cub: Final Conflict", "Rainbow Bridge" (虹の橋); Kyoko Kagawa - "Madadayo"	
18	1995 (Heisei 7)	Best Work Award; Best Director Award; Best Screenplay Award; Best Actor Award; Best Actress; Best Supporting Actor Award; Best Supporting Actress Award	"Crest of Betrayal" (Kinji Fukasaku); Kinji Fukasaku - "Crest of Betrayal"; Motomu Furuta (古田求) / Kinji Fukasaku - "Crest of Betrayal"; Kōichi Satō (actor) - "Crest of Betrayal"; Saki Takaoka - "Crest of Betrayal"; Kiichi Nakai - "47 Ronin"; Shigeru Muroi - "Ghost Pub"	
19	1996 (Heisei 8)	Best Work Award; Best Director Award; Best Screenplay Award; Best Actor Award; Best Actress; Best Supporting Actor Award; Best Supporting Actress Award	"A Last Note" (Kaneto Shindo); Kaneto Shindo - "A Last Note"; Kaneto Shindo - "A Last Note"; Rentaro Mikuni - "Mitabi no Kaikyō" (三たびの海峡); Yuko Asano - "Kura"; Naoto Takenaka - "East Meets West"; Nobuko Otowa - "A Last Note"	Independent production A Last Note (distribution: Japanese Herald Film) won the Best Film Award.
20	1997 (Heisei 9)	Best Work Award; Best Director Award; Best Screenplay Award; Best Actor Award; Best Actress; Best Supporting Actor Award; Best Supporting Actress Award	"Shall We Dance?" (Masayuki Suo); Masayuki Suo - "Shall We Dance?"; Masayuki Suo - "Shall We Dance?"; Koji Yakusho - "Shall We Dance?"; Tamiyo Kusakari- "Shall We Dance?"; Naoto Takenaka - "Shall We Dance?"; Eriko Watanabe - "Shall We Dance?"	Shall We Dance? won 14 awards, the highest ever.
21	1998 (Heisei 10)	Best Work Award; Best Director Award; Best Screenplay Award; Best Actor Award; Best Actress; Best Supporting Actor Award; Best Supporting Actress Award	"Princess Mononoke" (Hayao Miyazaki); Shōhei Imamura - "The Eel"; Koki Mitani - "Welcome Back, Mr. McDonald"; Koji Yakusho - "The Eel"; Hitomi Kuroki - "A Lost Paradise"; Masahiko Nishimura - "Welcome Back, Mr. McDonald"; Mitsuko Baisho - "The Eel"	Princess Mononoke was the first animated work nominated for an award and won the Best Film Award.
22	1999 (Heisei 11)	Best Work Award; Best Director Award; Best Screenplay Award; Best Actor Award; Best Actress; Best Supporting Actor Award; Best Supporting Actress Award	"Begging for Love" (Hideyuki Hirayama); Hideyuki Hirayama - "Begging for Love"; Yoshinobu Tei (鄭 義信) - "Begging for Love"; Akira Emoto - "Dr. Akagi"; Mieko Harada - "Begging for Love"; Chosuke Ikariya - "Bayside Shakedown"; Kumiko Aso - "Dr. Akagi"	
23	2000 (Heisei 12)	Best Work Award; Best Director Award; Best Screenplay Award; Best Actor Award; Best Actress; Best Supporting Actor Award; Best Supporting Actress Award	"Poppoya" (Yasuo Furuhata); Yasuo Furuhata - "Poppoya"; Yoshiki Iwama (岩間芳樹), Yasuo Furuhata - "Poppoya"; Ken Takakura - "Poppoya"; Shinobu Otake - "Poppoya"; Jun Kobayashi - "Poppoya"; Kishimoto Kayoko - "Kikujiro"	
24	2001 (Heisei 13)	Best Work Award; Best Director Award; Best Screenplay Award; Best Actor Award; Best Actress; Best Supporting Actor Award; Best Supporting Actress Award	"After the Rain" (Takashi Koizumi); Junji Sakamoto - "Face"; Akira Kurosawa - "After the Rain"; Akira Terao - "After the Rain"; Sayuri Yoshinaga - "It Is a Long Walk"; Kōichi Satō (actor) - "Whiteout"; Mieko Harada - "After the Rain"	
25	2002 (Heisei 14)	Best Work Award; Best Director Award; Best Screenplay Award; Best Actor Award; Best Actress; Best Supporting Actor Award; Best Supporting Actress Award	"Spirited Away" (Hayao Miyazaki); Isao Yukisada - "Go"; Kankurō Kudō - "Go"; Yosuke Kubozuka - "Go"; Keiko Kishi - "Kaa-chan" (かあちゃん); Tsutomu Yamazaki - "Go"; Ko Shibasaki - "Go"	Ken Takakura declined the Best Actor Award for Firefly. Arnold Schwarzenegger also appeared as a special guest to commemorate the 25th anniversary.
26	2003 (Heisei 15)	Best Work Award; Best Director Award; Best Screenplay Award; Best Actor Award; Best Actress; Best Supporting Actor Award; Best Supporting Actress Award	"The Twilight Samurai" (Yoji Yamada); Yoji Yamada - "The Twilight Samurai"; Yoji Yamada, Yoshitaka Asama (朝間 義隆) - "The Twilight Samurai"; Hiroyuki Sanada - "The Twilight Samurai"; Rie Miyazawa - "The Twilight Samurai"; Min Tanaka - "The Twilight Samurai"; Tanie Kitabayashi - "Letters from the Mountains"	The Twilight Samurai achieved 12 awards, the most after Shall We Dance? at the 20th edition.
27	2004 (Heisei 16)	Best Work Award; Best Director Award; Best Screenplay Award; Best Actor Award; Best Actress; Best Supporting Actor Award; Best Supporting Actress Award	"When the Last Sword Is Drawn" (Yōjirō Takita); Yoshimitsu Morita - "Like Asura"; Tomomi Tsutsui (筒井 ともみ) - "Like Asura"; Kiichi Nakai - "When the Last Sword Is Drawn"; Shinobu Terajima- "Akame 48 Waterfalls"; Kōichi Satō (actor) - "When the Last Sword Is Drawn"; Eri Fukatsu - "Like Asura"	
28	2005 (Heisei 17)	Best Work Award; Best Director Award; Best Screenplay Award; Best Actor Award; Best Actress; Best Supporting Actor Award; Best Supporting Actress Award	"Half a Confession" (Kiyo Sasabe); Yoichi Sai - "Blood and Bones"; Shinobu Yaguchi - "Swing Girls"; Akira Terao - "Half a Confession"; Kyoka Suzuki - "Blood and Bones"; Odagiri Joe - "Blood and Bones"; Masami Nagasawa - "Crying Out Love in the Center of the World"	Masami Nagasawa, who appeared in Crying Out Love in the Center of the World, won the Best Supporting Actress Award at the age of 17, the youngest in all categories.
29	2006 (Heisei 18)	Best Work Award; Best Director Award; Best Screenplay Award; Best Actor Award; Best Actress; Best Supporting Actor Award; Best Supporting Actress Award	"Always Sanchōme no Yūhi" (Takashi Yamazaki); Takashi Yamazaki - "Always Sanchōme no Yūhi"; Takashi Yamazaki, Ryota Kosawa (古沢良太) - "Always Sanchōme no Yūhi"; Hidetaka Yoshioka -"Always Sanchōme no Yūhi"; Sayuri Yoshinaga - "Year One in the North" (北の零年); Shinichi Tsutsumi - "Always Sanchōme no Yūhi"; Hiroko Yakushimaru - "Always Sanchōme no Yūhi"	Always Sanchōme no Yūhi achieved 12 crowns, in line with The Twilight Samurai at the 26th ceremony.
30	2007 (Heisei 19)	Best Work Award; Best Animation Award; Best Director Award; Best Screenplay Award; Best Actor Award; Best Actress; Best Supporting Actor Award; Best Supporting Actress Award	"Hula Girls" (Lee Sang-il) "The Girl Who Leapt Through Time" (Mamoru Hosoda); Lee Sang-il - "Hula Girls"; Lee Sang-il, Daisuke Habara - "Hula Girls"; Ken Watanabe - "Memories of Tomorrow"; Miki Nakatani - "Memories of Matsuko"; Takashi Sasano - "Love and Honor"; Yū Aoi - "Hula Girls"	The animation division was newly established at this time, and The Girl Who Leapt Through Time became the first award-winning work after its establishment. Takuya Kimura, of Love and Honor, declined the Best Actor Award. In addition, Hula Girls (production / distribution: Cinekanon) won the Best Film Award, the first since Zigeunerweisen (4th ceremony) as an independent production and distribution.
31	2008 (Heisei 20)	Best Work Award; Best Animation Award; Best Director Award; Best Screenplay Award; Best Actor Award; Best Actress; Best Supporting Actor Award; Best Supporting Actress Award	"Tokyo Tower: Mom and Me, and Sometimes Dad" (Joji Matsuoka) "Tekkonkinkreet" (Michael Arias); Joji Matsuoka - "Tokyo Tower: Mom and Me, and Sometimes Dad"; Suzuki Matsuo - "Tokyo Tower: Mom and Me, and Sometimes Dad"; Hidetaka Yoshioka - "Always Zoku Sanchōme no Yūhi"; Kirin Kiki - "Tokyo Tower: Mom and Me, and Sometimes Dad"; Kaoru Kobayashi - "Tokyo Tower: Mom and Me, and Sometimes Dad"; Masako Motai - "I Just Didn't Do It"	Tokyo Tower: Mom and Me, and Sometimes Dad won several awards at this ceremony. In an interview with Kirin Kiki in the magazine En-Taxi she said "I was not enough work to win the award", "I did not agree with the director from the time of shooting, I did not feel good work was completed", objection to the favorable evaluation of this work and each prize winning.
32	2009 (Heisei 21)	Best Work Award; Best Animation Award; Best Director Award; Best Screenplay Award; Best Actor Award; Best Actress; Best Supporting Actor Award; Best Supporting Actress Award	"Departures" (Yōjirō Takita) "Ponyo" (Hayao Miyazaki); Yōjirō Takita - "Departures"; Kundō Koyama - "Departures"; Masahiro Motoki - "Departures"; Tae Kimura - "All Around Us"; Tsutomu Yamazaki - "Departures"; Kimiko Yo - "Departures"	
33	2010 (Heisei 22)	Best Work Award; Best Animation Award; Best Director Award; Best Screenplay Award; Best Actor Award; Best Actress; Best Supporting Actor Award; Best Supporting Actress Award	"Shizumanu Taiyō" (Setsurō Wakamatsu) "Summer Wars" (Mamoru Hosoda); Daisaku Kimura - "Mt. Tsurugidake"; Miwa Nishikawa - "Dear Doctor"; Ken Watanabe - "Shizumanu Taiyō"; Takako Matsu - "Villon's Wife"; Teruyuki Kagawa - "Mt. Tsurugidake"; Kimiko Yo - "Dear Doctor"	Prime Minister Yukio Hatoyama attended the award ceremony, the first active prime minister to do so. He gave a speech about the management restructuring issue of Japan Airlines, which was the model of the work that won the Best Film Award.
34	2011 (Heisei 23)	Best Work Award; Best Animation Award; Best Director Award; Best Screenplay Award; Best Actor Award; Best Actress; Best Supporting Actor Award; Best Supporting Actress Award	"Confessions" (Tetsuya Nakashima) "Arrietty" (Hiromasa Yonebayashi); Tetsuya Nakashima - "Confessions"; Tetsuya Nakashima - "Confessions"; Satoshi Tsumabuki - "Villain"; Eri Fukatsu - "Villain"; Akira Emoto - "Villain"; Kirin Kiki - "Villain"	
35	2012 (Heisei 24)	Best Work Award; Best Animation Award; Best Director Award; Best Screenplay Award; Best Actor Award; Best Actress; Best Supporting Actor Award; Best Supporting Actress Award	"Rebirth" (Izuru Narushima) "From Up on Poppy Hill" (Gorō Miyazaki); Izuru Narushima - "Rebirth"; Satoko Okudera - "Rebirth"; Yoshio Harada - "Someday"; Mao Inoue - "Rebirth"; Denden - "Cold Fish"; Hiromi Nagasaku - "Rebirth"	Since this time was the start of stereophonic broadcasting with terrestrial digital broadcasting of the NTV series. The deceased Yoshio Harada won Best Actor at the award ceremony.
36	2013 (Heisei 25)	Best Work Award; Best Animation Award; Best Director Award; Best Screenplay Award; Best Actor Award; Best Actress; Best Supporting Actor Award; Best Supporting Actress Award	"The Kirishima Thing" (Daihachi Yoshida) "Wolf Children" (Mamoru Hosoda); Daihachi Yoshida - "The Kirishima Thing"; Kenji Uchida - "The Kirishima Thing"; Hiroshi Abe - "Thermae Romae"; Kirin Kiki - "Chronicle of My Mother"; Hideji Ōtaki - "Anata e" Kimiko Yo - "Anata e"	
37	2014 (Heisei 26)	Best Work Award; Best Animation Award; Best Director Award; Best Screenplay Award; Best Actor Award; Best Actress; Best Supporting Actor Award; Best Supporting Actress Award	"The Great Passage" (Yuya Ishii) "The Wind Rises" (Hayao Miyazaki); Yuya Ishii - "The Great Passage"; Kensaku Watanabe - "The Great Passage"; Ryuhei Matsuda - "The Great Passage"; Yōko Maki - "The Ravine of Goodbye"; Lily Franky - "Like Father, Like Son"; Yōko Maki - "Like Father, Like Son"	The Great Passage received 6 crowns. In addition, Yoko Maki won the Best Actress Award for The Ravine of Goodbye and the Supporting Actress Award for Like Father, Like Son.
38	2015 (Heisei 27)	Best Work Award; Best Animation Award; Best Director Award; Best Screenplay Award; Best Actor Award; Best Actress; Best Supporting Actor Award; Best Supporting Actress Award	"The Eternal Zero" (Takashi Yamazaki) "Stand by Me Doraemon" (Takashi Yamazaki); Takashi Yamazaki - "The Eternal Zero"; Akihiro Dobashi (土橋章宏) - "Samurai Hustle"; Junichi Okada - "The Eternal Zero"; Rie Miyazawa - "Pale Moon"; Junichi Okada - "A Samurai Chronicle"; Haru Kuroki - "The Little House"	The Eternal Zero received 8 crowns. Additionally, Junichi Okada won Best Actor for The Eternal Zero and Best Supporting Actor for A Samurai Chronicle.
39	2016 (Heisei 28)	Best Work Award; Best Animation Award; Best Director Award; Best Screenplay Award; Best Actor Award; Best Actress; Best Supporting Actor Award; Best Supporting Actress Award	"Our Little Sister" (Hirokazu Kore-eda) "The Boy and the Beast" (Mamoru Hosoda); Hirokazu Kore-eda - "Our Little Sister " Shin Adachi (足立紳) - "100 Yen Love"; Kazunari Ninomiya - "Nagasaki: Memories of My Son"; Sakura Ando - "100 Yen Love"; Masahiro Motoki - "The Emperor in August"; Haru Kuroki - "Nagasaki: Memories of My Son"	
40	2017 (Heisei 29)	Best Work Award; Best Animation Award; Best Director Award; Best Screenplay Award; Best Actor Award; Best Actress; Best Supporting Actor Award; Best Supporting Actress Award	"Shin Godzilla" (Hideaki Anno and Shinji Higuchi) "In This Corner of the World" (Sunao Katabuchi); Hideaki Anno and Shinji Higuchi - "Shin Godzilla"; Makoto Shinkai - "Your Name"; Kōichi Satō - "64: Part I"; Rie Miyazawa - "Her Love Boils Bathwater"; Satoshi Tsumabuki - "Rage"; Hana Sugisaki - "Her Love Boils Bathwater"	Shin Godzilla achieved 7 crowns. At this ceremony, for the first time, an animation work (Your Name) won the Best Screenplay Award.
41	2018 (Heisei 30)	Best Work Award; Best Animation Award; Best Director Award; Best Screenplay Award; Best Actor Award; Best Actress; Best Supporting Actor Award; Best Supporting Actress Award	"The Third Murder" (Hirokazu Kore-eda) "The Night Is Short, Walk On Girl" (Masaaki Yuasa); Hirokazu Kore-eda - "The Third Murder"; Hirokazu Kore-eda - "The Third Murder"; Masaki Suda - "Wilderness: Part One"; Yū Aoi - "Birds Without Names"; Kōji Yakusho - "The Third Murder"; Suzu Hirose - "The Third Murder"	The Third Murder achieved 6 crowns, including three for director Hirokazu Kore-eda (Best Director, Best Screenplay and Best Editing).
42	2019 (Heisei 31 / Reiwa 1)	Best Work Award; Best Animation Award; Best Director Award; Best Screenplay Award; Best Actor Award; Best Actress; Best Supporting Actor Award; Best Supporting Actress Award	"Shoplifters" (Hirokazu Kore-eda) "Mirai" (Mamoru Hosoda); Hirokazu Kore-eda - "Shoplifters"; Hirokazu Kore-eda - "Shoplifters"; Kōji Yakusho - "The Blood of Wolves"; Sakura Ando - "Shoplifters"; Tori Matsuzaka - "The Blood of Wolves"; Kirin Kiki - "Shoplifters"	
43	2020 (Reiwa 2)	Best Work Award; Best Animation Award; Best Director Award; Best Screenplay Award; Best Actor Award; Best Actress; Best Supporting Actor Award; Best Supporting Actress Award	"The Journalist" (Michihito Fujii) "Weathering with You" (Makoto Shinkai); Hideki Takeuchi - "Fly Me to the Saitama"; Yūichi Tokunaga - "Fly Me to the Saitama"; Tori Matsuzaka - "The Journalist"; Shim Eun-kyung - "The Journalist"; Ryo Yoshizawa - "Kingdom"; Masami Nagasawa - "Kingdom"	
44	2021 (Reiwa 3)	Best Work Award; Best Animation Award; Best Director Award; Best Screenplay Award; Best Actor Award; Best Actress Award; Best Supporting Actor Award; Best Supporting Actress Award	"Midnight Swan" (Eiji Uchida) "Demon Slayer: Kimetsu no Yaiba – The Movie: Mugen Train" (Haruo Sotozaki); Setsurō Wakamatsu - "Fukushima 50"; Akiko Nogi – "The Voice of Sin"; Tsuyoshi Kusanagi - "Midnight Swan"; Masami Nagasawa – "Mother"; Ken Watanabe - "Fukushima 50"; Haru Kuroki - "The Asadas"	
45	2022 (Reiwa 4)	Best Work Award; Best Animation Award; Best Director Award; Best Screenplay Award; Best Actor Award; Best Actress Award; Best Supporting Actor Award; Best Supporting Actress Award	"Drive My Car" (Ryusuke Hamaguchi) "Evangelion: 3.0+1.0 Thrice Upon a Time" (Hideaki Anno, Kazuya Tsurumaki, Katsuichi Nakayama and Mahiro Maeda); Ryusuke Hamaguchi - "Drive My Car"; Ryusuke Hamaguchi and Takamasa Ōe - "Drive My Car"; Hidetoshi Nishijima - "Drive My Car"; Kasumi Arimura – "We Made a Beautiful Bouquet"; Ryohei Suzuki - "Last of the Wolves"; Kaya Kiyohara - "In The Wake"	
46	2023 (Reiwa 5)	Best Work Award; Best Animation Award; Best Director Award; Best Screenplay Award; Best Actor Award; Best Actress Award; Best Supporting Actor Award; Best Supporting Actress Award	"A Man" (Kei Ishikawa) "The First Slam Dunk" (Takehiko Inoue); Kei Ishikawa - "A Man"; Kōsuke Mukai - "A Man"; Satoshi Tsumabuki - "A Man"; Yukino Kishii - "Small, Slow but Steady"; Masataka Kubota - "A Man"; Sakura Ando - "A Man"	
47	2024 (Reiwa 6)	Best Work Award; Best Animation Award; Best Director Award; Best Screenplay Award; Best Actor Award; Best Actress Award; Best Supporting Actor Award; Best Supporting Actress Award	"Godzilla Minus One" (Takashi Yamazaki) "The Boy and the Heron" (Hayao Miyazaki); Wim Wenders - "Perfect Days"; Takashi Yamazaki - "Godzilla Minus One"; Koji Yakusho - "Perfect Days"; Sakura Ando - "Monster"; Hayato Isomura - "The Moon"; Sakura Ando - "Godzilla Minus One"	
48	2025 (Reiwa 7)	Best Work Award; Best Animation Award; Best Director Award; Best Screenplay Award; Best Actor Award; Best Actress Award; Best Supporting Actor Award; Best Supporting Actress Award	"A Samurai in Time" (Jun'ichi Yasuda) "Look Back" (Kiyotaka Oshiyama); Michihito Fujii – "Faceless"; Akiko Nogi – "Last Mile"; Ryusei Yokohama – "Faceless"; Yuumi Kawai – "A Girl Named Ann"; Takao Osawa – "Kingdom 4: Return of the Great General"; Riho Yoshioka – "Faceless"	
49	2026 (Reiwa 8)	Best Work Award; Best Animation Award; Best Director Award; Best Screenplay Award; Best Actor Award; Best Actress Award; Best Supporting Actor Award; Best Supporting Actress Award	"Kokuho" (Lee Sang-il) "Demon Slayer: Kimetsu no Yaiba – The Movie: Infinity Castle" (Haruo Sotozaki); Lee Sang-il – "Kokuho"; Satoko Okudera – "Kokuho"; Ryo Yoshizawa – "Kokuho"; Chieko Baisho – "Tokyo Taxi"; Jiro Sato – "Suzuki=Bakudan"; Misato Morita – "Night Flower"	
