= Wuthering Heights (1988 film) =

1988 Japanese film

- Film poster
- Directed by: Yoshishige Yoshida
- Written by: Yoshishige Yoshida
- Based on: Wuthering Heights by Emily Brontë
- Produced by: Kazunobu Yamaguchi; Francis von Büren
- Starring: Yūsaku Matsuda; Yūko Tanaka; Rentarō Mikuni; Tatsuo Nadaka; Eri Ishida
- Cinematography: Jun'ichirō Hayashi
- Edited by: Takao Shirae
- Music by: Tōru Takemitsu
- Production companies: Mediactuel; Seiyu
- Distributed by: Toho
- Release date: 28 May 1988 (Japan)
- Running time: 143 minutes
- Country: Japan
- Language: Japanese

Wuthering Heights (Japanese: 嵐が丘, Hepburn: Arashi ga oka) is a 1988 Japanese Gothic jidaigeki drama film written and directed by Yoshishige Yoshida. It is based on the 1847 novel of the same name by Emily Brontë, with the setting transplanted to the Muromachi period of medieval Japan. Yoshida's film adapts both halves of the novel, unlike other adaptations. Wuthering Heights was a French-Swiss-Japanese co-production, and shown in competition at the 1988 Cannes Film Festival where it was nominated for the Palme d'Or. The film stars Yūsaku Matsuda, in one of his final performances, as Onimaru (Heathcliff) and Yūko Tanaka as Kinu (Catherine), alongside Rentarō Mikuni, Tatsuo Nadaka and Eri Ishida. Toho released the film on May 28, 1988, in Japan.

== Plot ==
A homeless orphan is found under a bridge by Lord Takamaru, patriarch of the wealthy Yamabe family. He takes pity on the child and brings him back to his estate, Higashi-no-sho (Wuthering Heights), a desolate region on volcanic Fire Mountain. Takamaru is a priest who worships a fire god. His family are in charge of conducting Shinto rituals and snake sacrifices to satisfy their god, which they believe prevents the mountain from erupting. However, the house is divided into two clans, with a feud underway between the estate's east (Higashi-no-sho) and west (Nishi-no-sho) mansions.

Takamaru names the adopted child Onimaru, so-called for his "demonic" appearance. He is both apprehensive of the boy's nature and excited by his "boldness." Onimaru is raised alongside the Lord's two children, Hidemaru and Kinu. Hidemaru, entitled and elitist, resents Onimaru for being favored by their father despite his "low-born" status. He treats Onimaru cruelly. Kinu, however, bonds with the boy.

As the years pass, Onimaru grows into a brooding but charismatic man who has fallen in love with his foster sister. Hidemaru, disgusted by Takamaru's continued embrace of Onimaru, leaves for the city. After Kinu has her first period, Takamaru tells her that women of their clan who come of age must serve as priestesses in the capitol. Kinu rejects this familial obligation, desiring to remain on the mountain instead. She proposes marriage to Mitsuhiko, the lord of the west house, a wealthy man who befits her societal stature, to escape her fate. Kinu goes through with the marriage, but not before seducing Onimaru the night before her wedding. Filled with rage and resentment, Onimaru endeavors to gain stewardship of Higashi-no-sho and take back Kinu.

A band of trespassing rōnin murder Takamaru right in front of Onimaru. After receiving news of the death of his father, Hidemaru decides to reclaim his birthright. He has become successful and brings his wife, Shino, and a son, Yoshimaru, back to the house of the east. Though the family discusses the possibility of Onimaru inheriting the estate, Hidemaru arrives and drives him off the land.

A few years later, Kinu is with child. Shino attends Kinu at the birth of her daughter. They give her daughter her name. Kinu contracts an illness due to complications from childbirth, leaving her bedridden. Against the warnings of Mitsuhiko, Shino leaves with a servant to return to the house of the east. During the journey, Shino is waylaid by a group of [[[Rōnin|rōnin]]] bandits, who rape and murder her. Hidemaru becomes a broken alcoholic in the wake of her death, no longer able to fulfill his duties to the fire god. He wanders into the forbidden village, where he, too, is murdered by the locals.

Meanwhile, Onimaru has become a skillful fighter, gaining the Shogun's favor and a local lordship in the process. He reappears in the village as Hidemaru is attacked by the locals. With his death, Onimaru finally gains control of Higashi-no-sho. He travels to the west house, over which he is also lord, still obsessed with Kinu. Mitsuhiko turns him away, not allowing him to see Kinu, who is still ill. Kinu discovers he has come to visit and warns Mitsuhiko of the grave danger Onimaru poses, now more than ever.

Mitsuhiko's sister Tae proposes a marriage between herself and Onimaru. He takes her to the house of the east, but to work as a slave, demanding she stay in the forbidden room.

As Kinu lays dying due to her illness, surrounded by husband and child, she promises to drag Onimaru to hell. She dies and is buried. Onimaru, haunted by her memory, exhumes her corpse.

Tae propositions Onimaru again, saying that his intense jealousy of Mitsuhiko proves he is "more man than demon." Onimaru takes her words poorly and, in his rage, assaults her. Afterwards, Tae commits suicide by hanging in the gate of the east house.

Years later, the Nishi-no-sho clan of the west house is attacked by bandits, and Onimaru, who shows up just in time to finish them off, finds Mitsuhiko mortally injured in the fray. He chooses to take his own life after being denied a mercy killing by Onimaru. Mitsuhiko's daughter Kinu, now a young woman, survives, and decides to move to the house of the east, where her cousin Yoshimaru lives.

It is revealed that Onimaru vengefully exploits Yoshimaru, treating him as little more than an indentured servant. Kinu attempts to speak with Yoshimaru but is initially ignored. Onimaru, who rules the estate with an iron fist, is aging and maddened by an unanswerable love for Kinu's mother. Yoshimaru and Kinu eventually fall for each other, and Yoshimaru reveals that he is filled with ire for his oppressive uncle.

The final straw occurs when Onimaru brings the coffin containing Kinu's remains to Higashi-no-sho, intending to have sex with her. Kinu hides her mother's bones and lies in wait for Onimaru in the empty coffin. This enrages Onimaru, who pursues her. Kinu attempts to provoke Yoshimaru into killing Onimaru by allowing herself to be beaten naked by him in the courtyard. However, Onimaru acknowledges this plot and Yoshimaru declines, vowing to bide his time and kill Onimaru later.

On the night of the sacrifice to the fire god, Onimaru, taking on the appearance of the snake demon to perform the sacrifice, rushes out to the gates. Yoshimaru, sensing an opportunity, runs after him. He is gifted the sword meant to kill the snake by Kinu. He confronts Onimaru, and in the fight, Yoshimaru cuts off Onimaru's right hand. Figuring he is mortally wounded already and taking pity, Yoshimaru leaves him wallowing and wailing for Kinu's mother, his love.

Feeling victorious, Yoshimaru returns to the house of the east for Kinu, who has prepared to kill herself if he did not return. They plan to marry and leave for Nishi-no-sho to rebury Kinu's mother. They fasten her coffin atop a horse. The horse runs off and Onimaru takes the reins, stealing the coffin. As Fire Mountain erupts, Onimaru takes the coffin into the crater, disappearing into its fiery maw.

== Cast ==
- Yūsaku Matsuda as Onimaru
- Yūko Tanaka as Kinu Yamabe
- Rentarō Mikuni as Lord Takamaru
- Tatsuo Nadaka as Mitsuhiko
- Eri Ishida as Tae
- Nagare Hagiwara as Hidemaru
- Keiko Itō as Shino
- Masato Furuoya as Yoshimaru
- Tomoko Takabe as Kinu, daughter
- Masao Imafuku as Ichi
- Shin Ueda as Suka
- Taro Shigaki
- Tokuko Sugiyama
- Shun Ueda
- Mansaku Fuwa
- Ken Osawa
- Fumihiko Tsuburaya
- Hirokazu Inoue

== Background ==
In a 2009 interview, Yoshida stated, "Then I made Wuthering Heights... as pure cinema, just as a cinematic challenge." Yoshida also said that his adaptation, "owes as much to Georges Bataille as to Emily Brontë."

== Critical analysis ==
According to Film at Lincoln Center, Yoshida's adaptation is "a powerfully stark, elemental take on the story." They also describe it as expressionistic, "savage" and "[approaching] primeval horror".

Hayley Scanlon of Windows on Worlds stated, "Yoshida’s vision is darker, more disturbing than that of the big budget epics which aimed to recapture golden age glories." She described the story as one of generational trauma and classism, also writing, "Yoshida’s Wuthering Heights is less a story of forbidden, transgressive loves than it is of elemental destruction, the anger of the gods manifested as imploded repression and its fiery aftermath."

Dana Reinoos, writing for Screen Slate, described the film as an "unruly" outlier in Yoshida's filmography. Reinoos states that, though the film is an adaptation, "Yoshida pulls and molds the novel’s essence until it is a thoroughly Japanese film," emphasizing the desolate setting, Takemitsu's score of Japanese flutes, taiko drums and biwa, and the "purposeful physical movements and barren set design reminiscent of traditional Noh theater." Reinoos concluded that Yoshida's adaptation is surprising to fans of the director as well as fans of the novel, and that "Yoshida audaciously mixes Gothic romance, Japanese tradition, and French philosophy into an otherworldly swirl of ghosts, blood, and romance from beyond the grave."

== Awards and nominations ==
41st Cannes Film Festival

- Nominated: Palme d'Or

13th Hochi Film Awards

- Won: Best Supporting Actress (Eri Ishida, also won for A Chaos of Flowers and Hope and Pain)

12th Japan Academy Awards

- Won: Outstanding Performance by an Actress in a Supporting Role (Eri Ishida, also won for A Chaos of Flowers and Hope and Pain)
- Nominated: Outstanding Performance by an Actor in a Leading Role (Yūsaku Matsuda)

43rd Mainichi Film Awards

- Won: Best Cinematography (Jun'ichirō Hayashi, also won for Kyōshū)
