= Baishō =

Baishō, Baisho or Baishou (written 倍賞) is a Japanese surname. Notable people with the surname include:

- Chieko Baisho (born 1941), Japanese actress and singer
- Mitsuko Baisho (born 1946), Japanese actress
