= Mangetsu no Kuchizuke =

Mangetsu no Kuchizuke (Kiss on Full Moon)
- Film poster
- 満月のくちづけ
- Directed by: Ryū Kaneda
- Starring: Eri Fukatsu
- Release date: April 8, 1989
- Running time: 92 minutes
- Country: Japan
- Language: Japanese

Mangetsu no Kuchizuke (満月のくちづけ(Kiss On Full Moon)) is a 1989 Japanese horror film directed by Ryū Kaneda and starring Eri Fukatsu. It was released in Japan on April 8, 1989.

== Cast ==
- Eri Fukatsu
- Yasufumi Terawaki
- Akiko Matsumura
- Tomoko Kawashima
- Terumi Yamamoto
- Akemi Imamura

== Reception ==
At the 13th Japan Academy Prize, Eri Fukatsu won the award for Best Newcomer. At the 1989 Fantafestival, Ryū Kaneda won the award for Best Director and Eri Fukatsu won the award for Best Actress.
