= Eri Fukatsu =

Japanese actress

- 深津 絵里
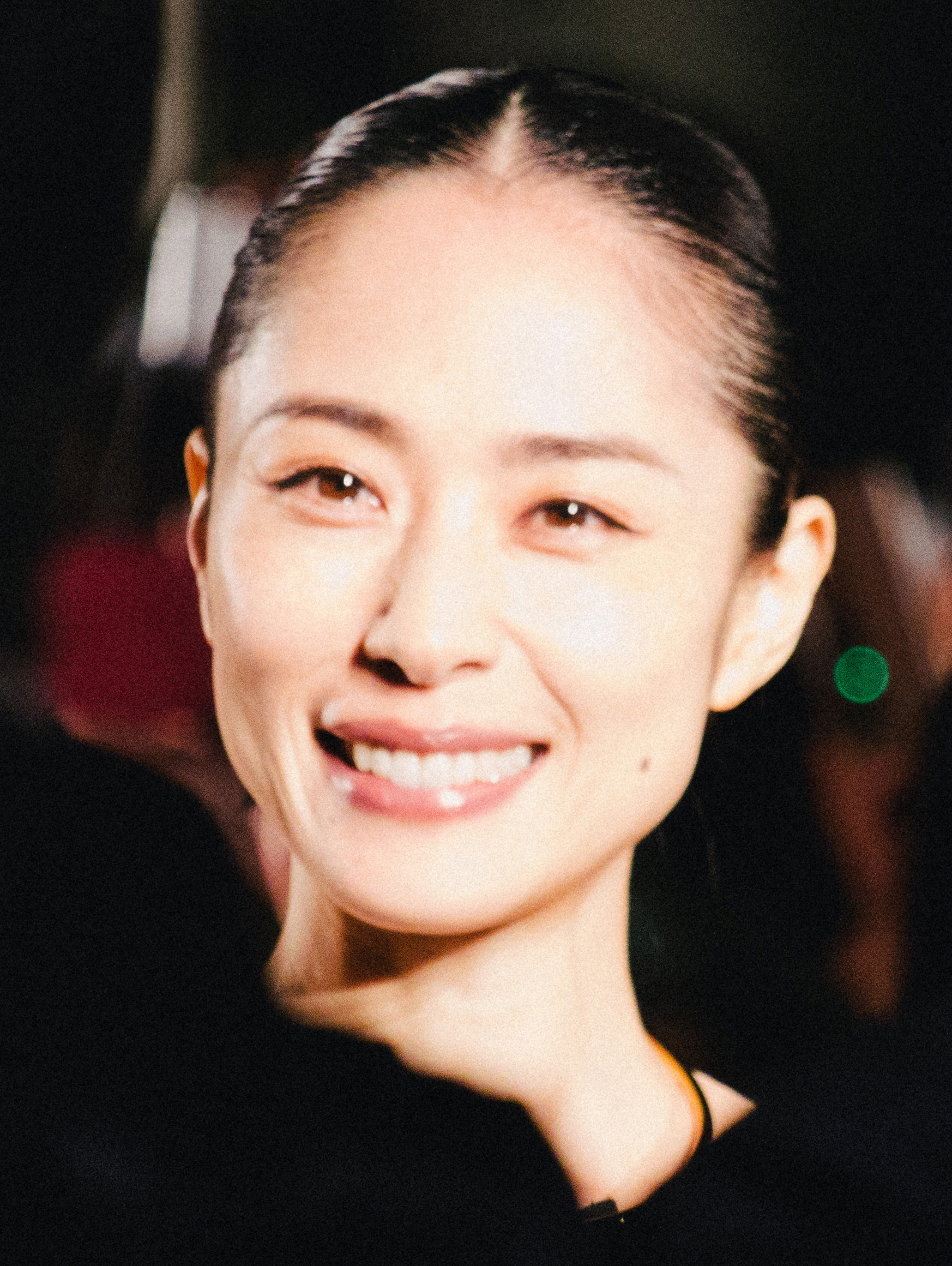
- Fukatsu in 2014
- Born: January 11, 1973 (age 53); Ōita, Ōita Prefecture, Japan
- Occupation: Actress
- Years active: 1988–present
- Website: Official Site

Eri Fukatsu (深津 絵里, Fukatsu Eri; born January 11, 1973) is a Japanese actress. She won the award for best actress at the 18th Yokohama Film Festival for Haru and the best actress award at the 2010 Montreal World Film Festival for her performance in Villain. She also received acclaim for her role in the Japanese TV series Bayside Shakedown and the subsequent spin-off films of the series. In 1988, she starred in "Christmas Express" commercials for the Central Japan Railway Company.

== Career ==
In her early years in Japan's entertainment business, Eri Fukatsu worked as a singer under the names Rie Mizuhara and Rie Takahara, but later decided to use her real name. In 1988 she made her screen debut in the film adaptation of Tōma no Shinzō, entitled Summer Vacation 1999. Among her television credits, Eri Fukatsu also provides narration for the long-running "World Heritage Sites" program on Japanese television.

In 1997, Fukatsu took the role of Sumire Onda in the Bayside Shakedown television series. She co-starred with Satoshi Tsumabuki in Lee Sang-il's 2010 film Villain, for which she won the Best Actress award at the 34th Montreal World Film Festival. In 2011, she starred in Kōki Mitani's A Ghost of a Chance.

== Filmography ==
=== Films ===
Year	Title	Role	Notes	Ref.
1988	Summer Vacation 1999	Norio	as Rie Mizuhara	
1988	Stay Gold	Risa	as Rie Mizuhara	
1989	Kiss to Moonlight	Rie Takahara	Lead role	
1991	Manatsu no Chikyū	Yūko Hashimoto	Lead role	
1995	Birthday Present	Eri Kawano		
1996	Haru	Hoshi	Lead role	
1998	Bayside Shakedown: The Movie	Sumire Onda		
2000	Space Travelers	Midori Aida ("Irene Bear")		
2003	Bayside Shakedown 2	Sumire Onda		
2003	Like Asura	Takiko		
2006	The Professor's Beloved Equation	Kyōko		
2007	The Adventures of Super Monkey	Tang Sanzang		
2008	The Magic Hour	Mari Takachiho		
2008	Honokaa Boy	Chaco		
2009	Your Story	Natsumi Takahara	Lead role	
2010	Bayside Shakedown 3	Sumire Onda		
2010	Villain	Mitsuyo Magome	Lead role	
2011	A Ghost of a Chance	Emi Hōshō	Lead role	
2012	Bayside Shakedown The Final	Sumire Onda		
2014	Parasyte: Part 1	Ryoko Tamiya		
2015	Parasyte: Part 2	Ryoko Tamiya		
2015	Journey to the Shore	Mizuki Yabuuchi	Lead role	
2016	The Long Excuse	Natsuko Kinugasa		
2017	Survival Family	Mitsue Suzuki		
2022	Suzume	Tamaki Iwato (voice)		
2025	Gosh!!	Yayoi Hagoromo		

=== Television ===
Year	Title	Role	Notes	Ref.
1990	Yobikō Boogie	Mayumi Shimaoka		
1990	Paradise Nippon	Sanae Fujii	Lead role	
1991	High School Daidassō	Tsugumi Kurita		
1991	Ruju no Dengon		Lead role; episode 5	
1992	In the Name of Love			
1992	Yonimo Kimyō na Monogatari: Door			
1992	Natsu no Yoru no Rusuban			
1992	Hatachi no Yakusoku			
1993	Kekkonshiki			
1993	Akuma no Kiss			
1993	Otona no Kiss			
1994	Kono Ai ni Ikite			
1994	Wakamono no Subete			
1995	Saikō no Kataomoi	Kurumi Katō	Lead role	
1995	Best Friend			
1996	Naniwa Kin'yūdō: Part 1			
1996	Tōmei Ningen: Dead Zone in Zeus			
1997	Bayside Shakedown	Sumire Onda		
1997	Bara no Satsui: Kyomu eno Kumotsu			
1997	Narita Rikon			
1998	Tokugawa Yoshinobu	Tenshō-in Atsuhime	Taiga drama	
1998	Kirakira Hikaru	Hikaru Amano	Lead role	
1998	Wangansho Fukei Monogatari: Shoka no Kōtsuu Anzen Special	Sumire Onda	Television film	
1998	Odoru Daisousasen: Aki no Hanzai Bokumetsu Special	Sumire Onda	Television film	
1999	Kanojotachi no Jidai		Lead role	
2000	Tenkiyohō no Koibito			
2001	Kabachitare!	Chiharu	Lead role	
2001	Chūshingura 1/47	Horibe Hori	Television film	
2002	Power of Love	Tōko Motomiya	Lead role	
2002	Hundred Million Stars From the Sky	Yūko Dōjima		
2003	The Eldest Boy and His Three Elder Sisters	Haruko	Lead role	
2003	Kawa, Itsuka Umi e: Muttsu no Ai no Monogatari	Tami	Lead role	
2005	Slow Dance	Isaki Makino	Lead role	
2006	Adventures of the Super Monkey: Journey to the West	Xuanzang		
2007	Fukatsu Eri no Black Comedy: Blacome	Various	Lead role	
2008	Change	Rika Miyama		
2008	The Naminori Restaurant	Ami	Episode 33	
2009	Ekiro	Keiko Fukumura	Television film	
2020	Saigo no Onna	Sayuri Minagawa	Television film	
2021–22	Come Come Everybody	Rui	Lead role; Asadora	

== Discography ==
Albums

- Applause (1990)
- Sourire (1992)
- Dokuichigo (2012) (as Ichigo Ichie)

Singles

- "Yokohama Joke" (1988)
- "Nanatsu no Namida" (1989)
- "Approach" (1989)
- "Hitori-zutsu no Futari" (1992)
- "Ai wa Suteki, Ai wa Hanataba" (1992)

== Photobooks ==
- Sobacasu (1989)

== Awards and nominations ==
Year	Award	Category	Work(s)	Result	Ref.
1990	13th Japan Academy Film Prize	Newcomers of the Year	Mangetsu no Kuchizuke	Won	
1997	18th Yokohama Film Festival	Best Actress	Haru	Won	
1997	20th Japan Academy Film Prize	Best Actress	Haru	Nominated	
1999	22nd Japan Academy Film Prize	Best Supporting Actress	Bayside Shakedown: The Movie	Nominated	
2002	5th Nikkan Sports Drama Grand Prix	Best Actress	Koi no Chikara	Won	
2003	28th Hochi Film Awards	Best Supporting Actress	Like Asura, Bayside Shakedown 2	Won	
2004	27th Japan Academy Film Prize	Best Supporting Actress	Like Asura	Won	
2004	27th Japan Academy Film Prize	Best Supporting Actress	Bayside Shakedown 2	Nominated	
2007	16th Japanese Movie Critics Awards	Best Actress	The Professor's Beloved Equation	Won	
2010	34th Montreal World Film Festival	Best Actress	Villain	Won	
2010	35th Hochi Film Awards	Best Actress	Villain	Won	
2010	23rd Nikkan Sports Film Awards	Best Actress	Villain	Won	
2011	34th Japan Academy Film Prize	Best Actress	Villain	Won	
2012	35th Japan Academy Film Prize	Best Actress	A Ghost of a Chance	Nominated	
2016	89th Kinema Junpo Awards	Best Actress	Journey to the Shore, Parasyte: Part 2	Won	
2016	30th Takasaki Film Festival	Best Actress	Journey to the Shore	Won	
