= A Distant Cry from Spring =

- Film poster

Japanese name
- Kanji: 遙かなる山の呼び声
Transcriptions
- Revised Hepburn: Harukanaru yama no Yobigoe
- Directed by: Yoji Yamada
- Written by: Yoji Yamada; Yoshitaka Asama
- Produced by: Kiyoshi Shimazu
- Starring: Ken Takakura; Chieko Baisho; Hidetaka Yoshioka
- Cinematography: Tetsuo Takaha
- Edited by: Iwao Ishii
- Music by: Masaru Sato
- Production company: Shochiku
- Distributed by: Shochiku
- Release dates: 15 March 1980 (Japan); 17 October 1980 (United States)
- Running time: 124 minutes
- Country: Japan
- Language: Japanese

A Distant Cry from Spring (Japanese: 遙かなる山の呼び声, Hepburn: Haruka naru yama no yobigoe) is a 1980 Japanese drama film co-written and directed by Yoji Yamada. Set amid Hokkaido's rural landscape, it follows a widowed dairy farmer and her son who are transformed by the arrival of a mysterious drifter with a hidden past.

== Plot ==
In the vast, sparsely populated expanses of Hokkaido, Japan, recently widowed Tamiko Kazami (Chieko Baisho) struggles to maintain her small dairy farm while raising her young son, Takeshi (Hidetaka Yoshioka), on her own. The hard rhythms of farm life, such as milking, haying, feeding cows, repairing equipment, fill her every day.

One stormy night, as Tamiko and Takeshi shelter from thunder in their humble farmhouse, a lone stranger named Kōsaku Tajima (Ken Takakura) knocks at the door seeking refuge. Wary but compassionate, Tamiko allows him to sleep in the barn; during the night, Tajima even helps with a cow's calving. At dawn, he thanks them and quietly disappears.

Months later, likely the following spring, Tajima returns, this time requesting work in exchange for food and lodging. Although initially reticent, Tamiko accepts out of necessity. Tajima proves to be a diligent, self-sufficient worker who gradually becomes indispensable to both farm operations and household life. Young Takeshi forms a close bond with him, seeing in Tajima a caring and stabilizing father-figure.

Their relationship grows not through overt romance but through shared labor, quiet companionship, and mutual healing. Tamiko eventually suffers a slipped disc and must be hospitalized, leaving Tajima to manage the farm with the help of a teenage neighbor, which further deepening his bond with Takeshi and proving his reliability. As feelings deepen, Tajima remains reclusive, sleeping in a separate shed and keeping his distance.

Tamiko is pursued by a man from a wealthier farm who appears to want her as a mistress rather than a wife. She rebuffs his advances, and when he returns with his brothers intending to threaten her, Tajima intervenes. His calm yet resolute defense diffuses the confrontation and even transforms the aggressors into allies.

Tajima's past gradually comes to light: he has been on the run, having killed a man who threatened his wife who committed suicide because of it and been fleeing the law for at least two years. This revelation strains the invisible thread binding the characters. Tajima eventually decides to surrender himself to the authorities, acknowledging his responsibility.

On a train where Tajima prepares to leave for custody and prison, an emotional and restrained Tamiko finally voices her feelings for Tajima, telling him she will wait for him after the four-year prison term.

== Cast ==
- Ken Takakura as Kōsaku Tajima
- Chieko Baisho as Tamiko Kazami
- Hidetaka Yoshioka as Takeshi Kazami
- Tetsuya Takeda
- Hajime Hana
- Masanori Hata
- Mizuho Suzuki
- Tappei Shimokawa
- Kiyoshi Atsumi
- Noko Konoha
- Tokuko Sugiyama
- Taijirou Ono
- Yasuhisa Sonoda
- Takuji Aoki
- Gō Awazu
- Kyōichi Satō
- Megumi Otake
- Kazuhiko Kasai
- Seiji Shinohara
- Keiji Tsuchida
- Nobuo Takagi
- Masao Irie

== Awards and nominations ==
5th Hochi Film Awards

- Won: Best Actress - Chieko Baisho

4th Japan Academy Film Prizes

- Won: Best Actor - Ken Takakura (also for Dōran)
- Won: Best Actress - Chieko Baisho (also for Tora-san's Tropical Fever)
- Won: Best Screenplay - Yoji Yamada and Yoshitaka Asama (also for Tora-san's Tropical Fever)
- Won: Best Music Score - Masaru Sato
- Nominated: Best Film
- Nominated: Best Director - Yoji Yamada (also for Tora-san's Tropical Fever)
- Nominated: Best Sound - Hiroshi Nakamura

35th Mainichi Film Awards

- Won: Best Actress - Chieko Baisho

3rd Montreal World Film Festival

- Won: Special Prize of the Jury - Yoji Yamada

== Reception ==
Andrew Saroch of Far East Film compared the film to Minari, as a "heart-warming story with sophistication." He further stated that "as with the best of Japanese cinema, it has that little something indefinable that lifts it above its contemporaries. Another Yamada masterclass." Charles Champlin of Los Angeles Times called the film "a masterful work by a civilized, sensitive and thoughtful craftsman in serene command of his art."
