= Tora-san's Matchmaker =

- Theatrical poster
- Directed by: Yoji Yamada
- Written by: Yoji Yamada; Yoshitaka Asama
- Produced by: Tomiyuki Maruyama; Kiyoshi Shimizu
- Starring: Kiyoshi Atsumi; Keiko Matsuzaka
- Cinematography: Hideyuki Iketani
- Edited by: Iwao Ishii
- Music by: Naozumi Yamamoto
- Distributed by: Shochiku
- Release date: December 25, 1993
- Running time: 103 minutes
- Country: Japan
- Language: Japanese

Tora-san's Matchmaker (男はつらいよ 寅次郎の縁談, Otoko wa Tsurai yo: Torajirō no Endan) is a 1993 Japanese comedy film directed by Yoji Yamada. It stars Kiyoshi Atsumi as Torajirō Kuruma (Tora-san), and Keiko Matsuzaka as his love interest or "Madonna". Tora-san's Matchmaker is the forty-sixth entry in the popular, long-running Otoko wa Tsurai yo series.

== Cast ==
- Kiyoshi Atsumi as Torajirō
- Chieko Baisho as Sakura
- Keiko Matsuzaka as Yoko Sakaide
- Hidetaka Yoshioka as Mitsuo Suwa
- Shimojo Masami as Tatsuzō Kuruma
- Chieko Misaki as Tsune Kuruma (Torajirō's aunt)
- Hisao Dazai as Boss (Umetarō Katsura)
- Gajirō Satō as Genkō
- Keiroku Seki as Ponshū

== Critical appraisal ==
For their work in Tora-san's Matchmaker, the Japan Academy Prize awarded Yoji Yamada for Best Director and Screenplay, Yoshitaka Asama for Best Screenplay, and Isao Suzuki for Best Sound. Also nominated at the Japan Academy Prize were Yutaka Yokoyama and Mitsuo Degawa for Best Sound and Iwao Ishii for Best Editing. The German-language site molodezhnaja gives Tora-san's Matchmaker three and a half out of five stars.

== Availability ==
Tora-san's Matchmaker was released theatrically on December 25, 1993. In Japan, the film was released on videotape in 1994 and 1996, and in DVD format in 2000 and 2008.

== Bibliography ==
=== English ===
- Otoko wa tsurai yo: Torajiro no endan (1993) at IMDb

=== German ===
- "Tora-san's Matchmaker" (in German). www.molodezhnaja.ch.

=== Japanese ===
- 男はつらいよ 寅次郎の縁談 (1993) (in Japanese). allcinema.net.
- "男はつらいよ 寅次郎の縁談". Japanese Cinema Database (Agency for Cultural Affairs). Archived from the original on 2012-03-26.
- 男はつらいよ 寅次郎の縁談 (in Japanese). Japanese Movie Database.
- 男はつらいよ 寅次郎の縁談 (in Japanese). Kinema Junpo. Archived from the original on 2012-03-24.
