= A Last Note =

1995 Japanese film

- Theatrical poster
- Directed by: Kaneto Shindō
- Written by: Kaneto Shindō
- Produced by: Yasuo Ibata; Kiyoshi Mizogami
- Starring: Haruko Sugimura; Nobuko Otowa
- Cinematography: Yoshiyuke Miyake
- Edited by: Yukio Watanabe
- Music by: Hikaru Hayashi
- Production company: Kindai Eiga Kyōkai
- Distributed by: Nihon Herald Eiga
- Release date: 3 June 1995 (Japan)
- Running time: 112 minutes
- Country: Japan
- Language: Japanese

A Last Note (Japanese: 午後の遺言状, Hepburn: Gogo no yuigon-jo) is a 1995 Japanese comedy-drama film directed by Kaneto Shindō. It was the last film of actresses Haruko Sugimura and Nobuko Otowa.

== Plot ==
Yoko, an aged but still active widowed actress, takes a rest from rehearsals and the hot temperature in Tokyo in her rural summer residence. Toyoko, her housemaid of many years, tells her that the 83-year-old gardener committed suicide, leaving behind a note which simply said, "it's over". On his self-made coffin, he had placed a heavy stone from the nearby riverbed, to be used for nailing the coffin's lid.

Later, Yoko receives a phone call by Mr. Ushiguni, who is on a trip with his wife Tomie, an old friend and former theatre troupe colleague of Yoko. Yoko invites them into her house. Tomie is senile and has memory lapses and difficulties to recognise others, but with Yoko's help, she can still recite passages from Chekhov's plays The Seagull and Three Sisters, which they used to perform many years ago.

The next day, an armed man breaks into the house and demands food from the women at gunpoint. Tomie tries to grab his weapon, and moments later, he is arrested by the police. The intruder turns out to be a mentally ill criminal who had attacked residents of an old people's home, driven mad by their incessant playing croquet. Tomie receives a reward for helping to capture the escapee, but when she, her husband, Yoko and Toyoko go out to have lunch in an exclusive restaurant, they are disappointed to find that the envelope she was handed out contains only 10,000 yen rather than the 300,000 yen they had hoped for.

The Ushigunis leave the summer house to continue their journey. After their departure, Toyoko confesses to Yoko that she had an affair with Yoko's husband Saburo while she was on tour 22 years ago, and that Saburo is the father of Toyoko's daughter Akemi. Yoko is indignant at first, and Toyoko leaves the house, but eventually the women settle their dispute. Later, they attend the traditional "tentative marriage" ceremony of Akemi and her future husband Daigoro, a common local man, and watch various stylized costumed dances of sexual rituals.

The next morning, newspaper journalist Naoko visits Yoko's house, telling her that Tomie and her husband committed shinjū in the ocean near Naoetsu, Niigata. Yoko realises that the couple had been on their last journey and that their visit was Tomie's means of saying goodbye. Together with the journalist, Yoko and Toyoko retrace their final steps. Back in her residence, Yoko packs her suitcase to return to Tokyo, instructing Toyoko to keep the gardener's stone for Yoko's coffin in case she should die. After Yoko has left, Toyoko takes the stone to the river and throws it into the water.

== Cast ==
- Haruko Sugimura as Yoko Morimoto
- Nobuko Otowa as Toyoko Yanagawa
- Hideo Kanze as Tohachiro Ushiguni
- Kyoko Asagiri as Tomie Ushiguni
- Toshiyuki Nagashima as Police Officer
- Mitsuko Baisho as Naoko Yazawa
- Yutaka Matsushige as Daigoro
- Tomomi Seo as Akemi
- Katsumi Kiba as Intruder
- Kōichi Ueda as Chief of Police
- Masahiko Tsugawa as Saburo Morimoto
- Masaaki Uchino as Koji Kiyokawa

== Production ==
The house in the mountains was director Shindō's actual mountain retreat, and is the same building as the old man's house in Tree Without Leaves. Shindō's wife Nobuko Otowa was diagnosed with terminal cancer during the production and died in December 1994, prior to the film's release.

== Release ==
Shindō's film was shown in competition at the 19th Moscow International Film Festival in July 1995.

== Legacy ==
A Last Note was screened at a 2012 retrospective on Shindō and Kōzaburō Yoshimura in London, organised by the British Film Institute and the Japan Foundation.

== Awards ==
- 1995 Hochi Film Award for Best Film
- 1996 Japan Academy Film Prize for Best Film, Best Director, Best Screenplay and Best Supporting Actress (Nobuko Otowa)
- 1996 Blue Ribbon Award for Best Film
- 1996 Kinema Junpo Awards for Best Film, Best Director, Best Actress (Haruko Sugimura) and Best Supporting Actress (Nobuko Otowa)
- 1996 Mainichi Film Concours for Best Film, Best Director and Best Actress (Haruko Sugimura)
