= Kumiko Aso =

Japanese actress (born 1978)

Kumiko Asō
- 麻生 久美子
- Born: Kumiko Hiramaru (平丸 久美子); 17 June 1978 (age 48); Sanmu, Chiba, Japan
- Occupation: Actress
- Years active: 1995–present
- Known for: Dr. Akagi; Pulse
- Spouse: Daisuke Iga (m. 2007)
- Children: 2

Kumiko Hiramaru (平丸 久美子, Hiramaru Kumiko; born 17 June 1978 in Sanmu, Chiba, Japan), better known by her stage name Kumiko Asō (麻生 久美子, Asō Kumiko), is a Japanese actress. She is also a model and has participated in several commercials.

== Career ==
In 1995, Asō made her film debut in Bad Guy Beach. With her role in the 1998 film Dr. Akagi, she received several major awards, including a Japan Academy Prize for Best Supporting Actress.

She has appeared in Kiyoshi Kurosawa's films such as License to Live and Pulse. She played a leading role in the 2007 Iranian-Japanese film Hafez.

== Personal life ==
In December 2007, Asō married stylist Daisuke Iga. On 8 May 2012, she gave birth to their first child, a daughter, and her second child, a son, born on 15 November 2016.

== Filmography ==
=== Films ===
- Bad Guy Beach (1995)
- License to Live (1998)
- Dr. Akagi (1998)
- Second Chance (1999)
- Himawari (2000)
- Kaza Hana (2000)
- Ring 0: Birthday (2000)
- Pop Beat Killers (2000)
- Luxurious Bone (2001)
- Red Shadow (2001)
- Rush! (2001)
- Pulse (2001)
- Stereo Future (2001)
- Last Scene (2002)
- 11'9"01 September 11 (2002)
- Inochi (2002)
- Samurai Resurrection (2003)
- Slow Is Beautiful (2003)
- Iden & Tity (2003)
- Casshern (2004)
- Eiko (2004)
- Zebraman (2004)
- Aoi Kuruma (2004)
- Yajikita (2005)
- Hasami Otoko (2005)
- The Uchoten Hotel (2006)
- Hafez (2007)
- Town of Evening Calm, Country of Cherry Blossoms (2007)
- Dororo (2007)
- Cafe Isobe (2008)
- Kodomo no Kodomo (2008)
- Romantic Prelude (2009)
- Beauty (2009)
- Instant Swamp (2009)
- Love Strikes! (2011)
- G'mor Evian! (2012)
- Love & Peace (2015)
- The Boy and the Beast (2015) (voice)
- The Actor (2016)
- Samurai's Promise (2018)
- Mirai (2018), Kyūta's Mother (voice)
- Louder!: Can't Hear What You're Singin', Wimp (2018)
- Fly Me to the Saitama (2019)
- Birthday Wonderland (2019), Midori (voice)
- State of Emergency (2020)
- Masquerade Night (2021)
- Tombi: Father and Son (2022), Misako Ichikawa
- Yes I Can't Swim (2022), Miyako
- Lonely Castle in the Mirror (2022), Kokoro's mother (voice)
- Eternal New Mornings (2023)
- Takano Tofu (2023)
- Last Mile (2024), Yuzuru Kikyo
- Gosh!! (2025)
- Seaside Serendipity (2025)

=== Television ===
- Shinsengumi! (2004), Oryō
- Time Limit Investigator (2006–2019)
- Kaiki Renai Sakusen (2015)
- Dele (2018)
- Idaten (2019), Kikue Tabata
- MIU404 (2020), Yuzuru Kikyo
- Bullets, Bones and Blocked Noses (2021)
- Omusubi (2024–25), Aiko Yoneda
- Chosen Home (2025), Tomoe Kusunoki

=== Japanese dub ===
- Migration (2024), Pam Mallard
- Hexed (2026), Alice Doe

== Awards ==
- 1998: 23rd Hochi Film Award - Best Supporting Actress
- 1998: 1st International Communication Festa - Best Communication Person Award
- 1999: 22nd Japan Academy Prize - Best Supporting Actress
- 1999: 8th Japan Movie Critic Award - Rookie of the year
- 1999: 24th Osaka Film Festival - Rookie of the year
- 1999: 20th Yokohama Film Festival - Rookie of the year
- 2002: 11th Japan Movie Professional Award - Best Actress
- 2002: 16th Takasaki Film Festival - Best Actress Award
- 2007: 32nd Hochi Film Awards - Best Actress
- 2007: 50th Blue Ribbon Awards - Best Actress
- 2007: Mainichi Film Awards - Best Actress
