= Yasuo Furuhata =

Japanese film director (1934–2019)

- Born: 19 August 1934; Matsumoto, Nagano, Japan
- Died: 20 May 2019 (aged 84)
- Occupation: Film director

Yasuo Furuhata (降旗 康男, Furuhata Yasuo; 19 August 1934 – 20 May 2019) was a Japanese film director. He was a director of Toei film company and he often worked with Ken Takakura in such films as Eki and the Shin Abashiri Bangaichi series. He won the 2000 Japan Academy Prize for Director of the Year and 31st International Film Festival of India for Poppoya. He died 20 May 2019.

== Filmography ==
- Hikō Shōjo Yōko (1966)
- Jigoku no okite ni asu wa nai (1966)
- Chōeki jūhachi-nen: Kari shutsugoku (1967)
- King of the Gang (1967)
- Uragiri no ankokugai (1968)
- Prison Boss (1968)
- Gendai Yakuza: Yotamono no Okite (1969)
- Gendai Yakuza: Yotamono Jingi (1969)
- Shin Abashiri Bangaichi: Runin-Masaki no Ketto (1969)
- Brave Red Flower of the North (1970)
- Rise and Fall of Chivalry (1970)
- Sutemi no Narazu-mono (1970)
- Shin Abashiri Bangaichi: Fubuki no Hagure Okami (1970)
- Shin Abashiri Bangaichi: Dai Shinrin no Ketto (1970)
- Gorotsuki Mushuku (1971)
- Shin Abashiri Bangaichi: Fubuki no Dai-Dassou (1971)
- Shin Abashiri Bangaichi: Arashi Yobu Shiretoko-Misaki (1971)
- Shin Abashiri Bangaichi: Arashi Yobu Danpu Jingi (1972)
- Japan's Violent Gangs: Loyalty Offering Murder (1972)
- Iro ma (1973)
- Shikimao Okami (1973)
- Yoru no Enka: Shinobikoi (1974)
- Winter's Flower (1978)
- Honjitsu Tadaima Tanjō (1979)
- Nihon no Fixer (1979)
- Waga Seishun no Eleven (1979)
- Eki (1981)
- Shikake-nin Baian (1981)
- Izakaya Chōji (1983)
- Yasha (1985)
- Time of Wickedness (1985)
- Wakarenu Riyū (1987)
- Shogun's Shadow (1989)
- Buddies (1989)
- Yakuza Ladies 3 (1989)
- Isan Sōzoku, also known as Estate Inheritance (1990)
- Tasmania Monogatari (1990)
- Don ni Natta Otoko (1991)
- Kantsubaki (1992)
- Yakuza Ladies Revisited: Love is Hell (1994)
- Kura (1995)
- Gendai Ninkyoden (1997)
- Poppoya (1999)
- The Firefly (2001)
- Akai Tsuki (2004)
- Riding Alone for Thousands of Miles (2005)
- The Haunted Samurai (2007)
- Anata e (2012)
- A Boy Called H (2013)
- Reminiscences (2017)
