= Eri Ishida =

Japanese actress (born 1960)

- Born: November 9, 1960 (age 65); Yatsushiro, Kumamoto, Japan
- Occupation: Actress
- Years active: 1976–present

Eri Ishida (石田 えり, Ishida Eri) is a Japanese actress. She won the award for best supporting actress at the 14th Japan Academy Awards for Tsuribaka Nisshi 2, Tsuribaka Nisshi 3 and Tobu yume o shibaraku minai. She also won in that same category at the 9th Yokohama Film Festival for Chōchin and at the 13th Hochi Film Award for A Chaos of Flowers, Hope and Pain and Wuthering Heights.

== Filmography ==
=== Films ===
- Double Bed (1983)
- Lanterns on Blue Waters (1983)
- Tokei – Adieu l'hiver (1986)
- Chōchin (1987)
- Tsuribaka Nisshi (1988)
- A Chaos of Flowers (1988)
- Hope and Pain (1988)
- Wuthering Heights (1988)
- Tsuribaka Nisshi 2 (1989)
- Aya (1990)
- Tobu yume o shibaraku minai (1990)
- Tsuribaka Nisshi 3 (1990)
- Female (2005)
- Gina K (2005)
- Route 225 (2006)
- Sad Vacation (2007)
- Bloody Snake Under the Sun (2007)
- Then Summer Came (2008)
- Acacia (2009)
- Shibuya (2010)
- Chips (2012)
- My House (2012)
- It Comes (2018)
- Lost Girls & Love Hotels (2020)
- Snake Eyes (2021)
- Remember to Breathe (2022)
- Watashi no Mita Sekai (2025), Kazuko Fukuda
- Principal Examination (2025), Takamori

=== Television ===
- Ultraman 80 (1980 - 1981), Emi Jouno / Android Emi
- Tobu ga Gotoku (1990), Aikana
