= Love Letter (1985 film) =

Japanese name
- Kanji: 恋文
Transcriptions
- Revised Hepburn: Koibumi
- Directed by: Tatsumi Kumashiro
- Starring: Kenichi Hagiwara; Mitsuko Baisho
- Release date: 1985
- Country: Japan
- Language: Japanese

Love Letter (恋文, Koibumi) is a 1985 Japanese film directed by Tatsumi Kumashiro.

== Cast ==
- Kenichi Hagiwara
- Mitsuko Baisho
- Tomoyoshi Wada
- Keiko Takahashi
- Kaoru Kobayashi
- Noboru Nakaya
- Tokie Hidari
- Isao Hashizume
- Eiichi Kudo

== Awards and nominations ==
10th Hochi Film Award

- Won: Best Actress - Mitsuko Baisho
