= Edo Porn =

1981 Japanese film

- Theatrical release poster
- Directed by: Kaneto Shindō
- Written by: Kaneto Shindō
- Based on: Hokusai manga; by Seiichi Yashiro
- Produced by: Gakubun Akashi; Hiroyuki Nakajo
- Starring: Ken Ogata; Toshiyuki Nishida
- Cinematography: Keiji Maruyama
- Edited by: Yoshi Sugihara
- Music by: Hikaru Hayashi
- Production company: Shochiku
- Distributed by: Shochiku; Fuji Film
- Release date: 12 September 1981 (Japan)
- Running time: 119 minutes
- Country: Japan
- Language: Japanese

Edo Porn (Japanese: 北斎漫画, romanized: Hokusai manga) is a 1981 Japanese biographical drama film written and directed by Kaneto Shindō. It is based on Seiichi Yashiro's stage play on the life of Japanese artist Hokusai.

== Plot ==
Tetsuzō is an unsuccessful ukiyo-e (woodblock) painter who lives in poverty with his daughter Ōei over a geta shop owned by Ōyaku, the older wife of the aspirant writer Sashichi, who is a childhood friend of Tetsuzō.

Tetsuzō lives by borrowing money from his adoptive father, mirror-maker Nakajima Ise. One day, he meets a young, beautiful prostitute named Ōnao and becomes fascinated with her. He produces a series of drawings of her, but later leaves her to Nakajima as a concubine. Ōnao, a sadist with a traumatic past, psychologically torments Nakajima until he hangs himself, and leaves.

After Ōyaku dies, Sashichi, adopting the pen name Bakin, devotes his life to writing and ignores Ōei's advances who has intimate feelings for him. Nevertheless, Ōei continues to love him, withdrawing to celibacy.

Years later and after hard-earned fame, Tetsuzō (now Hokusai) is 89. He lives by painting Ichimatsu dolls with Ōei. One day, Ōei finds a peasant girl who looks like Ōnao. After he sees a young ama (pearl diver) playing with a dead octopus, Hokusai persuades the girl to pose for the shunga (erotic art) of an ama engaged in a threesome with two octopuses.

== Cast ==
- Ken Ogata as Tetsuzō (Hokusai)
- Toshiyuki Nishida as Sashichi (Bakin)
- Yūko Tanaka as Ōei
- Kanako Higuchi as Ōnao / peasant girl
- Frankie Sakai as Nakajima Ise
- Nobuko Otowa as Ōyaku
- Yoichi Sase as Gosuke
- Taiji Tonoyama as the woodcarver
- Joe Shishido as Jippensha Ikku
- Kon Omura as Shikitei Sanba
- Kinya Aikawa as Utamaro
- Rokkō Toura as head clerk
- Hideo Kanze as Kanō Torukawa
- Kunio Otsuka as Tsutaya Jūzaburō

== Awards ==
- Blue Ribbon Award and Japan Academy Film Prize for Best Supporting Actress Yūko Tanaka
