= The Incident (1978 film) =

- Theatrical poster
- Directed by: Yoshitarō Nomura
- Written by: Kaneto Shindo
- Based on: Jiken by Shōhei Ōoka
- Starring: Keiko Matsuzaka; Toshiyuki Nagashima; Shinobu Otake; Tsunehiko Watase; Tetsurō Tamba; Shinsuke Ashida; Shin Saburi; Nobuko Otowa; Kō Nishimura; Hisaya Morishige
- Cinematography: Takashi Kawamata
- Music by: Yasushi Akutagawa
- Distributed by: Shochiku
- Release date: June 3, 1978 (Japan)
- Running time: 138 minutes
- Country: Japan
- Language: Japanese

The Incident (Japanese: 事件, Hepburn: Jiken) is a 1978 Japanese film directed by Yoshitarō Nomura. Among many awards, it was chosen as the Best Film at the Japan Academy Prize ceremony. The film is based on the novel by Shōhei Ōoka.

== Cast ==
- Keiko Matsuzaka: Hatsuko Sakai
- Shinobu Otake: Yoshiko Sakai
- Toshiyuki Nagashima: Hiroshi Ueda
- Tsunehiko Watase: Takeshi Hanai
- Tetsurō Tamba: Kikuchi
- Kei Yamamoto
- Junko Natsu
- Shinsuke Ashida: Okabe
- Shin Saburi
- Nobuko Otowa: Sumie Sakai
- Kō Nishimura
- Tanie Kitabayashi
- Tsutomu Isobe
- Takanobu Hozumi
- Asao Sano
- Hisaya Morishige

== Bibliography ==
- 事件 (in Japanese). Japanese Movie Database.
- "JIKEN". The Complete Index to World Film.
- 事件 (in Japanese). www.walkerplus.com.
