= Villain (2010 film) =

- Film poster
- Directed by: Sang-il Lee
- Screenplay by: Shûichi Yoshida; Sang-il Lee
- Based on: Akunin; 2007 novel by Shûichi Yoshida
- Produced by: Genki Kawamura; Yoshihiro Suzuki
- Starring: Satoshi Tsumabuki; Eri Fukatsu; Masaki Okada; Hikari Mitsushima; Kirin Kiki; Akira Emoto
- Cinematography: Norimichi Kasamatsu
- Edited by: Takeshi Imai
- Music by: Joe Hisaishi
- Production company: Toho
- Distributed by: Toho
- Release date: September 11, 2010 (Japan)
- Running time: 139 minutes
- Country: Japan
- Language: Japanese
- Box office: $22,383,806

Villain (Japanese: 悪人, Hepburn: Akunin) is a 2010 Japanese drama film directed by Sang-il Lee, based on Shuichi Yoshida's crime noir novel of the same name. It was nominated for numerous awards at the 2011 Japan Academy Prize, including Best Film and Best Director (which was director Lee's second nomination, after his 2006 win for Hula Girls), and won five, which included all four acting awards and for the score by Joe Hisaishi.

== Plot ==
Abandoned by his mother at an early age, Yuichi Shimizu is a young man who lives with and takes care of his grandparents in a decaying fishing village near Nagasaki. He works as a blue-collar day-labourer and leads a lonely life: his only real interest is his car.

Looking for companionship through online dating sites, Yuichi meets Yoshino Ishibashi, a young insurance saleswoman from Fukuoka. But it is clear that Yoshino has no respect for Yuichi. She looks down on him, and even demands money for their encounters, which—as she candidly tells her friends—are just about sex. It becomes apparent that Yoshino keenly feels her own lack of social status (as the daughter of a barber), and has her real sights set on a spoiled rich university student by the name of Keigo Masuo, whom she met in a bar and subsequently pesters with emails.

During a fateful evening when Yoshino has just met Yuichi for one of their regular trysts (and also to collect money from him), she by chance runs into Masuo, and unceremoniously dumps Yuichi (who has driven hours from Nagasaki to see her) with hardly a word spoken. But, in his turn, Masuo has no respect for Yoshino, whom he feels is beneath him. He agrees to take her for a drive (and presumably something more), but is increasingly disgusted by her, insults her, and ends up violently throwing her out of his car on an isolated mountain road, leaving her stranded in the middle of the night. The humiliated Yuichi, however, has secretly followed the couple in his own car, and attempts to come to the aid of the abandoned Yoshino. But—far from being grateful—Yoshino scorns and abuses Yuichi in much the same way that Masuo has just scorned and abused her. The abuse turns into ugly threats, a tussle ensues, and in a fit of rage Yuichi strangles Yoshino and then flees. Since Yoshino had openly bragged to her friends beforehand that she was to meet the rich playboy Masuo that evening (and not her shameful working-class sex partner Yuichi), Masuo becomes the prime suspect in the murder. In a state of silent anguish, Yuichi attempts to go on with his daily life.

The following day, however, Yuichi receives an email. The message is from Mitsuyo Magome, a woman from Saga. Yuichi and Mitsuyo had exchanged emails once before, after meeting through the same online dating site. Mitsuyo also lives a lonely and mundane life, working at a men's clothing store and living with her younger sister. Looking for companionship, Mitsuyo decided to re-contact Yuichi several months after their initial correspondence. Their first encounter is far from romantic—Yuichi is obviously troubled and only interested in sex. It seems unlikely they will meet again, but some days later he turns up at her place of work to apologise for his behaviour.

In this impossible and doomed situation, a passionate love springs up between Yuichi and Mitsuyo: they run off to a seaside resort town, where Yuichi confesses his crime to her. By this time, however, Masuo has been cleared of the murder, and evidence has surfaced of Yuichi's involvement—Yuichi is now the wanted criminal: his face appears on the news, and his family are hounded by the media.

Nevertheless, Mitsuyo persuades Yuichi to stay on the run with her and not turn himself in. This act places a heavy burden on their own families as well as the victim's family.

== Cast ==
- Yuichi Shimizu - Satoshi Tsumabuki
- Yoshino Ishibashi - Hikari Mitsushima
- Keigo Masuo - Masaki Okada
- Mitsuyo Magome - Eri Fukatsu

== Awards ==
- 34th Japan Academy Prize
  - Won:
    - Best Actor - Satoshi Tsumabuki
    - Best Actress - Eri Fukatsu
    - Best Supporting Actor - Akira Emoto
    - Best Supporting Actress - Kirin Kiki
    - Best Music - Joe Hisaishi
  - Nominations:
  - Best Film
  - Best Director - Sang-il Lee
  - Best Supporting Actor - Masaki Okada
  - Best Supporting Actress - Hikari Mitsushima
- 2010 Kinema Junpo Awards
  - Won: Best Film
  - Won: Best Director - Sang-il Lee
  - Won: Best Supporting Actor - Akira Emoto
- 65th Mainichi Film Awards
  - Won: Best Film
