= The Yellow Handkerchief (1977 film) =

1977 Japanese drama by Yoji Yamada

- Theatrical poster to The Yellow Handkerchief (1977)
- Directed by: Yoji Yamada
- Written by: Yoshitaka Asama & Yoji Yamada
- Starring: Ken Takakura
- Cinematography: Tetsuo Takaha
- Edited by: Iwao Ishii
- Music by: Masaru Sato
- Distributed by: Shochiku
- Release date: October 1, 1977 (Japan)
- Running time: 108 minutes
- Country: Japan
- Language: Japanese

The Yellow Handkerchief (Japanese: 幸福の黄色いハンカチ, Hepburn: Shiawase no kiiroi hankachi; lit. "The Yellow Handkerchief of Happiness") is a 1977 Japanese drama film directed by Yoji Yamada. It was the winner of the first Best Picture award at the Japan Academy Prize. The film was inspired by the American song "Tie a Yellow Ribbon Round the Ole Oak Tree," itself based on a column series written by journalist Pete Hamill for the New York Post in 1971.

== Plot ==
Kinya Hanada, who has fallen out of love with Nobuko, has retired and bought a Mazda Familia. He takes a ferry alone to Hokkaido. Arriving in Abashiri he starts talking to a woman in front of the station.

Meanwhile, Yusaku Shima, a former coal miner who has finished his sentence, is released from Abashiri prison. He stops by the cafeteria and orders beer with soy sauce ramen and katsudon. Kinya, who was just in Abashiri, also picks up a woman, Akemi (played by Kaori Momoi), who came to Tokyo after a difficult time with her colleagues at work, and had a meal with her. Yusaku, who finished his meal and stopped at the post office, wrote out a postcard and mailed it.

Kinya starts driving with Akemi. They came to the beach, and had Yusaku, who was also there, take a picture. The two will ride with him and start the trip.

That night, Kinya, sharing a room with Akemi at the Akanko Onsen inn, started arguing with Akemi and leaned on Akemi, saying "only a kiss." Akemi, who was resisting, suddenly stopped moving and began to cry. Yusaku, staying in the next room, hears the turmoil and gives a shout to Kinya.

The three people continue to travel even though they are very tired. The next day, near Rikubetsu Station Yusaku was not chatty while eating crab in a small dining room near where Kinya was born. After that, instead of Kinya, who ran into the toilet with a car on the street while feeling abdominal pain while driving, Akumi said, "I went to provisional exemption" to pass the tractor of the oncoming car, but the car swerved. In the chaos he dashed out of the car through the farmland and forced a car into a bales of hay, causing Kinya and Akemi to argue, and Akemi began to cry. Negotiating with Yusaku, he will stay at the farmhouse. Then Yusaku discussed with Kinya with respect to non-principled attitude against Akemi of Kinya. From the conversation in the car, it becomes clear that Yusaku is heading to Yubari, where he once lived.

At the parking lot in Obihiro, Kinya kicks a Lincoln Continental thinking it is unattended. As a result, he is struck by a yakuza-style man who was riding but escaped from difficulties after Yusaku's counterattack. However, as Yusaku drove the car as it was, the story unfolded. Their car was caught in a simultaneous inspection of a robbery, and it turned out that Yusaku was unlicensed. When asked why he was unlicensed, he said he had been in prison for murder for the past six years until the day before yesterday. He will be taken to the nearest Shintoku police station, where the chief who presided over Yusaku's case, Watanabe Kiyoshi, is on duty by chance, and his warm feelings make him happy. Yusaku, back from the police station, says he will continue traveling via train, but in the end, the three-person journey continues.

Yusaku gradually talks about his past in the car and in the room of the inn. He mentions meeting his wife, Mitsue, who was a cashier at the supermarket, their wedding, and their happy honeymoon. After that, Yusaku was pleased that Mitsue seems to have become pregnant. He grew up without knowing his parents because his father died in the war. He said he wanted to tell Mitsue that she would go to the doctor soon, and bravely went to work when Mitsue said, "If you are pregnant, fly the yellow handkerchief on a stick." Yusaku, who found one yellow handkerchief fluttering on the way home from work, felt as if he was rising to heaven. However, a few days later, even though he said, "Do not overdo it," Mitsue, who worked hard, miscarried. Yusaku learns about Mitsue's past at the hospital. It was a miscarriage five years before. "I hate the woman who hides secretly," he said, because he was angry and was sick of the sake. Even though Mitsue said she did not know about the previous miscarriage, the desperate Yusaku became disillusioned, went out to the downtown at night, and started a quarrel with Chimpira. In the fight, a man is killed.

Yusaku, arrested and in prison, decides to divorce. Yusaku instructed Mitsue who visited us, saying, "Now you are still young, and if you feel like that, you may be a good man, be happy." "You were a selfish person, even when I met you," Mitsue cried, but this was a love expression for a man of his style, who could only live a clumsy way of life." After a while, a divorce notice was sent to prison. I blame him, "I wonder what I can do at that time." "Why did you become a yakuza like this?" "I will say goodbye to Sapporo tomorrow." "If I didn't work, I might go to Tokyo." Kinya weeps.

A wandering theater troup (Unified Theater) is singing "Ginza Kankan Musume" in the small square, but Yusaku is deeply moved by watching the carp streamer fluttering in the sky. Yusaku is said to head to Yubari alone. When asked why he confessed that he had posted a postcard to Mitsue in Abashiri just after his release. The postcard said, "If you're still alone and waiting for me... hang a yellow handkerchief on the streamer of the carp. That's a sign. If it's not down, I just turn back. I will never appear again in Yubari." Upon hearing that, Kinya and Akemi decide to go to Yubari together without hesitation.

"I'll turn back," "I can't think he's alone," "I'm with someone," and the feelings of a shaking man and the two people encourage it. Yusaku, who is timid, "he shouldn't be waiting for me," asks him to turn back and does so once. In response to the persuasion, he went back to Yubari again. The car enters the town of Yubari. Akemi explains the scenery one by one to Yusaku, who can no longer look outside, and Yusaku answers. Yusaku explains the way to the voice of "I crossed the railroad crossing". You can hear the children's songs about "backspin." Kinya considers the unlikely event that he may have moved. Eventually, the car stopped and Kinya and Akemi went out and looked around.

Without finding it, Kinya said, "I'm in front of the bathhouse right now," but there was something in his line of sight. When Akemi calls Kinya, he shouts, "Huh, that!" Dozens of yellow handkerchiefs fluttered in the wind in front of the line of sight. Yusaku is shoved in the crowd. No words were needed for the reunion of the two. They stare at each other and disappear into the house in a friendly way.

Kinya and Akemi who saw the event naturally hold hands in the car, hug each other strongly, and kiss. A yellow handkerchief of happiness hangs on a koinobori pole against the backdrop of the city of Yubari.

== Cast ==
- Ken Takakura: Yusaku Shima
- Chieko Baisho: Mitsue Shima
- Tetsuya Takeda: Kinya Hanada
- Kaori Momoi: Akemi Ogawa
- Hachirō Tako
- Hisao Dazai: Ryokan Manager
- Mari Okamoto: Ramen Shop Girl
- Kiyoshi Atsumi: Watanabe Kachō

== Adaptations ==
- Yathra (1985)
- The Yellow Handkerchief (2008)

== Bibliography ==
- Shiawase no kiiroi hankachi (1977) at IMDb
- 幸福の黄色いハンカチ (in Japanese). Japanese Movie Database.
- "KOFUKU NO KIROI HANKACHI". [The Complete Index to World Film].
- 幸福の黄色いハンカチ (in Japanese). [www.walkerplus.com].
- "Variety Japan" 幸福の黄色いハンカチ (in Japanese). Variety Japan.
