= Anata e =

- Poster
- Directed by: Yasuo Furuhata
- Written by: Takeshi Aoshima
- Produced by: Yoshihiro Sato; Jun'ichi Shindō; Mitsuharu Maeda; Toshiki Kokubo
- Starring: Ken Takakura; Yūko Tanaka; Takeshi Kitano; Tadanobu Asano; Tsuyoshi Kusanagi
- Cinematography: Junichiro Hayashi
- Edited by: Hani Mituhashi
- Music by: Yusuke Hayashi
- Distributed by: Toho
- Release date: August 25, 2012 (Japan)
- Running time: 111 minutes
- Country: Japan
- Language: Japanese

Anata e (Japanese: あなたへ; lit. To You), also known as Dearest, is a 2012 Japanese drama film directed by Yasuo Furuhata.

== Plot ==
The story follows the journey of a man traveling some 1000 kilometers from Toyama City, Japan to his wife's hometown in Nagasaki Prefecture, in order to scatter her ashes into the sea. Along the way, he travels through several locations, including the ruins of Takeda Castle, Shimonoseki City, the Kanmon Bridge, Moji-ku, Kitakyūshū, and Sasebo, Nagasaki, recalling experiences with his wife along the way. He also befriends and is assisted by numerous strangers.

Eiji Kurashima, a correctional officer at a prison in Toyama, receives a picture postcard from his late wife, Yoko. The letter reveals her final wish—to have her ashes scattered in her hometown sea, a wish he never knew about before. Her will had been held at the Hirado post office for seven days before reaching him. Seeking to understand his late wife's true feelings, Eiji embarks on a solo journey in a modified van he built himself, traveling from Toyama through Hida-Takayama, Kyoto, Osaka, Takeda Castle, the Seto Inland Sea, Shimonoseki, and Kitakyushu, eventually reaching his wife’s hometown in Hirado, Nagasaki. Along the way, he encounters various people and experiences their lives, leading him to rediscover the depth of his wife's love.

== Cast ==
- Ken Takakura as Eiji Kurashima
- Yūko Tanaka as Yoko, his wife
- Takeshi Kitano as Sugino Teruo, Japanese literature teacher
- Tadanobu Asano as Cop
- Tsuyoshi Kusanagi as Tamiya Yuji, food-stall cook
- Kōichi Satō as "Nambara", food-stall cook and former fisherman
- Haruka Ayase as Naoko Hamazaki, young waitress and Nambara's daughter
- Kimiko Yo as Tamiko Hamazaki, her mother, eatery owner, and Nambara's widow/wife
- Hideji Ōtaki as Ohura Goro, elderly boat owner, and estranged father of Nambara
- Takahiro Miura
- Kyōzō Nagatsuka
- Mieko Harada

== Production ==
Around the time of filming, Takakura was 80 years of age. His role as Kurashima was his last before his death in 2014. Hideji Ōtaki, who played Nambara's estranged father, died a few months after the film's release.
