= Dr. Akagi =

- Film poster
- Directed by: Shohei Imamura
- Written by: Ango Sakaguchi (novel Doctor Liver); Shohei Imamura; Daisuke Tengan
- Produced by: Hiso Ino; Koji Matsuda
- Starring: Akira Emoto; Kumiko Asō
- Cinematography: Shigeru Komatsubara
- Edited by: Hajime Okayasu
- Music by: Yosuke Yamashita
- Distributed by: Imamura Productions, Kadokawa Shoten Publishing Co. Ltd., Toei Co. Ltd., Tohokashinsha Film Company Ltd., Kino International (USA)
- Release dates: 17 October 1998 (Japan); 15 January 1999 (U.S.)
- Running time: 129 min. (Japan)
- Country: Japan
- Language: Japanese

Dr. Akagi, known in Japan as Kanzō-sensei (カンゾー先生; literally "Dr. Liver"), is a 1998 Japanese comedy-drama film by director Shohei Imamura. For his work on the film, Yosuke Yamashita was awarded Best Film Score at the 1999 Mainichi Film Concours.

== Plot ==
The film concerns Dr. Akagi, a doctor on an island in the Seto Inland Sea area during World War II. He runs into conflict with the military while trying to combat a hepatitis epidemic. Akagi earns the nickname "Dr. Liver" (カンゾー先生 Kanzō-sensei) because of his work, though the townsfolk use it as a humorous dig at his persistent diagnosis. Though the broad circumstance of Japan slowly losing the war is the setting, many of the interactions and situations tilt into humor; for instance, the very music used for the doctor running from patient to patient has an upbeat and light-hearted tone.

== Cast ==
- Akira Emoto : Dr. Fûu Akagi
- Kumiko Asō : Sonoko Mannami
- Jacques Gamblin : Pete
- Tomorowo Taguchi : Nosaka
- Yukiya Kitamura : Sankichi
- Misa Shimizu : Gin
- Masatō Ibu : Ikeda
- Masanori Sera
- Ben Hiura
- Kaoru Mizuki
- Sanshō Shinsui
- Eri Watanabe
- Ayumi Ito

Dutch, British soldiers- US Marines from MCAS Iwakuni MALS-12, Japanese Rugby Team, and representatives of Teachers of English language in Japan.
