= Mitsuko Baisho =

Japanese actress

- 倍賞 美津子
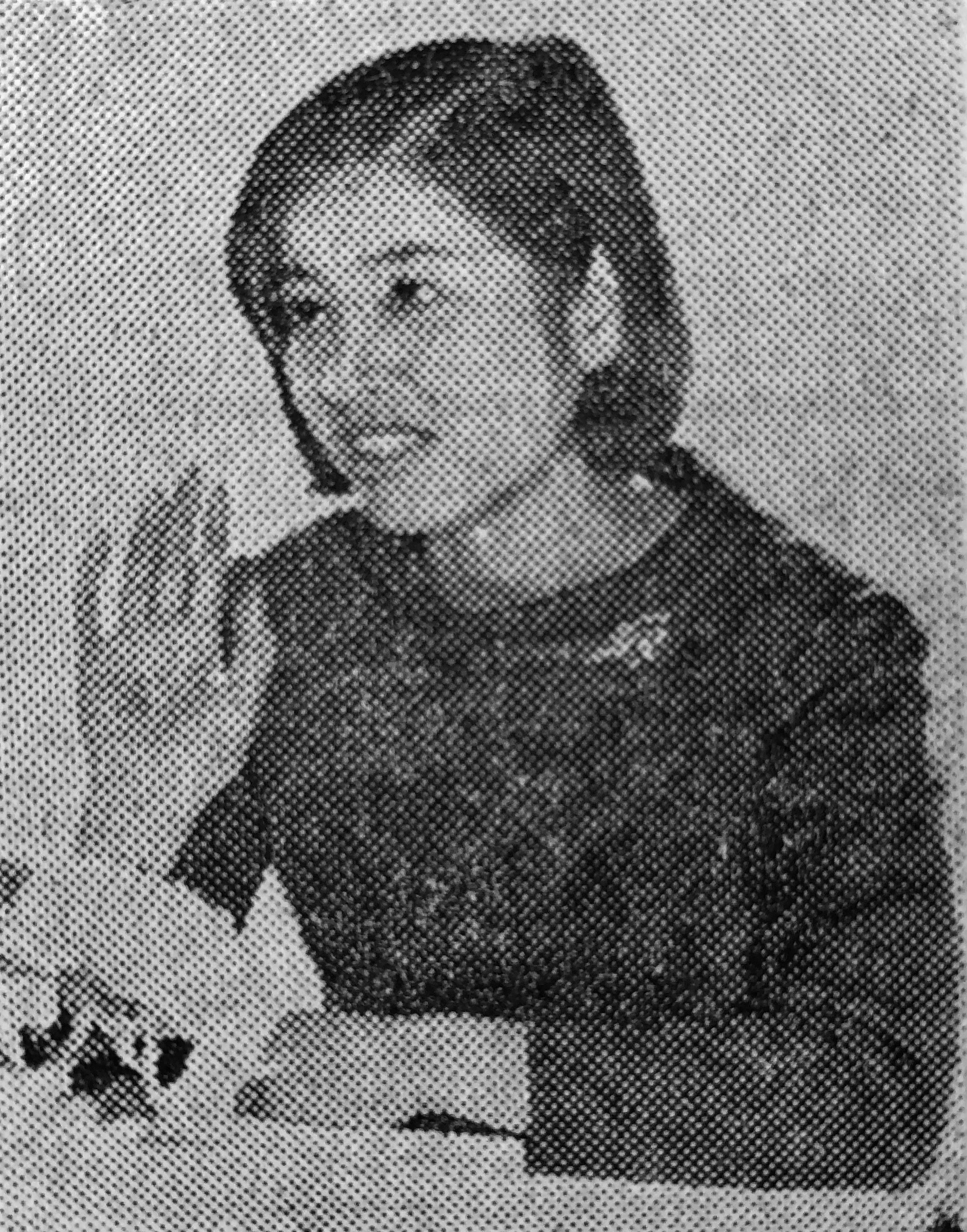
- Born: November 22, 1946 (age 80); Ibaraki Prefecture, Japan
- Occupation: Actress
- Years active: 1967–present
- Spouse: Antonio Inoki (m. 1971; div. 1987)
- Children: Hiroko Inoki
- Relatives: Naoto Inoki (grandson)
- Website: lotus-roots.co.jp/baisho/en/

Mitsuko Baisho (倍賞 美津子, Baishō Mitsuko; born November 22, 1946 in Ibaraki Prefecture) is a Japanese actress whose most internationally known work has been for director Shohei Imamura, from 1979 up to the director's final film in 2001.

== Career ==
Baisho has also appeared in films directed by Akira Kurosawa. She won awards for best actress at the 10th Hochi Film Award for Love Letter by Tatsumi Kumashiro and Ikiteru Uchi ga Hana nano yo Shindara Sore made yo to Sengen. She also won the award for best supporting actress at the 8th Hochi Film Award for The Geisha and at the 22nd Hochi Film Award for Tokyo Lullaby.

== Private life ==
Her sister is actress-singer Chieko Baisho.

She was married to professional wrestler Antonio Inoki from 1971 to 1987, and together they had a daughter, Hiroko.

== Partial filmography ==
=== Films ===
- Hitokiri (1969)
- Duel at Fort Ezo (1970)
- Sword of Fury (1973)
- Manhunt (1976)
- The Life of Chikuzan (1977)
- Bandits vs. Samurai Squadron (1978)
- Vengeance Is Mine (1979)
- Kagemusha (1980)
- Eijanaika (1981)
- Flames of Blood (1981)
- P.P. Rider (1983)
- The Ballad of Narayama (1983)
- The Geisha (1983)
- Okinawan Boys (1983)
- The Crazy Family (1984)
- Love Letter (1985)
- Cabaret (1986)
- Women Who Do Not Divorce (1986)
- Aitsu ni Koishite (1987)
- Sure-Fire Death 4: We Will Avenge You (1987)
- Zegen (1987)
- My Phoenix (1989)
- Dreams (1990)
- Last Song (1994)
- A Last Note (1995)
- The Eel (1997)
- Tokyo Lullaby (1997)
- Toki o Kakeru Shōjo (1997)
- Solitude Point, aka Yukie (1997)
- Love Letter (1998)
- Second Chance (episode 3) (1999)
- By Player (2000)
- Turn (2001)
- Warm Water Under a Red Bridge (2001)
- 11'09"01 September 11 (2002)
- Out (2002)
- Der grosse Sommer (2016)
- Sing My Life (2016)
- Threads: Our Tapestry of Love (2020), Setsuko Murata
- In the Wake (2021)
- Offbeat Cops (2022)
- 52-Hertz Whales (2024), Sachie Muranaka
- Undergirl (2026)

=== Television ===
- Zatoichi: The Blind Swordsman, Season 4, Episode 6 (1979), Oyone
- Tantei Monogatari (1979-1980), lawyer Masako Aiki
- Ryōmaden (2010), Iwasaki Miwa
- Anone (2018), Masako Tamegai
- Black Pean (2018), Harue Tokai
- Gannibal (2022–25), Gin Gotō
