= A Chaos of Flowers =

1988 film by Kinji Fukasaku

- Theatrical release poster
- Directed by: Kinji Fukasaku
- Screenplay by: Kinji Fukasaku; Fumio Konami; Tomomi Tsutsui
- Based on: Hana no ran by Michiko Nagahata
- Starring: Sayuri Yoshinaga; Yūsaku Matsuda; Kimiko Ikegami; Keiko Matsuzaka; Morio Kazama; Ken Ogata
- Cinematography: Daisaku Kimura
- Edited by: Isamu Ichida
- Music by: Takayuki Inoue
- Distributed by: Toei Company
- Release date: October 1, 1988 (Japan)
- Running time: 139 minutes
- Country: Japan
- Language: Japanese

A Chaos of Flowers (Japanese: 華の乱, Hepburn: Hana no ran), also known as The Rage of Love, is a 1988 Japanese film directed by Kinji Fukasaku. The film portrays the movements of society and art in the Taishō period from the viewpoint of Akiko Yosano.

== Plot ==
One month after falling in love with the writer Hiroshi Yosano, Akiko leaves her parents to move to Tokyo to be with him. After they marry, Akiko faces gossip that she drove Hiroshi's wife away. Upset at her poetry, some Japanese citizens consider Akiko a traitor and set fire to her house. Hiroshi Yosano grows poor attempting to continue circulation of the magazine Bright Star.

After attending the opera, Akiko is knocked over by a motorcycle driven by the author Takeo Arishima. He sends her a Western outfit as an apology gift but she brings it back to his home to return it to him. The editor Akiko Hatano pressures Arishima to provide an essay about suicide for her publication but he is reluctant to do so.

Hiroshi runs for election to the House of Representatives, funded by the uncle of Tomiko Yamakawa, Akiko's former romantic rival. Akiko makes negative statements about the campaign and Hiroshi eventually loses, but chooses to stay with Tomiko while she recovers from tuberculosis.

The actress Sumiko hangs herself after her lover Hogetsu commits suicide. At the memorial service, Arishima asks Akiko to come with him to his father's farm at the foot of Mount Yōtei in Hokkaido. Akiko tells her children that she will return by Sunday. In Hokkaido, Arishima is briefly arrested for holding a socialist meeting with the farmers. Tomiko dies and Hiroshi returns home. Akiko returns home from Hokkaido days later than expected and her children have grown to hate her for her selfish actions.

Arishima and the editor Akiko Hatano decide to commit suicide together. They stop themselves at the last moment several times until they are caught in an embrace by her husband, who threatens to sue for adultery. They then hang themselves together at Arishima's home.

After the 1923 Great Kantō earthquake destroys the Yasano home, Akiko reads that her friends the anarchist Sakae Osugi and Noe Itou have been executed by the police. When she sees two of their anarchist friends being dragged by chains behind mounted police, she rushes to give them some rice balls and encourages them to live on. Akiko and Hiroshi commit themselves to living on and rebuilding their home.

== Cast ==
- Sayuri Yoshinaga as Akiko Yosano
- Keiko Matsuzaka as Sumako Matsui
- Ken Ogata as Hiroshi Yosano
- Kimiko Ikegami as Akiko Hatano
- Morio Kazama as Sakae Osugi
- Eri Ishida as Noe Itō
- Yūsaku Matsuda as Takeo Arishima
- Yoshiko Nakada as Tomiko Yamakawa
- Mineko Nishikawa as Takino Hayashi
- Mikio Narita as Harufusa Hatano
- Keizo Kanie as Hogetsu Shimamura
- Renji Ishibashi as Shojiro Sawada
- Takashi Naitō as Kyutaro Wada
- Eri Saito as Natsuko Fukao
- Jack Atkinson as Fahv
- Miki Sanjo as Arishima's mother
