= Hope and Pain =

- DVD cover

Japanese name
- Kana: ダウンタウン・ヒーローズ
- Directed by: Yoji Yamada
- Screenplay by: Yoji Yamada; Yoshitaka Asama
- Based on: Downtown Heroes by Akira Hayasaka
- Produced by: Kogi Tanaka; Shigehiro Nakagawa
- Starring: Hiroko Yakushimaru; Hashinosuke Nakamura III; Toshirō Yanagiba; Toshinori Omi; Tetta Sugimoto
- Cinematography: Tetsuo Takaha
- Edited by: Iwao Ishii
- Music by: Teizo Matsumura
- Production company: Shochiku
- Distributed by: Shochiku
- Release date: August 6, 1988 (Japan)
- Running time: 120 minutes
- Country: Japan
- Language: Japanese
- Box office: ¥810 million

Hope and Pain (Japanese: 希望と痛み, Hepburn: Kibō to Itami), also known as Downtown Heroes (Japanese: ダウンタウン・ヒーローズ, Hepburn: Dauntaun Hiirōzu), is a 1988 Japanese drama film directed by Yoji Yamada. It was Japan's submission to the 61st Academy Awards for the Academy Award for Best Foreign Language Film, but was not accepted as a nominee. It was also entered into the 39th Berlin International Film Festival.

== Cast ==
- Hiroko Yakushimaru as Fusako Nakahara
- Hashinosuke Nakamura III as Kosuke Shima
- Toshirō Yanagiba as Onkel, Keigo Hinoki
- Toshinori Omi as Arles, Sadaichi Takai
- Tetta Sugimoto as Gan, Iwao Ishido
- Shinobu Sakagami as Chopinski, Choichiro Saeki
- Eri Ishida as Sakiko Taniguchi, Prostitute
- Keiko Awaji as Coffee Shop's Madame
- Nakamura Shikan VII as Kosuke today (special appearance)
- Chieko Baisho as Kosuke's Mother, Tamiko Shima
- Kiyoshi Atsumi as Havaosuke the Dormitory Cook

== See also ==
- Cinema of Japan
- List of submissions to the 61st Academy Awards for Best Foreign Language Film
- List of Japanese submissions for the Academy Award for Best Foreign Language Film
