= A Terminal Trust =

- Poster
- Directed by: Masayuki Suo
- Written by: Masayuki Suo
- Based on: Tsui no Shintaku by Tatsuki Saku
- Produced by: Chihiro Kameyama
- Starring: Tamiyo Kusakari; Kōji Yakusho; Tadanobu Asano; Takao Osawa
- Cinematography: Rokuro Terada
- Edited by: Junichi Kikuchi
- Music by: Yoshikazu Suo
- Production company: Altamira Pictures
- Release dates: September 3, 2012 (Montreal World Film Festival); October 27, 2012 (Japan)
- Running time: 144 minutes
- Country: Japan
- Language: Japanese

A Terminal Trust (Japanese: 終の信託, Hepburn: Tsui no Shintaku) is a 2012 Japanese drama film directed by Masayuki Suo and starring Tamiyo Kusakari, Kōji Yakusho, Tadanobu Asano and Takao Osawa. It is Suo's first fiction film since I Just Didn't Do It (2007).

== Cast ==
- Tamiyo Kusakari as Ayano Orii
- Kōji Yakusho as Shinzo Egi
- Tadanobu Asano as Takai
- Takao Osawa as Tsukahara
- Yoshihiko Hosoda

== Release ==
The film premiered at the Montreal World Film Festival in September 2012 and screened in the Special Screening section at the 25th Tokyo International Film Festival in October 2012.

== Reception ==
Mark Schilling of The Japan Times said, "Expect something thoughtful, informed — and utterly unlike the usual sob-fest Japanese medical melodrama." James Hadfield of Time Out said, "Trust director Masayuki Suo to reunite the stars of his most popular film for a cheery romantic drama about assisted dying. Shall We Dance? leads Tamiyo Kusakari and Kōji Yakusho play a doctor and her terminally ill patient, with a support cast including Tadanobu Asano and Takao Osawa." Hugo Ozman of Twitch Film described the film as "a thought-provoking film that will please viewers who like serious dramas" and "a beautiful film with deep meanings and some of the best performances in a Japanese film this year." However, John Defore of The Hollywood Reporter said, "It's understandable Suo would want to give so much screen time to the highly sympathetic Yakusho, but doing so doesn't serve the dramatic structure of a film that might've been much more provocative than it is."
