= Tamiyo =

Tamiyo may refer to:

- Tamiyo Kusakari (born 1965), a Japanese actress and former ballet dancer.
- Tamiyo Taga, a leader of Bharatiya Janata Party, India

== See also ==
- 民代 (disambiguation)
