= Abnormal Family: Older Brother's Bride =

1984 film by Masayuki Suo

- DVD cover
- Directed by: Masayuki Suo
- Screenplay by: Masayuki Suo
- Produced by: Keiko Satō; Itsumichi Isomura
- Starring: Kaoru Kaze; Miki Yamaji; Usagi Asō; Ren Osugi; Kei Shutō
- Cinematography: Yuichi Nagata
- Edited by: Junichi Kikuchi
- Music by: Yoshikazu Suo
- Production company: Kokuei
- Distributed by: Shintōhō Eiga
- Release date: June 5, 1984 (Japan)
- Running time: 62 minutes
- Country: Japan
- Language: English

Abnormal Family: Older Brother's Bride (Japanese: 変態家族兄貴の嫁さん, Hepburn: Hentai kazoku: Aniki no yomesan), also known as Spring Bride, Daughter-in-Law, or My Brother's Wife, is a 1984 Japanese pink film written and directed by Masayuki Suo and released by Shintōhō Eiga.

== Synopsis ==
Complications are brought to a middle-class family when older brother Kōichi brings home his new sexually voracious bride Yuriko. Younger brother Kazuo looks to the new arrival as a source of sexual release while sister Akiko surreptitiously works in a soapland and Father lusts after a bar proprietess.

== Cast ==
- Kaoru Kaze (風かおる) as Yuriko Mamiya
- Miki Yamaji (山地美貴) as Akiko Mamiya
- Usagi Asō (麻生うさぎ) as the Bar Madam
- Ren Osugi as Shukichi Mamiya (the Father)
- Kei Shutō (首藤啓) as Kazuo Mamiya
- Shirō Shimomoto as Kōichi Mamiya

== Background ==
Although he had written screenplays for other pink films and was an assistant director (and a bit player) in Kiyoshi Kurosawa's Kandagawa Pervert Wars, this film marks the directorial debut of Masayuki Suo who would later achieve international fame for his film Shall We Dance? Abnormal Family: Older Brother's Bride has been discussed by movie critics as an homage to or parody of the family dramas of early Japanese director Yasujirō Ozu. Jasper Sharp says it wittily puts together the plots of a number of Ozu's best known works within the framework of a pink film. Suo also uses the trademark camera angles, visual effects and stylized movements from Ozu's films in contrast with the sexual antics of this genre.

== Release ==
The film was released theatrically in Japan on June 5, 1984.

== Home media ==
It was published as a DVD in Japan on June 28, 2002 by Uplink (アップリンク). It had earlier (May 2000) been released in Video CD format with Chinese and English subtitles by Asia Video Publishing Company.
