= Lady Maiko =

- Poster
- 舞妓はレディ
- Directed by: Masayuki Suo
- Written by: Masayuki Suo
- Starring: Mone Kamishiraishi; Hiroki Hasegawa; Sumiko Fuji
- Cinematography: Rokuro Terada
- Edited by: Junichi Kikuchi
- Music by: Yoshikazu Suo
- Production company: Altamira Pictures
- Distributed by: Toho
- Release dates: June 16, 2014 (SIFF); September 13, 2014 (Japan)
- Running time: 134 minutes
- Country: Japan
- Language: Japanese

Lady Maiko (Japanese: 舞妓はレディ, Hepburn: Maiko wa Lady) is a 2014 Japanese musical comedy film written and directed by Masayuki Suo, starring Mone Kamishiraishi, Hiroki Hasegawa, and Sumiko Fuji. It screened in competition at the 2014 Shanghai International Film Festival on June 16, 2014. It was released in Japan on September 13, 2014.

== Cast ==
- Mone Kamishiraishi as Haruko Saigo
- Hiroki Hasegawa as Noritsugu Kyono
- Sumiko Fuji as Chiharu Kojima
- Tomoko Tabata as Momoharu
- Tamiyo Kusakari as Satoharu
- Eri Watanabe as Mameharu
- Naoto Takenaka as Tomio Aoki
- Masahiro Takashima as Yoshio Takai
- Gaku Hamada as Shuhei Nishino
- Ittoku Kishibe as Orikichi Kitano
- Fumiyo Kohinata as Kanpachiro Ichikawa
- Satoshi Tsumabuki as Yuichiro Akagi
- Jurina Matsui as Fukuna
- Tomu Muto as Fukuha

== Reception ==
Elizabeth Kerr of The Hollywood Reporter commented that "[Masayuki Suo] brings the same light, optimistic touch to bear as he did with his best known films, Sumo Do, Sumo Don't and Shall We Dance?, which similarly revolved around gently non-conformist characters doing (and enjoying) what they shouldn’t in rigid Japan."

Derek Elley of Film Business Asia wrote: "With no romance between pupil and master, the film lacks a strong emotional arc to involve an audience; in its place is just Haruko's own story of wanting to become a geisha, and here Kamishiraishi's performance as the underdog who eventually triumphs manages to carry the day." Mark Shilling of The Japan Times gave the film 3 and a half stars out of 5, saying, "Kamishiraishi, the 16-year-old newcomer who beat out 800 other aspirants for the lead role, is a diminutive vocal dynamo and a good fit as the country-girl heroine, right down to her native Kagoshima dialect."

Kwenton Bellette of Twitch Film felt that "[the] beautiful tourist-baiting scenes of Kyoto and the geisha district are brought to vivid life thanks to the detail-laden environment and costume design although the film contains itself to one tea-house through the majority of its length." Maggie Lee of Variety wrote: "Craft contributions are aces, the richly costumed and decorated production presenting Kyoto's landscaped gardens, seasonal scenery and architecture to most pleasing effect."

It debuted at number 5 at the Japanese box office on its opening weekend, earning $1 million from 91,800 admissions.

== Awards ==
- 69th Mainichi Film Award for Best Music (Yoshikazu Suo)
- 38th Japan Academy Prize for Best Music (Yoshikazu Suo)
