= Jurina Matsui =

Japanese entertainer (born 1997)

- 松井 珠理奈
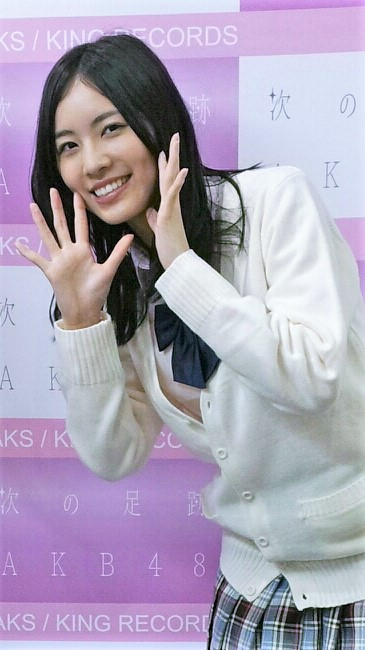
- Matsui at the Tsugi no Ashiato Theater ver. Handshake and Photo Event May 3, 2014
- Born: March 8, 1997 (age 29); Kasugai, Aichi, Japan
- Other name: Jyurina Matsui
- Occupations: TV personality; singer; actress
- Years active: 2008–present
- Height: 163 cm (5 ft 4 in)
- Spouse: Tatsunori Tsujimoto (m. 2026)
- Musical career
- Genre: J-pop
- Instrument: Vocals
- Years active: 2008–2021
- Label: Showroom Records
- Formerly of: SKE48; AKB48
- Website: jurinamatsui.com

YouTube information
- Channel: Jurina HOUSE
- Years active: 2020–present
- Genre: Vlog
- Subscribers: 22.3 thousand
- Views: 972 thousand
- Last updated: September 4, 2024

Signature
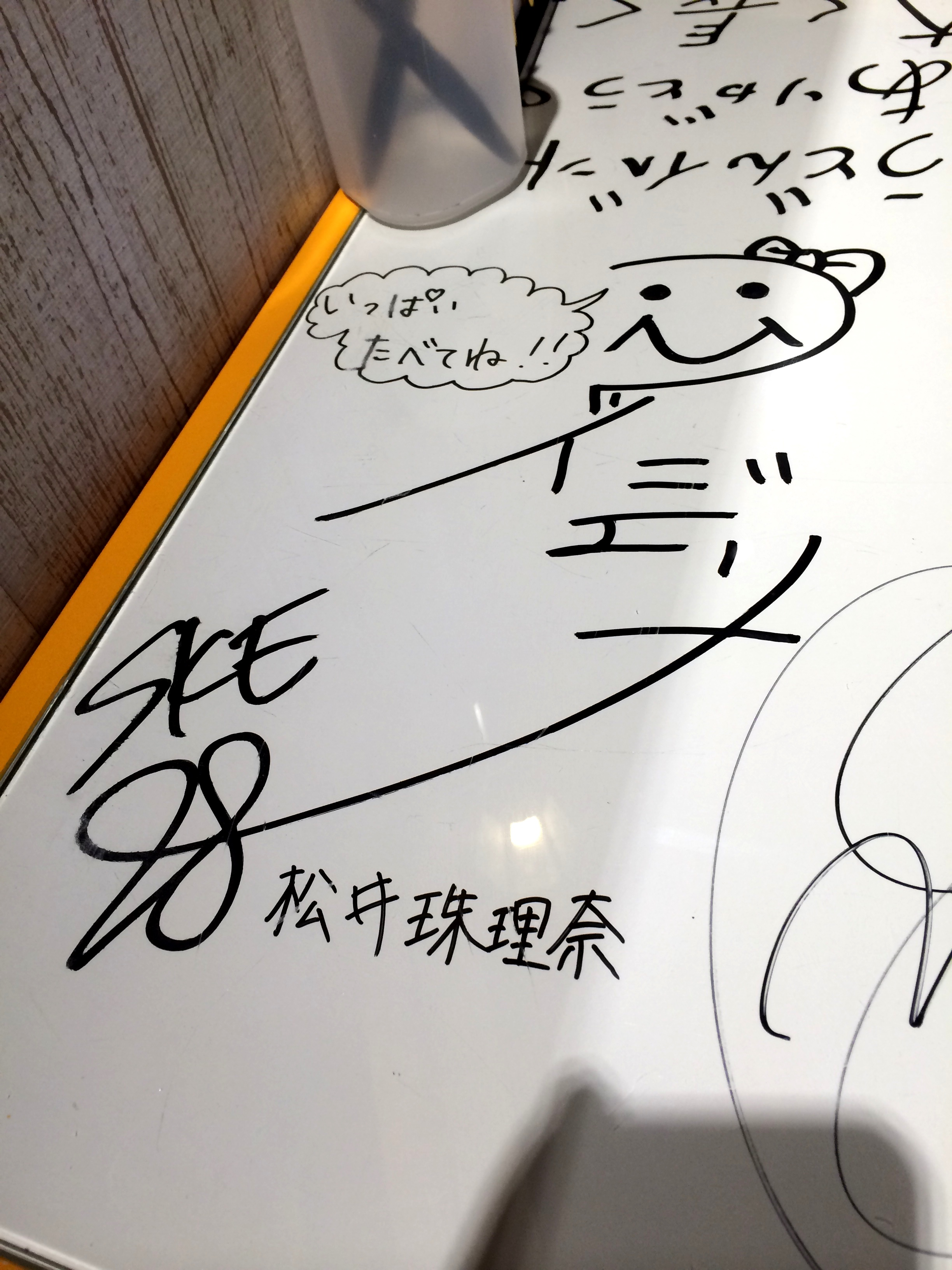

Jurina Matsui (松井 珠理奈, Matsui Jurina; born March 8, 1997) is a Japanese TV personality, singer, actress, and YouTuber. She is a former member of Japanese idol girl group SKE48 and former concurrent member of AKB48 (in 2012–2015). She is recognized as SKE48's absolute "ace", having placed in the top 10 in many of AKB48's annual general elections and winning the 2018 election.

Matsui debuted with SKE48 in 2008 and was soon appointed as the center position for AKB48's single "Ōgoe Diamond", making her the first sister group member to participate and serve as the choreography center in the group's main single lineup. Matsui graduated from SKE48 in 2021 with her last single "Koiochi Flag".

As a solo artist, Matsui has starred in many supporting roles and had her first leading role in horror TV drama Death Cash (2016). She released her self-written first solo album Privacy on October 5, 2019. After her graduation, Matsui is active as a TV personality and occasionally involves in sports events, especially pro-wrestling.

== Early life ==
Jurina Matsui was born on March 8, 1997, in Kasugai, Aichi Prefecture as the only child to Yumiko Matsui, a cosmetologist. Her parents were separated due to her father's gambling addiction. Matsui was interested in singing since nursery school, then came to like dancing when she started to attend hip-hop dance school around the third grade of primary school. Thinking singing and dancing are what idols do, Matsui started aiming to become an idol.

== Music career ==
=== 2008–2012: Debut with "Ōgoe Diamond" and SKE48 ===
In 2008, Matsui auditioned for SKE48 and made her debut performance on October 5 at SKE48 Theater in Sakae, Nagoya. Three months later, at the age of 11, Matsui was chosen as the choreography center and the cover girl for AKB48's single "Ōgoe Diamond". It was the first time an AKB48 single would feature a member of a sister group.

In 2009, Matsui was chosen again as one of the centers for AKB48's 11th major single "10nen Sakura" with Atsuko Maeda. Since then Matsui continued to participate in the main lineup of AKB48's singles until 2018, except singles which lineup was decided by the rock-paper-scissor tournaments. In August, Matsui served as the choreography center for SKE48's debut single "Tsuyoki Mono yo" then continued to hold that position until "Mae Nomeri" in 2015.

In 2011, Matsui starred as one of the leading roles in the music video for AKB48's 20th single "Sakura no Ki ni Narō".

=== 2012–2017: Concurrent position in AKB48 ===
In early 2012, following scandals in which members Natsumi Hirajima and Rumi Yonezawa resigned from AKB48, Matsui was added to AKB48 as a temporary concurrent member to fill in one of the vacant positions. She later made her debut performance at AKB48 Theater on June 1. On September 18, Matsui was announced to be one of the center performers for AKB48's 28th single "Uza" with Yuko Oshima, and performed the song for the first time at the group's rock-paper-scissors tournament.

At the next rock-paper-scissors tournament in 2013, Matsui came out as the winner after beating a total of 83 members which earned her the center position for the group's 34th single, "Kimi no Hohoemi wo Yume ni Miru". In 2015, Matsui's first solo song "Akai Pinhiiru to Professor" was released as one of the new songs for AKB48's sixth studio album Koko ga Rhodes da, Koko de Tobe!.

During the broadcast of AKB48 All Night Nippon on October 21, 2015, Matsui announced that she would terminate her concurrent position in AKB48 Team K after three years to commit herself to SKE48. She subsequently had her last performance at the AKB48 Theater on December 24.

In 2017, Matsui's first self-written song titled "Hana Uranai" was released and included in SKE48's second studio album Kakumei no Oka. Matsui stated that the song consists of her feelings towards her fellow first-generation members. In May, Matsui shared the choreography center position with Sakura Miyawaki for AKB48's commemorative single "Negaigoto no Mochigusare" which was used as the theme song for the junior high school division at the NHK All-Japan School Choir Competition.

=== 2018–2019: Brief hiatus and solo album ===
In May 2018, Matsui was one of the two SKE48 members to participate in the South Korean competition show, Produce 48. On June 16, Matsui collapsed on stage during a concert for the 10th AKB48 general election and had to be carried away to rest before returning. At the end of the night, Matsui was announced as the winner with 194,453 votes and would become the center performer for AKB48's 53rd single. On July 7, SKE48 manager Yuasa Hiroshi released a statement that Matsui would halt all activities to take some time off to recover. Mnet later confirmed Matsui was also withdrawing from Produce 48 where she placed 13th in the voting results of the fifth episode with 329,455 votes. The news of her win and sickness made her one of the three most-searched idols in the first half of 2018 according to Yahoo! Japan.

Matsui resumed her activities on September 6, 2018, and made a surprise appearance at the SKE48 Theater to announce her return. Because of her long hiatus, Matsui was unable to participate in the recording of the song and music video of her winning single "Sentimental Train". Matsui was temporarily replaced by storyboard and CG images in the unfinished version of the music video. On September 25, the full version of both song and music video was released and could be downloaded by CD purchasers with serial numbers included in the CD.

On October 5, 2019, which is also the 11th anniversary of her debut, Matsui released her debut solo album Privacy under label Showroom Records. A pre-release single "KMT Dance" was distributed on August 28, accompanied by a Line Music campaign. All nine tracks in the album were written by Matsui and composed by Yoshimasa Inoue. The release of the album was proposed by AKB48 Group's producer Yasushi Akimoto after witnessing how Matsui's sensitive lyrics and singing voice grabbed fans through her live streams on Showroom.

=== 2020–2021: Graduation from SKE48 ===
On February 7, 2020, Matsui announced her graduation from SKE48. Her graduation concert was scheduled to be held at the Nippon Gaishi Hall on September 26–27 and her farewell performance on October 5 at SKE48 theater, which were eventually postponed due to the COVID-19 pandemic in Japan.

In commemoration of her upcoming graduation, SKE48 and Chukyo TV launched a paid virtual exhibition titled "Jurina's Share Room" which features more than 100 pieces of content taken from her 12 years of career. The special website was opened for a limited time for about three months which was divided into three seasons starting January 9, 2021.

Matsui's last single as a member of SKE48 titled "Koiochi Flag" was released on February 3, 2021. All 68 members of SKE48 participated in the recording of the song and the music video. In addition to that, Matsui also produced a unit named Black Pearl from members who she "felt they would be the future of SKE48". She participated in all aspects, including songwriting, choreography, and styling. Matsui also wrote the lyrics for her graduation solo song "Memories (Itsu no Hi Ka Aeru Made)" (Memories ～いつの日か会えるまで～). The single won first place on the Oricon Singles Weekly Chart. It marked SKE48's 23rd wins on the chart, making the group the fifth female artist who has the most number one positions in the history behind AKB48, Ayumi Hamasaki, Seiko Matsuda, and Nogizaka46.

On April 11, 2021, Matsui's graduation concert was held at the Nippon Gaishi Hall and consisted of two shows - day and night - with two different setlists, with an audience less than 50% of the venue's capacity. Matsui took part in the planning of the concert. The daytime show featured Pro Wrestling Noah's fighters, Naomichi Marufuji, Kaito Kiyomiya, Yo-Hey, and Yoshiki Inamura, as well as performance of several songs originally sung by Matsui's AKB48 senior members. The nighttime show featured her fellow first-generation members of SKE48. Matsui also received congratulatory videos from former AKB48 and SKE48 members, several AKB48 Group members outside Japan, and Kenny Omega. At the end of the concert, Matsui and all members of SKE48 sang "Orange Bus" (オレンジのバス), an unreleased and unrecorded self-written song by Matsui. The solo and instrumental versions of the song were subsequently released as a digital single on May 19.

Matsui had her last performance as a member of SKE48 on April 29 at SKE48 Theater, ending her 13-year career as an idol. However, Matsui only appeared 48 minutes into the show after a series of solo performances of her junior members, to which she said she wanted them to gain experience. At the end of the show, Matsui expressed her intention to be active as an actress and TV personality in the future.

On May 18, 2024, it was announced Matsui would become the "playing manager" for AKB48's Malaysia-based sister group, KLP48, who will debut in August the same year.

== Acting career ==
Matsui had first her first movie and non-AKB48 Group related role by starring in a Nagoya-based movie Waya! Uchuu Ichi no Osekkai Daisakusen in 2011. Matsui and another SKE48 member Kumi Yagami were given roles in the movie after director Kohatsu Yo held an audition for all 57 members of SKE48 at their theater. At the time of the filming, Matsui was only 13 years old, even though her character in the film was 18 years old.

In 2012, Matsui starred in the third episode of the television miniseries Blackboard: Jidai to Tatakatta Kyōshitachi. She played Minami Hirokawa, an honor student who was inspired by the rebellious Masaki that was played by Ryūnosuke Kamiki.

In January 2014, Matsui played as a new secretary to Koichi Sato's character in a special broadcast of the mystery television drama Kagi no Kakatta Heya. In September, Matsui played a supporting role as a part-time maiko in Japan Academy Film Prize-winning musical comedy movie Lady Maiko directed by Masayuki Suo.

In 2015, Matsui starred in the movie Furiko, a live-action adaptation of a flip book-like short animation movie with the same title by comedian Tekken. The movie was screened at the 6th Okinawa International Movie Festival. Matsui played the role of Koharu Hasegawa, the daughter of the main characters, and portrayed her life from middle school to her 20s.

In April 2016, Matsui played the younger version of Miki Nakatani's role in It's Not That I Can't Marry, But I Don't Want To. In July, Matsui cast in her first non-AKB48 Group leading role in the midnight horror drama Death Cash broadcast on TBS. She played the role of Yuka Manami, a college student who was seeking the truth behind a mysterious case involving cursed 10,000 yen cash. SKE48's 20th single "Kin no Ai, Gin no Ai" served as its theme song. On October 2, Matsui announced she would transfer her agency from AKS to Irving to improve her activities in the entertainment world, including acting.

In 2019, Matsui made her acting comeback by guest-starring in TV Asahi's crime drama Emergency Interrogation Room alongside Yūki Amami. She played Hinako Tachibana, a new shogi champion who was suspected of murder. On April 18, Matsui made her debut in a stage play by playing Hamlet in the SKE48 version of Hamlet. Written and directed by Maruo Maruichirō, the stage play is the culmination of acting challenges SKE48 members received from specialists on their variety TV show SKEBINGO!. In 2020, Matsui reprised her role in Kagi no Kakatta Heya Special Edition 3 for a special re-broadcast with additional scenes.

By the time of her graduation as an SKE48 member in 2021, Matsui has starred in many AKB48 Group-related television series, including leading roles in Majisuka Gakuen 2 (2011), Tōfu Pro Wrestling (2017), and Cabasuka Gakuen (2016).

Matsui went on hiatus due to "poor physical condition" in April 2022. Ten months later, she asked her fans to "give [her] more time" for her return through her official Instagram account. She eventually left Irving after her contract expired on December 31, 2023.

== Other ventures ==
=== Endorsements and ambassadorships ===
As a solo artist, Matsui starred in TV commercials for part-time job search app Baitoru alongside her mother in 2015. In 2017, Matsui was appointed as the official ambassador of the Star Wars exhibition at Nagoya Castle that was held from February 16 to April 9. With agency-mate and actress Manami Hashimoto, Matsui has promoted products for online casino game Mystino and real estate company Aoyama Mainland.

==== In sports ====
After playing the role of a pro-wrestling fighter in AKB48 Group drama Tōfu Pro Wrestling, Matsui was appointed as the special ambassador of the New Japan Pro-Wrestling Wrestle Kingdom 12 in Tokyo Dome in 2017. In 2018, Matsui was awarded the Special Award by Tokyo Sports Pro-Wrestling Awards for sharing the wonders of professional wrestling to idol fans and her passion for the sport through her role and social media accounts. Matsui eventually started to be involved in other sports events. In September 2019, Matsui was appointed as an official supporter of combat sport event ONE Championship: Century held in Tokyo. In November, Matsui was appointed as a support ambassador B.League professional basketball team, San-en NeoPhoenix. She stated to have been interested in the team after watching their game in April. In October 2020, Matsui attended the lighting ceremony for Saga Horse Racetrack's night game as one of special judges in the naming of the event. Matsui occasionally served as a guest narrator in various sports promotions including Pro Wrestling Noah and WWE.

=== Radio ===
On April 6, 2019, Matsui started the broadcasting of her first regular radio program titled "Koe no Koibito Matsui Jurina desu supported by Simeji" (声の恋人 松井珠理奈です supported by Simeji) on CBC Radio. The program aired every Saturday at 19:30 JST and ended on December 28.

=== YouTube channel ===
In October 2020, Matsui launched her official YouTube channel. During the first live streaming on November 1, Matsui chose "Jurina House" as the name for the channel out of approximately 80 suggestions received from Japanese and overseas fans.

== Personal life ==
On January 1, 2026, Matsui and Boys and Men member Tatsunori Tsujimoto announced that they are getting married on the same month after dating for three years.

== AKB48 General Election placements ==
Matsui's placements in AKB48's general election, an annual event to decide the promotional lineup or senbatsu (選抜総) of the group's single.

List of placements in AKB48's general election with year, showing number of votes, earned position, and single title
Edition	Year	Rank	Number of votes	Position on single	Single	Ref.
1	2009	19	1,371	Senbatsu	"Iiwake Maybe"	
2	2010	10	12,168	Media Senbatsu	"Heavy Rotation"	
3	2011	14	12,168	Senbatsu	"Flying Get"	
4	2012	9	45,747	Senbatsu	"Gingham Check"	
5	2013	6	77,170	Senbatsu	"Koi Suru Fortune Cookie"	
6	2014	4	90,910	Senbatsu	"Kokoro no Placard"	
7	2015	5	105,289	Senbatsu	"Halloween Night"	
8	2016	3	112,341	Senbatsu	"Love Trip / Shiawase wo Wakenasai"	
9	2017	3	113,615	Senbatsu	"Sukinanda"	
10	2018	1	194,453	Center	"Sentimental Train"	

== Stage credits ==
List of Matsui's participation in SKE48 and AKB48's theatre programs, called stages:

- 2008–2009: SKE48 Team S 1st Stage: "Party ga Hajimaruyo" (PARTYが始まるよ)
  - Unit songs: "Skirt, Hirari", "Hoshi no Ondo" (1st unit) and "Classmate" (2nd unit)
- 2009: SKE48 Team S 2nd Stage: "Te o Tsunaginagara" (手をつなぎながら)
  - Unit songs: "Glory Days" (1st unit) and "Wimbledon e Tsuretette" (2nd unit)
- 2009–2013: SKE48 Team S 3rd Stage: "Seifuku no Me" (制服の芽)
  - Unit songs: "Omoide Ijou" (1st unit) and "Ookami to Pride" (2nd unit)
- 2012: AKB48 Team K 6th Stage: Reset
  - Unit songs: "Kiseki wa ma ni Awanai"
- 2012–2014: AKB48 Team K Waiting Stage
  - Unit songs: "Himawari" (1st unit) and "Candy" (2nd unit)
- 2013–2014: SKE48 Team S 4th Stage: "Reset"
  - Unit songs: "Kiseki wa ma ni Awanai"
- 2012–2014: AKB48 Team K 4th Stage: "Saishuu Bell ga Naru" (最終ベルが鳴る) (Revival)
  - Unit songs: "Return Match"
- 2014–2016: SKE48 Team S 3rd Stage: "Seifuku no Me" (制服の芽) (Revival)
  - Unit songs: "Onna no Ko no Dairokkan"
- 2014–2015: AKB48 Team K 6th Stage: "Reset" (Revival)
  - Unit songs: "Gyakuten Oujisama"
- 2015: AKB48 Team K 4th Stage: "Saishuu Bell ga Naru" (最終ベルが鳴る) (Revival)
  - Unit songs: "Gomen ne Jewel"
- 2016–present: SKE48 Team S 5th Stage: "Kasaneta Ashiato" (重ねた足跡)
  - Unit songs: "Akai Pin Heel to Professor", "Koppu no Naka no Komorebi" (1st unit) and "Hana Uranai" (2nd unit)

== Discography ==
By the time of her graduation in 2021, Matsui had been included in the promotional lineup of all singles of SKE48 except "Sōyūtoko Aru yo ne?" and served as the choreography center for 21 singles, including "Stand by You" which marked the start of the 11th year for the group. Matsui was also featured in the unit Love Crescendo. With AKB48, Matsui had been included in the promotional lineup of 43 singles of AKB48 and served as the center for 6 singles. She was also featured in the units AKBIdoling!!! and NyaAKB.

=== Albums ===
List of studio albums, with selected details
Title	Album details
Privacy	Released: October 5, 2019; Label: Showroom Records; Formats: CD, digital download, streaming; Writer: Jurina Matsui; Composer: Yoshimasa Inoue; Track listing: 1. "Sofa to Cushion" (ソファーとクッション); 2. "monochrome" 3. "Your Hand" (あなたの手); 4. "I Love You" (愛してる); 5. "KMT Dance" (KMTダンス); 6. "Stay with me" 7. "YOLO"; 8. "Kiss from Chu" (チューよりkiss); 9. "Promises That Day" (あの日交わした約束)

=== Singles ===
List of singles, with selected chart positions, showing year released and album name
Title	Year	Peak chart positions		Album
Title	Year	JPN	JPN Hot	Album
"KMT Dance"	2019	—	—	Privacy
"Orange Bus" (オレンジのバス)	2021	—	—	Non-album single
"—" denotes releases that did not chart or were not released in that region.

=== Songwriting credits ===
All credits are adapted from the Japanese Society for Rights of Authors, Composers and Publishers, unless stated otherwise.

Key
‡	Indicates single release

List of songwriting credits, showing year released, artist, label and album name
Song	Year	Artist	Album	Label	Lyrics	Notes
"Hana Uranai"	2017	SKE48	Kakumei no Oka	Avex Trax	Yes	Performed by Jurina Matsui
"Sofa to Cushion" (ソファーとクッション)	2019	Jurina Matsui	Privacy	Showroom Records	Yes	—N/a
"monochrome"	2019	Jurina Matsui	Privacy	Showroom Records	Yes	—N/a
"Your Hand" (あなたの手)	2019	Jurina Matsui	Privacy	Showroom Records	Yes	—N/a
"I Love You" (愛してる)	2019	Jurina Matsui	Privacy	Showroom Records	Yes	—N/a
"KMT Dance" (KMTダンス)‡	2019	Jurina Matsui	Privacy	Showroom Records	Yes	—N/a
"Stay with me"	2019	Jurina Matsui	Privacy	Showroom Records	Yes	—N/a
"YOLO"	2019	Jurina Matsui	Privacy	Showroom Records	Yes	—N/a
"Kiss from Chu" (チューよりkiss)	2019	Jurina Matsui	Privacy	Showroom Records	Yes	—N/a
"Promises That Day" (あの日交わした約束)	2019	Jurina Matsui	Privacy	Showroom Records	Yes	—N/a
"Memories (Itsu no Hi Ka Aeru Made)"	2021	SKE48	"Koiochi Flag"	Avex Trax	Yes	Performed by Jurina Matsui
"Change Your World"	2021	SKE48	"Koiochi Flag"	Avex Trax	Yes	Performed by unit Black Pearl
"Orange Bus" (オレンジのバス)‡	2021	Jurina Matsui	"Orange Bus"	Orange Bus	Yes	Performed with SKE48 at Matsui's graduation concert

== Filmography ==
=== Movies ===
Jurina Matsui's film credits
Year	Title	Role	Director	Ref.
2011	Waya! Uchuu Ichi no Osekkai Daisakusen	Sanae	Yo Kohatsu	
2014	Lady Maiko	Fukuna	Masayuki Suo	
2015	Furiko	Koharu Hasegawa	Norihino Takenaga	

=== Television series ===
Jurina Matsui's television series credits
Year	Title	Role	Network	Notes	Ref.
2010	Majisuka Gakuen	Center	TV Tokyo	Episode 2 & 6	
2011	Mousō Deka!	Detective Mousō	Tōkai TV	Leading role	
2011	Majisuka Gakuen 2	Center	TV Tokyo	Leading role	
2012	Blackboard: Jidai to Tatakatta Kyōshitachi	Manami Hirokawa	TBS	Episode: "Yume"	
2012	Majisuka Gakuen 3	Nobunaga	TV Tokyo	Episode 6-12	
2012	Gakkō no Kaidan	Storyteller	BeeTV		
2013	So Long!	Tsubasa Kurabayashi	NTV	Episode 2	
2014	Kagi no Kakatta Heya Special	Haruka Kiryū	Fuji TV		
2015	Majisuka Gakuen 4	Center	NTV	Episode 9	
2015	Majisuka Gakuen 5	Center	NTV and Hulu	7 episodes	
2016	AKB Horror Night: Adrenaline Nights	Reina	TV Asahi	Episode: "Tunnel"	
2016	It's Not That I Can't Marry, But I Don't Want To	young Miyabi Tachibana	TBS	10 episodes	
2016	Death Cash	Yuka Minami	TBS	Leading role	
2016	Crow's Blood	Shinobu Matsumura	Hulu		
2016	AKB Love Night: Love Factory	Maiko Okabe	TV Asahi	Episode: "Love Ban"	
2016	Cabasuka Gakuen	Center (Kurage)	NTV	Leading role	
2017	Tōfu Pro Wrestling	Matsui Jurina / Hollywood Jurina	TV Asahi	Leading role	
2019	Emergency Interrogation Room Season 3	Hinako Tachibana	TV Asahi	Eps. 2	
2020	Kagi no Kakatta Heya Special Edition 3	Haruka Kiryū	Fuji TV	Re-aired with extra scene	

=== Television shows ===
Jurina Matsui's television shows credits
Year	Title	Role	Network	Notes	Ref.
2016	Genroku Nau: Owari Hanshi 8882-nichi no Tweet	Narrator	NHK General TV	Historical documentary	
2018	Produce 48	Contestant	Mnet	Eps. 1-5	
2021	13-nenkan Otsukaresama Deshita!! SKE48 Matsui Jurina: Zettaiteki Ace ga Sugao ni Modoru Toki	Herself	CS TV Asahi	Jurina Matsui's special graduation program	
2021	Tokumitsu x Jurina no Sport Jiman Dekiru Hanashi	Host	BS NTV		

== Theatre ==
Jurina Matsui's theatre performance credits
Year	Title	Role	Dates	Venue	Ref.
2019	Hamlet (SKE48 ver.)	Hamlet	April 18 – 21, 2019	Shinagawa Prince Hotel Club eX	

== Bibliography ==
=== Photobooks ===
List of photobooks, with publishing year, name of publisher and ISBN, showing chart positions and sales
Year	Title	Publisher	ISBN	Peak chart positions		Sales
Year	Title	Publisher	ISBN	Oricon PB	Oricon Books	Sales
2015	Jurina: Jurina Matsui First Photo Book 松井珠理奈ファースト写真集 「Jurina」	Shueisha	9784087807677	1	6	JPN: 32,722

== Awards ==
- Niconico New Adult Awards: Grand Prize (2017)
- Tokyo Sports Pro-Wrestling Awards: Special Award (2017)
- Yahoo! Japan: "Yahoo! Search Awards" Idol Category (mid-year 2018)
