= Altamira Pictures =

Japanese film studio

Altamira Pictures, Inc.
- Industry: Entertainment
- Founded: September 1993
- Founders: Shoji Masui; Yuji Ogata; Masayuki Suo; Itsumichi Isomura
- Headquarters: Shibuya, Tokyo, Japan
- Products: Motion Pictures, Television Production, Music
- Website: altamira.jp

Altamira Pictures, Inc. was a Japanese film studio established by two producers, Shoji Masui and Yuji Ogata, and two directors, Masayuki Suo and Itsumichi Isomura. The studio produced independent films for small theaters, and eventually created smash hits such as Waterboys and Swing Girls by collaborating with major film distributing companies and television networks.

The studio was a launching pad for new stars such as Satoshi Tsumabuki and Hiroshi Tamaki in Waterboys, and Juri Ueno and Yuika Motokariya in Swing Girls.

Altamira Music was its music arm, which managed musicians such as The Golden Cups.

== Filmography ==
- Shall We Dance? ja:Shall we ダンス？ (1996)
- Close Your Eyes and Hold Me ja:目を閉じて抱いて (1996)
- Takkyu Onsen ja:卓球温泉 (1998)
- Give It All ja:がんばっていきまっしょい (1998)
- Waterboys ja:ウォーターボーイズ (2001)
- Dodge GO! Go! ja:ドッジ GO! GO! (2002)
- Kenshi Hirokane Cinema Theatre Tasogare Ryuseigun Star Restaurant ja:弘兼憲史シネマ劇場 黄昏流星群 星のレストラン (2002)
- Getting Off the Boat at Her Island ja:船を降りたら彼女の島 (2003)
- Gege ja:解夏 (2004)
- Swing Girls ja:スウィングガールズ (2004)
- The Golden Cups One More time ja:ザ・ゴールデン・カップス ワンモアタイム (2004)
- Takada Wataru Teki ja:タカダワタル的 (2004)
- Immortal man Enken vs Budokan ja:不滅の男 エンケン対日本武道館 (2005)
- I Just Didn't Do It ja:それでもボクはやってない (2007)
- Kayokyoku dayo Jinsei ha wa:歌謡曲だよ、人生は (2007)
- Takada Wataru Teki Zero ja:タカダワタル的ゼロ (2008)
- Happy Flight ja:ハッピーフライト (2008)
- Matataki ja:瞬 またたき (2010)
- Dancing Chaplin ja:ダンシング・チャップリン (2011)
- A Terminal Trust ja:終の信託 (2012)
- Robo-G ja:ロボジー (2012)
- Osu! Batayan ja:オース！バタヤン (2013)
- Lady Maiko ja:舞妓はレディ (2014)
- Okāsan no Ki ja:おかあさんの木 (2015)
- Children of Iron ja:鉄の子 (2016)
- Producers ja:プロデューサーズ (2016)
- Happy Wedding ja:ハッピーウエディング (2016)
- Survival Family ja:サバイバルファミリー (2017)
- Synchronizer ja:シンクロナイザー (2017)
- Dance with Me ja:ダンス・ウィズ・ミー (2019)
- Talking the Pictures ja:カツベン！ (2019)
