= Takuya Iwahata =

Japanese voice actor

Takuya Iwabaha (born January 29) is a Japanese male voice actor, singer, and whistler. He is from Hyogo Prefecture. He is affiliated with 81 Produce.

== Early life and career ==
Iwahata (also sometimes spelled Iwabata) was born on January 29 in Hyogo Prefecture, Japan. He started his career with 81 Produce on April 1, 2013.

Outside of voice acting, he is known as a singer and whistler. He can whistle with his teeth.

== Filmography ==
=== Anime in TV ===
Year	Title	Character
2014	PriPara	Boy
2015	Cross Ange: Rondo of Angels and Dragons	Citizen
2015	RINNE of the Boundary	Boy A
2015	Mobile Suit Gundam: Iron-Blooded Orphans	Child soldiers
2015	Naruto: Shippuden	Muyami
2017	Little Witch Academia	John
2017	BanG Dream!	Clerk
2017	Two Car	Male A
2018	Crayon Shin-chan (2018-2023)	Staff member, Deliveryman, Male employee, Toshimoto Kataro (14 years old), Yarisugiru, etc.
2018	Working Buddies!	House mouse, Egyptian flying fox
2018	Nintama Rantarō (2018-2020)	Graduate of the Ninjutsu Academy, Tasogaredoki Ninja, Kamiizumi Hidetoshi, Ninja
2018	Doraemon (TV Asahi version, second season) (2018-2019)	Team member, referee, office worker, head referee, young man, etc.
2018	Kira Kira Happy Hirake! Cocotama	Tsubasa Obata
2020	White Cat Project ZERO CHRONICLE	Theo

=== Anime in Film ===
- Crayon Shin-chan: Burst Serving! Kung Fu Boys ~Ramen Rebellion~ (2018, Young Adult)
- Crayon Shin-chan: Honeymoon Hurricane ~The Lost Hiroshi~ (2019, Kamenzoku)
- Crayon Shin-chan: Shrouded in Mystery! The Flowers of Tenkasu Academy (2021, Grumbling Male Student)
- Ganbatte Ikimasshoi (Male student, 2024)

=== OVA ===
- Kyō, Koi o Hajimemasu (2012, part-time worker, male 1)
- Age 12. (2014, Male 2) - Included as a supplement in the May 2014 issue of ' Ciao ' magazine.

=== Web Anime ===
- The Unfortunate Female Executive, Black General (2017, narration, combatant)

=== Video games ===
- Phantom Thief Nocturne (2016, The Phantom Thief Navehide)
- Captain Tsubasa: Dream Team (2017, Pepe)
- Winning Hand (2018, Battle Beetle)
- Jikkyou Powerful Pro Baseball 2018 (2018, Tamura-kun No. 2)
- Duel Masters Place (2019, Aqua Charger)
- Final Fantasy VII Remake (2020)

=== Dubbing ===
==== Film ====
- Wet Hot American Summer
- We Don't Belong Here (2017, Davey, Austin Abrams )
- A Taxi Driver (2018, Goo Jae-sik ( Ryu Jun-yeol ))

==== Television ====
- The Walking Dead (Carl Grimes)
- My Love from the Star (2014, Bomb)

==== Animation ====
- Ultimate Spider-Man (2012, Iron Spider)
- Thomas the Tank Engine (2014, Timothy)
- Thomas the Tank Engine: The Brave Ones and the Monsters of Sodor (2015, Timothy (trailer, TV broadcast version), Docks worker)
- Incredibles 2 (2018)
- Thomas & Friends: Go! Go! Earth Adventure (2019, Timothy)

=== CM ===
  - Teasing Master Takagi-san (2016, Nishikata-kun)
