= Kusakari =

Kusakari (written: 草刈) is a Japanese surname. Notable people with the surname include:

- Masao Kusakari (草刈 正雄, born 1952), Japanese actor and model
- Tamiyo Kusakari (草刈 民代, born 1965), Japanese ballet dancer and actress
