= 1st Japan Film Professional Awards =

Japanese film awards in 1992

- Date: March 13, 1992
- Site: Shinjuku Cine Pathos, Tokyo, Japan

The 1st Japan Film Professional Awards (第1回日本映画プロフェッショナル大賞) is the 1st edition of the Japan Film Professional Awards. It awarded the best of 1991 in film. The ceremony took place on March 13, 1992, at Shinjuku Cine Pathos in Tokyo.

== Awards ==
- Best Film: Manatsu no Chikyū
- Best Director: Osamu Murakami (Manatsu no Chikyū)
- Best Actress: Tomoko Nakajima (Dance till Tomorrow)
- Best Actor: Masahiro Motoki (Asobi no Jikan wa Owaranai)
- Best New Director: Sadāki Haginiwa (Asobi no Jikan wa Owaranai)
- Special: Shozin Fukui (964 Pinocchio)

== 10 best films ==
1. Manatsu no Chikyū (Osamu Murakami)
2. Asobi no Jikan wa Owaranai (Sadāki Haginiwa)
3. Dance till Tomorrow (Itsumichi Isomura)
4. Skinless Night (Rokurō Mochizuki)
5. Misty (Toshiharu Ikeda)
6. World Apartment Horror (Katsuhiro Otomo)
7. Roujin Z (Hiroyuki Kitakubo)
8. 964 Pinocchio (Shozin Fukui)
9. Hiruko the Goblin (Shinya Tsukamoto)
10. Zeiram (Keita Amemiya)
