= Give It All (film) =

- DVD cover

Japanese name
- Kana: がんばっていきまっしょい
Transcriptions
- Revised Hepburn: Ganbatte Ikimasshoi
- Directed by: Itsumichi Isomura
- Screenplay by: Itsumichi Isomura
- Based on: Ganbatte Ikimasshoi by Yoshiko Shimura
- Produced by: Shōji Masui; Masayuki Suo; Akifumi Takuma
- Starring: Rena Tanaka; Ren Osugi
- Cinematography: Yuichi Nagata
- Edited by: Hani Mituhashi
- Music by: Lee Tzsche with Penguins
- Production companies: Fuji Television; Pony Canyon; Altamira Pictures
- Distributed by: Toei Company
- Release date: October 10, 1998 (Japan)
- Running time: 120 minutes
- Country: Japan
- Language: Japanese

Give It All (Japanese: がんばっていきまっしょい, Hepburn: Ganbatte Ikimasshoi) is a 1998 Japanese film directed by Itsumichi Isomura, based on the novel of the same name by Yoshiko Shikimura.

== Cast ==
- Rena Tanaka as Etsuko Shinomura
- Mami Shimizu as Atsuko Nakazaki
- Wakana Aoi as Rie Yano
- Kirina Mano as Taeko Kikuchi
- Emu Hisazumi as Mayumi Nakaura
- Tomoko Nakajima as Akiko Irie
- Ryoko Moriyama as Satoko Shinomura
- Hakury as Kensaku Shinomura
- Ren Osugi as Principal of Iyo Higashi High School

== Awards and nominations ==
20th Yokohama Film Festival

- Won: Best Director as Itsumichi Isomura
- Won: Best Cinematography as Yuichi Nagata
- Won: Best Supporting Actor as Ren Osugi
- Won: Best Newcomer as Rena Tanaka
- 2nd Best Film

== See also ==
- Ganbatte Ikimasshoi (TV series)
