= Yoshikazu Suo =

Japanese musician

Yoshikazu Suo (周防 義和, Suo Yoshikazu; born in 1953) is a Japanese musician from Tokyo, Japan. He has composed and arranged music for films and dramas, among others.

== Filmography ==
=== Films ===
- Abnormal Family: Older Brother's Bride (1984)
- Fancy Dance (1989)
- Sumo Do, Sumo Don't (1992)
- Shall We Dance? (1996)
- Tsuribaka Nisshi Eleven (2000)
- Tokyo Marigold (2001)
- Drugstore Girl (2004)
- Shinibana (2004)
- I Just Didn't Do It (2007)
- A Terminal Trust (2012)
- Lady Maiko (2014)
- Talking the Pictures (2019)

=== Anime ===
- Air
- Battle Athletes Victory
- I'm Gonna Be An Angel!
- Magical Girl Pretty Sammy
- Melody of Oblivion
- Mistin
- Shamanic Princess

== Awards ==
- 2014 - 69th Mainichi Film Award for Best Music (Lady Maiko)
- 2014 - 38th Japan Academy Prize for Best Music (Lady Maiko)
