= Kumiko Takeda =

Japanese actress (born 1968)

- 武田 久美子
- Born: August 12, 1968 (age 56); Nagoya, Japan
- Occupation: Actress
- Years active: 1981–present
- Children: 1

Kumiko Takeda (武田 久美子, Takeda Kumiko, born August 12, 1968) is a Japanese gravure model and actress. In the 1980s and 1990s she gained significant popularity with her topless and nude picture books, during which time she also performed in movies where she would do body revealing and sex scenes.

== Personal life ==
Takeda was married to an American from 2000 until divorcing in 2016. She currently lives with her daughter in San Diego.

== Filmography ==
- Shuffle (1981) - Girl in playground
- High Teen Boogie (1982 aka "Haithīn bugi") - Momoko Miyashita
- Tropical Mystery: seishun kyowakoku (1984)
- A Promise (1986 aka "Ningen no yakusoku") - Naoko, Yoshio's daughter
- Aidoru wo sagase (1987)
- 24 Hour Playboy (1989 aka "Ai to heisei no iro - Otoko") - Yuri Nodate
- Gurenbana (1993) - Yoko
- If: Moshimo (1993) TV series
- Zero Woman III: Keishichō 0-ka no onna (1996 aka Zero Woman: Assassin Lovers) - Rei
- Me wo tojite daite (1996 aka "Close Your Eyes and Hold Me") - Hanabusa
- Ghost School: Teacher Mako's Head (1997 aka "Reikai gakkō: Mako sensei no kubi")
- 24 jikan dake no uso (1999 TV) - Yukari Sakai
- Big show! Hawaii ni utaeba (1999)
- Fly Me to the Saitama (2019)
