= Ganbatte Ikimasshoi (TV series) =

- がんばっていきまっしょい
- Genre: Drama, school, sports, romance
- Created by: Kaneko Arisa
- Starring: Anne Suzuki; Ryo Nishikido
- Opening theme: Kirakira (Aiko)
- Country of origin: Japan
- Original language: Japanese
- No. of episodes: 10

Production
- Producer: Shigemitsu Keiichi
- Production company: Kansai Telecasting Corporation

Original release
- Network: FNS (KTV, Fuji TV)
- Release: July 5 – September 13, 2005

Ganbatte Ikimasshoi (がんばっていきまっしょい, "Give It All) is a Japanese television drama series for KTV based on the novel of the same name by Yoshiko Shikimura, about a girl who wants to start an all-girl rowing team. To do so she needs to find at least four other members. She is met with many challenges during each episode, e.g., finding enough members, bearing the weight of being captain, going through training, and experiencing some setbacks. With the help of her coach, childhood friend Sekino Hiroyuki (Nishikido Ryo), and the boys' rowing team, she and her team are able to overcome those obstacles. Ganbatte Ikimasshoi is a sports drama about hope, hard work, and perseverance.

== Synopsis ==
Etsuko Shinomura, at first glance, seems to be a courageous and active girl. Actually, she has low self-esteem but hides it by acting boldly. She's a typical teenager who is interested in rowing. Etsuko lives with her family: her always cheerful mother, her father who runs a dry cleaning shop, and her lighthearted grandmother. Four years ago, her older sister entered the prestigious Kyoto University. Since childhood, Etsuko hated being compared with her smart sister. Although she successfully entered the famous Matsuyama High School this spring, she soon falls behind the others. One day, she happens to see four boys from the school's boat team rowing in unison. This sight lights a fire in Etsuko's heart, and she is determined to establish a girl's boating club. The problem is, not only does she hate sports, she also has anemia. Despite her difficulties, she actively takes part in forming a new club.

Hiroyuki Sekino is Etsuko's neighbor and a member of the boy's boat team. He used to be overweight, but now he's a tall, handsome young man. He has a lot of friends because of his friendly personality. Hiroyuki is always in a good mood. What his friends don't know is that when he was a member of his middle school's soccer club, the pressure caused him to have a breakdown. At home, his parents' attention always went to his smart young brother. Etsuko has an uneasy feeling when she finds out how much girls at school like Hiroyuki. When they were kids, Hiroyuki and Etsuko never got along. Always fighting and quarreling, Hiroyuki once pushed Etsuko off a jungle gym. What Etsuko doesn't know is that Hiroyuki always has had a crush on her.

Saburo Nakata belongs to the rugby club. His tall figure and handsome looks capture the girls' attention at school. Contrary to his idol-like looks, Saburo is a serious and dedicated guy. Brought up in an all-female family, he's seen plenty of the negative side of women. That's why Saburo is a bit timid when it comes to romance. He's not only brilliant, he's also a great athlete and is hoping to enter the prestigious Tokyo University. His dream is to get a job that will touch people's hearts. Saburo's "never give up" attitude is a positive influence on Etsuko and the girls who tend to give up easily.

Rie Yano is the typical honor student. She shoulders the burden of her parents' expectations and is aiming to enter a national university and go to medical school. Rie is moved when she sees how dedicated and passionate Etsuko is when it comes to the girl's boat club, and decides to join the club herself. She has a tough time balancing her studies and club activities, but with her rich knowledge of Science, Rie makes a big contribution as a member of the maintenance crew. As the expert mechanic, she makes her presence on the team felt by all.

Taeko Kikuchi stands out in the boat team with her bright-colored hair and pierced ears. Before joining the team, her strong personality gave the false impression that Taeko was the leader of a group of juvenile delinquents. But when she became friends with Etsuko and was moved by her passion for boats, Taeko joins the team. Soon, she becomes an essential member of the team. Her only weak point is that she's short-tempered.

Hitomi Ohno was the star member of the award-winning girl's squad when Matsuyama High School previously had a girl's boat team. When Etsuko asks Hitomi to coach her team, she happily accepts, and teaches the girls the excitement of rowing. Hitomi's husband Ken, is the coach of the boy's boat club and still active in boat rowing. They've been married for four years, but Ken's worries about continuing the sport has created a gap between the couple.

Yukio Shinomura is Etsuko's father and the owner of a dry cleaning store. He takes pride in what he does and refuses to buy computers and other new equipment for his store. Yukio likes to do it the old-fashioned way. While Yukio is always displaying his love and affection for Etsuko's elder sister, he seems strict when it comes to Etsuko. He often calls her a good-for-nothing, but Etsuko doesn't know that her father says these things to hide his true feelings. Yukio loves Etsuko more than anybody and cares for her greatly. He soon becomes the leader of the group cheering for Etsuko's boat club.

== Cast ==
- Suzuki Anne as Shinomura Etsuko (Etsune)
- Nishikido Ryo as Sekino Hiroyuki (Bu)
- Hiroki Uchi as Nakata Saburo (1-2)
- Taguchi Junnosuke as Nakata Saburo (4-)
- Aibu Saki as Yano Rie (Ri)
- Iwasa Mayuko as Kikuchi Taeko (Dakko)
- Satsukawa Aimi as Nakazaki Atsuko (Hime)
- Fujimoto Shizuka as Nakaura Mayumi (Imocchi)
- Takabatake Kasumi as Onishi Kayo
- Tsuchiya Shiho as Ichihara Fumie
- Ikeuchi Hiroyuki as Ono Ken
- Ishida Yuriko as Ono Hitomi
- Yuki Saya as Uriu Mizuki
- Seki Megumi as Tanaka Chiemi
- Hojo Takahiro as Yasuda Kyoichi
- Aijima Kazuyuki as Fukuda Shoichiro
- Kikuchi Kinya as Sano Reiji
- Tomochika as Nemoto Midori
- Asami Reina as Shinomura Noriko
- Hanahara Teruko as Shinomura Kinu
- Ichige Yoshie as Shinomura Tomoko
- Kohinata Fumiyo as Nemoto Mitsuru
- Osugi Ren as Shinomura Yukio
- Matsumoto Kana as Doi Shinri
- Mitamura Shun (boy's rowing club member)

== See also ==
- Give It All
