= Waya! Uchuu Ichi no Osekkai Daisakusen =

2011 film by Kohatsu Yo

- Promotional Poster in Japan
- Directed by: Kohatsu Yo
- Starring: Jurina Matsui; Yagami Kumi
- Distributed by: Go cinema
- Release date: 29 October 2011 (Japan)
- Running time: 101 minutes
- Country: Japan
- Language: Japanese

Waya! Uchuu Ichi no Osekkai Daisakusen (WAYA！ 宇宙一のおせっかい大作戦) is a 2011 Japanese film. It is directed by director Kohatsu Yo and stars SKE48 members Jurina Matsui and Yagami Kumi, and comedian Itoda Jun.

== Plot ==
Kantaro decides to plan a big event in honor of Shige, the arcade’s chairman and a person who has been running a wooden clog shop for 30 years. However, his true objective is to reconcile Shige and his friend Nobu after they have a fight.

But Kantaro’s little white lie ends up growing, turning his meddlesome plan into a mess.

== Cast ==
- Itoda Jun as Kantaro
- Yazaki Shigeru as Shige, a stubborn old man who is runs a wooden clog shop at the Endouji shopping arcade.
- Jurina Matsui as Sanae, the granddaughter of Shige.
- Yagami Kumi as a high school student
- Lou Oshiba as Nobu, Shige's friend. They previously had a fight and became estranged.
- Ozawa Kazuhiro
- Miki Mizuno
- Fujita Tomoko
- Moro Morooka
- Miwa Mizuki
- Kojima Noriko
- Matthew Lott as Peter, an immigrant who works at a bakery in the Endouji shopping arcade.

== Production ==
Waya! Uchuu Ichi no Osekkai Daisakusen was first announced on 26 July 2011. It will be directed by the director Kohatsu Yo, who previously directed the film Chikujo seyo!.

Director Kohatsu Yo held an audition for all 57 SKE48 members at their theater in Nagoya. In the end, members Jurina Matsui and Yagami Kumi were selected for roles in this film. This will be the first time that either of them will star in a film. Jurina Matsui starred as the granddaughter of Shige. At the time of the filming, Matsui was only 13 years old, even though her character in the film is 18 years old. Yagami Kumi will also play the role of a character 2–3 years older than her. She remarked that "the feeling of playing the role of an elder sister to Jurina Matsui is a little strange".

== Release ==
Waya! Uchuu Ichi no Osekkai Daisakusen will first be released in Nagoya cinemas on 29 October 2011. It will then be released at a later date in other parts of Japan.

== See also ==
- SKE48
