= Manatsu no Chikyū =

- DVD cover
- 真夏の地球
- Directed by: Osamu Murakami
- Screenplay by: Yuhei Enoki
- Story by: Osamu Murakami
- Produced by: Masao Tanaka
- Starring: Kikuchi Kenichirō; Eri Fukatsu; Michitaka Tsutsui; Yoshiyuki Yamaguchi; Kiwako Harada; Toshiyuki Nagashima
- Cinematography: Junichi Fujisawa
- Edited by: Yoshiyuki Okuhara
- Production company: Director's Company
- Release date: June 1, 1991 (Japan)
- Running time: 106 minutes
- Country: Japan
- Language: Japanese

Manatsu no Chikyū (Japanese: 真夏の地球; lit. Earth in Midsummer or Midsummer's Earth) is a 1991 Japanese youth drama film directed by Osamu Murakami. It was released in Japan on June 1, 1991.

== Cast ==
- Kikuchi Kenichirō
- Eri Fukatsu
- Michitaka Tsutsui
- Yoshiyuki Yamaguchi
- Kiwako Harada
- Toshiyuki Nagashima

== Reception ==
At the 1st Japan Film Professional Awards, it won the award for best film and Osamu Murakami won the award for best director. At the 15th Japan Academy Prize, Yoshiyuki Okuhara was nominated for Best Film Editing.
