= Dance till Tomorrow =

Japanese manga series

- First volume cover

あさってDANCE (Asatte Dansu)
- Genre: Romantic comedy; Sex comedy
- Manga
- Written by: Naoki Yamamoto
- Published by: Shogakukan
- English publisher: NA: Viz Media
- Magazine: Big Comic Spirits
- English magazine: NA: Pulp
- Original run: 1989 – 1990
- Volumes: 7
- Live-action film
- Directed by: Itsumichi Isomura
- Produced by: Shōji Masui
- Written by: Masahito Kagawa
- Music by: Masaru Watanabe
- Studio: Daiei Film
- Released: June 22, 1991
- Runtime: 91 minutes
- Original video animation
- Directed by: Teruo Kogure; Masamune Ochiai
- Written by: Sheila Nakajima; Tomohiro Maruyama
- Music by: Tetsuya Nakamura
- Studio: Knack Productions
- Released: 1990 – 1991
- Runtime: 45 minutes
- Episodes: 2
- Live-action film
- Directed by: Ryūichi Honda
- Written by: Yūji Takagi
- Studio: Tornado Film
- Released: December 1, 2005

Dance till Tomorrow (Japanese: あさってDANCE, Hepburn: Asatte Dansu; lit. "Day After Tomorrow Dance") is a Japanese manga series written and illustrated by Naoki Yamamoto. It is a romantic comedy which details the life of Suekichi Terayama, a student who will inherit a fortune when he graduates from college and gets married with unexpected complications from a mysterious girl, Aya Hibino.

The manga was originally serialized in Shogakukan's Big Comic Spirits magazine from 1989 to 1990. The first five volumes were published in the now-defunct adult manga magazine Pulp, and the rest were released afterward under Viz's Editor's Choice line. It has also been adapted into two live action films, and in a two-episode original video animation (OVA).

== Characters ==
=== Main ===
Suekichi Terayama
A student who takes part in an acting troupe, Bondage Horse. Originally from a small island, his parents are lighthouse keepers. His life is changed dramatically when he finds out he has been left a secret inheritance from his great-grandfather: a stamp collection worth millions of yen. However, he can only claim the inheritance on condition that he graduates from college, marries and establishes a career.
Aya Hibino
A kindergarten teacher lacking modesty and propriety who left her husband. She accidentally stumbles in Suekichi's life at his grandfather's funeral and learns of his secret inheritance, and quickly begins a sexual relationship with him.
Miyuki Fukagawa
Originally hired by Suekichi's lawyer to break up Aya and Suekichi. Miyuki needed money to prevent her family home from being repossessed. She orchestrates an "accidental" meeting with Suekichi and joins his acting troupe, eventually starting a sexual relationship with her, and convincing him that she is pregnant. Although Suekichi learns that Miyuki was hired by his lawyer, he still professes his love for her and agrees to marry her. Before the wedding Miyuki realizes that this was a sham and cancels the wedding. She finally takes on a job as Tachima's personal assistant.

=== Other ===
Naruhito Munakata
Aya's husband, who works for the National Mint. Aya leaves him a few months after their wedding, and he is determined to get back together with her. Later in the series, he wins an award for the diaries he kept concerning his feelings towards Aya, which were edited and published by Suekichi's nosy cousin Sue.
Ikezu
The lead actor of the drama troupe. A slacker-type who works at a convenience store, he is often involved in affairs with various women.
Masami Shimomura
She is the leader of the drama troupe, and Suekichi has a crush on her in the beginning of the series. She has been friends with Ikezu for a long time, and according to him, she is a twenty-seven-year-old virgin.
Mr. Tachimi
Suekichi's lawyer and the manager of his trust fund. He is always looking out for Suekichi's best interests, and is convinced that Aya is after him only for the inheritance. He looks upon marriage as a form of prostitution.
Freddy
A Southeast Asian man who Aya brings home one day to live with Suekichi. For most of the series he knows very little Japanese, and is often used as a comic-relief character. At the end of the series, after learning proper Japanese and establishing a career as a gameshow host, he goes back to his home country and returns ten years later at Genichiro's funeral. He is known for shouting the word "pussy" as a greeting, since when he arrived in Japan Aya told him that that was the way to greet people in Japanese.
The Reasonable Yakuza
A gangster whose office is located above the Bondage Horse theater troupe. He becomes a regular patron of the troupe after they sell him tickets half-price to their show to make up for the noise they made while practicing. Later on, he asks Suekichi to hold on to a handgun that the police are looking for. He even hides out at Suekichi's apartment, and Aya paints his skin so that he resembles Freddy. During this time, he works for Bondage Horse for a brief period of time, using scare tactics to sell tickets for their show.
Daikichi Terayama
Suekichi's deceased great-grandfather, who left him the inheritance. But even in death he does not rest: He has too much fun haunting Suekichi at the most inopportune moments and peeping on or possessing people.
Genichiro
A wealthy old man that Aya meets while working at a nightclub. She ends up marrying him so that she can live off of his money. Though he considers himself a sickly old man about to die, his death does not occur until 10 years later.

== Production ==
Dance till Tomorrow was described as "boy-meets-girl-story" by Yamamoto, who created it just following a trend among young-adult comic magazines. He declared, "I must have unconsciously put myself inside some boundary, thinking I had to do some thing like that." Nevertheless, he tried to have an alternative to the common place "mediocre happy ending" and the "tearjerker separation" on its conclusion. After ending it, "[he] felt like [he]'d done enough in a commercial genre".

The character of Aya Hibino was not based on any real person, although her thick eyebrows were inspired by idols' style in the 1980s. Yamamoto said she was meant to be a femme fatale and "probably somehow represents [his] own deep-seated feelings of not being able to understand women".

== Media ==
=== OVA ===
An OVA was produced and released in 1990 under the title "Asatte Dance" and in 1991 under the title "Asatte Dance 2".

Voice Cast

- Kikuchi Masami

- Sasaki Yuko

- Takasugi Sho

- Oizumi Akira

- Otsuka Yoshitada

- Ogata Kenichi

- Umezu Hideyuki

- Sakurai Toshiharu

Staff

Director: Kogure Teruo (Asatte DaNcE), Ochiai Masamune (Asatte DaNcE2)

Screenplay: Shimazaki Shiira (Asatte DaNcE), Maruyama Tomoe (Asatte DaNcE2)

=== Manga ===
Dance till Tomorrow was originally serialized in Shogakukan's Big Comic Spirits magazine between 1989 and 1990. Shogakukan later compiled its individual chapters into seven tankōbon published between September 1989 and February 1991. It was re-released twice; Yudachi-sha published seven volumes from March to September 1994, while Ohzora Publishing released it into four volumes between November 25, 1998, and February 17, 1999. It was licensed to North America by Viz Media and serialized in its adult oriented magazine Pulp from the first issue in December 1997 to the last issue in August 2002. After having already released five volumes through Pulp, the last two volumes were published in straight-to-graphic-novel format in Editor's Choice line.

No.	Original release date	Original ISBN	English release date	English ISBN
1	September 1989	4-09182-051-4	September 1998	1-56931-321-0
Suekichi meets a mysterious woman (Aya) who he believes is only after his secret inheritance. The first performance of the troupe is a success even after Aya accidentally sells some tickets to the local yakuza.
2	December 1989	4-09182-052-2	June 1999	1-56931-379-2
Aya's ex-husband offers Suekichi 1 million yen to break up with Aya. When Aya finds out the Suekichi was considering the deal this leads to a breakup. They meet again and reconcile, however a chance encounter with Aya's ex-mother-in-law explains one of the reasons Aya divorced her husband. Aya and Suekichi spend the 1 million yen on an extravagant holiday by the seaside.
3	March 1990	4-09182-053-0	February 2000	1-56931-471-3
Aya explains to Suekichi the reasons she got divorced from her ex-husband. Miyuki is hired by Suekichi's lawyer to break up Aya and himself.
4	June 1990	4-09182-054-9	January 2002	1-56931-668-6
Suekichi begins to fall for Miyuki. He also discovers that he may not rightful heir to secret inheritance.
5	October 1990	4-09182-055-7	April 2002	1-59116-004-9
Suekichi is faced with the prospect that both Aya and Miyuki may be pregnant. Miyuki leaves Suekichi on the day of their wedding.
6	December 1990	4-09182-056-5	May 2003	1-56931-830-1
After deciding to move in with Suekichi, Aya gets a job at a nightclub, where she meets Genichiro, a wealthy old man that she plans to marry. Suekichi poses as her brother, against his will, and meets with Genichiro over dinner to discuss the plans for marriage. Aya and Suekichi then go on a vacation to the island where Suekichi grew up on.
7	February 1991	4-09182-057-3	October 2003	1-56931-984-7
After the fight on the island, Aya and Suekichi break up. With Genichiro's money financing the production, Suekichi feels he has lost in role as part of the troupe. After the final performance Suekichi begs Aya not to marry Genchiro. She storms out and Suekichi's plans to prevent the wedding is thwarted by Aya's ex-husband. After the wedding Suekichi returns to the island for 10 years, only coming back for Genichiro's funeral where he meets Aya again. They get drunk and end up naked in the bed. The next morning Aya introduces Sueikichi to his son.

=== Adaptations ===
It was adapted into a two-episode original video animation (OVA) by Knack Productions that was directed by Teruo Kogure and Masamune Ochiai. The first part, produced in 1990, was released on VHS on July 25, 1991 while the second video was released at an unknown month in 1991.

In 1991, studio Daiei Film adapted it into a live-action film directed by Itsumichi Isomura, starring Tomoko Nakajima and Tamotsu Ishibashi and released on June 22. It was released on VHS by Daiei on November 25, 1991, and then re-released on January 14, 1994. This production was elected the third best film of the year at the 1st Japan Film Professional Awards.

1991 film Produced and released in 1991 under the same title. Produced and distributed by Daiei.

Cast Hibino Aya: Tomoko Nakajima

Terayama Suekichi: Tamotsu Ishibashi

Fukagawa Miyuki: Nae Yuki

Karawara Koki: Bengal

Shimomura Masami: Mako Ishino

Ikezu Hajime: Harunori Nakajima

Terayama Daikichi: Akira Emoto

Tatemi Lawyer: Ren Osugi

Hasegawa: Shun Sugata

Barber Shop Owner: Yoshikazu Ebisu Yu Tokui, Houka Kinoshita, Maiko Ogawa, Ryo Okubo, Zico Uchiyama and others

Staff:

Director: Itsumichi Isomura

Producer: Shoji Masui

Screenplay: Masahito Kagawa

Music: Masaru Watanabe

Theme song: Mermaid Vivid "For Me"

Cinematography: Yuichi Nagata

Editing: Junichi Kikuchi

Art: Hiroshi Tazawa

Lighting: Akinaga Toyomiyama

Sound: Kazuyoshi Kawashima

Sound mixing: Mitsuo Chabata

Assistant director: Hajime Yamakawa

Production manager: Sasaki Yoshino

Development: IMAGICA

Planning: Ken Takeuchi

Producer: Kai Shimada

Production cooperation: Daiei Eiga, Fathers Corporation

In November 2005, a live-action film directed by Ryūichi Honda, based on the series and starring Hiroaki Matsuda and Ai Kurosawa, was announced. A trailer was released on its official site on December 5 to promote the film, which debuted on December 10. Divided into four segments it was released as a DVD box set on March 23, 2006, as well as four individual DVDs on April 26, 2006. This adaptation was released in North America under the title Naughty Gold Diggers by Asian Media Rights on November 27, 2012.

== Reception ==
Adam Arnold, writing for Animefringe magazine, described it as "a sex comedy that puts anything on TV to shame." Jason Thompson, author of book Manga: The Complete Guide, wrote "Yamamoto's art has a gangly, hand-drawn look, and the whimsical, self-referential story provides opportunities for surreal, artsy humor." Thompson concluded calling it "loosely plotted but enjoyable and unpredictable." Author Shaenon K. Garrity declared it is "almost too smart to be a manga: it's cheerfully cynical, it's self-aware, there's real sex… and the characters feel real and unforced." Garrity praised the first two volumes as "especially amazing, a comedy balancing act of money, sex, and power" and how Yamamoto developed and its characters. Inside Pulse's Jimmy Lin praised its characterization, as Yamamoto created "wackos, weirdos, and other kooks", and said it "hits an emotional key… when it takes on its soap-opera notes." Lin commented that "even at his most tangentally [sic] cogent, Yamamoto draws you in and keeps you in with his strong sense of character and weird sense of humor and story."
