= Matataki =

2010 Japanese film by Itsumichi Isomura

- Film poster
- 瞬
- Directed by: Itsumichi Isomura
- Screenplay by: Itsumichi Isomura
- Story by: Ren Kawahara
- Produced by: Tatsuya Iwakura
- Starring: Keiko Kitagawa; Masaki Okada; Nene Otsuka; Kin Sugai
- Production companies: Stardust Pictures; Altamira Pictures
- Release date: June 19, 2010 (Japan)
- Running time: 110 minutes
- Country: Japan
- Language: Japanese

Matataki (Japanese: 瞬), also known as Piecing Me Back Together, is a 2010 Japanese drama film directed by Itsumichi Isomura.

== Plot ==
Izumi (Keiko Kitagawa) loses her boyfriend Junichi (Masaki Okada) in a fatal motorcycle accident. As a result of the shock, she suffers recurring nightmares, depression and post-traumatic stress disorder, as well as losing her memory from the time of the accident. A lawyer named Makiko (Nene Otsuka) helps Izumi to remember the final time her boyfriend was alive.

== Cast ==
- Keiko Kitagawa as Izumi Sonoda
- Masaki Okada as Junichi Kono
- Nene Otsuka as Makiko Kirino
- Kin Sugai as An old woman
