= 民代 =

民代, may refer to:

- Full named "民意代表", which means "legislator" for Chinese
- Tamiyo Kusakari (草刈 民代; born 1965), Japanese actress and dancer

== See also ==
- Tamiyo (disambiguation)
