= Okāsan no Ki =

- Poster
- おかあさんの木
- Directed by: Itsumichi Isomura
- Written by: Itsumichi Isomura
- Produced by: Takao Tsuchimoto; Shintaro Horikawa; Makoto Okada; Kazuma Kuryu
- Starring: Kyōka Suzuki; Mirai Shida; Takahiro Miura; Takehiro Hira; Seiichi Tanabe
- Cinematography: Tokushō Kikumura
- Edited by: Hani Mituhashi
- Music by: Toshiyuki Watanabe
- Production company: Altamira Pictures
- Distributed by: Toei Company
- Release date: June 6, 2015 (Japan)
- Running time: 115 minutes
- Country: Japan
- Language: Japanese
- Box office: ¥38.9 million (Japan)

Okāsan no Ki (Japanese: おかあさんの木; lit. "Mother's Trees") is a 2015 Japanese war drama film directed by Itsumichi Isomura. It was released in Japan on June 6, 2015.

== Cast ==
- Kyōka Suzuki
- Mirai Shida
- Takahiro Miura
- Takehiro Hira
- Seiichi Tanabe
- Kazuki Namioka
- Tomohiro Ichikawa
- Yoneko Matsukane
- Yoshiki Arizono
- Daikichi Sugawara

== Reception ==
On its opening weekend, the film earned ¥38.9 million at the Japanese box office.
