= I'm Gonna Be An Angel! =

Japanese anime television series

- Key visual

天使になるもんっ! (Tenshi ni Narumon!)
- Genre: Fantasy; Romantic comedy
- Created by: Heaven Project; Hiroshi Nishikiori
- Anime television series
- Directed by: Hiroshi Nishikiori
- Produced by: Iku Saitō; Shinichi Ikeda; Kazuhiko Ikeguchi
- Written by: Mamiko Ikeda
- Music by: Yoshikazu Suo
- Studio: Studio Pierrot
- Licensed by: NA: Synch-Point
- Original network: TXN (TV Tokyo)
- Original run: April 7, 1999 – September 29, 1999
- Episodes: 26
- icon

I'm Gonna Be An Angel! (Japanese: 天使になるもんっ！, Hepburn: Tenshi ni Naru mon!) is a Japanese anime television series conceptualized by Hiroshi Nishikiori and produced by TV Tokyo, Yomiko Advertising & Bandai Visual and animated by Studio Pierrot. It is directed by Nishikiori, with Mamiko Ikeda handling series scripts, Hiromi Katō designing the characters, Seimei Maeda being in charge of mechanical design and Yoshikazu Suo composing the music. The series was licensed for release in the United States by Synch-Point, but its domestic distribution license has since expired. The American DVD release was never completed, due to poor marketing and distribution, and thus, poor sales.

== Plot ==
The story follows Yuusuke Kamoshita, who is living alone until he stumbles across a naked girl in a forest, a very energetic girl named Noelle. Noelle and her entire family proceed to move into Yuusuke's tiny home, replacing it with a huge plastic-looking castle, and disrupt his life. Shortly into the series, Yuusuke writes a note to his crush Natsumi Suzuhara apologizing for a few "incidents", in which he also exclaims that she is an angel to him. Noelle later finds the note and decides she wants to be Yuusuke's angel. Silky and her minions interfere as the series goes on.

== Characters ==
Noelle (ノエル, Noeru)
Voiced by: Tomoko Kawakami (Japanese); Diana Kou (English)
Noelle is an energetic angel in training. She shows great affection towards Yuusuke and is determined to become an angel. She often devises ways of taking off on a short runway, the roof of the house, in order to fly which is important on being an angel. She has vowed to marry Yuusuke once she has completed her training to becoming an angel for Yuusuke. At the end of the series, she and Yuusuke show that they love each other very much.
Yuusuke Kamoshita (鴨下 祐介, Kamoshita Yuusuke)
Voiced by: Issei Miyazaki (Japanese); Steve Blum (English)
Yuusuke is admired by Noelle but does not return her affection initially. He too is overlooked by the girl he has a crush on, Natsumi. He is passive and can do little when Noelle and her monster-like family move into his lonely house. He tries to keep quiet about their residence when he is not in the house and tries to keep things from turning chaotic within the house. At first he didn't agree with being Noelle's husband but in the end, he falls in love with Noelle.
Natsumi Suzuhara (鈴原 夏海, Suzuhara Natsumi)
Voiced by: Yukana Nogami (Japanese); Jodi Tannar (English)
Natsumi is Yuusuke's classmate, whom he has a crush on. She is an athletic diver. She is often spied upon by Yuusuke and his classmates from a small window at the diving complex at their school. She has a serious personality. She has a boyfriend named Kai, who wears glasses, and seems older than she does. Kai was her brother's best friend, and ever since his death, she had substituted Kai as her brother. She has had encounters with an angel, her deceased brother Fuyuki, which is proven later to be Raphael at the very end of the series.
At the beginning she seems to dislike Yuusuke because she believes he is a pervert, but later begins to get attracted to him.
Papa (パパ)
Voiced by: Juurouta Kosugi (Japanese); Ricardo Ibarra (English)
Papa is Noelle's father, and is a Frankenstein monster-like creature. He has a calm demeanour. He usually calls Yuusuke "son in law".
Mama (ママ)
Voiced by: Noriko Hidaka (Japanese); Jessica Stenuis (English)
Mama is Noelle's mother. She is the most normal, though absent minded, member of the family of monsters, although she shows another side of herself in one episode (she's actually a crazy witch).
Granny (おばあちゃん, Obā-chan)
Voiced by: Tomoko Naka (Japanese); Hettie Lynne Hurtes (English)
Granny (Baba) is Noelle's grandmother and is a witch. She strongly dislikes humans and, therefore, is against Noelle wanting to marry Yuusuke.
Gabriel (ガブリエル, Gaburieru)
Voiced by: Nobutoshi Hayashi (Japanese); Jonas Ball (English)
Gabriel is Noelle's older brother, and is a vampire. He enjoys teasing Yuusuke, and has horribly bad allergies to cats. When Miruru becomes the maid of the family Gabriel eventually gets used to her.
Sara (サーラ, Sāra)
Voiced by: Ayako Kawasumi (Japanese); Rose Bomrungchati (English)
Sara is Noelle's older sister. She has the power to turn invisible, and spends a lot of her time in this form. Others find it hard to tell when she is there or not, and she also becomes attracted to Yuusuke. Later in the series when she meets Mikael she falls in love with him- but he and Raphael are a couple.
Lucca (ルカ, Ruka)
Voiced by: Ikue Ohtani (Japanese); Jennifer Seltzer (English)
Lucca is Noelle's younger sister, and is an elven-looking creature. She is a mad scientist, and often makes different mechanical devices to help Noelle learn to fly and become an angel. In one of the episodes when she meets up with Eros she gets interested in him because of his speed. When Eros tells her his speed is due to his love for Silky, she thinks it is a silly idea because of her obsession for science.
Dispel (ディスペル, Disuperu)
Voiced by: Mitsuo Iwata (Japanese); Hisato Masuyama (English)
Dispel is the initial antagonist of the series, or so the audience is led to believe. He has several henchmen who he dispatches to thwart Noelle's attempts to become an angel and often treats his slave Silky unkindly. At the end of the first season, it is seen that he was a toy of Silky's. He is destroyed by her, and Silky takes his place as the series' main antagonist.
Silky (シルキー, Shirukī)
Voiced by: Hiroko Konishi (Japanese); Jennifer Sekiguchi (English)
Originally when Dispel appeared to be in control, Silky seemed to be a dominated slave. During the second season it is revealed that she was strong willed and is more scheming and power hungry than Dispel was. Silky's intentions are unclear though she sends her minions to interfere with Noelle's training at every opportunity. At the end of the series, it is revealed that Silky, Mikael, and Noelle grew from three parts of a shattered angel-egg. So they must all become angels together or not at all. Silky does not want to become an angel which is why she is resisting the efforts of Noelle. At the end, Silky is dragged against her will to join the other two and become angels. Noelle persuades her to accept this.
Miruru (ミルル)
Voiced by: Mayumi Iizuka
Miruru, a catgirl, originally appears to be one of Dispel's henchmen but is revealed to be Dispel's daughter later in the series. She is in love with Gabriel, but because of his allergy to cats, he initially hates her. After the first season when Dispel is destroyed she becomes free of him and dedicates herself to being the maid of the house and stays with the family.
Muse (ミューズ, Myūzu)
Voiced by: Sakura Tange
Muse is a shapeshifter whose ability is limited to changing into inanimate objects. She is a reluctant henchmen and only obeys orders so that she is not punished. She is never successful on her missions and is punished anyway, however. Noelle and the others never seem to notice that she is around which is partially due to her shapeshifting ability and partly due to her ineptness at interfering. She is madly in love with Eros and will doing anything he orders. She can be a bit of a crybaby at some points.
Eros (エロス, Erosu)
Voiced by: Omi Minami
Eros is a demon-like creature that is a henchmen just as Muse is. He doesn't seem to notice Muse's affection towards him, instead going out of the way to please Silky and win her affection. Along with Muse, he bumps into Ruka in one episode and befriends her.
Mikael (ミカエル, Mikaeru)
Voiced by: Akira Ishida (Japanese); Sonny Strait (English)
Mikael is a puzzling character in the beginning of I'm Gonna Be An Angel. In the beginning of the anime, it is apparent that he shares an intangible relation with Noelle, even to the extent in which he is capable of speaking to her through telepathy. He encourages her to become an angel. He carries the Book of Chaos, in which the text fills a single page for each instance in which Noelle accomplishes an angelic deed. He seem to be in a romantic relationship with Raphael.
Raphael (ラファエル, Rafaeru) /Fuyuki Suzuhara (鈴原 冬雪, Suzuhara Fuyuki)
Voiced by: Shoutarou Morikubo
Raphael is an angel whose foremost physical feature is a singular wing. He is a professor at the Angel School with Mikael as his student. He cannot be seen by most of the human world, with Noelle, Mikael, and Natsumi as exceptions and only Mikael can touch him. However, he does influence certain events of the series, in particular rescuing Noelle, Yuusuke, and child Natsumi when he grants Noelle the temporary power of flight as they fall from the clock tower in episode 13. He is benevolent and willing to assist Mikael and Noelle in their quest to become angels, and he has a romantic relationship with Mikael.
Shinobu (忍先生)
Voiced by: Mami Kingetsu (Japanese); Kelli Tager (English)
She is Noelle and Yuusuke's class teacher in school.
Masaru (マサル)
Voiced by: Kousuke Toriumi (Japanese); Sonny Strait (English)
One of Yuusuke's classmate.
Saiki (斉木)
Voiced by: Souichiro Hoshi (Japanese); Moe Gans-Pomerantz (English)
Yuusuke's classmate who wears glasses.

== Episodes ==
No.	Title	Directed by	Written by	Original release date
1	"Kisses Mean I Like You, I Think"; Transliteration: "Kisu wa suki tte kimochi, kamo" (Japanese: キスはスキってきもち、かも)	Hiroshi Nishikiori	Mamiko Ikeda	April 7, 1999
Yuusuke meets Noelle in a forest naked and accidentally kisses her which leads to him becoming her (apparent) future husband. Later after school ends, he finds his home transformed with Noelle and her family moved in.
2	"Patched Up Love is Okay with Me"; Transliteration: "Tsugihagi darake no koi datte ii" (Japanese: ツギハギだらけの恋だっていい)	Hiroshi Nishikiori	Mamiko Ikeda	April 14, 1999
Yuusuke's feelings are rejected when he writes an apology letter to Natsumi, Noelle gets kidnapped by a fat rubbery man and Yuusuke and Papa rescue her.
3	"Hug Me, Squeeze Me"; Transliteration: "Daite, gyutto ne" (Japanese: 抱いて、ギュッとね)	Tōru Takahashi	Mamiko Ikeda	April 21, 1999
Gabriel is on a walk and runs into Miruru, who has come to the human world for some fun. Yuusuke leaves the house, not able to deal with the chaos anymore. He goes to the park where he sees Natsumi with a guy (maybe a boyfriend?). Meanwhile, Noelle is determined to become an angel for Yuusuke so she asks all her family members how to become an angel. Her grandmother tells her angels must give up all their desires, telling Noelle that she has to stop "squeezing" Yuusuke if she ever wants to become an angel. Later at school, Noelle shows up in a full-body suit, made by Lucca, that flings her across the room if she tries to come into contact with Yuusuke, who is very concerned over Noell's wellbeing. After one incident, Noelle falls unconscious and Yuusuke takes her to the Nurse's office. When they leave school, Yuusuke finds a letter in his show locker from Natsumi, telling him to meet her at the pool that night. He sneaks out and it turns out to be a trap set by Miruru, who is working for Dispel. She summons a bunch of Kappa in the pool and they create a whirlpool with the intent of killing Yuusuke so Noell will give up on trying to become an angel. However, Noelle had noticed that Yuusuke was gone and came to the rescue, diving into the whirlpool (while still in the repelling suit) to try and save Yuusuke who is stuck in the center of the whirlpool, unable to move. Noelle's desperation to save Yuusuke causes her halo to flash and expand, breaking the suite binding her. It cuts to Yuusuke having to give Noelle CPR and then he carries her home.
4	"Precious Things are Precious..."; Transliteration: "Taisetsu na mono, taisetsu na..." (Japanese: 大切なもの、大切な......)	Hiroshi Nishikiori	Mamiko Ikeda	April 28, 1999
Yuusuke has a cold, but the monster family argues over what "really" ails him! Papa thinks he needs to shed some skin, Grandma thinks he is cursed, and Gabriel has no idea what he is saying. Noelle goes to school on her own after Yuusuke tells her angels have to go to school, and she discovers a new word - Precious! Not sure what it means, she asks their teacher and Natsumi gets mad at Noelle for wasting class time with stupid questions. After school, Miruru reappears and gets Noelle to go with her to have some yummy food that will "bring her happiness," and Noelle wants to share it with Yuusuke! Another battle ensues before Noelle accidentally drops the Jasmine Jelly she had wanted to give to Yuusuke, whose fever broke and he tells her he appreciates the thought.
5	"Not there but still there" Transliteration: "Mienakute, soko ni ite" (Japanese: 見えなくて、そこにいて)	Hiroshi Nishikiori	Mamiko Ikeda; Hiroshi Nishikiori	May 5, 1999
It is vacation time and everyone is going to the beach! After a short argument between Papa and Gabriel, Mama decided it is the beach or nothing. Arriving, Mama immediately forces everyone to play beach volleyball. Yuusuke and Noelle escape with the excuse of going to get drinks for everyone, but Noelle gets distracted by a crab so Yuusuke goes on alone. He comes across a strange shop where the girl behind the counter is wrapped in bandages (though we only ever see her arms). Later, Grandma scared Yuusuke by enchanting the fire to chase him and he ends up back at the shop, which is closed now. The girl from earlier is back though and he discovers that it was actually Sara! She tells Yuusuke her reason for being invisible and then says she wants him to see her. She becomes visible but before Yuusuke can say anything, Noelle screams in the distance. She is being attacked once again by some monsters sent by Dispel. Yuusuke runs off to save her while Sara stands, dejected but fully visible. Yuusuke and Noelle get kidnapped by the monsters and they are taken up in the airship. Sara tries to tell the rest of the family but nobody will listen to her. She becomes so angry that she yells for them to stop playing around and becomes visible, shocking everyone into silence. Sara tells them about Yuusuke and Noelle and they go save the kids. Once everyone is safe, Papa "properly" introduces his oldest daughter Sara to Yuusuke.
6	"Hearts have wings and stuff" Transliteration: "Kokoro ni tsubasa, toka ne" (Japanese: ココロに翼、とかね)	Hiroshi Nishikiori	Mamiko Ikeda	May 12, 1999
The episode opens with Natsumi's dream. She seems to have a brother who died and we find out that the guy she was with in the second episode is called Kai. Meanwhile, Noelle is going to fly! This episode she tries out a new invention from Lucca, but things don't go so well. Yuusuke finds out that Noelle thought that anything that can fly is an angel and isn't sure how to set her straight. Then Noelle goes to Natsumi, asking her to teach Noelle how to fly. Natsumi is irritated and annoyed at Noelle's behavior and finds herself running and hiding from the relentless ball of energy. When Noelle tries the high dive, Yuusuke and Natsumi become concerned and Natsumi jumps in to save Noelle after her failed dive. Noelle saw Natsumi smile underwater and celebrates while Natsumi denies having done so. In the background of the episode, Miruru is hanging out with the monsters who are supposed to help capture Noelle, but Milk Boy and Cow are so moved by the scene at the pool that Milk Boy decided rather than being a villain, he wants to become a Sumo Wrestler, so there isn't actually a fight this episode. In the end of the episode, Yuusuke tries to explain angels (and what they do), saying that angels always know what to do to make someone feel better. Natusmi is still convinced that people cannot fly.
7	"A Bond That's Really Strong"; Transliteration: "Kizuna ppoi kankei, kana" (Japanese: キズナっぽい関係、かな)	Hiroaki Sakurai; Hiroshi Nishikiori	Mamiko Ikeda	May 19, 1999
A squid claiming to be Noelle comes to the house. She's trying to boot the real Noelle out but the monster family is so mixed around that they just accept her into the family. Yuusuke is getting real tired of putting up with the crazy antics of this family and just wants to have some privacy and is egged on by the new house maid who tells him he's the normal one and that he needs to stand up for himself. He tries to speak up but it always interrupted. Squid-Noelle convinces Noelle to leave the house so Yuusuke won't have to leave (Yuusuke having given up his bowl at dinner to Noelle when Squid-Noelle took her bowl). Mikael speaks to Noelle while she's hanging out at a park and convinces her to not hold back. The new house maid turns out to be Miruru in disguise (which explains Gabriel's itching the whole episode - he's allergic to cats). Miruru and the Squid were working together to get rid of Noelle, but since the family was so accepting of her (Papa even went out and found a special bowl just for Squid) Squid feels really bad about deceiving them. Miruru takes Squid and runs off, Papa and Gabriel going to save her while Yuusuke goes to find the real Noelle. Miruru is trying to fry the Squid and Noelle shows up to save the day, Yuusuke saving her when she's attacked. They all head back home but Squid says she has to go find a fiancé for herself, telling Noelle that she and Yuusuke look cute together. Later, the family receives a letter from Squid who is having a great time with her new fiancé.
8	"I Wanna See You, but It Hurts"; Transliteration: "Aitakute, itakute" (Japanese: 会いたくて、痛くて)	Hiroshi Nishikiori; Jirō Fujimoto	Mamiko Ikeda	May 26, 1999
Lucca has created a fighting robot to prepare for their next fight and nobody can decide who will be the first to pilot it. The special pilot suit lands in Noelle's hands so she puts it on and is the pilot. They go out and practice while Miruru spies on them from a distance. Meanwhile a mama robot and her baby are still sad about the papa robot who was defeated by the gang in an earlier episode. Miruru uses this to her advantage, convincing the mama robot to take revenge on Noelle and the others for killing her husband. While Noelle is taking a beating from mama robot, Lucca reveals a second robot that picks its own pilot, this time Yuusuke being chosen. However, this robot runs out of power quickly into the fight so Yuusuke isn't much help. Then the family has the bright idea of bringing the papa robot back to life to appease the mama robot. Everyone is teary eyes and touched by the reunion but poor Yuusuke is still stuck in the powered down robot.
9	"No Doesn't Always Mean No"; Transliteration: "Dame wa dame janakute" (Japanese: ダメはダメじゃなくて)	Goe Gug-jeo	Mamiko Ikeda	June 2, 1999
Granny doesn't want Noelle to marry an "impure human" so she goes off in a huff when the family starts discussing marriage plans (ignoring Yuusuke's objections). Miruru and Granny team up to try to get Yuusuke out of the picture (Miruru telling Granny that she loves Yuusuke and wants him for herself). So the newest robot has a ukulele that can turn people into frogs. Slowly each family member is turned into a cute little frog until Yuusuke is the only one left (Miruru betrayed Granny so even she is a frog) and has to figure out how to save everyone. He thinks you have to look into the ukulele's eyes but it is the strings that hold the magic.
10	"The Thing at the End of the Tunnel"; Transliteration: "Ana no mukou ni mieru mono tte" (Japanese: 穴のむこうに見えるものって)	Takeshi Ushigusa	Mamiko Ikeda	June 9, 1999
Natsumi has a fight with Kai. Yuusuke and Noelle go to a festival and Noelle receives a little creature called Bunbun ("Boonboon"), who supposedly will turn into an angel with 7 color wings if it is taken care of properly. Yuusuke has a bad feeling about the little guy though since it refuses to let Noelle sleep in Yuusuke's room and she even left for school without him the next morning. When it goes cray and eats all the food at the table when Noelle runs off to get some napkins, Yuusuke is convinces Bunbun is bad news, but Noelle refuses to believe him. When Yuusuke yells at her to get rid of it, Noelle seems like she is about to say "I hate you!" but instead says "I still love you!" so Miruru pops out, disappointed that her plan to break up Yuusuke and Noelle did not work. Bunbun then goes berserk and drills holes into the walls of the house, making the whole thing look like Swiss cheese. Bunbun goes after Noelle and Yuusuke saves her. Lucca then fixes the old Bunbun into a proper, non-evil, creature and Noelle celebrates.
11	"It's Suddenly Time to Say Goodbye"; Transliteration: "Futo, sayonara no toki" (Japanese: ふと、サヨナラのとき)	Nobuhiro Kondō; Jirō Fujimoto	Mamiko Ikeda	June 16, 1999
A comet is coming and it has got Mikael worried for Noelle. Yuusuke and Natsumi are chosen to be the class representatives on the committee for the school's Durian festival to celebrate the comet (that looks like a durian fruit). Yuusuke has a chat with Kai, learning about the relationship between Kai, Natsumi, and Natsumi's dead brother Fuyuki. Kai was always in love with Natsumi but she only ever saw him as Fuyuki's friend, then when Fuyuki died she started to hang around Kai more (likely using him as a replacement for Fuyuki). Mikael speaks to Yuusuke, telling him to not let Noelle out of his sight and Yuusuke goes to find her. She's with Lucca at the school's clock tower, they were going to use the comets power to help Noelle fly, but the clock started to wing backwards, catching the hose attached to Noelle's mechanical wings and lifting her into the air. Yuusuke arrives just then and helps get her down before running up the clock tower to see what was happening. When he gets there, he finds Natsumi, but she's become a child again!
12	"To Like is to be Liked?"; Transliteration: "Suki wa suki ni natte morau koto?" (Japanese: 好きは好きになってもらうこと？)	Yoshiko Shima	Mamiko Ikeda	June 23, 1999
Child Natsumi is staying with Yuusuke and the others at his house. He tells the school he, Noelle, and Natsumi all got sick and his friends take over the committee positions, but they're not buying the sudden sickness and pay Yuusuke a visit. So Yuusuke comes clean and tells them about Natsumi and his friends say they'll help him cover it up as long as he can find the cure. Yuusuke tries to take Natsumi back to the clock tower to find clues but she refuses and runs off. Later, Noelle remembers seeing Natsumi at a grave and that's where they find her. Yuusuke tries to explain to Natsumi that she has to let her brother go, he's never coming back, and she'll stay a child forever if she can't accept that, but all this does is make Natsumi mad at and scared of Yuusuke. She retreats into the (weird) hole in Yuusuke's room, covering it with cardboard and refusing to come out, throwing stuff at Yuusuke when he tries to go in. Meanwhile, Noelle is practicing on the room of the school with the heavy mechanical wings for the day the comet comes. Sara and Gabriel seem a little concerned that Yuusuke is spending so much time and energy on Natsumi, and Lucca tries to point out to Noelle that Yuusuke would probably rather become Natsumi's angel than for Noelle to become him, but Noelle doesn't seem to understand what Lucca is trying to say. On the day of the festival, Yuusuke is fed up with Natsumi hiding and goes to get her out, but she's ready and runs up to the roof. Yuusuke has a heart to heart with her, he explained how at first he thought they had the same kind of sadness over losing people they love, but he'd realized that they were different pains after all (since he is still able to actually see and speak to his parents since they're not dead, unlike Natsumi's brother). Yuusuke and Natsumi both decide to make a wish on the Durian comet to wish for Natusmi to be able to see Fuyuki again.
13	"Round 'n Round and Back at the Start"; Transliteration: "Mawarimichi shite modotte kuru no" (Japanese: 回り道して戻ってくるの)	Hiroshi Nishikiori; Jirō Fujimoto	Mamiko Ikeda	June 30, 1999
At the festival, Granny is running a fortune telling stand. She sees Mikael walking past and invites him in. We discover that Granny knows who Mikael is (or at least knows he's been encouraging Noelle's endeavor to become an angel) and tells him to leave Noelle alone. Yuusuke and child-Natsumi are on their way to the festival to make their wish. Miruru is confronted by Dispel, who has come to capture Noelle himself. He tries to kill Miruru but Gabriel steps in and saves her. He realizes that he's not itchy and theorizes that since he drank Miruru's blood (a few episodes ago) he's immune to his cat allergy now. The comet is over head and Noelle is preparing to run like her and Lucca had been practicing, when Dispel drops in and throws Lucca through the clock tower before chasing after Noelle who tried to run away. Yuusuke and Natsumi had been on their way to the top of the clock tower to make their wish when Lucca came crashing through. Yuusuke's friends and their teacher see Dispel going after Noelle and throw their durian's at him to try and slow him down. Noelle and Dispel end up at the top of the clock tower. Yuusuke tries to help but gets blown off the building. He's trying to hold on to both the building and Natsumi while Dispel tries to kick him off. Yuusuke and Natsumi fall and Noelle jumps after them. There's a flash of light, Noelle's halo flashing and expanding, and her mechanical wings take flight, enabling her to save Yuusuke and Natsumi, all three of them safely landing on the ground. Dispel, believing that he failed in preventing Noelle from becoming an angel, leaves. Natsumi, who had a vision of her brother telling her to let him go and move on, has turned back into her normal self to Yuusuke's relief. Back at the lair, Dispel is upset and Silky, his supposed slave, tells him Noelle isn't an angel yet and says she's bored now. She was apparently in charge the whole time, Dispel just being a doll. Back at the school, Mikael is trying to figure out what happened and sees a one-winged angel on the hands of the clock tower. It is Raphael, a teacher at the angel academy. Mikael is upset that Raphael helped Noelle (she didn't become and angel, Raphael gave her the power she needed to fly for that moment) because he says she'll never become an angel if she can't learn. Raphael flies over to the roof with Mikael and pretends to have a coughing fit, leaning on Mikael for support. Mikael, concerned, is disgruntled to find out Raphael was tricking Mikael (just to get a hug from the shorter angel?). Raphael agrees to stop helping, but says he wants to look over Noelle with Mikael instead. The next day, Noelle is trying to fly again by jumping off the room, with no results. Everyone is concerned and tries to get her to stop, but she is still determined to become Yuusuke's angel.
14	"Because Promises Are in the Heart"; Transliteration: "Yakusoku wa kokoro no naka ni aru kara" (Japanese: 約束は心の中にあるから)	Kiyotaka Ōhata	Mamiko Ikeda	July 7, 1999
The episode opens with Silky repeatedly writing the character for "Angel", just for the sake of crumpling up the papers and stomping on them. A new character, Eros, asks her if she really hates angels that much, which Silky confirms, voicing her contempt for the fact that Noelle wishes to become one. Eros (who shows romantic interest in Silky) agrees to stop Noelle from becoming an angel. Meanwhile, Miruru has started living with everyone at Yuusuke's house as a self-proclaimed maid, only adding to the chaos and further frustrating Yuusuke. In a fit of rage, Yuusuke tells Noelle that he hates angels and demons, causing her to make the decision to give up on becoming an angel for his sake. Due to a lie that Yuusuke's friends told Natsumi regarding the events leading up to the Durian Comet, Natsumi believes that she was in a coma, and Yuusuke took care of her, which restores a good deal of her trust in him. Mikael (partly due to teasing by Raphael) shows concern over Noelle having given up, and reveals that the Book of Chaos is actually a record of her actions toward becoming an angel, and that when the book is completed, her wish will be granted--although this isn't enough for Noelle to change her mind. A monster sent by Eros appears and demands that Noelle sign a document stating that she will stop trying to become an angel, and although Noelle agrees, she refuses to sign. The monster chases Noelle into the classroom (Yuusuke following suit) and accidentally destroys the document, vowing to return. Yuusuke and Noelle embrace, and he apologizes for telling her that he hates angels, which reinvigorates her dream to become one. Eros attempts to apologize to Silky for failing, but is not forgiven. Mikael and Raphael move in together in an apartment across the street from Yuusuke's house, to continue watching over Noelle. The episode ends with an un-shown character named "Muse" tearfully vowing to succeed where Eros failed.
15	"Something That's Too Far to Reach"; Transliteration: "Tōkute tōkute todokanai mono" (Japanese: 遠くて遠くてとどかないもの)	Nanako Shimazaki	Mamiko Ikeda	July 14, 1999
Noelle shuts off Yuusuke's alarm, causing the two of them to have to rush out for school. Mikael (who is also running late due to Raphael not waking him up) runs in to Noelle and Yuusuke outside, and meets the rest of Noelle's family, who are curious of their new neighbor. Sara develops a crush on Mikael. At school, Yuusuke and Noelle are punished for being late, and so their teacher puts them in charge of showing around a transfer student named Muse. Muse is visibly upset, even crying multiple times during the tour, and attributes this to the fact that she has had a very limited socialization, and has never attended school or had friends before. Noelle and Yuusuke offer to be friends with her. Meanwhile, Silky wonders when she'll find her Prince, and Eros tries to cheer her up by revealing his new plan to keep Noelle from becoming an angel, although this only bothers Silky more. Muse visits Noelle and Yuusuke at their house after school, and asks to see Noelle's room, as she's never seen the room of another girl her age. Although, once alone, Muse transforms into a mirror, and tries to incite Noelle to be vain by asking her who the prettiest girl in the world is, expecting for Noelle to say herself. The plan backfires, as Noelle isn't vain, so Muse takes a different route by stirring up Sara's insecurity relating to her crush on Mikael, knowing that Noelle cannot become an angel if she fails to save her sister from succumbing to her own vanity. Because Muse tricks Sara into thinking Mikael will like her if she's thinner, Sara begins dieting and working out, causing her family to worry. Mikael, who had been keeping an eye on them from across the street, comes to help, and eventually helps Sara break out of her insecurity. Muse flees the scene, promising to succeed next time.
16	"Feelings That Cannot Be Answered"; Transliteration: "Kotae no denai kimochi datte aru" (Japanese: 答えの出ない気持ちだってある)	Setsuo Takase	Ryōta Yamaguchi	July 21, 1999
After receiving failing grades on their tests, Yuusuke, Noelle, and Yuusuke's friends are given an ultimatum: pass a make-up test, or have their parents called in to school to discuss their academics (which Yuusuke vehemently objects to). They are also given the task of delivering Natsumi's homework and informing her of the make-up test, as she had been out sick. Natsumi comes to greet her classmates, but ultimately kicks them out after Noelle embarrasses her. Back at home, Sara baked cookies as an excuse to invite Mikael over, and he inevitably gets roped into tutoring Noelle and Yuusuke (although, the frequent distractions from Noelle's family members further complicate things). Muse drops in to study as well, and comes up with another plan to prevent Noelle from becoming an angel. However, Muse's plans quickly get turned around when Noelle's family (who came to apologize for her poor grades) find their way into the testing room and wreak havoc. Eventually, Muse transforms into an Ema and tries to throw Noelle out of focus by pressuring her, and giving baseless advice to those taking the test. HOwever, in the end, Noelle manages to complete the test on her own, which, in turn, inspires Natsumi just the slightest bit (despite the fact that Noelle didn't actually answer the questions, instead drawing hearts and writing "I love Yuusuke" on the otherwise blank sheet).
17	"Untying and Tying"; Transliteration: "Hodoitari, musundari, ne" (Japanese: ほどいたり、結んだり、ね)	Yoshiko Shima	Hiroko Hagita	July 28, 1999
While Mama cuts heads of lettuce with her guillotine, seemingly troubled, Papa and Noelle talk about the Red String of Fate. Papa claims that he and Mama have a red string of fate keeping them together, and asserts that Noelle and Yuusuke are the same, although Mama seems uncomfortable with this. In class, Noelle ties hers and Yuusuke's fingers with a literal red string, and Natsumi turns up her nose at them, saying she doesn't believe in such superstitions. Muse accidentally breaks the thread, causing her and Noelle to cry, but their teacher assures them that a true red string will never break. Silky wonders where her prince is, and Eros chastises Muse (who seems to have feelings for Eros) and instructs her to take Noelle's halo. Mama still seems troubled, spacing out and accidentally vacuuming things at random, then runs off in tears when she realizes what she's done. Sara reveals that Mama's behavior could be due to a possible love letter she received earlier, causing Papa to panic. Muse turns into a cushion that's softer and kinder than Mama, and comforts Papa (as well as giving him bad advice) in hopes to steal his heart while he's vulnerable. Due to Muse's bad advice, Papa insult's Mama's cooking, furthering the rift between them, which, in turn, causes Noelle to cry over her fear of her parents' red string breaking. Papa is being comforted by Muse when Mama finds them, and is convinced by Muse that Papa is leaving their family to start a new life with her, instead. A tug-of-war over Papa breaks out with Muse on one side, and the rest of the family on the other. The family wins, and Papa and Mama make up and apologize to one another. Mikael and Raphael discuss the potential that Noelle might have to sacrifice something big in order to become an angel. Meanwhile, Noelle finds Mama's letter, and the source of her stress--an invitation to the Demon World Witches' Tournament.
18	"Having Both Is Bad?"; Transliteration: "Docchi mo hoshii ha ikenai no?" (Japanese: どっちもほしいはイケナイの？)	Jirō Fujimoto	Mamiko Ikeda	August 4, 1999
The invitation Mama received to the Witches' Tournament shown in the last episode has reignited her long-buried past--a past that she had set aside in favor of raising a family. However, Noelle sees her flying her broom late at night, and Mama explains that she has dreamed her whole life of being invited to the Witches' Tournament, but ultimately must choose her family over her dreams. Eros and Muse devise a way to convince Mama to enter the tournament (and subsequently divide her family) in order to have Noelle disqualified from becoming an angel on the grounds that she couldn't save her parents' marriage. In the form of a vacuum cleaner, Muse stokes Mama's feelings of unrest, causing Mama to give in and revert to her 'real' personality, becoming brash and rude in place of her usual demure and gentle attitude. At Noelle's insistence, Mama offers to teach her how to fly--forcing her to do strange and ineffectual exercises, which she then reveals actually had no meaning at all, but were merely a way to break Noelle down and keep her from trying again. Despite how bleak things appear to be, in the end, Mama makes up with her family and gives up on the tournament, her agitation now satiated after being able to cut loose and fly.
19	"Power of Love"; Transliteration: "Ai no chikara" (Japanese: アイのちから)	Kiyomi Matsuda	Michiko Yokote	August 11, 1999
Lucca finishes her newest invention to help Noelle fly: the "Bu Bu Bloomers". With the bloomers, Noelle will be able to fly using (oddly enough) the power of her own farts, as they're converted into energy by the machine. Unfortunately, Noelle can't fart on command, so Lucca sets out to buy her some roasted sweet potatoes to speed up the process. Coincidentally, Eros is also on a mission to buy roasted sweet potatoes for Silky in hopes of currying her favor. And, what's more? Mikael and Raphael are selling sweet potatoes from a cart in order to earn money to pay their rent. Lucca and Eros race to the cart, and Eros wins, buying every last sweet potato, much to Lucca's frustration (mostly due to the fact that she believes Eros has a machine that helps him run as fast as he does). This frustration causes Lucca to temporarily give up on the bloomers project, instead focusing all her energy on finding out the secret to Eros's speed. Meanwhile, Eros--whose attempt at wooing silky with the potatoes was wildly unsuccessful--has returned to find better sweet potatoes to make up for his failure. Lucca ends up challenging him to a potato-digging battle, and although she is using a machine she designed, the two manage to keep pace. That is, until Muse shows up. Muse, who is in the form of a food cart, is furious with Eros's failure to notice her feelings, and takes this anger out by eating all of the potatoes, making it impossible to determine a clear winner. In the end, Eros returns home to be scorned yet again by Silky, Lucca has a new-found hope in the power of love, and Muse is left alone, seemingly heartbroken.
20	"Close Dream, Far Person"; Transliteration: "Chikai yume, tōi hito" (Japanese: 近いゆめ、遠いひと)	Yoshiko Shima	Michiko Yokote	August 18, 1999
Noelle has a strange nightmare. At the same time across the street, Mikael is studying how to be an angel. Raphael praises him, but reminds him of the consequences of becoming an angel--namely leaving earth behind, and never seeing or being able to interact with your loved ones again. After saying this, Raphael disappears, and Mikael searches, but cannot find him. Instead, Mikael finds Noelle at the park, and becomes perturbed when she begins interacting with Raphael, as he can neither see nor hear the angel. Still, he tries to play it off as if nothing is wrong in front of Noelle, only blowing up at Raphael when she leaves to go make them jasmine jelly. But, despite his outburst, Raphael does not reappear, and Mikael is left completely alone. Unable to take it any longer, Mikael packs his things and leaves the apartment, telling Raphael that he does not plan to return. However, just as Mikael is leaving, Noelle returns with a gigantic plate of jasmine jelly, and Raphael finally re-appears to Mikael. As Noelle (and her family) are running toward them with the jelly, Papa slips, causing everyone to fall. Raphael runs to catch Noelle, but she falls right through him, revealing the fact that he is intangible to her (a fact which seems to be a tremendously sore spot for him). Back in their apartment, Mikael and Raphael discuss Mikael's uncertainty with becoming an angel, along with his lifelong assignment of protecting Noelle, and how much that means to him.
21	"There Are Untrue Truths"; Transliteration: "Honto ja nai honto mo atte" (Japanese: ホントじゃないホントもあって)	Urara Hidaka	Ryōta Yamaguchi	August 25, 1999
Miruru stumbles upon a wedding on her way back from the supermarket, which inspires her to try and plan a marriage between herself and Gabriel. Although the family is excited, Grammy has her doubts, as she knows that Miruru is in the human world illegally, and will be deported and unable to see Gabriel for hundreds of years if she's caught. This realization causes Miruru to panic and kidnap Gabriel, hoping to outrun the consequences of her illegal stay. The family chases after her, and they're eventually joined by Muse, who takes the form of a rocket in an attempt at taking out Noelle. As they continue to argue, Cerberus, a deportation officer, finds them, and explains that he's been receiving reports of an illegal demon in the area. He doubts the family, as they are not actually blood-related, and decides to arrest Noelle under suspicion of being the one he's searching for. A flashback showing the first scene in the show reveals that the stork Nekhbet attacked had been carrying a yellow, ball-shaped object, that had broken into three pieces upon hitting the ground, and one of these pieces had become Noelle as a baby. From there, Papa and the family had joined and raised Noelle, who had no idea of her lineage. Yuusuke attempts to stop the officer and implores Miruru and Muse to come clean and take their punishment, but the two (along with a kidnapped Gabriel) take to the skies instead. Although Miruru is happy to have gotten away, Gabriel is understandably upset, and breaks free to jump off the rocket to rejoin his family. Miruru confessed to the officer that she is the illegal one, and submits herself to punishment. However, the officer, feeling pity for her, looks the other way, and allows her to join the family once more.
22	"Just Stretch Your Hand and... See?"; Transliteration: "Te o nobaseba, hora" (Japanese: 手をのばせば、ホラ)	Akira Shigino	Mamiko Ikeda	September 1, 1999
One night as she and Yuusuke are preparing for bed, Noelle's halo suddenly begins to glow and exude heat. They assume it is temporary, but in the following days, her halo begins to spin loudly, growing brighter and brighter, and becoming sharp and dangerous as time wears on. Muse thinks that this is a good opportunity to take her halo (and hopefully prevent her from becoming an angel) but the halo reacts violently, cutting her classmates' desks in half and ricocheting around the room like a blade until landing back above Noelle's head. Yuusuke tries to be sympathetic and cheer her up, but Noelle becomes distraught with the turn of events, and runs away. Mikael attempts to reassure her, as these new developments are signs that she's very close to becoming a full-fledged angel, but Noelle is still extremely troubled, wondering what will happen between herself and Yuusuke. When Noelle asks, Muse attempts to "help" her get rid of the halo by tying Noelle up, chaining it to her cart, and riding off, hoping to take the halo with her. Instead, the halo creates a powerful cyclone that destroys the school, sucking Yuusuke and all of the students into the vortex. Yuusuke promises Noelle she isn't alone, and the storm finally ceases when she admits that she no longer desires to become an angel. With that admission, her halo becomes dull and falls from her head, rolling to a stop at the feet of an angry Mikael. In the other dimension, the top drawer of Silky's "secret dresser" has been glowing and shaking, and Eros wonders whether or not to open it. Finally, we see the Book of Chaos, pages now entirely blank.
23	"A Breaking Heart"; Transliteration: "Kowarete yuku kokoro" (Japanese: こわれてゆく心)	Kiyotaka Ōhata	Mamiko Ikeda	September 8, 1999
Without her halo, Noelle begins to inexplicably sink into the ground. As a countermeasure, Lucca attaches a large balloon to Noelle's back to keep her afloat. Raphael is as cavalier as ever about Noelle's decision, but Mikael vows not to give up on reigniting Noelle's desire to be an angel by reminding her of how far she's come already, although she is pointedly unreceptive, as she fears becoming an angel will prevent her from becoming close to Yuusuke once more. Upon her refusal, Mikael becomes enraged and severs the attachment to her balloon with a pair of scissors, causing Noelle to fall into the ground, the scissors nearly stabbing her. Yuusuke sees this and questions Mikael, who then demands that Yuusuke leave Noelle alone for good, as he is impeding her progress in becoming an angel. When Yuusuke tells Mikael to back off, he goes to Noelle's family instead, intending to convince them that her giving up on becoming an angel is detrimental to her life, and that they, as a fake family, should let her go and stop hindering her. This leads to the family disbanding, driving Noelle to seek council with Mikael, desperately hoping for a way to restore things with her family. As she attempts to put the halo back on, Noelle remembers the havoc it caused, and throws it out the window. As Noelle runs home, Raphael reveals Mikael's own halo, and asks him if he knows why it fell off, to which Mikael responds that he's the only one who can bring everything together (even at the cost of becoming a demon) and summons an electric guitar. Noelle cries herself to sleep, and when she wakes the next morning, the house has reverted to normal, and only her and Yuusuke remain. Finally, after finding Silky crying in her room atop a mountain of stuffed bears, Eros opens the mysterious top drawer, revealing an angel's halo.
24	"That Which Is Waiting on the Other Side of the Door"; Transliteration: "Tobira no mukou ni matteiru mono" (Japanese: 扉の向こうに待っているもの)	Setsuo Takase	Mamiko Ikeda	September 15, 1999
Yuusuke goes out to find the family and bring them back together, telling Noelle (who has stopped sinking) to make curry at home and wait for him to return. With her mission of keeping Noelle from becoming an angel fulfilled, Muse returns to the other dimension, comforting Eros who continues to worry for Silky. After being thrown from the window, Noelle's halo has gone missing, leaving Mikael to desperately search for it. Meanwhile, Miruru has holed herself up at Natsumi's house in the wake of the family separating, and reveals the truth about what happened when Natsumi turned into a child. Miruru's bag starts shaking erratically, and Natsumi opens it to find Noelle's halo, which Miruru had stolen and planned to sell. The halo goes on another rampage, flicking around the room like a frisbee, before coming to a dead-stop in front of Natsumi. Yuusuke travels far and wide, trying to convince the family to come back together, but none are willing. Finally, Granny explains to him Noelle's origin story. The ball-like object shown before was an underdeveloped angel's soul, which split into three parts after falling. One of the pieces became Noelle, and Granny had to move the family to the human world when one of the other underdeveloped pieces tried to contact Noelle in the demon world. When the three souls reunite, it is believed that they will combine to form a single angel. Mikael goes after Noelle while she's alone, and uses his powers to render her unconscious. In the other dimension, Silky is having a breakdown, and goes into a panicked fury when Eros asks her if she's actually meant to be an angel, and was jealous of Noelle for having everything that she did not. When Silky tries to distract Eros with a promise of becoming her Prince, Eros destroys the throne himself, saying he'd rather she just be happy. The two almost come to an understanding, but at the last moment, Silky turns Eros back into a doll, leading to a fight between her and Muse. In the end, Silky turns Muse into a doll as well. Mikael carries the still-unconscious Noelle up to the school's clock tower, and Raphael questions his motives. Yuusuke returns home to find Noelle missing, and goes on a search for her. On the way out, he runs into Natsumi, who brought Noelle's halo back. The halo begins moving quickly in the direction of the school, at Yuusuke and Natsumi take chase. As Silky vows to prevent Noelle from becoming an angel, Mikael (who now appears to be evil) carries Noelle up a staircase spiraling into the sky.
25	"Because I Want Everything, I Need Nothing"; Transliteration: "Zenbu hoshii kara, nan ni mo iranai" (Japanese: ぜんぶ欲しいから、ナンにもいらない)	Jirō Fujimoto	Mamiko Ikeda	September 22, 1999
Having turned her companions into dolls, Silky goes to the human world herself to prevent Noelle from becoming an angel. Noelle awakens in Mikael's arms as he continues scaling the stairs to heaven, and attempts to run away from him when he explains his plan to use the Durian Comet to help grant their wish to become angels. Yuusuke begins following the two up the staircase, leaving Natsumi at the base of the clocktower for safety, although she is soon attacked by Silky, who also intends to stop Mikael. Noelle continues to try and run from Mikael, and after a brief struggle wherein he catches her, she takes the Book of Chaos and throws it, forcing Mikael to go after it. The Book falls onto Yuusuke's head, and he too throws it further down the stairs, giving him time to go to Noelle. Silky gets to the Book before Mikael, and although he sympathizes with her secluded and difficult life, she still refuses to become an angel, and tears out all of the book's pages. Down below, Noelle's family have arrived to wish upon the Durian Comet to bring things back to normal, although they don't realize it might be too late for that. Although initially distraught over the Book's ruin, Mikael quickly begins to laugh, saying that they will combine to become an angel, no matter what. As the Durian Comet glows overhead, Mikael grows wings, as do Noelle and Silky, who appear to be in a tremendous deal of pain. The episode cuts out as Silky reaches for one of the many candles adorning the stairway.
26	"What is Truly Important Right Now"; Transliteration: "Ima, ichiban taisetsu na mono" (Japanese: 今、いちばん大切なもの)	Kiyotaka Ōhata; Hiroshi Nishikiori	Mamiko Ikeda	September 29, 1999
Using the candle shown at the end of the previous episode, Silky sets fire to her wings, causing Noelle and Mikael's wings to burn too, due to their soul connection. Yuusuke attempts to put out the fire on Noelle, but his efforts are all in vain. Noelle's family and Natsumi begin scaling the staircase in the direction of the flames, but Natsumi catches a glimpse of Raphael out of the corner of her eye, and freezes, identifying him as her late older brother, Fuyuki. The staircase begins to fall apart, leaving those on it to plummet. As Noelle falls, she realizes her desire to save everyone, and puts all of her heart into wishing that she could be an angel, as instructed by Mikael earlier. With that heartfelt wish, Noelle becomes an angel and saves Yuusuke. Mikael and Silky become angels as well, and although Mikael takes the change understandably well, Silky still struggles, crying in Noelle's arms after repeating that she doesn't want to become an angel. As everyone lands, safe and sound, all appears right in the world. That is, until Noelle tries to hug Yuusuke, instead phasing through him, just as she phased through Raphael in an earlier episode. Before they can process this, Noelle, Silky and Mikael begin to float upward beyond their control. Granny explains that Noelle and the others can no longer return now that they've become angels, as their split soul is destined to become one again. Noelle begins to cry, realizing that becoming an angel means losing Yuusuke forever, and he too begins to lose hope, until Natsumi--remembering her brother--encourages him to try harder to reach her, before it becomes too late and he loses her forever. Noelle's family stand on one another's shoulders to bring Yuusuke closer to Noelle, and with the promise of being together forever, Noelle and Yuusuke are able to make contact, and are reunited as it begins to snow. The episode then cuts to the Christmas party at Noelle's mentioned a few episodes prior, with many of the monsters from the first half of the show making reappearances. Raphael reveals that Mikael's test was not actually for him to help Noelle, but to become a teacher at the Angel's School, the two return to heaven together, to start a new life. Noelle and Yuusuke kiss. After the credits, it is revealed that Silky transfers into Noelle and Yuusuke's class.

== Music ==
Opening Theme:

- "Because I Love You!" (だって、大好き!, Datte, Daisuki!)
  Lyrics by: Miyu Yuzuki
  Performed by: COMA
  (Composition and arrangement by: Yoshikazu Suo, Song by: Mimi Koishi)

Ending Theme:

- "Love is an Ocean" (あいは海, Ai wa Umi)
  Lyrics, composition and song by: Sizzle Ohtaka
  Arrangement by: Yoshikazu Suo

== North American distribution ==
Indication that I'm Gonna Be An Angel! was licensed in North America was revealed on Pierrot's website early 2001, but there was no mention on who the licensor was. In March 2001, Synch-Point officially announced they had acquired I'm Gonna Be An Angel! with FLCL for North American distribution. Volume one was released on VHS on July 10, 2001, as Synch-Point's debut title and later released on DVD on April 23, 2002. Volume two was delayed for a month and then again to an indefinite date. Two years after the first release of the first volume, Synch-Point announced they would release volume two on January 27, 2004, but it was delayed again until March 30, 2004, because of cover design issues.

At Fanime 2005, Synch-Point told the public that I'm Gonna Be An Angel had not been making a profit for them so they had to "raise funds with other projects first". They planned to release volume four to six as a set, but no releases have been made after volume three was released on January 4, 2005, almost a year after volume two was released. In 2008, Synch-Point's parent company, Broccoli International USA, ceased operations.

In 2017, the Tubi streaming service began offering the first thirteen episodes of I'm Gonna Be An Angel! in Japanese with English subtitles.
