= Ganbatte Ikimasshoi =

Novel by Yoshiko Shikimura

- Novel volume cover (paperback edition)

がんばっていきまっしょい
- Genre: Sports (rowing)
- Novel
- Written by: Yoshiko Shikimura
- Published by: Magazine House (first edition); Gentosha (paperback edition)
- Imprint: Gentosha Bunko (paperback edition)
- Published: July 1996 (first edition); June 10, 2005 (paperback edition)
- Live-action film
- Give It All
- Television drama
- Ganbatte Ikimasshoi
- Anime film
- Directed by: Yūhei Sakuragi
- Written by: Yūhei Sakuragi; Keiichirō Ōchi
- Music by: Sayuri Hayashi Egnell
- Studio: Studio Moe; Reirs
- Released: October 25, 2024
- Runtime: 95 minutes

Ganbatte Ikimasshoi (がんばっていきまっしょい; lit. 'Give It All') is a Japanese novel written by Yoshiko Shikimura. It was initially published by Magazine House in July 1996. Gentosha later republished the novel in paperback edition under their Gentosha Bunko imprint in June 2005. It was also adapted into a live-action film in 1998 and a television drama in 2005. An anime film adaptation produced by Studio Moe and Reirs premiered in Japan in October 2024.

== Characters ==
=== Anime film ===
Etsuko Murakami (村上悦子, Murakami Etsuko)
Voiced by: Sora Amamiya
Hime Saeki (佐伯姫, Saeki Hime)
Voiced by: Miku Itō
Riina Takahashi (高橋梨衣奈, Takahashi Riina)
Voiced by: Rie Takahashi
Taeko Hyōdō (兵頭妙子, Hyōdō Taeko)
Voiced by: Akari Kitō
Mayumi Imoto (井本真優美, Imoto Mayumi)
Voiced by: Ikumi Hasegawa
Hayato Ninomiya (二宮隼人, Ninomiya Hayato)
Voiced by: Takuya Eguchi
Umeko Terao (寺尾梅子, Terao Umeko)
Voiced by: Ayana Taketatsu
Mai Ōno (大野舞, Ōno Mai)
Voiced by: Suzuko Mimori
Kaori Yasuda (安田夏央莉, Yasuda Kaori)
Voiced by: Aya Uchida

== Media ==
=== Anime film ===
An anime film adaptation was announced on March 21, 2024. The film is produced by Studio Moe and Reirs and directed by Yūhei Sakuragi, with scripts written by Sakuragi and Keiichirō Ōchi, character designs by Asako Nishida, and music composed by Sayuri Hayashi Egnell. It was released in Japan on October 25, 2024. The film's theme song is performed by Boku ga Mitakatta Aozora.

== Reception ==
The novel won the first prize at the "Bocchan Literary Prize" award in 1995.
