= Close Your Eyes and Hold Me =

- DVD cover
- Directed by: Itsumichi Isomura
- Screenplay by: Yuka Honcho
- Based on: Me o Tojite Daite by Shungiku Uchida
- Produced by: Keisuke Konishi; Toru Uemira (executive producer)
- Starring: Kumiko Takeda; Kazuya Takahashi; Natsue Yoshimura
- Cinematography: Yuichi Nagata
- Edited by: Jun'ichi Kukichi
- Music by: Hiroki Sakuguchi
- Production company: Altamira Pictures
- Distributed by: Tohokushinsha Film; Asian Pulp Cinema (US)
- Release date: July 13, 1996 (Japan)
- Running time: 90 minutes
- Country: Japan
- Language: Japanese

Close Your Eyes and Hold Me (Japanese: 目を閉じて抱いて, Hepburn: Me o Tojite Daite) is a 1996 Japanese film based on the manga Me wo Tojite Daite by Shungicu Uchida. The film is directed by Itsumichi Isomura and stars Kumiko Takeda, Kazuya Takahashi and Natsue Yoshimura. The film focuses on a love triangle between a lowly office worker, his girlfriend, and a transgender sex worker he falls in love with.

It was released in theaters on July 13, 1996, in Japan. The movie was released in North American on subtitled only VHS on November 23, 1998, and then on DVD on January 13, 2004, by Central Park Media under their Asia Pulp Cinema label.

== Plot ==
Amane (Kazuya Takahashi) is a regular office worker who is bored with life. His girlfriend Juri (Natsue Yoshimura) pressures him to put their relationship to the next level. However, he is uncomfortable in the relationship. One day, as he is driving, he hits a woman who was walking on the road. She is taken to the hospital where she eventually recovers. Guilty of what he's done, Amane tells her to let him repay her for the accident, but she declines and disappears from the hospital. Obsessed since their encounter, he finally finds her one night at a nightclub and learns that her name is Hanabusa. He also learns that the nightclub is intended for newhalves (transgender women) and that Hanabusa (Kumiko Takeda) is a pre-op trans woman. Amane is disgusted at first, but he goes along with her for the rest of the night.

After that night, Amane longs to see Hanabusa, and they have sex one night. Hanabusa shows Amane on how to be the perfect partner in sex both on top and bottom. Satisfied with this, Amane breaks up with Juri and both Hanabusa and Amane fall in love. Juri is upset and tries to confront Hanabusa, but ends up having sex with her that night. The next morning, Juri, while having enjoyed that she slept with Hanabusa, is even more angry at Amane and has sex with one of his co-workers, Takayanagi (Kunihiko Ida).

Meanwhile, Amane and Hanabusa drive to Amane's hometown, and Amane purposes that Hanabusa should meet his family. However, Hanabusa refuses and tells him to pull over. Amane is confused by this and states that he want to further their relationship. Hanabusa does not want to and suggests that they should break up. Amane confronts her and angrily states that there is no place for someone like her. She responds by telling him to run over her again.

They sit silently in the car, as Amane is trying to start the car. However, he is angry and tells Hanabusa that he is lonely and desperately in love with her. Hanabusa still suggests they should just end their relationship. Later, Takayanagi reveals to Amane that he slept with Juri half-way and suggests that he and Juri reconcile. Amane tells him that he is better off not seeing her or Hanabusa, but in reality, he is more depressed and alone.

The next morning, Hanabusa is walking and finds Amane sitting in the snow. He gives back the heel from one of her shoes and leaves. But Hanabusa stops him and realizes that they should be lovers and mend their relationship. Meanwhile, Juri finds out that her period is late and uses this as a way to get back together with Amane and tries to push him into marrying her. However, Amane and Hanabusa believe she is lying, which makes her upset and she leaves.

She later leaves a message on his voice-mail, threatening to commit suicide by drug overdose, blaming Amane for leaving her and pleading to him to come back to her one more time. The last scene in the film is Hanabusa and Amane visiting a now comatose Juri in the hospital. Amane says that this is the end, while Hanabusa remarks that it is not the end, but just the beginning.

== Cast ==
=== Japanese Cast ===
- Kumiko Takeda as Hanabusa
- Kazuya Takahashi as Amane
- Natsue Yoshimura as Juri
- Kunihiko Ida as Takayanagi
- Yoshiko Ichinose as Itsuko
- Shinobu Sato as Doctor
- Koji Sueyoshi as Nanaomi

=== English Vocal Cast ===
- Suzy Prue as Hanabusa
- J.K. Ellemeno as Amane
- Petra Kosic as Juri
- Fenton Lawless as Takayanagi
- Angora Deb as Itsuko, Additional Voices

== Reception ==
The film holds at 43% at Rotten Tomatoes.
