= I Just Didn't Do It =

2007 film by Masayuki Suo

- Theatrical release poster
- Directed by: Masayuki Suo
- Screenplay by: Masayuki Suo
- Produced by: Shintaro Horikawa; Yoshino Sasaki; Daisuke Sekiguchi
- Starring: Ryo Kase; Asaka Seto; Koji Yamamoto; Masako Motai; Kōji Yakusho
- Cinematography: Naoki Kayano
- Edited by: Junichi Kikuchi
- Music by: Yoshikazu Suo
- Production companies: Altamira Pictures; Fuji Television Network; Toho
- Distributed by: Toho
- Release dates: November 2006 (AFM); January 20, 2007 (Japan)
- Running time: 143 minutes
- Country: Japan
- Language: Japanese
- Box office: ¥1.11 billion

I Just Didn't Do It (Japanese: それでもボクはやってない, Hepburn: Soredemo boku wa yattenai) is a 2007 Japanese drama film directed by Masayuki Suo, starring Ryo Kase, Asaka Seto and Kōji Yakusho. It was selected as the Japanese entry for the Best Foreign Language Film at the 80th Academy Awards, but it was not nominated.

== Plot ==
Based on a true story, the film is the story of a young man charged with groping on a train. Following the events depicted in the film, which end in a conviction and his decision to appeal, in real life his appeal was rejected by supreme court and his sentence to 18 months of prison has been confirmed.

== Cast ==
- Ryo Kase
- Asaka Seto
- Masako Motai
- Koji Yamamoto
- Ranran Suzuki
- Fumiyo Kohinata
- Miyu Yagyu
- Toshinori Omi
- Bokuzō Masana
- Tetsushi Tanaka
- Nao Ōmori
- Hirotarō Honda
- Naoto Takenaka
- Hiromasa Taguchi
- Shinya Owada
- Kōji Yakusho

== Release ==
The film premiered at the American Film Market in November 2006 in the United States and distributed by Toho in Japan on January 20, 2007. It was later shown in New York City on January 11, 2007.

== Accolades ==
It was Japan's submission to the 80th Academy Awards for the Academy Award for Best Foreign Language Film, but was not accepted as a nominee. It was chosen as the Best Film at the 2008 Yokohama Film Festival.

== See also ==
- Cinema of Japan
- List of submissions to the 80th Academy Awards for Best Foreign Language Film
- List of Japanese submissions for the Academy Award for Best Foreign Language Film
