= Itsumichi Isomura =

Japanese film director (born 1950)

- Born: November 30, 1950 (age 75); Gifu, Japan
- Occupation: Film director

Itsumichi Isomura (磯村一路, Isomura Itsumichi) is a Japanese film director. He won the award for Best Director at the 20th Yokohama Film Festival for Give It All. Isomura co-founded the Japanese film studio Altamira Pictures with fellow director Masayuki Suo, as well as producers Shoji Masui and Yuji Ogata.

== Filmography ==
- Rēpu zōn okashi no rirekisho (1979) - Co-directed with Yoshiho Fukuoka and Toshiharu Suzuki.
- Waisetsu dokyumento renzoku henshitsu ma (1980)
- Hentai hanayome sagashi (1980)
- Hentai hanayome okashi (1980)
- OL hentai shikijō (1980)
- A Crazy Love Affair, Pacifier (1981)
- Ryōki henshitsu ma (1981)
- Shikijō ma sei gōmon (1982)
- Shinnin jokyōshi: Double onanii (1983)
- Hentai okasu (1983)
- Days of Lust: Ecstasy (1984)
- Kinbaku sailor fuku (1984)
- Bondage: Whip and Rope (1984)
- Bondage: Whip and High Heels (1985)
- Tōsaku midare nawa (1985)
- Kinbaku no shioki (1985)
- Perverse Play (1986)
- Ojōsan no onanii (1986)
- Hentai (1987)
- Danchi tsuma: Nyuu taun bōkō-ma (1987)
- Fujisawa Marino Marino-Sansan (1988)
- Gattubī - Bokura wa kono natsu nekutai wo suru, also known as Gappie, Wear a Tie this Summer (1990)
- 1990 botan-dōrō (1990)
- Dance till Tomorrow (1991)
- The Great Clash (1993)
- Kiriko, A Woman Who Loved the Gangsters (1993)
- Human Scramble: Road (1993)
- Suicide Attack Ladies, Yoroshiku (1994)
- J League wo 100-bai Tanoshiku Miru Houhou!!, also known as How to Enjoy Watching J. League 100 Times More (1994) - Anime film, co-directed with Tatsuo Sato.
- Close Your Eyes and Hold Me (1996)
- Give It All (1998)
- The Blue Blanket (2002)
- Her Island, My Island (2003)
- Gege, also known as Milk White (2004)
- River of First Love (2004)
- Tokage tonda? (2006)
- Kayōkyoku dayo jinsei wa, also known as Tokyo Rhapsody (2007) - Anthology film, co-directed with Shinobu Yaguchi, Yoshikazu Ebisu, Mitsuhiro Mihara and Toshiyuki Mizutani.
- Matataki (2010)
- Okāsan no Ki (2015)
