= Tamiyo Kusakari =

Japanese ballet dancer and actress

- Born: May 10, 1965 (age 61); Tokyo, Japan
- Occupations: Ballet dancer, actress
- Spouse: Masayuki Suo

Tamiyo Kusakari (草刈 民代, Kusakari Tamiyo; born 10 May 1965) is a Japanese actress and former ballet dancer. In 1997 her portrayal of Mai Kishikawa in Shall We Dance? won a Japan Academy Prize for Outstanding Performance by an Actress in a Leading Role.

== Biography ==
From Toshima, Tokyo, Kusakari started dancing professionally at the age of eight and won the first prize at the Japan Ballet Competition of 1987. In 1987, she made her debut as Odette in Swan Lake. She received the Muramatsu Award in 1988, and the Tachibana Akiko Award in 1990. At 27, she suffered a hernia that nearly ended her career, leaving her a temporary wheelchair user. She retired from ballet in 2009 at the age of 43.

Kusakari is also known for her starring role in Shall We Dance? During the production of the movie she met and later married the director, Masayuki Suo.

She starred in Suo's 2012 film A Terminal Trust.

== Recognition ==
- 1996, 20th Japan Academy Prize, Outstanding Performance by an Actress in a Leading Role

== Filmography ==
=== Films ===
- Shall We Dance? (1996), Mai Kishikawa
- Dancing Chaplin (2010)
- A Terminal Trust (2012)
- Lady Maiko (2014)
- Moon and Lightning (2017)
- Talking the Pictures (2019), Marguerite (Alla Nazimova)
- Yasuko, Songs of Days Past (2025), star actress

=== Television ===
- Shinzanmono (2010)
- Ryōmaden (2010)
- Diplomat Kosaku Kuroda (2011)
- Shizumanu Taiyō (2016)
- Tokyo Sentimental (2016)
- Kuroido Goroshi (2018), Mitsuru Kuroido
- Great Love: With You Who Forget Me (大恋愛～僕を忘れる君と, Dai Renai: Boku o Wasureru Kimi to) (2018)
