= Shall We Dance? (1996 film) =

1996 Japanese film by Masayuki Suo

- Theatrical release poster
- Kanji: Shall we ダンス?
- Revised Hepburn: Sharu wi Dansu?
- Directed by: Masayuki Suo
- Screenplay by: Masayuki Suo
- Based on: Shall We Dance (1937 film) by Mark Sandrich
- Produced by: Yasuyoshi Tokuma; Yasushi Urushido; Shigeru Ono; Kazuhiro Igarashi
- Starring: Kōji Yakusho; Tamiyo Kusakari; Naoto Takenaka; Eriko Watanabe; Akira Emoto
- Cinematography: Naoki Kayano
- Edited by: Junichi Kikuchi
- Music by: Yoshikazu Suo
- Production companies: Altamira Pictures; Nippon-TV; Hakuhodo; Nippon Shuppan Hanbai; Daiei
- Distributed by: Toho
- Release date: 27 January 1996 (Japan)
- Running time: 136 minutes
- Country: Japan
- Languages: Japanese; English
- Box office: ¥2.72 billion (Japan) $43 million (worldwide)

Shall We Dance? (Japanese: Shall we ダンス?, Hepburn: Sharu wī dansu) is a 1996 Japanese romantic comedy drama film directed by Masayuki Suo. Its title refers to the song "Shall We Dance?" which comes from Rodgers and Hammerstein's The King and I. It inspired the 2004 English-language remake of the same name.

== Plot ==
The film begins with a close-up of the inscription above the stage in the ballroom of the Blackpool Tower: "Bid me discourse, I will enchant thine ear", from the poem Venus and Adonis by William Shakespeare. As the camera pans around the ballroom giving a view of the dancers, a voice-over explains the history of ballroom dance in Europe, and how it came to Japan.

Successful salaryman Shohei Sugiyama has a house in the suburbs, a devoted wife, Masako, and a teenage daughter, Chikage. He works as an accountant for a firm in Tokyo. Despite these external signs of success, however, Sugiyama begins to feel as if his life has lost direction and meaning and falls into depression.

One night, while coming home on the Seibu Ikebukuro Line, he spots a slender woman with a melancholic expression looking out from the window of a dance studio. He does not know it, but she is Mai Kishikawa, a well-known figure on the Western ballroom dance circuit. Infatuated, he decides on a whim to take dance lessons.

Sugiyama's life changes once his classes begin. Rather than Mai, his teacher is an older woman, Tamako Tamura, who becomes an important mentor to him. He meets his classmates: Tōkichi Hattori who joined to impress his wife, and Masahiro Tanaka who joined to lose weight. He also meets Toyoko Takahashi, another student. He further discovers that one of his colleagues from work, Tomio Aoki, frequents the dance studio. Tomio, who is balding and mocked at work for his rigid ways, is revealed to be secretly a long-haired (via a wig) ballroom dancer. Though distant from her, the classes increase his infatuation with Mai. His secret thus becomes twofold: not only must he hide the lessons from his wife, he must also hide them from his friends and colleagues as it is considered embarrassing according to traditional Japanese customs to participate in Western ballroom dance.

Later, after being rebuffed by Mai, Sugiyama discovers to his surprise that his passion for ballroom dance has survived her rejection. Indeed, dance, rather than Mai, has given Sugiyama the meaning in life that he was looking for.

Masako, noticing his odd behavior, believes he is having an affair, prompting her to hire a private detective to follow him. Meanwhile, along with his classmates, Sugiyama enters an amateur competition, only to find out that his wife, having finally learned the truth from the detective (who has now become a devoted fan of ballroom dancing), is in the audience. Surprised by this, he stumbles and nearly knocks his dance partner to the floor. Though he successfully catches her, he accidentally rips the skirt of her dress off. Both leave the contest. Sugiyama later learns that Aoki was disqualified. When Aoki is ridiculed at work after his colleagues read of his failure in the newspaper, Sugiyama stands up and tells them not to mock something they do not understand.

At home, Sugiyama tells his family that he has given up dance. A little while later, he is visited by Toyoko and Aoki, who try to get him to return and tell him to come to a farewell party for Mai, who is leaving for Blackpool. They hand him a letter from Mai in which she explains her own past failure at Blackpool, attributing it to her dancing alone and not truly trusting her partner and how working with Sugiyama and Toyoko reinspired her to try again. Sugiyama at last has a real conversation with Masako about what happened, but angrily tells her he is through with dance, even when she asks him to teach her. But he gives in and they reconcile when his daughter Chikage pushes them together and he teaches her some steps. On the way home the next day, he looks out of the train window and sees a sign in the dance studio window “Shall we dance, Mr. Sugiyama”. He changes his mind and heads to the party, arriving in time for the last dance, where Mai will choose her partner. Mai approaches him and asks him “Shall we dance?".

== Cast ==
- Kōji Yakusho as Shohei Sugiyama
- Tamiyo Kusakari as Mai Kishikawa
- Naoto Takenaka as Tomio Aoki
- Eriko Watanabe as Toyoko Takahashi
- Yu Tokui as Tokichi Hattori
- Hiromasa Taguchi as Masahiro Tanaka
- Reiko Kusamura as Tamako Tamura
- Hideko Hara as Masako Sugiyama
- Hiroshi Miyasaka as Macho
- Kunihiko Ida as Teiji Kaneko
- Amie Toujou as Hisako Honda
- Ayano Nakamura as Chikage Sugiyama
- Katsunari Mineno as Keiri-kacho
- Tomiko Ishii as Haruko Haraguchi
- Masahiro Motoki as Hiromasa Kimoto

== Release ==
Shall We Dance? was released on January 27, 1996, in Japan, where it was distributed by Toho. It was released in the United States by Miramax. The Miramax version was cut to 118 minutes and released on July 4, 1997.

== Reception ==
=== Box office ===
In Japan, the film was a surprise hit and became a social phenomenon, attracting audiences who had not attended the cinema for many years, demonstrating that Japanese films could appeal to a wider audience than just under-12s and over-50s. It earned a distribution income (rentals) of ¥1.6 billion in 1996, making it the second top-grossing Japanese film of the year, after Godzilla vs. Destoroyah. Shall We Dance? grossed a total Japanese box office revenue of ¥2.72 billion ($25 million).

The film performed strongly in American theaters, grossing $9.7 million during its US release. Outside of the United States, the film grossed $33,287,618 internationally in other territories (including Japan), for a worldwide total of $43 million.

=== Critical response ===
Review aggregator website Rotten Tomatoes reported that 90% of critics have given the film a positive review based on 52 reviews. The site's critical consensus reads, "Elegantly told by director Masayuki Suo and warmly performed, Shall We Dance? is a delightful celebration of stepping out of one's comfort zone and cutting a rug." Roger Ebert awarded the film 3.5 out of 4 stars, stating in the Chicago Sun Times that Shall We Dance? is "one of the more completely entertaining movies I've seen in a while—a well-crafted character study that, like a Hollywood movie with a skillful script, manipulates us but makes us like it." Critic Paul Tatara noted that "It isn't really fair to suggest that the movie's main subject is dance, though. As much as anything else, it's about the healing powers (and poetry) of simple self-expression."

=== Awards ===
Despite claiming unprecedented success in box office and critical acclaim, the movie did not represent Japan in the Academy Awards - it went to Gakko II, which ended up failing to secure nomination.

At the Japanese Academy Awards it won 14 awards: Best Film, Best Actor, Best Actress, Best Art Direction, Best Cinematography, Best Director, Best Editing, Best Lighting, Best Music Score, Best Screenplay, Best Sound, Best Supporting Actor, Best Supporting Actress, and Newcomer of the Year.

The National Board of Review gave it the award for Best Foreign Language Film.

== Foreign remakes ==
Shall We Dance? was remade in English by Miramax in 2004 as Shall We Dance?, starring Richard Gere and Jennifer Lopez in the Yakusho and Kusakari roles respectively. The 2004 remake itself inspired another foreign remake. In 2006, an Egyptian film titled Let's Dance (Egyptian Arabic: ما تيجي نرقص, romanized: Mah teegy nor'os) was released, starring Yousra in Richard Gere's role.

== See also ==
- Strictly Ballroom (1992)
