= List of accolades received by Departures (2008 film) =

List of awards won by Departures
Awards & nominations
Award	Won	Nominated
Academy Awards	1	1
Asia Pacific Screen Awards	1	2
Asian Film Awards	1	1
Blue Ribbon Awards	1	1
Camerimage	0	1
Eigakan Taishō	0	1
Élan d'Or Award	2	2
Golden Rooster Awards	3	3
Hawaii International Film Festival	1	1
Hochi Film Award	1	1
Hong Kong Film Award	1	1
Japan Academy Prize	10	13
Kinema Junpo Award	4	4
Mainichi Film Award	1	1
Montreal World Film Festival	1	1
Nikkan Sports Film Awards	2	2
Palm Springs International Film Festival	1	1
Tokyo Sports Film Award	2	2
Trailer ZEN Film Festival	1	1
Udine Far-East Film Festival	1	1
Wisconsin Film Festival	1	1
Yokohama Film Festival	4	4
Yomiuri Prize	1	1
- Total number of wins and nominations
Totals	41	47
- Footnotes

Departures (おくりびと, Okuribito) is a Japanese drama film written by Kundō Koyama and directed by Yōjirō Takita that was released in 2008. Based on the book Coffinman by Aoki Shinmon, it follows a young man, Daigo Kobayashi (Masahiro Motoki), who loses his job as a cellist and moves back to his hometown. Despite objections from his wife Mika (Ryōko Hirosue), he finds fulfilment in performing traditional encoffinment ceremonies with his boss, Sasaki (Tsutomu Yamazaki), and his coworker, Kamimura (Kimiko Yo).

The film was premiered by Shochiku in Japan on 13 September, with a North American release on 29 May 2009 and a British one on 4 December. Owing to traditional Japanese taboos about death, Takita did not expect the film to be a success. However, Departures was the highest-grossing domestic film of 2008 in Japan, earning ¥3.05 billion in box office revenue, and a total of $69,932,387 worldwide. The film was also well received by critics, with an approval rating of 81% on the review aggregator Rotten Tomatoes; reviewer Roger Ebert described it as "excellent at achieving the universal ends of narrative".

International awards for Departures began to accrue before its domestic release, when the film was granted the Grand Prix des Ameriques at the Montreal World Film Festival. Over the next several months it received multiple awards, including four from Kinema Junpo, and in September 2008 it was selected as Japan's submission for the Academy Award for Best Foreign Language Film. In February 2009, Departures dominated the Japan Academy Prizes, receiving thirteen nominations and winning ten. During the 81st Academy Awards held later that week, Departures became the first Japanese submission to win the Oscar for Best Foreign Language Film, over the critical favourite Waltz with Bashir (Ari Folman). (Note: Before the category was formed in 1956, three Japanese films received honorary awards: Rashomon (Akira Kurosawa; 1951), Gate of Hell (Teinosuke Kinugasa; 1954), and Samurai, The Legend of Musashi (Hiroshi Inagaki; 1955). The Japanese-Soviet co-production Dersu Uzala (Akira Kurosawa; 1975) won the award, but it was submitted for the Soviet Union.) Into 2010 Departures picked up several further awards, including Best Asian Film at the Hong Kong Film Awards.

This international success led to the development of a tourism industry based around the film, with some sites receiving thousands of visitors, and stimulated both a theatrical re-release and a reprint of Coffinman. A hearse based on Kobayashi and Sasaki's vehicle in the film was likewise put into production.

== Accolades ==
List of accolades received by Departures
Date of ceremony	Award	Category	Recipients and nominees	Result
August 2008	Montreal World Film Festival	Grand Prix des Ameriques		Won
12 September 2008	Rooster International Film Festival	Audience Award for Best Foreign Film		Won
12 September 2008	Rooster International Film Festival	Audience Award for Best Foreign Director	Yōjirō Takita	Won
12 September 2008	Rooster International Film Festival	Audience Award for Best Foreign Actor	Masahiro Motoki	Won
21 October 2008	Hawaii International Film Festival	Audience Choice Award		Won
27 November 2008	Hochi Film Award	Best Film		Won
29 November 2008	Trailer ZEN Film Festival	Grand Prix		Won
3 December 2008	Nikkan Sports Film Awards	Best Film		Won
3 December 2008	Nikkan Sports Film Awards	Best Director	Yōjirō Takita	Won
11 January 2009	Kinema Junpo Awards	Best Film		Won
11 January 2009	Kinema Junpo Awards	Best Director	Yōjirō Takita	Won
11 January 2009	Kinema Junpo Awards	Best Screenplay	Kundō Koyama	Won
11 January 2009	Kinema Junpo Awards	Best Actor	Masahiro Motoki	Won
14 January 2009	Blue Ribbon Awards	Best Actor	Masahiro Motoki	Won
19 January 2009	Palm Springs International Film Festival	Mercedes-Benz Audience Award for Best Narrative Feature		Won
21 January 2009	Mainichi Film Awards	Best Film		Won
21 January 2009	Mainichi Film Awards	Best Sound	Satoshi Ozaki	Won
31 January 2009	Tokyo Sports Film Award	Best Leading Actor	Masahiro Motoki	Won
31 January 2009	Tokyo Sports Film Award	Best Supporting Actor	Tsutomu Yamazaki (Note: Also for Climber's High)	Won
1 February 2009	Yomiuri Prize	Best Drama/Screenplay	Kundō Koyama	Won
1 February 2009	Yokohama Film Festival	Best Film		Won
1 February 2009	Yokohama Film Festival	Best Director	Yōjirō Takita	Won
1 February 2009	Yokohama Film Festival	Best Supporting Actress	Kimiko Yo (Note: Also for Where the Legend Lives and Oka wo Koete)	Won
1 February 2009	Yokohama Film Festival	Best Supporting Actress	Ryōko Hirosue	Won
5 February 2009	Élan d'Or Award	TV Taro Award for Best Film		Won
5 February 2009	Élan d'Or Award	Best Producer	Toshiaki Nakazawa	Won
20 February 2009	Japan Academy Prizes	Picture of the Year		Won
20 February 2009	Japan Academy Prizes	Director of the Year	Yōjirō Takita	Won
20 February 2009	Japan Academy Prizes	Screenplay of the Year	Kundō Koyama	Won
20 February 2009	Japan Academy Prizes	Outstanding Performance by an Actor in a Leading Role	Masahiro Motoki	Won
20 February 2009	Japan Academy Prizes	Outstanding Performance by an Actress in a Leading Role	Ryōko Hirosue	Nominated
20 February 2009	Japan Academy Prizes	Outstanding Performance by an Actor in a Supporting Role	Tsutomu Yamazaki	Won
20 February 2009	Japan Academy Prizes	Outstanding Performance by an Actress in a Supporting Role	Kimiko Yo	Won
20 February 2009	Japan Academy Prizes	Outstanding Achievement in Music	Joe Hisaishi	Nominated
20 February 2009	Japan Academy Prizes	Outstanding Achievement in Cinematography	Takeshi Hamada	Won
20 February 2009	Japan Academy Prizes	Outstanding Achievement in Lighting Direction	Hitoshi Takaya	Won
20 February 2009	Japan Academy Prizes	Outstanding Achievement in Art Direction	Fumio Ogawa	Nominated
20 February 2009	Japan Academy Prizes	Outstanding Achievement in Sound Recording	Satoshi Ozaki and Osamu Onodera	Won
20 February 2009	Japan Academy Prizes	Outstanding Achievement in Film Editing	Akimasa Kawashima	Won
22 February 2009	Academy Awards	Best Foreign Language Film		Won
23 March 2009	Asian Film Awards	Best Actor	Masahiro Motoki	Won
5 April 2009	Wisconsin Film Festival	Best Feature Film		Won
22 April 2009	Eigakan Taishō	Film of the Year		3rd place
2 May 2009	Udine Far-East Film Festival	Audience Award		Won
2 May 2009	Udine Far-East Film Festival	Black Dragon Audience Award		Won
26 November 2009	Asia Pacific Screen Awards	Best Screenplay	Kundō Koyama	Nominated
26 November 2009	Asia Pacific Screen Awards	Best Performance by an Actor	Masahiro Motoki	Won
5 December 2009	Camerimage	Golden Frog	Takeshi Hamada	Nominated
18 April 2010	Hong Kong Film Awards	Best Asian Film		Won
