= Departures (2008 film) =

2008 film by Yōjirō Takita

- Theatrical release poster
- Directed by: Yōjirō Takita
- Written by: Kundō Koyama
- Produced by: Yasuhiro Mase; Toshiaki Nakazawa
- Starring: Masahiro Motoki; Ryōko Hirosue; Tsutomu Yamazaki
- Cinematography: Takeshi Hamada
- Edited by: Akimasa Kawashima
- Music by: Joe Hisaishi
- Production companies: Tokyo Broadcasting System; Amuse Soft Entertainment; Asahi Shimbun; Dentsu; Mainichi Broadcasting System; Sedic; Shochiku; ShoPro; TBS Radio & Communications
- Distributed by: Shochiku
- Release dates: 23 August 2008 (MWFF); 13 September 2008 (Japan)
- Running time: 130 minutes
- Country: Japan
- Language: Japanese
- Box office: $70 million

Departures (Japanese: おくりびと, Hepburn: Okuribito; "one who sends off") is a 2008 Japanese drama film directed by Yōjirō Takita and starring Masahiro Motoki, Ryōko Hirosue, and Tsutomu Yamazaki. The film follows a young man who returns to his hometown after a failed career as a cellist and stumbles across work as a nōkanshi—a traditional Japanese ritual mortician. He is subjected to prejudice from those around him, including from his wife, because of strong social taboos against people who deal with death. Eventually he repairs these interpersonal connections through the beauty and dignity of his work.

The idea for Departures arose after Motoki, affected by having seen a funeral ceremony along the Ganges when travelling in India, read widely on the subject of death and came across Coffinman. He felt that the story would adapt well to film, and Departures was finished a decade later. Because of Japanese prejudices against those who handle the dead, distributors were reluctant to release it—until a surprise grand prize win at the Montreal World Film Festival in August 2008. The following month the film opened in Japan, where it went on to win the Academy Prize for Picture of the Year and become the year's highest-grossing domestic film. This success was topped in 2009, when it became the first Japanese production to win the Academy Award for Best Foreign Language Film. (Note: Before the category was formed in 1956, three Japanese films received honorary awards: Rashomon (Akira Kurosawa; 1951), Gate of Hell (Teinosuke Kinugasa; 1954), and Samurai, The Legend of Musashi (Hiroshi Inagaki; 1955) (MMPAJ). The Japanese-Soviet co-production Dersu Uzala (Akira Kurosawa; 1975) won the award, but it was submitted for the Soviet Union (Armstrong).)

Departures received positive reviews, with aggregator Rotten Tomatoes indicating an 80% approval rating from 108 reviews. Critics praised the film's humour, the beauty of the encoffining ceremony, and the quality of the acting, but some took issue with its predictability and overt sentimentality. Reviewers highlighted a variety of themes, but focused mainly on the humanity that death brings to the surface and how it strengthens family bonds. The success of Departures led to the establishment of tourist attractions at sites connected to the film and increased interest in encoffining ceremonies, as well as adaptation of the story for various media, including manga and a stage play.

== Plot ==
Daigo Kobayashi loses his job as a cellist when his orchestra is disbanded. He and his wife Mika move from Tokyo to his hometown in Yamagata, where they live in his childhood home that was left to him when his mother died two years earlier. It is fronted by a coffee shop that Daigo's father had operated before he ran off with a waitress when Daigo was six; since then the two have had no contact. Daigo feels hatred towards his father and guilt for not taking better care of his mother. He still keeps a "stone-letter"—a stone which is said to convey meaning through its texture—which his father had given him many years before.

Daigo finds an advertisement for a job "assisting departures". Assuming it to be a job in a travel agency, he goes to the interview at the NK Agent office and learns from the secretary, Yuriko Kamimura, that he will be preparing bodies for cremation in a ceremony known as encoffinment. Though reluctant, Daigo is hired on the spot and receives a cash advance from his new boss, Sasaki. Daigo is furtive about his duties and hides the true nature of the job from Mika.

His first assignment is to assist with the encoffinment of a woman who died at home and remained undiscovered for two weeks. He is beset with nausea and later humiliated when strangers on a bus detect an unsavoury scent on him. To clean himself, he visits a public bath which he had frequented as a child. It is owned by Tsuyako Yamashita, the mother of one of Daigo's former classmates.

Over time, Daigo becomes comfortable with his profession as he completes a number of assignments and experiences the gratitude of the families of the deceased. Though he faces social ostracism, Daigo refuses to quit, even after Mika discovers a training DVD in which he plays a corpse and leaves him to return to her parents' home in Tokyo. Daigo's former classmate Yamashita insists that the mortician find a more respectable line of work and, until then, avoids him and his family.

After a few months, Mika returns and announces that she is pregnant. She expresses hope that Daigo will find a job of which their child can be proud. During the ensuing argument, Daigo receives a call for an encoffinment for Mrs Yamashita. Daigo prepares her body in front of both the Yamashita family and Mika, who had known the public bath owner. The ritual earns him the respect of all present, and Mika stops insisting that Daigo change jobs. At the funeral, Yamashita is permitted to witness the burning of his mother's body through a peephole on the retort and listens to a heartfelt anecdote about death told by the furnace operator.

Sometime later, they learn of the death of Daigo's father. Daigo experiences renewed feelings of anger and tells the others at the NK office that he refuses to deal with his father's body. Feeling ashamed of having abandoned her own son long ago, Yuriko tells this to Daigo in an effort to change his mind. Daigo berates Yuriko and storms out before collecting himself and turning around. He goes with Mika to another village to see the body. Daigo is at first unable to recognize him, but takes offence when local funeral workers are careless with the body. He insists on dressing it himself, and while doing so finds a stone-letter that he had given to his father, held tight in the dead man's hands. The childhood memory of his father's face returns to him, and after he finishes the ceremony, Daigo gently presses the stone-letter to Mika's pregnant belly.

== Production ==
=== Cultural background ===
Japanese funerals are highly ritualized affairs which are generally—though not always—conducted in accordance with Buddhist rites. In preparation for the funeral, the body is washed and the orifices are blocked with cotton or gauze. The encoffining ritual (called nōkan), as depicted in Departures, is rarely performed, and even then only in rural areas. This ceremony is not standardized, but generally involves professional morticians (納棺師, nōkanshi) (Note: Also called morticians (湯灌師, yukanshi); yukan is the ceremonial cleansing of the body that comes before the nōkan proper.) ritually preparing the body, dressing the dead in white, and sometimes applying make-up. The body is then put on dry ice in a casket, along with personal possessions and items deemed necessary for the trip to the afterlife.

Despite the importance of death rituals, in traditional Japanese culture the subject is considered unclean as everything related to death is thought to be a source of kegare (defilement). After coming into contact with the dead, individuals must cleanse themselves through purifying rituals. People who work closely with the dead, such as morticians, are thus considered unclean, and during the feudal era those whose work was related to death became burakumin (untouchables), forced to live in their own hamlets and discriminated against by wider society. Despite a cultural shift since the Meiji Restoration of 1868, the stigma of death still has considerable force within Japanese society, and discrimination against the untouchables has continued. (Note: For a more detailed discussion of the position of kegare and death in Japanese society, see Okuyama 2013, pp. 8–12.)

Until 1972, most deaths were dealt with by families, funeral homes, or nōkanshi. As of 2014, about 80% of deaths occur in hospitals, and preparation of the bodies is frequently done by hospital staff; in such cases, the family often does not see the body until the funeral. A 1998 survey found that 29.5% of the Japanese population believed in an afterlife, and a further 40% wanted to believe; belief was highest among the young. Belief in the existence of a soul (54%) and a connection between the worlds of the living and the dead (64.9%) was likewise common.

=== Conception and preproduction ===
In the early 1990s, a 27-year-old Motoki and his friend travelled to India; just before going, at the friend's recommendation he read Shin'ya Fujiwara's Memento Mori (Latin for "remember that you will die"). While in India, he visited Varanasi, where he saw a ceremony in which the dead were cremated and their ashes floated down the Ganges. Witnessing this ceremony of death against a backdrop of bustling crowds going about their lives deeply affected Motoki. When he returned to Japan, he read numerous books on the subject of death, and in 1993 wrote a book on the relationship between life and death: Tenkuu Seiza—Hill Heaven. Among the books he read was Shinmon Aoki's autobiographical Coffinman: The Journal of a Buddhist Mortician (納棺夫日記, Nōkanfu Nikki), (Note: Shinmon Aoki was born in Toyama Prefecture in 1937, and ran a pub-café until it went out of business, thereafter becoming a mortician as detailed in Coffinman (Tanabe 2009, p. 9).) which exposed Motoki to the world of the nōkanshi for the first time. Motoki said he found a sense of mystery and near-eroticism to the profession that he felt had an affinity with the film world. (Note: Original: 「その職業はとてもミステリアスで、ある種、エロチックで、すごく映画の世界に近いと感じたんです」.)

Getting funding for the project was difficult because of the taboos against death, and the crew had to approach several companies before Departures was approved by Yasuhiro Mase and Toshiaki Nakazawa. According to the film's director, Yōjirō Takita, a consideration in taking on the film was the age of the crew: "we got to a certain point in our lives when death was creeping up to become a factor around us". Kundō Koyama was enlisted to provide the script, his first for a feature film; his previous experience had been in scripting for television and stage. Takita, who had begun his career in the pink film genre before entering mainstream filmmaking in 1986 with Comic Magazine, (Note: Takita's works in the pink film genre included Chikan Onna Kyōshi (Molestful Female Teacher, 1981), Renzoku Bōran (Serial Violent Rape, 1983) and Mahiru no Kirisaki-Ma (Midday Ripper, 1984) (Suzuki 2012). By the time he directed Departures, his more mainstream work had already gained international recognition and awards: the 2003 film When the Last Sword Is Drawn, for instance, won Takita his first Japan Academy Prize for Best Film (Sapia staff 2009). Such a career path was not uncommon for directors in Japan in the 1970s and 1980s; the Japan Academy Prize winner Masayuki Suo, for instance, made his debut with Kandagawa Pervert Wars (Suzuki 2012).) took on the director's role in 2006, after producer Toshiaki Nakazawa presented him with the first draft of the script. In a later interview he stated "I wanted to make a film from the perspective of a person who deals with something so universal and yet is looked down upon, and even discriminated against". Although he knew of the encoffining ceremony, he had never seen one performed.

Production of Departures took ten years, and the work was ultimately only loosely adapted from Coffinman; later revisions of the script were worked on collaboratively by the cast and crew. Although the religious aspects of funerals were important in the source work, the film did not include them. This, together with the fact that filming was completed in Yamagata and not Aoki's home prefecture of Toyama, led to tensions between the production staff and the author. Aoki expressed concern that the film was unable to address "the ultimate fate of the dead". The first edition of the book was broken into three parts; the third, "Light and Life", was an essay-like Buddhist musing on life and death, regarding the "light" seen when one perceived the integration of life and death, that is absent from the film. Aoki believed the film's humanistic approach did away with the religious aspects that were central to the book—the emphasis on maintaining connections between the living and the dead that he felt only religion could provide—and refused to allow his name and that of his book to be used. For the new title, Koyama coined the term okuribito as a euphemism for nōkanshi, derived from the words okuru ("to send off") and hito ("person").

While the book and film share the same premise, the details differ considerably; Aoki attributed these changes to the studio making the story more commercial. Both feature a protagonist who endures uneasiness and prejudice because of his job as a nōkanshi, undergoes personal growth as a result of his experiences, and finds new meaning in life when confronted with death. In both, the main character deals with societal prejudices and misunderstandings over his profession. In Coffinman, the protagonist was the owner of a pub-café that had gone out of business; during a domestic squabble his wife threw a newspaper at him, in which he found an ad for the nōkanshi position. He finds pride in his work for the first time when dealing with the body of the father of a former girlfriend. Koyama changed the protagonist from a bar owner to cellist as he wanted cello orchestration for the film score. Other differences included moving the setting from Toyoma to Yamagata for filming convenience, making the "letter-stone" a greater part of the plot, and an avoidance of heavier scenes, such as religious ones and one in which Aoki talks of seeing "light" in a swarm of maggots. Koyama also added the subplot in which Daigo is able to forgive his late father; taken from a novel he was writing, it was intended to close the story with "some sense of happiness".

=== Casting ===
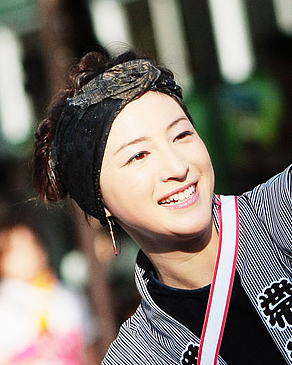
Ryōko Hirosue, who had formerly worked with Takita, was cast as Mika.

Motoki, by then in his early 40s and having built a reputation as a realist, was cast as Daigo. (Note: Motoki was born in 1965 in Saitama and made his professional acting debut in 1981 in the TV drama 2-nen B-gumi Senpachi Sensei (Mr Senpachi of Class 2-B). In 1989 he won the Japan Academy Prize for Best New Actor for his role in Four Days of Snow and Blood (Weekly Biz staff 2009).) Veteran actor Tsutomu Yamazaki was selected for the role of Sasaki; Takita had worked with Yamazaki on We Are Not Alone (1993). Although the character of Mika was initially planned as being the same age as Daigo, the role went to pop singer Ryōko Hirosue, who had previously acted in Takita's Himitsu (Secret) in 1999. (Note: In Himitsu, the personality of a man's dead wife takes over the body of the couple's teenage daughter; Hirosue played both the mother and daughter (Schilling 2009, Funereal flick). She was nominated for a Japan Academy Prize for her performance (Nippon Academy-shō Association, 2000).) Takita explained that a younger actress would better represent the lead couple's growth out of naivety. In a 2009 interview, Takita stated that he had cast "everyone who was on my wish list".

Motoki studied the art of encoffinment first-hand from a mortician, and assisted in an encoffining ceremony; he later stated that the experience imbued him with "a sense of mission ... to try to use as much human warmth as I could to restore [the deceased] to a lifelike presence for presentation to her family". Motoki then drilled himself by practising on his talent manager until he felt he had mastered the procedure, one whose intricate, delicate movements he compared to those of the Japanese tea ceremony. Takita attended funeral ceremonies to understand the feelings of bereaved families, while Yamazaki never participated in the encoffinment training. Motoki also learned how to play a cello for the earlier parts of the film.

To provide realistic bodies while preventing the corpses from moving, after a lengthy casting process the crew chose extras who could lie as still as possible. For the bath house owner Tsuyako Yamashita, this was not possible owing to the need to see her alive first, and a search for a body double was unfruitful. Ultimately, the crew used digital effects to transplant a still image of the actor during the character's funeral scene, allowing for a realistic effect.

=== Filming and post-production ===
The non-profit organization Sakata Location Box was established in December 2007 to handle on-location matters such as finding extras and negotiating locations. After deciding to shoot in Sakata, Location Box staff had two months to prepare for the eighty members of the film crew. Negotiations were slow, as many local property owners lost interest after learning that the filming would involve funeral scenes; those who agreed insisted that shooting take place outside of business hours.

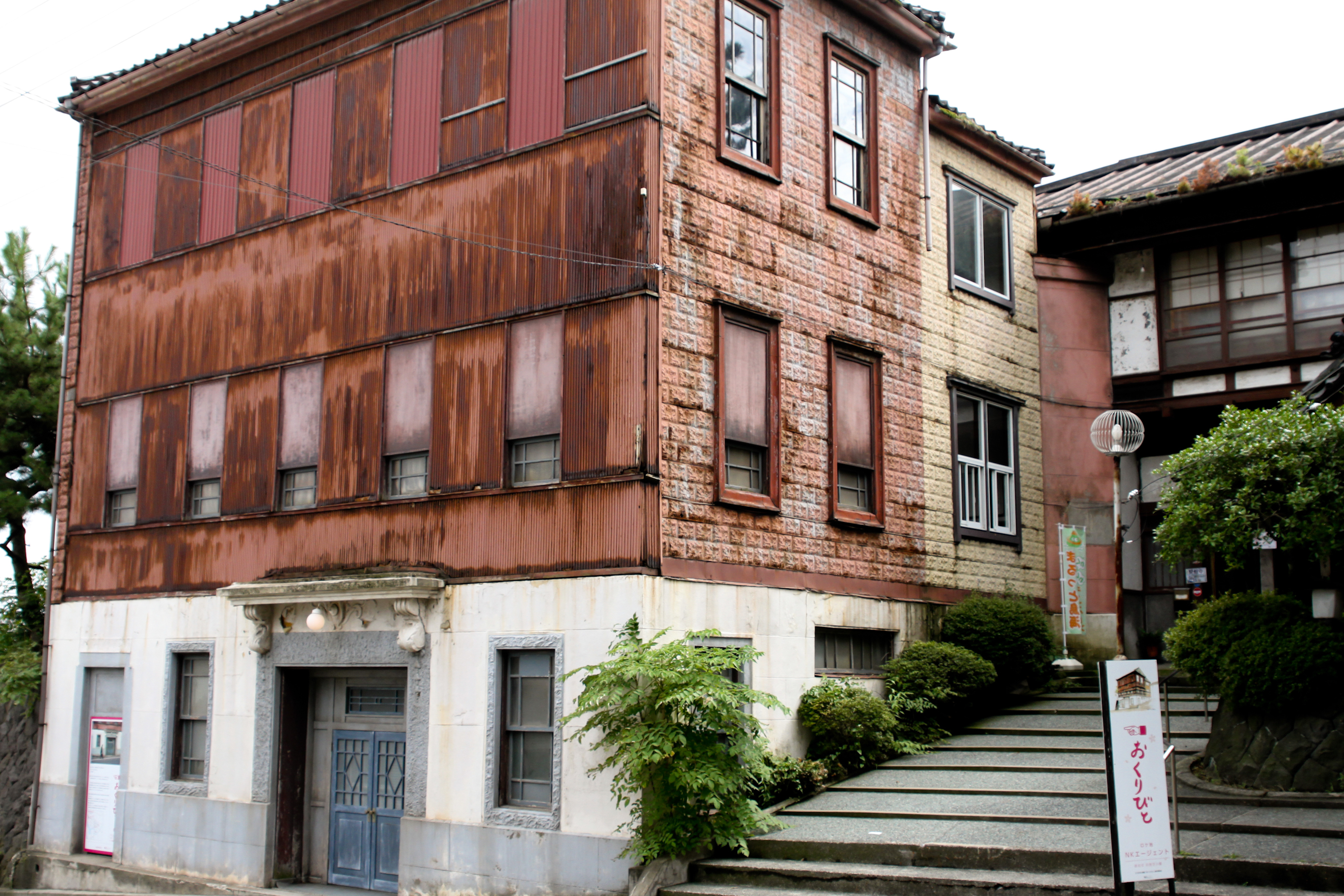
This former restaurant was used as the location of the NK Agent office.

Toyama was both the setting of Coffinman and Takita's home prefecture, but filming was done in Yamagata; this was largely because the national Nōkan Association, headquartered in Hokkaido, had a branch office in Sakata. Some preliminary scenes of snowy landscapes were shot in 2007, and primary filming began in April 2008, lasting 40 days. Locations included Kaminoyama, Sakata, Tsuruoka, Yuza, and Amarume. The NK Agent office was filmed in a three-storey, Western-style building in Sakata built in 1922. Originally a restaurant named Kappō Obata, it went out of business in 1998. The Kobayashis' café, called Concerto in the film, was located in Kaminoyama in a former beauty salon. From a hundred candidates, Takita chose it for its atmosphere as an aged building with a clear view of the nearby river and surrounding mountain range. The scene of the shooting of the training DVD took place in the Sakata Minato-za, Yamagata's first movie theatre, which had been closed since 2002.

The soundtrack to Departures was by Joe Hisaishi, a composer who had gained international recognition for his work with Hayao Miyazaki and Studio Ghibli. Before shooting began, Takita asked him to prepare a soundtrack which would represent the separation between Daigo and his father, as well as the mortician's love for his wife. Owing to the importance of cellos and cello music in the narrative, Hisaishi emphasized the instrument in his soundtrack; he described the challenge of centring a score around the cello as one of the most difficult things he had ever done. This score was played during shooting, which according to Takita "allowed [the crew] to visualize many of the emotions in the film" and thus contributed to the quality of the finished work.

== Style ==
As they are the movie's "central dramatic piece", the encoffining ceremonies in Departures have received extensive commentary. Mike Scott, for instance, wrote in The Times-Picayune that these scenes were beautiful and heartbreaking, and Nicholas Barber of The Independent described them as "elegant and dignified". James Adams of The Globe and Mail wrote that they were a "dignified ritual of calming, hypnotic grace, with sleights of hand bordering on the magicianly". As the film continues, Paul Byrnes of The Sydney Morning Herald opined, the audience gains an improved knowledge of the ceremony and its importance. Viewers see that the ceremonies are not simply about preparing the body, but also about "bring[ing] dignity to death, respect to the deceased and solace to those who grieve", through which the encoffiners are able to help repair broken family ties and heal damage done to those left behind.

There is an idealization of the nōkanshi as presented in the film. In all but one case, the dead are either young or already made-up, such that "the viewer can easily tolerate these images on the screen". The one corpse that had not been found for several days is never shown on screen. No bodies show the gaunt figure of one who has died after a long illness, or the cuts and bruises of an accident victim. Japanologist Mark R. Mullins writes that the gratitude shown in Departures would probably not have occurred in real life; according to Coffinman, there "is nothing lower on the social scale than the mortician, and the truth of the matter is that [the Japanese people] fear the coffinman and the cremator just as much as death and the corpse".

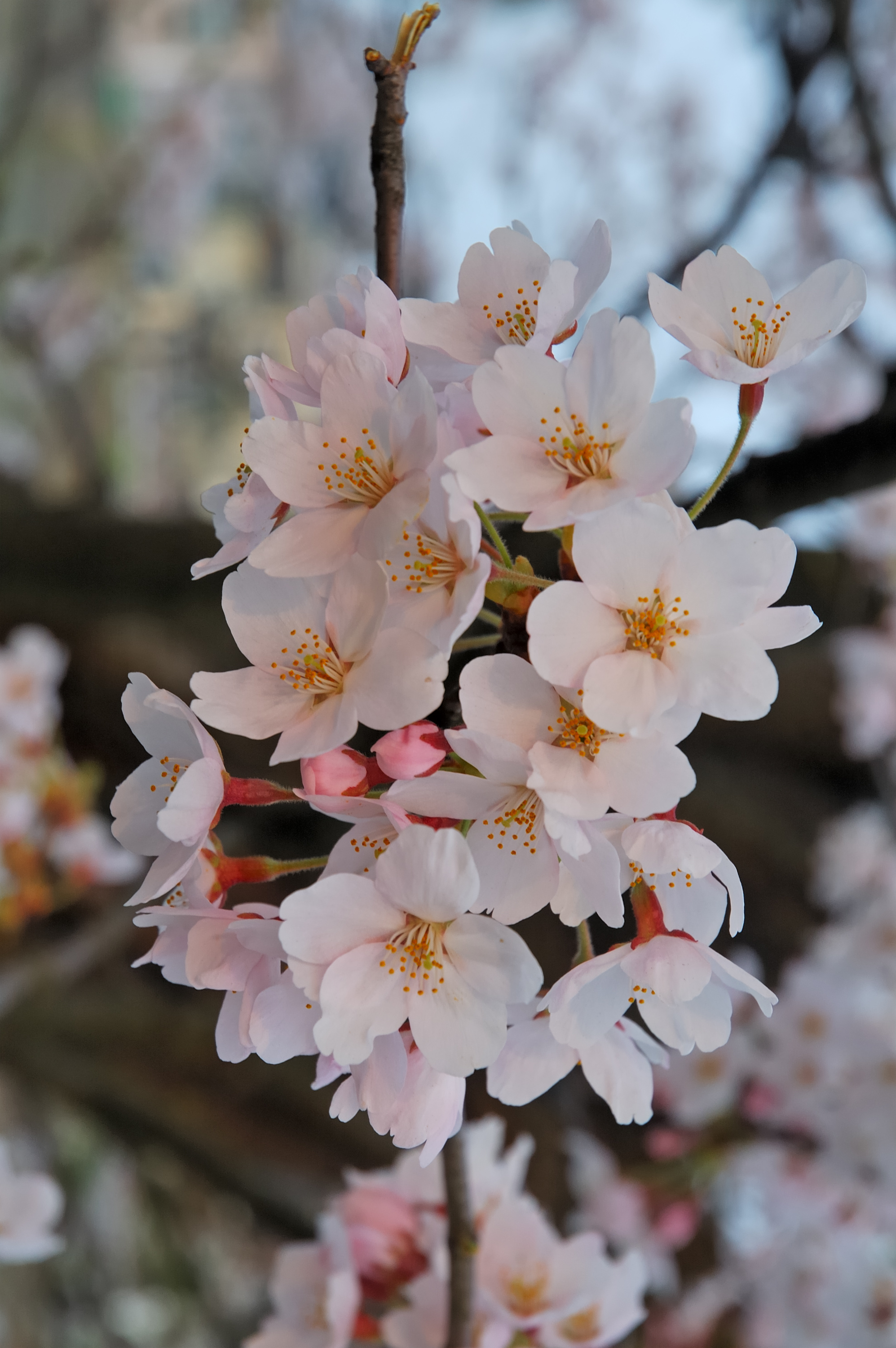
Symbolism has been found in the film's use of cherry blossoms.

In a montage, scenes of Daigo playing his childhood cello while sitting outdoors are interspersed with scenes of encoffining ceremonies. Byrnes believes that this scene was meant to increase the emotional charge of the film, and Roger Ebert of the Chicago Sun-Times considered it a "beautiful fantasy scene" through which the camera is "granted sudden freedom" from the generally standard shots. Yoshiko Okuyama of the University of Hawaii at Hilo found that Daigo's deft movements while playing the cello mirrored the high level of professionalism which he had reached. Several reviewers, such as Leigh Paatsch of the Herald Sun, questioned the need for the shot. Throughout the film's soundtrack, cello music remains dominant. Takita drew parallels between the instrument and the encoffining ceremony, stating that

... ironically, there is something similar between the process of encoffinment and the act of playing the cello. When you play the cello, the instrument has a human, curvaceous form. The cellist embraces that form when playing the instrument, very loving, affectionate. That's very similar, physically, to the actions of the encoffiner, cradling the body, being tender and gentle with it.

Byrnes found that Departures used the symbol of the cherry blossom, a flower which blooms after the winter only to wither soon afterwards, to represent the transience of life; through this understanding, he wrote, Japanese people attempt to define their own existence. Natural symbols are further presented through the changing seasons, which "suggest delicate emotional changes" in the characters, as well as the letter-stones, which represent "love, communication, [and] the baton being passed from generation to generation". The film's settings are used to convey various sensations, including the solitude of the countryside and the intimacy of the public bath house. The colour white, manifested through snow, chrysanthemums, and other objects, is prominent in the film; Okuyama suggests that this, together with the classical music and ritualized hand gestures, represents the sacredness and purity of the death ceremonies.

Departures incorporates aspects of humour, an "unexpected" complement to the theme of death which Ebert suggested may be used to mask the audience's fears. Betsy Sharkey of the Los Angeles Times opines that, through this use of humour, the film avoids becoming too dark and instead acts as a "warmhearted blend" of whimsy and irony. This humour manifests in a variety of manners, such as a scene in which "a mortified Daigo, naked except for a pair of adult diapers, is the reluctant model" for an educational video regarding the encoffining process, as well as a scene in which Daigo discovers that the person he is preparing is a trans woman. (Note: According to Takita, the inclusion of a trans woman in the opening scene was to show both the "grace and gravity of the ritual" as well as indicate that the film would not be a "very heavy" one (Takita 2008, 03:30–03:55).) Takita stated that the addition of humour was deliberate, as "humans are comical by nature", and that the humour did not conflict with the film's darker themes.

== Themes ==
Several critics discussed the theme of death found in Departures. Scott highlighted the contrast between the taboo of death and the value of jobs related to it. He also noted the role of the encoffiner in showing "one last act of compassion" by presenting the dead in a way which preserved proud memories of their life. Initially, Daigo and his family are unable to overcome the taboos and their squeamishness when faced with death. Daigo is alienated from his wife and friends owing to traditional values. Ultimately it is through his work with the dead that Daigo finds fulfilment, and, as Peter Howell of the Toronto Star concluded, viewers realize that "death may be the termination of a life, but it's not the end of humanity". Okuyama writes that, in the end, the film (and the book on which it was based) serves as a "quiet yet persistent protest" against the discrimination which people who deal with death continue to face in modern Japan: death is a normal part of life, not something repulsive.

Along with this theme of death, Takita believed Departures was about life, about finding a lost sense of feeling human; Daigo gains a greater perspective on life and realises the diversity of people's lives only after encountering them in death. This life includes family bonds: Daigo's coming to terms with his father is a major motif, encoffinment scenes focus on the living family members rather than the dead, and even in the NK Agent office, conversation often revolves around family issues. Mika's pregnancy is the catalyst for her reconciliation with Daigo.

Ebert writes that, as with other Japanese films such as Tokyo Story (Yasujirō Ozu; 1953) and The Funeral (Juzo Itami; 1984), Departures focuses on the effect of death on the survivors; the afterlife is not given much discussion. He considered this indicative of a "deep and unsensational acceptance of death" in Japanese culture, one which is to be met not with extreme sorrow, but with contemplation. Takita stated that he intended to focus on the "dialogue between people who have passed away and the families that survive them". The film touches on the question of the afterlife: the cremator likens death to "a gateway", and Okuyama writes that in this sense the cremator is a gatekeeper and the encoffiners are guides.

Byrnes found that Departures leads one to question the extent of modernity's effect on Japanese culture, noting the undercurrent of "traditional attitudes and values" which permeated the film. Although the encoffining ceremony was traditionally completed by the dead person's family, a decreased interest in it opened a "niche market" for professional encoffiners. Okuyama wrote that, through this film, Takita was filling a "spiritual loss" caused by the departure from tradition in modern Japan. Tadao Sato connected this theme of modernity to that of death, explaining that the film's unusually non-bitter treatment of death demonstrated an evolution in Japanese feelings about life and death. He considered the film's treatment of nōkan as an artistic rather than religious ceremony to reflect the agnostic attitudes of modern Japan.

== Release ==
The taboo subject of Departures made prospective distributors wary of taking on the film. Surveys conducted at pre-release screenings placed it at the bottom of the list of films audiences wanted to see. Ultimately, the film's debut at the Montreal World Film Festival in August 2008, which was rewarded with the festival's grand prize, provided the necessary incentive for distributors to select Departures; it finally received its domestic Japanese release on 13 September 2008. Even then, owing to the strong taboo against death, Takita was worried about the film's reception and did not anticipate commercial success, and others expressed concern that the film lacked a clear target audience.

This fear was misplaced; Departures debuted in Japan at fifth place, and during the fifth week of its run hit its peak position at third place. It sold 2.6 million tickets in Japan and generated 3.2 billion yen ($32 million) in box office revenue in the five months after its debut. The film was still showing in 31 theatres when its success at the Academy Awards in February 2009 renewed interest; the number of screens on which it was showing was increased to 188 and the film earned another ¥2.8 billion ($28 million), making a total of ¥6 billion ($60 million). This made Departures the highest-grossing domestic film and 15th top-grossing film overall for 2008. Executive producer Yasuhiro Mase credited this success to the effects of the Great Recession on Japan: viewers who were seeking employment after recently being downsized empathized with Daigo.

From the beginning an international release of the film was intended; as English is considered a key language in international film festivals, English subtitles were prepared. The translation was handled by Ian MacDougall. He believed that the workings of the mortician's world were as far from the experience of most Japanese as from that of a non-Japanese audience. As such he felt a faithful translation was best, without going far to accommodate foreign audiences to unfamiliar cross-cultural elements.

In September 2008, ContentFilm acquired the international rights to Departures, which by that time had been licensed for screening in countries such as Greece, Australia, and Malaysia; the film was ultimately screened in 36 countries. North American distribution was handled by Regent Releasing, and Departures received a limited release in nine theatres beginning on 29 May 2009. Overall, the film earned almost $1.5 million during its North American run before closing on 24 June 2010. In the United Kingdom, Departures premiered on 4 December 2009 and was distributed by Arrow Film Distributors. The film attained a worldwide gross of nearly $70 million.

=== Adaptations and other media ===
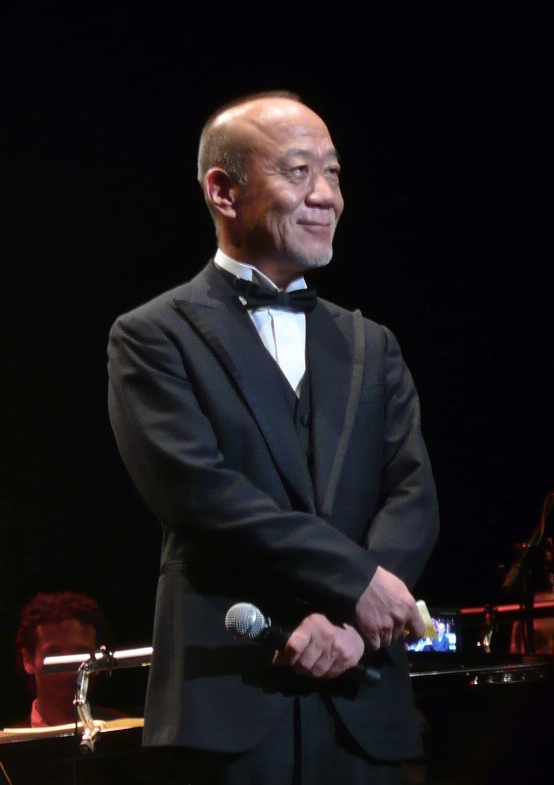
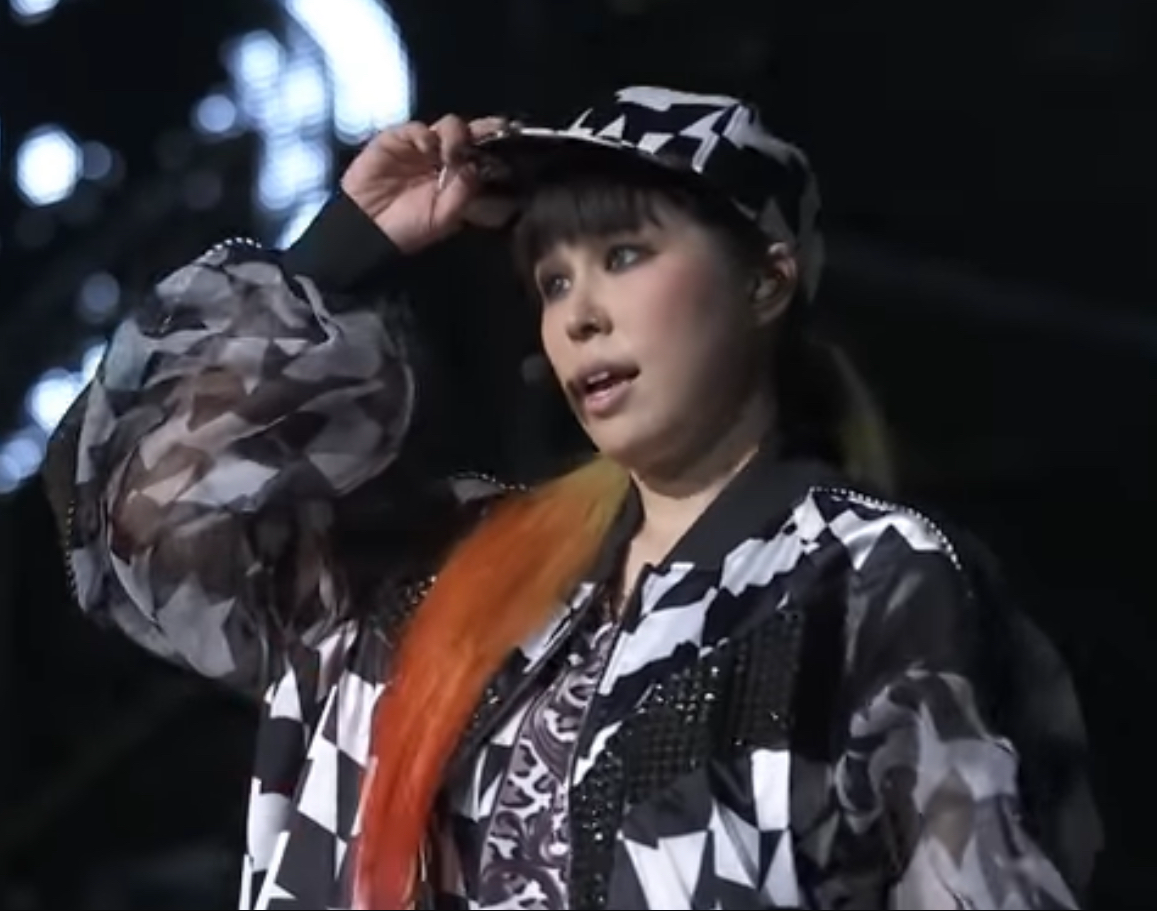
The film's composer Joe Hisaishi (left) worked with Ai (right) on the image song "Okuribito".

Before Departures premiered, a manga adaptation by Akira Sasō was serialized in twelve instalments in the bi-weekly Big Comic Superior, from February to August 2008. Sasō agreed to take on the adaptation as he was impressed by the script. He had the opportunity to view the film before beginning the adaptation, and came to feel that a too-literal adaptation would not be appropriate. He made changes to the settings and physical appearances of the characters, and increased the focus on the role of music in the story. Later in 2008 the serial was compiled in a 280-page volume released by Shogakukan.

On 10 September 2008, three days before the Japanese premiere of Departures, a soundtrack album for the film—containing nineteen tracks from the film and featuring an orchestral performance by members of the Tokyo Metropolitan and NHK Symphony Orchestras—was released by Universal Music Japan. Pop singer Ai provided lyrics to music by Hisaishi for the image song "Okuribito"; performed by Ai with an arrangement for cellos and orchestra, the single was released by Universal Sigma and Island Records on 10 September 2008 along with a promotional video. Sheet music for the film's soundtrack was published by KMP in 2008 (for cello and piano) and Onkyō in 2009 (for cello, violin, and piano).

Shinobu Momose, a writer specializing in novelizations, adapted Departures as a novel. It was published by Shogakukan in 2008. That year the company also released Ishibumi (Note: Original: ishibumi (いしぶみ) "Inscribed stone monument".) (Letter-Stone), an illustrated book on the themes of the film told from the point of view of a talking stone; this book was written by Koyama and illustrated by Seitarō Kurota. The following year Shogakukan published an edition of Koyama's first draft of the screenplay. A stage version of the film, also titled Departures, was written by Koyama and directed by Takita. It debuted at the Akasaka ACT Theater on 29 May 2010, featuring kabuki actor Nakamura Kankurō as Daigo and Rena Tanaka as Mika. The story, set seven years after the close of the film, concerns the insecurities of the couple's son over Daigo's profession.

=== Home releases ===
A dual-layer DVD release, with special features including trailers, making-of documentaries, and a recorded encoffining ceremony, was released in Japan on 18 March 2009. A North American DVD edition of Departures, including an interview with the director, was released by Koch Vision on 12 January 2010; the film was not dubbed, but rather presented with Japanese audio and English subtitles. A Blu-ray edition followed in May. This home release received mixed reviews. Franck Tabouring of DVD Verdict was highly complimentary toward the film and the digital transfer, considering its visuals clean and sharp and the audio (particularly the music) "a pleasure to listen to". Thomas Spurlin, writing for DVD Talk, rated the release as "Highly Recommended", focusing on the "unexpected powerhouse" of the film's quality. Another writer for the website, Jeremy Mathews, advised readers to "Skip It", finding the DVD an apt presentation of the source material—which he considered to "reduce itself to clumsy, mug-filled attempts at broad comedy and awkward, repetitive tear-jerker scenes". Both DVD Talk reviews agreed that the audio and visual quality were less than perfect, and that the DVD's extra contents were poor; Mathews described the interview as the director answering "dull questions in a dull manner".

== Reception ==
=== Critical response ===
Departures received generally positive reviews from critics. The review aggregator Rotten Tomatoes sampled 109 reviewers and judged an 80% approval rating, with an average score of 7.1 out of 10. The website's critical consensus states, "If slow and predictable, Departures is a quiet, life affirming story". The aggregator Metacritic gives the film 68 out of 100, based on 27 reviews, indicating "generally favorable reviews".

==== Domestic reviews ====
Initial reviews in Japan were positive. In Kinema Junpo, Tokitoshi Shioda called Departures a turning point in Takita's career, a human drama capturing both laughter and tears, while in the same publication Masaaki Nomura described the film as a work of supple depth that perhaps indicated a move into Takita's mature period, praising the director for capturing a human feeling from Motoki's earnest encoffining performance. Writing in the Yomiuri Shimbun, Seichi Fukunaga complimented Takita for using a moving, emotive story laden with humour to reverse prejudice against a taboo subject. He commended the performances of Motoki and Yamazaki, particularly their playing the serious Daigo against the befuddled Sasaki.

In the Asahi Shimbun, Sadao Yamane found the film admirably constructed and extolled the actors' performances. Yamane was especially impressed by the delicate hand movements Motoki displayed when he performed the encoffinment ceremony. Tomomi Katsuta in the Mainichi Shimbun found Departures a meaningful story that made the viewer think about the different lives people live, and the significance of someone dying. Writing in the same newspaper, Takashi Suzuki thought the film memorable but predictable, and Yūji Takahashi opined that the film's ability to find nobility in a prejudiced subject was an excellent accomplishment. Shōko Watanabe gave Departures four out of five stars in The Nikkei newspaper, praising the actors' unforced performances.

Following the success of Departures at the Academy Awards, critic Saburō Kawamoto found the film to show a Japan that the Japanese could relate to, in that, in a nation whose customs put great weight on visits to ancestral graves, (Note: It is a Japanese custom to make haka-mairi (墓参り) visits to the family haka (墓), a grave monument to deceased ancestors.) a death was always a family affair. He believed the film had a samurai beauty to it, with its many scenes of families sitting seiza. Critic Yūichi Maeda gave the film a 90% rating, and credited the performances of the two leads for much of the film's success. He praised its emotional impact and its balance of seriousness and humour, but was more critical of the father–son relationship, which he considered overdone. Maeda attributed the film's international success, despite its heavily Japanese content, to its clear depiction of Japanese views on life and death. He found the film's conceptual scale to have an affinity to that of Hollywood (something he considered lacking in most Japanese films).

Reviewer Takurō Yamaguchi gave the film an 85% rating, and found the treatment of its subject charming. He praised its quiet emotional impact and humour, the interweaving of northern Japan scenery with Hisaishi's cello score, and the film's Japanese spirit. Media critic Sadao Yamane found a moving beauty in the dextrous hand movements Sasaki teaches Daigo for preparing bodies, and believed that a prior reading of the original script would deepen the viewer's understanding of the action. Mark Schilling of The Japan Times gave the film four stars out of five, praising the acting though criticizing the apparent idealization of the encoffiners. He concluded that the film "makes a good case for the Japanese way of death."

==== International reviews ====
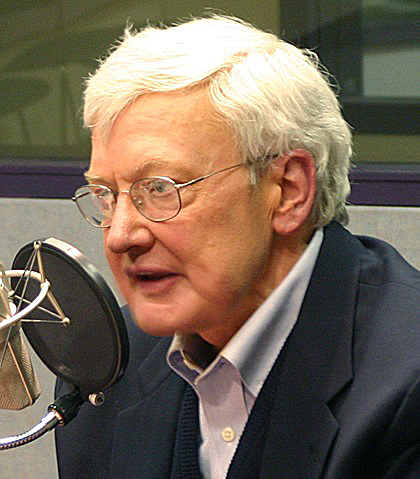
The Chicago Sun-Times' critic Roger Ebert gave Departures a perfect four stars.

Internationally, Departures has received mixed—mostly positive—reviews. Ebert gave the film a perfect four stars, describing it as "rock-solid in its fundamentals" and highlighting its cinematography, music, and the casting of Yamazaki as Sasaki. He found that the result "functions flawlessly" and is "excellent at achieving the universal ends of narrative". He eventually put the movie in his collection of Great Movies; the most recent film on the list. Derek Armstrong of AllMovie gave the film four stars out of five, describing it as "a film of lyrical beauty" which is "bursting with tiny pleasures". In a four-star review, Byrnes described the film as a "moving meditation on the transience of life" which showed "great humanity", concluding "it's a beautiful film but take two hankies." Howell gave the film three stars out of four, praising its acting and cinematography. He wrote that Departures "quietly subverts aesthetic and emotional expectations" without ever losing its "high-minded intent". In a three-and-a-half star review, Claudia Puig of USA Today described Departures as a "beautifully composed" film which, although predictable, was "emotional, poignant" and "profoundly affecting".

Philip French of The Observer considered Departures to be a "moving, gently amusing" film, which the director had "fastidiously composed". Sharkey found it an "emotionally wrenching trip with a quiet man", one which was well cast with "actors who move lightly, gracefully" in the various settings. In Entertainment Weekly, Owen Gleiberman gave the film a B−, considering it "tender and, at times, rather squishy", though certain to affect anyone who had lost a parent. Barber found Departures to be "heartfelt, unpretentious, [and] slyly funny", worth watching (though ultimately predictable). Mike Scott gave the film three and a half stars out of four, finding that it was "a surprisingly uplifting examination of life and loss", with humour which perfectly complemented the "moving and meaningful story", but lent itself to characters "mug[ging] for the camera".

Meanwhile, Kevin Maher of The Times described Departures as a "verklempt comedy" with wearisome "push-button crying", though he considered it saved by the quality of the acting, "stately" directing, and "dreamy" soundtrack. Another mixed review was published in The Daily Telegraph, which described the film as a "safe and emotionally generous crowd-pleaser" that was not worthy of its Academy Award. Philip Kennicott wrote in The Washington Post that the film was "as polished as it is heavy-handed", predictable yet ready to break taboos, immersed in death yet incapable of escaping "the maddening Japanese taste for sentimentality". In Variety, Eddie Cockrell wrote that the film offered "fascinating glimpses" of the encoffining ceremony but should have had a much shorter runtime. Paatsch gave Departures three stars out of five, describing it as a "quaintly mournful flick" that "unfolds with a delicacy and precision that slowly captivates the viewer" but considering some scenes, such as the montage, "needlessly showy flourishes". Edward Porter of The Sunday Times wrote that the film's success at the Academy Awards could be blamed on "a case of the Academy favouring bland sentimentality".

The A.V. Club's Keith Phipps gave Departures a C−, writing that though it featured "handsome shots of provincial life" and encoffining scenes with a "poetic quality", ultimately the film "drips from one overstated emotion to the next". A. O. Scott wrote in The New York Times that the film was "perfectly mediocre", predictable, and banal in its combination of humour and melodrama. Despite its sometimes touching moments, he considered Departures "interesting mainly as an index of the Academy's hopelessly timid and conventional tastes". Tony Rayns of Film Comment gave a scathing review in which he denounced the script as "embarrassingly clunky and obvious", the acting as merely "adequate", and the film as but a "paean to the good-looking corpse". Adams gave Departures two out of four stars, praising the emotionally and visually arresting scenes of encoffinments and "loving attention to the textures, tastes and behaviours of semi-rural Japan" but condemning the predictability of the plot; he wrote that "Forty-five minutes in, [viewers have] prepared a mental checklist of every turn that Daigo Kobayashi will face, then negotiate – and be danged if Takita doesn't deliver on every one".

=== Awards ===
At the 32nd Japan Academy Prize ceremony held in February 2009, Departures dominated the competition. It received a total of thirteen nominations, winning ten, including Picture of the Year, Screenplay of the Year (Koyama), Director of the Year (Takita), and Outstanding Performance by an Actor in a Leading Role (Motoki). In the Outstanding Performance by an Actress in a Leading Role category, Hirosue lost to Tae Kimura of All Around Us, while in the Outstanding Achievement in Art Direction category Departures's Tomio Ogawa lost to Paco and the Magical Book's Towako Kuwashima. Hisaishi, nominated for two Outstanding Achievement in Music awards, won for his scoring of Studio Ghibli's animated film Ponyo. In response to the wins, Motoki said "It feels as if everything miraculously came together in balance this time with Okuribito". (Note: Original: 今回の「おくりびと」っていうのはすべてのバランスが奇跡的につながっていったっていう感じがします。)

Departures was submitted to the 81st Academy Awards as Japan's submission for the Best Foreign Language Film award. Although eleven previous Japanese films had won Academy Awards in other categories, such as Best Animated Feature or Best Costume Design, the as-yet unattained Best Foreign Language Film award was highly coveted in the Japanese film industry. Departures was not expected to win, owing to strong competition from the Israeli and French submissions (Ari Folman's Waltz with Bashir and Laurent Cantet's The Class, respectively), but was ultimately the victor at the February 2009 ceremony. This was considered a surprise by several film critics, and The New York Times's David Itzkoff termed Departures "The Film That Lost Your Oscars Pool for You". Motoki, who was expecting the "wonderful" Israeli submission to win, was also surprised; he described himself as a "hanger-on who just observes the ceremony", and regretted "not walk[ing] with more confidence" upon his arrival. (Note: Departures was not the only Japanese film to receive an Academy Award in the 2009 ceremony; Kunio Katō's La Maison en Petits Cubes took the Academy Award for Best Animated Short Film (Tourtellotte & Reynolds 2009).)

Departures received recognition at a variety of film festivals, including the Audience Choice Award at the 28th Hawaii International Film Festival, the Audience Choice Award at the 15th Vilnius International Film Festival, the Grand Prix des Amériques at the 32nd Montreal World Film Festival, and Best Narrative Film at the 20th Palm Springs International Film Festival. Motoki was selected as best actor at several ceremonies, including at the Asian Film Awards, the Asia Pacific Screen Awards, and the Blue Ribbon Awards; he was also viewers' choice for best actor at the Golden Rooster Awards. At the 29th Hong Kong Film Awards, Departures was selected as Best Asian Film, beating three Chinese films and Ponyo. Following the 21st Nikkan Sports Film Award ceremony, in which Departures won Best Film and Best Director, Takita expressed surprise at the film's awards, saying "I did not know how well my work would be accepted." (Note: Original: "「作品がどういうふうに受け入れられるか分からなかった」と。") By December 2009 the film had won 98 awards.

=== Impact ===
After the film's success, Sakata Location Box set up a hospitality service called Mukaebito—a pun on the film's Japanese title indicating "one who greets or picks up" another, rather than "one who sends off". The service maintains shooting locations and provides maps of these locations for tourists. In 2009, Location Box opened the building that served as the NK Agent office to the public. For a fee, visitors could enter and view props from the film. Under a job creation program, between 2009 and 2013 the organization received ¥30 million from Yamagata Prefecture and ¥8 million from Sakata City for the building's maintenance and administration. The site attracted nearly 120,000 visitors in 2009, though numbers quickly fell; in 2013 there were fewer than 9,000 visitors. Safety fears due to the building's age led to the Sakata municipal government ending the organization's lease, and the building was closed again at the end of March 2014. At the time, the City Tourism division was considering options, such as limiting visits to the first two floors. The building used as the Concerto café has been open to the public since 2009 as the Kaminoyama Concerto Museum, and the Sakata Minato-za cinema has also been opened to tourists. Takita's hometown of Takaoka, Toyama, maintains a Film Resources Museum; staff have reported that at times over a hundred Takita fans visit per day.

The film's success generated greater interest in encoffining and the nōkanshi. Even the model of hearse driven in the film was merchandised: the Mitsuoka Limousine Type 2-04, a smaller, less expensive version of the film's vehicle, was put on the market on 24 February 2009. The manufacturer, Mitsuoka Motors, is located in Takita's home prefecture of Toyama. In 2013, Kouki Kimura, from a family of nōkanshi, founded the Okuribito Academy together with nurse and entrepreneur Kei Takamaru. It offers training in encoffining, embalming, and related practices.

== See also ==
- Cinema of Japan
- List of submissions to the 81st Academy Awards for Best Foreign Language Film
- List of Japanese submissions for the Academy Award for Best Foreign Language Film

== Works cited ==
- Adams, James (11 June 2009). "What a nice funeral – and dull too". The Globe and Mail. Toronto.
- Aera staff (30 September 2013). "Jakkan 31-sai no kōchō ga 'Okuribito Akademī' ni kaketa omoi" 弱冠31歳の校長が「おくりびとアカデミー」に懸けた思い [Youthful 31-year-old President Thoughts on Building the 'Okuribito Academy']. Aera (in Japanese). Osaka. Archived from the original on 5 October 2013.
- Armstrong, Derek. "Departures (review)". Allmovie. Rovi. Archived from the original on 23 May 2014.
- Asahi Shimbun staff (2 April 2010). "Bei Akademī-shō wo jushō sita, eiga Okuribito taibō no butaika eiga no sono ato wo egaku, aratana kandō no monogatari" 米国アカデミー賞を受賞した、映画「おくりびと」待望の舞台化映画のその後を描く、新たな感動の物語 [Academy Award-winning Departures Hoped-for Theatrical Adaptation Depicting What Happens After the Movie, A New Moving Tale]. Doraku (in Japanese). Osaka: Asahi Shimbun. Archived from the original on 12 May 2013.
- Asia Pacific Screen Academy (26 November 2009). "2009 Winners Announced". Brisbane: Asia Pacific Screen Academy. Archived from the original on 29 November 2014.
- Asian Film Awards (2009). "3rd AFA Nominees and Winners". Hong Kong: Asian Film Awards. Archived from the original on 6 October 2014.
- Barber, Nicholas (6 December 2009). "Departures (12A)". The Independent. London. Archived from the original on 21 January 2014.
- Billboard Japan staff. "Okuribito orijinaru ・ saundotorakku" おくりびと オリジナル・サウンドトラック [Departures Original Soundtrack]. Billboard Japan (in Japanese). Archived from the original on 14 July 2014.
- Blair, Gavin J. (13 April 2009). "'Departures' welcomed at Japan boxoffice". Hollywood Reporter. Los Angeles. Archived from the original on 19 August 2014.
- Blair, Gavin J. (16 April 2009). "Yojiro Takita looks for foreign opportunities". Hollywood Reporter. Los Angeles. Archived from the original on 19 August 2014.
- Blair, Gavin J. (1 July 2009). "Departures (Japan)". Hollywood Reporter. Los Angeles. Archived from the original on 19 August 2014.
- Blair, Iain (28 May 2009). "Just a Minute With: Japan's Oscar-winning Yojiro Takita". Reuters. Archived from the original on 15 June 2014.
- "Departures". Box Office Mojo. Archived from the original on 22 May 2014.
- British Board of Film Classification (5 October 2009). "Departures". London: British Board of Film Classification. Archived from the original on 22 May 2014.
- Byrnes, Paul (12 October 2009). "Departures". The Sydney Morning Herald. Sydney. Archived from the original on 19 August 2014.
- CinemaCafé.net staff (31 July 2008). "Okuribito imēji songu de AI×Hisaishi Jō ni yoru ishoku no coraborēshon ga jitsugen!" 『おくりびと』イメージソングでAI×久石譲による異色のコラボレーションが実現！ [Ai and Joe Hisaishi Realize Novel Collaboration with Departures Image Song]. CinemaCafé.net (in Japanese). Tokyo. Archived from the original on 4 June 2015.
- Cinema Topics Online staff (20 January 2009). "Hon'nendo eiga-shō souname!! Okuribito iyoiyo 3-gatsu 18-nichi (sui) DVD rirīsu!" 本年度映画賞総なめ!!『おくりびと』いよいよ3月18日（水）DVDリリース！ [This Year Swept the Film Awards!! Departures Finally to be Released 18 March!]. Cinema Topics Online (in Japanese). Tokyo. Archived from the original on 29 November 2014.
- Cockrell, Eddie (2 September 2008). "Review: 'Departures'". Variety. Los Angeles.
- The Daily Telegraph staff (3 December 2009). "Departures, review". The Daily Telegraph. London. Archived from the original on 29 January 2014.
- Danielsen, Shane (4 December 2009). "Oscar race a big deal for small countries". Variety. Los Angeles. Archived from the original on 30 December 2014.
- Ebert, Roger (27 May 2014). "Departures". rogerebert.com. Chicago. Archived from the original on 25 May 2014.
- Ebert, Roger (5 December 2011). "Departures (2009)". rogerebert.com. Chicago. Archived from the original on 3 July 2014.
- Eiga Ranking Dot Com staff. "Okuribito no shōryaku jōhō" 『おくりびと』の詳細情報 [More details on Departures]. Eiga Ranking Dot Com (in Japanese). Archived from the original on 30 April 2015.
- Frater, Patrick (10 November 2008). "ContentFilm nabs 'Departures' rights". Variety. Los Angeles. Archived from the original on 30 December 2014.
- French, Philip (6 December 2009). "Departures". The Observer. London. Archived from the original on 21 December 2013.
- Fukunaga, Seiji (12 September 2008). "Yūmoa no aru shi no monogatari" ユーモアのある死の物語 [A Tale about Death with a Sense of Humour]. Yomiuri Shimbun (in Japanese) (Evening ed.). Tokyo. p. 11.
- Gleiberman, Owen (27 May 2009). "Departures". Entertainment Weekly. New York. Archived from the original on 27 May 2014.
- Gray, Jason (27 February 2009). "Departures tops Japanese box office following Oscar win". Screen Daily. London.
- Hagiwara, Kichirō (Spring 2009). "Eiga Okuribito soshite Mukaebito toshite" 映画「おくりびと」そして「むかえびと」として [The Film Departures, then as Pick-ups] (PDF). Future Sight (in Japanese) (44). Yamagata: 8–9. Archived from the original (PDF) on 14 July 2014.
- Hale, Mike (15 May 2009). "From 'Pink Films' to Oscar Gold". The New York Times. New York. Archived from the original on 22 August 2023.
- Handa, Takuya (June 2010). "ソール・ベロー序論: 死生観と『おくりびと』を中心に(I)" [Saul Bellow's View of Life and Death with Special Reference to Okuribito (1)] (PDF). Fukuoka University Review of Literature & Humanities (in Japanese). 42 (1). Fukuoka: Fukuoka University: 57–82. ISSN 0285-2764. Archived from the original (PDF) on 5 June 2014.
- Hong Kong Film Awards Association staff. "Dì 29 jiè xiānggǎng diànyǐng jīn xiàng jiǎng dé jiǎng míngdān" 第29屆香港電影金像獎得獎名單 [List of Winners at the 29th Hong Kong Film Awards] (in Chinese). Hong Kong: Hong Kong Film Awards Association. Archived from the original on 15 May 2014.
- Hosaka, Takashi (2014). Isha ga kangaeru "migoto"-na saiki no mukaekata 医者が考える「見事」な最期の迎え方 [What a Doctor Thinks is a "Splendid" Way of Facing End-of-Life] (in Japanese). Tokyo: Kakukawa Shoten. ISBN 978-4-04-110667-9.
- Howell, Peter (12 June 2009). "Departures: Sentimental journey". Toronto Star. Toronto. Archived from the original on 25 May 2014.
- Ide, Kenji (3 March 2009). "Dai 38-kai eiga Okuribito to nihonjin no shiseikan" 第38回 映画「おくりびと」と日本人の死生観 [No. 38: The Film "Departures" and Japanese Views of Life and Death]. China Internet Information Center (in Japanese).
- Itzkoff, Dave (23 February 2009). "'Departures': The Film That Lost Your Oscars Pool for You". The New York Times. New York.
- Iwata, Mayuko (12 September 2008). "Shi no fūkei ha kiyoku utsukushii" 死の風景は清く美しい [Scenes of Death are Pure Beauty]. Chunichi Shimbun (in Japanese) (Evening ed.). Nagoya. p. 8.
- Katsuta, Tomomi (12 September 2008). "Ikigami/Okuribito" イキガミ/おくりびと [Ikigami/Okuribito]. Mainichi Shimbun (in Japanese) (Evening ed.). Tokyo. p. 11.
- Kennicott, Philip. "Departures". The Washington Post. Washington, D.C. Archived from the original on 6 June 2014.
- Kilday, Gregg (19 January 2009). "Palm Springs picks 'Departures'". Hollywood Reporter. Los Angeles. Archived from the original on 11 June 2014.
- Kilday, Gregg (5 May 2009). "Regent acquires 'Departures' rights". Hollywood Reporter. Los Angeles. Archived from the original on 11 June 2014.
- Kim, Hyunchul (2002). "The Purification Process of Death: Mortuary Rites in a Japanese Rural Town". Asian Ethnology. 71 (2). Aichi. Archived from the original on 15 June 2013.
- Kinema Junpo staff. "Okuribito" おくりびと [Departures]. Kinema Junpo (in Japanese). Tokyo. Archived from the original on 10 July 2019.
- Kobayashi, Chiho (4 December 2008). "Sakuhin-shō & kantoku-shō—Okuribito Takita Yōjirō kantoku" 作品賞&監督賞ー「おくりびと」滝田洋二郎監督 [Best Film and Best Director Awards—Departures Director Yōjirō Takita]. Nikkan Sports (in Japanese). Tokyo. Archived from the original on 14 July 2014.
- Kyodo News Staff (24 February 2009). "Mitsuoka Jidōsha no reikyūsha "Okuriguruma" wo hatsubai" 光岡自動車の霊きゅう車 「おくりぐるま」を発売 [Mitsuoka Motors' Okuribito Hearse to be Put on Sale]. 47new (in Japanese). Tokyo: Kyodo News. Archived from the original on 27 February 2009.
- Maeda, Yūichi (13 September 2008). "Okuribito 90-ten (100-ten manten-chū)" 『おくりびと』90点（100点満点中） [Departures 90/100]. 超映画批評 (in Japanese).
- Maher, Kevin (6 December 2009). "Departures". The Times. London.
- Mathews, Jeremy (12 January 2010). "Departures". DVD Talk. Internet Brands. Archived from the original on 25 May 2014.
- Metacritic staff. "Departures Reviews". Metacritic. Archived from the original on 22 January 2015.
- Motion Picture Producers Association of Japan staff. "Shuppin sakuhin ・ jushō-reki" 出品作品・受賞歴 [Exhibition of Works and Awards] (in Japanese). Tokyo: Motion Picture Producers Association of Japan.
- Mullins, Mark R. (2010). "From Departures to Yasukuni Shrine: Caring for the Dead and the Bereaved in Contemporary Japanese Society" (PDF). Japanese Religions. 35 (1 & 2). Kyoto: NCC Center for the Study of Japanese Religions: 101–112. Archived from the original (PDF) on 26 November 2014.
- Moore, Roger (10 July 2009). "The dirty little secret of Oscar winner 'Departures'". Los Angeles Times. Los Angeles. Archived from the original on 19 August 2014.
- Nippon Academy-shō Association staff. "Dai 23-kai Nihon Akademī-shō yūshū sakuhin" 第23回日本アカデミー賞優秀作品 [23rd Japan Academy Prize] (in Japanese). Tokyo: Nippon Academy-shō Association. Archived from the original on 31 October 2014.
- Nippon Academy-shō Association staff. "Dai 32-kai Nihon Akademī-shō yūshū sakuhin" 第32回日本アカデミー賞優秀作品 [32nd Japan Academy Prize] (in Japanese). Tokyo: Nippon Academy-shō Association. Archived from the original on 14 July 2014.
- Nomura, Masaaki (15 September 2008). "Intābyū: Takita Yōjirō" インタービュー：滝田洋二郎 [Interview: Yōjirō Takita]. Kinema Junpō (in Japanese) (1516). Tokyo: 58–61.
- Okuyama, Yoshiko (April 2013). "Shinto and Buddhist Metaphors in Departures". Journal of Religion and Film. 17 (1) 39. Omaha: University of Nebraska Omaha. ISSN 1092-1311.
- Olsen, Mark (24 May 2009). "Yojiro Takita's 'Departures' has a surprising journey". Los Angeles Times. Archived from the original on 13 September 2015.
- Oricon staff (14 September 2008). "Motoki Masahiro, jibun ga okurareru koro "ōnen no meisaku" to natta Okuribito mitai" 本木雅弘、自分がおくられる頃"往年の名作"となった「おくりびと」観たい [Masahiro Motoki, When it is His Time to Depart, he Wants to See his "Old Classic" Departures]. Oricon (in Japanese). Tokyo. Archived from the original on 2 December 2014.
- Paatsch, Leigh (14 October 2009). "Film review – Departures". Herald Sun. Melbourne.
- Pharr, Susan J. (2006). "Burakumin Protest: The Incident at Yōka High School". In Weiner, Michael (ed.). Race, Ethnicity and Migration in Modern Japan: Indigenous and Colonial Others. London: Routledge. pp. 133–145. ISBN 978-0-415-20856-7.
- Phipps, Keith (28 May 2009). "Departures". The A.V. Club. Chicago. Archived from the original on 24 May 2014.
- Ping, Yan; Ying, Bai (13 September 2008). "Jīnjī guójì yǐngzhǎn jǔxíng bānjiǎng diǎnlǐ" 金鸡国际影展举行颁奖典礼 [Rooster International Film Festival Awards Ceremony Held]. 163.com (in Chinese). Guangzhou: NetEase. Archived from the original on 20 August 2014.
- Plutschow, Herbert E. (1990). Chaos and Cosmos: Ritual in Early and Medieval Japanese Literature. Leiden: E. J. Brill. ISBN 978-90-04-08628-9.
- Porter, Edward (5 December 2009). "Departures". The Times. London.
- Puig, Claudia (31 May 2009). "'Departures' is an emotional, poignant trip". USA Today. Tysons Corner, Virginia. Archived from the original on 13 November 2014.
- Rayns, Tony (May–June 2009). "Departures review". Film Comment. New York. Archived from the original on 29 November 2014.
- Rotten Tomatoes staff (29 May 2009). "Okuribito (Departures) – Rotten Tomatoes". Rotten Tomatoes.
- Rovi staff. "Departures|Releases". Allmovie. Rovi. Archived from the original on 23 May 2014.
- Sapia staff (April 2009). "Okuribito to Tsumiki no Ie ga Akademī-shō wo dōji ni jushō" 「おくりびと」と「つみきのいえ」がアカデミー賞を同時に受賞 [Departures and La Maison en Petits Cubes Win Academy Awards at the Same Time]. Sapia (in Japanese). Tokyo: SAPIX小学部. Archived from the original on 28 February 2009.
- Schilling, Mark (5 September 2008). "Okuribito". The Japan Times. Tokyo/Osaka. Archived from the original on 14 July 2014.
- Schilling, Mark (20 February 2009). "Funereal flick out to reap Japan an Oscar". The Japan Times. Tokyo/Osaka. Archived from the original on 14 July 2014.
- Schilling, Mark (28 August 2009). "Producer casts wider net". Variety. Los Angeles. Archived from the original on 25 December 2014.
- Schilling, Mark (11 December 2009). "A decade when Japan's cinema stood up to Hollywood menace". The Japan Times. Tokyo/Osaka. Archived from the original on 14 July 2014.
- Scott, A. O. (28 May 2009). "Making a Living Handling Death". The New York Times. New York. Archived from the original on 8 June 2022.
- Scott, Mike (28 August 2009). "Oscar-winning 'Departures' a surprisingly uplifting examination of loss". The Times-Picayune. New Orleans. Archived from the original on 23 May 2014.
- Sharkey, Betsy (29 May 2009). "'Departures' is an emotionally wrenching trip with a quiet man". Los Angeles Times. Los Angeles. Archived from the original on 23 May 2014.
- Shinohara, Yūko (2013). "Eiga Okuribito no eigo jimaku ni okeru ibunka yōso (nihon-teki yūhyōsei) no hon'yaku hōryaku ni kansuru kōsaku" 映画『おくりびと』の英語字幕における異文化要素(日本的有標性)の翻訳方略に関する考察 [A Study of Strategies for Translating Culture-Specific Items in the English Subtitles of the film Departures] (PDF). 翻訳研究への招待 Invitation to Translation Studies (in Japanese) (9). Tokyo: Japanese Association of Independent Television Stations: 81–98. ISSN 2185-5307. Archived from the original (PDF) on 24 May 2014.
- Shioda, Tokitoshi (15 September 2008). "Kessaku" 傑作 [Masterpiece]. Kinema Junpō (in Japanese) (1516). Tokyo: 62–63.
- Sōma, Manabu (26 February 2009). "Kiseki no "banguruwase"!? Okuribito ni naze gaikokugo eiga-shō ni kagayaita no ka!" 奇跡の"番狂わせ"!? 『おくりびと』はなぜ外国語映画賞に輝いたのか! [Miraculous 'upset'!? Departures is crowned the best foreign-language film of the year!]. The Nikkei (in Japanese). Tokyo. Archived from the original on 29 November 2014.
- Sosnoski, Daniel, ed. (1996). Introduction to Japanese Culture. Rutland/Tokyo: Tuttle. ISBN 978-0-8048-2056-1.
- Sports Nippon staff (15 January 2009). "Motoki Masahiro shuen Okuribito Burū Ribon-shō ni kettei" 本木雅弘主演「おくりびと」ブルーリボン賞に決定 [Masahiro Motoki, star of Departures, chosen for Blue Ribbon Award]. Sports Nippon (in Japanese). Tokyo. Archived from the original on 29 November 2014.
- Spurlin, Thomas (24 January 2010). "Departures". DVD Talk. Internet Brands. Archived from the original on 25 May 2014.
- Suzuki, Yosiaki (5 April 2012). "Takita Yōjirō, Suo Masayuki: Pinku eiga kara sudatta mei-kantoku ōi" 滝田洋二郎、周防正行他 ピンク映画から巣立った名監督多い [Yōjirō Takita, Masayuki Suo: Many Famous Film Directors Come Out of Pink Film]. News Post Seven (in Japanese). Tokyo. Archived from the original on 17 April 2015.
- Tabouring, Franck (28 January 2010). "Departures". DVD Verdict. Archived from the original on 14 July 2014.
- Takabe, Tsutomu; Wakatsuki, Yūji (2009). Mō hitori no Okuribito もうひとりの「おくりびと」 [Another "Okuribito"] (in Japanese). Tokyo: Toho Publishing. ISBN 978-4-8094-0786-4.
- Takahashi, Masahiro (10 September 2008). "Eiga de kikaku, manga wo tsukuru "komikaraizu" ga ryūsei" 映画で企画、漫画を作る 「コミカライズ」が隆盛 [In the Movies, Planning for Comics, Komikaraizu is Flourishing]. Asahi Shimbun (in Japanese). Osaka. Archived from the original on 26 November 2014.
- Takita, Yōjirō (2008). "Interview with Yōjirō Takita" Departures (DVD). E1 Entertainment. OCLC 785846111.
- Tanabe, Hideyuki (2 March 2009). "Dai 81-kai Bei Akademī-shō gaikokygo eiga jushō Okuribito" 第81回米アカデミー賞 外国語映画受賞 「おくりびと」 [81st American Academy Awards Foreign-Language Film Winner Okuribito]. Mainichi Shimbun (in Japanese). Tokyo. p. 9.
- Tourtellotte, Bob; Reynolds, Isabel (23 February 2009). "Mortician tale "Departures" surprises with Oscar". Reuters. Archived from the original on 13 May 2014.
- Tsukada, Izumi (15 September 2008). FACE08 本木雅弘 [Face 08: Motoki Masahiro]. Kinema Junpo (in Japanese) (1516). Tokyo: 1–3.
- "Okuribito orijinaru saundotorakku [CD]" 「おくりびと」オリジナルサウンドトラック [CD] ['Departures' Original Soundtrack [CD]] (in Japanese). Universal Music. Archived from the original on 15 July 2014.
- Watanabe, Shōko (12 September 2008). "Okuribito: Sugasugashiku shi to mukiau" おくりびと：すがすがしく 死と向き合う [Departures: Freshly Facing Death]. The Nikkei (in Japanese) (Evening ed.). Tokyo. p. 20.
- Weekly Biz staff (9 May 2009). "Gachi! Bout.52.51 Masahiro Motoki/Yōjirō Takita" ガチ！BOUT.52.51 本木雅弘/滝田洋二郎. Weekly Biz (in Japanese). Archived from the original on 30 November 2014.
- Okuribito: on record: Onkyō piano torio (piano bansō/baiorin ・ chero pāto-fu tsuki) おくりびと : on record : オンキョウピアノトリオ(ピアノ伴奏/バイオリン・チェロパート譜付き) [Departures on Record: Music for an Acoustic Trio]. OCLC 676204123.
- Okuribito: piano & chero ・ pīsu おくりびと : ピアノ&チェロ・ピース [Departures: Piano and Cello Pieces]. OCLC 676569003.
- Okuribito. OCLC 271435675.
- Yamagata Community Shinbun staff (22 May 2009). "Okuribito no roke-chi būmu Kaminoyama mo atsui zo!" おくりびとロケ地ブーム 上山も熱いぞ！ [Departures Film Location Boom: Kaminoyama is Hot, Too!]. Yamagata Community Shinbun (in Japanese). Yamagata. Archived from the original on 19 August 2014.
- Yamagata News Online staff (22 February 2014). "Okuribito roke-chi, raigetsu de kaikan he rōkyū-ka, nyūkansha mo genshō ・ Sakata" 「おくりびと」ロケ地、来月で閉館へ 老朽化、入館者も減少・酒田 [Departures Location to be Closed Next Month Due to Age, Decline in Visitors・Sakata]. Yamagata News Online (in Japanese). Yamagata. Archived from the original on 29 November 2014.
- Yamagata Television System staff (13 May 2009). "Okuribito de Minato-za fukkatsu" 「おくりびと」で「港座」復活 [Minato-za Restored in Departures]. Yamagata Television System (in Japanese). Yamagata. Archived from the original on 14 July 2014.
- Yamaguchi, Takurō. "Okuribito" おくりびと [Departures]. Eiga Judge (in Japanese). Archived from the original on 28 February 2009.
- Yamane, Sadao (12 September 2008). "Okuribito: zetsumyō no te no ugoki ni kokoro-utarete" 「おくりびと」：絶妙な手の動きに心打たれた [Okuribito: Touched by Exquisite Hand Movements]. Asahi Shimbun (in Japanese) (Evening ed.). Osaka. p. 5.
- Yamane, Sadao (2012). "映画が立ち上がる瞬間". Nihon eiga jihyō henshū 2000–2010 日本映画時評集成 2000–2010 [Collected Commentary on Japanese Film 2000–2010] (in Japanese). Tokyo: Kokusho Kankōkai. pp. 350–353. ISBN 978-4-336-05482-1.
- Yomiuri Shimbun staff (22 February 2014). "Okuribito roke-chi, sangatsu-matsu de kōkai shūryō he" 「おくりびと」ロケ地、3月末で公開終了へ [Okuribito Shooting Locations to be Opened to the Public from Late March]. Yomiuri Shimbun (in Japanese). Tokyo. Archived from the original on 5 May 2015.
- Yoshida, Narihiko (2010). Aidea wo katachi ni suru shigoto-jutsu: bijinesu ・ purodyūsā no nanatsu no nōryoku アイデアをカタチにする仕事術: ビジネス・プロデューサーの7つの能力 [Giving Shape to an Idea: Seven Skills of Business Producers] (in Japanese). Tokyo: Toyo Keizai. ISBN 978-4-492-04367-7.
