= Departures (soundtrack) =

Departures Original Soundtrack

Soundtrack album by Joe Hisaishi
- Released: 10 September 2008
- Genre: Film score
- Length: 44:48
- Label: A&M

Joe Hisaishi chronology
Ponyo (2008)	Departures (2008)	I'd Rather Be A Shellfish (2008)

The soundtrack to the Japanese drama film Departures (Japanese: おくりびと, Hepburn: Okuribito; "one who sends off") directed by Yōjirō Takita featured musical score written and produced by Joe Hisaishi and featured orchestral performances from the Tokyo Metropolitan and NHK Symphony Orchestras. It was released as Departures Original Soundtrack (おくりびと オリジナル・サウンドトラック, Okuribito orijinaru saundotorakku) (Note: also marketed as Okuribito Original Soundtrack) on 10 September 2008, three days before the film's release, by A&M Records. Also preceding the album, is the image song "Okuribito", the film's title theme, performed by Ai, being released on the same date.

== Development ==
Before filming began, Yōjirō Takita asked him to prepare a soundtrack which would represent the separation between Daigo and his father, as well as the mortician's love for his wife. Owing to the importance of cellos and cello music in the narrative, Hisaishi emphasized the instrument in his soundtrack; he described the challenge of centring a score around the cello as one of the most difficult things he had ever done. This score was played during shooting, which according to Takita "allowed [the crew] to visualize many of the emotions in the film" and thus contributed to the quality of the finished work.

== Promotional single ==
The title theme is the image song for the film, that had been composed by Hisaishi with lyrics written and performed by Ai. After watching the preview of the film, she worked closely with Hisaishi to add lyrics to the instrumental piece he composed. She initially felt nervous on the kind of lyrics that suits the film, but felt respected on working with the composer, who assisted her on the music. Hisaishi further arranged the cellos and orchestral pieces. The single was released by Universal Sigma and Island Records on 10 September 2008 along with a promotional video. However, Ai performed the track live on 6 September at the Music Fair 21.

== Sheet music ==
Sheet music for the film's soundtrack was published by KMP in 2008 (for cello and piano) and Onkyō in 2009 (for cello, violin, and piano).

== Track listing ==
No.	Title	Length
1.	"Shine of Snow I"	1:12
2.	"Nohkana"	3:10
3.	"Kaisan"	0:53
4.	"Good-by Cello"	2:16
5.	"New Road"	1:15
6.	"Model"	0:47
7.	"First Contact"	1:51
8.	"Washing"	0:34
9.	"Kizuna I"	1:57
10.	"Beautiful Dead I"	3:12
11.	"Departures – On Record"	1:51
12.	"Gui-Dance"	2:26
13.	"Shine of Snow II"	2:25
14.	"Ave Maria – Departures"	5:29
15.	"Kizuna II"	2:04
16.	"Beautiful Dead II"	2:37
17.	"Father"	1:40
18.	"Departures – Memory"	4:10
19.	"Departures – Ending"	4:59
Total length:		44:48

== Reception ==
Music critic Jonathan Broxton of Movie Music UK wrote "There is so much beauty and effortless grace, such a richness of texture and instrumental performance in Joe Hisaishi's music, it's amazing he hasn't been discovered by the wider world. Departures marks yet another magnificent example in his already swollen filmography." Complimenting the haunting musical score as one of the striking features of the film, Michael Sullivan a critic writing for The Japan Society of the UK commented "The music flows beautifully with Yojiro Takita's scenes such as nature, sunsets and a cellist playing his instrument next to rice fields. The film portrays with extreme tenderness the passing away of loved ones, how the families cherished them, while reminding us of the reasons for living." Al Alexander, writing for The Patriot Ledger felt that the score "accentuates the mournful tones of an instrument synonymous with sadness and longing". Maggie Lee of The Hollywood Reporter called the score as "unabashedly romantic", while Marc Savlov of The Austin Chronicle called it as "grimly wonderful".

== Accolades ==
At the 32nd Japan Academy Film Prize held in 20 February 2009, Hisaishi was nominated for Outstanding Achievement in Music for Departures' score, but won the same award for Ponyo (2008).

== Sources ==
- Takita, Yōjirō (2008). "Interview with Yōjirō Takita" Departures (DVD). E1 Entertainment. OCLC 785846111.
- Nippon Academy-shō Association staff. "Dai 22-kai Nihon Akademī-shō yūshū sakuhin" 第22回日本アカデミー賞優秀作品 [32nd Japan Academy Prize] (in Japanese). Tokyo: Nippon Academy-shō Association. Archived from the original on 14 July 2014.
- Billboard Japan staff. "Okuribito orijinaru ・ saundotorakku" おくりびと オリジナル・サウンドトラック [Departures Original Soundtrack]. Billboard Japan (in Japanese). Archived from the original on 14 July 2014.
- CinemaCafé.net staff (31 July 2008). "Okuribito imēji songu de AI×Hisaishi Jō ni yoru ishoku no coraborēshon ga jitsugen!" 『おくりびと』イメージソングでAI×久石譲による異色のコラボレーションが実現！ [Ai and Joe Hisaishi Realize Novel Collaboration with Departures Image Song]. CinemaCafé.net (in Japanese). Tokyo. Archived from the original on 4 June 2015.
- CinemaToday Staff (31 July 2008). "AIと久石譲のコラボが映画『おくりびと』で実現！広末もまぶた熱くする｜シネマトゥデイ". シネマトゥデイ (in Japanese). Archived from the original on 18 January 2022.
- Natasha Inc. "AIが「MUSIC FAIR」で話題の映画主題歌初披露". 音楽ナタリー (in Japanese).
- Broxton, Jonathan (29 May 2009). "Departures (Okuribito) – Joe Hisaishi". Movie Music UK. Archived from the original on 6 February 2011.
- Sullivan, Michael. "Review – Departures (おくりびと)". The Japan Society of the UK.
- Alexander, Al. "MOVIE REVIEW: 'Departures' brings life and death into harmony". The Patriot Ledger. Archived from the original on 30 January 2023.
- Lee, Maggie (14 November 2008). "Departures — Film Review". The Hollywood Reporter. Archived from the original on 7 January 2023.
- Savlov, Marc (28 August 2009). "Movie Review: Departures". The Austin Chronicle. Archived from the original on 27 February 2021.
- "Okuribito orijinaru saundotorakku [CD]" 「おくりびと」オリジナルサウンドトラック [CD] ['Departures' Original Soundtrack [CD]] (in Japanese). Universal Music. Archived from the original on 15 July 2014.
- "Okuribito: on record: Onkyō piano torio (piano bansō/baiorin ・ chero pāto-fu tsuki)" おくりびと : on record : オンキョウピアノトリオ(ピアノ伴奏/バイオリン・チェロパート譜付き) / Okuribito [Departures on Record: Music for an Acoustic Trio]. WorldCat. OCLC 676204123.
- "Okuribito: piano & chero ・ pīsu" おくりびと : ピアノ&チェロ・ピース / Okuribito [Departures: Piano and Cello Pieces]. WorldCat. OCLC 676569003.
