= Sakata Minato-za =

Cinema in Yamagata, Japan

- 酒田港座
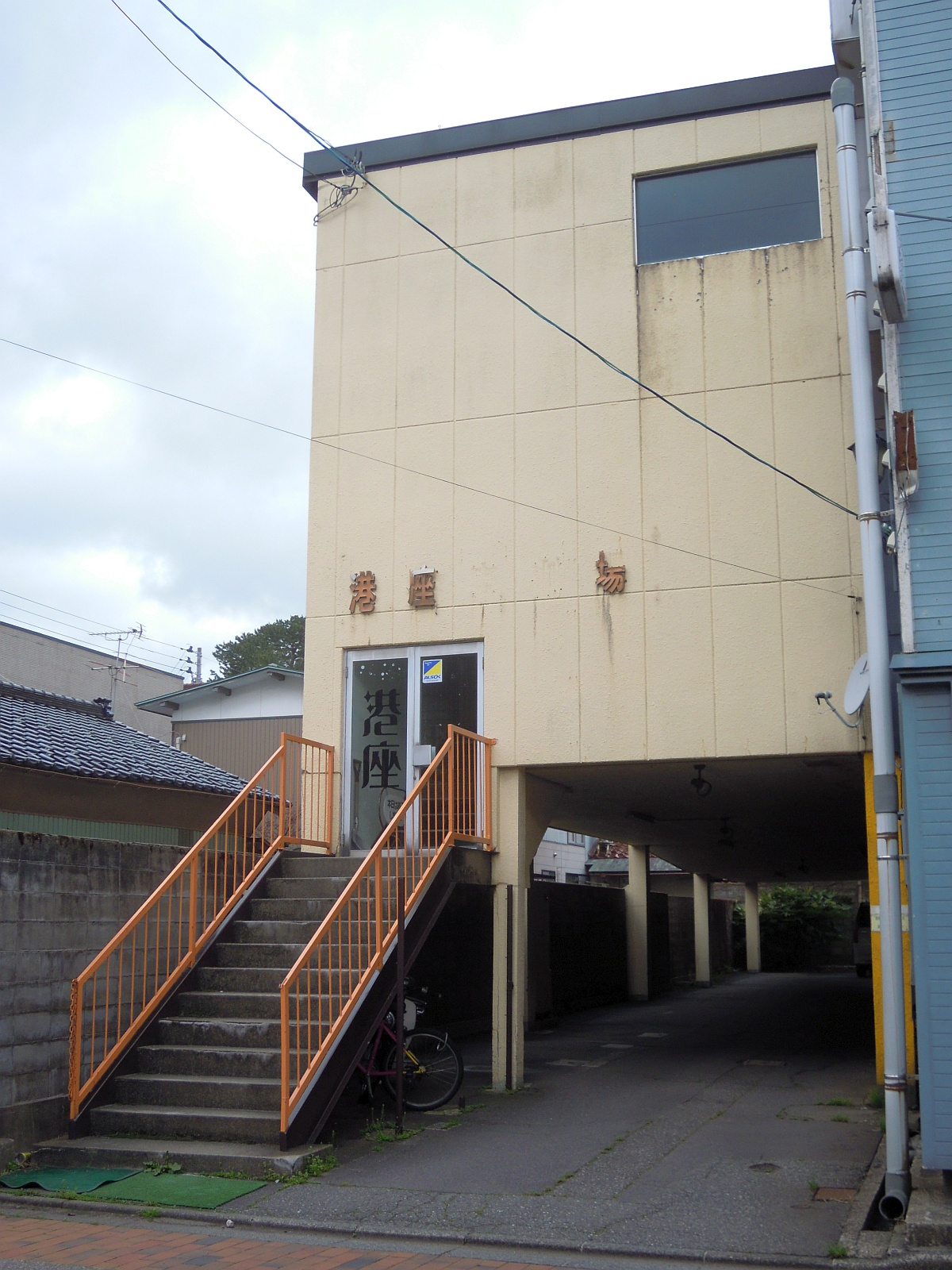

General information
- Location: 1 Chome-6-9 Hiyoshichō, Sakata, Yamagata, Japan
- Coordinates: 38.92°N 139.8325°E
- Opened: 1887
- Renovated: 1954

Other information
- Seating capacity: 290 in three rooms

Website
- http://minatoza.exblog.jp/

The Sakata Minato-za (Japanese: 酒田港座) is a cinema in Sakata, Yamagata, Japan; it was the first to open in the city. Established as a playhouse in 1887, it became a cinema in 1910 and was popular in the 1970s. After a period of decreased patronage, in 2002 it was shut down. After the cinema was used as a filming location for Yōjirō Takita's 2008 film Departures, public interest in the site was revived; the cinema reopened in 2009.

== History ==
Showman Shinkichi Nagasaki had the Minato-za theatre building constructed in Sakata Harbour in 1887. It could seat up to a thousand people, and came to be known as the leading theatre in the Tōhoku region of northern Japan, holding drama and kabuki performances. Sake brewery Kanakyū (Note: Now owned by Tōhoku Meijō) was involved in the management of the theatre, and when Satō Kyūkichi II inherited the family business he also took over management of Minato-za. Satō had high standing in Sakata, and spent time as the head of both the Sakata municipal council and Chamber of Commerce. His strong ties with the theatre industry led to him taking under his care the sons of the theatre industry chairman when they had to evacuate their homes during World War II. The boys were future actors Tomisaburo Wakayama and Shintaro Katsu.

In 1910 Satō had the theatre adapted to screen films; it was the first cinema in Sakata. This building burnt down in 1954, but was immediately rebuilt. The cinema specialized in Japanese films by companies such as Matsutake and Toei. A source of pride was that films debuted at Minato-za at the same time they appeared in Tokyo and other large cities; at the time this was unusual. Minato-za had competition from Satō's estranged son Kyūichi, who at some point opened Green House, a cinema specializing in Western films.

The theatre was a hub of activity in Sakata during the early 1970s and welcomed many patrons; at the time it was one of five active cinemas in the city. It would often screen films while their Tokyo runs were still ongoing, which was a source of pride to the Sakata populace. In 1976 the harbour area around Minato-za burned to the ground, consuming Green House and two other competing cinemas. Minato-za, however, survived. The cinema soon had three screens of varying sizes: one for an audience of 180, one for an audience of 80, and one for an audience of 30 people. Over the following decades a diversification in available entertainment venues, such as television and multiplex theatres with large parking lots, led to a decline in patronage. In 2002 the Sakata Minato-za, the last cinema in the city, was closed.

In 2008 the non-profit Sakata Location Box, tasked with finding shooting locations for the film Departures, acquired the building, which was little more than an abandoned shell; the film's director, Yōjirō Takita, agreed to take the property on after his first viewing. Minato-za was restored and ultimately used to shoot a scene in which the main character, Daigo (played by Masahiro Motoki), portrays a corpse for a training video.

After the box office and Academy Awards success of Departures, its filming locations – including Minato-za – became popular tourist attractions. In June 2009 the cinema was reopened as Sakata Minato-za as part of an event termed the "Sakata Minato-za Revival Festival" ("港座復活祭"); Takita described the cinema's reopening as being "like something out of a movie". Since then the cinema has hosted new screenings, using a DVD player and projector as the original system had decayed too much. It is also used for other activities. On days when not hosting film-viewing events for local groups, the cinema – which has 映像とサウンドのきらめき ("Glittering Images and Sound") written on the facade – is open to the public and tour groups.

As part of the efforts to resurrect cinema-going as a downtown activity, local restaurants have offered discounts for customers who present ticket stubs. Seki Kōichi of Sakata Location Box expressed hope in 2010 of someday holding a film festival at Minato-za, with the goal of cultivating future filmmakers.

== Works cited ==
- "Departures". Japan National Tourism Organization. Archived from the original on 25 July 2014.
- "Sakata Theater Revived". Tohoku Times. 20 June 2009. Archived from the original on 16 July 2014.
- Yamaguchi, Yasushi (January 2010). "歴史 を語る建物たち" [Buildings Tell of History] (PDF). Future Sight (in Japanese). pp. 30–31. Archived (PDF) from the original on 18 July 2014.
- Yamagata Television System staff (13 May 2009). 「おくりびと」で「港座」復活 [Minato-za Restored in Departures]. Yamagata Television System (in Japanese). Archived from the original on 14 July 2014.
