= 32nd Japan Academy Film Prize =

Japanese film awards in 2009

- Date: February 20, 2009
- Site: Grand Prince Hotel New Takanawa, Tokyo, Japan
- Hosted by: Hiroshi Sekiguchi; Kirin Kiki

Highlights
- Most awards: Departures (10)
- Most nominations: Departures (13)

The 32nd Japan Academy Film Prize (第32回日本アカデミー賞) ceremony was held by the Japan Academy Prize Association to honor the best films of 2008 selected by the association on February 20, 2009. NTV broadcast the event, which took place at the Grand Prince Hotel New Takanawa in Tokyo, Japan. The nominations for the Awards were announced on December 18, 2008.

== Nominees ==
=== Awards ===
Picture of the Year	Animation of the Year
Departures; Kabei: Our Mother; Climber's High; The Magic Hour; Suspect X	Ponyo on the Cliff by the Sea; Doraemon: Nobita and the Green Giant Legend; The Sky Crawlers; Detective Conan: Full Score of Fear; One Piece The Movie: Episode of Chopper Plus: Bloom in the Winter, Miracle Sakura
Director of the Year	Screenplay of the Year
Yōjirō Takita – Departures; Tetsuya Nakashima – Paco and the Magical Book; Masato Harada – Climber's High; Kōki Mitani – The Magic Hour; Yoji Yamada – Kabei: Our Mother	Kundō Koyama – Departures; Kenji Uchida – After School; Masato Katō, Izuru Narushima, Masato Harada – Climber's High; Kōki Mitani – The Magic Hour; Yoji Yamada and Emiko Hiramatsu – Kabei: Our Mother
Outstanding Performance by an Actor in a Leading Role	Outstanding Performance by an Actress in a Leading Role
Masahiro Motoki – Departures; Kōichi Satō – The Magic Hour; Shinichi Tsutsumi – Climber's High; Kenichi Matsuyama – Detroit Metal City; Kōji Yakusho – Paco and the Magical Book	Tae Kimura – All Around Us; Yukie Nakama – Watashi wa Kai ni Naritai; Ryōko Hirosue – Departures; Sayuri Yoshinaga – Kabei: Our Mother, Maboroshi no Yamataikoku
Outstanding Performance by an Actor in a Supporting Role	Outstanding Performance by an Actress in a Supporting Role
Tsutomu Yamazaki – Departures; Tadanobu Asano – Kabei: Our Mother; Masato Sakai – Climber's High; Shinichi Tsutsumi – Suspect X; Yasufumi Terawaki – AIBOU: The Movie	Kimiko Yo – Departures; Kirin Kiki – Still Walking; Rei Dan – Kabei: Our Mother; Yasuko Matsuyuki – Detroit Metal City, Suspect X
Popularity Award	Newcomer of the Year
Suspect X (Production Category); Kenichi Matsuyama – Detroit Metal City (Actor Category)	Teppei Koike – The Homeless Student; Shota Matsuda – Ikigami; Ayaka Wilson – Paco and the Magical Book; Ayane Nagabuchi – Sanbongi Nōgyō Koukou, Bajutsubu: Mōmoku no Uma to Shōjo no Jitsuwa; Saki Fukuda – The Cherry Orchard: Blossoming; Yuriko Yoshitaka – Snakes and Earrings
Outstanding Achievement in Music	Outstanding Achievement in Cinematography
Joe Hisaishi – Ponyo on the Cliff by the Sea; Kiyoko Ogino – The Magic Hour; Gabriele Roberto – Paco and the Magical Book; Isao Tomita – Kabei: Our Mother; Joe Hisaishi – Departures	Takeshi Hamada – Departures; Shōichi Atō and Atsushi Ozawa – Paco and the Magical Book; Gen Kobayashi – Climber's High; Mutsuo Naganuma – Kabei: Our Mother; Kōsuke Matsushima – Watashi wa Kai ni Naritai
Outstanding Achievement in Lighting Direction	Outstanding Achievement in Art Direction
Hitoshi Takaya – Departures; Susumu Takakura – Paco and the Magical Book; Naoyuki Hori – Climber's High; Takeshi Nakasu – Kabei: Our Mother; Tarō Kimura – Watashi wa Kai ni Naritai	Towako Kuwajima – Paco and the Magical Book; Fumio Ogawa – Departures; Yōhei Taneda – The Magic Hour; Mitsuo Degawa – Kabei: Our Mother; Katsuhiro Fukuzawa – Climber's High
Outstanding Achievement in Sound Recording	Outstanding Achievement in Film Editing
Satoshi Ono and Osamu Onodera – Departures; Kazumi Kishida – Kabei: Our Mother; Tetsuo Segawa – The Magic Hour; Shin Fukuda and Tadao Tasai – Paco and the Magical Book; Masato Yano – Climber's High	Masaaki Kawashima – Departures; Iwao Ishii – Kabei: Our Mother; Sōichi Ueno – The Magic Hour; Yoshiyuki Koike – Paco and the Magical Book; Hiroshi Sunaga and Yūjin Harada – Climber's High
Outstanding Foreign Language Film	Special Award from the Chairman
The Dark Knight; The Bucket List; No Country for Old Men; Lust, Caution; Red Cliff: Part I	Kon Ichikawa (Director); Ken Ogata (Actor)
Shigeru Okada Prize	Special Award from the Association
Studio Ghibli	Satoshi Narumi (Physical Effect); Hiroyuki Hatori (Physical Effect); Tadaomi Miya (Dog Trainer)
