= Maiko Itō =

Japanese actress

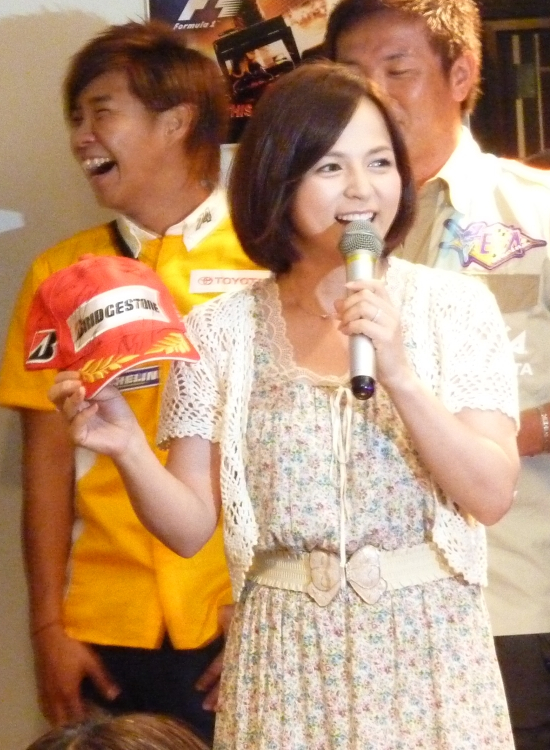
- Maiko Itō in September 2010
- Born: August 18, 1964 (age 62); Aichi, Japan
- Occupation: Actress
- Years active: 1982–present

Maiko Itō (いとう まい子, Itō Maiko; born 18 August 1964 in Nagoya, Japan) is a Japanese actress.

== Filmography ==
=== Film ===
- Itoshino Half Moon (1987)
- Shall We Dance? (1996)
- Mutant Girls Squad (2010), Sayuri
- Runway Beat (2011), Mei's mother
- Lady in White (2018)
- School Meals Time: Final Battle (2020), Fumie Makino
- School Meals Time: Graduation (2022), Fumie Makino
- School Meals Time: Road to Ikameshi (2024), Fumie Makino
- School Meals Time: School Excursion Inferno (2025), Fumie Makino
- School Meals Time: Umasoge Kingdom (2027), Fumie Makino

=== Television ===
- Kōkōsei Fūfu (1983), Noriko "Tenko" Anzai
- Furyō Shōjo to Yobarete (1984), Shōko Soga
- Dokuganryū Masamune (1987), Senhime
- Gregory Horror Show (1999), My Son
- Tensou Sentai Goseiger (2010), Moune's Mother (ep. 25)
- What Will You Do, Ieyasu? (2023)

=== Japanese dub ===
- The Wild Robot (2024), Pinktail
