= Kundō Koyama =

Japanese writer

Kundō Koyama (小山薫堂) (born 1964) is a Japanese writer. He is best known for scripting the television series Iron Chef and the 2009 Academy Award for Best Foreign Language Film recipient Departures. Koyama has also worked under the pen name Udon Kumayakko, an anagram of his real name read backwards in Japanese.

== Biography ==
Koyama was born in 1964 in Hondo (now part of Amakusa), Kumamoto, Japan. His father, Kiyotsugu, worked in finance, while his mother, Takako, owned a beauty parlor. He has a brother named Shōdō (将堂) three years younger than him who has Down syndrome; Koyama says their parents strove to raise them equally. As a child Koyama considered becoming a poet, but did not follow through.

As a broadcasting student at the Nihon University College of Art, he began working under Yasuji Hayashi of Nippon Cultural Broadcasting. Hayashi, who found him an "interesting character", asked Koyama to begin writing scripts for broadcast. In Koyama's third year he branched out into television screenwriting, making his debut with the late-night show 11pm. Continuing this screenwriting after graduation, Koyama began getting attention for his work on Fuji Television's Kanossa no Kutsujoku (1990–1991), a late-night show which "took various modern-day social phenomena and products and explained them satirically by presenting them as historical events and folklore".

Koyama later wrote Nippon Television's Susume Denpa Shonen, and Fuji's Iron Chef. In 2003 he wrote an International Emmy Award-nominated series, The Perfect Manual.

In 2008 Shochiku hired Koyama to adapt Aoki Shinmon's autobiographical Coffinman: The Journal of a Buddhist Mortician (納棺夫日記, Nōkanfu Nikki); this was Koyama's first venture in the feature film industry. Koyama dropped many of the book's religious themes, changing them with more humanistic ones, and integrated a subplot from a novel he was writing. For the title he coined the term okuribito, a euphemism for morticians derived from the words okuru ("to send off") and hito ("person"). The final film, Departures, was submitted to the 81st Academy Awards for the Best Foreign Language Film and won, the first Japanese win since the category opened to multiple entrants in 1956. For his writing, Koyama received numerous accolades, including a Kinema Junpo Award, Yomiuri Prize, and Japan Academy Prize. By December 2009 the film had won 98 awards.

Koyama began heading the Project Design department of the Tohoku University of Art and Design when that program was established in 2009. The program teaches students how to plan productions. Later that year he was one of the writers of Hutch the Honeybee, a film adaptation of the anime The Adventures of Hutch the Honeybee (1970–71). He also wrote the 2009 live action film Snow Prince. In 2012 Koyama was named representative director and president of the restaurant Shimogamo Saryo in Kyoto Prefecture. In 2013 Koyama was company director of Amakusa Airlines, based out of his hometown. When tasked with promoting Kumamoto Prefecture, he had art director Manabu Mizuno design the bear-shaped mascot Kumamon; it generated $1.2 billion in income for the prefecture in two years.

Koyama's writing includes various articles for newspapers and magazines. He has released several novels, including Film (フィルム) and Awaiting (まってる). He is the representative of N35 Inc., a literary agency specializing in broadcast screenplay writers, and he is president and CEO of the marketing firm Orange and Partners.

== Works cited ==
- "ジャニーズJr.森本慎太郎"初体験"に「心臓バクバク」". eiga.com (in Japanese). 12 December 2009. Archived from the original on 29 July 2014.
- Akiyama, Noriko (14 July 2013). "Popular broadcast writer Koyama believes new ideas spring from kindness". Asahi Shimbun. Archived from the original on 12 June 2014.
- Armstrong, Derek. "Departures (review)". Allmovie. Rovi. Archived from the original on 23 May 2014.
- "Company" (in Japanese). Orange and Partners. Archived from the original on 26 July 2014.
- "Kumamon, Japan's new superstar". The Hindu. 25 February 2014.
- "Kundo Koyama" (in Japanese). N35 Inc. Archived from the original on 8 August 2014.
- "Kundo Koyama". Asia Pacific Screen Awards. Archived from the original on 23 July 2014.
- Morozumi, Masako (March 2003). "障害乳幼児をもつ親への子育て支援 ― きょうだいの問題について ―" [A support and education for parents of children with disabilities: On problems of siblings of children with disabilities] (PDF). Ritsumeikan Ningen Kagaku Kenkyū (5). Ritsumeikan University: 225–236.
- Nippon Academy-shō Association staff. "第32回日本アカデミー賞優秀作品" [32nd Japan Academy Prize] (in Japanese). Nippon Academy-shō Association. Archived from the original on 14 July 2014.
- Okuyama, Yoshiko (April 2013). "Shinto and Buddhist Metaphors in Departures". Journal of Religion and Film. 17 (1, art. 39). ISSN 1092-1311. Archived from the original on 13 September 2015.
- Schilling, Mark (11 January 2009). "Yojiro Takita pic tops Kinema Junpo Awards". Variety. Archived from the original on 12 August 2014.
- Schilling, Mark (11 December 2009). "A decade when Japan's cinema stood up to Hollywood menace". The Japan Times. Archived from the original on 14 July 2014.
- Tanabe, Hideyuki (2 March 2009). 第８１回米アカデミー賞 外国語映画受賞 「おくりびと」 [81st American Academy Awards Foreign-Language Film Winner Okuribito]. Mainichi Shimbun (in Japanese). p. 9.
- "The Adventures of Hutch the Honeybee Anime to Get Film (Updated)". Anime News Network. 27 December 2009. Archived from the original on 23 August 2014.
- Yomiuri staff. "読売文学賞 第５１回（平成１１年度）～第６０回（平成２０年度）" [51st–60th Yomiuri Prize (1999–2008)]. Yomiuri Shimbun (in Japanese). Archived from the original on 5 May 2015.
- Yoshida, Narihiko (2010). アイデアをカタチにする仕事術: ビジネス・プロデューサーの７つの能力 [Giving Shape to an Idea: Seven Skills of Business Producers] (in Japanese). Toyo Keizai. ISBN 978-4-492-04367-7.
