= Kabei: Our Mother =

- Film poster
- Directed by: Yoji Yamada
- Written by: Teruyo Nogami (biography); Yoji Yamada & Emiko Hiramatsu (screenplay)
- Produced by: Hiroshi Fukazawa; Takashi Yajima
- Starring: Sayuri Yoshinaga; Tadanobu Asano; Rei Dan; Mirai Shida
- Cinematography: Mutsuo Naganuma
- Edited by: Iwao Ishii
- Music by: Isao Tomita
- Production companies: Asahi Broadcasting Corporation; Eisei Gekijo; Hakuhodo DY Media Partners; Sumitomo Corporation; TV Asahi; Yahoo Japan; Yomiuri Shimbun Company; Tokyo FM
- Distributed by: Shochiku (Japan); Strand Releasing (United States)
- Release date: January 26, 2008 (Japan)
- Running time: 132 minutes
- Country: Japan
- Language: Japanese
- Box office: $18,385,964

Kabei: Our Mother (Japanese: 母べえ, Hepburn: Kābē) is a 2008 Japanese drama film starring Sayuri Yoshinaga and directed by Yoji Yamada.

The film was based on the autobiographical novel by Teruyo Nogami, who for many years worked with director Akira Kurosawa, often as script supervisor.

== Plot ==
Set in Tokyo in 1940, the peaceful life of the Nogami family suddenly changes when the father, Shigeru, is arrested and accused of being a Communist. His wife Kayo works frantically from morning to night to maintain the household and bring up her two daughters with the support of Shigeru's sister Hisako and Shigeru's former student Yamazaki, but her husband does not return. World War II breaks out and casts dark shadows on the entire country, but Kayo still tries to keep her cheerful determination, and sustain the family with her love. This is an emotional drama of a mother and an eternal message for peace.

== Cast ==
- Sayuri Yoshinaga as Kayo Nogami
- Tadanobu Asano as Yamazaki Toru
- Rei Dan as Hisako Nogami
- Mirai Shida as Hatsuko Nogami
- Miku Satō as Teruyo Nogami
- Umenosuke Nakamura as Kyūtarō Fujioka
- Takashi Sasano
- Denden
- Bandō Mitsugorō X as Shigeru Nogami
- Mizuho Suzuki as Hajime Nikaido
- Chieko Baisho as Hatsuko Nogami (adult)
- Keiko Toda as Teruyo Nogami (adult)
- Yōji Matsuda as Shimazaki
- Michie Tomizawa
- Mayumi Tanaka
- Kumiko Nishihara
- Masuo Amada
- Daisuke Gōri
- Mii Takahashi as Ritsuko

== Reception ==
The film received several nominations at the 32nd Japan Academy Film Prize, including for Best Film, Best Director, Best Actress for Sayuri Yoshinaga, Best Supporting Actor for Tadanobu Asano and Best Supporting Actress for Rei Dan.

== See also ==
- Japanese resistance during the Shōwa period
