= Time Adventure: Zeccho 5-byo Mae =

- Film poster
- Directed by: Yōjirō Takita
- Written by: Isao Takagi
- Produced by: Haruhisa Okino
- Starring: Kozue Tanaka
- Cinematography: Yoichi Shiga
- Music by: Kouichi Fujino
- Distributed by: Nikkatsu
- Release date: December 20, 1986
- Running time: 76 minutes
- Country: Japan
- Language: Japanese

Time Adventure: Zeccho 5-byo Mae (Japanese: タイム・アバンチュール 絶頂５秒前), known in English as Time Adventure: 5 Seconds Til Climax, is a 1986 Japanese pink film directed by Yōjirō Takita.

== Synopsis ==
A softcore sex film in Nikkatsu's Roman Porno series with comedy and science fiction themes. A sexy young woman travels 15 years into the future to 2001, where she engages in various sexual escapades.

== Cast ==
- Kozue Tanaka
- Yukijirō Hotaru
- Saeko Kizuki
- Yuji Nogami
- Kaori Sugita
- Shinobu Wakana
