= Rei Dan =

Japanese actress

- Born: Mayumi Yamazaki; August 4, 1971 (age 54); Hyogo Prefecture, Japan
- Occupation: Actress
- Years active: 1992–present
- Spouse: Mitsuhiro Oikawa (m. 2011; div. 2018)

Mayumi Yamazaki (山崎 まゆみ, Yamazaki Mayumi; born August 4, 1971), known professionally as Rei Dan (檀れい, Dan Rei), is a Japanese actress. She began her career as a member of the Takarazuka Revue. She was nominated for Best Supporting Actress at the 32nd Japan Academy Prize for Kabei: Our Mother.

== Filmography ==
=== Television ===
Year	Japanese Title	Title	Role	Network	Notes	Refs
2007	陽炎の辻	Kagerō no Tsuji Inemuri Iwane Edo Zōshi		NHK		
2008	あの戦争は何だったのか	Ano Senso wa Nan Datta no ka		TBS		
2009	そうか、もう君はいないのか	Soka, Mo Kimi wa Inai no ka	Inoue Noriko	TBS	TV movie	
2010	八日目の蝉	Rebirth	Kiwako Nonomiya	NHK	Lead role	
2011	美しい隣人	Utsukushii Rinjin	Yano Eriko	Fuji TV		
2011	犬の消えた日	Inu no Kieta Hi		NTV		
2011	造花の蜜	Zouka no Mitsu	Ran	Wowow	Lead role	
2012	平清盛	Taira no Kiyomori	Fujiwara no Tamako/Taikenmon'in	NHK	Taiga drama	
2012	プラチナタウン	Platinum Town	Nakazato Erika	WOWOW		
2014	福家警部補の挨拶	Fukuie Keibuho no Aisatsu	Assistant Inspector Fukui	Fuji TV	Lead role	
2014	ルーズヴェルト・ゲーム	Roosevelt Game	Nakamoto Arisa	TBS		
2014	ヒガンバナ	Higanbana	Minegishi Yukino	NTV		
2016	沈まぬ太陽	Shizumanu Taiyō	Miki Mitsui	Wowow		
2020	麒麟がくる	Awaiting Kirin	Dota Gozen	NHK	Taiga drama	
2023		Vivant	Eiko Nishioka	TBS		
2024	マウンテンドクター	Mountain Doctor	Shuko Matsuzawa	Fuji TV		

=== Film ===
- Sun and Bolero (2022)
- Silent Parade (2022), Rumi Niikura
- The Dancing Okami (2024), Harumi Higuchi

=== Dubbing ===
- The Three Musketeers (2011), Milady de Winter (Milla Jovovich)
- Wish (2023), Queen Amaya
