= Itoshino Half Moon =

- Theatrical release poster
- Directed by: Yōjirō Takita
- Screenplay by: Hiroshi Saito
- Based on: Itoshi-no Half Moon by Mieko Harada
- Produced by: Yoshiyuki Kaino
- Starring: Maiko Itō
- Distributed by: Nikkatsu
- Release date: August 8, 1987 (Japan)
- Country: Japan
- Language: Japanese

Itoshino Half Moon (Japanese: 愛しの ハーフ ムーン), also stylized as Itoshi-no Half Moon, is a 1987 Japanese film directed by Yōjirō Takita, based on a novel of the same name by actress Mieko Harada. Screenwriter Hiroshi Saito won the "Best Screenplay" award at the Yokohama Film Festival for this film.

== Cast ==
- Maiko Itō: Yoko Sugino
- Ken Ishiguro: Osamu Yokoyama
- Shinobu Horie: Reiko Sugino
- Daisuke Shima: Hirokazu Ishida
- Yukijirō Hotaru: Man at 'Yu-chan'
- Yutaka Ikejima: Bar owner
- Midori Satsuki: Satoko Sugino
- Susumu Terajima: Hooligan
- Takashi Tsumura: Yusuke Taki
- Sakae Umezu: Yamahiko Sugino

== Bibliography ==
- "Variety Japan" 愛しのハーフ・ムーン (in Japanese). Variety Japan.
- 愛しのハーフ・ムーン (in Japanese). Japanese Movie Database.
- Itoshi-no half moon at IMDb
