= Shinmon Aoki =

Japanese writer and poet (1937–2022)

- Born: 11 April 1937; Nyūzen, Shimoniikawa District, Toyama, Toyama Prefecture, Japan
- Died: 6 August 2022 (aged 85)
- Occupations: Writer, poet
- Writing career
- Genre: Fiction

Shinmon Aoki (Japanese: 青木新門, Hepburn: Aoki Shinmon; 11 April 1937 – 6 August 2022) was a Japanese writer and poet. He was best known for his memoirs Coffinman: The Journal of a Buddhist Mortician, published in 1993. The book was based on his diaries during a period in which he worked as a mortician in the 1970s, a profession which is traditionally regarded as a taboo in Japan due to their perception of death. In 2008 his memoirs were adapted into a successful Academy Award-winning feature film, Departures, by filmmaker Yōjirō Takita.

Aoki died on 6 August 2022, at the age of 85.
