= Paco and the Magical Book =

- Film poster
- Kanji: パコと魔法の絵本
- Revised Hepburn: Pako to Mahō no Ehon
- Directed by: Tetsuya Nakashima
- Screenplay by: Nobuhiro Monma; Tetsuya Nakashima
- Story by: Hirohito Gotō
- Produced by: Yutaka Suzuki
- Starring: Kōji Yakusho; Ayaka Wilson; Satoshi Tsumabuki
- Cinematography: Shoichi Ato; Atsushi Ozawa
- Edited by: Yoshiyuki Koike
- Music by: Gabriele Roberto
- Production companies: Cine Bazar; TV Tokyo; Hakuhodo DY Media Partners; DesperaDo; Parco; Horipro; Gentosha; Amuse Soft; Licri; TV Osaka; Columbia Music Entertainment; TV Aichi; Television Hokkaido; TVQ Kyushu Broadcasting; TV Setouchi
- Distributed by: Toho
- Release date: 13 September 2008 (Japan)
- Running time: 105 minutes
- Country: Japan
- Language: Japanese
- Box office: $22,679,633

Paco and the Magical Book (Japanese: パコと魔法の絵本, Hepburn: Pako to Mahō no Ehon; lit. Paco and the Magical Picture Book) is a 2008 Japanese children's film written and directed by Tetsuya Nakashima, based on a play by Hirohito Gotō.

It was shown at the Munich Asian Filmfest in 2008 and has been nominated for three awards for the 2009 Asian Film Awards. Actors Kōji Yakusho and Ayaka Wilson and director Tetsuya Nakashima have been nominated for the 2008 Japanese Academy Award.

== Synopsis ==
The movie is set in a hospital where "strange" people are sent.

One of the older, gruffer patients, is Onuki, a business owner who is sent to the hospital after a heart attack, thinks little of the other hospital patients, and hopes to die without being remembered by such "worthless" people. Another patient, a young girl named Paco, is in the hospital due to a memory disorder- she can only remember the events of one day at a time. Each day she reads a pop-up children's book, and often asks Onuki to read to her. Each day it is a new story for her.

Eventually, the two of them develop a friendship, and Onuki decides to enlist the help of the other people in the hospital to perform a play of the book, hoping it will help Paco.

== Cast ==
- Ōnuki (Prince Gama): Kōji Yakusho
- Paco: Ayaka Wilson
- Muromachi (the demon crawfish): Satoshi Tsumabuki
- Tamako (the ricefish): Anna Tsuchiya
- Horigome (the dragonfly larva): Sadao Abe
- Kōichi (the water strider): Ryō Kase
- Masami (the swamp shrimp witch): Eiko Koike
- Ryūmonji (the whirligig beetle): Takaya Yamauchi
- Kinomoto (Queen Gama): Jun Kunimura
- Takita (the fish): Gekidan Hitori
- Asano (the pond snail): Takaya Kamikawa
