= Masahiro Motoki =

Japanese actor (born 1965)

- Born: Masahiro Motoki (本木雅弘); 21 December 1965 (age 60); Okegawa, Saitama, Japan
- Years active: 1981–present
- Spouse: Yayako Uchida (m. 1995)
- Children: 3
- Awards: Asian Film Award for Best Actor; 2009 Departures; Japanese Academy Award for Best Newcomer; 1990 226; Japanese Academy Award for Best Actor; 1993 Sumo Do, Sumo Don't; 2009 Departures; Blue Ribbon Award for Best Actor; 1993 Sumo Do, Sumo Don't; 2009 Departures; Hochi Film Award for Best Actor; 1992 Sumo Do, Sumo Don't; Japanese Professional Movie Award for Best Actor; 1992 Bang! Kinema Junpo Award for Best Actor; 2009 Departures; Mainichi Film Concours for Best Actor; 1999 The Bird People in China; Nikkan Sports Film Award for Best Actor; 1999 The Bird People in China; Tokyo International Film Festival (Best Actor); 1993 Last Song; Yokohama Film Festival (Best Actor); 1993 Sumo Do, Sumo Don't

Masahiro Motoki (本木 雅弘 Motoki Masahiro, born December 21, 1965) is a Japanese actor. He portrayed protagonist Daigo Kobayashi in Departures, which won the 81st Academy Awards for Best Foreign Language Film. His performance earned him the Award for Best Actor at the 2009 Asia Pacific Screen Awards, at the 3rd Asian Film Awards and at the 32nd Japan Academy Prize.

== Career ==
Motoki started his entertainment career as a member of boy band Shibugakitai (シブがき隊) (the name of the band contains a portmanteau of tough (渋い, Shibui) and kids (ガキ, gaki), a homonym of astringent persimmon (渋柿, Shibugaki)). The band made its debut in 1982 under the management of Johnny & Associates and was popular for a good part of the 1980s.

After the band broke up Motoki turned to acting. His first main role in a film was as a Zen monk in the comedy Fancy Dance (ファンシイダンス, Fanshii Dansu) directed by Masayuki Suo. Motoki also starred in Suo's next film, Sumo Do, Sumo Don't (シコふんじゃった。, Shiko Funjatta.), which practically introduced him to audiences outside Japan. He then worked with directors such as Takashi Miike (The Bird People in China (中国の鳥人, Chūgoku no Chōjin)) and Shinya Tsukamoto (Gemini (双生児, Sōseiji)).

Motoki's breakthrough to international fame came with the 2008 film Departures (おくりびと, Okuribito) directed by Yōjirō Takita, in which he plays a cellist turned mortician. The film received the Best Foreign Language Film award at the 81st Academy Awards, as well as six acting awards for Motoki. The film project started from an idea of Motoki's after he read a book written by a professional mortician.

== Family ==
He married essayist and musician Yayako Uchida, the daughter of actress Kirin Kiki and rock'n roll singer Yuya Uchida, in 1995. As a mukoyōshi, he took his wife's surname, which is thus his legal surname. The couple have three children.

== Filmography ==
=== Film ===
Year	Title	Role	Notes	Ref.
1989	Fancy Dance	Yōhei Shiono	Lead role	
1989	Four Days of Snow and Blood	Hisashi Kōno		
1992	Sumo Do, Sumo Don't	Shuhei Yamamoto	Lead role	
1994	Rampo	Kogoro Akechi	Lead role	
1995	Gonin	Junichi Mitsuya		
1996	Tokiwa: The Manga Apartment	Hiroo Terada	Lead role	
1996	Shall We Dance?	Hiromasa Kimoto		
1998	The Bird People in China	Wada	Lead role	
1999	Gemini	Yukio Daitokuji / Sutekichi	Lead role	
2003	Spy Sorge	Hotsumi Ozaki		
2006	Tekkonkinkreet	Snake (voice)		
2007	The Longest Night in Shanghai	Naoki Mizushima	Lead role; Chinese-Japanese film	
2008	Departures	Daigo Kobayashi	Lead role	
2015	The Big Bee	Kōichi Mishima		
2015	The Emperor in August	Emperor Hirohito		
2016	The Long Excuse	Sachio Kinugasa	Lead role	
2020	The Works and Days	NPC	USA/Sweden/Japan/UK film	
2024	Touch		British-Icelandic film	
2024	Silence of the Sea	Ryūji Tsuyama	Lead role	
2026	The Samurai and the Prisoner	Araki Murashige	Lead role	
2026	The Man Who Carried the Voices of Augustt	Tamotsu Tsujihara	Lead role	

=== Television ===
Year	Title	Role	Notes	Ref.
1981	Sempachi Sensei	Subaru Morita		
1991	Taiheiki	Chigusa Tadaaki	Taiga drama	
1998	Tokugawa Yoshinobu	Tokugawa Yoshinobu	Lead role; Taiga drama	
2009–11	Clouds Over the Hill	Akiyama Saneyuki	Lead role	
2012	Man of Destiny	Ryōta Yuminari	Lead role	
2019	Giri/Haji	Fukuhara	British television series	
2020	Awaiting Kirin	Saitō Dōsan	Taiga drama	
2021	Ryūkō Kanbō	Naoya Shiga	Lead role; television film	
2023	Friendship: Seiji Hirao and Shinya Yamanaka	Seiji Hirao	Lead role; television film	
2025	Asura	Takao Satomi		
2025	The Man Who Carried the Voices of August	Tamotsu Tsujihara	Lead role; television film	

Awards and achievements
Asian Film Awards
Preceded by Tony Leung Chiu-Wai for Lust, Caution	Best Actor; 2009 for Departures	Succeeded by Wang Xueqi for Bodyguards and Assassins
