= Hirohito Gotō =

Japanese director, playwright, and actor (born 1969)

- 後藤ひろひと
- Born: 23 February 1969 (age 57)
- Citizenship: Japan
- Education: Osaka University of Foreign Studies (incomplete)
- Occupations: Playwright, Actor, Director
- Writing career
- Period: 1987 to present
- Notable works: Ningen Fūsha, Moldman the Bellringer in Dublin

Hirohito Gotō (後藤 ひろひと, Gotō Hirohito; born February 23, 1969) is a Japanese director, playwright, and actor. Born in Yamagata prefecture, he graduated from Yamagata Prefectural Yamagata East High School and dropped out of Hindi studies from Osaka University of Foreign Studies.

In 1987 he joined the theater group Yūkisha. By 1989 he served as the second head of the group and handled nearly all productions. After retiring from Yūkisha in 1996, he worked as a free playwright, and in 1998 created Piper with Kawashita Taiyō of former Gekidan Sotoba Komachi fame. In 2001 he began the Royal Theater.

His plays have a reputation for having a unique view of the world as well as for stories of a massive scale. Primary works include Ningen Fūsha (人間風車), Moldman the Bellringer in Dublin (ダブリンの鐘つきカビ人間), and the Big / Bigger / Biggest Biz trilogy.

== Filmography ==
=== Film ===
- Bolt (2020)

=== Television ===
- Hatsunetsu! Enjin Show (2003)
- Hyakuman Bariki Project Q (2004)

=== Stage ===
- Tomarenai 12nin (1998, 2003)
- Ningen Fūsha (2000)
- Big Biz: Miyahara Kimura Kiki Ippatsu! (2001, 2002)
- Kasō Tekikoku (2005)
- Moldman the Bellringer in Dublin (2002, 2005)
- Shuffle (2005)
- Bigger Biz: Zettai Zetsumei! Yūki Shisu? (2003, 2005)
- Midsummer Carol: Gama Ōji vs Zarigani Majin (2004)
- Hime ga Aishita Dani Kozō (2005)
- Biggest Biz: Saigo no Kessen! Hadosongawa o koero (2006)
- Our House (2006)
- Minna Mukashi wa rī datta: Exit from the Dragon (2006)
