= Comic Magazine =

1986 film by Yōjirō Takita

- Film poster

Japanese name
- Kanji: コミック雑誌なんかいらない!
Transcriptions
- Revised Hepburn: Komikku zasshi nanka iranai!, No More Comic Magazines!
- Directed by: Yōjirō Takita
- Starring: Yuya Uchida
- Release dates: August 23, 1986 (Japan); January 16, 1987 (USA)
- Country: Japan
- Language: Japanese

Comic Magazine (Japanese: コミック雑誌なんかいらない!, Hepburn: Komikku zasshi nanka iranai!), a.k.a. No More Comics!, is a 1986 Japanese film directed by Yōjirō Takita.

== Awards and nominations ==
11th Hochi Film Award

- Won: Best Film
- Won: Best Actor - Yuya Uchida
