= Yoshiko Okuyama =

Japanese studies professor

Yoshiko Okuyama is a Japanese studies professor at the University of Hawaiʻi at Hilo, whose research focuses on mythology, folklore, and religion, along with the connection of Japanese creative works and their representations of disability and mental health.

== Education ==
Okuyama attended the University of Arizona and obtained a Master's degree in English as a second language (ESL) and a Ph.D. in second language acquisition.

== Career ==
Hired by the University of Hawaiʻi at Hilo in 2001 as an assistant professor in the Japanese Studies department, Okuyama started her research focused around Oral Proficiency Interview methods. In 2020, she published a monograph titled Reframing Disability in Manga, which focused on how people with disabilities have been portrayed in manga from the 1990s and 2000s. The work used an expanded definition of disability, including those that are blind, deaf, autistic, or having issues of gender dysphoria. She began working on the publication in 2015 and it discusses fifteen case studies of different manga that properly showcase the capabilities of disabled individuals and how this representation can affect the cultural public understanding of the conditions. Okuyama's work in this book helps the furthering of community involvement in crip archaeology, an approach to archaeology that applies disability studies to examine the past and make archaeological practice more accessible. Her work moves to be a work to promote difference and to show that archaeology can be accessible beyond academic writing.

For her work on researching her disabilities monograph, she was made a visiting scholar for Kokugakuin University in 2017 and attended a 2018 National Endowment for the Humanities conference on the subject of disability studies. She later created her own 2019 seminar at the annual Association for Asian Studies conference to confer with other scholars. After the publication of the book, she was invited by Cornell University's East Asia Program to explain the topic. She was also given a course at the University of Hawaiʻi at Hilo on the subject of gender and disability in manga that began in spring 2022. Her subsequent 2022 book, Tōjisha Manga: Japan's Graphic Memoirs of Brain and Mental Health, discussed the history of Japan and its minority rights movements (tōjisha undō) and how graphic manga covered this history and the impacts of depression and obsessive-compulsive disorder (OCD) from the events.

== Awards ==
Okuyama was given the 2002 Francis Davis Award For Excellence in Undergraduate Teaching for her teaching work in Japanese language classes and her ability to convey difficult concepts to students.

== Bibliography ==
- — (2015). Japanese Mythology in Film: A Semiotic Approach to Reading Japanese Film and Anime. Lexington Books. p. 244. ISBN 9780739190937.
- — (2020). Reframing Disability in Manga. University of Hawaii Press. p. 238. ISBN 9780824883225.
- — (2022). Tōjisha Manga: Japan's Graphic Memoirs of Brain and Mental Health. Springer International Publishing. p. 295. ISBN 9783031008405.
