= Japan Academy Film Prize for Screenplay of the Year =

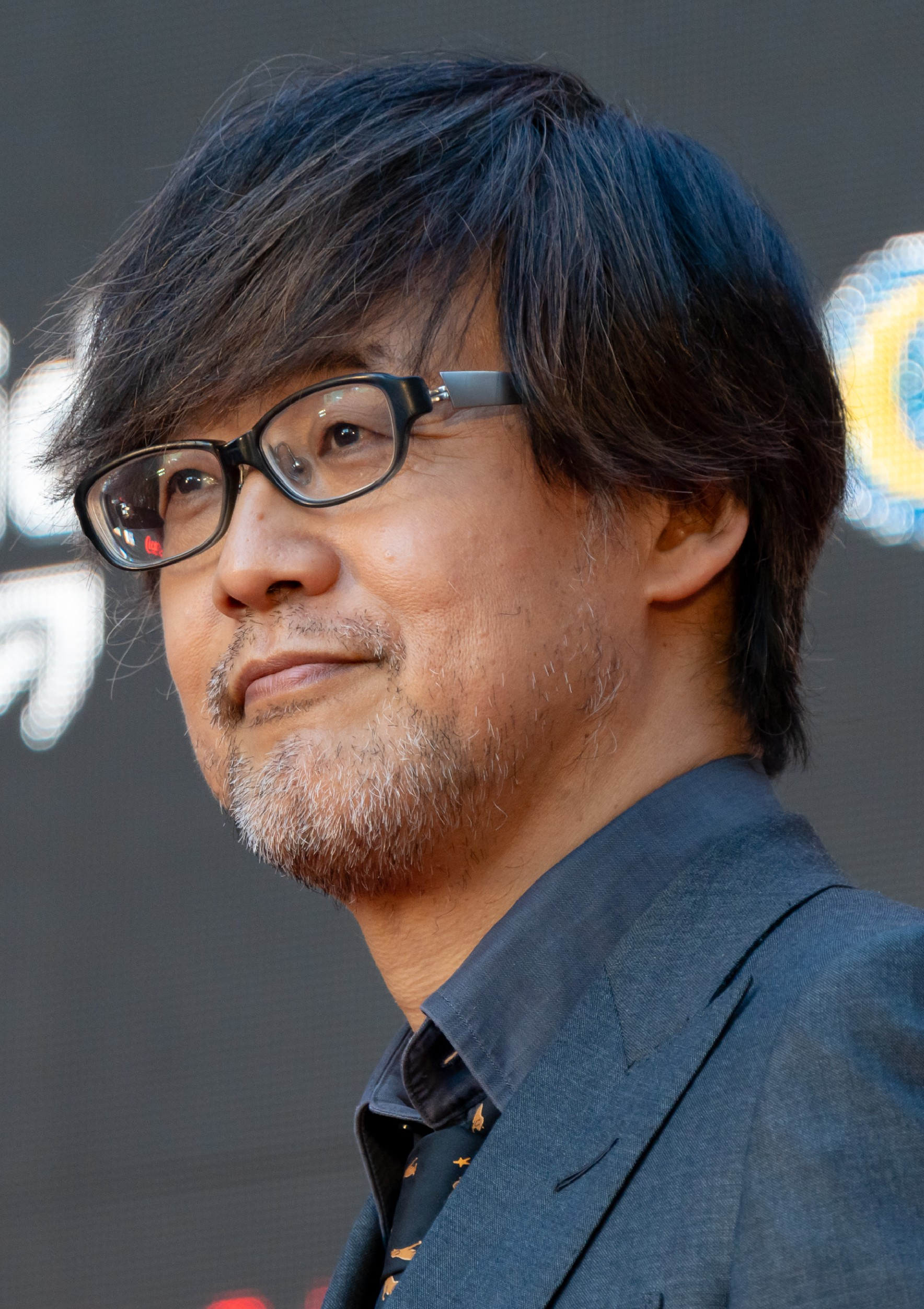
- The 2024 recipient: Takashi Yamazaki
- Awarded for: Excellence in screenwriting
- Country: Japan
- Presented by: Japan Academy Film Prize Association
- First award: 1978
- Website: http://www.japan-academy-prize.jp/

The Screenplay of the Year (最優秀脚本賞) of the Japan Academy Film Prize is one of the annual Awards given by the Japan Academy Film Prize Association.

== List of winners ==
Nr.	Year	Screenwriter (English)	Screenwriter (Japanese)	Film (English)
1	1978	Yoji Yamada	山田洋次	Otoko wa Tsurai yo The Yellow Handkerchief
2	1979	Kaneto Shindo	新藤兼人	The Incident
3	1980	Masaru Baba	馬場当	Vengeance Is Mine
4	1981	Yoshitaka Asama; Yoji Yamada	朝間義隆 山田洋次	A Distant Cry From Spring; Otoko wa Tsurai yo: Tora-san's Tropical Fever
5	1982	Sō Kuramoto	倉本聰	Station
6	1983	Kōhei Tsuka	つかこうへい	Fall Guy
7	1984	Kōji Takada	高田宏治	Yōkirō
8	1985	Juzo Itami	伊丹十三	The Funeral
9	1986	Hirō Matsuda	松田寛夫	Gray Sunset
10	1987	Fumio Konami; Kinji Fukasaku	神波史男 深作欣二	House on Fire
11	1988	Juzo Itami	伊丹十三	A Taxing Woman
12	1989	Shinichi Ichikawa	市川森一	The Discarnates
13	1990	Toshirō Ishido; Shōhei Imamura	石堂淑朗 今村昌平	Black Rain
14	1991	Taichi Yamada	山田太一	Childhood Days
15	1992	Kihachi Okamoto	岡本喜八	Rainbow Kids
16	1993	Masayuki Suo	周防正行	Sumo Do, Sumo Don't
17	1994	Yoji Yamada; Yoshitaka Asama	山田洋次 朝間義隆	A Class to Remember; Otoko wa Tsurai yo: Tora-san Makes Excuses
18	1995	Motomu Furuta; Kinji Fukasaku	古田求 深作欣二	Crest of Betrayal
19	1996	Kaneto Shindo	新藤兼人	A Last Note
20	1997	Masayuki Suo	周防正行	Shall We Dance?
21	1998	Kōki Mitani	宮崎駿	Welcome Back, Mr. McDonald
22	1999	Wui Sin Chong	鄭義信	Begging for Love
23	2000	Yoshiki Iwama; Yasuo Furuhata	岩間芳樹 降旗康男	Poppoya
24	2001	Akira Kurosawa	黒澤明	After the Rain
25	2002	Kankurō Kudō	宮藤官九郎	Go
26	2003	Yoji Yamada; Yoshitaka Asama	山田洋次 朝間義隆	The Twilight Samurai
27	2004	Tomomi Tsutsui	筒井ともみ	Like Asura
28	2005	Shinobu Yaguchi	矢口史靖	Swing Girls
29	2006	Takashi Yamazaki; Ryōta Kosawa	山崎貴 古沢良太	Always Sanchōme no Yūhi
30	2007	Sang-il Lee; Daisuke Habara	李相日 羽原大介	Hula Girls
31	2008	Suzuki Matsuo	松尾スズキ	Tokyo Tower: Mom and Me, and Sometimes Dad
32	2009	Kundō Koyama	小山薫堂	Departures
33	2010	Miwa Nishikawa	西川美和	Dear Doctor
34	2011	Tetsuya Nakashima	中島哲也	Confessions
35	2012	Satoko Okudera	奥寺佐渡子	Rebirth
36	2013	Kenji Uchida	内田けんじ	Key of Life
37	2014	Kensaku Watanabe	渡辺謙作	The Great Passage
38	2015	Akihiro Dobashi	土橋章宏	Samurai Hustle
39	2016	Shin Adachi	足立紳	100 Yen Love
40	2017	Makoto Shinkai	新海誠	Your Name
41	2018	Hirokazu Kore-eda	是枝裕和	The Third Murder
42	2019	Hirokazu Kore-eda	是枝裕和	Shoplifters
43	2020	Yūichi Tokunaga	徳永友一	Fly Me to the Saitama
44	2021	Akiko Nogi	野木亜紀子	The Voice of Sin
45	2022	Ryusuke Hamaguchi; Takamasa Oe	濱口竜介 大江崇允	Drive My Car
46	2023	Kōsuke Mukai	向井康介	A Man
47	2024	Takashi Yamazaki	山崎貴	Godzilla Minus One
48	2025	Akiko Nogi	野木亜紀子	Last Mile
49	2026	Satoko Okudera	奥寺佐渡子	Kokuho
