= Kokuho (film) =

2025 film by Lee Sang-il

- Theatrical release poster
- Japanese: 国宝
- Directed by: Sang-il Lee
- Written by: Satoko Okudera
- Based on: Kokuho by Shuichi Yoshida
- Produced by: Chieko Murata; Shinzo Matsuhashi
- Starring: Ryo Yoshizawa; Ryusei Yokohama; Mitsuki Takahata; Shinobu Terajima; Min Tanaka; Ken Watanabe
- Cinematography: Sofian El Fani
- Edited by: Tsuyoshi Imai
- Music by: Marihiko Hara
- Production companies: Myriagon Studio; Credeus
- Distributed by: Toho
- Release dates: 18 May 2025 (Cannes); 6 June 2025 (Japan)
- Running time: 175 minutes
- Country: Japan
- Language: Japanese
- Budget: ¥1.2 billion (US$8 million)
- Box office: $134 million

Kokuho (国宝, Kokuhō; lit. 'National Treasure') is a 2025 Japanese historical drama film directed by Sang-il Lee and written by Satoko Okudera, based on the 2018 novel Kokuho by Shuichi Yoshida. It stars Ryo Yoshizawa, Ryusei Yokohama, Mitsuki Takahata, Shinobu Terajima, Min Tanaka, and Ken Watanabe.

Kokuho premiered in the Directors' Fortnight section of the 78th Cannes Film Festival on 18 May 2025, and was theatrically released in Japan on 6 June, by Toho. It received positive reviews, particularly for the acting, directing, cinematography and makeup and hairstyling. It grossed $128 million in Japan, becoming the all-time highest-grossing Japanese live-action film in terms of yen. It was selected as the Japanese entry for Best International Feature Film, making the December shortlist, and was nominated for Best Makeup and Hairstyling at the 98th Academy Awards.

== Plot ==
In 1964, renowned kabuki actor Hanai Hanjiro II visits yakuza group Tachibana in Nagasaki for a New Year gathering. Kikuo Tachibana performs as onnagata an excerpt of the kabuki performance Barrier Gate. A rival yakuza group attacks after the performance, killing Kikuo's father. Kikuo plots revenge, but fails.

A year later, Kikuo is taken on as an apprentice by Hanjiro despite his background. Kikuo is given the stage name Toichiro and begins training alongside Shunsuke (stage name Han'ya), Hanjiro's son and heir to the Tanba-ya house of kabuki. The two form a brotherly bond. Hanjiro takes them to Kyoto to see a performance of Heron Maiden by Mangiku, an onnagata kabuki actor who is a kokuho (Living National Treasure). The performance inspires both Kikuo and Shunsuke. Kikuo meets geisha Fujikoma in Kyoto who offers to be his mistress, and they later have a daughter Ayano.

Kikuo and Shunsuke pair up as an onnagata duo "To-Han" with a performance of Wisteria Maiden. When Hanjiro is injured in a traffic accident and unable to perform at the Osaka Shochikuza Theatre, he gives the role of Ohatsu in The Love Suicides at Sonezaki to Kikuo, causing an upset Shunsuke to run away.

Hanjiro wishes for Kikuo to inherit the title of Hanai Hanjiro III. During the ceremony, Hanjiro vomits blood and calls out for Shunsuke before he dies. Kikuo loses support in the kabuki house and is relegated to supporting roles. Shunsuke returns to a starring role with Mangiku. Kikuo's yazuka past and the illegitimate daughter he sired with Fujikoma further tarnish his reputation. Kikuo begins a sexual relationship with Akiko, daughter of a prominent kabuki investor, and her father beats Kikuo in front of a kabuki performance. Kikuo is forced out of Tanba-ya and kabuki.

Four years later, Kikuo and Akiko are making a living by performing at banquets and small establishments. Mangiku, now 93 and retired, offers Kikuo a chance to return to kabuki. Kikuo teams up again with Shunsuke as the "Han-Han" duo to great success. While climbing a ladder during a performance of Ninin Dojoji, Shunsuke collapses on set, and later has to have his left leg amputated below the knee due to diabetes complications. Shunsuke expresses his desire to perform as Ohatsu in The Love Suicides at Sonezaki before it is too late. While the performance is a success, Shunsuke is close to death.

Sixteen years later in 2014, the late Shunsuke has been posthumously granted the title of Hanai Byakko V, while Kikuo is named a kokuho. During an interview, Kikuo is asked what he is further seeking, to which he replies that he is looking for a particular "scenery", the same answer he gave after his performance of Ninin Dojoji years before. The interview photographer reveals herself to be the estranged Ayano, who cannot help but be drawn in by his performances. Kikuo performs Heron Maiden in Shunsuke's honor.

== Cast ==
- Ryo Yoshizawa as Kikuo Tachibana / Hanai Toichiro / Hanai Hanjiro III
  - Sōya Kurokawa as young Kikuo
- Ryusei Yokohama as Shunsuke Ōgaki / Hanai Han'ya
  - Keitatsu Koshiyama as young Shunsuke
- Mitsuki Takahata as Harue Fukuda
- Shinobu Terajima as Sachiko Ōgaki, Shunsuke's mother
- Nana Mori as Akiko
- Ai Mikami as Fujikoma, a geisha
- Kumi Takiuchi as Ayano, Kikuo and Fujikoma's daughter
- Masatoshi Nagase as Gongorō Tachibana, Kikuo's father
- Emma Miyazawa as Matsu Tachibana, Kikuo's foster mother
- Takahiro Miura as Takeno
- Kyusaku Shimada as Umeki
- Tateto Serizawa as Genkichi
- Nakamura Ganjirō IV as Akiko's father
- Min Tanaka as Onogawa Mangiku, a Living National Treasure
- Ken Watanabe as Hanai Hanjiro II, Shunsuke's father

== Production ==
The original novel exceeded 800 pages, and the initial cut ran for four and a half hours. Director Lee reflected that the process of cutting it down to three hours was extremely difficult. Ryo Yoshizawa, the lead actor, trained for a year and a half under kabuki actor Nakamura Ganjirō IV alongside Ryusei Yokohama. Yoshizawa regarded this film as the culmination of his career. After seeing the completed movie, Watanabe said he believed it would become Yoshizawa's "signature work".

Yoshizawa and Yokohama devoted a year and a half to rehearsals, including kabuki dance and movements, and spent three months filming. In an interview after filming, Yoshizawa said, "Practicing for a year and a half, I realized more and more that I couldn't keep up the pace the more I did. Compared to everyone who has been performing on stage since childhood, of course, a year and a half isn't enough to master it all, but I think what was necessary for this film was the spirit of clinging to kabuki despite understanding that. That perseverance was what I felt was needed." Yokohama commented, "I didn't know much about the world of kabuki myself. If I had known more, I might have been overwhelmed with unnecessary information, so maybe my desire to learn more came from not knowing. While respecting the customs and traditions, I also lived as a kabuki actor, and I think I was able to throw myself into it wholeheartedly.".

When asked about a scene that left a strong impression, Yoshizawa replied, "It might not be the same as 'touching the heart', but there is a scene where I dance wildly on a rooftop of a building. Out of about three takes, what I was doing was all over the place and mostly improvised. The one used was the last take, and the director told me to look at Nanao Mori's face. When I looked at her suddenly, she asked, 'Where are you looking?' That line naturally came out of me, thinking, 'Where am I looking?' It was a moment where, through my own filter, I wondered, 'Where is Kikuo looking?' and I couldn't quite tell. I remember everything about the filming of that scene vividly, including that honest line.".

Regarding a scene or line that left an impression, Yokohama responded, "The line Shunsuke says, 'I want to become a true actor,' really struck me... Shunsuke and I are complete opposites, but that one desire was something I could resonate with and empathize with."

== Release ==
Kokuho premiered in the Directors' Fortnight section of the 2025 Cannes Film Festival on May 18, 2025, and was theatrically released in Japan by Toho on June 6. It was presented in the Gala Presentation at the 30th Busan International Film Festival in September 2025.

== Reception ==
=== Critical reception ===
On the review aggregator website Rotten Tomatoes, 95% of 58 critics' reviews are positive, with an average rating of 8.1/10. The website's consensus reads: "A visual knockout that patiently explores the price that artists pay for their craft, Kokuho's astonishing technical virtues are only rivaled by Ryô Yoshizawa and Ryûsei Yokohama's superb performances." Metacritic, which uses a weighted average, assigned the film a score of 80 out of 100, based on 10 critics, indicating "generally favorable" reviews. This movie scored an average of 6.83 out of 10 on Cine21.

=== Box office ===
Kokuho was released in Japan on June 6 and debuted in third place with a box office revenue of ¥346 million in its first three days, following Lilo & Stitch and Mission: Impossible – The Final Reckoning. It received high praise from audiences and moved up one spot in its second week, with cumulative box office revenue surpassing ¥1.1 billion. The film finally hit number one in its third week and held that spot for four consecutive weeks until Demon Slayer: Kimetsu no Yaiba – The Movie: Infinity Castle was released.

Toho announced on August 18 that Kokuho has become the fourth Japanese live-action film to surpass ¥10 billion at the box office. It's the first film to achieve this milestone in 22 years since Bayside Shakedown 2. Its strong performance at the box office continued, with the film breaking ¥15 billion mark on September 24. Not only that, but the original novel recorded ten consecutive weeks at the top of the sales charts. Furthermore, reports indicate that the number of people interested in Kabuki itself increased, with ticket sales rising by 20% compared to the previous year.

On November 25, it was announced that the box office revenue for this movie reached ¥17.37 billion, surpassing Bayside Shakedown 2 to become the highest-grossing live-action Japanese film of all time. On February 16, 2026, after an eight-month long run, its box office earnings reached the ¥20 billion milestone.

=== Accolades ===
Kokuho is the first Japanese-produced film to receive a nomination for Best Makeup and Hairstyling at the 98th Academy Awards.

Award	Category	Recipient(s)	Result	Ref.
2025 Vancouver International Film Festival	Audience Award, Galas & Special Presentations	Kokuho	Won	
Yahoo! Japan Search Awards	Movie Category	Kokuho	Won	
50th Hochi Film Awards	Best Film	Kokuho	Won	
50th Hochi Film Awards	Best Director	Sang-il Lee	Won	
50th Hochi Film Awards	Best Actor	Ryo Yoshizawa	Won	
50th Hochi Film Awards	BS10 Premium Award	Kokuho	Won	
47th Yokohama Film Festival	Best Film	Kokuho	Won	
47th Yokohama Film Festival	Best Director	Sang-il Lee	Won	
47th Yokohama Film Festival	Best Screenplay	Satoko Okudera	Won	
47th Yokohama Film Festival	Best Actor	Ryo Yoshizawa	Won	
47th Yokohama Film Festival	Best Supporting Actor	Min Tanaka	Won	
47th Yokohama Film Festival	Examiner Special Award	Nakamura Ganjirō IV	Won	
47th Yokohama Film Festival	Special Grand Prize	Yohei Taneda	Won	
38th Nikkan Sports Film Awards	Best Film	Kokuho	Won	
38th Nikkan Sports Film Awards	Best Director	Sang-il Lee	Won	
38th Nikkan Sports Film Awards	Best Actor	Ryo Yoshizawa	Won	
38th Nikkan Sports Film Awards	Best Supporting Actor	Min Tanaka	Won	
38th Nikkan Sports Film Awards	Best Supporting Actress	Kumi Takiuchi	Won	
38th Nikkan Sports Film Awards	Yūjirō Ishihara Newcomer Award	Sōya Kurokawa	Won	
80th Mainichi Film Awards	Best Film	Kokuho	Nominated	
80th Mainichi Film Awards	Best Director	Sang-il Lee	Won	
80th Mainichi Film Awards	Best Lead Performance	Ryo Yoshizawa	Won	
80th Mainichi Film Awards	Best Supporting Performance	Ryusei Yokohama	Nominated	
80th Mainichi Film Awards	Best Supporting Performance	Min Tanaka	Nominated	
80th Mainichi Film Awards	Best Newcomer	Sōya Kurokawa	Nominated	
80th Mainichi Film Awards	Best Screenplay	Satoko Okudera	Won	
80th Mainichi Film Awards	Best Cinematography	Sofian El Fani	Won	
80th Mainichi Film Awards	Best Art Direction	Yohei Taneda and Nao Shimoyama	Won	
80th Mainichi Film Awards	Best Music	Marihiko Hara	Won	
80th Mainichi Film Awards	Best Sound Recording	Mitsugu Shiratori	Won	
68th Blue Ribbon Awards	Best Film	Kokuho	Won	
68th Blue Ribbon Awards	Best Director	Sang-il Lee	Nominated	
68th Blue Ribbon Awards	Best Actor	Ryo Yoshizawa	Nominated	
68th Blue Ribbon Awards	Best Supporting Actor	Ryusei Yokohama	Nominated	
68th Blue Ribbon Awards	Best Supporting Actor	Ken Watanabe	Nominated	
68th Blue Ribbon Awards	Best Supporting Actor	Min Tanaka	Nominated	
68th Blue Ribbon Awards	Best Supporting Actress	Shinobu Terajima	Nominated	
68th Blue Ribbon Awards	Best Supporting Actress	Nana Mori	Nominated	
99th Kinema Junpo Awards	Best Director	Sang-il Lee	Won	
99th Kinema Junpo Awards	Best Screenplay	Satoko Okudera	Won	
99th Kinema Junpo Awards	Best Actor	Ryo Yoshizawa	Won	
46th Korean Association of Film Critics Awards	FIPRESCI Award (Foreign)	Sang-il Lee	Won	
49th Japan Academy Film Prize	Best Film	Kokuho	Won	
49th Japan Academy Film Prize	Best Director	Sang-il Lee	Won	
49th Japan Academy Film Prize	Best Actor	Ryo Yoshizawa	Won	
49th Japan Academy Film Prize	Best Supporting Actor	Ryusei Yokohama	Nominated	
49th Japan Academy Film Prize	Best Supporting Actor	Ken Watanabe	Nominated	
49th Japan Academy Film Prize	Best Supporting Actor	Min Tanaka	Nominated	
49th Japan Academy Film Prize	Best Supporting Actress	Mitsuki Takahata	Nominated	
49th Japan Academy Film Prize	Best Supporting Actress	Shinobu Terajima	Nominated	
49th Japan Academy Film Prize	Best Supporting Actress	Nana Mori	Nominated	
49th Japan Academy Film Prize	Best Screenplay	Satoko Okudera	Won	
49th Japan Academy Film Prize	Best Music	Marihiko Hara	Won	
49th Japan Academy Film Prize	Best Cinematography	Sofian El Fani	Won	
49th Japan Academy Film Prize	Best Lighting Direction	Yuki Nakamura	Won	
49th Japan Academy Film Prize	Best Art Direction	Yohei Taneda and Nao Shimoyama	Won	
49th Japan Academy Film Prize	Best Sound Recording	Mitsugu Shiratori	Won	
49th Japan Academy Film Prize	Best Film Editing	Tsuyoshi Imai	Won	
49th Japan Academy Film Prize	Newcomer of the Year	Ai Mikami	Won	
98th Academy Awards	Best Makeup and Hairstyling	Kyoko Toyokawa, Naomi Hibino and Tadashi Nishimatsu	Nominated	

== See also ==
- List of highest-grossing films in Japan
- List of submissions to the 98th Academy Awards for Best International Feature Film
- List of Japanese submissions for the Academy Award for Best International Feature Film
