= Japan Academy Film Prize for Outstanding Performance by an Actor in a Supporting Role =

Japan Academy Prize for Best Actor in a Supporting Role
- Awarded for: Best Performance by an Actor in a Supporting Role
- Country: Japan
- Presented by: Japan Academy Prize Association
- First award: 1978
- Currently held by: Jiro Sato; Suzuki=Bakudan (2025)
- Website: japan-academy-prize.jp

The Japan Academy Prize for Outstanding Performance by an Actor in a Supporting Role is an award presented annually by the Japan Academy Prize Association.

At the 1st Japan Academy Prize ceremony held in 1978, Tetsuya Takeda was the first winner of this award for his role in The Yellow Handkerchief. Since its inception, the award has been given to 36 actors. Naoto Takenaka has received the most awards in this category with three awards. As of the 2026 ceremony, Jiro Sato is the most recent winner in this category for his role as Tagosaku Suzuki in Suzuki=Bakudan.

== Winners ==
Year	Actor	Role(s)	Film	Ref.
1977 (1st)	Tetsuya Takeda	Kinya Hanada	The Yellow Handkerchief	
1978 (2nd)	Tsunehiko Watase	Sōkichi Takeshita	The Incident	
1979 (3rd)	Bunta Sugawara	Inspector Yamashita	The Man Who Stole the Sun	
1980 (4th)	Tetsurō Tamba	General Kodama	The Battle of Port Arthur (ja)	
1981 (5th)	Katsuo Nakamura	Tamawaki; Toshiharu Oda; Hikojiro; Kimura	Kagero-za; Love Letter (ja); Shikake-nin Baian; Buriki no kunsho	
1982 (6th)	Morio Kazama	Ginshiro	Fall Guy	
1983 (7th)	Morio Kazama	Hidetsugu of Niō; Miyagawa	The Geisha; Theater of Life	
1984 (8th)	Kaku Takashina	Deme Toku	Mahjong hōrōki	
1985 (9th)	Kaoru Kobayashi	Tetsushi Kamiya; Tsunejiro Hiraoka	Love Letter; Sorekara	
1986 (10th)	Hitoshi Ueki	Ichiro Harada; Kunio Sugimoto	Congratulatory Speech; Big Joys, Small Sorrows (ja)	
1987 (11th)	Masahiko Tsugawa	Hanamura; Noboru Mizoue	A Taxing Woman; Night Train	
1988 (12th)	Tsurutaro Kataoka	Hidekichi Harada; Gorō Tatsuno	The Discarnates; Yojo no Jidai	
1989 (13th)	Eiji Bandō	Senkichi Mizuta	Buddies (ja)	
1990 (14th)	Renji Ishibashi	Yukio Seki; Gonbei Horo; Akikawa	Kōen Dōri no Nekotachi (ja); Roningai; Ready to Shoot	
1991 (15th)	Masatoshi Nagase	Tetsuo Asano; Yōsuke Takizawa	My Sons; Mo no Shigoto	
1992 (16th)	Naoto Takenaka	Tomio Akio; Gay man in his 30s	Sumo Do, Sumo Don't; Original Sin	
1993 (17th)	Kunie Tanaka	Mr. Ino; Oshō; Mamoru Shohei	A Class to Remember (ja); Kozure Ōkami: Sono Chiisaki te ni Rainbow Bridge	
1994 (18th)	Kiichi Nakai	Matashirō Irobe	47 Ronin	
1995 (19th)	Naoto Takenaka	Tommy Tamejiro	East Meets West	
1996 (20th)	Naoto Takenaka	Tomio Aoki	Shall We Dance?	
1997 (21st)	Masahiko Nishimura	Tatsuhiko Ushijima	Welcome Back, Mr. McDonald	
1998 (22nd)	Chosuke Ikariya	Senior Inspector Heihachiro Waku	Bayside Shakedown	
1999 (23rd)	Nenji Kobayashi	Senji Sugiura	Poppoya	
2000 (24th)	Kōichi Satō	Hirotaka Utsuki	Whiteout	
2001 (25th)	Tsutomu Yamazaki	Hideyoshi	Go	
2002 (26th)	Min Tanaka	Zenemon Yogo	The Twilight Samurai	
2003 (27th)	Kōichi Satō	Saitō Hajime	When the Last Sword Is Drawn	
2004 (28th)	Joe Odagiri	Takeshi Park	Blood and Bones	
2005 (29th)	Shinichi Tsutsumi	Norifumi Suzuki	Always Sanchōme no Yūhi	
2006 (30th)	Takashi Sasano	Tokuhei	Love and Honor	
2007 (31st)	Kaoru Kobayashi	Oton	Tokyo Tower: Mom and Me, and Sometimes Dad	
2008 (32nd)	Tsutomu Yamazaki	Ikuei Sasaki	Departures	
2009 (33rd)	Teruyuki Kagawa	Chōjirō Uji	Mt. Tsurugidake	
2010 (34th)	Akira Emoto	Yoshio Ishibashi	Villain	
2011 (35th)	Denden	Yukio Murata	Cold Fish	
2012 (36th)	Hideji Ōtaki	Goro Ohura	Anata e	
2013 (37th)	Lily Franky	Yūdai Saiki	Like Father, Like Son	
2014 (38th)	Junichi Okada	Shōzaburō Dan'no	A Samurai Chronicle	
2015 (39th)	Masahiro Motoki	Emperor Hirohito	The Emperor in August	
2016 (40th)	Satoshi Tsumabuki	Yūma Fujita	Rage	
2017 (41st)	Kōji Yakusho	Misumi	The Third Murder	
2018 (42nd)	Tori Matsuzaka	Shūichi Hioka	The Blood of Wolves	
2019 (43rd)	Ryo Yoshizawa	Ying Zheng / Piao	Kingdom	
2020 (44th)	Ken Watanabe	Masao Yoshida	Fukushima 50	
2021 (45th)	Ryohei Suzuki	Shigehiro Uebayashi	Last of the Wolves	
2022 (46th)	Masataka Kubota	Daisuke Taniguchi	A Man	
2023 (47th)	Hayato Isomura	Sato-kun	The Moon	
2024 (48th)	Takao Osawa	Wang Qi	Kingdom 4: Return of the Great General	
2025 (49th)	Jiro Sato	Tagosaku Suzuki	Suzuki=Bakudan	

== Multiple wins ==
The following individuals received two or more Best Supporting Actor awards:

Wins	Actor
3	Naoto Takenaka
2	Morio Kazama
2	Kaoru Kobayashi
2	Kōichi Satō
2	Tsutomu Yamazaki
