= 49th Japan Academy Film Prize =

Japanese film awards in 2026

- Date: March 13, 2026
- Site: Grand Prince Hotel Shin Takanawa, Tokyo, Japan
- Hosted by: Shinichi Hatori; Yuumi Kawai

Highlights
- Most awards: Kokuho (10)
- Most nominations: Kokuho (17)

The 49th Japan Academy Film Prize (第49回日本アカデミー賞) is the 49th edition of the Japan Academy Film Prize, an award presented by the Nippon Academy-Sho Association to award excellence in filmmaking.

The nominations were announced on January 19, 2026.

== Winners and nominees ==
=== Awards ===
Best Film	Best Animation Film
Kokuho; Hero's Island; Suzuki=Bakudan; 1st Kiss; Tokyo Taxi	Demon Slayer: Kimetsu no Yaiba – The Movie: Infinity Castle; Chainsaw Man – The Movie: Reze Arc; 100 Meters; Peleliu: Guernica of Paradise; Detective Conan: One-eyed Flashback
Best Director	Best Screenplay
Lee Sang-il – Kokuho; Eiji Uchida – Night Flower; Keishi Ōtomo – Hero's Island; Ayuko Tsukahara – 1st Kiss; Akira Nagai – Suzuki=Bakudan	Satoko Okudera – Kokuho; Eiji Uchida – Night Flower; Kaho Fukuda – 366 Days; Masahiro Yamaura and Hiroyuki Yatsu – Suzuki=Bakudan; Yoji Yamada and Yuzo Asahara – Tokyo Taxi
Best Actor	Best Actress
Ryo Yoshizawa – Kokuho; Satoshi Tsumabuki – Hero's Island; Kyōzō Nagatsuka – Teki Cometh; Hokuto Matsumura – 5 Centimeters per Second; Yuki Yamada – Suzuki=Bakudan	Chieko Baisho – Tokyo Taxi; Keiko Kitagawa – Night Flower; Masami Nagasawa – Dollhouse; Suzu Hirose – A Pale View of Hills; Takako Matsu – 1st Kiss
Best Supporting Actor	Best Supporting Actress
Jiro Sato – Suzuki=Bakudan; Min Tanaka – Kokuho; Hokuto Matsumura – 1st Kiss; Ryusei Yokohama – Kokuho; Ken Watanabe – Kokuho	Misato Morita – Night Flower; Yū Aoi – Tokyo Taxi; Mitsuki Takahata – Kokuho; Shinobu Terajima – Kokuho; Nana Mori – Kokuho
Best Music	Best Cinematography
Marihiko Hara – Kokuho; Taisei Iwasaki – Tokyo Taxi; Naoki Satō – Hero's Island; Moe Hyuga – 366 Days; Yaffle – Suzuki=Bakudan	Sofian El Fani – Kokuho; Keisuke Imamura – 5 Centimeters per Second; Tetsuya Kondo – Suzuki=Bakudan; Daisuke Soma – Hero's Island; Masashi Chikamori – Tokyo Taxi
Best Lighting Direction	Best Art Direction
Yuki Nakamura – Kokuho; Koshiro Ueno – 5 Centimeters per Second; Satoshi Mizoguchi – Suzuki=Bakudan; Hidenori Nagata – Hero's Island; Masato Tsuchiyama – Tokyo Taxi	Yohei Taneda and Nao Shimoyama – Kokuho; Ryo Sugimoto and Takuya Okada – Suzuki=Bakudan; Takashi Nishimura – Tokyo Taxi; Hidefumi Hanatani – Hero's Island; Hiroto Matsuzaki – Muromachi Outsiders
Best Sound Recording	Best Film Editing
Mitsugu Shiratori – Kokuho; Hiroshi Ishigai – Suzuki=Bakudan; Masaharu Tanabe – 366 Days; Shota Nagamura – Tokyo Taxi; Fusao Yuwaki – Hero's Island	Tsuyoshi Imai – Kokuho; Hiroshi Sugimoto – Tokyo Taxi; Sakura Seya – Exit 8; Mitsuo Nishio – 1st Kiss; Suguru Ninomiya – Suzuki=Bakudan
Best Foreign Language Film	Newcomer of the Year
Conclave; Twilight of the Warriors: Walled In; Mission: Impossible – The Final Reckoning; One Battle After Another; F1	Yamato Kochi – Exit 8; Noa Shiroyama – 5 Centimeters per Second; Runa Nakashima – Tokyo Taxi; Ryota Bando – Suzuki=Bakudan; Takaya Matsutani – One Last Throw; Ai Mikami – Kokuho; Misato Morita – Night Flower
Special Award of Honour from the Association	Award for Distinguished Service from the Chairman
Kumiko Ogawa; Kazuko Kurosawa; Jiro Shindo; Tadamitsu Nishida	Mayumi Ogawa; Yoshiko Sakuma; Gisaburō Sugii; Yozo Tanaka; Seiji Mori
In Memoriam	Special Award from the Chairman
Shoji Ueda; Masahiro Shinoda; Kazuko Yoshiyuki; Kazuo Ikehiro	Ayumi Ishida; Tatsuya Nakadai; Masato Harada; Nobuyoshi Otani
