= Tokyo Taxi =

2025 Japanese drama film

- Promotional poster
- Japanese: TOKYOタクシー
- Directed by: Yoji Yamada
- Screenplay by: Yûzô Asahara; Yoji Yamada
- Story by: Christian Carion; Cyril Gély
- Produced by: Fusa Shunsuke
- Starring: Chieko Baisho; Takuya Kimura
- Cinematography: Chikamori Masashi
- Edited by: Hiroshi Sugimoto
- Music by: Iwasaki Taisei
- Production company: Shochiku
- Distributed by: Shochiku
- Release dates: October 29, 2025 (Tokyo); November 21, 2025 (Japan)
- Running time: 103 minutes
- Country: Japan
- Language: Japanese
- Box office: US$1,870,500

Tokyo Taxi (Japanese: TOKYOタクシー) is a 2025 Japanese drama film co-written and directed by Yoji Yamada. The film, a remake of 2022 French-Belgian drama film Driving Madeleine is produced by Shochiku. Starring Chieko Baisho and Takuya Kimura, the film tells a story that celebrates the joys of life in the ever-changing metropolis of Tokyo.

The film had its Asian Premiere at the 38th Tokyo International Film Festival on October 29, 2025, in Centerpiece.

== Synopsis ==
Koji Usami, a hardworking Tokyo taxi driver facing financial pressures, is hired by 85-year-old Madame Takano Sumire for a ride to a nursing home in Hayama, Kanagawa. Initially unfriendly, the two gradually warm up to each other during the trip. At Sumire's request, they make several detours around Tokyo, allowing her to revisit meaningful places from her past. As the day unfolds, she shares memories of personal loss and hardship. Their shared journey becomes a turning point, leaving a lasting emotional impact on the both of them.

== Cast ==
- Chieko Baisho as Sumire Takano
  - Yu Aoi as young Sumire
- Takuya Kimura as Kôji Usami
- Takaya Sakoda as Takeshi Ogawa, Sumire's husband
- Yuka as Kaoru Usami, Kôji Usami's wife
- Runa Nakashima as Nana Usami
- Misuzu Kamino as Nobuko Takano
- Lee Jun-young as Kim Young-gi
- Takashi Sasano as Seiichiro Abe
- Sanma Akashiya as Sada, a colleague of Koji (voice)
- Shinobu Otake as Keiko, the older sister of Koji (voice)

== Production ==
On January 23, 2025 Shochiku announced production of director Yoji Yamada 91st film, Tokyo Taxi starring Chieko Baisho and Takuya Kimura in lead roles.

Principal photography took place in Tokyo and surrounding areas between February and April 2025.

The film was shot on location in Shibamata and Yokohama. It utilized a new technology On-set virtual production for the scenes inside the moving taxi, which made up the majority of the film.

== Release ==
Tokyo Taxi had its Asian premiere at the 38th Tokyo International Film Festival on October 29, 2025, in Centerpiece.

A release ceremony to commemorate Yamada Yoji's 91st film took place on October 20 at Tokyo Tower in Minato, Tokyo. Director Yamada attended the event along with cast members Chieko Baisho and Takuya Kimura.

The film will be presented in Limelight at the 55th International Film Festival Rotterdam for its European premiere in February 2026.

The film was released on November 21, 2025, in Japanese theatres by Shochiku.

== Accolades ==
Award	Date of ceremony	Category	Recipient	Result	Ref.
Nikkan Sports Film Awards	28 December 2025	Best Film	Tokyo Taxi	Nominated	
Nikkan Sports Film Awards	28 December 2025	Best Director	Yoji Yamada	Nominated	
Nikkan Sports Film Awards	28 December 2025	Best Actor	Takuya Kimura	Nominated	
Nikkan Sports Film Awards	28 December 2025	Best Actress	Chieko Baisho	Nominated	
Mainichi Film Awards	10 February 2026	Best Cinematography	Shinji Chikamori	Nominated	
Blue Ribbon Awards	17 February 2026	Best Film	Tokyo Taxi	Nominated	
Blue Ribbon Awards	17 February 2026	Best Director	Yoji Yamada	Won	
Blue Ribbon Awards	17 February 2026	Best Actor	Takuya Kimura	Nominated	
Blue Ribbon Awards	17 February 2026	Best Actress	Chieko Baisho	Nominated	
Japan Academy Film Prize	13 March 2026	Best Film	Tokyo Taxi	Nominated	
Japan Academy Film Prize	13 March 2026	Best Screenplay	Yoji Yamada and Yuzo Asahara	Nominated	
Japan Academy Film Prize	13 March 2026	Best Actress	Chieko Baisho	Won	
Japan Academy Film Prize	13 March 2026	Best Supporting Actress	Yū Aoi	Nominated	
Japan Academy Film Prize	13 March 2026	Best Music	Taisei Iwasaki	Nominated	
Japan Academy Film Prize	13 March 2026	Best Cinematography	Masashi Chikamori	Nominated	
Japan Academy Film Prize	13 March 2026	Best Lighting Direction	Masato Tsuchiyama	Nominated	
Japan Academy Film Prize	13 March 2026	Best Art Direction	Takashi Nishimura	Nominated	
Japan Academy Film Prize	13 March 2026	Best Sound Recording	Shota Nagamura	Nominated	
Japan Academy Film Prize	13 March 2026	Best Film Editing	Hiroshi Sugimoto	Nominated	
Japan Academy Film Prize	13 March 2026	Newcomer of the Year	Runa Nakashima	Won	
