= Jiro Sato (actor) =

Japanese actor, screenwriter and film director

- 佐藤 二朗
- Born: 7 May 1969 (age 57); Kasugai City, Aichi Prefecture, Japan
- Education: Shinshu University Faculty of Economics
- Occupations: Actor, screenwriter
- Years active: 1995–present
- Agent: From First Production
- Website: satojiro.com (in Japanese)

Jiro Sato (佐藤 二朗, Satō Jirō; born 7 May 1969) is a Japanese actor, screenwriter and film director. He grew up in Tōgō, Aichi District. He is represented with From First Production. He graduated from Shinshu University Faculty of Economics.

== Career ==
After graduating from university, Sato joined Recruit Holdings Co., Ltd. However, feeling that he did not fit in with the company's culture during the company's induction ceremony, he left after just one day. He then pursued a career in acting and joined several theater companies, but his time with each was short-lived. Concluding that he was not suited for acting, he took a job at a small advertising agency. Assigned to the sales department, he quickly became the company's top salesperson.

Unable to give up his dream of acting, Sato co-founded the theater unit Chikarawaza in 1996. He later caught the attention of director Yuichi Fukuda and became a regular cast member in Fukuda's productions.

In 2024, Sato revealed that he had been living with obsessive-compulsive disorder (OCD) for many years.

In 2026, his performance in Suzuki=Bakudan earned him the Best Supporting Actor award at the 49th Japan Academy Film Prize.

== Controversies ==
On July 1, 2026, Shūkan Bunshun reported that Sato had been accused of workplace harassment by actress Ai Hashimoto, with whom he had appeared in the Fuji Television drama Surname Confidential. According to the report, Hashimoto had requested restrictions on physical contact before filming because she had experienced harassment during a previous production. The producer conveyed the request to Sato's manager, but the manager did not relay it to Sato, and the producer accepted that the information had not been passed on. During a scene filmed on March 22nd, Sato touched Hashimoto's chin while giving acting instructions. The following day, the producer informed Sato directly of Hashimoto's request that physical contact be limited to her shoulders and arms unless prior consent had been obtained. According to Sato's agency, he complied with the restrictions thereafter.

In an interview with Shūkan Shinchō, Sato stated that he had not been informed of Hashimoto's request until after the on-set incident because his manager had not relayed the producer's message. He said that he then requested a meeting in Hashimoto's dressing room without a prior appointment and explained that, because they were portraying a married couple, he could not guarantee that there would be no physical contact during filming. According to Sato, he was later summoned by the chief producer to a meeting attended by Hashimoto and the president of her agency, where both sides agreed that physical contact would generally be limited to her shoulders and arms, while contact with other areas would require prior consent. Sato further stated that, after the first episode aired, he revisited Hashimoto's dressing room to praise her performance and told her that, if she intended to impose physical-contact restrictions while portraying a married couple, she should not continue working as an actor. He stopped greeting her. According to the report, a lawyer retained by Fuji Television instructed Sato not to enter Hashimoto's dressing room, to communicate important matters through his manager, to avoid physical contact except where required for filming and with prior consent, and that he should limit future interactions with her.

Fuji TV's investigation report stated that, following the second dressing-room visit, Hashimoto became unable to participate in promotional activities because of her deteriorating condition. The report also stated that Hashimoto expressed concern that "the male actor might disclose information relating to this matter." Sato stated in his Shukan Shincho interview that he had discussed the dispute with a fellow actor who was his friend and later told Hashimoto that the actor agreed with his view of the situation.

On July 7, he announced on X that he was severing ties with Fuji TV, and requested that his starring scenes be cut from the upcoming film Bayside Shakedown: N.E.W, scheduled to be released in September.

== Filmography ==
=== TV drama ===
Year	Title	Role	Notes	Ref.
2001	Black Jack: Karute II	Doctor		
2003–06	Kētai Keiji Zenigata series	Mysterious man and others	4 seasons	
2005	Densha Otoko	Monto Kuroki		
2005	Kiken na Aneki	Jun Madarame		
2005	Yaoh	Kinshiro		
2008	Gokusen	Toyosaku Ushijima	season 3	
2009–14	Yō-jū Mameshiba	Jiro Shiba	Lead role; 4 seasons	
2011	Yūsha Yoshihiko	Hotoke		
2015	Death Note	Kanzo Mogi		
2016	Kami no Shita o Motsu Otoko	Kanji Miyazawa		
2020	Daddy is My Classmate	Tetsuo Akasaka		
2022	The 13 Lords of the Shogun	Hiki Yoshikazu	Taiga drama	
2026	Surname Confidential		Lead role	

=== Films ===
Year	Title	Role	Notes	Ref.
2009	Yō-jū Mameshiba	Jiro Shiba	Lead role	
2015	The Big Bee	Imaeda-kachō		
2017	Gin Tama	Takeichi Henpeita		
2017	Mary and the Witch's Flower	Flanagan (voice)		
2019	The Fable	Kenjiro Takoda		
2021	Kaguya-sama Final: Love Is War	Shozo Tanuma and Narrator		
2021	The Fable: The Killer Who Doesn't Kill	Kenjiro Takoda		
2022	Missing	Satoshi Harada	Lead role	
2022	Violence Action	Sandaime		
2022	Black Night Parade	Teru Yoshikawa		
2023	Revolver Lily	Hiraoka		
2023	Once Upon a Crime	King Bovell		
2024	The Floor Plan	Kurihara	Lead role	
2024	A Girl Named Ann	Tamotsu Tatara		
2024	Saint Young Men: The Movie	Hermit		
2024	A Conviction of Marriage	Shingo Fujita		
2025	Under Ninja	Akikazu Yoshida		
2025	True Beauty: Before	Shigemichi Yoda		
2025	True Beauty: After	Shigemichi Yoda		
2025	The Killer Goldfish			
2025	Suzuki=Bakudan	Tagosaku Suzuki		
2025	New Interpretation of the End of Edo Period	Saigō Takamori	Lead role	
2026	The Brightest Sun	Yonemoto		
2026	Nameless	Taro Yamada	Lead role; also writer	
2026	Sakamoto Days	A Rambo-like hitman		
2026	New Theatrical Movie Keroro Gunsō	Hotoke (Buddha) (voice)		
2026	Bayside Shakedown: N.E.W	Hikaru Sashikata		
2026	The Sound of You	Kuniharu Shimizu		

=== Video games ===
Year	Title	Role	Notes	Ref.
2020	Death Come True	Kenichi Mino		

=== Japanese dub ===
Live-action

Year	Title	Role	Voice dub for	Notes	Ref.
2018	The House with a Clock in Its Walls	Jonathan Barnavelt	Jack Black		
2019	Shazam!	Mall Santa	Brian Kaulback		
2019	The Lion King	Pumbaa	Seth Rogen		

Animation

Year	Title	Role	Notes	Ref.
2015	Inside Out	Bing Bong		
2023	Teenage Mutant Ninja Turtles: Mutant Mayhem	Superfly		

== Bibliography ==
Year	Title	Ref.
2016	Jiro Sato Nau	

== Awards and nominations ==
Year	Award	Category	Work(s)	Result	Ref.
2022	47th Hochi Film Awards	Best Actor	Missing	Nominated	
2023	77th Mainichi Film Awards	Best Actor	Missing	Nominated	
2023	65th Blue Ribbon Awards	Best Actor	Missing	Nominated	
2025	79th Mainichi Film Awards	Best Supporting Performance	A Girl Named Ann	Nominated	
2025	67th Blue Ribbon Awards	Best Supporting Actor	A Girl Named Ann and others	Nominated	
2025	48th Japan Academy Film Prize	Best Supporting Actor	A Girl Named Ann	Nominated	
2025	50th Hochi Film Awards	Best Supporting Actor	Suzuki=Bakudan	Won	
2025	38th Nikkan Sports Film Awards	Best Supporting Actor	Suzuki=Bakudan	Nominated	
2026	80th Mainichi Film Awards	Best Supporting Performance	Suzuki=Bakudan	Won	
2026	68th Blue Ribbon Awards	Best Supporting Actor	Suzuki=Bakudan	Won	
2026	49th Japan Academy Film Prize	Best Supporting Actor	Suzuki=Bakudan	Won	
2026	50th Elan d'or Awards	Elan d'or Award	Himself	Won	
2026	99th Kinema Junpo Awards	Best Supporting Actor	Suzuki=Bakudan and others	Won	
