= Love Letter (1981 film) =

- Film poster
- Directed by: Yōichi Higashi
- Screenplay by: Yōzō Tanaka
- Based on: Mitsuharu Kaneko's Love Letter by Yōkō Emori
- Produced by: Katsuhiro Maeda
- Starring: Keiko Takahashi; Katsuo Nakamura; Mariko Kaga; Noboru Nakaya; Ken Nishida
- Cinematography: Koichi Kawakami
- Edited by: Keiko Ichihara
- Music by: Michi Tanaka
- Production companies: Gentosha; Nikkatsu
- Distributed by: Nikkatsu
- Release date: August 7, 1981 (Japan)
- Running time: 83 minutes
- Country: Japan
- Language: Japanese

Love Letter (Japanese: ラブレター, Hepburn: Rabu reta) is a 1981 Japanese Roman Porno drama film directed by Yōichi Higashi and written by Yōzō Tanaka. The film was based on the nonfiction novel Mitsuharu Kaneko's Love Letter by Yōkō Emori, first published in May 1976 by Pep Publishing. It tells the true story of a young woman in love with a significantly older married poet. The film stars Keiko Takahashi in the lead role, in addition to Katsuo Nakamura, Mariko Kaga, Noboru Nakaya and Ken Nishida. Michi Tanaka composed the film's score. Love Letter was theatrically released by Nikkatsu on August 7, 1981, in Japan.

== Plot ==
The film is a fictionalized retelling of the true story of Reiko Okochi, who was in a 30 year long relationship with the married poet Mitsuharu Kaneko.

It has been six years since the poet Toshiharu Oda took Yuko Kano, a woman 34 years his junior, as his mistress. The two of them, who call each other "Toshi" and "rabbit" respectively, indulge in their lust whenever they can. Yuko is often forced to wait for Oda. When he becomes lonely, he will show up, but only his living expenses arrive on a regular basis.

One day, Yuko learns that Oda is nursing his sick wife. Feeling intensely lonely, she takes many sleeping pills and collapses. Oda arrives just in time to see her fall to the ground. He rushes over, spreads plastic on her tatami mats and washes her with running water. Under Oda's care, Yuko recovers.

Later, Oda talks with a man named Murai in a nearby park. Murai is the estranged ex-husband of Tayo, a prostitute living in an apartment next door to Yuko. Murai openly lusts after Yuko. Oda misunderstands this conversation and believes Yuko cheated on him. He tattoos her inner thigh as punishment. However, in doing so, Oda suddenly realizes that he has "registered" Yuko and made her his official wife. He immediately removes the tattoo. Yuko forgives him, as her only wish is for Oda to always be by her side.

The students that regularly visit Tayo also lust after Yuko. They taunt her over her relationship with the old man. Yuko endures their slights and remains faithful to Oda.

Eventually, Yuko becomes pregnant with Oda's child, but Oda opposes the pregnancy and forces her to get an abortion. Yuko becomes mentally ill and is hospitalized. She recovers slowly, and on the day she is to be discharged, Yuko is shocked to learn of Oda's sudden death.

After Oda's funeral, Yuko visits his family. She lights incense sticks in his memory. When she sees Oda's photo, Yuko bursts into tears.

== Cast ==
- Keiko Takahashi as Yuko Kano (credited as Keiko Sekine)
- Katsuo Nakamura as Toshiharu Oda
- Mariko Kaga as Tayo
- Noboru Nakaya as Murai, Tayo's Ex-Husband
- Ken Nishida as Matsubara
- Ryoji Nakamura as Ichikawa
- Toshiyuki Kitami as Sakamaki
- Tomoko Udagawa as Orie
- Kaoru Endō as Yoiko
- Rie Ito as Anoko
- Ryuichi Ogawa as Ishii
- Takuya Hiramitsu as Kimura
- Noboru Mitani as Gynecologist

== Background ==
Emori's novel documented the real life 30-year relationship between poet Mitsuharu Kaneko and Reiko Okochi, a woman 34 years his junior. It was based on Okochi's recollections.

Love Letter was meant to commemorate the 10th anniversary of Nikkatsu's Roman Porno line of films.

== Release ==
Love Letter was theatrically released by Nikkatsu on August 7, 1981, in Japan, where it was a financial success. The film was later released to DVD on October 9, 1998. It was also released to Blu-ray by Happinet on August 2, 2016.

== Awards and nominations ==
6th Hochi Film Awards

- Won: Best Supporting Actor (Katsuo Nakamura, also won for Kagero-za and Buriki no kunsho)

5th Japan Academy Awards

- Won: Outstanding Performance by an Actor in a Supporting Role (Katsuo Nakamura, also won for Kagero-za, Shikake-nin Baian and Buriki no kunsho)
- Nominated: Screenplay of the Year (Yōzō Tanaka, also nominated for Kagero-za, Shikake-nin Baian and Female Teacher: Dirty Afternoon)
- Nominated: Outstanding Performance by an Actress in a Supporting Role (Mariko Kaga, also nominated for Kagero-za and Muddy River)

57th Kinema Junpo Best Ten Awards

- Won: Best Supporting Actor (Katsuo Nakamura, also won for Kagero-za)
