= Mainichi Film Award for Best Supporting Performance =

Annual Japanese film award

- Awarded for: Best Supporting Performance of the year
- Country: Japan
- First award: 2024

The Mainichi Film Award for Best Supporting Performance is a film award given at the Mainichi Film Awards. In 2024, the Mainichi Film Awards announced that the four acting categories would be retired and replaced with two gender neutral categories, with both Best Supporting Male and Best Supporting Female merging into the Best Supporting Performance category.

== Award winners ==
| Year | Actor | Film |
|---|---|---|
| 2024 | Sosuke Ikematsu | My Sunshine |
| 2024 | Maki Carrousel | Voice |
| 2025 | Masataka Kubota | Hero's Island |
| 2025 | Jiro Sato | Suzuki=Bakudan |
