= Mainichi Film Award for Best Lead Performance =

Annual Japanese film award

- Awarded for: Best Lead Performance of the year
- Country: Japan
- First award: 2024

The Mainichi Film Award for Best Lead Performance is a film award given at the Mainichi Film Awards. In 2024, the Mainichi Film Awards announced that the four acting categories would be retired and replaced with two gender neutral categories, with both Best Male Lead and Best Female Lead merging into the Best Lead Performance category.

== Award winners ==
Year	Actor	Film
2024	Yuumi Kawai	A Girl Named Ann; Desert of Namibia
2024	Ryusei Yokohama	Faceless
2025	Ryo Yoshizawa	Kokuho
