= Lake of Tears (film) =

- Film poster
- Directed by: Tomotaka Tasaka
- Written by: Naoyuki Suzuki
- Produced by: Hiroshi Okawa
- Starring: Yoshiko Sakuma; Katsuo Nakamura; Nakamura Ganjirō II
- Cinematography: Masahiko Iimura
- Edited by: Shintarō Miyamoto
- Music by: Masaru Sato
- Distributed by: Toei Company
- Release date: November 13, 1966 (Japan)
- Running time: 129 minutes
- Country: Japan
- Language: Japanese

Lake of Tears (Japanese: 湖の琴, Hepburn: Umi no Koto) is a 1966 Japanese film directed by Tomotaka Tasaka. It was Japan's submission to the 39th Academy Awards for the Academy Award for Best Foreign Language Film, but was not accepted as a nominee.

== Cast ==
- Yoshiko Sakuma as Saku
- Katsuo Nakamura as Ukichi Matsumiya
- Nakamura Ganjirō II as Samezaemon
- Hisano Yamaoka as Matsue Torii
- Minoru Chiaki as Kidayu Momose
- Michiyo Kogure as Suzuko
- Kirin Kiki as Kayo Sugumo
- Kunie Tanaka as Kenkichi Ohara
- Chiyo Okada as Masuko
- Junko Miyazono as Teruko

== See also ==
- List of submissions to the 39th Academy Awards for Best Foreign Language Film
- List of Japanese submissions for the Academy Award for Best Foreign Language Film
