= Noa Shiroyama =

Japanese actress (born 2012)

- 白山 乃愛
- Born: July 11, 2012 (age 14); Saitama Prefecture, Japan
- Occupation: Actress
- Years active: 2022–present
- Agent: Toho Entertainment

Noa Shiroyama (Japanese: 白山 乃愛, Hepburn: Shiroyama Noa; born July 11, 2012) is a Japanese actress.

== Career ==
In 2022, Shiroyama won the Grand Prix at the prestigious "Toho Cinderella Audition", a long-running talent competition that has launched the careers of actresses such as Yasuko Sawaguchi and Masami Nagasawa. The following year, Shiroyama made an acting debut in the television series Dr. Chocolate. In 2026, the performance in 5 Centimeters per Second earned the Newcomer of the Year award at the 49th Japan Academy Film Prize.

== Filmography ==
=== Television ===
Year	Title	Role	Notes	Ref.
2023	Dr. Chocolate	Yui "Dr. Chocolate" Terashima		
2023	Yuria's Red String of Fate	Mani Oyamada		
2024	Sky Castle	Maju Asami		
2024	Re:Revenge	Misaki Asahina		
2025	A Calm Sea and Beautiful Days with You	Yoko Yoshimori		
2025	Absolute Zero: Invisibleen Emies	Mayu Hisano	Episode 7	
2026	Iroha's Love Runs Across Eras	Saya Ichinose		

=== Film ===
Year	Title	Role	Notes	Ref.
2024	Fushigi Dagashiya Zenitendō	Aika Ono		
2025	5 Centimeters per Second	Akari Shinohara (young)		
2025	Scarlet	Girl (voice)		

=== Japanese dub ===
Year	Title	Role	Notes	Ref.
2026	Toy Story 5	Blaze Manoukian		

=== Radio drama ===
Year	Title	Role	Channel	Ref.
2025	The Moon Sets in the Rice Fields	Kaede	NHK FM	

== Awards and nominations ==
Year	Award	Category	Work(s)	Result	Ref.
2026	49th Japan Academy Film Prize	Newcomer of the Year	5 Centimeters per Second	Won	
