= Buriki no kunsho =

- Theatrical release poster
- Directed by: Setsuo Nakayama
- Screenplay by: Kenichi Yoshii; Yoshi Yokota
- Story by: Shinsaku Noju
- Produced by: Setsuo Nakayama; Kenichi Yoshii
- Starring: Katsuo Nakamura; Shūichi Suzuki; Etsuko Ichihara
- Cinematography: Katsutoshi Iwanaga
- Edited by: Tatsuji Nakashizu
- Music by: Kuni Kawachi
- Production companies: Nakayama Film Co., Ltd
- Release date: May 9, 1981 (Japan)
- Running time: 105 minutes
- Country: Japan
- Language: Japanese

Buriki no kunsho (Japanese: ブリキの勲章), also known as Tin Medal, is a 1981 Japanese film directed by Setsuo Nakayama.

== Cast ==
- Katsuo Nakamura as Kimura
- Shūichi Suzuki as Hideo Nemoto (根本英雄)
- Etsuko Ichihara
- Michiko Hayashi
- Rie Kimura
- Masami Horiuchi

== Awards ==
5th Japan Academy Prize

- Won: Best Supporting Actor - Katsuo Nakamura (also won for Kagero-za, Love Letter and Shikake-nin Baian)

6th Hochi Film Award

- Won: Best Supporting Actor - Katsuo Nakamura (also won for Kagero-za and Shikake-nin Baian)
