= It Must Be Heaven =

2019 film

- Cannes release poster
- Directed by: Elia Suleiman
- Written by: Elia Suleiman
- Produced by: Édouard Weil; Laurine Pelassy; Elia Suleiman; Zeynep Özbatur Atakan; Martin Hampel; Thanassis Karathanos; Michel Merkt; Serge Noël
- Starring: Elia Suleiman
- Narrated by: Elia Suleiman
- Cinematography: Sofian El Fani
- Edited by: Véronique Lange
- Production companies: Rectangle Productions; Pallas Film; Nazira Films; Possibles Media; Zeynofilm
- Distributed by: Le Pacte
- Release date: 24 May 2019 (Cannes)
- Running time: 97 minutes
- Countries: France; Germany; Canada; Qatar; Palestine; Turkey
- Languages: Arabic; French; English; Spanish; Hebrew

It Must Be Heaven (Arabic: إن شئت كما في السماء, romanized: ʾin šiʾtu kamā fīs-samāʾ, lit. 'If you wish, as in heaven') is a 2019 internationally co-produced comedy-drama film directed, written and starred by Elia Suleiman. It was selected to compete for the Palme d'Or at the 2019 Cannes Film Festival.

It was selected as the Palestinian entry for the Best International Feature Film at the 92nd Academy Awards, but it was not nominated.

== Plot ==
A Palestinian man travels abroad. He encounters strange and familiar scenes.

== Cast ==
- Elia Suleiman as himself
- Ali Suliman as Brother 1 in Restaurant
- François Girard as Policeman
- Gael García Bernal as himself
- Nancy Grant as Producer
- Guy Sprung as Professor
- Kwasi Songui as Taxi driver
- Stephen McHattie as Fortune teller
- Raïa Haïdar as Femen
- Alain Dahan as Immigration officer
- Vincent Maraval as Producer
- Grégoire Colin as Man in subway

== Reception ==
As of October 2021, the film holds a 96% approval rating on review aggregator website Rotten Tomatoes, based on 49 reviews, with an average rating of 7.5/10. The website's critics consensus reads: "An entrancing blend of the poignant and the absurd, It Must Be Heaven finds writer-director Elia Suleiman returning to action in peak form." On Metacritic, the film holds a rating of 69 out of 100, based on 8 reviews, indicating "generally favorable".

== Awards ==
At the 2019 Cannes Film Festival, It Must Be Heaven received the Special Mention from the Main Competition Jury, and the FIPRESCI Prize for Best Film In Competition.

At the 2019 Brussels International Film Festival (BRIFF), the film was awarded 4,000 € in broadcasting rights in Belgium.

== See also ==
- List of submissions to the 92nd Academy Awards for Best International Feature Film
- List of Palestinian submissions for the Academy Award for Best International Feature Film
