= Nana Rokusha =

Japanese model, entertainer, and actress (born 1973)

- 六車 奈々
- Born: December 2, 1973 (age 52); Kyoto Prefecture, Japan
- Education: Kyoto Municipal Hiyoshi Months High School; Otemon Gakuin University Faculty of Letters Asian Culture Department
- Occupations: Model, entertainer, actress
- Agent: Amuse, Inc.
- Height: 1.6 m (5 ft 3 in) (2010)

Nana Rokusha (六車 奈々, Rokusha Nana; born December 2, 1973 in Kyoto Prefecture, Japan) is a Japanese model, entertainer, and actress who is represented by Amuse, Inc.

== Education ==
Rokusha graduated from Kyoto Municipal Hiyoshigaoka High School and Otemon Gakuin University Faculty of Letters Asian Culture Department.

== Career ==
She debuted as a model when she was fifteen years old. Rokusha worked as a model and entertainer in Osaka and in December 2005 she passed an audition for the Tokyo Broadcasting System drama Byōin e Ikou! and moved to Amuse on Tokyo.

She made regular appearances in the Kansai Telecasting Corporation series Sata Uma! Because of that, Rokusha did more work related to horse racing, including the Television Nishinippon Corporation series Dream Keiba, where she appeared as a quasi-regular guest with Rica Imai.

== Filmography ==
=== Drama ===
Year	Title	Role	Network	Notes
2002	Koi Dra: Ichigo Lyric		YTV	
2003	Kaoruko Reiko		YTV	
2003	17-sai Natsu		ABC	Episode 1
2004	Unmei no Deai: Thoroughbred ni Kaketa Yume		KTV	
2006	Ai no Gekijō: Byōin e Ikou!		TBS	Lead role
	Dare ga Papa ya Nen!	Michiko Okazaki	NHK	
2011	Yūsha Yoshihiko	Kirana Village woman	TV Tokyo	Episode 3

=== TV series ===
Year	Title	Network	Notes
1997	Noburo Harada no Mezase! Par Golf 2	Sun TV	Assistant
2002	Tsūkai! Everyday	KTV	Friday Regular
2002	Sata Uma!	KTV	
2003	Takajin One Man	MBS	
2003	Butcha ke! Nama Tamagon	KTV	
2005	Renai Jōhō Variety Uso ka!? Makoto ka!?	KTV	
2006	Price Variety Nanbo De Nanbo	KTV	
2007	Dream Keiba	Television Nishinippon Corporation	
2009	Shūkan Umaji	BS Fuji	Guest
2009	Shūkan! Kenkō Calendar Karada no Kimochi	CBC	Host
	Getsuyō-ba Gekijō	Green Channel	
	Shirita Gari	Fuji TV	
	iChannel	Green Channel	Irregular appearances

=== Films ===
Year	Title	Notes
1997	Aru Ni tsu Chibi ga Ita yo	Short film
1998	Heroine! Naniwa Bombers	
2000	All Right	
	Enoarumachi: Himawari Kōen de	
