= Yūsha Yoshihiko =

- 勇者ヨシヒコ
- Genre: Comedy, Fantasy, Parody
- Written by: Yūichi Fukuda
- Directed by: Yūichi Fukuda
- Starring: Takayuki Yamada; Haruka Kinami; Tsuyoshi Muro; Azusa Okamoto; Jiro Sato; Shin Takuma
- Opening theme: Season1; Mihimaru GT "Evo Revolution"; Season2; Straightener "From Noon Till Dawn" (feat.TabuZombie&KunikazuTanaka); Season3; JAM Project "The Brave"
- Ending theme: Season1; Tee "Aishi Tsuzukeru Kara"; Season2; Moumoon "Doko e mo ikanai yo" Season3; 7!! "Kimi ga irunara"
- Composer: Eishi Segawa
- Country of origin: Japan
- Original language: Japanese
- No. of seasons: 3
- No. of episodes: 35

Production
- Running time: 40 minutes

Original release
- Network: TV Tokyo
- Release: July 9, 2011 – December 2016

Yūsha Yoshihiko to Maō no Shiro (勇者ヨシヒコと魔王の城; lit. 'The Hero Yoshihiko and the Demon King's Castle') is a 2011 Japanese television parody comedy about Yoshihiko, an inept hero who sets out to find the cure to a plague, but ends up fighting a larger evil. Yoshihiko is guided by a comedic Buddha, and accompanied by an incompetent wizard, a woman who wants to kill Yoshihiko because she thinks he killed her father, and a warrior who will kill Yoshihiko as soon as the warrior finishes telling Yoshihiko his stories. Yūsha Yoshihiko is heavily influenced by the RPG game series Dragon Quest, with Yoshihiko's outfit and most of the monsters being directly lifted from the series. It also contains references to other fantasy series and comedies, such as Monty Python.

The second season Yūsha Yoshihiko to Akuryou no Kagi (勇者ヨシヒコと悪霊の鍵; lit. 'The Hero Yoshihiko and the Key of the Evil Spirit') was broadcast in 2012. The third season Yūsha Yoshihiko to Michibikareshi Shichinin (勇者ヨシヒコと導かれし七人; lit. 'The Hero Yoshihiko and the Seven Chosen Ones') was broadcast in 2016.

== Plot ==
Yūsha Yoshihiko is a young, adventurous child who inevitably becomes The Hero Yoshihiko after the Hero Teruhiko, who went searching for a miracle herb to cure a plague which struck the village, never returned. He pulls a sacred sword from a stone within his village, which determines him as the next Hero. Due to these events, Yoshihiko must embark on a journey to the Evil King's castle to find a cure for the plague that has stricken his village. Along the way, he finds many new companions and allies, who help Yoshihiko reach his ultimate goal.

== Characters ==
=== Yoshihiko ===
A young man of Kaboi Village who pulls the legendary Beckoning Sword from a boulder and becomes the Hero destined to defeat the Demon Lord. Dim-witted and overly trusting, Yoshihiko often aids enemies to the detriment of the party. He frequently abandons the quest to pursue unheroic goals, often to lust after recently-met women. Known to enter the homes of strangers and smash their pots, not understanding the angry reactions of the inhabitants. Yoshihiko is easily excited by magic — whenever he meets a magic-user, he insists on being the target of any spells they know.

=== Danjo ===
Middle-aged bandit who follows Yoshihiko in hopes of finishing a lengthy story he began telling, after which Danjo will kill him. Tall, strong and clad in animal hides, Danjo is a capable warrior who takes great pride in his sideburns. He serves as the pragmatic mentor of the group, although he sometimes gives into the vices of drinking and women.

=== Murasaki ===
A sour-tempered village girl who believes Yoshihiko murdered her father and wishes to kill him in revenge. Yoshihiko convinces her to put off killing him until they discover the truth of her father's murder (a subplot that is never again addressed). Murasaki develops a crush for Yoshihiko, although her feelings are not reciprocated — Yoshihiko is unimpressed by her unfeminine figure. Murasaki derides Mereb's magical abilities and the two often take jabs at each other, Mereb mocking her for her lack of curves, Murasaki making fun of the mole on his lip. Murasaki becomes a mage during visits to Dharma Shrine and learns a small number of useful spells. She carries an inanimate pet bird on her shoulder that is rarely mentioned but allegedly alive.

=== Mereb ===
The guru of a village, exposed as a fraudster by Yoshiko and company. Mereb joins the party to see the outside world. He learns at least one new magic spell per episode, putting on airs as he describes it to the party, but they are all underpowered cantrips that at best mildly inconvenience the enemy. Between this and his lack of physical prowess, most view Mereb as useless — the church only charges a few gold, or none at all, to revive him, whereas the revival prices for Danjo and Murasaki climb into the tens of thousands. However, Mereb is the most genre savvy character, demonstrating an understanding of modern pop culture, video game mechanics and the fact they are filming a television show. He does his best to keep the others from referencing copyrighted material, and often calls out the low-budget elements of the show.

=== Hotoke ===
An exalted Buddhist deity who, like God in Monty Python and the Holy Grail, appears in the clouds and gives the party tasks to carry out, although Yoshihiko is unable to see him without the aid of special glasses. Hotoke acts in a very un-Buddha-like manner, telling jokes, forgetting his lines and becoming tongue-tied, providing false or incomplete information, getting distracted by mundane trivialities, and cheats on his wife. Like Mereb, he often breaks the fourth wall by referring to the quest as a television show. Every once in a while, Hotoke is forced to restore Yoshihiko's motivation with a resolve-bolstering Buddha Beam.

=== Hisa ===
Yoshihiko's sister. A running gag, she emerges from behind a tree in the last few minutes of each episode to express concern for her brother. Sometimes attempts to sabotage the party's progress to keep Yoshihiko from getting hurt.

== Episodes ==
=== Season 1: The Demon King's Castle (2011) ===
| No. overall | No. in season | Title | Original release date |
|---|---|---|---|
| 1 | 1 | "In Which the Sword Falls Out of the Stone"; Transliteration: "Kabai no Mura" (Japanese: カボイの村) | 8 July 2011 |
In Coboy Village, one of many villages that have been ravaged by a devastating plague, Yoshihiko and his sister Hisa have only each other when their father, the Hero Teruhiko who went searching for a miracle herb to cure the plague, never returned. Now the village held a sword-in-the-stone test to see who will be the next hero, which Yoshihiko passes. With his new Beckoning Sword, he embarks on his journey and first meets a blue blob, who goads him into fighting it. He then encounters Danjo, a fierce fighter with a wild exterior, who vows to kill him as soon as he finishes telling him his life story. Danjo is the first one to note the importance of Yoshihiko's Beckoning Sword. Not long afterwards, they are ambushed by Murasaki, a vengeful girl whose father was supposedly killed by Yoshihiko, though her proof is erroneous. They then stop to get provisions at a guru's village, but the guru Mereb is actually a fraud who can do no more magic than changing someone's nose to that of a pig's once a day. The group is feeling purposeful until they run into a completely unexpected person, and then Buddha suddenly appears to give them a new quest.
| 2 | 2 | "In Which Hideous is Used Too Much"; Transliteration: "Manyā no Mura" (Japanese: マーニャの村) | 15 July 2011 |
After their first quest culminated as an anticlimactic disappointment, Yoshihiko and co. are now on a quest to defeat the Demon King, who is the cause of the plague. Their first battle is against a band of contract mercenaries, who operate on a strict 9-to-5 schedule. Then they wander into a mysteriously empty village, but they soon learn it is the place of a yearly ritual in which they send a young girl as sacrifice to the mountain god who guards the village. Yoshihiko volunteers themselves as escorts for the sacrifice, but hope they can change the mountain god's mind. Along the way, they encounter various enemies, like the Demon King's minions, a mother and her momma's boy, and a killer koala. When they finally reach the mountain god's shrine, things take an unexpected turn. Buddha later shows up to chastise them about straying from their quest, and directs them to head east.
| 3 | 3 | "In Which Hisa Gains a Boyfriend"; Transliteration: "Kiran no Mura" (Japanese: キラナの村) | 22 July 2011 |
Immediately, Yoshihiko and co. are faced with another mercenary, a lewd and scrappy man who devoutly believes in proper dick placement. After all the men are affected by improper dick placement, Murasaki defeats the man using Yoshihiko's Beckoning Sword. The four sleep in forests until a kojima points them towards a village, the target of a cave monster who tears up their crops and attacks the villagers. Since they've been warned that the monster closely guards its cave, Yoshihiko decides to lure it into the village and attack it at night. However, due to his unfortunate ability to sleep without detection, the monster destroys the fields, and the four have no other choice than to confront it in its cave. But they are extremely unprepared for such a high-level monster and are about to forgo the village until one villager lets slip about a swordsmith on the Eastern Mount who can forge an "undaunted blade." Intrigued, the group battles their way up the Eastern Mount to meet Gantesai, who requires a soul in order to forge the sword. The four discover their inner personalities without their soul, and in the end manage to imbue a sword with enough power to destroy the cave monster.
| 4 | 4 | "In Which Yoshihiko Basically Dies Twice"; Transliteration: "Kawa no Jōryū, Tennyo no Iwa" (Japanese: 川の上流、天女の岩) | 29 July 2011 |
Yoshihiko and co. run into another mercenary of the Demon King, but seems to be the evil counterpart of Mereb, which admittedly isn't that evil. Yoshihiko becomes deathly ill after walking through a leech-infested forest, and Buddha appears to give them a proper instruction in their quest: to find the Angel's Robe that will protect them from the Demon King's attacks. Their first obstacle is a kappa, who proves most formidable. They are forced to find a magical weapon to defeat him, but even then, the Angel is highly reluctant to give up her robe. The group tries everything they know, but with Murasaki's idea and Mereb's spell, they find a way to blackmail the Angel in giving them her robe. Having gained an important item, Buddha comes to tell them they now need to head west.
| 5 | 5 | "In Which Tumblr's Gifset Makes Sense"; Transliteration: "Oissu no Mura" (Japanese: オイッスの村) | 5 August 2011 |
The group's first attacker is a surprisingly sexy assassin who uses poison and knives. Unfortunately, he gets carried away rather easily. Buddha gives them another item to acquire: the Shoes of Invincibility. They are hidden in Oith Village, a strange place where five men rule the town and everyone must be funny or be jailed. Pretending to be just travelers, the group is welcomed but are secretly investigating the village and its inhabitants, who are a curious sort. After separating and getting hit with several traps, the four are reunited in a face-off against the leader of the five men. At the end, Buddha gives another item quest: the Demon's Helm, which is rumoured to repel any attack.
| 6 | 6 | "In Which the Poop Looks Like Chocolate Cream"; Transliteration: "Ramūru no Mura" (Japanese: ラムールの村) | 12 August 2011 |
The group faces off against an overzealous husband who neglects his chores and his fed-up wife. While fighting another monster, Danjo becomes confused and attacks Yoshihiko, putting him in the closest village clinic. Gravely injured, Yoshihiko nonetheless wishes to join his group when he realizes they've left town after Buddha told him where to find the Demon's Helm. However, his nurse, Lienne, becomes attached to him and worries about him moving while injured, and takes a monster's attack for him. Danjo, Mereb and Murasaki are powerless against the monster guarding the Demon's Helm, and go back to get Yoshihiko, but are thrown by his decision to forgo the Demon King mission to instead slay the sorcerer who cursed Lienne from being able to kiss a man—Yoshihiko in this case. However, Lienne convinces him he can slay both the monster and the sorcerer, and he breaks the enchantment with a shocking twist. After being devastated, Buddha erases all memories of what transpired so that Yoshihiko is once again focused on the Demon King.
| 7 | 7 | "In Which Mereb-san is Only Worth 5 Gold"; Transliteration: "Pagora no Mura" (Japanese: パゴラの村) | 19 August 2011 |
Murasaki learns a new skill, and no assassins attempt to kill them. Buddha sends them on a quest to find the Dragon Shield, which, by way of an enka singer, they find is in a rich man's house. The man will give them the shield on one condition: that they go and collect years of back rent from the tenants on his rental property. The tenants live in a five-story pagoda, and it appears to follow the usual "level up" format. After going through a mismatched cast of tenants, the group are now on a mission to find the Philosopher's Mail in an eastern village called Akibara.
| 8 | 8 | "In Which Teen Idolship is Threatened"; Transliteration: "Akibara no Mura" (Japanese: アキバラの村) | 26 August 2011 |
The group encounter a former foe, the overzealous husband, though his wife shows up not long afterwards with a bone to pick about his reading habits. On their way to Akibara Village, they pass the Dharma Shrine, which is where they can change jobs in order to learn new skills. They all have an idea of what they want, but Yoshihiko is accidentally forced to become a Teen Idol.
| 9 | 9 | "In Which Mereb-san Learns Crickle"; Transliteration: "Yōsei no Shiro, Shinkan no Mori" (Japanese: 妖精の城、神官の社) | 2 September 2011 |
Almost immediately, a servant of the Demon King pops out in front of them with a chorus of fangirls and stage music. When Buddha tells them that there is one more item to be found, the Ring of Life in the Fairy Village, he fails to tell them where the village is located. However, two young fairies stumble upon them, and Yoshihiko is the only one who can see them. For piggyback rides, the fairies lead them to their castle, where the Goddess of the Fairy Village tells them that the ring had been stolen by the Devil Priest, a bitter foe. The group sets off to get the ring back, but they first have to fight the Priest's half-human, half-animal monster guardians.
| 10 | 10 | "In Which Murasaki Secretly Proclaims Her Love"; Transliteration: "Amane no Mura" (Japanese: アマネの村) | 9 September 2011 |
Amane Village is their last destination before the Demon King's castle. The group won't be able to reach the castle without the help of a flying carpet, which is fortuitously up for auction at a tiny auction house. However, everyone, Yoshihiko especially, is thrown when the winner of the flying carpet turns out to be Hisa, now a married Baroness. Yoshihiko implores her to give them the carpet, but she refuses, and will only relent if they can defeat her esteemed personal chef in a cooking competition. A manservant of the house takes pity on Yoshihiko and tells them of her favorite dish, halo-halo bird with poxy flower. These ingredients are extremely hard to procure, and the group is sent on another quest to retrieve these items.
| 11 | 11 | "In Which You Should Never Fall in Love with a Maid"; Transliteration: "Maō no Jōkamachi" (Japanese: 魔王の城下町) | 16 September 2011 |
Yoshihiko and co. have finally made it to the Demon King's castle town. The Demon King has devilishly camouflaged his castle in the midst of modern Japan, where every building is a candidate for a castle. After replenishing themselves on crepes and ramen, the four split up to increase efficiency. But the Demon King is playing them all into his hands, and the group finds themselves even further engrossed in modern Japanese culture...
| 12 | 12 | "In Which It Ends"; Transliteration: "Maō no Jōkamachi, Maō no Shiro" (Japanese: 魔王の城下町、魔王の城) | 23 September 2011 |
The voice card for all the monsters turns out to be the Demon King himself! Despite his impending battle, the Demon King seems to find Yoshihiko amusing, and sends down his personal servant, Gordon, to greet them with their first battle of Demon King Castle. It does not turn out quite as well as they expected, but Murasaki saves the day with her newly acquired spell. But Gordon is still undefeated, and Buddha tells them there is another sword they need to find, stashed away with Yoshihiko's predecessor, who is hidden somewhere in the city.

=== Season 2: The Key of the Evil Spirit (2012) ===
| No. overall | No. in season | Title | Original release date |
|---|---|---|---|
| 13 | 1 | "In Which There Were Only Two Save Points"; Transliteration: "Kaboi no Mura" (Japanese: カボイの村) | 17 October 2012 |
One hundred years after the Hero Yoshihiko defeated the demon king, someone has broken the seal and evil has been released back into the human world. Yoshihiko's village is about to be overrun by demons, so the village elder decides to gather the young men in the village to choose a hero fit for following Yoshihiko's footsteps. When turned down by the young men, the elder finds out there is a descendant of Yoshihiko's living in the village, who turns out to be a young boy well-versed in child labor laws. Desperate, the elder begs assistance from Buddha, who promises to bring Yoshihiko and his companions back to life. However, they are not brought back entirely complete.
| 14 | 2 | "In Which the Mirror is Useless"; Transliteration: "Ganza no Mura" (Japanese: ガンザの村) | 23 October 2012 |
While wandering around, Yoshihiko and co. come across their first villain, a hipster with a sword and an accompanying hipster girlfriend. Buddha returns from his family trip and tells them they need to find the key to lock up the demons again, but to do that, they must try multiple keys. He directs them to the first location, Ganza Village, where the village chief's son is about to marry a princess from Kabana Village. As Yoshihiko and co. barter with him about the key, a messenger tells them the princess has been kidnapped by bandits, so then Yoshihiko and co. are hired as mercenaries to get the princess with the key as payment. However, the princess is not at all what she appears.
| 15 | 3 | "In Which Only the Young One Looks Passable"; Transliteration: "Dorēpu no Mura" (Japanese: ドレープの村) | 31 October 2012 |
Yoshihiko and co. run into a bandit who misuses poison mist. They then go to a village that has an evil aura around it, and find that there are only men in the village, with not a woman to be seen. At night, Yoshihiko discovers that the men start to walk around and meow like cats. They consult with the local medicine man who tells them that a monster had come and taken away all the women, and none of the strong men were able to stop him. Despite being totally unnecessary to their quest, Yoshihiko and co. take up the mantle and dedicate themselves to finding and returning the women. Yoshihiko and Danjo devise a plan that disgusts and disheartens Murasaki and Mereb, but Murasaki just ends up kidnapped.
| 16 | 4 | "In Which Shiroiko is Super Cute"; Transliteration: "Torodān no Mura" (Japanese: トロダーンの村) | 12 November 2012 |
After Danbe Village, Yoshihiko and co. come across a bandit in training. He's accompanied by a license official who gets Yoshihiko to practice with him. Buddha then directs them to Torodaan Village, where there is a key that emits evilness. Once there, they find the new village chief has been levying a heavy tax on the villagers in exchange for protection against ghosts. Danjo scoffs at the idea of spirits, but in exchange for the key, the four of them agree to go defeat the boss ghost. Through this journey, Danjo is quick to reconsider his position.
| 17 | 5 | "In Which Yoshihiko is Attracted to Wells"; Transliteration: "Sakūra no Mura" (Japanese: サクーラの村) | 19 November 2012 |
Buddha sends Yoshihiko and co. to investigate a Sakurra Village, a town infused with an evil energy. Once there, they meet the village head Konpachi who apologizes for their bad first impression of the village. This is followed by a meeting with a paranoid villager who warns the travelers to escape the town as soon as possible, or risk falling to the brainwashing of a dangerous shaman who hides in the village. Will the shaman's brainwashing defeat Yoshihiko?
| 18 | 6 | "In Which Master Roshi Makes an Appearance"; Transliteration: "Aishisu no Mura" (Japanese: アイシスの村) | 22 November 2012 |
Buddha sends Yoshihiko and co. to the Castle of Isis to investigate a lead on one of the keys. Upon arriving, they gain audience with the King. He explains that what they seek might be in a treasure chest whose key has been posted as the grand prize in a Martial Arts Tournament. Yoshihiko agrees to participate in the tournament but runs into an extremely powerful fighter.
| 19 | 7 | "In Which Monsters Make Better Heroes"; Transliteration: "Kirana no Mura" (Japanese: キラナの村) | 28 November 2012 |
Yoshihiko and co. run into a powerful group of monsters. The Monsters cast a powerful transform spell and turn into doppelgangers of the party. The doppelgangers run off while Yoshihiko and co. chase after them to make sure that they don't cause trouble that will damage their reputation. The party later finds out however that the monsters may not be the ones they have to worry about.
| 20 | 8 | "Episode 8"; Transliteration: "Mōnpota no Mura→Paparata no Mura" (Japanese: ムーンポタの村→パパラタの村) | 6 December 2012 |
Yoshihiko and co. meet a bandit claiming to be a mentalist who always makes a single mistake, so as to make it fun for the audience. However, one mistake made to Yoshihiko results in him falling asleep. After taking new roles at the Dharma Temple, the four head for Moonpota Village guided by the Hotoke. There Yoshihiko tries to run away with a married women, and the other three start betting and playing around in a casino.
| 21 | 9 | "Episode 9"; Transliteration: "Esutasu no Mori" (Japanese: エスタスの村) | 11 December 2012 |
Yoshihiko and co. notice a black smoke rising and learn from the Hotoke that the evil boss Deathtark has taken the Key. To prepare for the final battle he sends them to the inventor of Estas Village, who is to make their equipment. To gather the materials they head towards the Evil Mountain and are waylaid by a bandit who worries too much about her makeup, later a werewolf one, and then a boastful one. After acquiring the needed equipment they head into the Dark World.
| 22 | 10 | "Episode 10"; Transliteration: "Ura Sekai" (Japanese: 裏世界) | 24 December 2012 |
The gang is greeted by a monster with overly long insults that routs them. They find themselves, yet again, in a modern day city gathering information. Yoshihiko ends up helping set up a radio station and the three lounge around the city. After an intervention by the Hotoke they find the Transformation Staff which will allow them to infiltrate the enemy castle and head for the final battle.
| 23 | 11 | "Episode 11"; Transliteration: "Ura Sekai" (Japanese: 裏世界) | 30 December 2012 |
The gang turn themselves into monsters and sneak into the castle, where they promptly confront the Monster Emperor. They are quickly defeated and given a free resurrection on a clearance sale. Hisa is captured and Yoshihiko learns from the Hotoke he needs another item call the Orb of Light from the Emperors' good twin Symposion. After traversing through countless caverns they find him hiding in a closet, and they find out the Orb of Light is in fact his testicles. During the second round they find out that the Emperor isn't the Emperor, but the penguin Yoshihiko saved in Isis. They face the true evil and through the sacrifice of penguin and Yoshihiko they defeat him. Afterwards they seal the monster ask Hotoke to take them to heaven. He messes up and bring back Yoshihiko and the four go on to new adventures.

=== Season 3: The Seven Chosen Ones (2016) ===
| No. overall | No. in season | Title | Original release date |
|---|---|---|---|
| 24 | 1 | Transliteration: "Kaboi no Mura" (Japanese: カボイの村) | 8 October 2016 |
The party end up fighting the final boss due to a bug and die. After a resurrection at the church they meet a bandit unaware of a ninja behind him trying to kill him. They defeat them both, and afterwards level up, acquire new spells and equipment and challenge the Demon King for a second time. They defeat him only to learn from the Hotoke that it wasn't the actual Demon King, but only his governor. He sends them on a quest to find the seven people chosen by fate to battle the Demon King, and tells them to stop spending so much money on CGI.
| 25 | 2 | Transliteration: "Karubado no Mura" (Japanese: カルバドの村) | 15 October 2016 |
While getting the information on where the fist ball needed to defeat the Demon King is the four meet Hotoke's kid and head for the fist village. They spend the day at village and find out during the night that the villagers are zombies who infect Murasaki. On the way to heal her, they all end up infected as well. The guardian supposed to cure their infection, was himself infected by having sex with a cute zombie. They do find a machine capable of curing them and the village, and in such a way acquire the fist ball giving them the ability to summon Sir Robin.
| 26 | 3 | Transliteration: "Efuefu no Mura" (Japanese: エフエフの村) | 22 October 2016 |
The gang run into a bandit with overdue video rentals. After being attacked by a slime, they are transported to a Final Fantasy world. There they join the stylish resistance and plan to overthrow the emperor. Before they are able to however, they are again transported, this time into a Monster Hunter world. Yoshihiko further goes to the world of Mario Bros., while the three return to the Final Fantasy one, and find the second orb. They are all brought back, and after some fierce words from the Hotoke, they are sent north.
| 27 | 4 | Transliteration: "Saragona no Mura" (Japanese: サラゴナの村) | 29 October 2016 |
A village's princess has fallen into a coma, and only the tears of a nearby cyclops can wake her. Yoshihiko instantly falls in love with the sleeping beauty and agrees to obtain the tears in hopes of marrying her. Murasaki, resentful of Yoshihiko's misplaced infatuation, stays behind and is tricked into an assassination plot by an immortality-seeking witch. Yoshihiko is presented with the major choice of Dragon Quest V: whether to marry the newly-met princess, or the girl he has long adventured with.
| 28 | 5 | Transliteration: "Dashuu Mura" (Japanese: ダシュウ村) | 11 November 2016 |
The party, low on HP, find themselves in a farming village lacking inns or shops. Speaking with a garage band resembling the rock group Tokio, they learn the entire village is being magically forced to perform farm labor. The guardian deity Nitteren (referencing rival station Nippon TV) is implicated, much to the chagrin of the copyright-fearing Mereb. The party seeks the aid of the gods Siekusun ("CX", call sign of Fuji TV), Tere Aasa (TV Asahi) and Tereeto (TV Tokyo) to defeat Nitteren.
| 29 | 6 | Transliteration: "Ugasu no Mura" (Japanese: ウガスの村) | 12 November 2016 |
The party arrives in a village of thieves, who immediately steal two of the orbs. The village leader, an honorable collector of rare artifacts, promises to give his own orb to Yoshihiko and have the stolen orbs returned to him. However, a masked woman has already stolen the leader's orb. She then steals something precious from each of the party members: Murasaki's breasts, Mereb's staff, one of Danjo's sideburns, and Yoshihiko's heart. Yoshihiko becomes the Lupin to her Fujiko, but unknown to him, this is not the first time he has encountered this swindler.
| 30 | 7 | Transliteration: "Myujiko no Mura" (Japanese: ミュジコの村) | 19 November 2016 |
Hotoke, who is under investigation for adultery, directs the party to a village where the inhabitants act out various musicals. Yoshihiko and company find themselves involuntarily singing in scenarios from Les Misérables, The Rose of Versailles, The Lion King and Beauty and the Beast, culminating in a musical grand finale battle.
| 31 | 8 | Transliteration: "Baboru no Mura" (Japanese: バボルの村) | 26 November 2016 |
The infidelity scandal is taking its toll on Hotoke, with the new revelation he falsified his academic records and is not qualified to be a buddha. The party arrives at Dharma Temple once again, and once again a clerical error results in Yoshihiko becoming a dog. He joins up with a reluctant hero with a penchant for attracting weak animal allies, while the rest of the party team up with the Goof-off from season 1 in order to win an orb in a festival competition.
| 32 | 9 | Transliteration: "Kyapasu no Mura" (Japanese: キャパスの村) | 3 December 2016 |
The final orb is in the body of a teenage girl — the only way to obtain it is to win her heart. The party hatches a scheme resembling a high school romance drama, with Yoshihiko playing the part of fawning love interest. However, a monster disguised as a rich and handsome student is competing for her love. In order to compete, Yoshihiko switches strategies and becomes a domineering jerk.
| 33 | 10 | Transliteration: "Tenkū Jō" (Japanese: 天空城) | 10 December 2016 |
The earlier controversies have resulted in Hotoke's demotion by four ranks. The party is ready to fight the Demon King, but his stronghold is surrounded by tall mountains — to reach it, they must take control of a flying castle that has been grounded for unknown reasons. Over the course of three attempts, the castle's caretaker leads them to a room where they must overcome a challenge: to tell a funny story on a talk show, to prepare a gourmet meal on a cooking show, and to resist the temptation to clear the dishes of a family dining in a closed restaurant. The party repeatedly fails, each time prompting the host to kill all of them with an instant-death spell. The revival fees have become excessively steep due to their high levels and Yoshihiko is forced to grind for gold after each failure. Yoshihiko eventually realizes the caretaker is not who he appears to be and has ulterior motives.
| 34 | 11 | Transliteration: "Dai Shinden" (Japanese: 大神殿) | 17 December 2016 |
The party enters the Demon King's lair and must collect three final artifacts: the Philosopher's Stone, the Sword of Flame, and the aptly-named Finishing Blow Sword. The group immediately finds the Philosopher's Stone without any difficulty, granting Murasaki every spell except for Mereb's useless repertoire. Her new revival spell comes in handy as Yoshihiko and Danjo repeatedly blunder into the dungeon's many deathtraps. After a stay at an inn operated by the witch from Spirited Away, the party manages to collect the remaining two items and encounter the Demon King.
| 35 | 12 | Transliteration: "Dai Shinden" (Japanese: 大神殿) | 24 December 2016 |
Yoshihiko attempts to summon the seven chosen orb owners, but nothing happens — Hotoke explains that none of them are able to participate in the final battle against the Demon King due to conflicting schedules. The party decides they must flee and come back at a time when everyone is available. The Demon Lord nonchalantly allows the group to depart, but not before destroying the Finishing Blow Sword. Yoshihiko, believing it's impossible to defeat the Demon Lord and afraid of dying forever, decides to abandon the adventure. A dark version of Hotoke appears and gives Yoshihiko a choice between three endings to his adventure. The first two mirror the endings of The Dog of Flanders and Neon Genesis Evangelion. The third implies the entire series was a video game played by a modern apartment-dwelling Yoshihiko, who loses to the final boss once and gives up on seeing the end. Normal Hotoke appears and sends Yoshihiko back in time to the beginning of the series to learn the truth of his adventure. Returning to the present, the party once again battles the Demon Lord, but at a great cost.

== Cast ==
- Takayuki Yamada – Yoshihiko (Hero)
- Azusa Okamoto – Hisa (Hero's Sister)
- Shin Takuma – Danjo (Warrior)
- Haruka Kinami – Murasaki (Fighter)
- Tsuyoshi Muro – Mereb (Wizard)
- Jirô Satô – Hotoke (Buddha)
- Kitarô – Teruhiko
- Kôtarô Shiga – Ozaru
- Ryôji Isoyama – Caveman
- Kôji Nomura – Caveman
- Narushi Ikeda – Ninja
- Naomi Shiraishi – Obaba
- Naomi Watanabe – Oshina
- Tomoya Nakamura – Sauda
- Nobue Iketani – Sauda's Mother
- Yûichi Fukuda – Mountain God
- Ken Yasuda – Thief A
- Daisuke Kobayashi – Kojima
- Nana Rokusha – Kirana Village Woman
- Meikyô Yamada – Gantesai
- Kôji Abe – Thief B
- Eiko Koike – Angel
- Takafumi Ozeki – Kappa
- Ikki Sawamura – Thief
- Shin'ya Kaneko – Nakamo
- Hidekazu Nagae – Igaruya
- Hajime Taniguchi – Shimuda
- Arata Furuta – Thief E
- Haruna Uechi – Thief E's Wife
- Takuma Otoo – Thief F
- Shizuka Nakamura – Lienne
- Junpei Takiguchi – Evil Sorcerer
- Takao Toji – Old Man Lienne
- Tanaka Naoki – Sir Morgan
- Shun Oguri – Baquas, the Demon King's gatekeeper (Season 1, ep 10)

== Music ==
The opening to the first series was performed by mihimaru GT, while the closing credits is by TEE. The audio was composed by anime and video game composer Eishi Segawa. A soundtrack CD was bundled with the first series DVD. A new release containing additional tracks from the other seasons was sold separately in 2017.

Yūsha Yoshihiko to Maō no Shiro Original Soundtrack
| No. | Title | Japanese title | Length |
|---|---|---|---|
| 1. | "Hero Yoshihiko Main Theme" | 勇者ヨシヒコメインテーマ | 2:52 |
| 2. | "The Heroes' Battle Begins" | 勇者達の戦いが始まる | 2:29 |
| 3. | "Get Ready" | 準備万端 | 0:41 |
| 4. | "Ancient Scroll" | 古い巻物 | 0:50 |
| 5. | "The Heroes' Plan of Strategy" | 勇者達の作戦計画 | 1:30 |
| 6. | "Fanfare in Honor of the Hero" | 勇者を讃えるファンファーレ | 2:25 |
| 7. | "Buddha's Divine Message" | 仏のお告げ | 1:13 |
| 8. | "Buddha Appears" | 仏現る | 1:09 |
| 9. | " " | ここはヤバイヨ | 1:19 |
| 10. | "The Name is Danjo" | 俺の名はダンジョー | 1:35 |
| 11. | " " | 勇者フニャフニャ | 1:15 |
| 12. | "Bandit" | 盗賊 | 0:59 |
| 13. | " " | まるで朝の連ドラのような日替わりバンパー | 0:21 |
| 14. | " " | 次へ行く感じのバンパー甲 | 0:20 |
| 15. | " " | 次へ行く感じのバンパー乙 | 0:17 |
| 16. | " " | 次へ行く感じのバンパー丙 | 0:16 |
| 17. | " " | 登場のバンパー松 | 0:10 |
| 18. | " " | 登場のバンパー梅 | 0:10 |
| 19. | "Hero Yoshihiko Main Theme · Piano Solo" | 勇者ヨシヒコメインテーマ・ピアノソロ | 1:31 |
| 20. | " " | 井戸を覘くヨシヒコ | 0:45 |
| 21. | "Legendary Weapon" | 伝説の武器 | 0:17 |
| 22. | "Hopeless Desire" | 叶わぬ願い | 1:35 |
| 23. | "Run for the Sake of Lienne!" | リエンの為に走れ! | 1:13 |
| 24. | "Hero Yoshihiko Main Theme · Marimba Performance" | 勇者ヨシヒコメインテーマ・マリンバ演奏 | 1:05 |
| 25. | " " | マナブーの呪文 | 0:40 |
| 26. | "Murasaki's Love" | ムラサキの恋 | 1:29 |
| 27. | "Adorable Murasaki" | かわいいムラサキ | 1:32 |
| 28. | "Ninja Entrance Bumper" | 忍者登場のバンパー | 0:07 |
| 29. | "Bandit Hip Hop" | 盗賊ヒップホップ | 0:58 |
| 30. | "Bandit Tedium" | 盗賊徒然 | 0:37 |
| 31. | " " | 恐怖の驚怖 | 1:11 |
| 32. | " " | アフターでチョチョッと | 1:54 |
| 33. | "Wizard Mereb" | 魔法使いメレブ | 1:03 |
| 34. | "Demon King Galius" | 魔王ガリアス | 2:14 |
| 35. | "The Heroes' Ballad" | 勇者達のバラード | 2:03 |
| 36. | "Minstrel" | 吟遊詩人 | 0:41 |
| 37. | "Minstrel Karaoke" | 吟遊詩人 カラオケ | 0:41 |
| 38. | " " | 渡り廊下 de 魔物倒し隊 | 1:21 |
| 39. | " " | 渡り廊下 de 魔物倒し隊 カラオケ | 1:22 |
| 40. | "You Are My Angel" | 君こそ僕の天使 | 1:46 |
| 41. | "You Are My Angel Karaoke" | 君こそ僕の天使 カラオケ | 1:45 |
