= Sofian El Fani =

Tunisian cinematographer

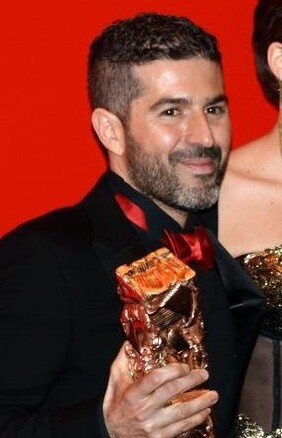
- El Fani in 2015
- Born: 28 January 1974 (age 52)
- Citizenship: Tunisia
- Occupation: Cinematographer

Sofian El Fani (born 28 January 1974) is a Tunisian cinematographer. His credits include Timbuktu, Blue Is the Warmest Colour, It Must Be Heaven, and Black Venus.

== Filmography ==
- Black Venus (2010)
- Blue Is the Warmest Colour (2013)
- Timbuktu (2014)
- It Must Be Heaven (2019)
- Kokuho (2025)

== See also ==
- Cinema of Tunisia
