= Suzuki=Bakudan =

2025 film by Akira Nagai

- Theatrical release poster
- Japanese: 爆弾
- Directed by: Akira Nagai
- Screenplay by: Hiroyuki Yatsu; Masahiro Yamaura
- Based on: Bakudan by Katsuhiro Go
- Produced by: Shota Okada; Yuho Tadano
- Starring: Yuki Yamada; Jiro Sato; Sairi Ito; Shota Sometani; Ryota Bando; Kanichiro; Atsuro Watabe
- Cinematography: Tetsuya Kondo
- Edited by: Suguru Ninomiya
- Music by: Yaffle
- Production company: Aoi Pro.
- Distributed by: Warner Bros. Pictures
- Release date: October 31, 2025 (Japan)
- Running time: 137 minutes
- Country: Japan
- Language: Japanese

Suzuki=Bakudan (Japanese: 爆弾, Hepburn: Bakudan; lit. Bomb) is a 2025 Japanese crime thriller film directed by Akira Nagai and based on Katsuhiro Go's novel of the same name. Starring Yuki Yamada, Jiro Sato, Sairi Ito, Shota Sometani, and Atsuro Watabe.

== Plot ==
A middle-aged man, who calls himself Tagosaku Suzuki, is being interrogated on suspicion of assault. He claims to have psychic abilities and predicted that a bomb would soon explode somewhere in the Tokyo Metropolitan Area. The prediction comes true. He then predicted that three more explosions would occur, one every hour. From this point forward, the police are dragged into Suzuki's game.

== Cast ==
- Yuki Yamada as Ruike
- Jiro Sato as Tagosaku Suzuki
- Sairi Ito as Sara Koda
- Ryota Bando as Taito Yabuki
- Shota Sometani as Isao Todoroki
- Kanichiro as Ise
- Bokuzō Masana as Tsuruku
- Kataoka Sennosuke as Tatsuma Ishikawa
- Seina Nakata as Miu Ishikawa
- Masaya Kato as Yuko Hasebe
- Yui Natsukawa as Asuka Ishikawa
- Atsuro Watabe as Kiyomiya

== Production ==
The original work is Katsuhiro Go's novel of the same title, which took 1st place in Kono Mystery ga Sugoi! (This Mystery is Excellent!) 2023 and 4th place in the Japan Booksellers' Award 2023. Jiro Sato is known for heavily using ad-libs in comedy films directed by Yuichi Fukuda, but he did not use any ad-libs in this work.

== Reception ==
=== Box office ===
The film was released on October 31, 2025, and earned ¥520 million at the box office over the first four days, which included a national holiday on Monday. It ranked second, following Chainsaw Man – The Movie: Reze Arc. The box office revenue reached ¥2.19 billion one month after its release.

=== Critical response ===
Film critic Rui Takeshima praised Jiro Sato's performance, saying, "Tagosaku Suzuki dominated the entire film, much like the Joker played by Heath Ledger in The Dark Knight."

=== Accolades ===
Award	Category	Recipient(s)	Result	Ref.
50th Hochi Film Awards	Best Supporting Actor	Jiro Sato	Won	
38th Nikkan Sports Film Awards	Yūjirō Ishihara Award	Suzuki=Bakudan	Nominated	
38th Nikkan Sports Film Awards	Best Supporting Actor	Jiro Sato	Nominated	
80th Mainichi Film Awards	Best Supporting Performance	Jiro Sato	Won	
80th Mainichi Film Awards	Best Sound Recording	Hiroshi Ishigai	Nominated	
68th Blue Ribbon Awards	Best Film	Suzuki=Bakudan	Nominated	
68th Blue Ribbon Awards	Best Director	Akira Nagai	Nominated	
68th Blue Ribbon Awards	Best Actor	Yuki Yamada	Nominated	
68th Blue Ribbon Awards	Best Supporting Actor	Jiro Sato	Won	
99th Kinema Junpo Awards	Best Supporting Actor	Jiro Sato	Won	
49th Japan Academy Film Prize	Best Film	Suzuki=Bakudan	Nominated	
49th Japan Academy Film Prize	Best Director	Akira Nagai	Nominated	
49th Japan Academy Film Prize	Best Actor	Yuki Yamada	Nominated	
49th Japan Academy Film Prize	Best Supporting Actor	Jiro Sato	Won	
49th Japan Academy Film Prize	Best Screenplay	Masahiro Yamaura and Hiroyuki Yatsu	Nominated	
49th Japan Academy Film Prize	Best Music	Yaffle	Nominated	
49th Japan Academy Film Prize	Best Cinematography	Tetsuya Kondo	Nominated	
49th Japan Academy Film Prize	Best Lighting Direction	Satoshi Mizoguchi	Nominated	
49th Japan Academy Film Prize	Best Art Direction	Ryo Sugimoto and Takuya Okada	Nominated	
49th Japan Academy Film Prize	Best Sound Recording	Hiroshi Ishigai	Nominated	
49th Japan Academy Film Prize	Best Film Editing	Suguru Ninomiya	Nominated	
49th Japan Academy Film Prize	Newcomer of the Year	Ryota Bando	Won	
