= Yoshiko Sakuma =

Japanese actress (born 1939)

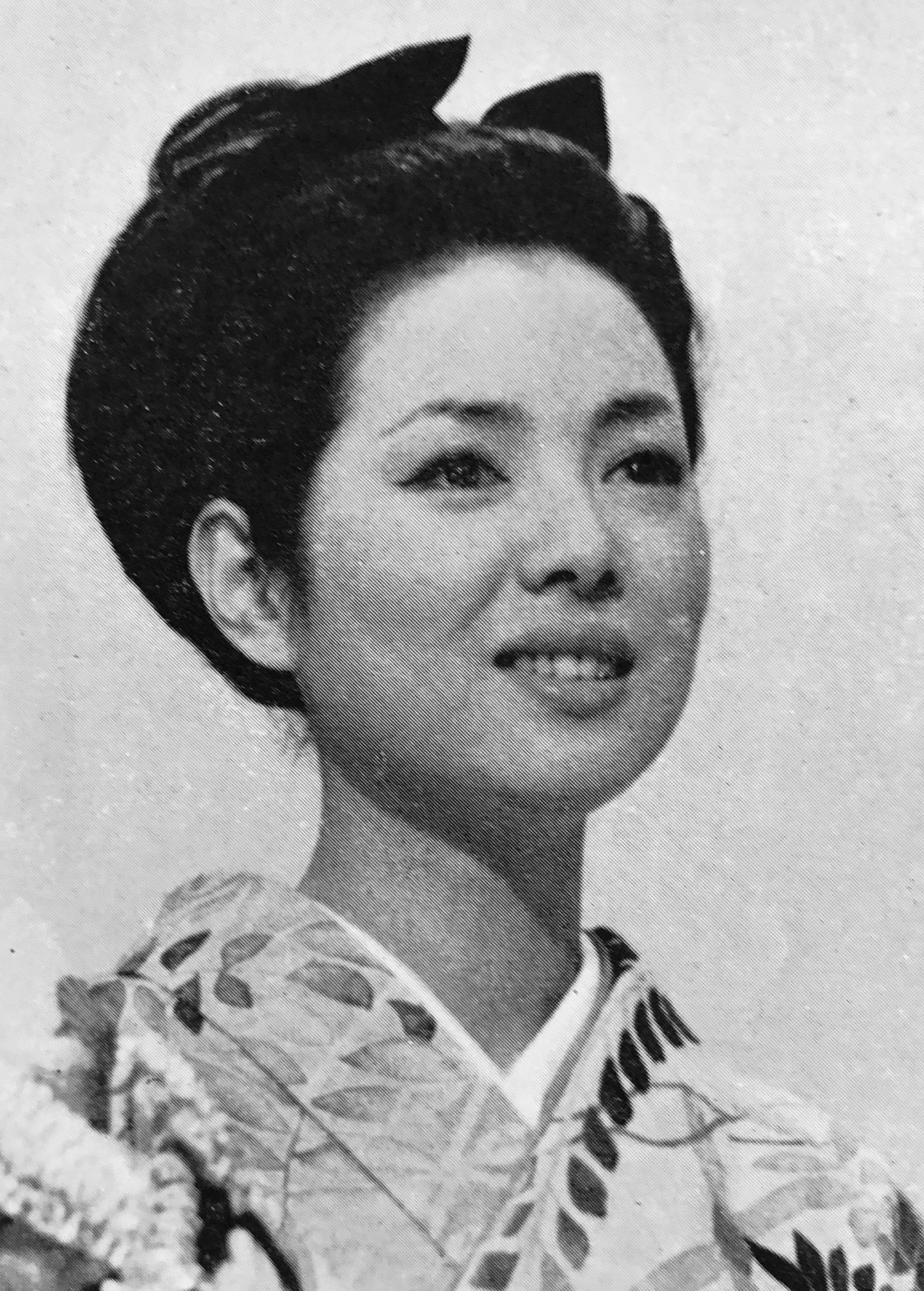
- Sakuma in the January 1965 issue of Movie Pictorial
- Born: 24 February 1939 (age 87); Tokyo, Japan
- Occupation: Actress
- Years active: 1958–present
- Spouse: Mikijirō Hira (m. 1970; div. 1984)
- Children: Takehiro Hira

Yoshiko Sakuma (佐久間 良子, Sakuma Yoshiko; born 24 February 1939) is a Japanese actress. Her son is actor Takehiro Hira.

In 1957, Sakuma was scouted and signed her contract with Toei film company. Following year she made her film debut with Utsukushiki Shimai no Monogatari Modaeru Soshun. In 1970, she married actor Mikijirō Hira but divorced in 1984. Sakuma landed lead role in the 1981 Taiga drama Onna Taikōki.

== Selected filmography ==
=== Film ===
- Kiiroi Fudo (1961)
- The G-Men of the Pacific (1962)
- Gang vs. G-Men (1962) as Akiko Mizuno
- Gang 6 (1963)
- Gobanchō yūgirirō (1963)
- Theater of Life: Hishakaku (1963) as Otoyo & Osumi (dual role)
- Kaoyaku (1965)
- Lake of Teras (1966) as Saku
- Samurai Banners (1969) as Princess Yu
- Chōkōsō no Akebono (1969)
- Men and War Part II (1971)
- Byoinzaka no Kubikukuri no Ie (1979)
- The Makioka Sisters (1983)
- Genji Monogatari: Sennen no Nazo (2012) as Myobu
- Earthquake Bird (2019) as Yamamoto

=== Television ===
- Shin Heike Monogatari (1972) as Taira no Tokuko
- Onna Taikōki (1981) as Nene
- Kōmyō ga Tsuji (2006) as Hōshūin

== Honours ==
- Order of the Rising Sun, 4th Class, Gold Rays with Rosette (2012)
