= Katsuo Nakamura =

Japanese actor (born 1938)

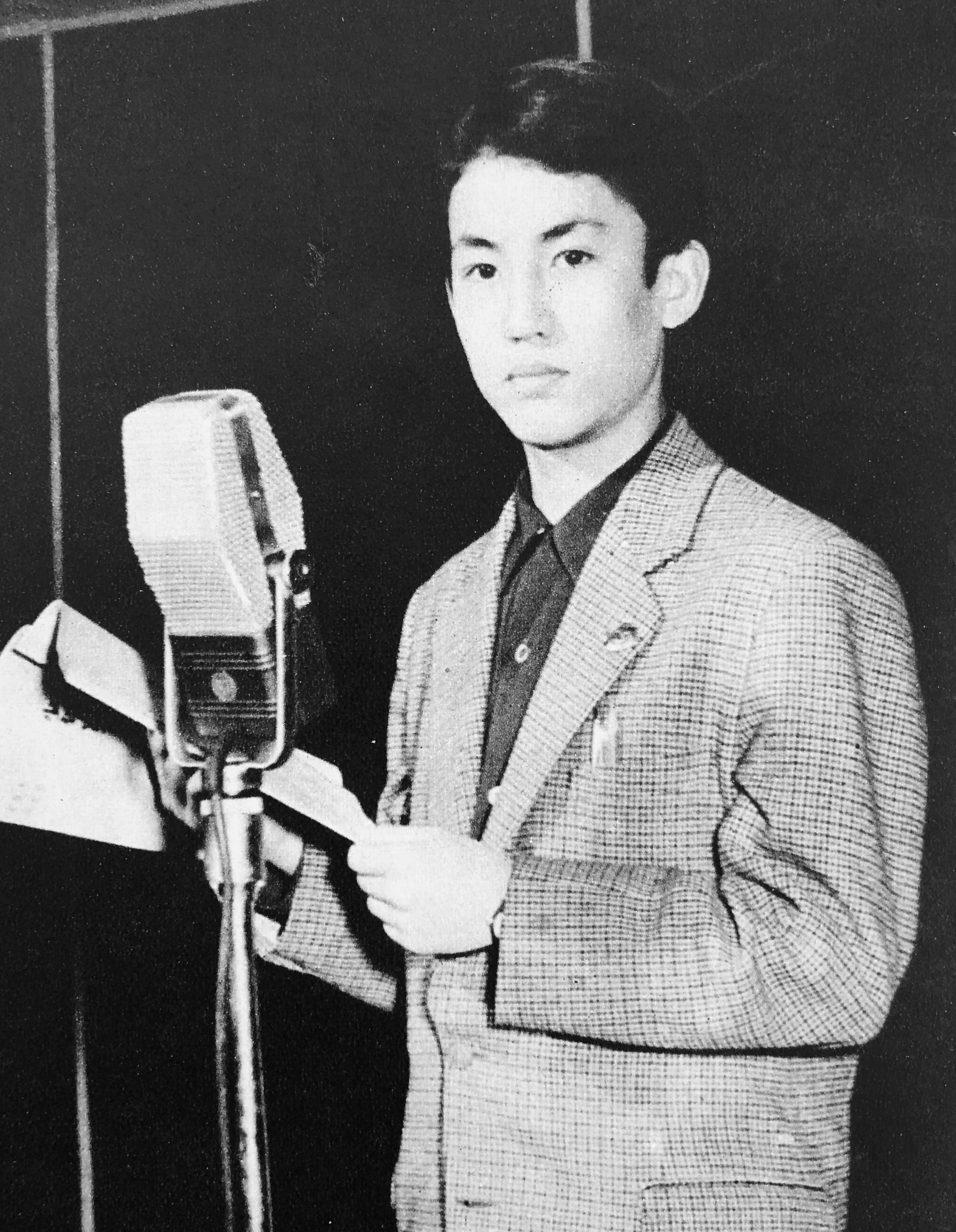
- Nakamura in 1955
- Born: Katsuo Ogawa; April 23, 1938 (age 88); Minami-Aoyama, Tokyo, Empire of Japan
- Occupation: Actor
- Years active: 1955–present
- Spouse: Tsuneko Shibata (m. 1976; div. 1981)
- Father: Nakamura Tokizō III
- Relatives: Yorozuya Kinnosuke (brother); Nakamura Shidō II (nephew)

Katsuo Nakamura (Japanese: 中村嘉葎雄, Hepburn: Nakamura Katsuo; born Katsuo Ogawa; April 23, 1938) is a Japanese actor. Since 1955, he has had a prolific film career, appearing in films such as Masaki Kobayashi's Kwaidan (1964) and Martin Scorsese's Silence (2016). The younger brother of Kinnosuke Nakamura, Nakamura is also a former Kabuki actor. He won the award for best supporting actor at the 5th Japan Academy Prize and at the 6th Hochi Film Award for Kagero-za, Buriki no kunsho, and Shikake-nin Baian.

== Filmography ==
- Furisode Kenpo (1955) - debut
- Stepbrothers (1957)
- Akō Rōshi (1961)
- Kwaidan (1964) - (segment "Hoichi the Earless")
- The Pleasures of the Flesh (1965)
- Lake of Tears (1966)
- Samurai Banners (1969)
- Shinsengumi (1969)
- Bakumatsu (1970)
- Demons (1971)
- Zatoichi in Desperation (1972)
- Shin Hissatsu Shiokinin (1977)
- Nichiren (1979)
- Tempyō no Iraka (1980)
- Love Letter (1981)
- Buriki no kunsho (1981)
- Kagero-za (1981)
- Shikake-nin Baian (1981)
- Ōoku (1983)
- Station to Heaven (1984)
- Shinran: Path to Purity (1987)
- Tokyo: The Last Megalopolis (1988)
- Whiteout (2000)
- Godzilla vs. Megaguirus (2000)
- Warm Water Under a Red Bridge (2001)
- Godzilla, Mothra and King Ghidorah: Giant Monsters All-Out Attack (2001)
- Godzilla Against Mechagodzilla (2002)
- Samurai Resurrection (2003)
- Be with You (2004)
- Steamboy (2004)
- Dororo (2007)
- Sad Vacation (2007)
- 20th Century Boys (2008)
- Snow Prince (2009)
- Ask This of Rikyu (2013)
- Kakekomi (2015)
- Silence (2016)
