= Nikkan Sports Film Award for Best Director =

Annual Japanese film award

- Awarded for: Best Performance by a Director
- Country: Japan
- Presented by: Nikkan Sports
- First award: 1988
- Website: www.nikkansports.com/entertainment/award/ns-cinema/top-ns-cinema.html

The Nikkan Sports Film Award for Best Director is an award given at the Nikkan Sports Film Award.

== List of winners ==
No.	Year	Director	Film(s)
1	1988	Kazuo Kuroki	Tomorrow
2	1989	Shohei Imamura	Black Rain
3	1990	Seijirō Kōyama	Shiroi Te
4	1991	Yoji Yamada	My Sons
5	1992	Yōichi Higashi	The River with No Bridge
6	1993	Yoichi Sai	All Under the Moon
7	1994	Kinji Fukasaku	Crest of Betrayal
8	1995	Kaneto Shindo	A Last Note
9	1996	Takeshi Kitano	Kids Return
10	1997	Hayao Miyazaki	Princess Mononoke
11	1998	Hideyuki Hirayama	Begging for Love
12	1999	Kinji Fukasaku	The Geisha House
13	2000	Junji Sakamoto	New Battles Without Honor and Humanity; Face
14	2001	Isao Yukisada	Go
15	2002	Yoji Yamada	The Twilight Samurai
16	2003	Takeshi Kitano	Zatōichi
17	2004	Kazuo Kuroki	The Face of Jizo; Utsukushii Natsu Kirishima
18	2005	Isshin Inudo	Touch; House of Himiko
19	2006	Kichitaro Negishi	What the Snow Brings
20	2007	Masayuki Suo	I Just Didn't Do It
21	2008	Yōjirō Takita	Departures
22	2009	Miwa Nishikawa	Dear Doctor
23	2010	Takashi Miike	13 Assassins
24	2011	Kaneto Shindo	Postcard
25	2012	Kenji Uchida	Key of Life
26	2013	Hirokazu Koreeda	Like Father, Like Son
27	2014	Takashi Yamazaki	The Eternal Zero; Stand by Me Doraemon
28	2015	Masato Harada	The Emperor in August
29	2016	Makoto Shinkai	Your Name
30	2017	Yuya Ishii	The Tokyo Night Sky Is Always the Densest Shade of Blue
31	2018	Kazuya Shiraishi	The Blood of Wolves; Sunny / 32; Dare To Stop Us
32	2019	Tetsuya Mariko	Miyamoto
33	2020	Kiyoshi Kurosawa	Wife of a Spy
34	2021	Keisuke Yoshida	Intolerance
35	2022	Lee Sang-il	Wandering
36	2023	Yuya Ishii	The Moon; Masked Hearts
37	2024	Jun'ichi Yasuda	A Samurai in Time
38	2025	Lee Sang-il	Kokuho
