= Shikake-nin Baian =

1981 film

- Film poster
- Directed by: Yasuo Furuhata
- Screenplay by: Seiko Shimura; Yōzō Tanaka
- Based on: Shikake-nin Baian by Shōtarō Ikenami
- Produced by: Masao Sato
- Starring: Yorozuya Kinnosuke; Katsuo Nakamura; Akira Nakao; Juzo Itami
- Cinematography: Yoshio Miyajima
- Edited by: Isamu Ichida
- Music by: Shigeki Watanabe
- Production company: Toei Company
- Distributed by: Toei Company
- Release date: April 11, 1981 (Japan)
- Running time: 100 minutes
- Country: Japan
- Language: Japanese

Shikake-nin Baian (Japanese: 仕掛人梅安), also known as Baian the Assassin, is a 1981 Japanese jidaigeki film directed by Yasuo Furuhata. The film was adapted from the novel by Shōtarō Ikenami. It stars Kinnosuke Yorozuya as Dr. Fujieda Baian, an acupuncturist who moonlights as an assassin.

== Cast ==
- Kinnosuke Yorozuya as Fujieda Baian
- Katsuo Nakamura as Hikosan
- Takayuki Godai as Kosugi
- Akira Nakao as Abe
- Shinsuke Mikimoto as Tsuchiya Mondo
- Mayumi Ogawa as Osono
- Kimie Shingyoji as Osaki
- Junko Miyashita as Omon
- Juzo Itami as Omiya Sahei
- Susumu Fujita as Otowaya Hanemon

== Awards and nominations ==
5th Japan Academy Prize

- Won: Best Supporting Actor - Katsuo Nakamura
- Nominated: Best Director - Yasuo Furuhata

6th Hochi Film Award

- Won: Best Supporting Actor - Katsuo Nakamura
