= Mainichi Film Awards =

Series of annual film awards

- Awarded for: Excellence in film making
- Country: Japan
- Presented by: Mainichi Shimbun
- First award: 1946; 80 years ago
- Website: mainichi.jp/enta/cinema/mfa/

The Mainichi Film Awards (毎日映画コンクール, Mainichi Eiga Konkūru) are a series of annual film awards, sponsored by Mainichi Shimbun (毎日新聞), one of the largest newspaper companies in Japan, since 1946. It is the first film festival in Japan.

== History ==
The origins of the contest date back to 1935, when the Mainichi Shimbun organized a festival then called Zen Nihon eiga konkūru (全日本映画コンク ー ル^{?} ), which was interrupted during World War II. The current form of the Mainichi Film Awards officially came into being in 1946.

== Awards ==
- Mainichi Film Award for Best Film
- Mainichi Film Award for Excellence Film
- Mainichi Film Award for Best Director
- Mainichi Film Award for Best Cinematography
- Mainichi Film Award for Best Art Direction
- Mainichi Film Award for Best Animation Film
- Mainichi Film Award for Best Lead Performance (2024–)
- Mainichi Film Award for Best Supporting Performance (2024–)
- Mainichi Film Award for Best Actor (1947–2023)
- Mainichi Film Award for Best Supporting Actor (1947–2023)
- Mainichi Film Award for Best Actress (1947–2023)
- Mainichi Film Award for Best Supporting Actress (1947–2023)
- Mainichi Film Award for Best Film Score
- Mainichi Film Award for Foreign Film Best One Award
- Mainichi Film Award for Best Screenplay
- Mainichi Film Award for Best Music
- Mainichi Film Award for Best Sound Recording
- Ōfuji Noburō Award
- Kinuyo Tanaka Award
