= Brave Hearts: Umizaru =

- Directed by: Eiichirō Hasumi
- Written by: Yasushi Fukuda
- Based on: Umizaru by Shūhō Satō
- Starring: Hideaki Itō; Ai Kato; Ryuta Sato; Shohei Miura; Saburō Tokitō; Riisa Naka; Hiroyuki Hirayama; Tsuyoshi Ihara
- Cinematography: Tomoo Ezaki
- Edited by: Hiroshi Matsuo
- Music by: Naoki Satō
- Production company: Robot
- Distributed by: Toho
- Release date: July 13, 2012 (Japan)
- Running time: 116 minutes
- Country: Japan
- Language: Japanese

Brave Hearts: Umizaru (BRAVE HEARTS 海猿) is a 2012 Japanese action drama film directed by Eiichirō Hasumi and based on the manga series Umizaru.

It is the fourth and final feature film/installment in the live action Umizaru series, acting as a sequel to films Umizaru (2004), Limit of Love: Umizaru (2006) and Umizaru 3: The Last Message (2010), and the 2005 TV series Umizaru: Evolution.

== Synopsis ==
Two years have passed since the oil platform accident in The Last Message. Heroic rescue diver Daisuke Senzaki (Hideaki Itō) and longtime teammate Yoshioka have since transferred to the front line as members of a special rescue unit. While Senzaki and his wife Kanna are about to welcome a second child into their happy family, Yoshioka has also found love with flight attendant Mika. One day, Mika's Tokyo-bound flight catches mechanical trouble, putting over 300 souls in danger as the pilots attempt an emergency landing on water. Despite the plane landing safely, Senzaki, Yoshioka and their fellow sea monkeys only have 20 minutes to get everyone out before it sinks into water.

Despite the difficulties, the rescue becomes successful after the captain was rescued underwater using an oxygen mask and cutting equipment. Under the rescue of Yoshioka, Mika also succeeds in a thrilling escape before the tail sank, but Yoshioka herself did not have time to escape and sank to the bottom of Tokyo Bay at a depth of 60 meters with the tail, and formal diving rescue can only dive at most At 45 meters, just when everyone thought that Yoshioka would die with sadness and despair, Senzaki still maintained his unwillingness to give up and asked for permission to dive deeply, and the respirator of the plane was used to ensure breathing.

Eventually, Senzaki and the seniors rescue Yoshioka, echoing the theme at the beginning of the movies and show as the rescue in cheers and exclamations. It turns out that saving people requires more than superb technology and calm judgment, and important thing to maintain the heart of saving lives that never gives up. In the end, Mika cries and tells Yoshioka about the divorce of her parents and the hidden past of her own divorce, so she rejected Yoshioka's proposal. As Yoshioka promises to give Mika a happy life, the movie comes to an end. As the credits roll, the film interspersed with past movies, Japanese dramas and footage according to tradition, which is very worth watching.

== Cast ==
- Hideaki Itō as Daisuke Senzaki
- Ai Kato as Kanna Senzaki (née Izawa)
- Ryuta Sato as Yoshioka Tetsuya
- Shohei Miura
- Saburō Tokitō
- Riisa Naka as Mika
- Hiroyuki Hirayama
- Tsuyoshi Ihara
- Motoki Fukami
- Tomomi Miyashita
- Chinami Suzuki
- Yumi Kobayashi

== Reception ==
Brave Hearts: Umizaru grossed a total of 7.33 billion yen at the Japanese box office in 2012, making it the top-grossing film there.
