= Umizaru 3: The Last Message =

2010 film by Eiichirō Hasumi

- Poster
- Directed by: Eiichirō Hasumi
- Screenplay by: Yasushi Fukuda
- Based on: Umizaru by Shūhō Satō
- Produced by: Hirotsugu Usui
- Starring: Hideaki Itō; Ai Kato; Ryūta Satō
- Cinematography: Akira Sako
- Edited by: Hiroshi Matsuo
- Music by: Naoki Satō
- Release date: September 18, 2010 (Japan)
- Running time: 129 minutes
- Country: Japan
- Language: Japanese

Umizaru 3: The Last Message (Japanese: THE LAST MESSAGE 海猿) is a 2010 Japanese action drama film directed by Eiichirō Hasumi. It is the third feature-length film of the Umizaru projects, following the events of the 11 episode drama series Umizaru Evolution (2005), Umizaru (2004) and Limit of Love: Umizaru (2006). The film is the last of the 3-part film and television project. The project is adapted from the popular 12 Shogakukan manga books Umizaru written by Yōichi Komori (小森陽一) and illustrated by Shūhō Satō from 1998 to 2001. It was released in Japan on 18 September 2010.

== Plot ==
Senzaki and Izawa, who both have a son, are about to experience their first wedding anniversary. Upon preparations, Senzakihen receives a call regarding a natural gas exploration platform "Nigaya" which has unexpectedly gone haywire. In response to the coming strong typhoon, the original task was to escort the exploration platform designer Mr. Sakuragi into the platform and shut down the exploration platform in order to survive the typhoon. However, the damage to the exploration platform gradually becomes severe In order to prevent the bottom fire from spreading to the uppermost natural gas cylinder and causing a devastating explosion, Sakuragi activates the layered valve for isolation, leaving him stranded on the platform with two unevacuated personnel, as well as Senzaki and a rookie diver Hattori. After a series of accidents, Senzaki and Hattori sink the exploration platform in order to prevent a cylinder explosion. Senzaki's leg becomes injured during the mission and cannot escape as the exploration platform keeps sinking. After the typhoon, all the marine security officers dispatch to the rescue. As Izawa watches everything at home with their son, she realizes what Senzaki had arranged for the wedding anniversary, as she listens to the last message in the sea monkey doll...

== Cast ==
- Hideaki Itō as Daisuke Senzaki
- Ai Kato as Kanna Izawa
- Ryuta Sato as Yoshioka Tetsuya

== Reception ==
It was number-one at the Japanese box office for six straight weeks.
