= Umizaru (film) =

2004 Japanese film by Eiichiro Hasumi

- Theatrical release poster
- Directed by: Eiichiro Hasumi
- Written by: Manga:: Shūhō Satō; Screenplay: Fukada Yasushi
- Produced by: Shūji Abe
- Starring: Hideaki Itō; Kato Ai; Ken Kaito; Karina; Atsushi Itō; Miki Ryosuke; Kyoko; Jun Kunimura
- Music by: Sato Naoki
- Release date: 2004
- Running time: 120 minutes
- Language: Japanese

Umizaru (海猿) is a 2004 Japanese action drama film directed by Eiichiro Hasumi. It is the first feature-length film of the Umizaru projects, preceding the 2005 11-episode Fuji Television and Kyodo Television drama series Umizaru Evolution and followed by the 2006 film Limit of Love: Umizaru. The film is the first of the three-part film and television project. The project is adapted from the popular 12 Shogakukan manga books Umizaru written by Yōichi Komori (小森陽一) and illustrated by Shūhō Satō from 1998 to 2001. The film stars Hideaki Itō as Japan Coast Guard (JCG) rescue diver Senzaki Daisuke, and Kato Ai as his love interest Izawa Kanna.

There are also NHK dramas Umizaru (2002) and Umizaru 2 (2003).

Umizaru means "Sea Monkey"; this is a derogatory label slapped on the rescue diver trainees by local townsfolk of the city of Kure due to their excessive and uninhibited behaviour during off-hours.

Journey's "Open Arms" was used in the film as the theme song.

The 2006 movie The Guardian was loosely based on this movie.

== Plot ==
Daisuke Senzaki was originally a diet food salesman. Due to his love of the sea, he joins the Japan Coast Guard. Bored, and in order to be able to work at the forefront, he enters a 50-day training course for at the Japan Coast Guard Academy in Kure, Hiroshima, and officially starts his career. Within those 50 days, Senzaki endures training and hardships with candidates sent from other departments, and became partners with fellow cadet Kudo Hajime, for Senzaki, who has diving qualifications, makes it an easy job for him. But Kudo is a relatively new team member, which causes their partnership to be rather weak and for the duo to excel their worst during the training sessions.

Although Senzaki feels angry from time to time, he understands that as a diver, he must be integrated with his partner. An accident mission to save people kills Kudo and Senzaki, deeply affected by the loss of Kudo, becomes afraid of diving, and nearly decides to quit the Coast Guard. In order to cheer him up, his former instructor deliberately arranges the Mishima Yuji team, which is different compared from his own and are training rivals. As the training at sea grows intense, it brings Senzaki and his newfound team closer to death.

During the training break, Senzaki goes into a drunken disturbance, where he eventually meets Izawa Kanna near the training school and the two begin to fall in love.

== Cast ==
Actor	Role
Hideaki Itō	Senzaki Daisuke
Kato Ai	Izawa Kanna
Ken Kaito	Yuji Mishima
Karina	Nurse Erika Matsubara
Atsushi Itō	Hajime Kudo
Kyoko	Natsuko Nakasako
Jun Kunimura	Admiral Masaki Igarashi
Tatsuya Fuji	Sergeant Minamoto
