= Eiichirō Hasumi =

Japanese film director

- Born: March 29, 1967 (age 58)
- Occupation: Film director

Eiichirō Hasumi (羽住英一郎, Hasumi Eiichirō) is a Japanese film director.

== Filmography ==
=== Film ===
- Umizaru (2004)
- Limit of Love: Umizaru (2006)
- Oppai Volleyball (2008)
- Umizaru 3: The Last Message (2010)
- Wild 7 (2011)
- Brave Hearts: Umizaru (2012)
- Assassination Classroom
- Mozu (2015)
- Assassination Classroom: Graduation (2016)
- Over Drive (2018)
- The Sun Stands Still (2020)
- Resident Evil: Infinite Darkness (2021)
- Re/Member (2022)
- Resident Evil: Death Island (2023)
- Re/Member 2 (2025)

=== TV series ===
- Antique Bakery (2001)
- Umizaru Evolution (2005)
