= Japan Coast Guard Academy =

Higher education institution in Hiroshima Prefecture, Japan

Coordinates: 34°14′46.2″N 132°31′37.6″E

- 海上保安大学校
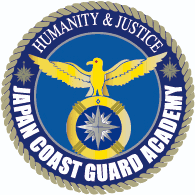
- Former names: Kure Maritime Safety University
- Motto: 正義仁愛 (Seigi Jin'ai)
- Motto in English: Humanity & Justice
- Type: University-level Service academy
- Established: 1951
- Affiliations: NIAD-QE, GRIPS
- Principal: Masaki Kasai
- Students: Approximately 240 cadets
- Location: 5-1 Wakaba-cho, Kure-shi, Hiroshima 737-8512, JAPAN
- Campus: Suburban
- Nickname: Hodai
- Website: www.jcga.ac.jp

Japan Coast Guard Academy in Hiroshima

The Japan Coast Guard Academy (海上保安大学校, Kaijō Ho'an Daigakkō) (JCGA) is a university-level service academy established within the Ministry of Land, Infrastructure, Transport and Tourism for the purpose of developing Coast Guard Officers. It is located in Kure, Hiroshima prefecture.

The cadets and officer candidates learn specialized knowledge on international maritime law, naval police theory, maritime traffic policy, in a rigorous 4 year and 9 month curriculum unique to the Academy.

Graduates of JCGA go out into the fleet as junior officers, alternatively working at land-based offices and Coast Guard vessels as they advance in their careers.

== Charter ==
The purpose of the JCGA is stipulated in Article 255 of the Ministry of Land, Infrastructure, Transport and Tourism Organization Ordinance reads as follows:

The Maritime Security College carries out education, training, and maritime security work to equip the personnel of the Maritime Security Agency with the knowledge and skills necessary to carry out their duties as officers. It is in charge of conducting education and training to acquire the specialized knowledge or special skills necessary for their training.

— 国土交通省組織規則, https://elaws.e-gov.go.jp

== Admissions ==
Cadets are typically selected from recent graduates of Japanese civilian senior high schools who have completed twelve years of formal schooling. Applicants must pass the recruitment examination, equivalent level as entrance examination required for a public university, but unlike a regular university, students who enter JCGA become cadets serving in the Japan Coast Guard. The applicant must meet the requirements for becoming an officer in the Coast Guard, such as age and Japanese nationality, which differ from the requirements for general university applicants. The cost of tuition is paid by the Japanese government and both cadets and officer candidates receive a stipend as civil servants (as of 2024, about ¥160,000 per month for cadets and ¥190,000 per month for officer candidates), as with cadets at the National Defense Academy of Japan, National Defense Medical College, and the United States Coast Guard Academy.

In 2021, JCGA began to recruit university graduates as officer candidates. Unlike the United States Coast Guard, officer candidates attend a "Primary Officer Candidates Course" for a year, and then enroll into "Officer Candidates Course"

Approximately 60 cadets and 30 officer candidates are accepted by JCGA every year. The total population of the JCGA is about 220, of which 11% are female as of 2020.

The National Institution for Academic Degrees and Quality Enhancement of Higher Education, an Independent Administrative Institution affiliated with the Ministry of Education, Culture, Sports, Science and Technology (MEXT) has recognised the courses and awards the graduates of the academy degrees (Bachelor of Science in Coast Guard Operations and law Enforcement to JCGA graduates uniquely) on request. As the Academy is not an MEXT-recognised university, it cannot offer its own degrees.

== Academics ==
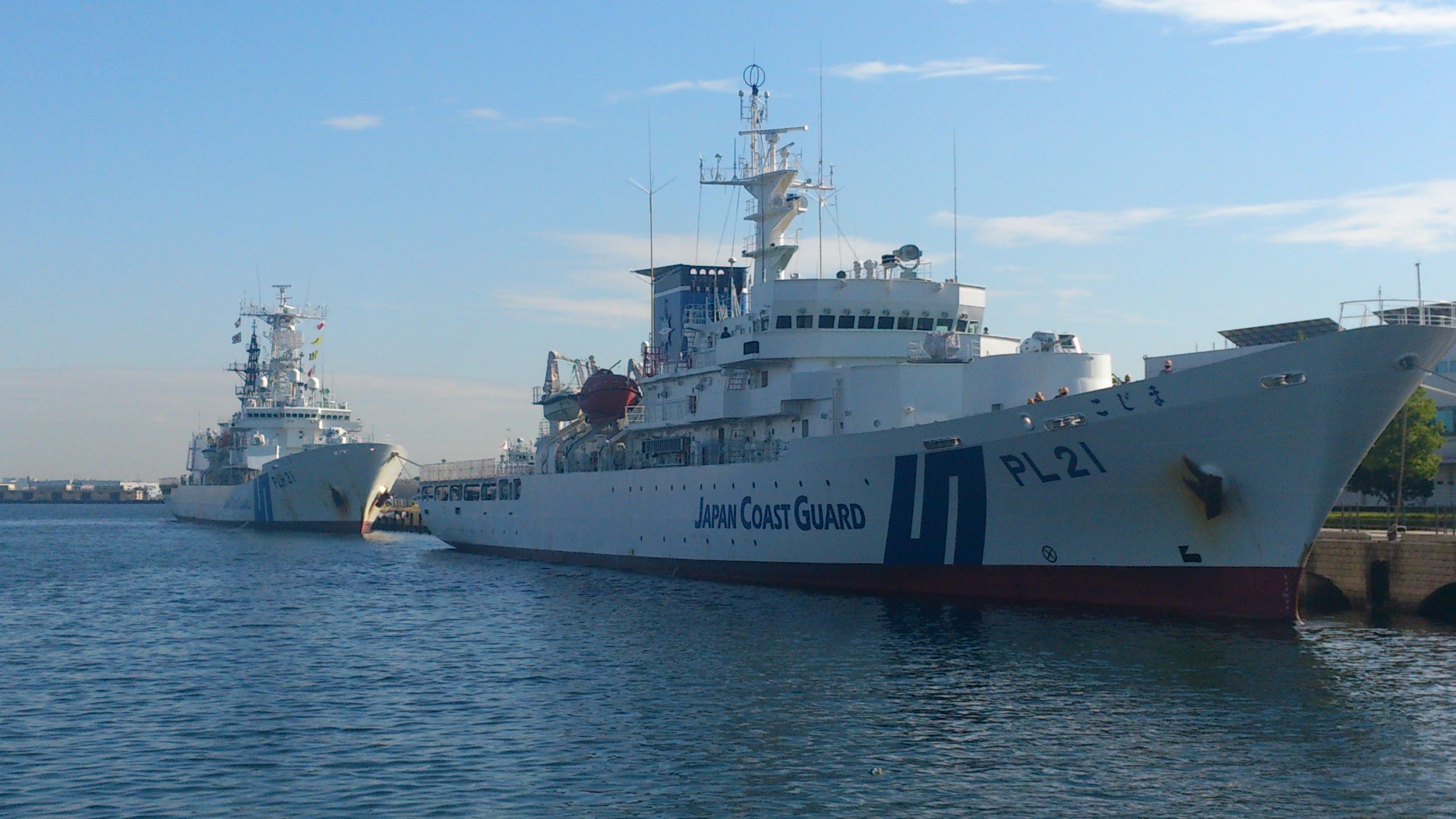
JCGA Training Ship Kojima (PL-21)

Cadets study basic education subjects including English, maritime law, physics, and political science in the first and second years, and begin taking specialized subjects in navigation, engine, and information and communications majors in the second half of the second year. Courses in subjects such as bridge resource management, business management, information science, international law, leadership, meteorology, oceanography, and languages such as Chinese, Korean, and Russian are offered as electives. Upon graduation or completion of training, both cadets and officer candidates will be commissioned as Coast Guard Officer 3rd Grade. Several domestic voyages are required for graduation or completion, before around the world international voyages and a 3 month deployment following completion of studies aboard the training ship JCG Kojima (PL-21) (replaced by JCG Itsukushima (PL-23) in 2024). In 2011, courses in international business were added to improve language skills and the cadets' ability to respond to international incidents.

The JCGA participates in exchanges with foreign coast guard organizations such as the United States Coast Guard Academy, Canadian Coast Guard College, Korea Maritime and Ocean University, and the Philippines, Malaysia, Sri Lanka, and other counterparts.

In response to increased Grey-zone challenges affecting many of Japan's Indo-Pacific neighbors, JCGA introduced the Maritime Safety and Security Policy Program in 2015, a master’s degree program for junior coast guard officers from Japan and other Asian coast guard agencies in international law, international relations, maritime police policy, and other relevant subjects through the National Graduate Institute for Policy Studies. Along with international students from other Indo-Pacific countries, students learn how to deal with various issues that arise at sea, and have the opportunity to acquire professional knowledge and analytical skills.

== Campus ==
The JCGA is located in the Wakaba-cho neighborhood of Kure, Hiroshima, on land previously belonging to the Kure Naval Arsenal. The present campus was opened in 1952 after JCGA's founding a year earlier in Tokyo to provide officers for the newly established Maritime Safety Agency following the dissolution of the Imperial Japanese Navy by Allied forces.

About 8,000 books from the former Imperial Japanese Naval War College, have been preserved at the JCGA library including tactical books from the early 19th century, diplomatic documents from the time of World War I, and books previously owned by Admiral Heihachiro Togo.

The Japan Coast Guard Museum is also located on the JCGA campus, containing approximately 1,000 items, such as photographs of historic patrol boats, ship models, and artifacts from the Battle of Amami-Oshima (2001).

== In popular culture ==
JCGA has been featured in several Japanese film and television shows including Keisuke Kinoshita's Big Joys, Small Sorrows (1986), and the Umizaru franchise latter based on the popular manga by Shūhō Satō.

== See also ==
- Japan Coast Guard
- Service academy
- Big Joys, Small Sorrows
- Umizaru
