= Mainichi Film Award for Best Supporting Actor =

Annual Japanese film awards

- Awarded for: Best supporting actor of the year
- Country: Japan
- First award: 1952

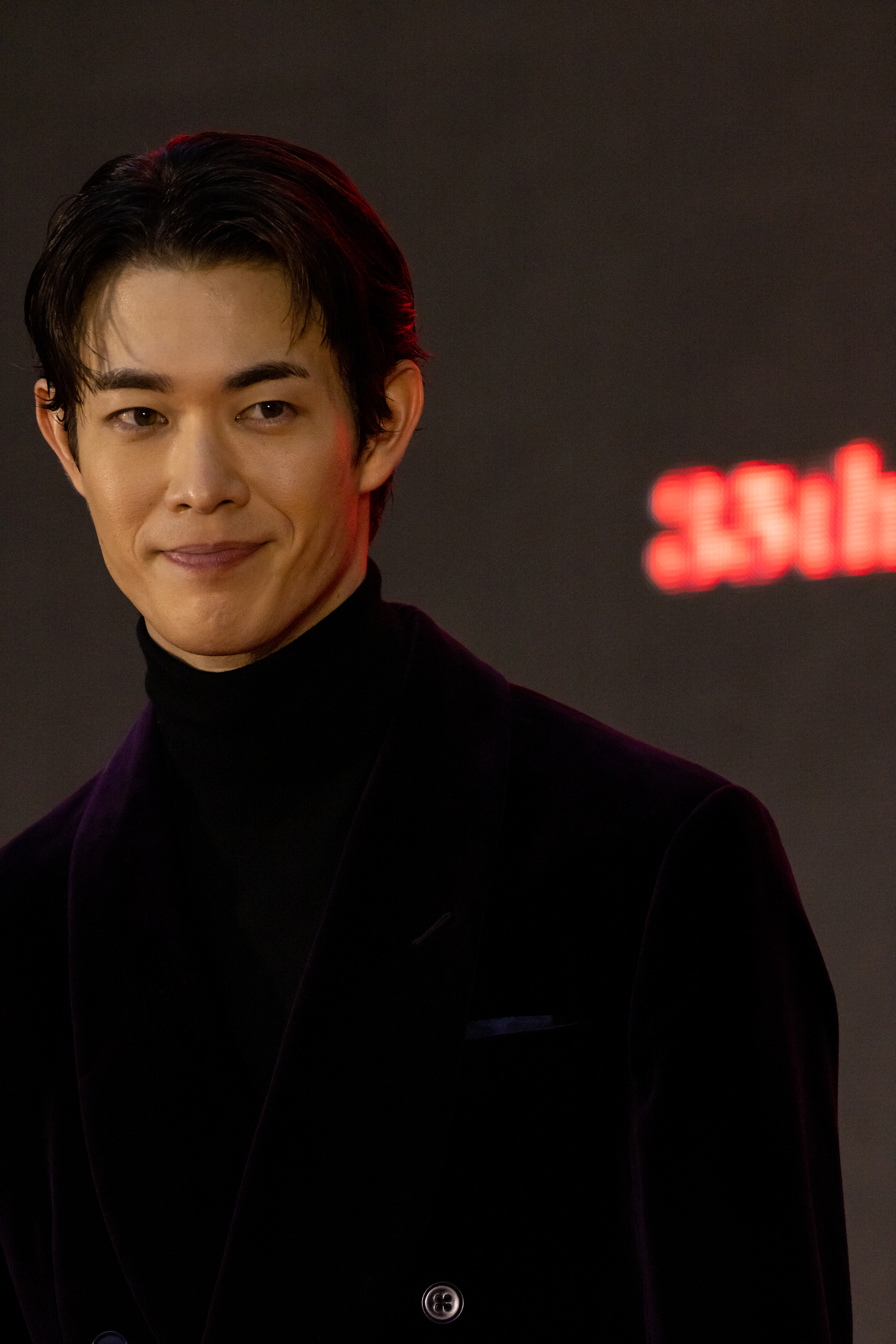
Miyazawa Hio from "Egoist" at Red Carpet of the Tokyo International Film Festival 2022

The Mainichi Film Award for Best Supporting Actor is a film award given at the Mainichi Film Awards.

== Award winners ==
Year	Film	Actor
1952	Mother; Kettō Kagiya no Tsuji	Daisuke Katō
1953	Entotsu no Mieru Basho	Hiroshi Akutagawa
1954	Seven Samurai	Seiji Miyaguchi
1955	Koko ni Izumi Ari	Keiju Kobayashi
1956	Yoru no Kawa; Aya ni Itoshiki; Yūyake Gumo	Eijirō Tōno
1957	Kichigai Buraku; Seigiha; The Lower Depths	Kōji Mitsui
1958	Enjō; Iwashigumo	Nakamura Ganjirō II
1959	Ningen no Kabe	Jukichi Uno
1960	The Bad Sleep Well; Her Brother	Masayuki Mori
1961	Hadakakko; Shiiku	Rentarō Mikuni
1962	An Autumn Afternoon; Foundry Town	Eijirō Tōno
1963	Twin Sisters of Kyoto	Hiroyuki Nagato
1964	Kōge	Norihei Miki
1965	A Fugitive from the Past	Junzaburo Ban
1966	Onna no Naka ni Iru Tanin	Tatsuya Mihashi
1967	Wakamonotachi; Kimi ga Seishun no Toki; Hi no Ataru Sakamichi	Kei Yamamoto
1968	Profound Desires of the Gods	Kanjūrō Arashi
1969	Waga Koi Waga Uta; Shirikurae Magoichi; Shinsengumi	Katsuo Nakamura
1970	Where Spring Comes Late	Chishū Ryū
1971-1982	N/A	N/A
1983	Merry Christmas, Mr. Lawrence	Takeshi Kitano
1984	Mahjong hōrōki	Kaku Takashina
1985	Ran; Tampopo	Hisashi Igawa
1986	Big Joys, Small Sorrows; Itoshi no Tea-Patpat	Hitoshi Ueki
1987	Tora-san Goes North	Toshiro Mifune
1988	A Taxing Woman's Return; Bakayaro! I'm Plenty Mad; Honno 5g	Yasuo Daichi
1989	Dotsuitarunen; Shucchō; It's Easier than Kissing; Yumemi Dōri no Hitobito	Yoshio Harada
1990	Roningai; Ready to Shoot	Renji Ishibashi
1991	Edo Jō Tairan; Kojika Monogatari; Nowhere Man	Tomokazu Miura
1992	Minbo; Okoge	Takehiro Murata
1993	Bōkyō	Ken Tanaka
1994	Shūdan Sasen	Atsuo Nakamura
1995	Kura	Hiroki Matsukata
1996	A Class to Remember	Hidetaka Yoshioka
1997	The Eel; Tettō Musashinosen	Tomorowo Taguchi
1998	Hana-bi; Inu, Hashiru Dog Race	Ren Osugi
1999	Atsumono	Yoshi Oida
2000	Dokuritsu Shōnen Gassōdan; Suri	Teruyuki Kagawa
2001	Misuzu; Brother; Sora no Ana	Susumu Terajima
2002	Travail; Ichi the Killer; Kuroe; Oboreru Hito	Shinya Tsukamoto
2003	Hana; Doppelganger; Zatoichi	Akira Emoto
2004	Blood and Bones; Kono Yono Soto e Club Chūshingun	Joe Odagiri
2005	A Stranger of Mine	Kisuke Yamashita
2006	Love and Honor; Nezu no Ban	Takashi Sasano
2007	Talk Talk Talk	Yutaka Matsushige
2008	After School; Climber's High; Jersey no Futari	Masato Sakai
2009	Ōsaka Hamlet	Ittoku Kishibe
2010	13 Assassins	Goro Inagaki
2011	Cold Fish	Denden
2012	Beyond Outrage	Ryo Kase
2013	The Devil's Path	Pierre Taki
2014	Wood Job!	Hideaki Itō
2015	Nagasaki: Memories of My Son	Kenichi Katō
2016	Creepy	Teruyuki Kagawa
2017	The Third Murder	Kōji Yakusho
2018	Killing	Shinya Tsukamoto
2019	Sea of Revival	Ken Yoshizawa
2020	The Voice of Sin	Shōhei Uno
2021	Under the Open Sky	Taiga Nakano
2022	A Man	Masataka Kubota
2023	Egoist	Hio Miyazawa
