= Ai Kato =

Japanese actress (born 1982)

- 加藤 あい
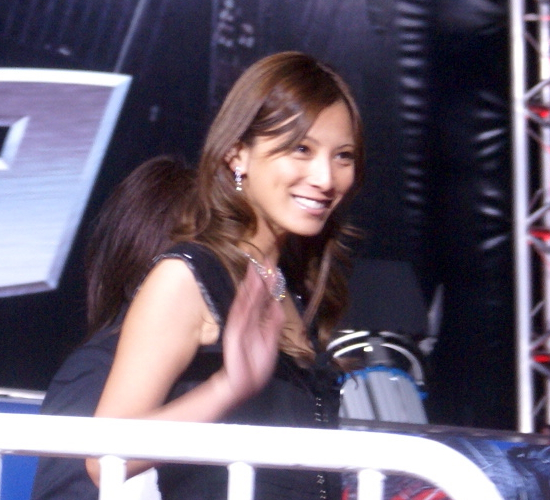
- Kato in 2007
- Born: December 12, 1982 (age 43); Kiyosu, Aichi, Japan
- Education: Horikoshi High School
- Occupation: Actress
- Years active: 1997–present
- Agent: Ever Green Entertainment
- Spouse: Unknown (m. 2013)
- Children: 3
- Website: www.someday.bz/kato-ai/

Ai Kato (加藤 あい(かとう あい), Katō Ai; born December 12, 1982) is a Japanese actress.

== Personal life ==
On November 14, 2013, Kato announced that she had married a non-celebrity who is seven years her senior. They registered their marriage on November 22. On September 14, 2015, she revealed that she gave birth to her first child, a daughter, in the United States. On June 13, 2018, she announced the birth of her second child, and in 2022, she gave birth to her third child.

== Filmography ==
=== Movies ===
- Pokémon 3: The Movie (2000)
- Umizaru (2004)
- Limit of Love: Umizaru (2006)
- Umizaru 3: The Last Message (2010)
- Umizaru 4: Brave Hearts (2012)
- Another (2012)
- Team Batista Final ~ Kerberos no Shozo (2014)

=== TV dramas ===
- Gift (1997)
- P.A. Private Actress (1998)
- Sweet Devil (1998)
- Seija no Kōshin (1998)
- Abunai Hokago (1999)
- Best Friend (1999)
- Naniwa Kinyudo 5 (2000)
- Ikebukuro West Gate Park (2000)
- Manatsu no Merry Christmas (2000)
- Tengoku ni Ichiban Chikai Otoko 2 (2001)
- Kizudarake no Love Song (2001)
- My Little Chef (2002)
- Yan Papa (2002)
- Kimi ga Omoide ni Naru Mae ni (2004)
- Fuufu (2004)
- Otouto (2004)
- Umizaru Evolution (2005)
- Hiroshima Showa 20 nen 8 Gatsu Muika (2005)
- Haken no Hinkaku (2007)
- Dream Again (2007)
- Scrap Teacher (2008)
- Kami no Shizuku (2009)
- Majo Saiban (2009)
- Keiji no Genba 2 (2009)
- Hataraku Gon! (2009)
- General Rouge no Gaisen (2010)
- Unubore Deka (2010)
- Face Maker (2010)
- Brutus no Shinzo (2011)
- Suna no Utsuwa 2011 (2011)
- Hikaru Hekiga (2011)
- Boku to Star no 99 Nichi (2011)
- Taira no Kiyomori (2012)
- Seinaru Kaibutsutachi (2012)
- Strawberry Night (2012)
- Mikeneko Holmes no Suiri (2012)
- Higashino Keigo Mysteries (2012)
- Cheap Flight (2013)
- Kyokuhoku Rhapsody (2013)
- Gochisousan (2013)
- Umi no Ue no Shinryojo (2013)
- Dr. DMAT (2014)
- Kizoku Tantei± (2017 – 2 episodes)

== Awards ==
Year	Award	Category	Work(s)	Result	Ref.
2001	25th Elan d'or Awards	Newcomer of the Year	Herself	Won	
