= Limit of Love: Umizaru =

Limit of Love 海猿
- Poster for the film.
- Directed by: Eiichiro Hasumi
- Written by: Shūhō Satō (Manga); Yasushi Fukada (Screenplay)
- Starring: Hideaki Itō; Ai Kato; Nene Otsuka; Mitsuru Fukikoshi; Reina Asami; Ryosuke Miki; Ken Ishiguro; Saburō Tokitō
- Music by: Naoki Satō
- Release date: May 6, 2006 (Japan)
- Running time: 112 minutes
- Country: Japan
- Language: Japanese

Limit of Love: Umizaru (Japanese: Limit of Love 海猿), also known as Umizaru 2: Test of Trust is a 2006 Japanese action drama film directed by Eiichiro Hasumi. It is the second feature-length film and third of the Umizaru projects, set after the film Umizaru and the 11-episode drama series Umizaru Evolution. The film stars Hideaki Itō as Japan Coast Guard (JCG) rescue diver Daisuke Senzaki, and Ai Kato as his love interest Kanna Izawa. It is the second of the three-part film and television project, which is adapted from the popular manga series Umizaru by Shūhō Satō.

The film was the second-highest-grossing film ever at the Japanese box office, trailing only Bayside Shakedown 2. The film's opening weekend gross was 4.42 times that of its predecessor, Umizaru. Hideaki Itō, the male lead, has a Divemaster license awarded by PADI Japan, a professional diving qualification. The theme song is "Precious" by vocalist Yuna Ito.

== Plot ==
Following the decommissioning of the patrol vessel Nagare (ながれ), Daisuke Senzaki, now a Japan Coast Guard (JCG) rescue diver, is posted to the 10th Region Mobile Rescue Unit, based at Kagoshima Air Station. A plane crashes in the stormy seas, where Senzaki battles the elements to keep two victims alive, as he struggles to keep everyone on a piece of wreckage serving as a makeshift lifeboat. Senzaki can only hold onto an adult male, while a young boy struggles to hang on by himself. He manages to keep the boy alive, but the man sacrifices himself and drowns so the boy can survive. He soon becomes plagued with guilt and self-doubt due to this episode, as he had pledged not to let any more victims die.

Senzaki's girlfriend Kanna Izawa takes time off her job and travels a long distance by car to see him. As the couple check into a hotel, Izawa locks herself out of her room, forcing her to spring a handmade wedding dress surprise on Senzaki, accompanied by a fashion designer. Izawa had hoped to finalize their marriage plans. Senzaki, still traumatised, is not prepared for marital commitments, and his reluctance drives a wedge between the two. Izawa leaves heartbroken in spite of the best efforts of Senzaki's buddy, Tetsuya Yoshioka, to mediate.

En route to a routine training exercise, news arrives that a passenger ferry, the Clover, has run aground with four hours left to evacuate. Senzaki and Yoshioka are among the first divers on site, deployed by helicopter. Their stark prognosis of the ship's fate is compounded by revelations from Coast Guard crisis command: 620 passengers, 195 fuel-laden vehicles, with limited time to escape. Senzaki's rescue efforts take a dramatic turn when he discovers his girlfriend Izawa on board. In a fateful decision, the disheartened Izawa had chosen to take the ferry instead of driving home. Senzaki tells Izawa to abandon her belongings and proceed to the lifeboats, including the handmade wedding dress. As the couple part ways, Izawa asks for Senzaki's reassurance that they will meet again afterwards.

While attending to an injured pregnant staff member, Megumi Honma, Senzaki becomes separated from the rest of his team as Homma informs him of a faster route to the escape hatches. The shortcut brings them to the vehicle deck of the ferry, where they meet an irritable passenger, Shinichi Ebihara, tending to his precious Ferrari. A sudden lurch wreaks havoc on the vehicles and ignites the petroleum, causing a massive explosion. The fire forces the four scrambling for cover on another deck where they become disoriented and trapped with no idea where to go. Ebihara eventually suffers an injury to his left thigh. They radio for help and find a duct in the room bears the markings "68-4T".

The frantic JCG crisis command centre tries to locate the room which the four are trapped in, as Shimokawa and other officers pore over the schematics of the ship, desperate for some feasible route of escape. Shimokawa decides they have no choice but to swim underwater to attempt an escape into another level of the ship. Despite protests of the others, Shimokawa insists that his route is the only option left. Senzaki and Yoshioka bring the pregnant Honma and injured Ebihara through the perilous underwater swim, The four eventually complete the swim into another level which was yet unflooded and remain there.

As the last of the passengers have been evacuated, Senzaki, Yoshioka and the 2 victims are the only ones unaccounted for, still cut off from radio contact with no help. Shimokawa, since his promotion to shore command position from his days with Senzaki on the Nagare, is forced to grapple with a tough decision: to continue the recovery of the missing four with other rescue divers or withdrawing all teams to avoid suffering casualties in a likely fruitless rescue attempt. Further explosions and casualties force Shimokawa to withdraw other divers; a decision met with great disdain and frustration from the on-site divers who comply with reluctance.

Now safe on shore, Izawa notices the return of the rescue divers from the sinking ship and worriedly inquires the whereabouts of her boyfriend. Her worst fears are confirmed when JCG officials release the names of the missing divers and passengers, stating that rescue efforts have been suspended due to extreme danger. She watches helplessly as the inferno rages on the Clover. Meanwhile, the JCG command struggles to determine their next steps, awaiting radio contact from the trapped survivors.

== Cast ==
Actor	Role
Hideaki Itō	Daisuke Senzaki
Ai Kato	Kanna Izawa
Ryuta Sato	Yoshioka Tetsuya
Nene Otsuka	Megumi Honma
Mitsuru Fukikoshi	Shinichi Ebihara
Reina Asami	Shiori Otobe
Ryosuke Miki	Sadayuki Katsuragi
Ken Ishiguro	Isamu Kitao
Saburō Tokitō	Iwao Shimokawa

== Sequels ==
- Umizaru 3: The Last Message, released September 18, 2010.
- Brave Hearts: Umizaru, released July 13, 2012.
