= Umizaru =

Japanese manga series

- Cover of the first volume

海猿
- Genre: Drama, romance
- Manga
- Written by: Shūhō Satō
- Published by: Shogakukan
- Magazine: Weekly Young Sunday
- Original run: 1998 – 2001
- Volumes: 12
- Live-action television film
- Directed by: Yoshiko Hoshida
- Written by: Yasuo Hasegawa
- Original network: NHK
- Released: July 13, 2002
- Runtime: 45 minutes
- Live-action television film

Umizaru 2
- Directed by: Yoshiko Hoshida
- Written by: Yasuo Hasegawa
- Original network: NHK
- Released: August 18, 2003
- Runtime: 45 minutes
- Television drama

Umizaru Evolution
- Directed by: Eiichirō Hasumi; Yoshinori Kobayashi
- Produced by: Shizuo Sekiguchi; Shintarō Suzuki; Fumi Hashimoto
- Written by: Yasushi Fukuda
- Music by: Naoki Satō
- Studio: Fuji TV / Kyodo
- Original network: Fuji TV
- Original run: July 5, 2005 – September 13, 2005
- Episodes: 11
- Related works
- Umizaru; Limit of Love: Umizaru; Umizaru 3: The Last Message; Brave Hearts: Umizaru

Umizaru (Japanese: 海猿; lit. 'Sea Monkeys') is a Japanese manga series written and illustrated by Shūhō Satō. It was serialized by Shogakukan in Weekly Young Sunday from 1998 to 2001. Yōichi Komori is credited with the original idea for the series, and he also did the research to make the series more authentic.

The series focuses on Daisuke Senzaki, an officer in the Japan Coast Guard, and tells the stories of shipwreck rescues and other incidents where the coast guard plays a role. The plotlines in the series were drawn from incidents and accidents which actually happened while the manga was being written (similar to the "ripped from the headlines" tagline used by various Law & Order series).

The manga has been adapted into two NHK high-definition specials, four films, and one drama series.

== Media ==
=== Adaptations ===
==== Umizaru Evolution (2005) ====
Title: 海猿

Title (romaji): Umizaru

Also known as: Umizaru Evolution / Sea Monkey

Format: Renzoku

Genre: Action, human drama, romance

Episodes: 11

Viewership ratings: 13.1

Broadcast network: Fuji TV

Broadcast period: July 5–September 13, 2005

Air time: Tuesday 21:00

Theme song: Ocean by B'z

Synopsis:

The story is about the friendship, love, and training of 14 Japan Coast Guard officers becoming rescue divers. Rescue divers are on the front line in rescue activities in heavy seas. It is a profession that 1% of all Coast Guard officers qualify for. To receive that qualification, they undergo 50 days of training in rescue activities. The young Coast Guard officers, including Daisuke Senzaki, take on this training. The story concentrates on the lives of the divers after having passed their examination.

Cast:

- Ito Hideaki as Senzaki Daisuke
- Kato Ai as Izawa Kanna
- Nakamura Toru as Ikezawa Masaki
- Sato Ryuta as Yoshioka Tetsuya
- Sato Hitomi as Komori Chika
- Suzuki Kazuma as Fuyushiba Kosuke
- Natsuyagi Isao as Katsuda Kotaro
- Iida Kisuke as Miike Kenji
- Sakamoto Akira as Iwamatsu Daigo
- Hirayama Usuke as Yamaji Takumi
- Miyake Hiroki as Bessho Kenjiroh
- Usuda Asami as Hoshino Rei
- Ichiki Ami Ono Yui
- Okunuki Kaoru Ono Eriko
- Yoshimoto Miyoko as Ikezawa Naoko
- Masuoka Toru as Tsuda Shinpei
- Ibu Masato as Higo Daisaku
- Tokito Saburo as Shimokawa Iwao
- Sakamoto Makoto as Nagashima Kenta
- Ito Atsushi (ep1)
- Karina (ep1)
- Aoki Munetaka (ep1)
- Namioka Kazuki as Tokunaga Masaya (ep4)
- Fuse Hiroshi
- Suzuki Honoka
- Tanaka Tetsushi
- Yashiba Toshihiro
- Abe Ryohei

Production Credits:

- Screenwriter: Fukuda Yasushi
- Producer: Sekiguchi Shizuo (関口静夫), Suzuki Shintaro (鈴木伸太郎), Hashimoto Hasumi (橋本芙美)
- Director: Hasumi Eiichiro (羽住英一郎), Kobayashi Yoshinori, Usui Hirotsugu
- Music: Sato Naoki
