= Bengoshi no Kuzu =

Japanese manga and television series

- First tankōbon volume cover, featuring Motohito Kuzu

弁護士のくず
- Genre: Legal comedy
- Manga
- Written by: Hideo Iura
- Published by: Shogakukan
- Magazine: Big Comic Original
- Original run: August 5, 2003 – June 20, 2014
- Volumes: 21
- Series titles
- 1. Bengoshi no Kuzu (2003–2010, 10 volumes); 2. Bengoshi no Kuzu Dai-2 Shin (2010–2014, 11 volumes)
- Television drama
- Directed by: Imai Natsuki; Sakai Masahiro; Takemura Kentaro; Morishima Masaya
- Original network: TBS
- Original run: April 13, 2006 – June 29, 2006
- Episodes: 12
- icon

Bengoshi no Kuzu (弁護士のくず; lit. 'Scum of Lawyers') is a Japanese manga series written and illustrated by Hideo Iura. It started in Shogakukan's seinen manga magazine Big Comic Original in August 2003. In 2010, the manga was re-titled Bengoshi no Kuzu Dai-2 Shin, and continued until June 2014. The overall series' chapters were collected in 21 tankōbon volumes. The series follows Mami Takeda, a new lawyer, and her partnership with fellow attorney Motohito Kuzu, as they deal with challenging court cases.

A 12-episode television drama adaptation was broadcast on TBS from April to June 2006.

In 2007, Bengoshi no Kuzu won the 52nd Shogakukan Manga Award in the general category.

== Characters ==
Motohito Kuzu (九頭 元人, Kuzu Motohito)
Portrayed by: Etsushi Toyokawa
Mami Takeda (武田 真実, Takeda Mami)
Portrayed by: Hideaki Itō
Makoto Shiraishi (白石 誠, Shiraishi Makoto)
Portrayed by: Soichiro Kitamura
Kōhei Katō (加藤 公平, Katō Kōhei) / Tetsuko Katō (加藤 徹子, Katō Tetsuko) (drama)
Portrayed by: Reiko Takashima
Yūk Omata (小俣 夕花, Omata Yūka)
Portrayed by: Aki Hoshino
Yūjirō Kunimitsu (国光 裕次郎, Kunimitsu Yūjirō)
Portrayed by: Fuyuki Moto

== Media ==
=== Manga ===
Written and illustrated by Hideo Iura, Bengoshi no Kuzu started in Shogakukan's seinen manga magazine Big Comic Original on August 5, 2003. (Note: It started in the magazine's 16th issue of 2003, released on August 5 of that same year.) The manga reached 99 chapters on June 5, 2010, and starting on July 5 of that same year, it changed its title to Bengoshi no Kuzu Dai-2 Shin (弁護士のくず 第二審). The series finished on June 20, 2014. Shogakukan collected the overall series' chapters in 21 tankōbon volumes; the first part was collected in ten volumes, released from July 30, 2004, to January 29, 2010, and the second part was collected in eleven volumes, released from December 25, 2010, to August 29, 2014.

==== Copyright infringement lawsuit ====
In February 2008, Tokyo lawyer Masatoshi Uchida alleged that Iura had plagiarized a novel that he wrote, and petitioned the Tokyo District Court to ban sales of Big Comic Original. In August 2010, the Intellectual Property High Court ruled out in favour of Iura and Shogakukan, stating that Uchida's work is not a novel, but "a document that clearly describes social events that were widely reported at the time", and that the manga is "merely based on these real-life events, and there is no copyright infringement."

=== Drama ===
A 12-episode television drama adaptation was broadcast on TBS from April 13 to June 29, 2006.

== Reception ==
In 2007, the series won the 52nd Shogakukan Manga Award in the general category.

Etsushi Toyokawa and Hideaki Itō received the Best Leading Actor and Best Supporting Actor awards, respectively, at the 49th Television Drama Academy Award in 2006.
