= Hideaki Itō =

Japanese actor (born 1975)

Hideaki Ito
- 伊藤 英明
- Born: August 3, 1975 (age 51); Sasebo, Nagasaki Prefecture, Japan
- Occupation: Actor
- Years active: 1997–present
- Agent: ID4 Management (2024–present)
- Website: Official profile

Hideaki Ito (伊藤 英明 (Itō Hideaki), born August 3, 1975) is a Japanese actor known for his leading roles in both television dramas and films. He gained widespread recognition through the Umizaru film series which became a major commercial success. Following this, he expanded his range with more diverse roles, including performances in Takashi Miike’s Sukiyaki Western Django, Lesson of the Evil, and the 2025 Netflix original series Last Samurai Standing, where he played crazed former samurai Bukotsu Kanjiya.

== Early and Personal Life ==
Ito was born in Sasebo, Nagasaki Prefecture, and raised in Gifu, Gifu Prefecture. He grew up in a family of four, with a father who was a former member of the Japan Self-Defense Forces and later worked in logistics, and a mother who previously worked as a bus tour guide. He has one younger sister.

As a child, Ito was diagnosed with acute pyelonephritis and spent a significant part of his early years in and out of hospitals. During his hospitalization, he witnessed the death of a friend in the shared ward, an experience that left a lasting impression on him. Due to chronic illness, he was only able to attend about three years of elementary school in total and struggled to integrate into his classes. His lunch was prepared with reduced salt and diluted with hot water due to dietary restrictions.

Ito underwent a tonsillectomy in sixth grade, which marked a turning point in his health. His condition improved, and he eventually returned his physical disability certificate. These early experiences with illness and mortality shaped his outlook on life, instilling a sense of urgency to live fully, take on challenges, and avoid regrets. He has stated that he believes "life is not about success or failure until it's over," and that he prefers to regret trying rather than not trying at all.

In October 2014, Ito married a woman eight years his junior who was previously a company employee. In public statements, he described her as someone he deeply respected and admired for her kindness and thoughtfulness. Their wedding ceremonies were held both in Gifu Prefecture, his hometown, and on the island of Mallorca, Spain. Initially planning only a traditional Shinto ceremony with close family, they later decided to hold a second ceremony abroad in response to his wife's wish to wear a Western-style wedding dress.

The couple has two children: a son born in 2015 and a daughter born in 2019. In interviews, Ito has shared that becoming a father has brought about a significant shift in his lifestyle and values, helping him reconnect with a more grounded version of himself. He also cited his desire to spend more time with his children as a major reason for considering overseas relocation.

Ito is known for his deep connection to his hometown and often returns to Gifu for local events and charity work. He has acquired licenses as both a certified pyrotechnician (fireworks technician) and a horse owner in Japanese racing. In 2024, he was appointed the face of a regional promotional campaign for Gifu.

== Career ==
Ito began his entertainment career in 1993 when he was awarded runner-up in the 6th annual Junon Superboy Contest, a talent competition hosted by a popular Japanese magazine. In 1994, he moved from Gifu to Tokyo and made his commercial debut opposite Yuko Tanaka in a high-profile TV ad for Suntory Old whisky. However, his initial experience in the industry was marked by discomfort. His agency at the time strictly managed his appearance and dialect, creating a manufactured persona that clashed with his desire to remain authentic. Feeling constrained, he left the agency in 1995 and temporarily withdrew from the entertainment industry.

For the next two years, Ito worked in various labor-intensive jobs, including construction and demolition. He deliberately avoided nightlife jobs despite their higher pay, stating he didn't want to "become someone else’s version of himself." In 1997, he was scouted by staff from A-Team, leading to his return to acting with the television drama Dessan on Nippon TV.

Although his appearance was brief, Ito gained public attention for his role in the 1999 film Himitsu, starring Ryoko Hirosue. His striking presence in the film marked the beginning of his recognition as a serious actor.

In 2000, Ito landed his first lead role in a television series, playing dual characters in the sci-fi drama Yasha. That same year, he starred in the film Blister!, which earned him the Best New Actor Award at the Takasaki Film Festival. His reputation continued to rise with his performance as Maeda Toshinaga in the 2002 NHK historical drama Toshiie to matsu.

His breakthrough came in 2004 when he starred in the action film Umizaru, playing a Japan Coast Guard diver. The film’s success led to a series of sequels, including Limit of Love: Umizaru (2006), The Last Message: Umizaru (2010), and Brave Hearts: Umizaru (2012), which all topped the domestic box office in their respective release years. The popularity of the series established Ito as a mainstream action star. His performance in the 2006 drama Bengoshi no Kuzu earned him the Best Supporting Actor Award at the 49th Television Drama Academy Awards.

In 2007, he starred in Takashi Miike’s Sukiyaki Western Django, which was entered into competition at the 64th Venice International Film Festival. Ito continued to take on diverse roles in the 2010s. In 2012, he played a psychopathic schoolteacher in Lesson of the Evil, marking his first major antagonist role and expanding his acting range. In 2014, he starred in Wood Job! as a forestry worker. His performance earned him the Best Supporting Actor Award at both the 38th Japan Academy Film Prize and the 69th Mainichi Film Awards.

In the 2020s, Ito returned to television in a lead role in the TBS drama Byoshitsu de Nembutsu o Tonaenaide Kudasai (2020), after a 12-year absence from Friday-night dramas. The same year, he joined the Kamen Rider franchise, portraying Kamen Rider Eden in the film Kamen Rider Zero-One the Movie: Real×Time. In 2022, after 25 years with A-Team, he moved to Granpapa Production, a company formerly associated with actor Masahiko Tsugawa. In July 2024, he established his own agency, ID4 Management., and began managing his career independently.

During the production of Tokyo Vice, Ito developed a close friendship with American actor Ansel Elgort. He invited Elgort to experience a traditional Japanese sauna and also welcomed him to his family home in Gifu. Ito has frequently spoken of his admiration for filmmaker Michael Mann, and expressed interest in working on an international project under Mann’s direction.

== Filmography ==
=== Film ===
Year	Title	Role	Notes	Ref.
1996	Kiss Me			
1997	Deborah, the Rival			
1999	Himitsu	Haruki Soma		
2000	Pyrokinesis	Kazuki Tada		
2000	Blister!	Yuji	Lead role	
2001	Love Song	Matsuoka		
2001	The Princess Blade	Takashi		
2001	Onmyoji	Minamoto no Hiromasa		
2003	Onmyoji 2	Minamoto no Hiromasa		
2003	When the Last Sword Is Drawn	Tokugawa Yoshinobu		
2004	Umizaru	Daisuke Senzaki	Lead role	
2005	A Heart Full of Love	Hiroshi Suzutani	Lead role	
2006	Limit of Love: Umizaru	Daisuke Senzaki	Lead role	
2007	Sukiyaki Western Django	Gunslinger	Lead role	
2008	252: Signal of Life	Yuji Shinohara	Lead role	
2009	Kamui Gaiden	Fudo		
2010	The Last Message: Umizaru	Daisuke Senzaki	Lead role	
2011	Andalusia: Revenge of the Goddess	Makoto Kotari		
2012	Brave Hearts: Umizaru	Daisuke Senzaki	Lead role	
2012	Lesson of the Evil	Seiji Hasumi	Lead role	
2014	Wood Job!	Yoki Iida		
2014	Over Your Dead Body	Jun Suzuki		
2014	God Tongue: Kiss Patience Championship	Dr. Ito	Cameo	
2016	Terra Formars	Koichi Komachi	Lead role	
2017	March Comes in Like a Lion	Masamune Gotō		
2017	March Goes Out Like a Lamb	Masamune Gotō		
2017	Memoirs of a Murderer	Takashi Makimura	Lead role	
2020	Kamen Rider Zero-One the Movie: Real×Time	Es / Kamen Rider Eden		
2020	The Doorman	Leo	American film	
2021	Baragaki: Unbroken Samurai	Serizawa Kamo		
2022	Kappei	Kappei	Lead role	
2023	The Legend & Butterfly	Sadachika Fukutomi		
2023	Knuckle Girl	Haruki Nikaido		
2024	Previously Saved Version	Naoki		
2025	#I Will Tell the Truth	Hair salon owner		
2026	Ryuji	Nitta		
2027	Border	Yasuhiko Kuwabara	Lead role	

=== Television ===
Year	Title	Role	Notes	Ref.
1997	Dessin	Unknown		
1997	Bayside Shakedown: Year-End Special Alert	Seiji Aihara	Television film	
2000	Please Give Me Love	Chūya Tsukimitsu		
2000	Yasha	Arisue Sei / Amamiya Rin	Lead role	
2001	Emergency Room 24 Hours	Junpei Yabe	Season 2	
2002	Toshiie and Matsu	Maeda Toshinaga	Taiga drama	
2002	Searching for My Polestar	Kyōichi Sayama	Lead role	
2003	The Great White Tower	Hiroshi Yanagihara		
2005	Kunitori Monogatari	Oda Nobunaga	Television film	
2005	Umizaru Evolution	Daisuke Senzaki	Lead role	
2006	Scum of Lawyers	Masami Takeda		
2007	Akechi Mitsuhide: The Man Not Loved by God	Hori Hidemasa	Television film	
2011	High School Restaurant	Hiroshi Kishino		
2013	It Takes Two	Shunsuke Yamashita	Lead role	
2013	Kindaichi Kōsuke vs Akechi Kogorō	Kogorō Akechi	Lead role; television film	
2014	Kindaichi Kōsuke vs Akechi Kogorō Futatabi	Kogorō Akechi	Lead role; television film	
2015	The Emperor's Cook	Yukichi Tanabe		
2016	My Dangerous Wife	Kōhei Mochizuki	Lead role	
2020	Awaiting Kirin	Saitō Yoshitatsu	Taiga drama	
2020	Prayers in the Emergency Room	Teruyuki Matsumoto	Lead role	
2021	Age of Samurai: Battle for Japan	Date Masamune	Documentary	
2022	Umeko: The Face of Female Education	Sen Tsuda	Television film	
2022	Tokyo Vice	Jin Miyamoto	American television series	
2023	Galápagos	Masaru Torii		
2024	Blue Moment	Motoki Niijima	Episode 8	
2025	Last Samurai Standing	Bukotsu Kanjiya		
2026	Reboot	Masachika Makita		

=== Stage ===
Year	Title	Role	Notes	Ref.
2004	Midsummer Carol: Gama-ōji vs. Zarigani Majin	Muromachi		
2010	Jeanne d'Arc	Charles VII		
2023	A View from the Bridge	Eddie	Lead role	
2024	A Streetcar Named Desire	Stanley Kowalski		

== Awards and nominations ==
Year	Award	Category	Nominated work	Result	Ref.
2001	25th Elan d'or Awards	Newcomer of the Year	Himself	Won	
2015	69th Mainichi Film Awards	Best Supporting Actor	Wood Job!	Won	
2015	38th Japan Academy Film Prize	Best Supporting Actor	Wood Job!	Nominated	

== Bibliography ==
=== Essays ===
- ID4. Koshinsha, July 2001. ISBN 978-4-87761-071-5
- Hideakizm. Gakken, September 2001. ISBN 978-4-05-401486-2

=== Photobooks ===
- Morocco. Photographed by Ken Hanzawa. Kodansha, August 1, 2002. ISBN 978-4-06-330171-7
- Morocco (Deluxe Edition). Photographed by Ken Hanzawa. Kodansha, August 15, 2002. ISBN 978-4-06-330175-5
