= Say Hello to Black Jack =

Japanese manga series

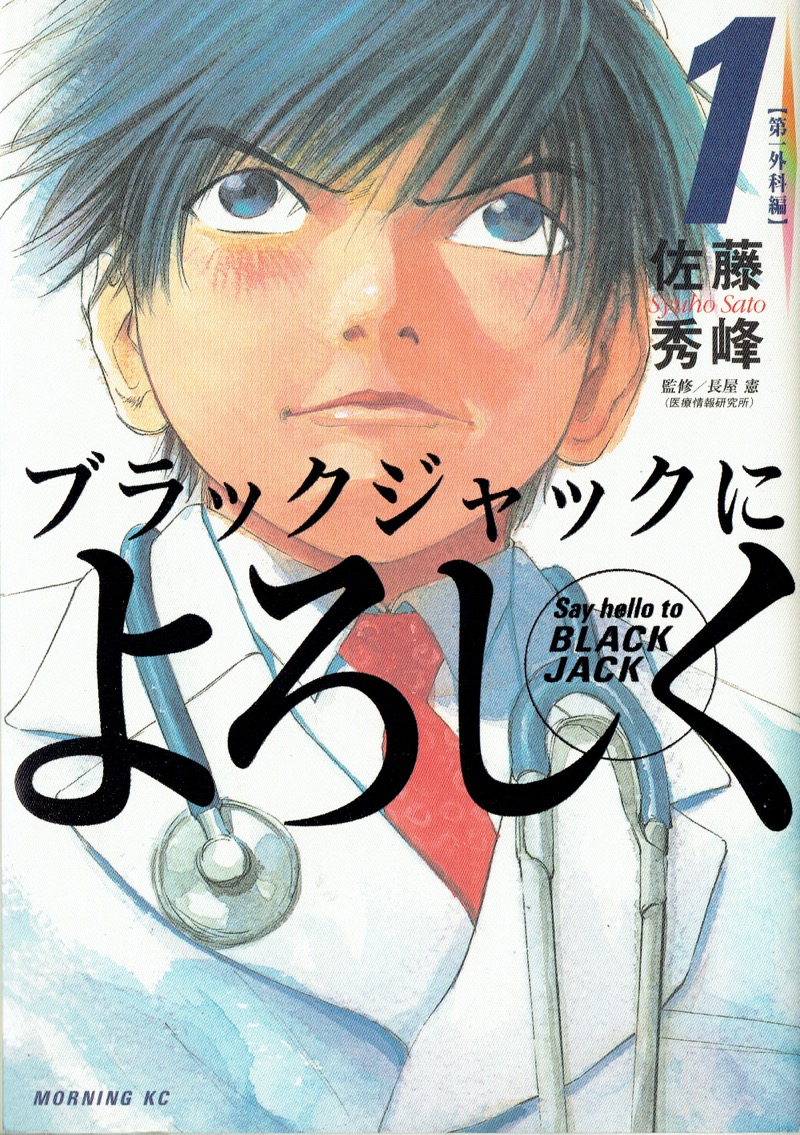
- First tankōbon volume cover, featuring Eijiro Saito

ブラックジャックによろしく (Burakku Jakku ni Yoroshiku)
- Genre: Medical
- Manga
- Written by: Shūhō Satō
- Published by: Kodansha (former)
- Imprint: Morning KC
- Magazine: Morning
- Original run: February 7, 2002 – January 19, 2006
- Volumes: 13
- Television drama
- Directed by: Shunichi Hirano
- Written by: Noriko Goto
- Original network: TBS
- Original run: April 11, 2003 – June 20, 2003
- Episodes: 11
- Manga

Shin Black Jack ni Yoroshiku
- Written by: Shūhō Satō
- Published by: Shogakukan
- Imprint: Big Comics Special
- Magazine: Big Comic Spirits
- Original run: January 22, 2007 – July 16, 2010
- Volumes: 9
- icon

Say Hello to Black Jack (Japanese: ブラックジャックによろしく, Hepburn: Burakku Jakku ni Yoroshiku) is a Japanese manga series written and illustrated by Shūhō Satō. It was serialized in Kodansha's seinen manga magazine Morning from February 2002 to January 2006, with its individual chapters being collected into thirteen volumes. The title is a reference to the manga series Black Jack by Osamu Tezuka.

A sequel, titled Shin Black Jack ni Yoroshiku, was serialized in Shogakukan's Big Comic Spirits magazine from January 2007 to July 2010, with its individual chapters being collected into nine volumes.

By October 2018, the series had 17 million copies in circulation.

== Synopsis ==
Eijiro Saito is a 25-year-old medical graduate now working as an intern at Eiroku University Hospital. While initially enthusiastic about becoming a doctor, Saito's enthusiasm quickly wanes as he navigates Japan's corrupt medical field, facing low wages while working long hours, hospitals selectively choosing which patients to save, and brilliant but often apathetic doctors who care more about earning money and prestige than saving lives. Saito relentlessly pushes back against this corruption through his determination and honesty, despite being constantly gripped with the question of "what does it mean to be a doctor?"

== Media ==
=== Manga ===
Written and illustrated by Shūhō Satō, the series began serialization in Kodansha's seinen manga magazine Morning on February 7, 2002. (Note: Debuted in the magazine's tenth issue of 2002, released on February 7 of that year.) It concluded its serialization on January 19, 2006. (Note: Finished in the magazine's eighth issue of 2006, released on January 19 of that year.) Its individual chapters were collected into thirteen tankōbon volumes, released from June 21, 2002, to January 23, 2006.

A sequel, titled Shin Black Jack ni Yoroshiku (新ブラックジャックによろしく, Shin Burakku Jakku ni Yoroshiku; lit. 'New Say Hello to Black Jack'), also written and illustrated by Satō, began serialization in Shogakukan's Big Comic Spirits magazine on January 22, 2007. It completed its serialization on July 17, 2010. Its individual chapters were collected into nine tankōbon volumes, released from February 28, 2007, to September 30, 2010.

In April 2012, Satō canceled his contract with Kodansha and warned that any remaining copies in bookstores were "illegal publications". In August, Satō began allowing free secondary use of the title, allowing people to "use the original work to create editions in foreign languages, films, applications, anime, and more without any royalty payments", effectively putting the series in public domain. In February 2013, Satō said he has made ¥100 million since allowing secondary use.

In 2010, it was reported that Niconico was working with Satō to translate the series into English. The series became available in English on Amazon Kindle following Satō allowing free secondary use.

=== Other ===
A live-action television drama adaptation, with direction by Shunichi Hirano, scripts by Noriko Goto, and Satoshi Tsumabuki starring as Eijiro Saito, was aired on TBS from April 11 to June 20, 2003.

A stage play adaptation was performed in the Theater Sun Mall in Shinjuku from September 11–16, 2013. It starred Noboru Kaneko and Mami Yamazaki.

In 2013, Anipopo began a crowdfunding campaign to create an anime adaptation produced by Studio Kuma.

== Reception ==
The series received an Excellence Award at the 2002 Japan Media Arts Festival. The series won the grand prize in the 2004 Japan Cartoonists Association Award.

By October 2018, the series had 17 million copies in circulation.
