= Resident Evil: Infinite Darkness =

Japanese-American anime streaming television series

- Series logo

バイオハザード: インフィニット ダークネス (Baiohazādo: Infinitto Dākunesu)
- Genre: Action; Japanese horror; Biopunk; Zombie apocalypse
- Created by: Capcom
- Original net animation
- Directed by: Eiichirō Hasumi
- Produced by: Hiroyasu Shinohara; Kei Miyamoto
- Written by: Eiichirō Hasumi; Shogo Moto
- Music by: Yugo Kanno
- Studio: TMS Entertainment (Note: Production Produce (制作プロデュース)); Quebico (Note: 3DCG Animation (3DCGアニメーション))
- Licensed by: Netflix; Sony Pictures Home Entertainment (home video)
- Released: July 8, 2021
- Runtime: 25–28 minutes
- Episodes: 4

Resident Evil: Infinite Darkness (Note: Known in Japan as Biohazard: Infinite Darkness (Japanese: バイオハザード: インフィニット ダークネス, Hepburn: Baiohazādo: Infinitto Dākunesu)) (stylized as RESIDENT EVIL: Infinite Darkness) is a Japanese horror-action biopunk CGI original net animation miniseries set in the same universe as the Resident Evil video game series by Capcom. The series stars Resident Evil 2 protagonists Leon S. Kennedy and Claire Redfield, following the events of the 2008 film Resident Evil: Degeneration.

Produced by TMS Entertainment and animated by Quebico, Infinite Darkness was released on July 8, 2021, on Netflix.

== Premise ==
Set between the events of Resident Evil 4 and Resident Evil 5, the series takes place in 2006 after a hacking incident is uncovered at the White House. Leon S. Kennedy is ordered to investigate the incident, but he encounters zombies when the White House is targeted in a mysterious attack. He later meets Claire Redfield again, who has been investigating a strange drawing made by a child refugee while working on a TerraSave-led mission to oversee construction of a welfare facility in a fictional South Asian republic of Penamstan.

== Voice cast ==
Character	Japanese voice actor	English voice actor
Leon S. Kennedy	Toshiyuki Morikawa	Nick Apostolides
Claire Redfield	Yūko Kaida	Stephanie Panisello
Jason	Fumihiko Tachiki	Ray Chase
Shen May	Megumi Han	Jona Xiao
Patrick	Kenji Nojima	Billy Kametz
Wilson	Aruno Tahara	Doug Stone
Graham	Kazuhiko Inoue	Joe J. Thomas
Ryan	Mitsuru Ogata	Brad Venable

== Episodes ==
No.	Title	Directed by	Written by	Original release date
1	"Episode 1"	Eiichirō Hasumi	Shogo Muto and Eiichirō Hasumi	July 8, 2021
In 2000, a U.S. helicopter is shot down in the country of Penamstan; its crew is attacked by the local people. Despite their contrary orders, the Mad Dogs unit lands and tries to save the crew. Six years later, Claire works as an aid worker in Penamstan, where she discovers hints that the survivors of the ongoing conflict were exposed to bio-organic weapons (B.O.W.s). Afterwards, the White House is attacked by a hacking incident, followed by several employees being infected. With hints pointing towards China, Leon, Shen May, and Jason, the hero of Penamstan, are dispatched with a submarine for a covert mission. Before leaving, Leon encounters Claire at the White House, who informs him of her discovery.
2	"Episode 2"	Eiichirō Hasumi	Shogo Muto and Eiichirō Hasumi	July 8, 2021
Leon, Jason, and Shen May head in their submarine into Chinese waters while Claire researches into what happened to the Mad Dogs. Their mission is also shown during a flashback in which the Mad Dogs rescued a survivor, but could only bring back his infected body. While on the submarine, rat-like B.O.W.s attack and kill the crew. Leon, Jason and Shen May evacuate the submarine together in an escape pod before it self-destructs. The destruction is blamed on a nearby Chinese fleet by Defense Secretary Wilson. It is revealed in a Shanghai safe house that Shen May and Jason are working together to expose Wilson for his involvement in Penamstan, where the Mad Dogs were infected when they interfered with the testing of B.O.W. soldiers. Leon refuses to help Jason and Shen May. As he confronts them, he apparently shoots Jason to death while Shen May escapes.
3	"Episode 3"	Eiichirō Hasumi	Shogo Muto and Eiichirō Hasumi	July 8, 2021
Claire investigates the house of the last survivor of the Mad Dogs besides Jason, but he has already killed himself. It is revealed that the unit's soldiers were infected during their mission in Penamstan. Meanwhile, Leon follows Shen May to her grandfather's home. After he forces his way in, it is revealed that Shen May's brother was the soldier that was saved by the Mad Dogs, but he was already infected with the virus and turned when the Mad Dogs brought him back to base. Shen May's grandfather later brought him to China and the Mad Dogs worked as Wilson's private military force to keep being supplied with medication to stop their own infection from breaking out. Shen May worked together with Jason to expose Wilson. As Shen May offers Leon the information to expose Wilson, the house is destroyed and Shen May's grandfather and brother are killed. Leon and Shen May escape with the evidence and prepare to expose Wilson, while Claire is captured by Wilson's men after she tries to confront him about his actions.
4	"Episode 4"	Eiichirō Hasumi	Shogo Muto and Eiichirō Hasumi	July 8, 2021
Claire awakes in a laboratory after being captured by Wilson's men, while President Graham prepares a peace accord with the government of Penamstan. Wilson reveals that he is breeding supersoldiers to use them against the enemies of the United States. Wilson then tries to convince Claire to cooperate with him, but she refuses. Jason reappears and turns into a B.O.W. as Leon and Shen May arrive. Jason infects Wilson and fights with Leon and Shen May, as he tries to reveal himself to the world. Leon rescues Claire after Jason kills Shen May. Both of them work together to stop Jason from revealing himself while the laboratory is destroyed by acid. Leon and Claire escape while Graham makes the peace agreement with Penamstan. Wilson remains in hiding, while having to use inhibitors provided by Tricell. After recovering, Leon and Claire part ways as Leon refuses to publish the information regarding Wilson's plot, vowing to use it to stop further usage of B.O.W.s..

== Production ==
Prior to its proper unveiling, Netflix Portugal tweeted out a teaser trailer on Twitter alongside the claim that it would be a "CGI movie", but shortly deleted the tweet afterward. Infinite Darkness was officially announced at the virtual 2020 Tokyo Game Show as a CGI series by the show's executive producer, Hiroyuki Kobayashi. At the virtual Biohazard Showcase event in April 2021, it was revealed that Eiichirō Hasumi will serve as the series' director and Yugo Kanno as composer.

Series' production is to be handled by TMS Entertainment, with animation services by Quebico.

Director Eiichirō Hasumi set the mini-series before the events of Resident Evil 6, in order to have more freedom with the younger incarnations of Leon and Claire, as he noted they were too popular and thus he wanted to be careful with their characterizations. The new character named Jason is meant to mirror Leon's sense of justice because of their similar backgrounds and ideas on how to deal with partners. The director was warned to remember the mini-series "was animation" during the interactions between Leon and Jason, and to maintain tension.

== Home media ==
Resident Evil: Infinite Darkness was released on DVD and Blu-ray on December 21, 2021.

== Reception ==
On Rotten Tomatoes, the show has an approval rating of 50% with an average rating of 5.5/10, based on 22 critic reviews. The website's critics consensus reads, "Resident Evil: Infinite Darkness's superb animation captures the visceral thrills of its terrifying source material–if only the story were as gripping as the moments of terror.

Austin Jones of Paste Magazine gave the show 5 out of 10 stars, writing that "Infinite Darkness has a barrier to entry due to its heavy reliance on a preexisting investment in the greater Resident Evil series."

Sam Barsanti of The A.V. Club gave the show C+: "Nobody is going to confuse it for high art, certainly, but what didn't really work in video games and what didn't make sense in the Milla Jovovich-led movies surprisingly does work as a CG four-episode TV show." Andrew Webster of The Verge stated that "some tie-ins are meant to lure in new fans, while others are designed to appease existing ones; Infinite Darkness is most definitely the latter". Sam Stone of CBR in his review wrote: "Overall, the anime is a fun side story that offers a chance for Leon to jump back into the spotlight while evoking a past era for the franchise, deviating from horror to deliver global action." Kate Sánchez of But Why Tho? A Geek Community gave the show 7.5 out of 10 stars: "Resident Evil: Infinite Darkness is far more about geopolitical intrigue, corporate espionage, and surviving war than it is about killing zombies." Taylor Lyles of IGN gave the show 7 out of 10: "Despite predictability on who would serve as an antagonist, the bad performance and animation by certain minor characters, and the imbalance of importance and screen time for our two protagonists, Infinite Darkness is a step in the right direction." Tessa Smith of Mama's Geeky gave the show 3 out of 5: "While there are some animation and pacing issues, overall this show is not only action packed, it gives the audience a peek at what Leon & Claire were up to in between games."

== Media ==
=== Comic miniseries ===
In October 2020, American distributor company Tokyopop announced a "manga-style" graphic novel based on the series and that it will be released alongside the anime. The eventual 5 part miniseries titled Resident Evil: Infinite Darkness - The Beginning was pushed back to 8 March 2022, and then to September 2022 but was delayed again with its final release date being December 21, 2022. A graphic novel collection of all issues was released on March 12, 2024.
