= Big Joys, Small Sorrows =

1986 Japanese film by Keisuke Kinoshita

- Japanese poster for Big Joys, Small Sorrows
- Kanji: 新・喜びも悲しみも幾歳月
- Directed by: Keisuke Kinoshita
- Written by: Keisuke Kinoshita
- Starring: Go Kato; Reiko Ohara
- Cinematography: Kozo Okazaki
- Music by: Chuji Kinoshita
- Distributed by: Shochiku
- Release date: June 28, 1986 (Japan)
- Running time: 130 minutes
- Country: Japan
- Language: Japanese
- Box office: ¥395 million

Big Joys, Small Sorrows (Japanese: 新・喜びも悲しみも幾歳月, Hepburn: Shin Yorokobi mo Kanashimi mo Ikutoshitsuki) is a 1986 Japanese film directed by Keisuke Kinoshita, revisiting his melancholic earlier work, Times of Joy and Sorrow (1957), of a lighthouse keeper and the transient lifestyle he and his family endure. Shot at 10 different lighthouses, four temples, and various scenic locations (including two of the famous Three Views of Japan (日本三景)), spanning the length of Japan from Kyushu to Hokkaido, the film serves a secondary purpose as an insightful time capsule travelogue of early 1980s Japan. It is Kinoshita's 48th and last film.

== Plot ==
Fujita, a lighthouse keeper of the Maritime Safety Agency, prepares to transfer to another lighthouse as his father and a young protege drop in to see him off, identifying what will be a story told over the course of a decade from the perspectives of 3 generations of a family, and their evolving relationships with each other. The film follows the family through their trials and tribulations as Fujita transfers to different lighthouses during the course of his career, the children grow up and leave the family to go to school and start their own families, the father rejoins the family as his health fails and is unable to care for himself, and they learn the value of family and each day spent together.

== Cast ==
- Gō Katō as Yoshiaki Fujita (Sugimoto)
- Reiko Ohara as Asako Fujita (Sugimoto)
- Hitoshi Ueki as Kunio Sugimoto
- Kiichi Nakai as Keijiro Daimon
- Misako Konno as Yukiko Nagao
- Ken Tanaka as Takeshi Nagao
- Yoko Shinoyama as Masako Fujita (Daimon)
- Hayao Okamoto as Eisuke Fujita (Sugimoto)

== Production ==
Kinoshita based the script to his earlier film, Times of Joy and Sorrow, on an article written by Tanaka Kiyo, the wife of a lighthouse keeper at the Shioyazaki lighthouse in Fukushima. The plot of Times of Joy and Sorrow encompasses the militarization of Japan during World War 2, and involves a sense of futility as the lighthouse is darkened during the war and bombs explode outside the family home. These themes are absent in Big Joys, Small Sorrow, which speaks to the increased optimism and prosperity of Japan in the 1980s, as well as the frustration felt by Fujita's wife Asako, who is more able to express her thoughts regarding her life as the wife of a lighthouse keeper rather than dutifully accepting her fate in Times of Joy and Sorrow.

The film received support from the then Maritime Safety Agency, since renamed the Japan Coast Guard, and serves as a tribute to the agency with unprecedented access not only to the lighthouses, but a Bell 212 helicopter, the Kure Maritime Safety University, aboard ships such as the Zao (PLH-05) and Teshio (PM-03 & PM-09) class patrol vessels, the Kojima (PL-21) training vessel during a fleet review, as well as a generous plug for All Nippon Airways, creating a "gorgeous travelogue," said Los Angeles Times film critic Kevin Thomas, of the "unspoiled beauty spots on Japan’s coastlines".

=== Featured locations ===
The wide range of filming locations

==== Lighthouses ====
- Kyogamisaki Lighthouse, Tango, Kyoto Prefecture
- Irōzaki Lighthouse, Izu, Shizuoka Prefecture
- Hesaki Lighthouse, Kitakyushu, Fukuoka Prefecture
- Himeshima Lighthouse(ja), Himeshima, Ōita Prefecture
- Mizunokojima Lighthouse, Bungo Channel
- Hachijojima Lighthouse(ja), Hachijō-jima Island, Izu Islands
- Shiriyazaki Lighthouse, Shimokita, Aomori Prefecture
- Port of Hakodate(ja), Hakodate, Hokkaido
- Esan Misaki Lighthouse(ja), Hakodate, Hokkaido
- Yagoshima Misaki Lighthouse(ja), Shiriuchi, Hokkaido

==== Other points of interest ====
- Nishi-Maizuru Station, Maizuru, Kyoto Prefecture
- Nariai-ji Buddhist Temple (ja), Miyazu, Kyoto Prefecture
- Amanohashidate, Tango-Amanohashidate-Ōeyama Quasi-National Park, Kyoto Prefecture - one of the Three Views of Japan
- Matsuno-dera Buddhist Temple (ja), Maizuru, Kyoto Prefecture
- Myōtsū-ji Buddhist Temple, Obama, Fukui Prefecture
- St John's Anglican Church (ja), Hakodate, Hokkaido
- Hiroshima Peace Memorial, Hiroshima
- Kure Maritime Safety University, Kure, Hiroshima Prefecture
- Itsukushima Shinto Shrine, Miyajima, Hiroshima Prefecture - one of the Three Views of Japan
- Fukue-jima Island, Gotō Islands, Nagasaki Prefecture

== Release ==
Screened in competition at the Locarno Film Festival, Big Joys, Small Sorrows was theatrically released internationally in 1986 by Shochiku, earning a modest ¥395 million. VHS and Laserdisc editions are now scarce, however region 2 DVDs are still available in Japan from Shochiku Home Entertainment.

The Criterion Channel included Big Joys, Small Sorrows among the inaugural films available for streaming upon its launch in Spring 2019.

== Reception ==
Kevin Thomas, in his review for the Los Angeles Times found the film was "a charmingly apt title for an unabashedly sentimental and old-fashioned paean to the enduring virtues of family life" but that it could not be deemed "more than a minor work of a major director, considered as one of his country’s greatest film makers."

== Awards ==
List of awards and nominations
Award/Film festival	Ceremony	Category	Recipient	Result
Japan Academy Film Prize	10th Japan Academy Awards	Best Picture	Big Joys, Small Sorrows	Nominated
Japan Academy Film Prize	10th Japan Academy Awards	Screenplay of the Year	Keisuke Kinoshita	Nominated
Japan Academy Film Prize	10th Japan Academy Awards	Best Supporting Actor	Hitoshi Ueki	Won
Japan Academy Film Prize	10th Japan Academy Awards	Best Supporting Actress	Misako Konno	Nominated
Kinema Junpo Film Awards	60th Kinema Junpo Film Awards	Best Supporting Actor	Hitoshi Ueki	Won
Fumiko Yamaji Film Award	11th Fumiko Yamaji Film Awards	1st Actress Award	Reiko Ohara	Won
Mainichi Film Awards	41st Mainichi Film Awards	Best Supporting Actor	Hitoshi Ueki	Won
