= Hitoshi Ueki =

Japanese actor and musician (1927–2007)

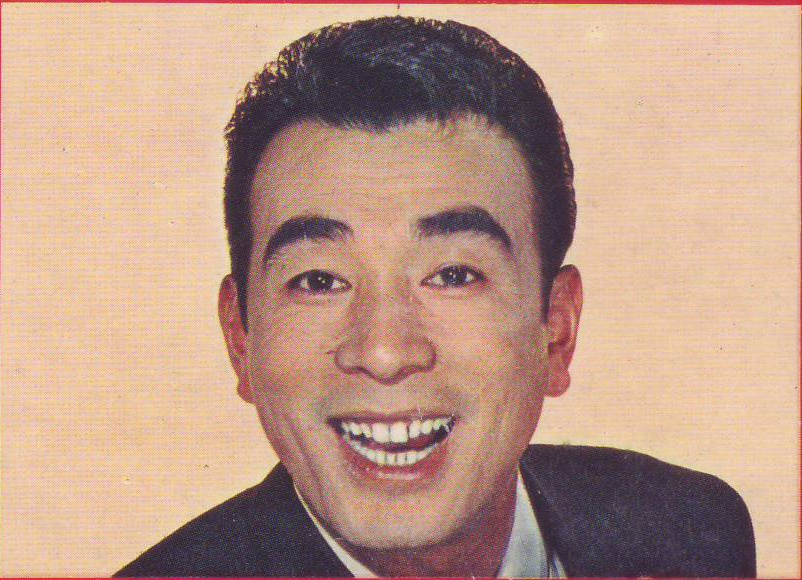
- Ueki in 1963
- Born: February 25, 1927; Aichi Prefecture, Japan
- Died: March 27, 2007 (aged 80)
- Occupations: Actor, comedian, singer, guitarist
- Years active: 1960–2007

Hitoshi Ueki (植木 等, Ueki Hitoshi; February 25, 1927 – March 27, 2007) was a Japanese actor, comedian, singer, and guitarist. He won six awards for acting. His film credits stretch from 1960 to 1995.

Ueki came to fame through the comic jazz-band The Crazy Cats led by Hajime Hana. His major appearances were in the Musekinin Otoko film series, the comedy variety show Shabondama Holiday, the prime-time television series The Hangman, and the ten 2-hour television shows in the Nagoya Yomeiri Monogatari franchise.

He appeared in the Akira Kurosawa epic jidaigeki film Ran in 1985, receiving a nomination for the Japan Academy Prize for Outstanding Performance by an Actor in a Supporting Role, and earned the Japanese Academy, Kinema Junpo, and Mainichi film awards for best supporting actor for his role as the eccentric grandfather in Big Joys, Small Sorrows in 1987.

On stage, he portrayed Billy Flynn in the musical Chicago, voiced the Roddy McDowall role in the Japanese market release of Planet of the Apes, and served as the narrator in the Japanese version of Tom and Jerry.

His hit song with Hana Hajime and the Crazy Cats, Sūdara-bushi, placed in the Oricon top ten, and landed him an appearance on the NHK annual music spectacular Kōhaku Uta Gassen.

Ueki received the Purple Ribbon Medal of Honour in 1993 and the 4th Class Order of the Rising Sun in 1999.

In 2011, new technology was used to create a Vocaloid voicebank using his voice.

== Discography ==
=== Albums ===
- "Hai, oyobi desu" (ハイ、およびです, Hi, I come here), 1966
- "Onna no sekai" (女の世界, The World of Women), 1971
- "Sūdara-Densetsu" (スーダラ伝説, The Legend of "Sūdara"), 1990
- "Ueki Hitoshi, The Concert" (植木等ザ・コンサート, Hitoshi Ueki, The Concert), 1991
- "Sūdara-Gaiden" (スーダラ外伝, The Legend of "Sūdara" part2), 1992
- "Ueki Hitoshi teki ongaku" (植木等的音楽, Music of Hitoshi Ueki), 1995

== Partial filmography ==
=== Films ===
- Tattoo Ari (1982)
- The Crazy Family (1984)
- Ran (1985) as Nobuhiro Fujimaki
- Ora Tōkyō sa Iguda (1985)
- Big Joys, Small Sorrows (1986) as Kunio Sugimoto
- Aitsu ni Koishite (1987)
- Maiko Haaaan!!! (2007)

=== Television ===
- Momotarō-zamurai (1976–77) as Saruno Inosuke
