= Japan Coast Guard =

Coast guard of Japan

Japan Coast Guard 海上保安庁 Kaijō Hoan-chō
- Logo

- S-Mark

- Japan Coast Guard ensign
- Abbreviation: JCG
- Motto: 正義仁愛; Righteous Benevolence

Agency overview
- Formed: 1948; 78 years ago (as the Maritime Safety Agency); April 2000; 26 years ago (as the Japan Coast Guard)
- Employees: 13,744
- Annual budget: ¥210.601 billion Japanese yen (2024)

Jurisdictional structure
- National agency (Operations jurisdiction): Japan
- Operations jurisdiction: Japan
- Legal jurisdiction: Maritime law enforcement within Japan's EEZ
- Governing body: Ministry of Land, Infrastructure, Transport and Tourism

Operational structure
- Headquarters: 2-1-3, Kasumigaseki, Chiyoda-ku, Tokyo 100-8976, Japan; 35°40′33″N 139°45′00″E
- Agency executives: Yoshio Seguchi, Commandant; Koichi Miyazawa, Vice commandant; Hiroaki Kanosue, Vice commandant for operations
- Child agency: Japan Coast Guard Academy

Facilities
- Numbered regions: 11
- Vessels and crafts: 476
- Fixed wings: 33
- Rotary wings: 60
- Remotely piloted aircraft systems: 3

Website
- Official website (in Japanese); Official website (in English)

The Japan Coast Guard (Japanese: 海上保安庁, Hepburn: Kaijō Hoan-chō) is the coast guard responsible for the protection of the coastline of Japan under the oversight of the Ministry of Land, Infrastructure, Transport and Tourism. It consists of about 13,700 personnel. The Japan Coast Guard was founded in 1948 as the Maritime Safety Agency and received its current English name in 2000.

The motto of the Japan Coast Guard is "Righteous Benevolence" (正義仁愛, Seigi Jin'ai).

== History ==
Coast guard operations were performed by the Imperial Japanese Navy during the Empire of Japan, but the ability of maintaining maritime security declined significantly following the surrender of Japan in August 1945 and the resulting dissolution of the Imperial Japanese Navy. Maritime trade and smuggling had increased dramatically, and even pirates had begun to appear. Consultations were undertaken between the Japanese government, which wanted to restore its public security capacity as soon as possible, and the Allied countries which wanted to maintain the disarmament of Japan. However, in 1946, an "Illegal Immigration Control Headquarters" was established in the Ministry of Transport after cholera was transmitted to Kyushu by smugglers from the Korean Peninsula. This resulted in an increase in severe infections.

Meanwhile, the GHQ/SCAP also recognized the deficiencies of the Japanese maritime security system and in March 1946 Captain Frank M. Meals of the United States Coast Guard (USCG) was tasked to consider the situation. Captain Meals suggested the establishment of a comprehensive coast guard organization based on the USCG. In response to this, the Maritime Safety Agency (MSA) was established as an external agency of the Ministry of Transportation in 1948. Its English name was changed to the Japan Coast Guard in April 2000. In 1952 the Coastal Safety Agency was created with ships supplied by the United States and spun off in 1954 as the Japan Maritime Self Defense Force.

=== Minesweeping operations ===
Immediately after the end of World War II, a large number of aerial mines laid by the US military were left in the waters around Japan, and clearing them became an important mission of the MSA. For this mission, minesweepers of the former Imperial Japanese Navy were incorporated into the MSA and later were transferred to the Safety Security Force, a predecessor of the Japan Maritime Self-Defense Force.

In addition to activities in Japan's waters, in 1950, two flotillas of minesweepers were sent to the Korean Peninsula under the United Nations flag during the Korean War.

=== Regional cooperation ===
In October 1999, Prime Minister Keizō Obuchi presented a series of major maritime anti-piracy cooperation proposals to ASEAN members. These proposals included having the Japan Coast Guard patrol regional waters alongside ASEAN maritime forces so as to establish a "regional coast guard body," strengthening state support for shipping companies, and improving coordination of regional responses to maritime attacks. Representatives of Indonesia, Malaysia, and Singapore expressed interest in the idea, although further discussions held by Obuchi's successor, Yoshirō Mori, did not yield warm responses, and Chinese representatives questioned the need for any regional anti-piracy cooperation. Nonetheless, these ideas finally materialized somewhat in 2001 when armed Japan Coast Guard ships ventured into foreign waters in order to provide Indian, Thai, and Filipino maritime forces with anti-piracy training. Nations which took part in these exercises for the first time included Brunei and Indonesia in 2002, as well as Singapore in 2003.

Nonetheless, successive efforts by Japanese authorities to further promote a multilateral and regional maritime defense system have stalled due to disagreements and lack of commitment by regional powers, and Japanese players have tended to favour bilateral discussions instead.

In October 2017, the JCG launched the Mobile Cooperation Team (MCT), which is tasked to conduct training with their foreign counterparts overseas.

=== Establishment of 118 emergency number ===
In May 2000, the Japan Coast Guard introduced a nationwide emergency number, 118, for reporting accidents at sea, oil spills, suspicious vessels, smuggling, and illegal immigration. It can be dialed from mobile phones, landline phones, public phones, and marine radiotelephones in Japan. In 2018, there were 5,028 calls to 118 regarding accidents or possible accidents at sea.

=== Battle of Amami-Ōshima ===
On December 22, 2001, Japan Coast Guard ships intercepted a Chinese-flagged vessel, believed to be North Korean in origin, in the Japanese Exclusive Economic Zone between Kyushu and China. When the vessel failed to respond, she was fired upon by the Japan Coast Guard ships and an exchange of gunfire resulted. The unidentified vessel sank in the Chinese Exclusive Economic Zone with all hands. The ship, later salvaged by the Japan Coast Guard, was found to be carrying weapons and spy equipment. The wreck and its contents were put on display at the Japan Coast Guard Museum at Yokohama.

=== Haneda Airport Collision ===
On January 2, 2024, a Japan Coast Guard DHC-8 'Mizunagi 1' providing relief support in response to the 2024 Noto earthquake collided with a Japan Airlines Flight 516, an Airbus A350-900, resulting in the deaths of five Coast Guard aircrew and the severe injury of a sixth. The crash occurred at Tokyo's Haneda Airport.

== Missions ==
The mission of the Japan Coast Guard is to ensure security and safety at sea. It is responsible for performing the following tasks:

- Maritime law enforcement and national security
- Search and rescue and disaster response
- Hydrographic and oceanographic surveying
- Maritime traffic management

Although the Japan Coast Guard is legally a civilian organization as stipulated in Article 25 of the Coast Guard Law, it has seen increased quasi-military responsibilities and has wide latitude in its domestic and border security missions. In emergency situations, the Japan Maritime Self-Defense Force (JMSDF) can assist the Japan Coast Guard in conducting law enforcement activities as stipulated in Article 82 of the Self-Defense Forces Law (SDFL), and the Japan Coast Guard may be placed under the direction of the Minister of Defense as stipulated in Article 80 of the SDFL. In such case, the Minister of Defense is able to give orders to the commandant of the Japan Coast Guard. However, the Japan Coast Guard is not allowed to use force against foreign governments or naval vessels and the JMSDF is likewise constrained in its operations in support of the Japan Coast Guard. In contrast, the China Coast Guard is allowed to use force against foreign governments or naval vessels, which are supposed to be protected by international law.

With China stepping up its grey-zone activities to challenge Japan, taking advantage of the gap between the Japan Coast Guard and the JMSDF in particular, some members of the Japanese Liberal Democratic Party have argued that the Japan Coast Guard should be more forceful in its opposition to China.

== Organization ==
=== National Headquarters ===
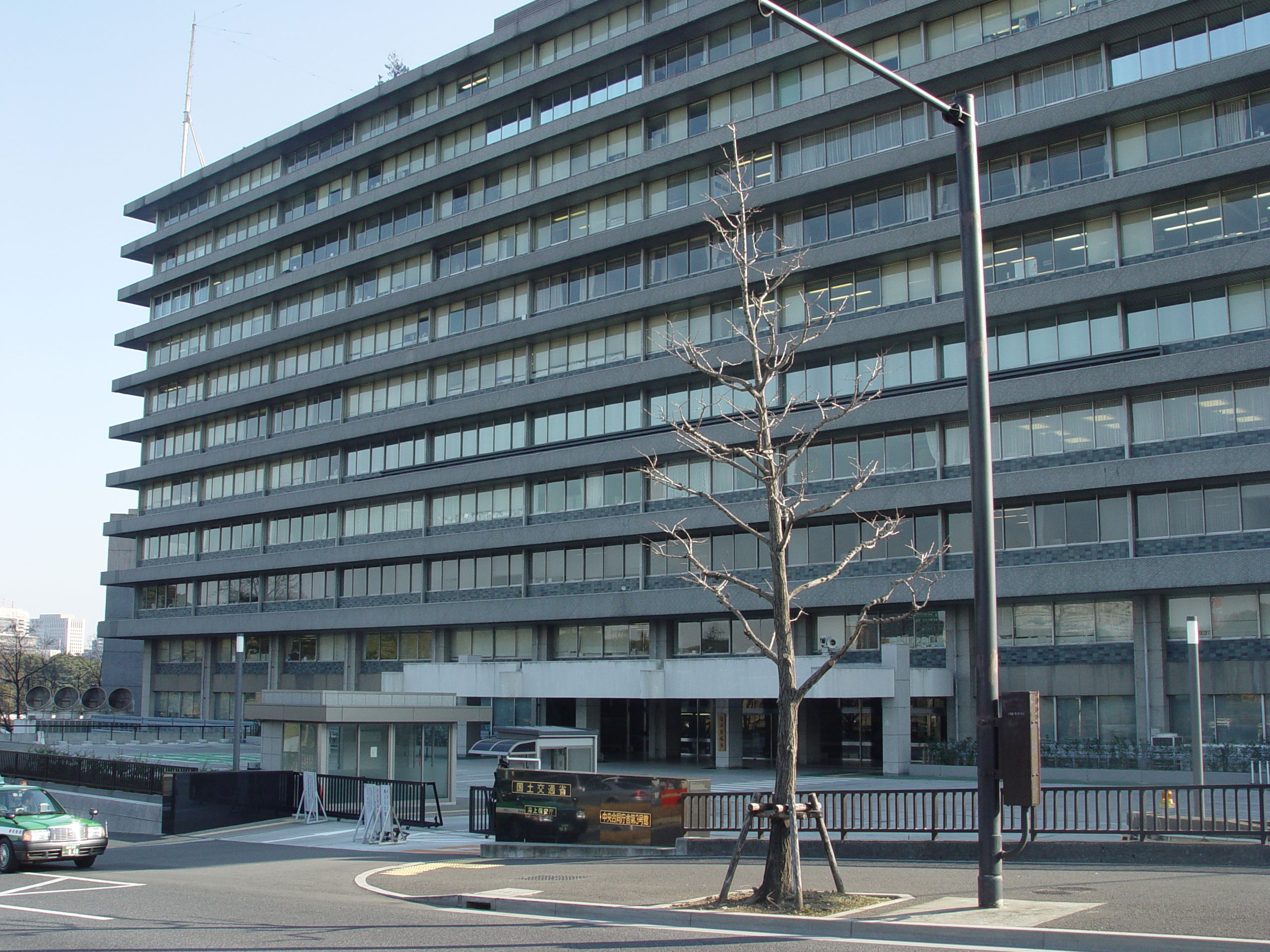
Main building of the Ministry of Land, Infrastructure, Transport and Tourism in Kasumigaseki, under which the Japan Coast Guard operates, and where it is headquartered

The Japan Coast Guard is led by a Commandant and two Vice Commandants. Lower ranking officers include the director general, directors and inspectors general.

Organization:

- Commandant
  - Vice Commandant
  - Vice Commandant for Operations
- Administrative Inspector General
- Administration Department
- Coast Guard Research Center
- Equipment and Technology Department
- Guard and Rescue Department
- Hydrographic and Oceanographic Department
- Maritime Traffic Department
- Coast Guard Academy (Kure)
- Coast Guard School (Maizuru)
  - Moji Branch (Kitakyushu)
  - Miyagi Branch (Iwanuma)
    - Kitakyushu Aviation Training Center (Kitakyushu)

The Japan Coast Guard Academy is a training institution, located in Kure, Hiroshima prefecture, established within the Coast Guard for the purpose of training cadets and officer candidates to become officers. Cadets of Regular Course are given a bachelor's degree upon graduation after four years of duration. About 60 cadets and 100 officer candidates graduate from the academy each year.

The Japan Coast Guard School is a training institution, located in Maizuru, Kyoto prefecture, where students to become enlisted personnel or receive further education and training. Moji Branch is for training the qualified personnel until the age of 61 for vessels, aircraft, and radio communications, also providing specialized training (e.g. vessel traffic controlling). Miyagi Branch has flight programs for helicopter aviators, maintenance technicians and radio operators, meanwhile subordinating Kitakyushu Aviation Training Center has flight programs for airplane aviators.

=== Operational units ===
==== Regional organization ====
A map of the division of jurisdiction between the 11 JCG regions

The JCG has divided the nation into eleven regions to facilitate its coast guard operations. Each region maintains a Regional Coast Guard Headquarters, under which there are various Coast Guard Offices, Coast Guard Stations, Air Stations, Hydrographic Observatory, and Traffic Advisory Service Centers.

Local Bureaus	Headquarters Location	Region of Responsibility
1st Regional Coast Guard Headquarters	Otaru, Hokkaido	Hokkaido, Northern Territories
2nd Regional Coast Guard Headquarters	Shiogama, Miyagi	Aomori, Iwate, Miyagi, Akita, Yamagata, Fukushima
3rd Regional Coast Guard Headquarters	Yokohama, Kanagawa	Ibaraki, Tochigi, Gunma, Saitama, Chiba, Tokyo, Kanagawa, Yamanashi, Shizuoka
4th Regional Coast Guard Headquarters	Nagoya, Aichi	Gifu, Aichi, Mie
5th Regional Coast Guard Headquarters	Kobe, Hyogo	Shiga, Kyoto (south of Nantan City), Osaka, Hyogo (Seto Inland Sea side), Nara, Wakayama, Tokushima, Kochi
6th Regional Coast Guard Headquarters	Hiroshima, Hiroshima	Okayama, Hiroshima, Yamaguchi (Seto Inland Sea side east of Yamaguchi City), Kagawa, Ehime
7th Regional Coast Guard Headquarters	Kitakyushu, Fukuoka	Yamaguchi (Seto Inland Sea side and Sea of Japan side west of Ube City), Fukuoka, Saga, Nagasaki, Oita (also in charge of the Ariake Sea in Kumamoto Prefecture)
8th Regional Coast Guard Headquarters	Maizuru, Kyoto	Kyoto (north of Kyōtamba), Fukui, Hyogo (Sea of Japan side), Tottori, Shimane (including Takeshima)
9th Regional Coast Guard Headquarters	Niigata, Niigata	Niigata, Toyama, Ishikawa, Nagano (also in charge of Sea of Japan side of the Tohoku region)
10th Regional Coast Guard Headquarters	Kagoshima, Kagoshima	Kumamoto (not including the Ariake Sea), Miyazaki, Kagoshima
11th Regional Coast Guard Headquarters	Naha, Okinawa	Okinawa (including the Senkaku Islands)

==== Special units ====
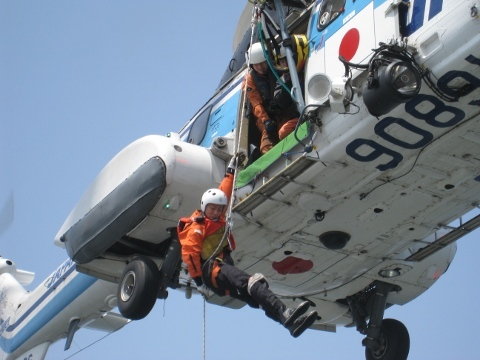
A SRT officer abseiling from an AS332L1 helicopter.

The JCG maintains three national-level elite units for each specialized fields:

Special Rescue Team (SRT) (特殊救難隊, Tokushu-kyūnan-tai).
Rescue swimmers and public safety diving team. Regional counterparts are Mobile Rescue Technician (機動救難士, Kidō-kyūnan-shi).
National Strike Team (NST) (機動防除隊, Kidō-bōjo-tai)
Offshore oil spill and chemical hazard response team. The Japanese counterpart of the National Strike Force (NSF) of the USCG.
Special Security Team (SST) (特殊警備隊, Tokushu-keibi-tai)
Counter-terrorism tactical team. Regional counterparts are Special Riot Squads (特別警備隊, Tokubetsu-keibi-tai).

== Ranks ==
=== Commissioned officers ===
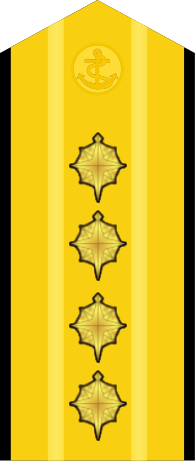
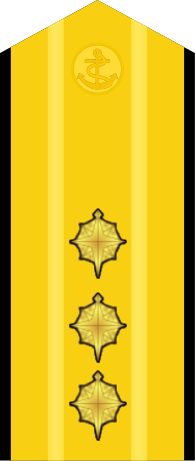
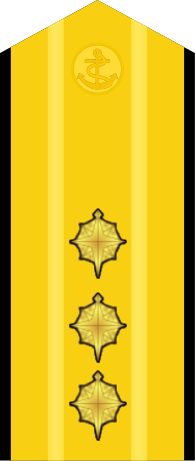
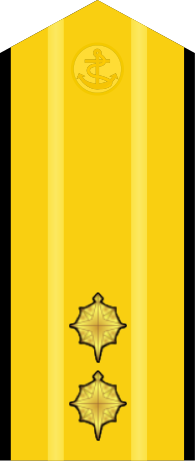
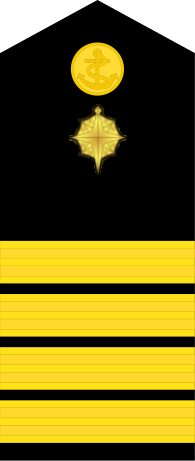
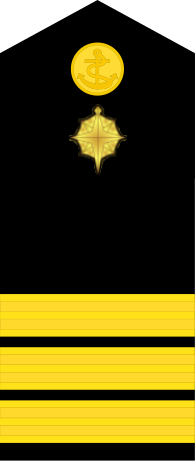
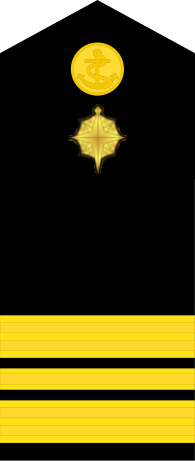
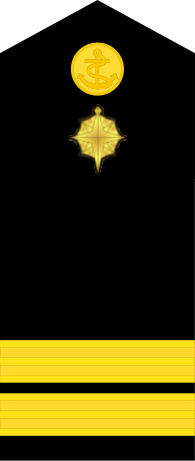
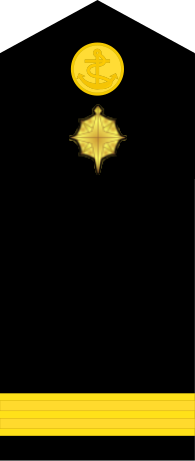
Rank group	General / flag officers				Senior officers			Junior officers
Japan Coast Guard
Japan Coast Guard	長官; Chōkan	次長 & 海上保安監; Jichō & Kaijō hoankan	一等海上保安監 (甲); Ittō kaijō hoan kan (Kō)	一等海上保安監 (乙); Ittō kaijō hoan kan (Otsu)	二等海上保安監; Ni-tō kaijō hoan kan	三等海上保安監; San-tō kaijō hoan kan	一等海上保安正; Ittō kaijō hoan sei	二等海上保安正; Ni-tō kaijō hoan sei	三等海上保安正; San-tō kaijō hoan sei

=== Enlisted personnel ===
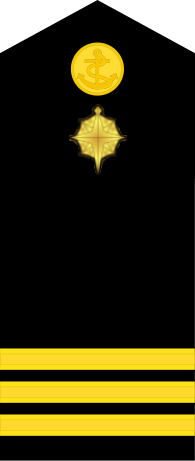
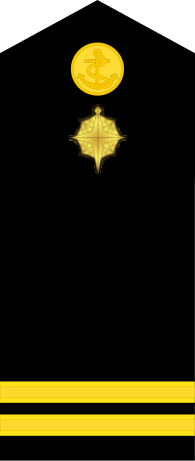
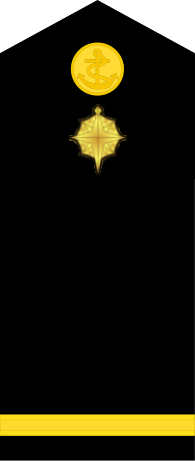
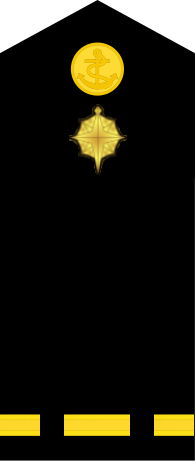
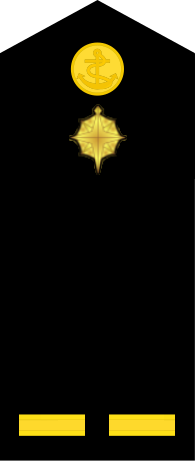
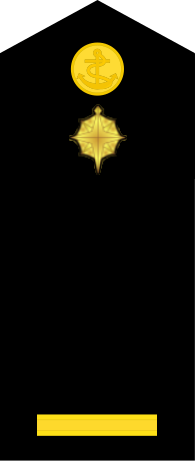
Rank group	Senior NCOs			Junior NCOs		Enlisted
Japan Coast Guard
Japan Coast Guard	一等海上保安士; Ittō kaijō hoan shi	二等海上保安士; Ni-tō kaijō hoan shi	三等海上保安士; San-tō kaijō hoan shi	一等海上保安士補; Ittō kaijō hoan shiho (Note: Not currently used since 1992, but the ranks still remain on Japan Coast Guard Act.)	二等海上保安士補; Ni-tō kaijō hoan shiho	三等海上保安士補; San-tō kaijō hoan shiho

== Equipment ==
=== Vessels ===
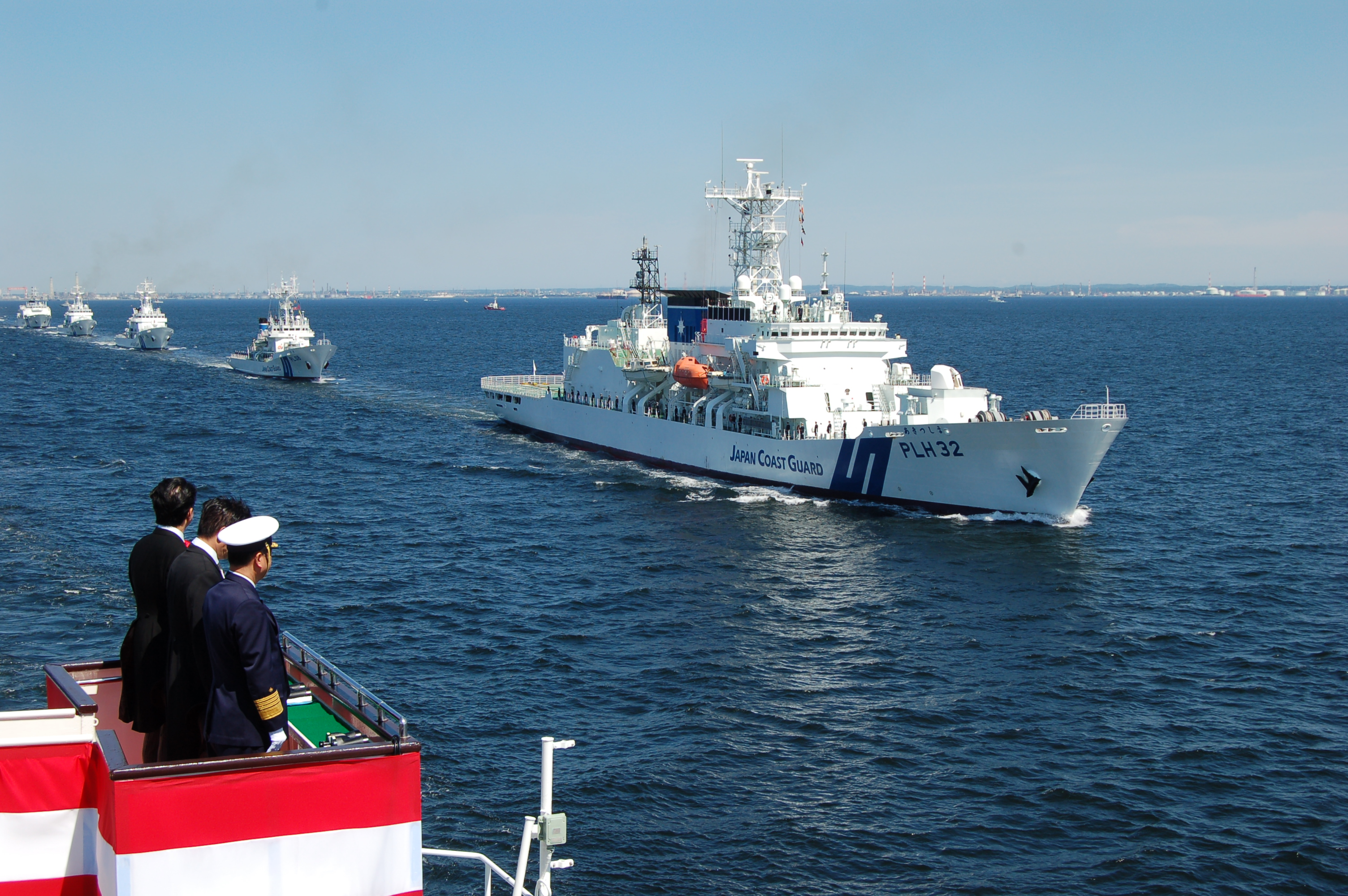
PM Abe and Adm Sato review the JCG fleet in honor of their 70th anniversary in 2018

Immediately after its creation, the MSA operated the second-hand ships of the former Japanese Navy, but it was only allowed to use smaller and slower vessels. The designations of PL, PM, PS and PC were used to classify ships as being: Patrol Ship – Large, Medium, Small and "Craft" = very small. From FY1949 the construction of new ships began. Because GHQ instructed the service to model its ships after those of the USCG, the 700-ton PL Daiou-class was based on Cactus-class buoy tenders, the 450-ton PM Awaji-class patrol vessel was based on Thetis-class patrol boats, the 270-ton PS Kuma-class patrol vessel was based on Active-class patrol boats, and the 23-meter PC Hatsunami-class patrol craft used a USCG 75-foot patrol boat as a model. However, these copies of American ship types were found wanting as they neither suited the actual operational work of the MSA nor the sea conditions around Japan.

As a result, when the Treaty of San Francisco came into force, MSA's own patrol ship's design work began. The PL type patrol vessels increased in size to the 900-ton Nojima-class patrol vessel, PS type patrol vessels differentiated into the 350-ton PS Tokachi-class patrol vessel and the 130-ton PS Hidaka-class patrol vessel. Later, the 350-ton class PS's were reclassified as PM type.

In the late 1970s, it was clear that the new international rules on national exclusive economic zones would demand a considerable increase in the size of the Maritime Safety Agency fleets. To cope with this dramatic increase in workload, the 1,000-ton PL Shiretoko-class patrol vessels, 500-ton PM Teshio-class patrol vessels and 30-meter PC Murakumo-class patrol craft were built in large quantities. In addition, the Japan MSA also began protecting shipping operations by deploying air-sea rescue helicopters on-board PLHs.

Since the 1980s, criminal ships had advanced into Japan's ocean spaces and were showing high speeds, also North Korean armed trawlers (fushin-sen) began to appear. For this reason, the MSA designed and built the 180-ton PS Mihashi-class patrol vessels that combined both ocean-going capability and high-speed performance. In addition, upping the speed of PL and PM type patrol vessels became important and this has also been achieved. As a final measure, by equipping JCG ships with remote control turrets incorporating automatic tracking functions applied to the ship's machine cannon, precise shooting became possible.

Due to Japan's increased focus on grey-zone challenges around the Senkaku Islands, JCG's facilities on Ishigaki Island have been expanded so that 12 large patrol vessels can be stationed there. Ten Kunigami-class and two Hateruma-class patrol vessels have been homeported at Ishigaki, along with housing for up to 600 crew, making Ishigaki JCG's largest base, surpassing JCG's facilities at Yokohama. Another half dozen ships including three Tsugaru-class are stationed 412 km (256 mi) north of Ishigaki at JCG's 11th Regional Coast Guard Headquarters at Naha.

==== Statistics ====
The JCG operates 476 watercraft, these include the following:

- Patrol vessels: 147
- Patrol craft: 239
- Special guard and rescue craft: 67
- Hydrographic survey vessels: 15
- Aids to navigation evaluation vessels: 1
- Buoy tenders: 5
- Aids to navigation tenders: 18
- Training vessels: 3
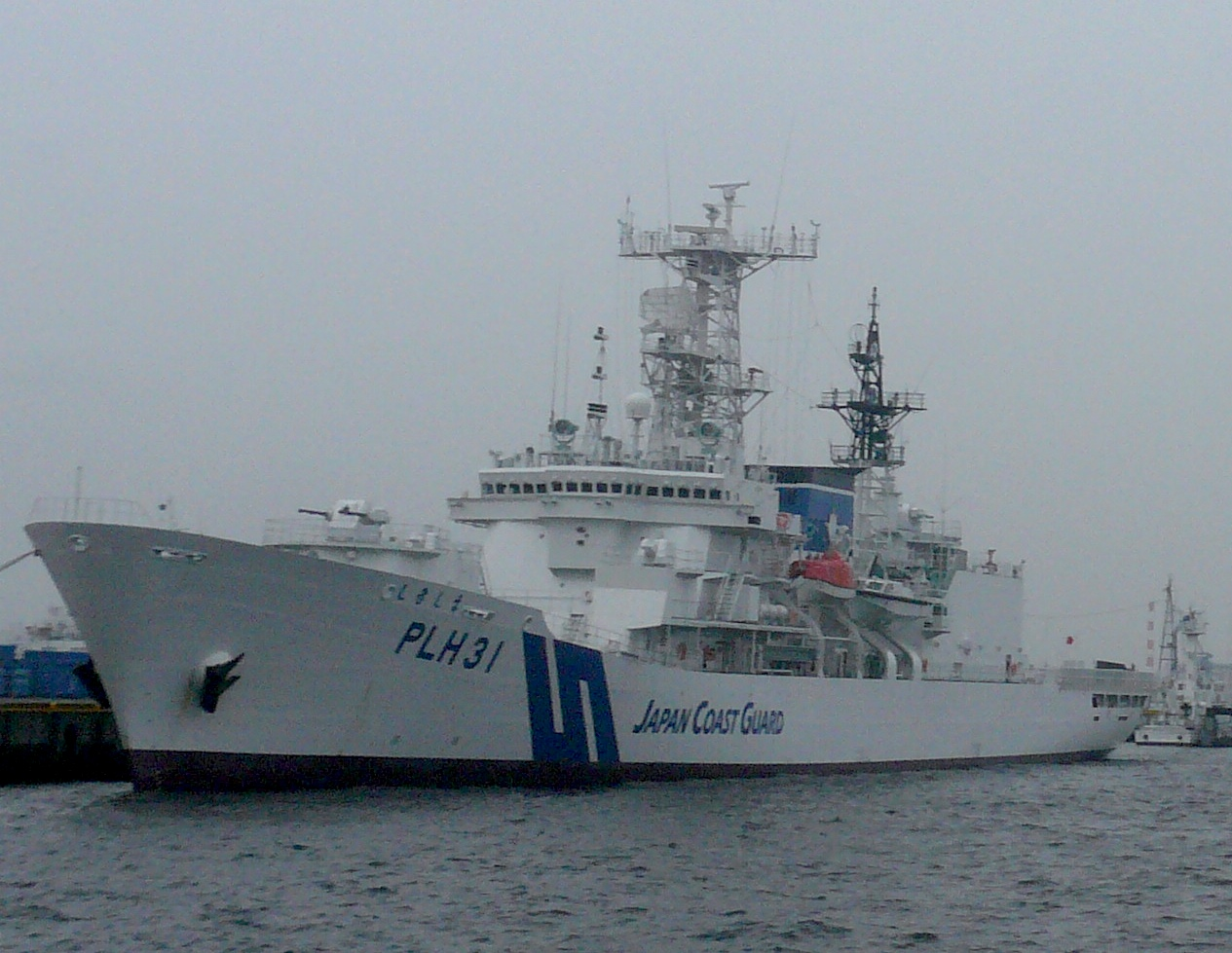
Shikishima (PLH-31)

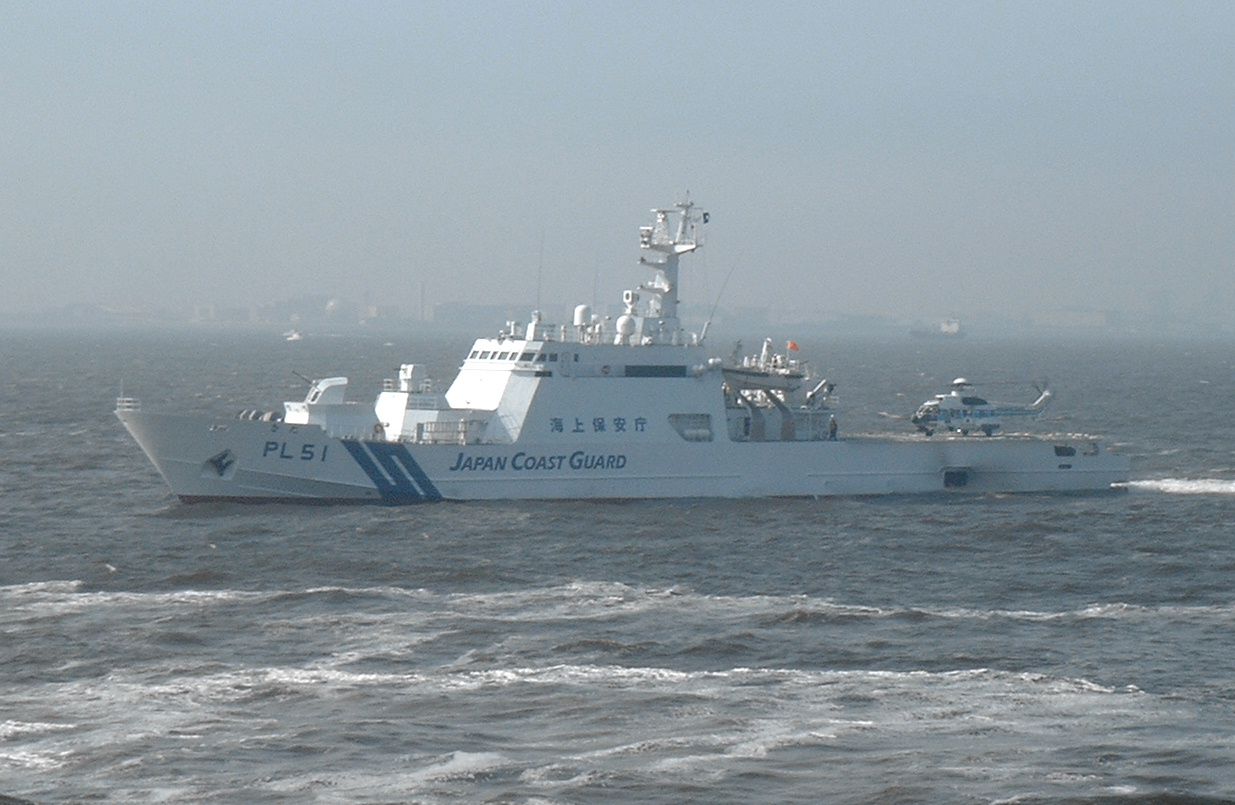
Hida (PL-51)

=== Aircraft ===
The JCG operates 98 aircraft, these include:

- Fixed wing: 35
- Rotary wing: 60
- Remotely piloted aircraft system: 3
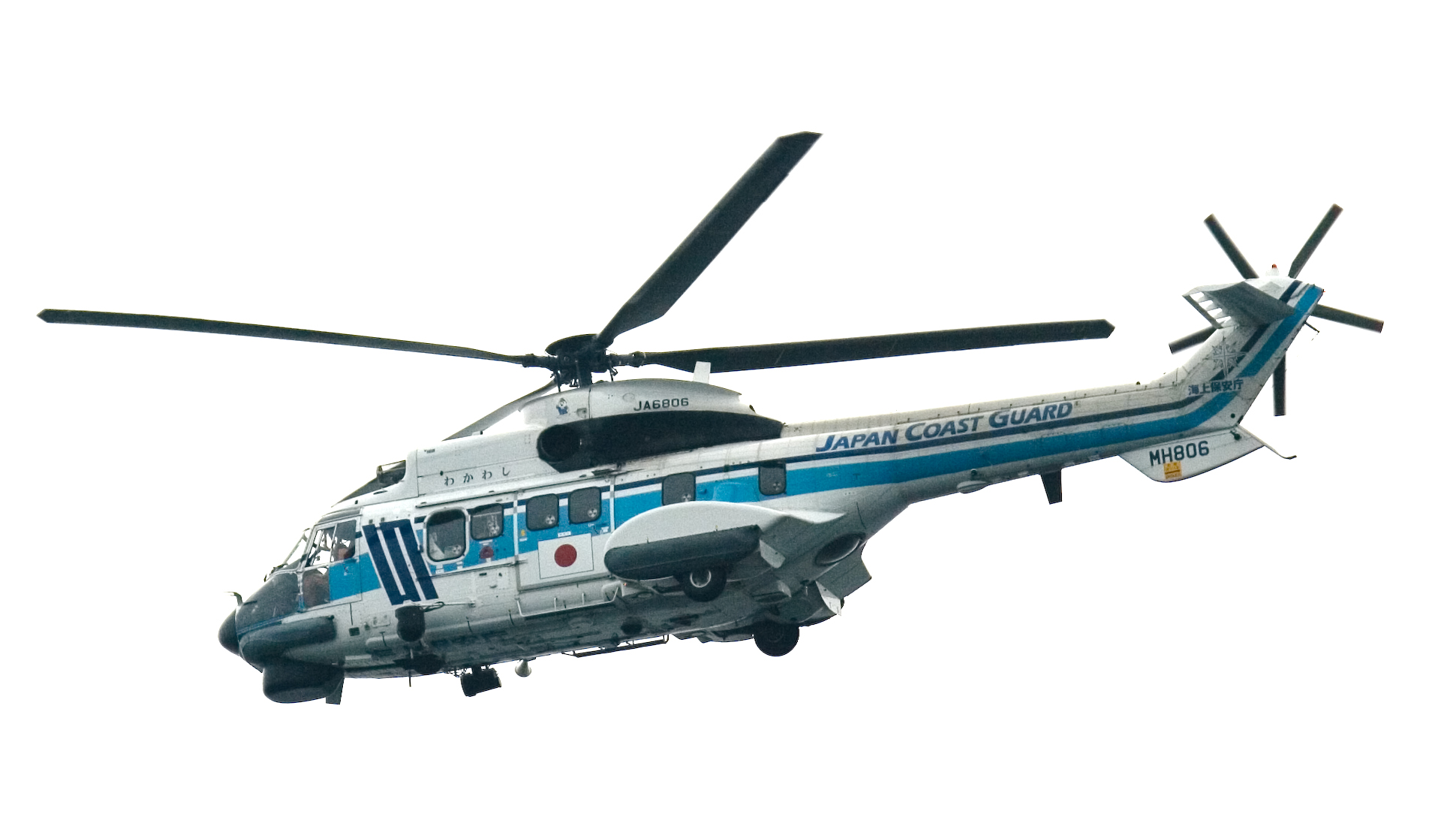
Eurocopter AS332 Super Puma of the JCG

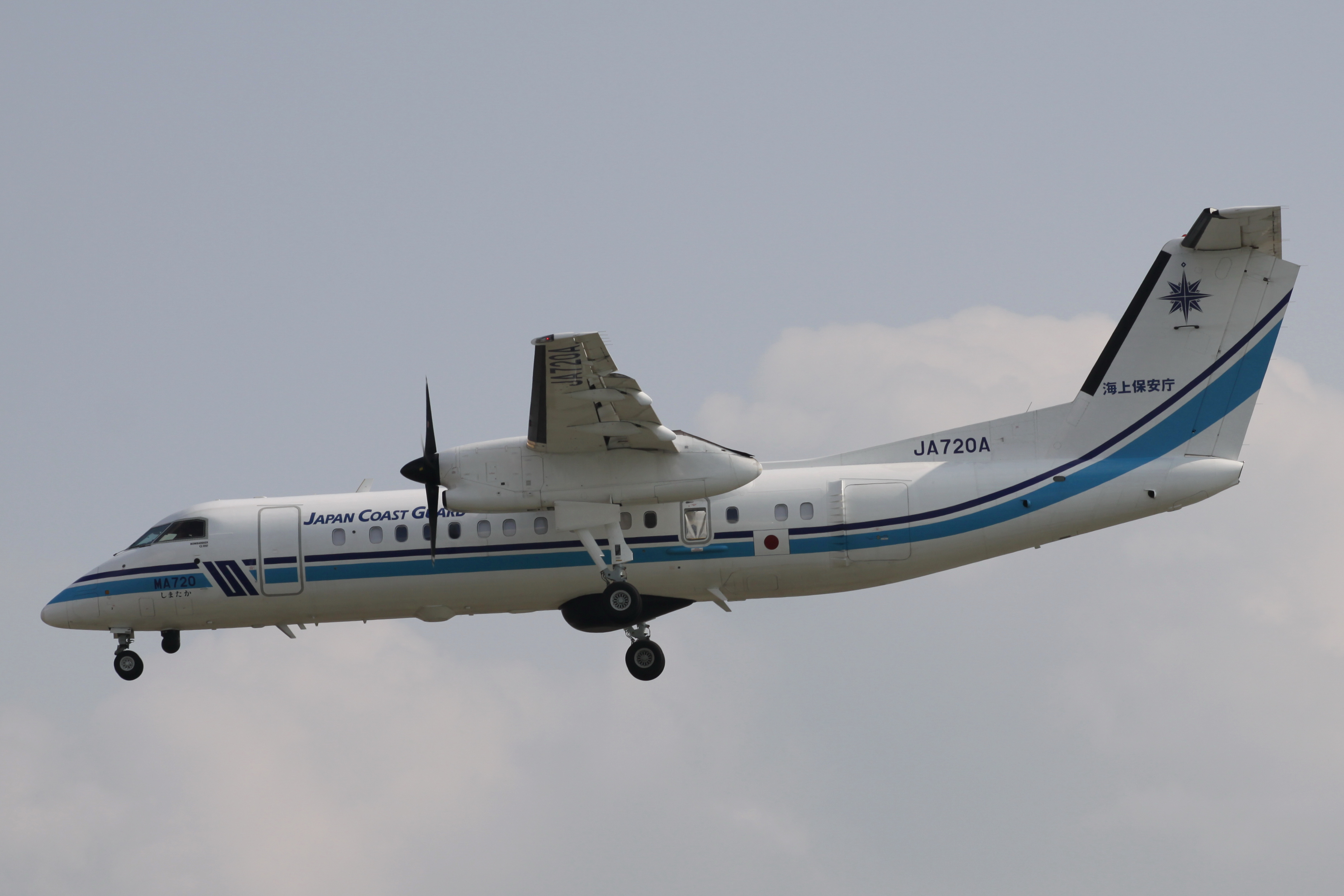
Japan Coast Guard Bombardier DHC8-300

=== Vehicles ===
A "Onebox Car" used as a Patrol Car of the Japan Coast Guard in Kagoshima.

The JCG does not have any emergency vehicles, but civilian vans are used for transporting goods and personnel, while some minibuses such as the Nissan Civilian and Toyota Coaster with are used for transporting prisoners or illegal immigrants that were captured by the Coast Guard.

=== Armaments ===
==== Vessel-mounted weapons ====
Because the Allied countries wanted to maintain the disarmament of Japan, the weapons allowed to be carried by the MSA were restricted to only small arms in the earliest days. However, following the outbreak of the Korean War, the need to strengthen the security capability of Japan became necessary, and starting in 1954, the installation of larger guns on MSA ships began.

Initially ships of the MSA were permitted to carry Mark 22 3"/50 caliber gun for large vessels (PL type), Bofors 40 mm L/60 guns for medium and small size ships (PM and PS type), and Oerlikon 20 mm L/70 guns were mounted on small patrol boats (ARB type and auxiliary submarine chasers). Actually, however, the number of 40 mm guns was insufficient, and many of the PS type had 20 mm guns installed instead.

From the 1970s, substitution of these old guns began. The 3-inch guns were retired by 1979, as their age was progressing. Also from FY1978 an Oerlikon 35 mm L/90 gun was substituted on ships replacing the Bofors 40 mm L/60 gun, and from the FY1979 ships forward, the JM61-M 20 mm rotary cannons were installed on MSA ships in lieu of the earlier Oerlikon 20 mm guns.

In the beginning, only a few of the 35 mm guns had a limited remote control function, most of these guns were manually controlled. Then, full-scale remote operation and automatic tracking function were included in the guns mounted on the PLH Shikishima introduced in 1989. In addition, the 20 mm gun systems were added to the standard equipment list as JM61-RFS, and they have been mounted on many patrol vessels. And in order to counter the heavily armed North Korean naval trawlers in the event of an engagement, most recently PLs have been equipped with a 40 mm L/70 gun or 30 mm chain gun remotely controlled with an optical director.

==== Personal weapons ====
In the early days, MSA officers were issued WWII Nambu Type 14 semi-auto pistols and M1 rifles. From the 1960s, the old semi-auto Nambu pistols were replaced by newly built M60 revolvers. Some JCG security units have been equipped with modern Smith & Wesson Model 5906 TSW pistols. It's been reported that the Smith & Wesson 360J revolvers are also used. The P228 is used by the SST.

The M1 rifle was replaced after the 1960s and the JCG were issued Howa Type 64 rifles. From 1990, their weapons were updated again to the Howa Type 89.

The SST is equipped with Heckler & Koch MP5A5/SD6 submachine guns. The Howa M1500 has been adopted as a sniper rifle, and the SST has also adopted anti-materiel rifles manufactured by the McMillan Firearms.

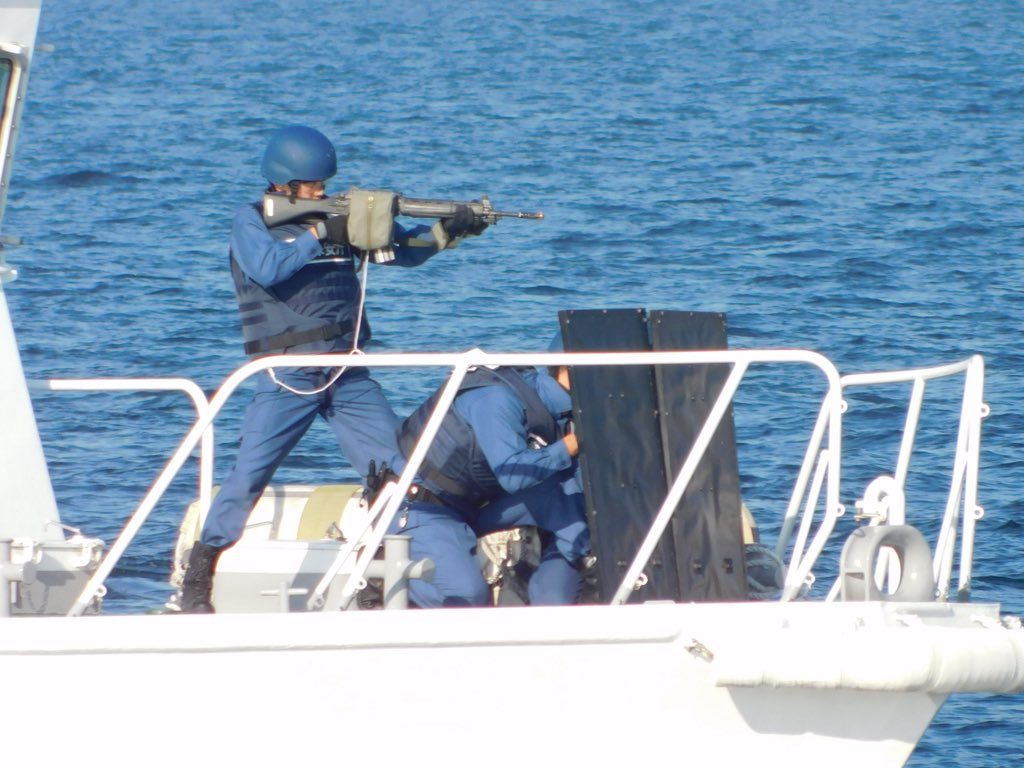
An officer holding a Type 89 rifle at the bow of a patrol boat.

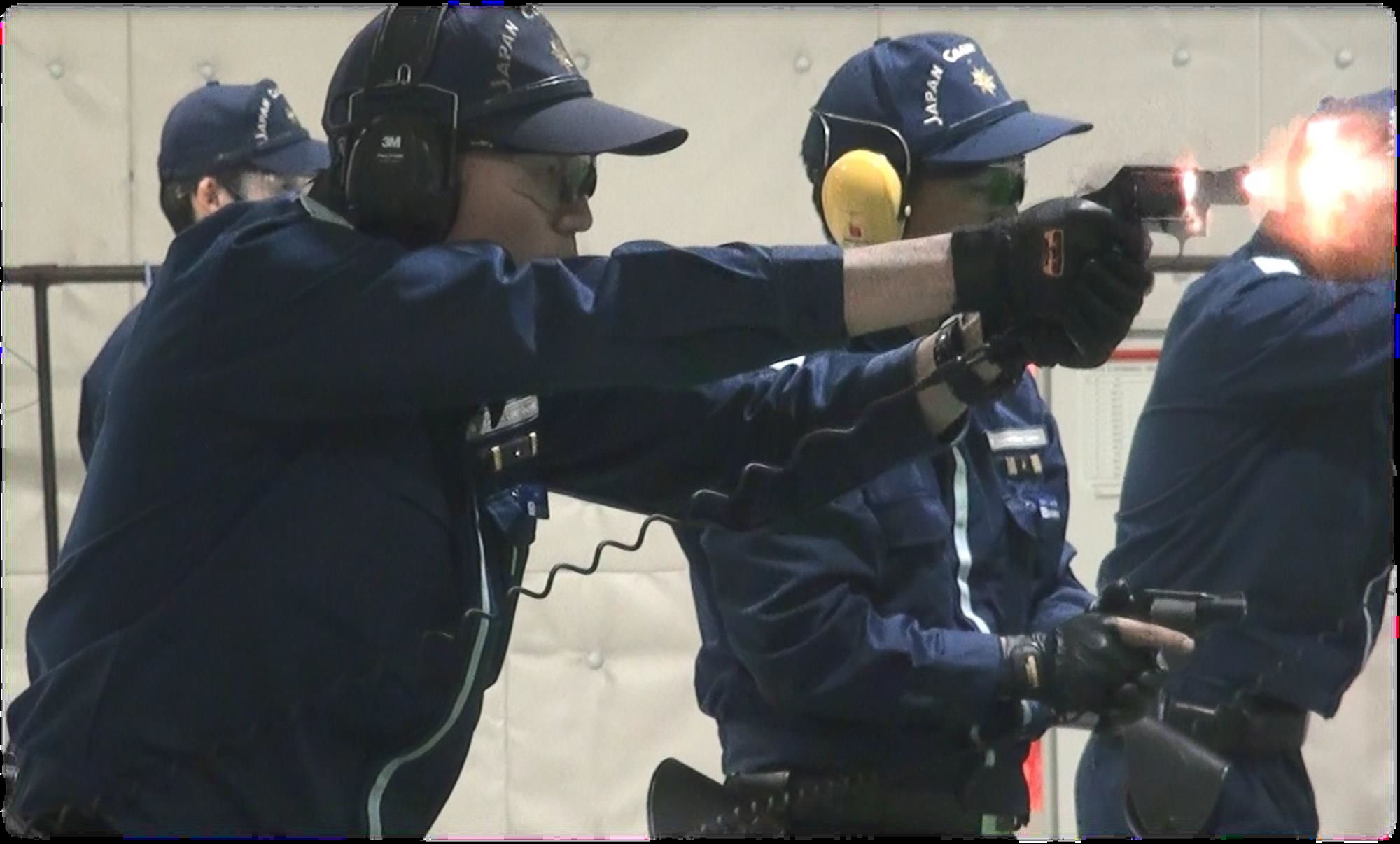
Shooting drills with revolvers.

== JCG museums ==
- Japan Coast Guard Museum – a museum dedicated to the Japanese Coast Guard in Kure, Hiroshima Prefecture.
- Japan Coast Guard Museum Yokohama – a museum dedicated to maritime security and the Japan Coast Guard. It is in Naka-ku, Yokohama, Kanagawa Prefecture.
- NYK Maritime Museum – dedicated to the maritime history of Japan and of the museum's operator, shipping company Nippon Yūsen Kabushiki Kaisha ("NYK Line")

== See also ==
- Japan Coast Guard Academy
- Big Joys, Small Sorrows
- Umizaru
- Umizaru 2: Test of Trust
- North Pacific Coast Guard Agencies Forum
- DAICHI (ALOS)

== Sources ==
=== Books ===
- Asanaga, Youichirou; Ōtsuka, Yukitaka (1995). Japan Maritime Safety Agency – their vessels and aviation. Seizando-shoten publishing co., ltd. ISBN 4-425-77041-2.
- Ball, Desmond; Tanter, Richard (2015). The Tools of Owatatsumi: Japan's Ocean Surveillance and Coastal Defence Capabilities. ANU Press. ISBN 978-1-925022-27-8. JSTOR j.ctt13wwvvt.20.
- Liff, Adam P. (2020). "ch.12 China's Maritime Gray-Zone Operations in the East China Aea and Japan's Response". 中国の海洋強国戦略:グレーゾーン作戦と展開 [China's Maritime Gray Zone Operations]. Translated by Sugimoto, Masahiko. Hara-shobō. pp. 222–247. ISBN 978-4562057450.
- Maritime Safety Agency (1979). 30 years history of Japan Coast Guard. Maritime Safety Agency Foundation. ASIN B000J8HCXQ.
- Komine, Takao; Sakamoto, Shinichi (2005). SST - the Japan Coast Guard Special Forces (in Japanese). Namiki-shobou. ISBN 978-4890631933.
- Walter, John (2023). Nambu Pistols:Japanese military handguns 1900–45. , New York, NY: Osprey Publishing. ISBN 9781472855428.

=== Articles ===
- Hasegawa, Hiroyasu (2010). "The Difference of Speculation in Japan-U.S.Government Around Establishment of the Japan Coast Guard" (PDF). Crisis & Risk Management Review (18). Crisis & Risk Management Society of Japan: 11–20.
- Matsuo, Toshinari (2021). 中国海警法の施行― 海警に付与された武器使用権限 [Enforcement of China's Coast Guard Law – Authority to Use Weapons Granted to China Coast Guard] (PDF) (Report). JMSDF Staff College.
- Miyake, Norio (November 2009). "Japan Coast Guard: Past, Present, and Future". Ships of the World (714). Kaijin-sha: 97–105. NAID 40016812500.
- Nakanomyo, Masami (October 2015). "History of Shipboard Guns on JCG's Patrol Vessels". Ships of the World (825). Kaijin-sha: 168–173. NAID 40020597434.
- Yoneda, Kenji (July 2016). "JCG's Special Teams Facing a New Phase". Ships of the World (840). Kaijin-sha: 152–157. NAID 40020863525.
