= Kyodo Television =

Japanese television production company

Kyodo Television, Ltd.
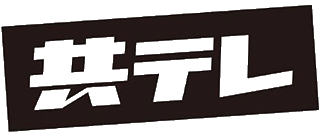

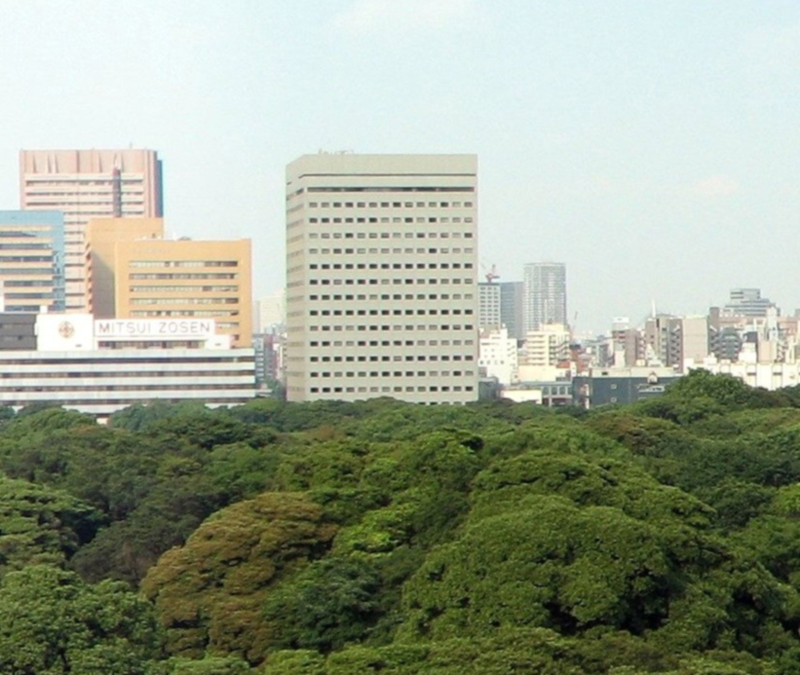
- Hamarikyū Parkside Place building (center)
- Native name: 株式会社共同テレビジョン
- Type: Kabushiki kaisha
- Industry: Television production
- Genre: Television production
- Founded: July 28, 1958
- Headquarters: Main Office; 104-0045; Tokyo, Chūō-ku, Tsukiji 5-6-10; Hamarikyū Parkside Place; 11th & 12th Floors Fuji TV Annex; 135-0091; Tokyo, Minato-ku, Daiba 2-4-8; Fuji Television
- Area served: Japan
- Products: anime, drama, news
- Revenue: ¥18,200,007,692 (as of March 2007)
- Number of employees: 165 (as of March 2007)
- Parent: Fuji Television
- Website: www.kyodo-tv.co.jp

Kyodo Television (株式会社共同テレビジョン, Kabushiki Kaisha Kyōdo Terebijon) is a Japanese television production company founded on July 28, 1958 as Kyodo Television News (共同テレビジョンニュース社, Kyōdo Terebijon Nyūsu-sha). It is a subsidiary of Fuji Television, one of the largest television networks in Japan. Kyodo produces a wide variety of television shows, including drama, news, anime series, and other content.

Originally a part of Kyodo News, Kyodo Television was formed in 1958 through the joint financing of Tōkai Television Broadcasting, Kansai Telecasting Corporation, Nihon Kyōiku TV (NET, now TV Asahi), NHK, and other smaller partners as Kyodo Television News.

Shortly after the new company was formed and began production, NET and NHK withdrew their financial support from the venture. From this point, the company began producing works mainly for the Fuji TV network. In 1966, with the inauguration of Fuji News Network, Kyodo was producing television programs solely for Fuji TV.

The name of the company was changed to the present Kyodo Television in 1970, and the company began producing a variety of programming for the Fuji TV network.
