= Yōichi Komori =

Japanese academic

Yōichi Komori (小森 陽一, Komori Yōichi; born May 14, 1953 in Tokyo, Japan) is a critic of Japanese modern literature and a social activist in Japan. He is currently a professor at the University of Tokyo, Japan.

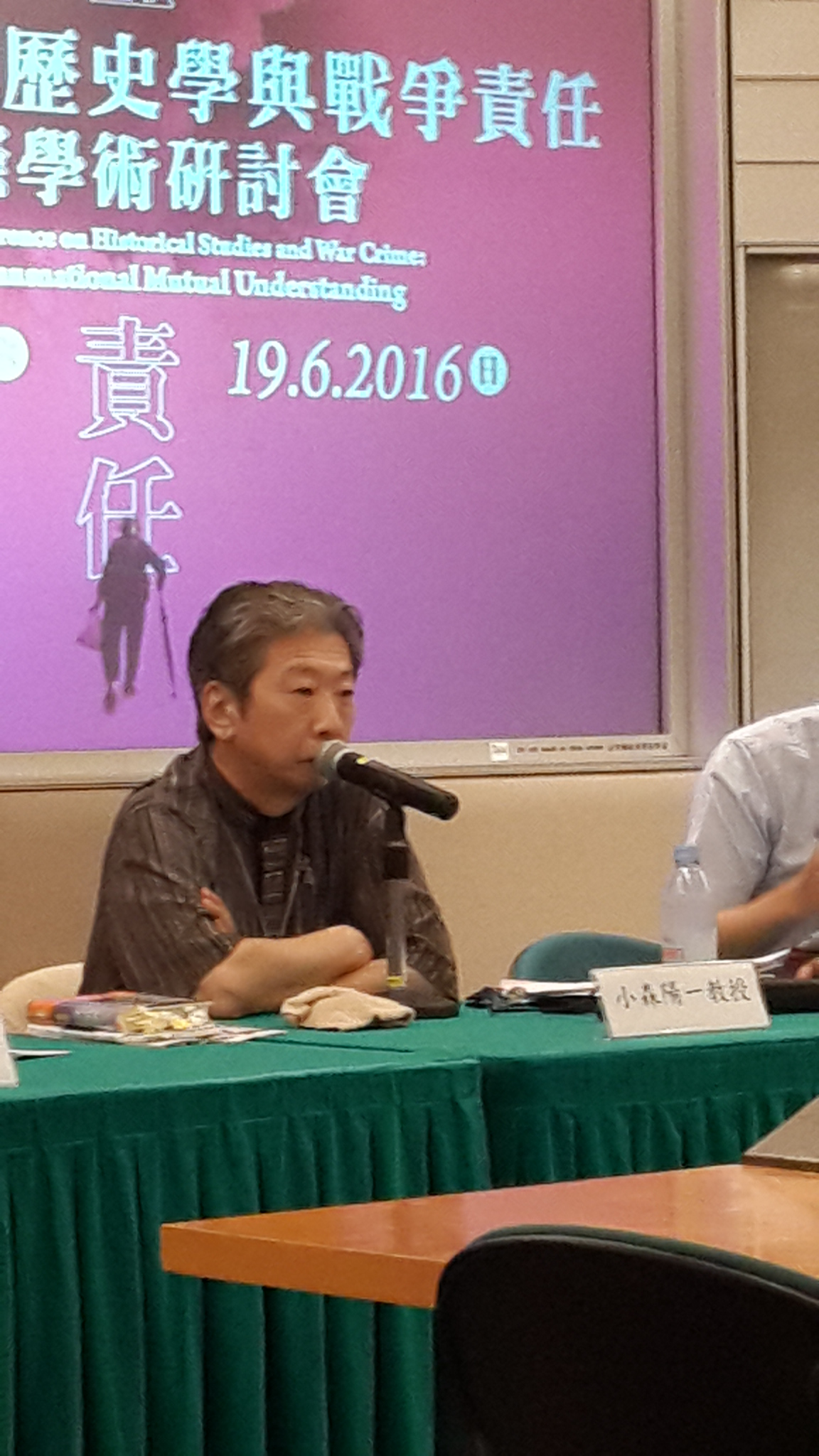
Photo of Yōichi Komori at CityU of Hong Kong

== Early life ==
Yoichi Komori was born into a family of a professional political activists on May 14, 1953, in Tokyo, Japan. His father Yoshio Komori (1926–2008, 小森良夫), had been the representative of Japanese Communist Party to the general headquarter of the World Federation of Trade Unions (Japanese: 世界労働組合連盟) in Praha, Czechoslovakia from 1961 to 1965 and Yoshio had been elected as the central member of Japanese Communist Party from 1977(1). Yoichi Komori’s mother Kyoko (b.1930, 小森香子), is a poet and a communist social activist. Komori Yoichi’s grandfather，Shinobu Komori (1911–1962, 小森忍), was a well-known artist in sculpture and ceramics in modern Japanese art history.

== Education ==
Komori had spent four years in Praha with his parents, where he received his elementary education in the Elementary School Attached to Russian Embassy and he returned to Japan in 1965. This experience had brought vexation on him after he returned from Praha to Tokyo in 1965 for his poor Japanese. Komori received his B.A. and master's degree in Japanese Literature at the national Hokkaido University, Japan. He finished his Ph.D. Course at the same university in 1982 and soon after that he got a tenured position as a lecturer at Seijo University in Tokyo, where he had been teaching till he moved to the University of Tokyo in 1988. He became full Professor of the University of Tokyo in 1998.

== Career ==
Yōichi Komori made his debut with the following two influential books in the academia in Japan, which were published at the same time in March 1988, Kōzō toshiteno katari [Narrative as structure] and Buntai toshiteno monogatari [Stories as style]. With the new critical approaches and perspectives drawn from narratology and semiotics of Mikhail Mikhailovich Bakhtin and so on, he had made a new and convincing interpretation on the genealogy of Japanese modern novels in 1890s. He was influenced by literary critic Ai Maeda (1931–87, 前田愛), the author of Kindai dokusha no seiritsu [The genealogy of modern readership] (1973), Toshi kūkan no bungaku [Text and the city: essays on Japanese modernity] (1982) and so on. As a literary historian, he is also known as a researcher on the literary works of Soseki Natsume (1867–1916, 夏目漱石), the father of modern Japanese literature.

The critic Masaki Nakamasa (b.1963) points out that “a left turn” for Japanese postmodernism took place in 1992 or 1993, and can be seen in some postmodernist exponents like Tetsuya Takahashi, Yōichi Komori, Hidetaka Ishida, Tetsu Ukai (b.1955) and so on, who draw on modern European, and especially French, thoughts to criticize Japanese conservative power’s whitewashing of wartime crimes, the conservatives’ tendency to suppress historicity. Yōichi Komori represents the typical political application of postmodern theory, who draws on new methodology like semiotic theory, Jacques Lacan’s psychoanalysis and so forth to dig into historicity through consciousness and subconsciousness. In this sense Komori probably identifies himself as a historian in a broad sense.

Yoichi Komori is also a well-known social activist in Japan. He had been the leading intellectual who protested against the injuring party’s toning down or deleting Japan’s history of invasion of East Asia in the “new Japanese history textbook controversies” from 1993 to early 2003. He is also one of the key founding members of the Article 9 Association (A9A), a nationwide civic movement against the conservative revision of the pacifist Japanese Constitution. A9A was established in June 2005 in the names of 9 famous senior intellectuals including Kenzaburō Ōe (b.1935，大江健三郎), the Nobel Prize Laureate for Literature in 1994, the critic Shūichi Katō (1919–2008,加藤周一), Shunsuke Tsurumi (1922–2015, 鶴見俊輔), a well-known philosopher and an anti-war activist, and so on. As the chief of the Secretariat of A9A, Komori has been desperately attempting to expand further A9A groups irrespective of ideological or political differences and organize a majority of the public in defense of the peace constitution.
