= Shūhō Satō =

Japanese manga artist

- Born: 佐藤 秀峰; December 8, 1973; Ikeda, Hokkaidō, Japan
- Known for: Manga
- Website: http://satoshuho.com/

Shūhō Satō (佐藤 秀峰, Satō Shūhō; born December 8, 1973 in Ikeda, Hokkaidō, Japan) is a Japanese manga artist. He won the Japan Media Arts Festival Manga Award for his work Say Hello to Black Jack.

His assistants have included his wife, manga artist Tomomi Satō, as well as Masasumi Kakizaki (one year before his debut), Takahisa Shiratori, Itsunari Fujii, Eiji Nomura, Takashi Yoshida, and Kōjirō Umezawa.

== Biography ==
Satō is left-handed, and has had a good sense and love of drawing since childhood. He graduated from Hokkaido Sapporo Nishi High School. While enrolled in Musashino Art University and studying in both the Department of Imaging Arts and Sciences and the Department of Sculpture, Satō decided he wanted to pursue a career as a manga artist and subsequently dropped out before graduating.

He worked as an assistant to both Nobuyuki Fukumoto and Tsutomu Takahashi, and made his professional debut in 1998 in Weekly Young Sunday with his work Congratulations (おめでとォ!, Omedeto!), though his Promised Land, which was a special selection at the 1997 Afternoon Four Seasons Awards, was technically his debut. Two works, Umizaru and Say Hello to Black Jack have been adapted very faithfully as television dramas and films.

Satō won the 2002 Japan Media Arts Festival Manga Award for his work Say Hello to Black Jack.

Satō drew the cover art for Kazuyoshi Saito's June 2007 single "Kimi wa Boku no Nani wo Suki ni Nattandarou/Very Very Strong -Eine Kleine-".

== Works ==
- Umizaru (1999–2001, 12 volumes, Weekly Young Sunday, Shogakukan, research done by Yōichi Komori)
- Say Hello to Black Jack (2002–2006, 13 volumes, Weekly Morning, Kodansha, has sold over 10 million copies)
- New Say Hello to Black Jack (since 2007, Big Comic Spirits, Shogakukan)
- The Death-Defying Negotiator M (2003, 1 volume, Kindai Mahjongg Gold, Takeshobo)
- The Isle of Tokkō (2006, 1 volume, Weekly Manga Times, Houbunsha)

=== As writer ===
- Oto (art by Eiji Nomura, since 2004, Weekly Young Sunday, Shogakukan)
