= Japanese ship Mizuho =

Three naval vessels of Japan have been named Mizuho:

- Japanese seaplane carrier Mizuho, commissioned into Imperial Japanese Navy on 1939 and sunk on 2 May 1942 by USS Drum.
- Japanese patrol vessel Mizuho (PLH-21), lead ship of Mizuho-class patrol vessel of Japan Coast Guard; being renamed to Fusō in 2019 with the commissioning of PLH-41.
- Japanese patrol vessel Mizuho (PLH-41), commissioned into Japan Coast Guard on 22 August 2019.
