= Japanese ship Fusō =

Three naval vessels of Japan have been named Fusō:

- Japanese ironclad Fusō, an ironclad warship of the Imperial Japanese Navy that fought in the Battle of Yalu River.
- Japanese battleship Fusō, lead ship of the Fusō-class.
- Japanese patrol boat Fusō, renamed from Mizuho in 2019 and lead ship of Mizuho-class patrol vessel.
