= Special Tasks and Rescue (Malaysia Coast Guard) =

Malaysian Coast Guard's Special Operations Command

Special Tasks and Rescue Team
- Pasukan Tindakan Khas dan Penyelamat (Malay) ڤاسوكن تيندقن خاص دان ڤڽلامت ماريتيم (Malay)
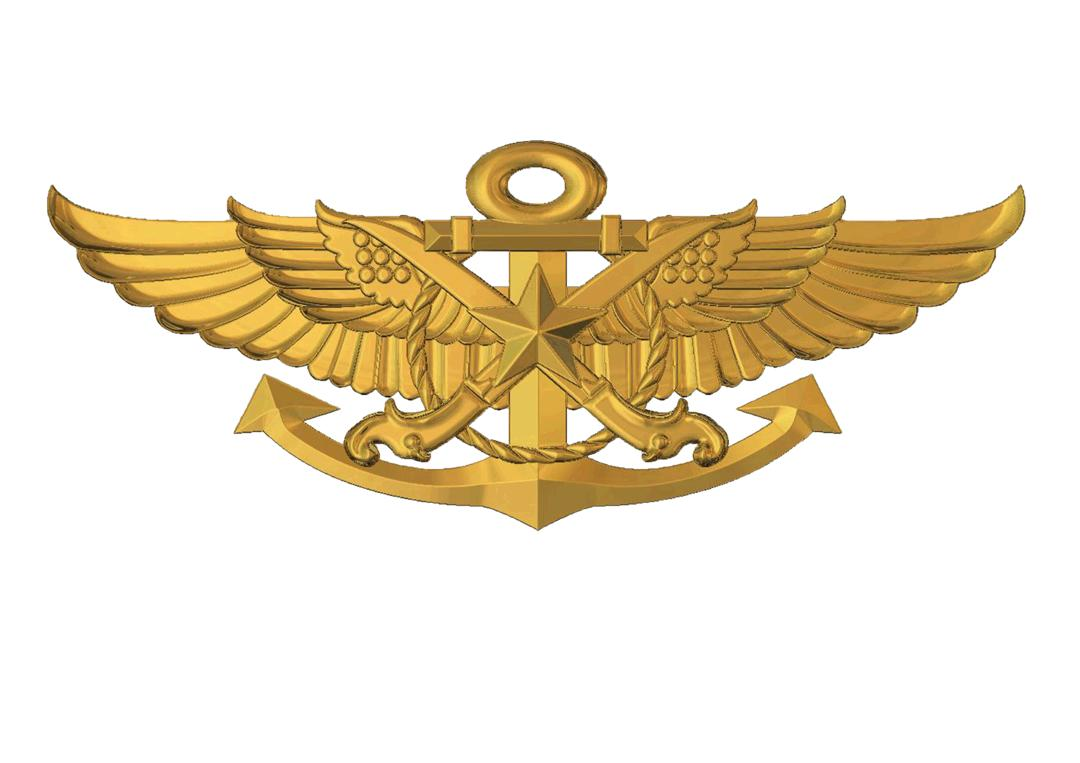
- Special Tasks And Rescue Team's Special Operations Insignia
- Active: 31 March 2005; 21 years ago
- Country: Malaysia
- Agency: Malaysia Coast Guard
- Type: Special forces
- Headquarters: Malaysian Maritime Enforcement Agency Headquarters, Putrajaya
- Motto: Bersatu & Berjuang; Unite & Fight
- Common name: "STAR Team", "PTK", "Komando Maritim", "Penyelam Penyelamat"
- Abbreviation: STAR

Structure
- Squadrons: 3

Commanders
- Current commander: Capt. (M) Syuzefril bin Mat Noor
- Notable commanders: Capt. (M) Abim Sungom

Notables
- Significant operation(s): 2013 Lahad Datu standoff; 2017 MT Orkim Harmony hijacking; 2018 MT Tanker MGT1 hijacking
- Anniversaries: 31 March

The Special Tasks and Rescue Team (Malay: Pasukan Tindakan Khas dan Penyelamat, Jawi: ڤاسوكن تيندقن خاص دان ڤڽلامت ماريتيم), abbreviated as STAR, serves as the command for elite maritime special operations and underwater divers within the Malaysia Coast Guard. It was established as a rapid reaction force for emergencies within the maritime zone of Malaysia.

STAR plays a crucial role alongside the Royal Malaysian Navy's Naval Special Forces (PASKAL) and the Royal Malaysian Police's Marine Assault Team (UNGERIN) in addressing piracy, terrorism, and robbery threats at sea, responding promptly before reinforcements arrive from the Royal Malaysian Police's Marine Operations Force, Malaysia Coast Guard, and the Royal Malaysian Navy.

Additionally, STAR shares responsibilities in maritime search and rescue with the Royal Malaysian Air Force's RMAF Special Forces (PASKAU) Maritime Para Rescue Squadron.

== History ==
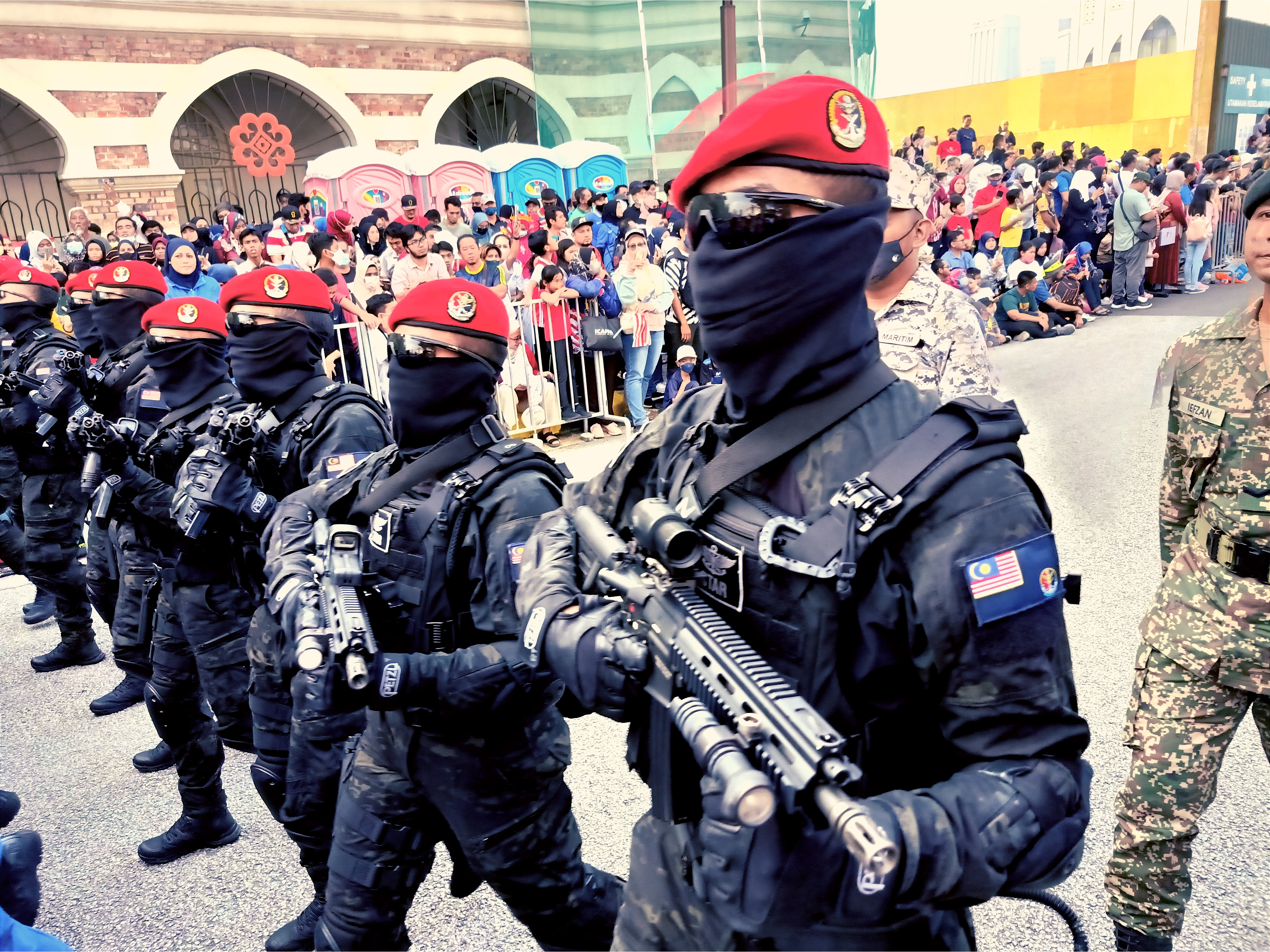
Operatives of the Special Tasks and Rescue (STAR) showcased their prowess during the 65th Merdeka Day parade in Kuala Lumpur, armed with Heckler & Koch HK416 rifles. The operatives also unveiled their new camouflage pattern.

=== Established as Coast Guard Special Forces ===
On 31 March 2005, the Pasukan Tindakan Khas Agensi Penguatkuasaan Maritim Malaysia (PTK-APMM) (lit. 'Malaysian Maritime Enforcement Agency Special Action Team'; MMEA-SAT) was founded. Several commandos from the Royal Malaysian Air Force's (RMAF) PASKAU and the Royal Malaysian Navy's PASKAL were reassigned to the Malaysia Coast Guard (MCG) to constitute the inaugural STAR team. The concept of MCG's special forces is modelled after the United States Coast Guard's (USCG) Maritime Safety and Security Team and Maritime Security Response Team, as well as the Japan Coast Guard's Special Security Team.

==== Initiate recruitment within the Malaysian Maritime Enforcement Agency ====
For a few years, recruitment was exclusively open to special forces from any service within the Malaysian Armed Forces. However, the PTK-APMM later decided to recruit its members internally within the agency. In April 2008, 25 coast guard members successfully completed the preparatory course held at Pulau Indah in Selangor. This included one commissioned officer, three senior non-commissioned officers (SNCO), and one non-commissioned officer (NCO). The trainees for this course were selected from the PTK-APMM selection test held from 19 to 24 December 2008.

In July 2009, 24 trainees successfully completed the RMAF Basic Commando Course, forming the pioneer team of homegrown STAR special operations commandos. According to the Deputy Director Chief of Malaysian Maritime Operations, VAdm. (M) Dato' Noor Aziz Yunnan, the team needed an additional 200 members by the end of the year.

=== Plans were made to incorporate rescue elements ===
On 25 March 2009, the Malaysian Maritime Enforcement Agency (MMEA) assumed control of the Malaysia Rescue Coordinating Centre (MRCC) from the Marine Department Malaysia (Malay: Jabatan Laut Malaysia). Subsequently, the MMEA became responsible for managing all emergency calls and providing appropriate responses to emergencies within the Malaysian maritime zone. The centre was renamed the 'Malaysia Maritime Communication Centre' (MMCC), and its sub-centres were designated as 'Maritime Rescue Sub-Centres' (MRSC). To avoid confusion with international shipping operators, the name was later changed to the Maritime Rescue Coordination Centre (MRCC), maintaining the same abbreviation as the original name.

In conjunction with this, the MMEA established the Maritime Search and Rescue (Malay: CARILAMAT Maritim) unit and initiated the formation of MMEA Rescue Divers, placing them under Maritime Search and Rescue to support the centre and sub-centres. The agency also planned to integrate the PTK-APMM into Maritime Search and Rescue, forming a unified unit that combined both PTK-APMM and MMEA Rescue Divers. As a result, PTK-APMM was renamed Pasukan Tindakan Khas dan Penyelamat Agensi Penguatkuasaan Maritim Malaysia in Malay, or Special Tasks and Rescue Team in English. Despite the renaming, the merger of the Malaysia Coast Guard Rescue Divers with the Special Tasks and Rescue Team did not occur until October 2023. (Note: On 28 April 2017, the Malaysian Maritime Enforcement Agency was officially rebranded as the 'Malaysia Coast Guard' for international identification.) Prior to 2023, the Malaysia Coast Guard Rescue Divers continued to operate under the MRCC and MRSC.

=== Upgraded to the status of a Special Operations Command for the Coast Guard ===
The Special Tasks and Rescue were elevated to the Special Operations Command for the Malaysia Coast Guard in September 2023. The commandos under STAR were divided into two squadrons: the Assault Squadron of the Malay Peninsula and the Assault Squadron of Sabah and Sarawak.

=== Rescue Divers were integrated into the Special Tasks and Rescue ===
In October 2023, all rescue divers units were integrated into the Special Tasks and Rescue, forming the Malaysia Coast Guard Diving Squadron. With this integration, the number of squadrons under STAR increased to three.

== National special operations force ==
In 2016, the main counter-terrorism commandos in Malaysia were consolidated into one special operations task force. Several commandos from the STAR were selected to be part of the National Special Operations Force (NSOF). The NSOF was disbanded in October 2018.

== Roles and capabilities ==
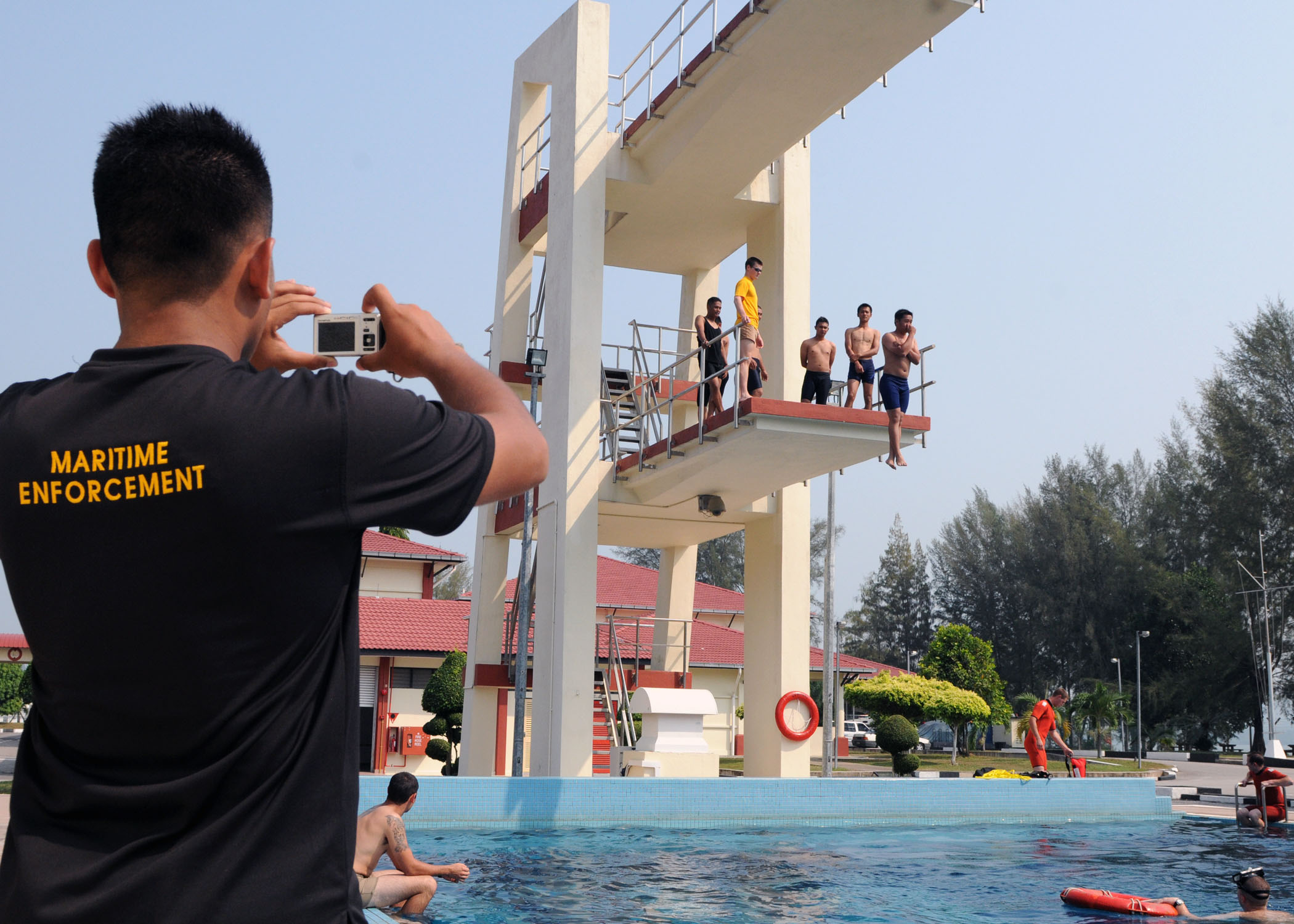
MCG Rescue Divers underwent training from USCG Aviation Survival Technicians and U.S. Navy Naval Aircrewmen during CARAT 2012.

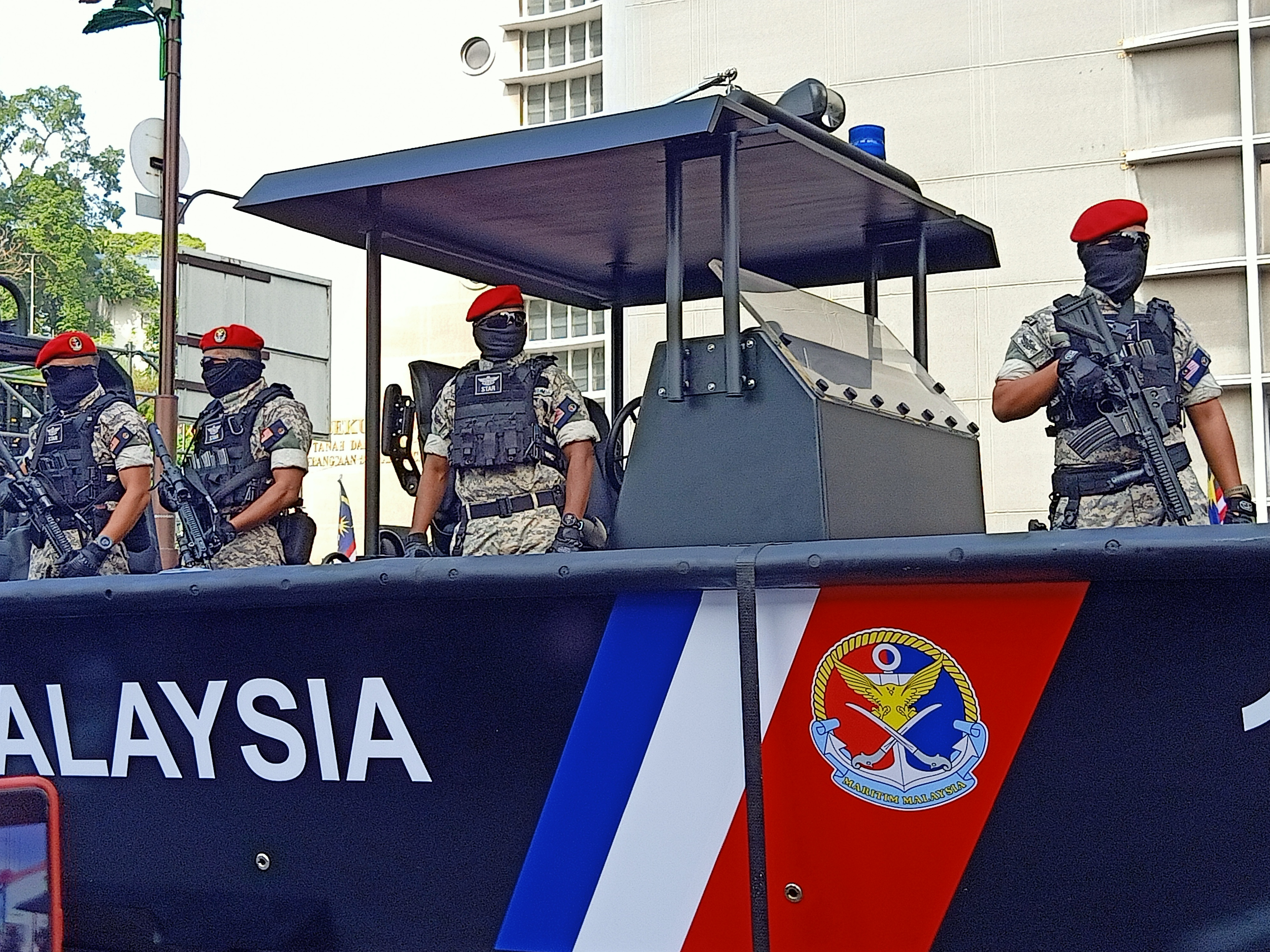
Special operations commandos of the Malaysian Coast Guard's Special Tasks and Rescue (STAR) unit were seen aboard a patrol boat during the 65th Merdeka Day.

The Special Tasks and Rescue Team (STAR) was established to support the agency in enforcing laws and regulations in the Maritime Zone of Malaysia. The STAR is assigned two main tasks: special rescue operations and special operations for forced boarding. The primary functions of the STAR include:

1. Conducting search and rescue operations in challenging conditions.
2. Performing forced boarding operations on vessels.
3. Countering terrorism and piracy.
4. Conducting surface and underwater rescue operations.

The STAR Teams are trained to perform the following:

- Maritime interdiction and law enforcement
- Force protection
- CBRN-E (chemical, biological, radiological or nuclear) detection
- Maritime search and rescue
- Port Protection/Anti-Sabotage
- Underwater Port Security
- Canine Handling Teams (Explosive detection)
- Tactical Boat Operations
- Non-Permissive Boarding Capability
- Counter-Terrorism
- Vertical Insertion (Fast roping)
- Hook and Climb

== Structures ==
The headquarters of the Special Tasks and Rescue (STAR) is located within the Malaysia Coast Guard (MCG) Headquarters in Putrajaya. The STAR command comprises three squadrons strategically distributed across Malaysia to ensure rapid response capabilities. Currently, the command oversees three distinct specialised units:

Special Tasks and Rescue
Unit's name (English)	Unit's name (Malay)	Abbreviation	Roles and speciality
Malaysia Coast Guard Special Tasks and Rescue Team	Pasukan Tindakan Khas Maritim Malaysia	STAR Team	Maritime special operations, counter-terrorism, and boarding operations
Malaysia Coast Guard Rescue Swimmers	Perenang Penyelamat Maritim Malaysia		Heliborne maritime search and rescue (SAR) and medical evacuation
Malaysia Coast Guard Rescue Divers	Penyelam Penyelamat Maritim Malaysia		Underwater search and rescue, hull inspections, and maritime recovery

The STAR Team and Rescue Divers are organised into three special operations squadrons. In contrast, the MCG Rescue Swimmers are permanently stationed at MCG airbases to facilitate immediate deployment via aviation assets. The current structures are as followings:

=== Current structures ===
Structure of the Special Tasks and Rescue Team.

Currently, the Special Tasks and Rescue consists of the following units:

- Headquarters, Special Tasks and Rescue. At the Malaysia Coast Guard Headquarters in Putrajaya
  - Assault Squadron of the Malay Peninsular (Maritime special operations). At Klang in Selangor
  - Assault Squadron of Sabah and Sarawak (Maritime special operations). At Kota Kinabalu in Sabah
  - Malaysia Coast Guard Diving Squadron
    - Diving School (Underwater rescue divers & training unit). At Sultan Ahmad Shah Coast Guard Academy in Pahang
    - Johor Diving Unit (Underwater rescue divers). At Johor Bahru in Johor
    - Perak Diving Unit (Underwater rescue divers). At Lumut in Perak
    - Sabah Diving Unit (Underwater rescue divers). At Kota Kinabalu in Sabah
    - Sarawak Diving Unit (Underwater rescue divers). At Kuching in Sarawak

=== Team level ===
Each STAR Assault team consists of 25 commandos. The STAR teams are distributed across all Maritime Districts (MD, Malay: Daerah Maritim—DM) in the country.

== Uniforms and insignia ==
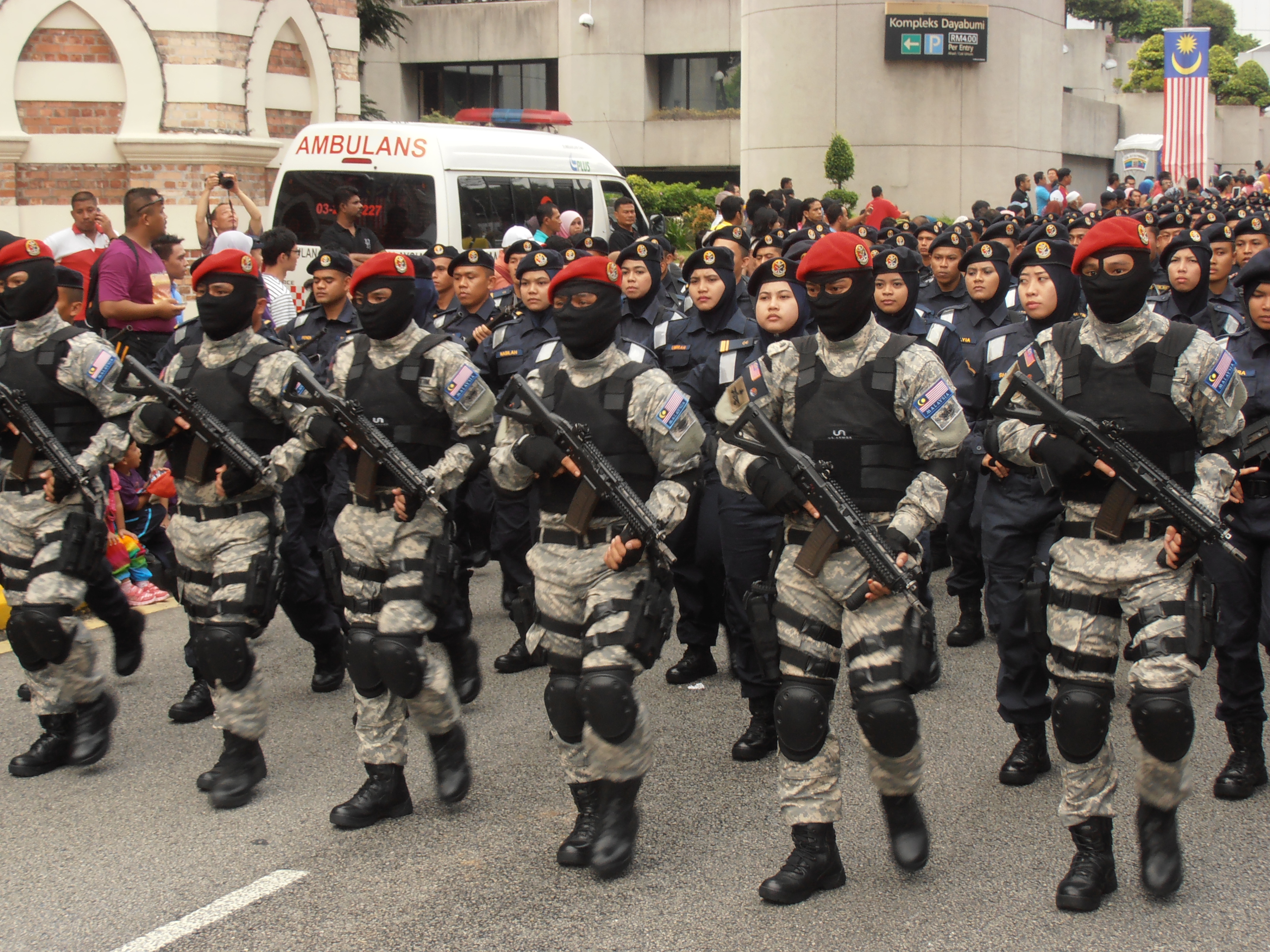
Commandos of the Special Tasks and Rescue (STAR) Team donned the new red berets as they participated in the 57th Merdeka Day Parade.

=== Beret ===
==== Scarlet red beret ====
Commando-trained personnel of the STAR Team wear scarlet red berets to distinguish themselves from other Malaysian special forces. Officially designated as the Beret Merah Saga Gerak Khas (lit. 'Special Forces Scarlet Red Beret'), the headgear adopts the specific shade of red featured in the Malaysia Coast Guard (MCG) logo. Before the adoption of this current colour, STAR special operations commandos wore a beret in a blue shade known as "Midnight Express" .

==== Navy blue beret ====
Members of the STAR command who have not undergone commando training wear the standard navy blue beret. This headgear is identical to that worn by other regular units within the MCG.

=== Insignia ===
As the STAR command encompasses three distinct units with specialised roles, each is identified by its own unique insignia. These badges are awarded upon the successful completion of their respective training pipelines and signify the specific expertise of the wearer.

==== STAR Special Operations Insignia ====
As a maritime special operations unit, the STAR command draws significant influence from the Royal Malaysian Navy’s Naval Special Forces (PASKAL). All qualified commandos wear the golden STAR Insignia above the left breast pocket, a placement similar to the PASKAL Trimedia (the Malaysian equivalent of the U.S. Navy SEALs "Trident" insignia).

The components of the insignia represent:

- Wings: The traditional symbol for airborne and paradrop capabilities.
- Rope and Anchor: Traditional symbols representing a naval and maritime unit.
- Crossed Bugis Badiks: Representing the heritage of skilful sailors and warriors.
- Five-Pointed Star: Representing "STAR", the acronym for Special Tasks and Rescue.

==== Rescue Swimmer Insignia ====
The design of the MCG Rescue Swimmer insignia was influenced by the United States Coast Guard and the Japan Coast Guard. The badge is modelled after the Aviation Survival Technician's Rescue Swimmer Wings but adapted for the Malaysian context. This gold-coloured insignia is worn in the same manner as the STAR Special Operations Insignia.

The components of the Rescue Swimmer Insignia represent:

- Wings: Symbolising the unit's heliborne and airborne search and rescue (SAR) capabilities.
- Rope and Anchor: Traditional symbols representing a naval and maritime unit.
- Lifebuoy: Representing the primary mission of saving lives at sea.
- Four-Pointed Star: A dual symbol representing both the "STAR" acronym and a compass rose for navigation.

==== Coast Guard Divers Skills Badge ====
Coast Guard personnel who successfully complete the MCG Rescue Divers' training pipeline are awarded a bronze Coast Guard Divers Skills Badge. The design draws inspiration from the U.S. Army special operations diver badge and is worn on the breast pocket.

The components of the Divers Skills Badge represent:

- Diving Mask, Rebreather, and Swim-fins: Symbolising expertise in professional diving and underwater operations.
- Rope and Anchor: Traditional symbols representing a naval and maritime unit.
- Lifebuoy: Representing the primary mission of saving lives at sea.
- Diving Knife: Representing the bravery required to operate in hazardous underwater environments.
- "Penyelam APMM" Inscription: The Malay designation for Malaysia Coast Guard Divers.

=== Shoulder tabs ===
Personnel within the Special Tasks and Rescue command wear distinctive shoulder tabs on the right sleeve of their uniforms to indicate their specific qualification and unit affiliation.

- STAR Team: Qualified special operations commandos wear a tab embroidered with "STAR".
- Rescue Swimmers and Divers: Personnel who have successfully completed the diving pipeline wear a tab embroidered with "PENYELAM" (Malay for "Diver").

=== Uniforms ===
In Malaysia, elite units traditionally adopt unique uniforms to establish a distinct identity. Within the STAR command, there are three specialised uniforms unique to each unit's operational role.

==== Universal Camouflage Pattern (UCP) Battle Dress Uniform ====
STAR Team commandos utilise the Universal Camouflage Pattern (UCP) for their field uniform. In 2009, STAR became the first unit in Malaysia to adopt digital camouflage. While the unit showcased a new dark blue digital camouflage pattern during the 2022 Merdeka Day parade, as of 2025, the commandos continue to utilise the original UCP field uniforms for active operations.

==== Papaya Orange Wetsuit ====
To distinguish their specific role, MCG Rescue Divers don papaya orange wetsuits. This colour choice symbolises their historical affiliation with the Japan Coast Guard's Special Rescue Team, which served as the official mentor during the establishment of the STAR Rescue Divers. The use of papaya orange is a direct tribute to this foundational relationship.

==== Red wetsuit ====
As of 2025, MCG Rescue Swimmers don red wetsuits. The red colour is the official colour for coast guards personnel that assigned in maritime search and rescue (SAR) (Malay: Mencari dan Menyelamat; CARILAMAT) roles where their official working dress uniforms also in red colour. As one of units assigned in SAR roles, MCG Rescue Swimmers use red wetsuits.

== Selection and training ==
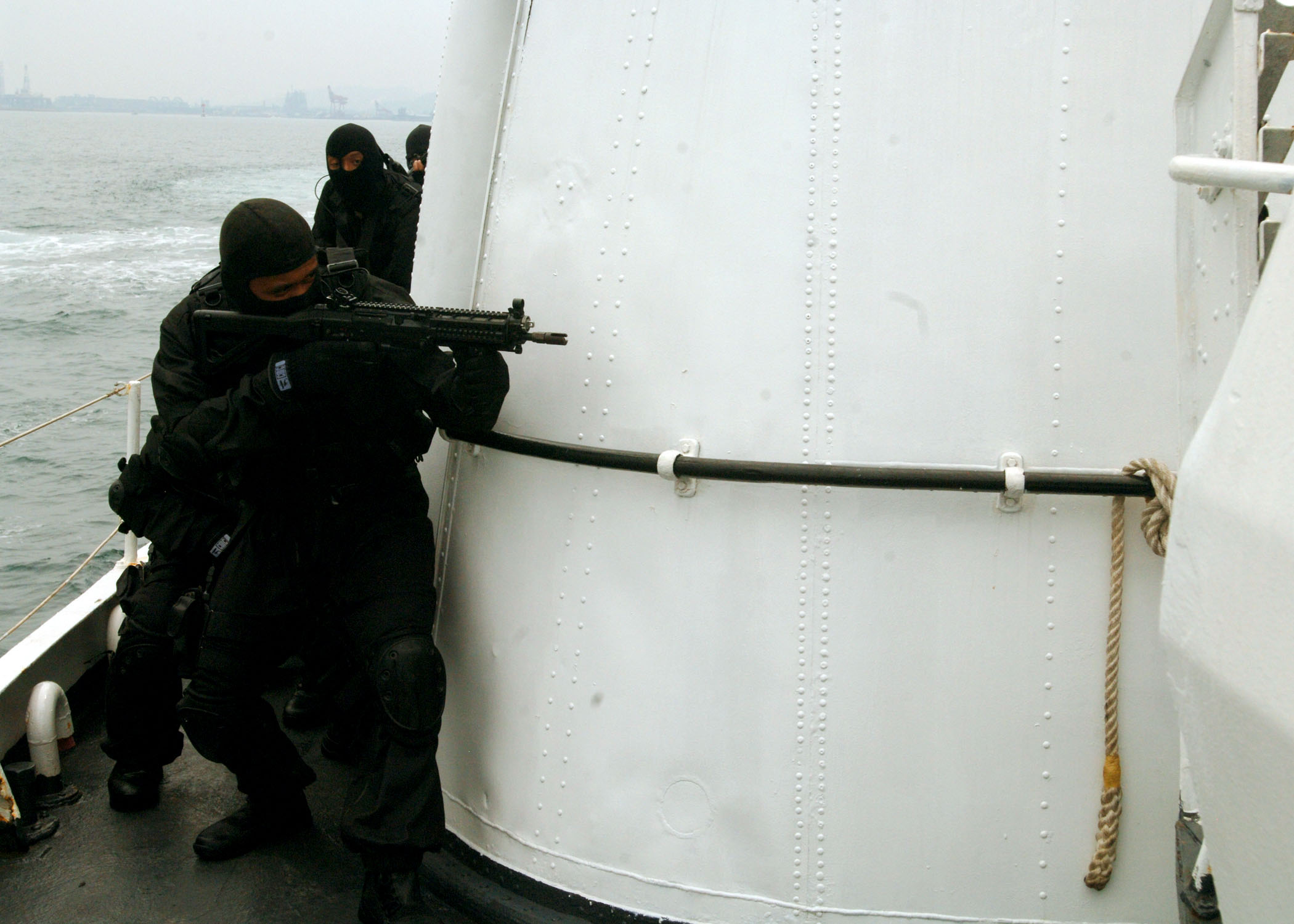
STAR commandos conducts a tactical boarding training exercise aboard a Malaysian offshore patrol vessel during a during 2011 Cooperation Afloat Readiness and Training (CARAT).

The Special Tasks and Rescue (STAR) command comprises specialised units, each requiring a unique selection and training process tailored to its specific maritime mission. Currently, three distinct training pipelines are available to Malaysia Coast Guard (MCG) personnel seeking to join the STAR command:

- MCG STAR Team Pipeline: Designed for candidates aspiring to become maritime special operations commandos. This track focuses on high-intensity combat, counter-terrorism, and unconventional warfare.
- MCG Rescue Diver Pipeline: Dedicated to personnel aiming to qualify as specialised divers. This pipeline emphasises underwater search and recovery, hull inspections, and technical diving skills.
- MCG Rescue Swimmer Pipeline: Tailored for candidates seeking qualification as heliborne rescue swimmers. This programme emphasises emergency medical response and life-saving techniques within open-water environments. To qualify for this track, candidates must first successfully complete the MCG Rescue Diver Pipeline before undergoing additional advanced training.

The selection and training programmes for these units are outlined as follows:

=== Malaysia Coast Guard STAR Team pipeline ===
Historically, the selection process for the Special Tasks and Rescue (STAR) Team was closely integrated with the Malaysian Armed Forces (MAF). Prior to August 2025, candidates were required to navigate five stages of the MAF Special Forces selection and complete a mandatory advanced training session before being conferred the STAR scarlet red beret and the STAR Special Operations Insignia.

In August 2025, the Malaysia Coast Guard (MMEA) transitioned to an independent special forces selection process. The current stages are outlined below:

==== Screening test (1 week) ====
This initial phase lasts for one week and is divided into two distinct components: the Selection and Pre-Assessment Course (Malay: Kursus Pemilihan dan Pra-Penilaian) and the Final Screening Test (Malay: Saringan Akhir).

In the inaugural 2025 series, the screening was conducted in January. Out of 50 volunteers, only 15 successfully passed the Final Screening Test. These candidates were then allotted a seven-month period for self-preparation before commencing the actual Basic Commando Course. Notably, the previously mandatory two-week Pre-Basic Commando Course is no longer a publicised requirement under the new independent format.

From 2008 until the 2025 reform, STAR candidates underwent a rigorous four-week internal preparatory programme known as Kursus Pra Asas Komando STAR (lit. 'STAR Pre-Basic Commando Course'). This was conducted by senior STAR instructors at various MCG bases and academies. Upon completion of the internal course, candidates were sent to a two-week Pre-Basic Commando Course at a Malaysian Armed Forces base. A notable example occurred in 2011, when instructors from the RMAF Special Forces and the STAR Team jointly supervised a month-long preparatory course at the RMAF Kuala Lumpur Airbase.

This Kursus Pra Asas Komando STAR was a critical filtering mechanism within the MAF Special Forces selection process, designed to identify and eliminate candidates lacking the physical or mental resilience required for elite training. The programme adhered to the stringent standards of the 21st Special Service Group (RGK), PASKAL, and PASKAU.

In the previous orientation course, candidates were required to pass three tests:

- Test 1: Physical Test (Water)
- Test 2: Physical Test (Land)
- Final Test: Fitness Test

==== Pre-Basic Commando Course (2 weeks) ====
In the updated Malaysia Coast Guard (MCG) STAR Team selection pipeline, it has not been officially publicised whether candidates are still required to undergo a separate two-week Pre-Basic Commando Course. However, historically, this phase was a critical component of the training progression.

The primary objective of this two-week course is to expose and prepare candidates before they embark on the Basic Commando Course conducted across the three branches of the MAF. This training programme unfolds in Teluk Batik, Lumut, Perak, under the supervision of instructors from PASKAL and STAR.

Throughout this course, trainees will be equipped with the skills necessary to build mental and physical strength, fostering a sense of esprit de corps in anticipation of the forthcoming Basic Commando Course. The curriculum includes instruction on basic small arms operation, map reading, compass and protractor navigation, basic unarmed combat, swimming, long-distance running, navigation techniques, survival strategies, and fundamental marksman training. Additionally, the training covers essential areas such as first aid, resistance to interrogation, and amphibious assault tactics.

==== Basic Commando Course – STAR Team (16 weeks) ====
In the updated MCG special forces selection pipeline, candidates are required to complete the 16-week Basic Commando Course – STAR Team. This revised curriculum is a strategic integration of the 12-week MAF Basic Commando Course, a four-week Water Competency programme, and the six-week Special Task Introduction Course (which was previously a separate, post-graduation requirement).

The syllabus has been streamlined to better align with the STAR Team’s specific maritime operational roles. The course is currently conducted at the Sultan Ahmad Shah Maritime Academy (AMSAS) in Kuantan, Pahang, pending the completion of a dedicated special forces training centre at the Kemaman Maritime Zone Naval Base.

Under the new format, the training is structured into three distinct phases:

- Phase 1: Physical and Mental Fortitude: Focusing on endurance, mindset, and basic tactical skills.
- Phase 2: Survival, Evasion, Resistance, and Escape (SERE): Training across jungle, swamp, and maritime environments.
- Phase 3: Basic Specialisation: Introducing core mission profiles such as VBSS and combat rescue.

Upon successful completion of the programme, graduates are officially conferred the Beret Merah Saga Gerak Khas (lit. 'Special Forces Scarlet Red Beret').

Previously, STAR Team candidates were seconded to the MAF for a 12-week Basic Commando Course. At the conclusion of the previous MAF-led training, graduates were awarded the beret corresponding to the school they attended. At this stage, the personnel were only considered unofficial members of the STAR Team until they completed further agency-specific training.

==== Special Task Introduction Course ====
Under the revised training pipeline introduced in 2025, the Special Task Introduction Course (Malay: Kursus Pengenalan Tindakan Khas) is no longer a standalone requirement. Instead, its curriculum has been integrated into the final phases of the comprehensive 16-week Basic Commando Course – STAR Team.

Prior to the 2025 reforms, each trainee was required to undergo this six-week internal programme immediately after completing the 12-week MAF Basic Commando Course. While the MAF provided the foundational commando qualification, the Special Task Introduction Course was essential for bridging the gap between general special operations and the specific maritime mission profiles of the Malaysia Coast Guard. Throughout this course, trainees are immersed in various skills essential for special operations, including weapon handling, tower training, helicopter-borne exercises, land and water navigation, survival techniques, and other specialised operational skills.

Upon successful completion of this course, trainees are presented with the scarlet red beret and the STAR Special Operations Insignia. This conferment signifies their official induction into the elite unit and marks the formal transition of candidates into full-fledged members of the STAR Team.

==== Continuation training ====
The Malaysian Army and the Royal Malaysian Navy (RMN) training centre conduct advanced training for STAR Team commandos.

On 14 November 2009, 25 commandos from the STAR Team participated in joint training exercises alongside 11 commandos from the PASKAL's Alpha Team. The training focused on close quarters combat and ship boarding, and rescue operations aboard the KD Panglima Hitam, situated at the RMN Lumut Naval Base. These exercises served to assess the STAR Team commandos' capability to execute their duties and responsibilities effectively. The training also encompassed the utilisation of coast guard's assets such as KM Gagah vessels and two Kilat boat classes from the Lumut Maritime District HQ (MD3).

=== Malaysia Coast Guard Rescue Diver pipeline ===
Since the establishment of Rescue Divers in 2009, the Malaysia Coast Guard (MCG) has consistently sent its officers and sailors for training at the US Naval Dive and Salvage Training Center in Panama City, FL. Subsequently, recognising the geographical proximity, MCG began sending its rescue diver candidates to the Japan Coast Guard's training centre. In 2014, the curriculum, initially derived from the US Coast Guard Aviation Survival Technician, was enriched by incorporating elements from the Japan Coast Guard Special Rescue Team, including underwater rescue in confined spaces. The training programme continued to be conducted under the Japanese Coast Guard.

In 2023, MCG took a significant step by organising its first rescue diver selection and training, with supervision provided by a representative from the Japan Coast Guard. The MCG Rescue Divers' pipeline spans approximately three months and is structured into three stages:

==== Initial Test and Medical Test ====
This stage is divided into two components: the Rescue Diver Qualification Test and the Compression Chamber Qualification Test.

===== Rescue Diver Qualification Test (2 weeks) =====
The Special Tasks and Rescue Team administers the test, commonly known as the Ujian Kelayakan Penyelam Penyelamat in Malay, over approximately two weeks. The evaluation utilises the physical training standards employed by Special Forces in Malaysia. This rigorous test is carried out at both garrisons of the Special Tasks and Rescue Assault Squadrons.

===== Compression Chamber Qualification Test (1 week) =====
Known as the Ujian Kelayakan Kebuk Mampatan in Malay, this test spans approximately one week and includes both physical training and medical evaluations. Depending on where candidates commence their Rescue Divers Qualification Test, they are transported to the Royal Malaysian Navy's medical facilities, located either at RMN Lumut Naval Base or RMN Kota Kinabalu Naval Base. At these facilities, candidates undergo thorough assessments of their physical abilities to determine their suitability for work as divers. The test adheres to the standards set by the Royal Malaysian Navy Mine Warfare and Diving Centre (KD Duyong).

==== Adaptation training (1 week) ====
This stage serves as a warm-up phase for the forthcoming Search and Rescue Diver Course.

==== Search and Rescue Diver Course ====
The Malaysia Coast Guard Rescue Divers, operating as part of the special operations command within the Malaysia Coast Guard, undergoes rigorous training commensurate with their elite status. This course, also known as Kursus Penyelam Penyelamat Maritim Malaysia (lit. 'Malaysia Coast Guard Rescue Diver Course'), extends over approximately two months. Combining elements from the curriculum of the US Coast Guard Aviation Survival Technician and the Japan Coast Guard Special Rescue Team, this course is divided into four phases:

- Qualification phase (4 weeks)

Modelled after the Water Competency Training of the Special Forces Selection.

- Pool phase (2 weeks)

Candidates receive theoretical instruction on rescue divers techniques, search and rescue procedures, surface water rescue, underwater rescue, rescue in confined spaces, and more.

- Practical phase: Port (1 week)

Candidates are sent to MCG Kemaman Maritime Zone HQ in Kemaman, Terengganu, where they undergo practical training at a naval port.

- Practical phase: Sea (1 week)

Candidates are subsequently deployed onboard a Coast Guard ship to the area around Tioman Island, where they engage in practical training at sea.

Throughout the Search and Rescue Diver Course, candidates are required to pass tests evaluating their diving abilities, underwater confined space rescue skills, and SCUBA deep diving capabilities.

==== Graduation day ====
Graduates of the Search and Rescue Diver Course are sent to the MCG Diving School, situated in the Sultan Ahmad Shah Coast Guard Academy in Kuantan, Pahang. At this facility, they showcase their acquired skills and demonstrate rescue diver capabilities, including activities such as jumping from high platforms and executing sea rescues of downed pilots.

==== Advanced Training: Rescue Swimmers ====
Upon completion of the Search and Rescue Diver Course, qualified rescue divers have the opportunity to advance their skills through specialised training as rescue swimmers. This advanced stage involves exposure to aviation (helicopter) operations, where individuals are trained to become integral members of helicopter crews. The training encompasses roles such as paramedics and helicopter-borne rescue divers.

After successfully passing all aspects of the training, these divers are awarded the MCG Rescue Swimmer Insignia. Subsequently, they are stationed at any airbase operated by the Malaysian Coast Guard.

== Equipment ==
Name	Type	Origin	Notes
SIG model GL 5040	Grenade launcher	(Switzerland)	
Glock 19	Semi-automatic pistol	(Austria)	
Heckler & Koch SFP9	Semi-automatic pistol	(Germany)	
Remington 870	Shotgun	(United States)	
Heckler & Koch model UMP 9	Submachine gun	(Germany)	
Scorpion model Evo 3	Submachine gun	(Czech Republic)	
Colt model CM901	Assault rifle	(United States)	
Adcor A-556	Assault rifle	(United States)	
SIG model SG 553 SB	Assault rifle	(Switzerland)	
Accuracy International Arctic Warfare	Sniper rifle	(United Kingdom)	
Denel model SS-77	Machine gun	(South Africa)	
Blaser model R93	Sniper rifle	(Germany)	

== Operations ==
=== MT Tanker MGT1 hijacking ===
On 7 September 2017, the STAR team from the Malaysia Coast Guard (MCG) thwarted a plan by 13 Indonesian pirates to rob and hijack a Thailand-registered oil tanker near Tenggol Island. The vessel in question, MT Tanker MGT1, carried 14 crew members, all of whom were Siamese. The ship was transporting approximately 2.2 million litres of diesel, valued at around 7 million ringgit (approximately 1.66 million US dollars), when it disappeared from the Automatic Identification System on Wednesday afternoon. The vessel was en route from Thailand to deliver fuel to Johor.

Upon receiving a report from a local fisherman who had spotted pirates boarding the Tanker MGT1 about 3 nautical miles (5.6 km) from Yu Besar Island, the MCG deployed a STAR team for a rescue mission. Although the team departed for the tanker's last known location via helicopter, they discovered the tanker was missing upon arrival. However, a subsequent operation led to the arrest of 10 pirates off the coast of Terengganu.

Following the pirates' arrest and subsequent interrogation, Malaysian authorities apprehended the mastermind, an Indonesian man in his 50s, at a hotel in Johor Bahru at noon.

=== MT Lee Bo robbery ===
On 1 June 2018, a STAR team arrested 14 pirates aboard the MT Bright, located 25 nautical miles (46 km) off the coast of Mersing within Malaysian waters, during a pre-dawn raid. Prior to this arrest, the command centre had reported that these pirates were in the process of robbing the Mongolian-registered merchant vessel, MT Lee Bo, and confiscating all personal items from the crew. However, they were unsuccessful in stealing any cargo since the ship was empty.

Subsequently, the KM Sebatik was assigned to tail the Lee Bo and gather additional information on the pirates. Upon approaching the Lee Bo, the Sebatik crew discovered 12 ship crew members on board, along with crucial information that the pirates were armed with machetes. This information, along with their last known location, was relayed to the command centre. In response, a team of seven STAR commandos was swiftly mobilised using AW139 helicopters to pursue the pirates.

Identifying the pirates' vessel as the MT Bright, the STAR team descended from their helicopter and successfully arrested all 14 individuals on board. During the interrogation that followed, the pirates divulged information about their mastermind. Acting on this intelligence, the Malaysia Coast Guard's strategic partner, the Indonesian Western Fleet Quick Response - Angkatan Laut (WFQR-AL), was alerted. As a result, two masterminds were apprehended in Batam, Indonesia.

== In popular culture ==
Film & television

- 2017: "Ops Maritim" is a reality TV series highlighting the daily activities of the Malaysia Coast Guard, Marine Operations Force and the STAR Team's operations, broadcast on TV3. This show is a spin-off from the Malaysian TV series "999", which draws inspiration from the American documentary-style legal show "COPS".
- 2019: "TQ Captain" is a romantic TV series adapted from the 2018 Malay novel "TQ Kapten!" by Qash Irdina. It features Hisyam Hamid, Mawar Rashid, and Mark Adam. It aired on Astro Ria from 9 December 2019 to 9 January 2020. The show follows Mikayla Mirza (played by Mawar Rashid), a TV journalist assigned to film a documentary about the Malaysia Coast Guard, including STAR's operations.
- 2023: "Coast Guard Malaysia: Ops Helang" (lit. 'Operation Eagle') is a 2023 action movie featuring Saharul Ridzwan. He plays the main character, an officer from the STAR Team.

Featured on:

- 999 (Malaysian TV series)
- Malaysia Hari Ini

== See also ==
- Elite Forces of Malaysia
  - Malaysian Army 21st Special Service Group
  - Malaysian Army 10th Parachute Brigade
  - Royal Malaysian Navy PASKAL
  - Royal Malaysian Air Force PASKAU
  - Royal Malaysia Police Pasukan Gerakan Khas
