= Japanese ship Yashima =

Two naval vessels of Japan have been named Yashima:

- Japanese battleship Yashima, she was commissioned in 1897 of Fuji-class battleship of Imperial Japanese Navy and sank by a mine in 1904.
- Japanese patrol boat Yashima, she was commissioned in 1988 of Mizuho-class patrol vessel of Japan Coast Guard.
