= Russian frigate Vorovskiy =

Krivak-class frigate

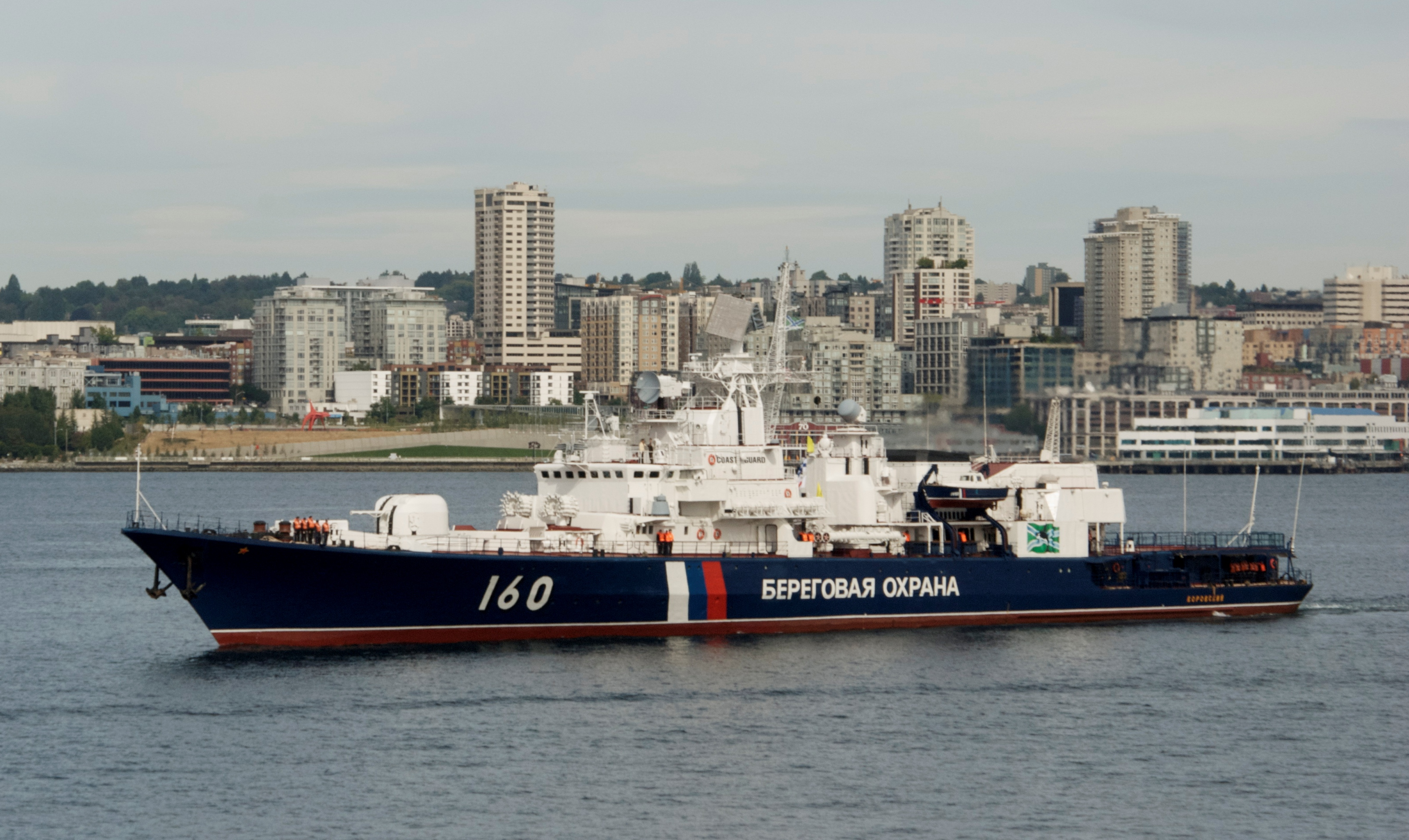
- Vorovskiy in Seattle on 26 August 2009

History

→ Soviet Union → Russia
- Name: Vorovskiy
- Namesake: Vatslav Vorovsky
- Builder: Zaliv Shipyard, Kerch
- Yard number: 207
- Laid down: 15 May 1987
- Launched: 28 July 1990
- Commissioned: 29 December 1990
- Decommissioned: 19 September 2017
- Status: Retired

General characteristics
- Class & type: Project 11351 Nerey frigate
- Displacement: 3,180 t (3,130 long tons) (standard); 3,670 t (3,610 long tons) (full)
- Length: 123 m (403 ft 7 in)
- Beam: 14.2 m (46 ft 7 in)
- Draught: 5 m (16 ft 5 in)
- Installed power: 63,000 shp (47,000 kW)
- Propulsion: 4 gas turbines; COGAG; 2 shafts
- Speed: 32 kn (59 km/h)
- Range: 3,900 nmi (7,223 km) at 14 kn (26 km/h)
- Complement: 192
- Sensors & processing systems: MR-760 Fregat-MA air/surface search radar; Vaigach-Nayada navigational radar; MR-184 Lev fire control radar; Vympel-A fire control radar; MGK-335S Platina-S sonar; MG-345 Bronza towed sonar
- Electronic warfare & decoys: MP-401 Start ESM; PK-16 and PK-10 chaff launchers
- Armament: 2 × ZIF-122 4K33 launchers (1×2) with 20 4K33 OSA-M (SA-N-4'Gecko') SAMs (1×2); 1 × 100 mm (4 in) AK-100 gun; 2 × 30 mm (1 in) AK-630M CIWS; 2 × RBU-6000 Smerch-2 anti-submarine rockets; 8 × 533 mm (21 in) torpedo tubes (2×4); 16 × naval mines
- Aircraft carried: 1 × Kamov Ka-27PS
- Aviation facilities: Helipad and hangar

Vorovskiy (also transliterated Vorovsky, Russian: Воровский) was a Project 11351 Nerey-class frigate (NATO reporting name Krivak III) of the Soviet Border Troops and later the Coast Guard of the Federal Security Service of Russia.

== Design and description ==
Vorovskiy was one of nine Project 11351 ships launched between 1982 and 1992. Project 11351, the Nerey (Russian: Нерей, "Nereus") class, was the patrol version of the Project 1135 Burevestnik for the Soviet Maritime Border Troops. The ships were designated Border Patrol Ship (пограничный сторожевой корабль, PSKR) to reflect their role as patrol ships of the Border Troops. In comparison to other members of the class, Project 11351 ships has a helipad and hangar for a Kamov Ka-27PS search-and-rescue helicopter astern, in exchange to losing one 100 mm gun, one twin-arm surface-to-air missile launcher and the URPK-5 Rastrub (SS-N-14 'Silex') anti-ship missile launchers. NATO classified the vessels as 'Krivak III'-class frigates.

Vorovskiy was 123 m (403 ft 7 in) long overall, with a beam of 14.2 m (46 ft 7 in) and a draught of 5 m (16 ft 5 in). Displacing 3,180 t (3,130 long tons) standard and 3,670 t (3,610 long tons) full load, the ship's power were provided by two 22,500 shp (16,800 kW) DT59 and two 9,000 shp (6,700 kW) DS71 gas turbines arranged in a COGAG installation, driving two fixed-pitch propellers. Design speed was 32 knots (59 km/h; 37 mph) and range 3,900 nautical miles (7,223 km; 4,488 mi) at 14 kn (26 km/h; 16 mph). The ship's complement was 192, including 31 officers.

=== Armament and sensors ===
Vorovskiy was armed with one 100 mm (4 in) AK-100 gun mounted forward of the bridge and two AK-630M close-in weapon system autocannons mounted on each side of the helicopter hangar. Defence against aircraft was provided by twenty 4K33 OSA-M (SA-N-4 'Gecko') surface-to-air missiles which were launched from one set of twin-arm ZIF-122 launchers, mounted aft of the fore 100 mm gun. For anti-submarine warfare, the ship were equipped with a pair of RBU-6000 213 mm (8 in) Smerch-2 12-barrel anti-submarine rocket launchers and a pair of PTA-53-1135 quadruple launchers for 533 mm (21 in) torpedoes, consisted of either 53-65K wake homing torpedo or SET-65 anti-submarine homing torpedo. The ship can also carry 16 naval mines.

The ship sensor suites includes Sapfir-U7 combat management system, a single MR-760 Fregat-MA air/surface search radar, one Vaigach-Nayada navigation radar, and the MP-401 Start Electronic Support Measures (ESM) system. Fire control for the guns consisted of MR-184 Lev radar for the 100 mm gun and Vympel-A radar for the 30 mm autocannons. An extensive sonar complex was fitted, including the bow-mounted MGK-335S Platina-S and the towed-array MG-345 Bronza. The vessel was also equipped with two PK-16 and two PK-10 decoy-dispenser system which used chaff as a form of missile defense.

== Construction and career ==
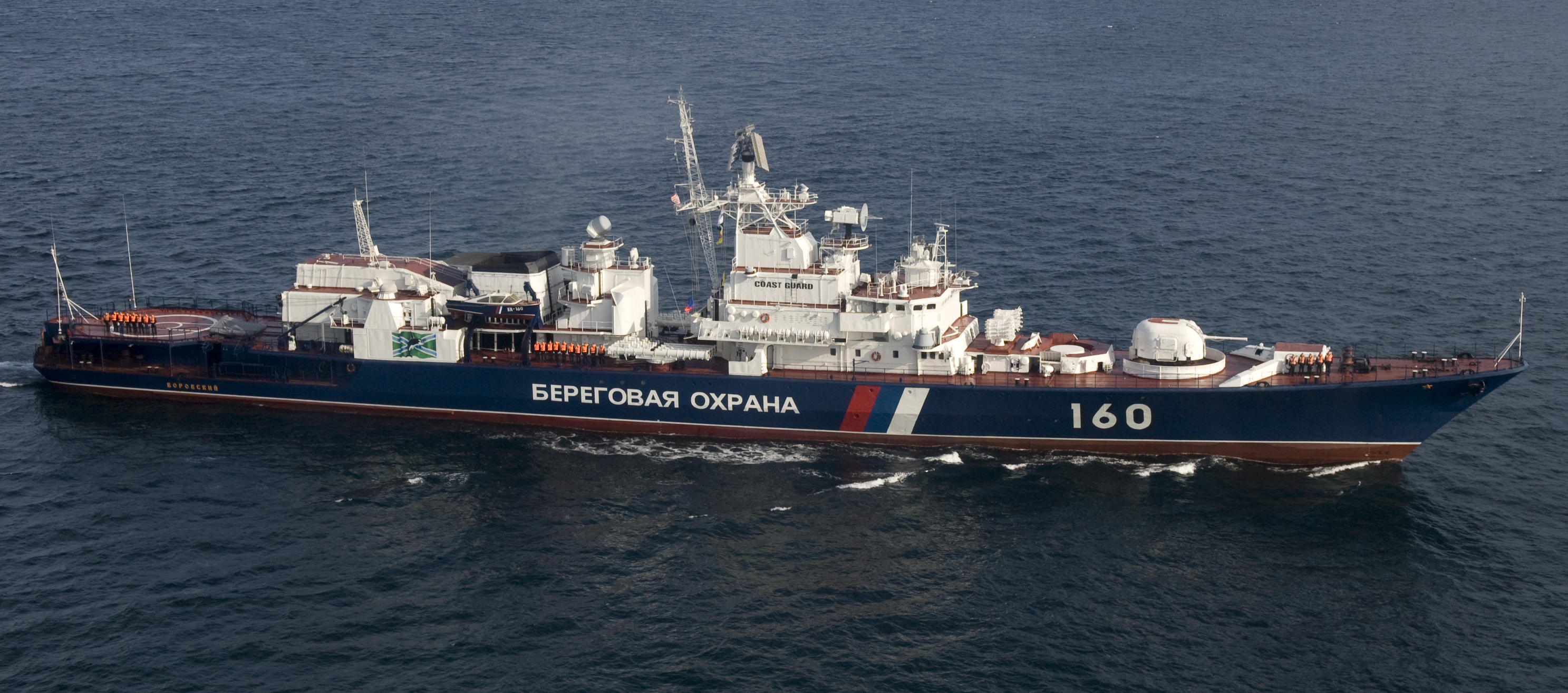
Vorovskiy on 23 August 2009

The frigate was the seventh ship of the class. The keel was laid on 15 May 1987 with yard number 207 at the Zaliv Shipyard in Kerch. The ship was launched on 28 July 1990. Vorovskiy was commissioned to KGB Border Troops Naval Service on 29 December 1990. The border guard ensign was hoisted on the ship for the first time on 5 April 1991. She made a shakedown cruise around the Black Sea on 20–26 June 1991, visiting ports of Novorossiysk, Batumi, and Odesa.

The ship was assigned to the 2nd Brigade of Border Patrol Ships, 1st Red Banner Division of Border Patrol Ships in Petropavlovsk-Kamchatsky, part of the Northeastern Border District. From 18 August to 9 October 1991, Vorovskiy sailed from Sevastopol to its assigned homeport in Petropavlovsk-Kamchatsky via Suez Canal.

The frigate was laid up from 1994 to 2000 due to lack of funding. She returned to active service in 2001.

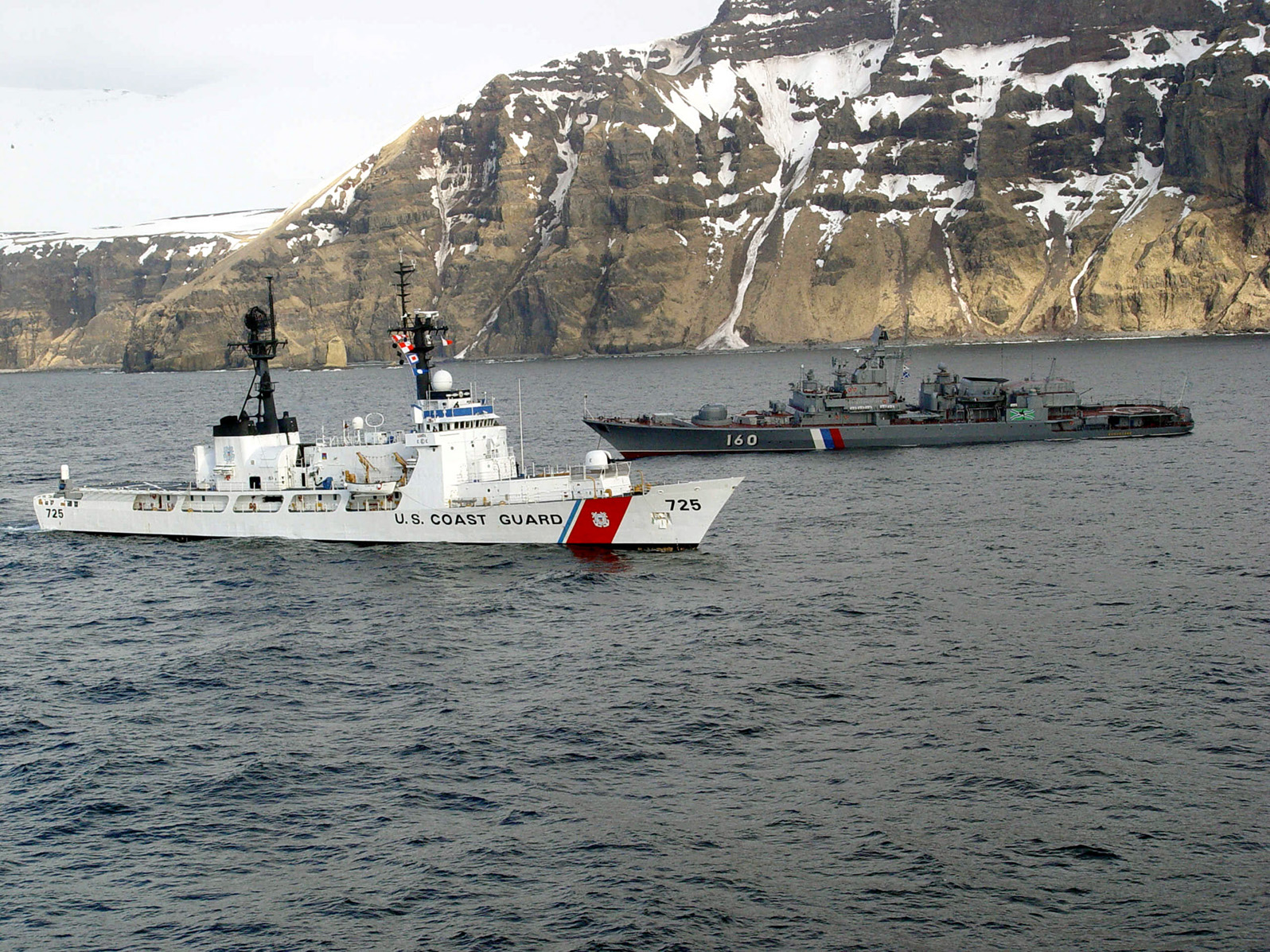
Vorovskiy rendezvous with USCGC Jarvis near Kodiak, Alaska on 10 April 2004 during an Alaskan patrol

Vorovskiy stopped and boarded the Russian freezer trawler Rekin, based from Magadan, for inspection on 23 May 2002 in the waters off northern Kuril Islands. The boarding party that was sent consisted of a border guard officer and five employees from the State Marine Inspectorate of Petropavlovsk-Kamchatsky, which went to the wheelhouse for a conversation with the trawler's captain about the inspection of documents. A few minutes later, the trawler's crew weighed anchor and heading outside Russian exclusive economic zone at high speed and towards Japanese waters, all the while the inspection party is still on board. Rekin's captain reasoned that they urgently needs to meet with an other Magadan-based trawler Solnechny to supposedly replenish freon supply, while at the same time ignored orders to stop by the border guard officer aboard. Vorovskiy then chased the trawler for suspicion of illegal fishing.

The incident was immediately reported up to the chain of command of the Pacific Border District, with another border patrol ship sent to pursuit and an An-72 was flown to track the trawler. The Japanese authorities also has been notified and ready to cooperate. Rekin kept ignoring warning shots fired by the frigate, instead sending SOS signals declaring that they were pursued by an unknown warship. Vorovskiy then successfully stopped the trawler around 230–250 nautical miles southeast of Simushir Island. Rekin was then escorted to Kamchatka, with the inspection party recovered uninjured.

Vorovskiy and USCGC Jarvis participated in joint exercise on navigation and radio communications in Alaskan waters in April 2004. In summer of that year, Vorovskiy along with USCGC Munro and C-130 Hercules of the United States Coast Guard 17th District took part in a joint exercise. The frigate departed Petropavlovsk-Kamchatsky on 31 August 2004 for Kodiak, Alaska to participate in a Russo-American coast guards joint exercise held in the Gulf of Alaska, which ended on 12 September. The joint exercise consisted of training maneuvers for communication and maneuvering, rendering assistance to a ship in distress, and smuggling prevention.

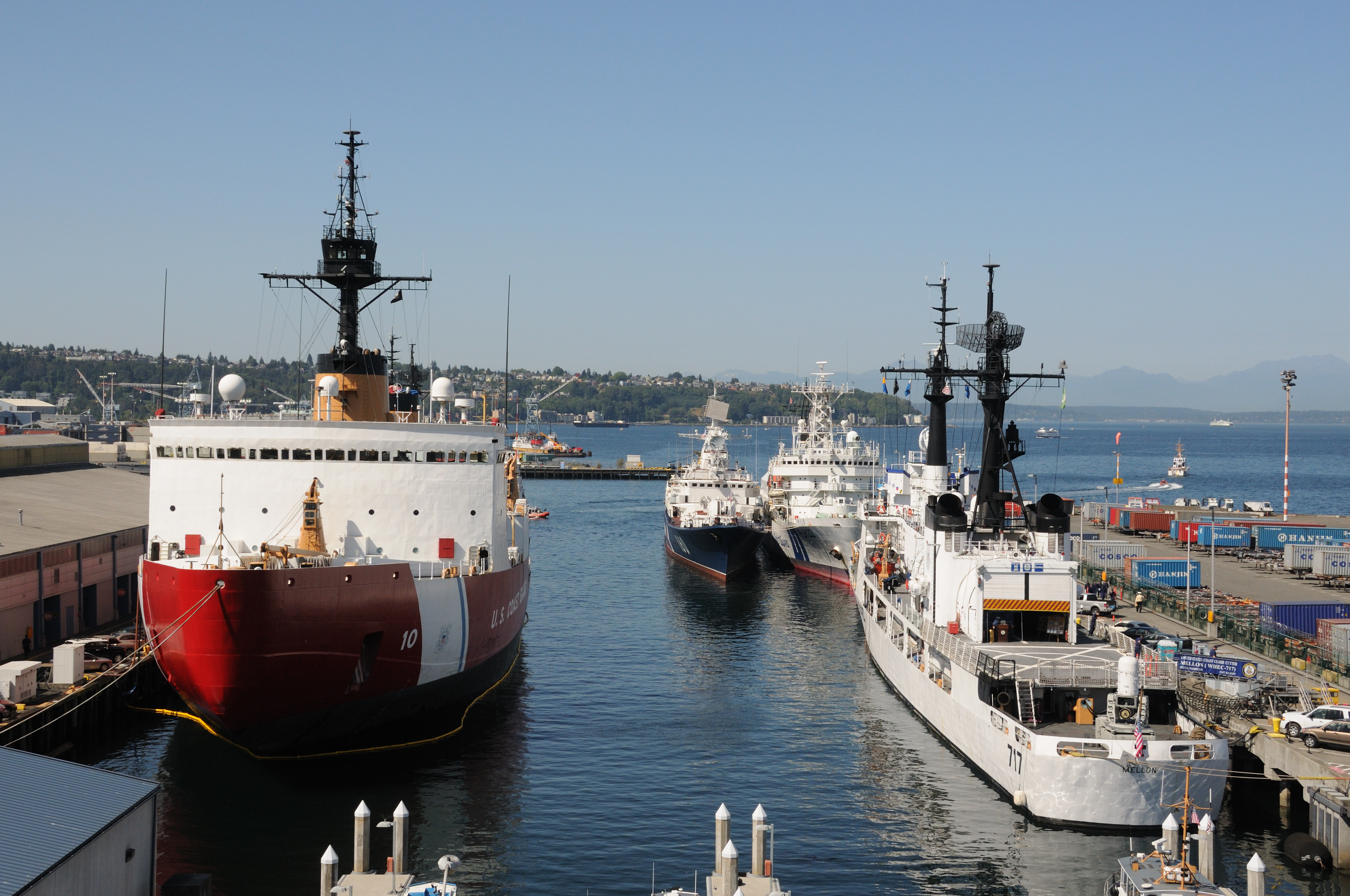
USCGC Polar Star and Mellon (foreground), with Vorovskiy and Yashima (background) in Seattle during the 10th NPCGF, 27 August 2009

The ship concluded an Agreement on Friendship and Cooperation with Novosibirsk municipal government in 2006. The patronage agreement includes military-patriotic education, delegations exchange, and facilitating the recruitment of Novosibirsk citizens for contract service on the ship.

In April 2007, Vorovskiy visited the U.S. Coast Guard 17th District in Kodiak, Alaska. Along the way, the frigate along with USCGC Chase conducted joint maneuvers at sea in the Alaskan waters.

Vorovskiy participated in Exercise Pacific Unity 2009, part of the 10th North Pacific Coast Guard Agencies Forum, held on 24–27 August 2009. She arrived at Port Angeles on 23 August. The exercise includes simulated search and rescue, navigation and security operations.

The ship made a port call to Magadan on 12 June 2017.

Vorovskiy was decommissioned on 19 September 2017 with a flag lowering ceremony held aboard the ship, which was moored at coast guard base in Petropavlovsk-Kamchatsky. In September 2020, a brown bear swam around and tried to enter Vorovskiy, until a number of people started to gather on the shore and then the bear left.
