= Japanese patrol vessel Yashima =

Mizuho-class patrol vessel

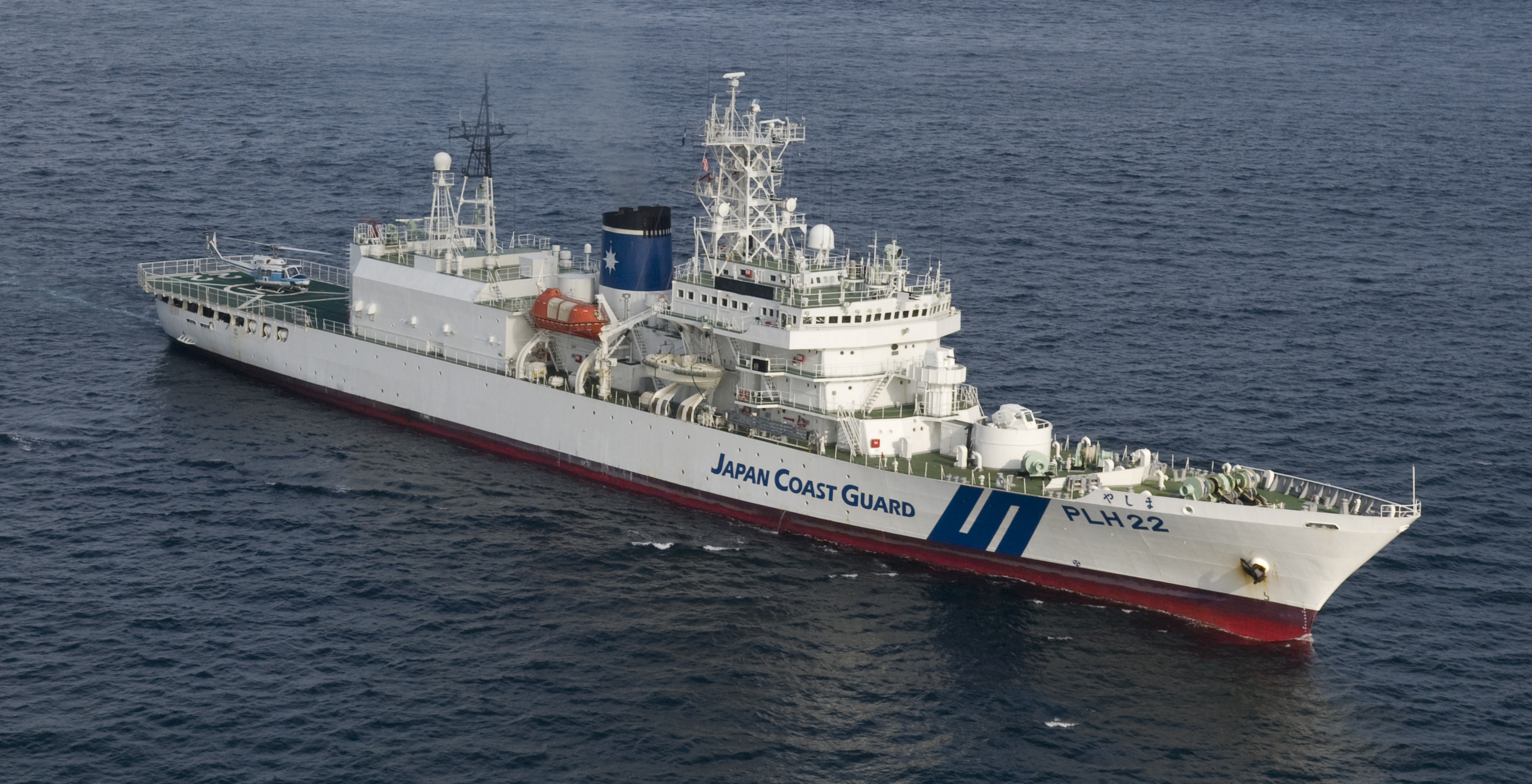
- Yashima on 23 August 2009

History

Japan
- Name: Yashima; (やしま)
- Namesake: Yashima
- Ordered: March 1983
- Builder: JFE Holdings, Yokohama
- Laid down: 3 August 1987
- Launched: 20 January 1988
- Commissioned: 1 December 1988
- Home port: Fukuoka
- Identification: IMO number: 8618724; MMSI number: 431297000; Callsign: JPDX; Pennant number: PLH-22
- Status: Active

General characteristics
- Class & type: Mizuho-class patrol vessel
- Tonnage: 5,259 GT
- Displacement: 5,317 tonnes normal load
- Length: 130.0 m (426 ft 6 in)
- Beam: 15.5 m (50 ft 10 in)
- Draught: 8.8 m (28 ft 10 in)
- Propulsion: 2 × shafts; 2 × diesel engines
- Speed: 23 knots (43 km/h; 26 mph)
- Range: 8,500 nmi (15,700 km; 9,800 mi)
- Complement: 130
- Armament: 1 × L/90 35 mm gun; 1 × JM61 20 mm gun
- Aviation facilities: 2 × ASR helicopter

Yashima (PLH-22) is the second ship of Mizuho-class patrol vessel of Japanese Coast Guard.

== Development and design ==
In 1979, the International Maritime Organization (IMO) adopted the International Convention on Maritime Search and Rescue (SAR). In response to this Convention, Japan and the United States shared the search and rescue activities on the Pacific Ocean by concluding "Agreement on search and rescue at sea between the Japanese government and the United States government" (Japan-US SAR agreement). The scope of responsibility for Japan was north of 17 degrees north and 165 degrees east longitude, which meant sending rescue units from the coast of Japan to a distance of 1,200 nautical miles (2,200 km). At the end of 1980, certain large scale marine accidents occurred, and in March 1981 accidents of large tankers and cargo ships occurred in the Malacca Straits, and the development of wide area patrol system became an urgent task.

This class is built as higher-endurance cutters with a double helicopter hangar for this mission. Initially, it was also designed with the overseas non-combatant evacuation operations (NEO) in mind. However, since the JMSA is not a military but a civilian police organization and does not receive civilian control, the potential use of force in the evacuation operation was regarded as a problem, and it was redesigned with an emphasis on the search and rescue mission.

they have a double helicopter hangar. To move the helicopter between the hangar and the helicopter deck, a helicopter traverse device developed by the JMSA was installed. The shipboard helicopters were the Bell 212 air-sea rescue helicopters in the early days. Then, with the aging of the Bell 212, they were superseded by the Bell 412 by 2014. As shipboard weapons, one Oerlikon 35 mm L/90 gun and one JM61-M 20 mm rotary cannon were set up. And later, JM61-M was upgraded to JM61-RFS, remotely operated version with an optical director.

== Construction and career ==
Completed on 1 December 1988, she was assigned to the Yokohama Coast Guard (3rd Regional Coast Guard). After that, with the commissioning of Akitsushima, she was reassigned to Fukuoka (7th Regional Coast Guard) on 11 October 2013.

From 2 September to 11 November 1989, the year after its completion, the Japan Coast Guard patrol boat made its first round-the-world voyage. This is to participate in the 30th anniversary event of the International Maritime Organization (IMO) held in London, via the Panama Canal on the outbound route and the Suez Canal on the inbound route. In the United Kingdom, joint training with the Coast Guard and the Royal National Lifeboat Institution was conducted, which was televised worldwide by the British Broadcasting Corporation (BBC). After that, he went back up the Thames and moored it next to Belfast, but during the event, the security rescue boat and helicopter on board the ship participated in the joint parade between Japan and the UK on the Thames, and it was open to the public. Also visited by many citizens.

== Gallery ==
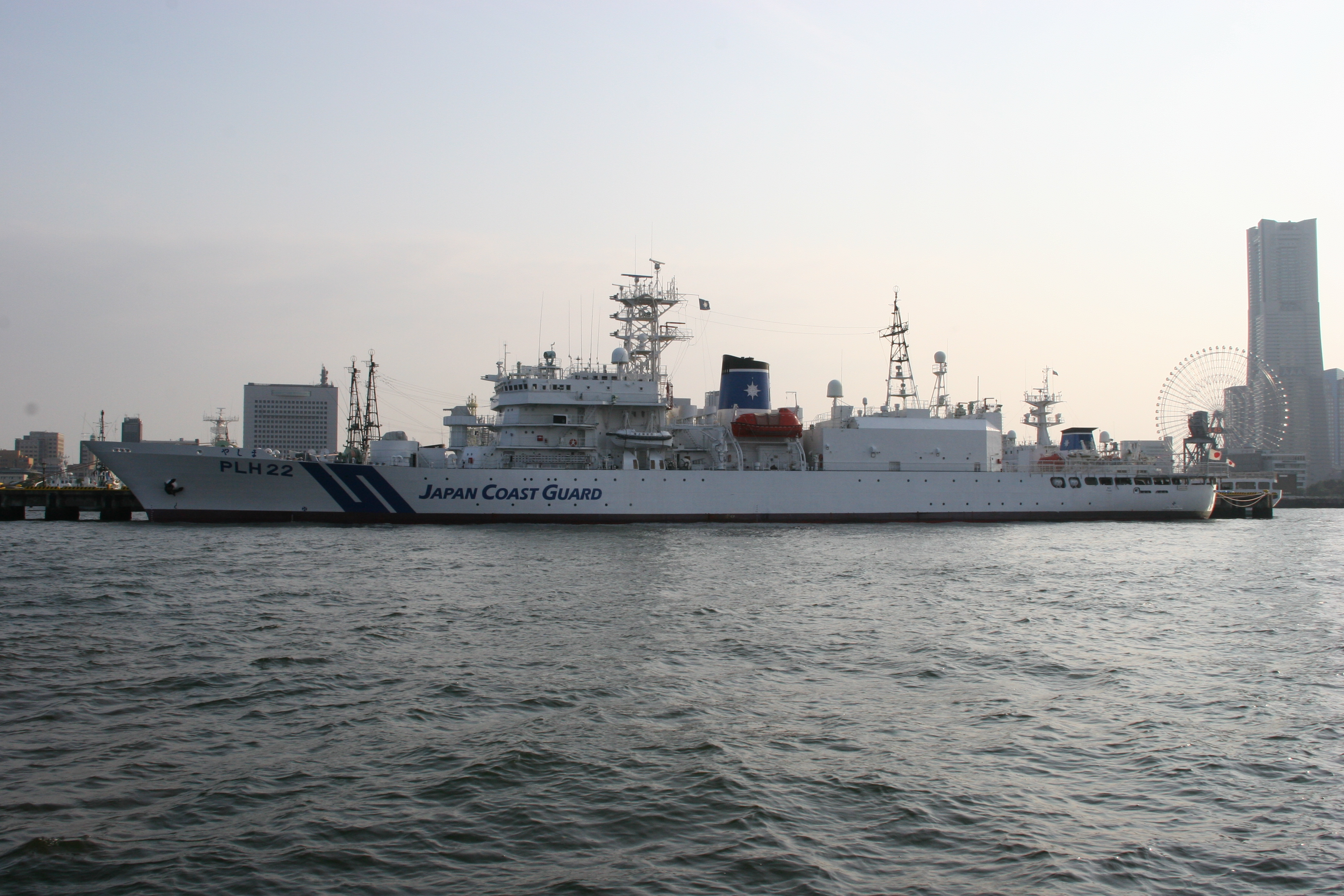
Yashima at Yokohama on 21 May 2006.

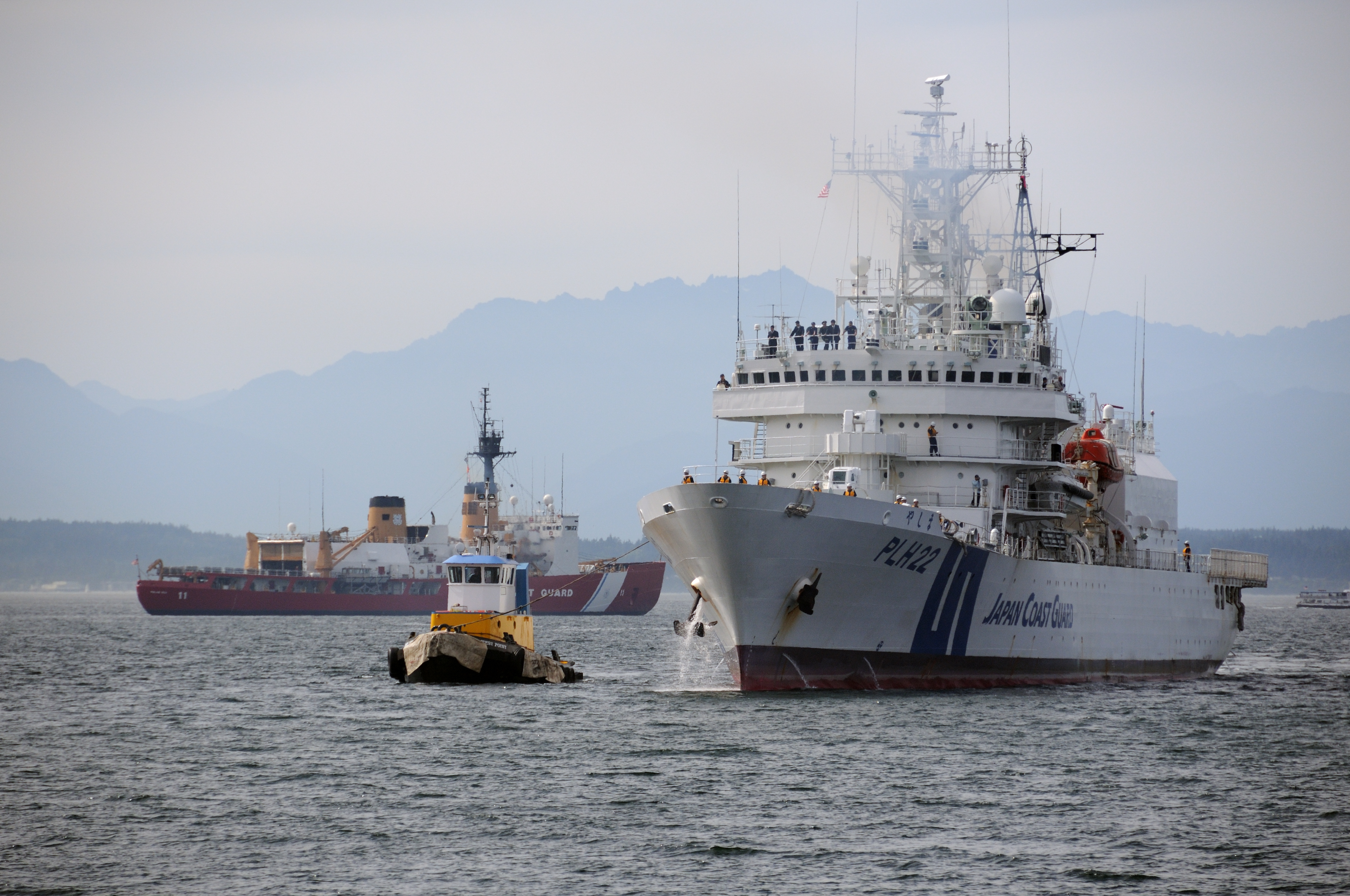
Yashima at Seattle on 26 August 2009.

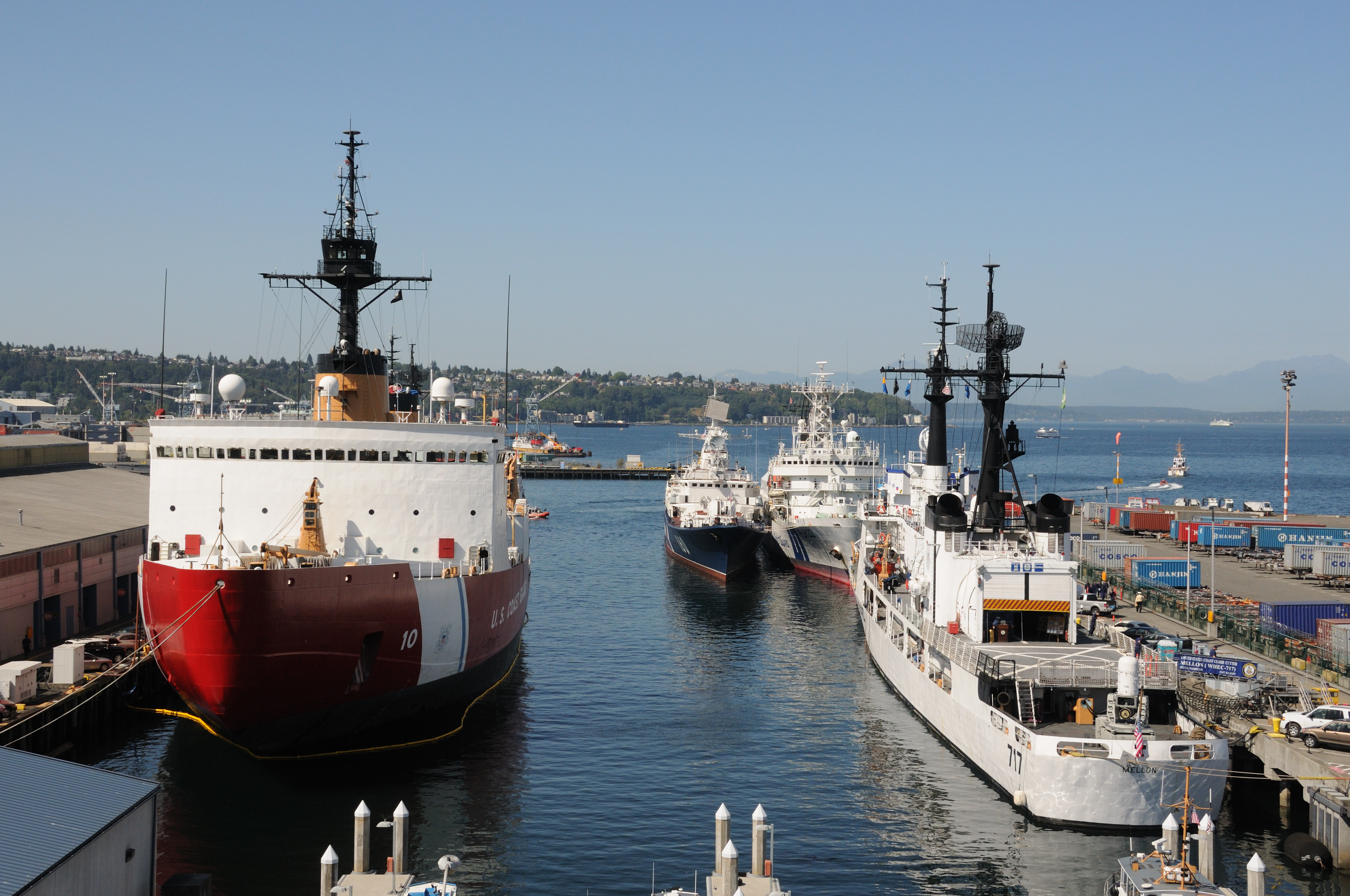
Yashima, USCGC Mellon, USCGC Polar Sea and Vorovskiy at Seattle on 26 August 2009.

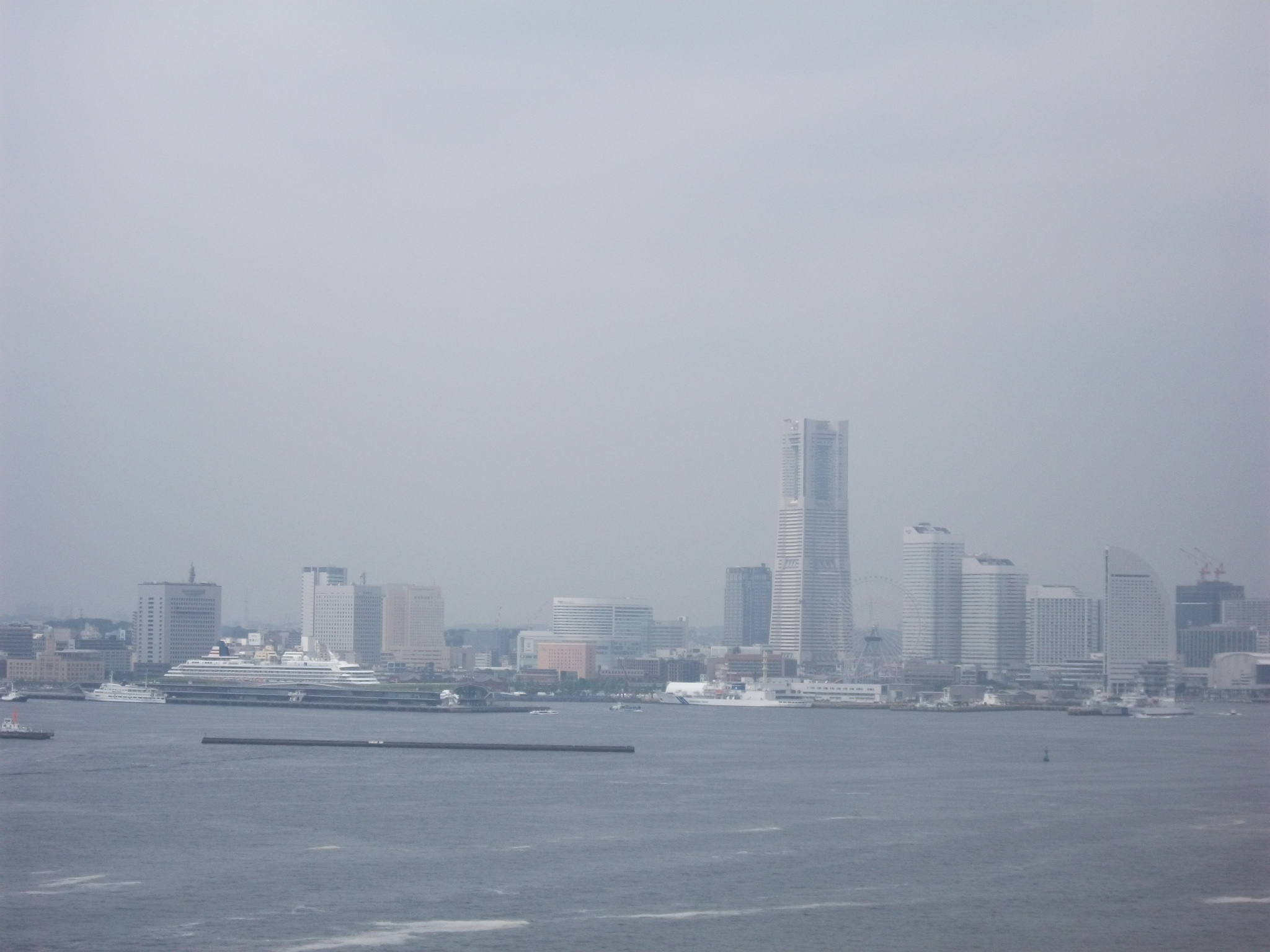
Yashima at Yokohama on 21 August 2010.
