= North Pacific Coast Guard Agencies Forum =

International maritime organization

North Pacific Coast Guard Forum
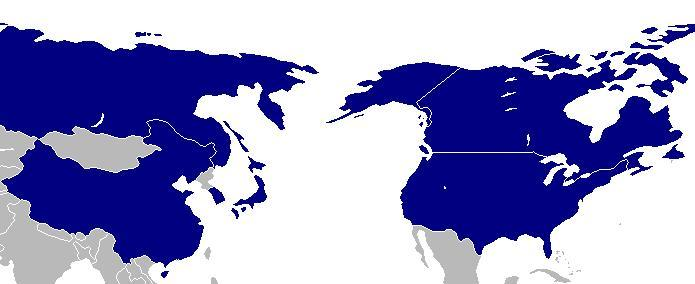
- Member Countries Shown in Blue
- Formation: 2000
- Type: Regional Cooperation Initiative
- Headquarters: Meetings Rotate Between Member States
- Members: 6 member states

The North Pacific Coast Guard Forum (NPCGF) was initiated by the Japan Coast Guard in 2000 as a venue to foster multilateral cooperation through the sharing of information on matters related to combined operations, exchange of information, illegal drug trafficking, maritime security, fisheries enforcement, illegal migration, and maritime domain awareness. The current membership includes agencies from Canada, China, Japan, South Korea, Russia, and the United States.

The first Forum was held in Tokyo in 2000 and has followed an alternating semi-annual cycle of technical experts and principals meetings since. Between 2000 and 2005, meetings were sponsored by Japan, Russia, United States, South Korea, Canada and Japan.

The forum has had success in documenting best practices from the member countries in areas of illegal drug trafficking, maritime security, fisheries enforcement and illegal migration, has a web-based information exchange system, and has published a manual for combined operations.

== Continued work ==
The cooperation fostered in the forum was successfully tested during a tabletop exercise in Victoria, British Columbia, Canada in March 2004 involving the tracking of a fictitious vessel suspected of carrying weapons of mass destruction as it transited the international waters off each member country’s coast. During the summer of 2005, the forum planned and executed actual at-sea combined operations were conducted to enforce Illegal, Unregulated, Unreported (IUU) Fisheries regulations in the North Pacific Ocean. Member nations noted the success of the 2005 combined operations and have continued them in recent years.

== Role model ==
The success of the NPHCGAF encouraged the United States to take the lead on establishing a similar forum for north Atlantic countries. In 2005 and 2006 the US Coast Guard worked with dozens of European countries and Canada to advance the idea and in August 2007 a plenary session will be held in Sweden to finalize the details of that organization.

== 8th North Pacific Coast Guard Forum Summit in St. Petersburg, Russia ==
The North Pacific Coast Guard Forum, which takes place in St. Petersburg, Russia, is an international organization whose members include representatives from civil maritime organizations in Canada, China, Japan, South Korea, Russia, and the United States. The purpose of such a forum is to develop multilateral cooperation through the exchange of information and expertise in the areas of joint maritime operations, illegal drug smuggling, maritime security, fisheries management, and illegal migration. The organizations use the forums to coordinate activities to improve maritime safety, environmental protection, and search and rescue operations in the North Pacific region.

“The NPCGF reached a milestone in 2005 when vessels from the U.S. Coast Guard, China, Russia and Japan conducted combined operations at sea. This year’s forum will build on that success and address a broad range of maritime issues. Drawing on the success of the NPCGF, civil maritime agencies for nations of the North Atlantic will meet in Sweden in October 2007 to inaugurate the North Atlantic Coast Guard Forum.”
