= Japanese patrol vessel Mizuho (PLH-21) =

Mizuho-class patrol vessel

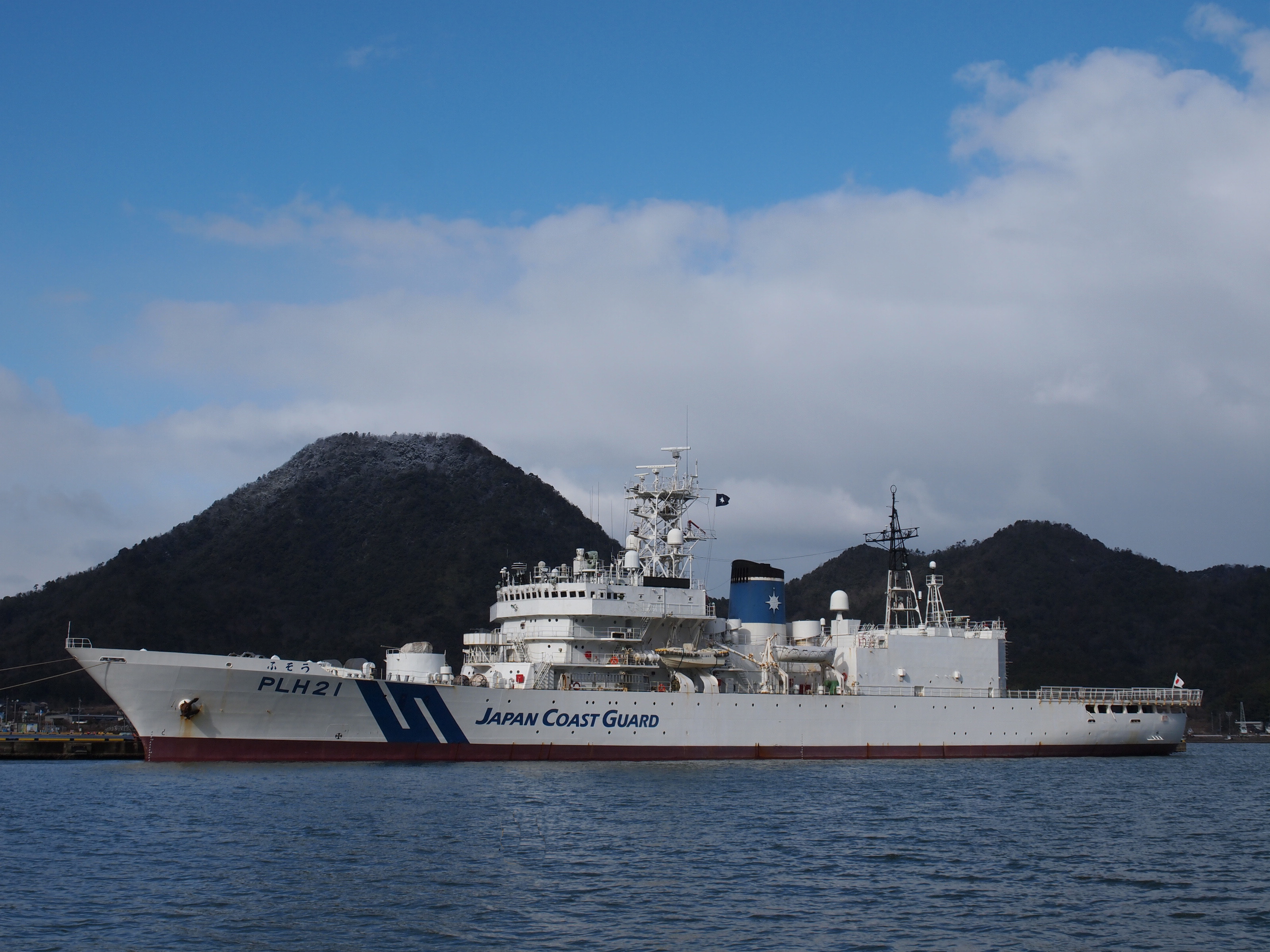
- Fusō on 9 February 2020

History

Japan
- Name: Mizuho; (みずほ)
- Namesake: Mizuho
- Ordered: March 1983
- Builder: Mitsubishi, Nagasaki
- Laid down: 27 August 1984
- Launched: 5 June 1985
- Commissioned: 19 March 1986
- Renamed: Fusō; (ふそう)
- Home port: Maizuru
- Identification: IMO number: 8602464; MMSI number: 431077000; Callsign: JEQE; Pennant number: PLH-21
- Status: Active

General characteristics
- Class & type: Mizuho-class patrol vessel
- Tonnage: 5,259 GT
- Displacement: 5,317 tonnes normal load
- Length: 130.0 m (426 ft 6 in)
- Beam: 15.5 m (50 ft 10 in)
- Draught: 8.8 m (28 ft 10 in)
- Propulsion: 2 × shafts; 2 × diesel engines
- Speed: 23 knots (43 km/h; 26 mph)
- Range: 8,500 nmi (15,700 km; 9,800 mi)
- Complement: 130
- Armament: 1 × L/90 35 mm gun; 1 × JM61 20 mm gun
- Aviation facilities: 2 × ASR helicopter

Mizuho (PLH-21) is the lead ship of Mizuho-class patrol vessel of Japanese Coast Guard. She was renamed as Fusō in 2019.

== Development and design ==
In 1979, the International Maritime Organization (IMO) adopted the International Convention on Maritime Search and Rescue (SAR). In response to this Convention, Japan and the United States shared the search and rescue activities on the Pacific Ocean by concluding "Agreement on search and rescue at sea between the Japanese government and the United States government" (Japan-US SAR agreement). The scope of responsibility for Japan was north of 17 degrees north and 165 degrees east longitude, which meant sending rescue units from the coast of Japan to a distance of 1,200 nautical miles (2,200 km). At the end of 1980, certain large scale marine accidents occurred, and in March 1981 accidents of large tankers and cargo ships occurred in the Malacca Straits, and the development of wide area patrol system became an urgent task.

This class is built as higher-endurance cutters with a double helicopter hangar for this mission. Initially, it was also designed with the overseas non-combatant evacuation operations (NEO) in mind. However, since the JMSA is not a military but a civilian police organization and does not receive civilian control, the potential use of force in the evacuation operation was regarded as a problem, and it was redesigned with an emphasis on the search and rescue mission.

they have a double helicopter hangar. To move the helicopter between the hangar and the helicopter deck, a helicopter traverse device developed by the JMSA was installed. The shipboard helicopters were the Bell 212 air-sea rescue helicopters in the early days. Then, with the aging of the Bell 212, they were superseded by the Bell 412 by 2014. As shipboard weapons, one Oerlikon 35 mm L/90 gun and one JM61-M 20 mm rotary cannon were set up. And later, JM61-M was upgraded to JM61-RFS, remotely operated version with an optical director.

== Construction and career ==
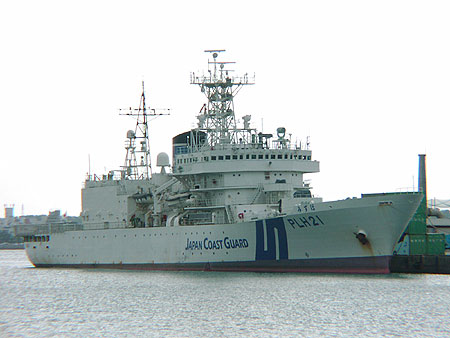
Mizuho at Okinawa, date unknown.

Completed on 19 March 1986, she was assigned to the Yokohama Coast Guard (3rd Regional Coast Guard). After that, with the commissioning of Shikishima, she was reassigned to the Nagoya Coast Guard (Fourth Division) on 16 December 1991.

In 1999, Mizuho was dispatched to East Timor for a non-combatant evacuation operation, and at this time, there is information that two sections of the Special Security Team were on board to ensure the security of port facilities.

In addition, on 5 July 2019, with the commissioning of the new Mizuho, he was reassigned to the Maizuru Maritime Security Department (8th Regional Coast Guard), and at this time the name was changed to Fusō. In addition, since the machines installed in the old Mizuho have been transferred to the new Mizuho as they are, Fusō is being operated without its own equipment for the time being.
