= Special Rescue Team =

- Active: 1975–present
- Country: Japan
- Branch: Japan Coast Guard
- Type: Special Forces
- Role: Maritime Search and Rescue
- Size: 41
- Part of: Directly under control of the Japan Coast Guard
- Garrison/HQ: Haneda Special Rescue Station, Tokyo, Japan
- Nickname: SRT or tokkyutai (特救隊)

The Special Rescue Team (特殊救難隊, Tokushu Kyūnan Tai) is the elite search and rescue unit of the Japan Coast Guard. The team was established to respond to special maritime accidents and disasters.

== History ==
On November 9, 1974, the Yuyo Maru No.10 (第十雄洋丸), a Japanese LPG tanker, collided with the Pacific Ares, a Liberian freighter, in Tokyo Bay (Yuyo Maru No.10 Incident). 3 hours after the collision, a major explosion and fire occurred on the tanker, which was a unique design carrying both naphtha and LPG. The naphtha fire lasted for a week before the Japan Self-Defense Forces sank the stricken vessel. The accident resulted in 33 deaths (28 on board Pacific Ares, 5 on board Yuyo Maru No.10) and 8 injuries.

The Special Rescue Team (SRT) was established in October 1975, with an initial strength of 5 members, in response to this accident. The team was initially trained by the Tokyo Fire Department's Special Rescue Team.

In April 1986, the SRT was shifted to its current location at the Haneda Special Rescue Station.

== Functions ==
The SRT is on stand-by around the clock, ready to carry out search and rescue operations nationwide, which demand sophisticated and specialised knowledge and skills. Such missions may involved firefighting on ships involving hazardous material and rescuing survivors from capsized or sinking vessels.

== Organisation ==
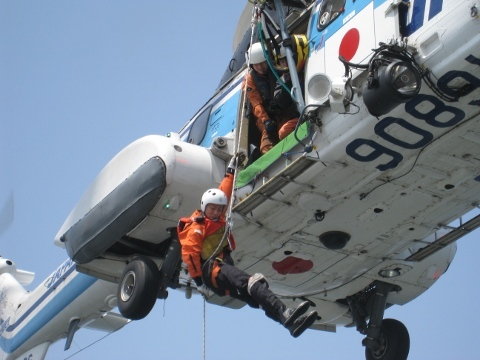
A SRT officer abseiling from AS332L1 during exercise.

The Special Rescue Team is located in the Haneda Special Rescue Station, within the Haneda Air Station of the 3rd Regional Coast Guard Headquarters in Tokyo, Japan. The SRT currently consists of a Commander, Deputy Commander, 3 members of staff and 36 SRT members operating in 6 teams. Members of the SRT are recruited from the best performing rescue divers in competitive meets conducted by the various regional coast guard commands.

Although the Special Rescue Team is located at the 3rd Regional Coast Guard Headquarters, its area of operations spans the whole of Japan's waters. The team can be deployed for search and rescue operations by aircraft or helicopter anywhere across the country, as requested by the local regional coast guard commands. Command authority of a rescue operation is normally transferred from the local coast guard command to the SRT upon arrival. The team's quick-response capability is provided by helicopter and aircraft located at the Haneda Air Station. The team operates two AS332L1 Super Puma helicopters and two Gulfstream V light jets for emergency response.

In the event of a large-scale disaster overseas, the SRT may also be deployed as part of an urgent international rescue task force. The Tokyo Metropolitan Police Department's R110 and Tokyo Fire Department's Hyper Rescue are the other elite rescue teams which may form such a task force alongside the Japan Coast Guard's Special Rescue Team.

Since establishment in October 1975 up till February 2002, the SRT had been activated in a total of 2,341 sorties.

The latest use of the SRT's skills was to carry out the search for people during the 2011 earthquake and tsunami. Large numbers of the team worked near and in the Fukushima nuclear power plant . The team worked with large numbers of specialist rescue teams due to the severity of the disaster.

== See also ==
- Special Security Team
