= Mizuho-class patrol vessel =

Class of PLH type patrol vessels

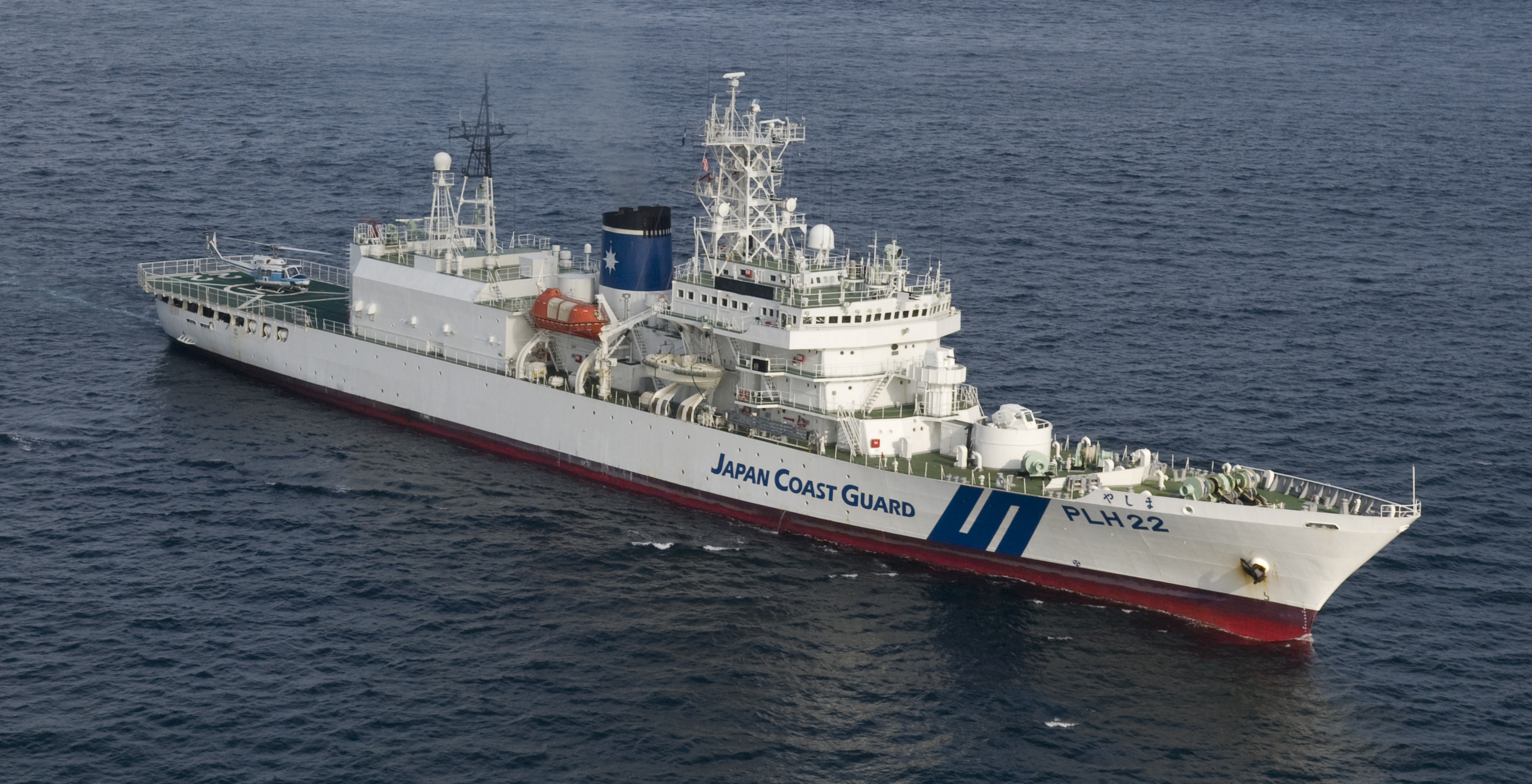
- Yashima (PLH-22)

Class overview
- Name: Mizuho class
- Operators: Japan Coast Guard
- Succeeded by: Shikishima class; Mizuho (PLH-41)
- Built: 1984–1988
- In commission: 1986–present
- Completed: 2
- Active: 1
- Retired: 1

General characteristics
- Type: PLH (Patrol vessel Large with Helicopter)
- Tonnage: 5,259 GT
- Displacement: 5,317 tonnes normal load
- Length: 130.0 m (426 ft 6 in)
- Beam: 15.5 m (50 ft 10 in)
- Draught: 8.8 m (28 ft 10 in)
- Propulsion: 2 × shafts; 2 × diesel engines
- Speed: 23 knots (43 km/h; 26 mph)
- Range: 8,500 nmi (15,700 km; 9,800 mi)
- Complement: 130
- Armament: 1 × L/90 35 mm gun; 1 × JM61 20 mm gun
- Aviation facilities: 2 × ASR helicopter

The Mizuho-class patrol vessel (みずほ型巡視船, Mizuho-gata-junnsi-senn) is a class of PLH type patrol vessels of the Japan Coast Guard (JCG; former Maritime Safety Agency, MSA).

== Background ==
In 1979, the International Maritime Organization (IMO) adopted the International Convention on Maritime Search and Rescue (SAR). In response to this Convention, Japan and the United States shared the search and rescue activities on the Pacific Ocean by concluding "Agreement on search and rescue at sea between the Japanese government and the United States government" (Japan-US SAR agreement). The scope of responsibility for Japan was north of 17 degrees north and 165 degrees east longitude, which meant sending rescue units from the coast of Japan to a distance of 1,200 nautical miles (2,200 km). At the end of 1980, certain large scale marine accidents occurred, and in March 1981 accidents of large tankers and cargo ships occurred in the Malacca Straits, and the development of wide area patrol system became an urgent task.

This class is built as higher-endurance cutters with a double helicopter hangar for this mission. Initially, it was also designed with the overseas non-combatant evacuation operations (NEO) in mind. However, since the JMSA is not a military but a civilian police organization and does not receive civilian control, the potential use of force in the evacuation operation was regarded as a problem, and it was redesigned with an emphasis on the search and rescue mission.

== Design ==
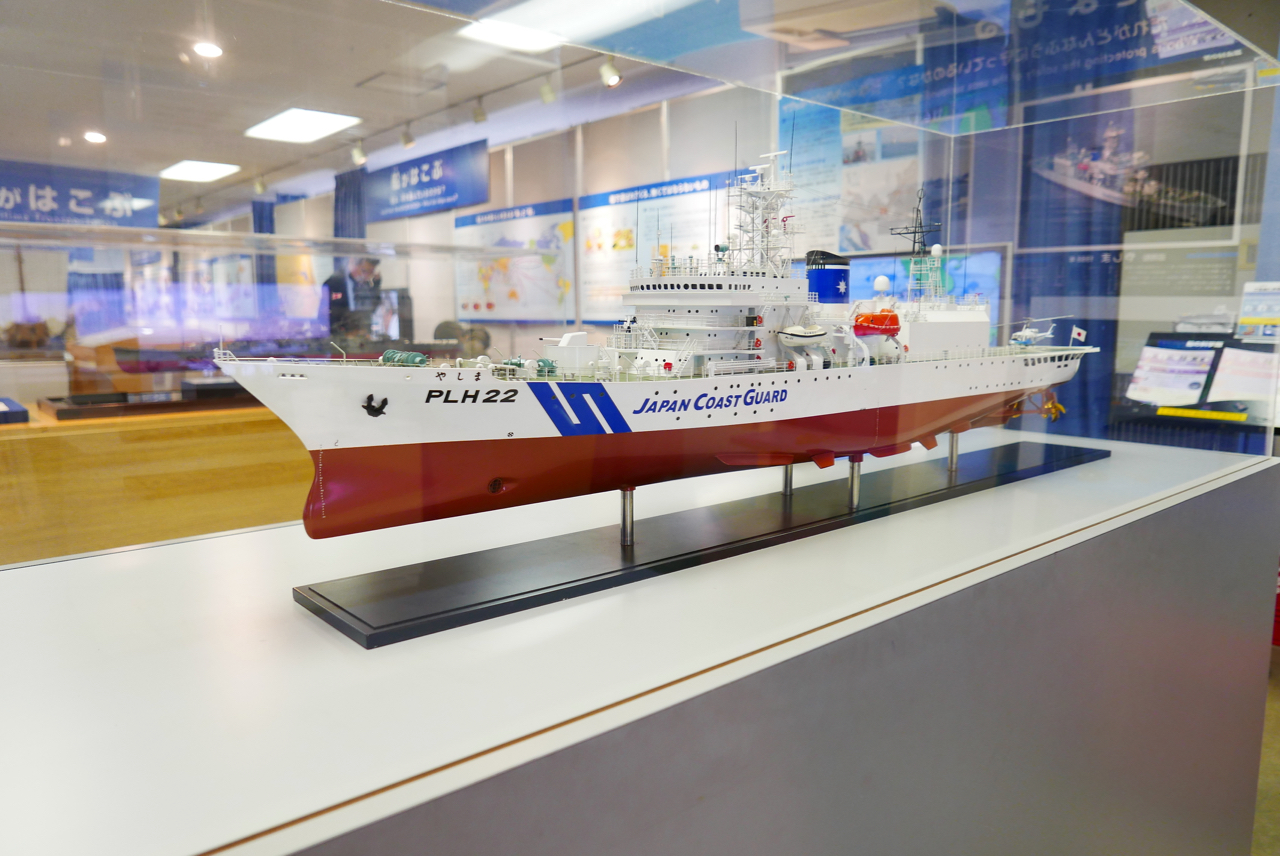
Model of Japan Coast Guard ship Yashima (PLH-22) at the Museum of Maritime Science in Tokyo.

Like preceding PLHs with a single helicopter, they have a long forecastle, but hull designs have changed significantly. The framing system was changed from transverse to longitudinal. Fin stabilizers were retained, but antiroll tanks were omitted as their hull was so big that they were unnecessary. In addition, a bulbous bow is introduced to reduce wave-making resistances.

Because they operate far away from the mainland Japan, the command and control capability is strengthened than preceding PLHs. A steering room, an air traffic control room and a communication room are arranged around the OIC section (operations room). Although it became unnecessary to correspond to NEO missions, due to the larger size of the hull, the maximum number of accommodating staff reached 900, and it is utilized as a space to accommodate the victims in the event of a disaster.

As above, they have a double helicopter hangar. To move the helicopter between the hangar and the helicopter deck, a helicopter traverse device developed by the JMSA was installed. The shipboard helicopters were the Bell 212 air-sea rescue helicopters in the early days. Then, with the aging of the Bell 212, they were superseded by the Bell 412 by 2014. As shipboard weapons, one Oerlikon 35 mm L/90 gun and one JM61-M 20 mm rotary cannon were set up. And later, JM61-M was upgraded to JM61-RFS, remotely operated version with an optical director.

== In service ==
These ships are operated as command ships of major Regional Coast Guard Headquarters flotilla or task forces, and are used to conduct many search and rescue operations especially in areas far-off shore.

In 1988, Yashima was dispatched to London to participate the 30th anniversary event of the IMO. A joint training exercise with Her Majesty's Coastguard was conducted off Southampton.

In 1999, Mizuho was dispatched to East Timor for a non-combatant evacuation operation, and at this time, there is information that two sections of the Special Security Team were on board to ensure the security of port facilities.

== Ships in the class ==
Hull no.	Ship name	Builder	Commission	Decommission	Homeport
PLH-21	Fusō (former Mizuho)	Nagasaki Shipyard, Mitsubishi Heavy Industries	19 March 1986	15 March 2024	Maizuru
PLH-22	Yashima	Tsurumi Shipyard, JFE Engineering	1 December 1988		Fukuoka
