= Japanese patrol vessel Mizuho =

Japanese Coast Guard ship

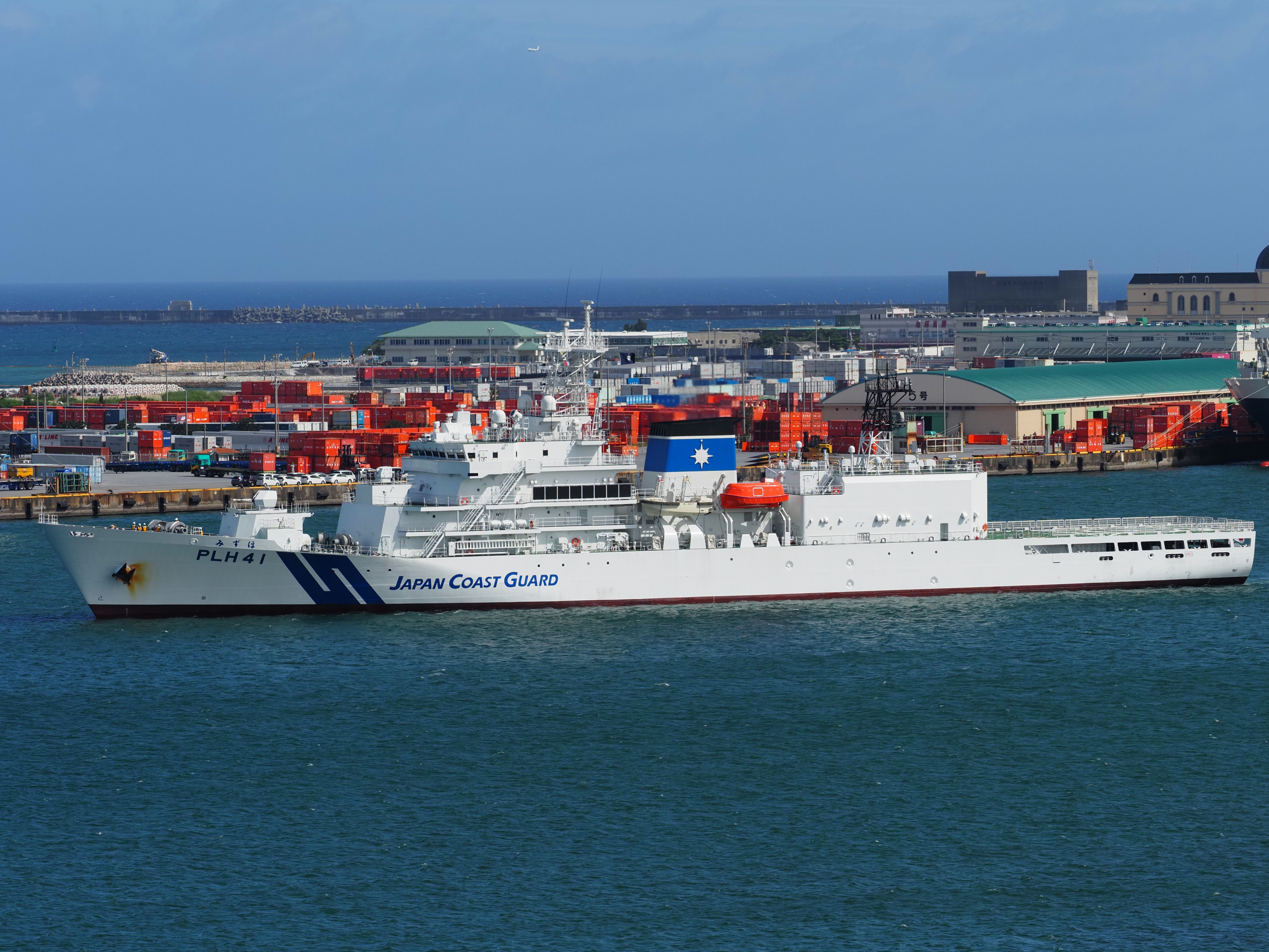
- Mizuho at Port of Naha

Class overview
- Name: Mizuho-class patrol vessel
- Operators: Japan Coast Guard
- Preceded by: Mizuho class
- Succeeded by: Shunkō class
- Completed: 1
- Active: 1
- Laid up: 1

History
- Name: Mizuho
- Ordered: 2015
- Builder: Mitsubishi Heavy Industries Shimonoseki Shipyard
- Launched: November 9, 2018
- Commissioned: August 22, 2019
- Identification: IMO number: 9820752; MMSI number: 431001410; Callsign: 7KEA; Pennant number PLH-41
- Status: Active

General characteristics
- Tonnage: 6,000 GT
- Length: 134 m (439 ft 8 in)
- Beam: 15.8 m (51 ft 10 in)
- Propulsion: 2 × shafts; 4 × diesel engines
- Speed: 25 knots (46 km/h; 29 mph)
- Armament: 1 × Bofors 40 mm gun; 1 × JM61 20 mm gun
- Aircraft carried: 2 × Bell 412 helicopters

The Japanese patrol boat Mizuho is a PLH type patrol vessels of the Japan Coast Guard. She is only ship in her class: the construction of a second ship was planned originally, but has not been achieved as of 2020 due to the start of construction of the Shunkō class and Reimei class.

== Design ==
Essentially, this ship is designed to be an enlarged version of the Kunigami class, with a helicopter deck and hangar as a successor to Mizuho (PLH-21). As well as being a platform for helicopters, she also functions as a depot ship: replenishing fuel, potable water and stores to small patrol crafts and resting their crew. And as a frontline command center, she also has excellent command and control functions.

She is armed with one Bofors L/70 40 mm gun (Bofors 40 Mk4) and one JM61-RFS 20 mm gun, each controlled by an electro-optical director. The Sikorsky S-76D helicopters was supposed to be used as the shipboard helicopters, but in actual, the Bell 412 helicopters were transferred directly from the PLH-21.
