= Special Security Team =

Tactical unit of the Japan Coast Guard

- 特殊警備隊 (Japanese)
- Active: 1985 - 1996 (Kaikei-tai); 1996 - Present
- Country: Japan
- Agency: Japan Coast Guard (former Maritime Safety Agency)
- Type: Police tactical unit
- Headquarters: Osaka Special Security Station, Kobe, Japan
- Motto: Semper Paratus (常に備えよ, Tsune ni sonaeyo)
- Abbreviation: SST

Structure
- Officers: Classified

Notables
- Significant operation(s): Various anti-crime operations Anti-North Korean spy ship skirmishes (1999-early 2002)

The Special Security Team (特殊警備隊, Tokushu-keibi-tai) is a police tactical unit of the Japan Coast Guard, based at the Osaka Special Security Station (大阪特殊警備基地). The acronym of its Kanji name has already been used by other units (Note: Special Riot Squads (特別警備隊, Tokubetsu-keibi-tai, "Tokkei-tai") are part-time deployable maritime law enforcement teams of each Regional Coast Guard Headquarters for riot control, port security or other maritime security operations.), the abbreviation "SST" is used for this team.

The 1997 Maritime Safety Agency white paper stated that the SST's mission is to deal with security incidents in maritime waters, including boarding ships and anti-terrorist operations.

== Background ==
In 1985, the Maritime Safety Agency established the Maritime Riot Squad (関西空港海上警備隊, Kansai-kuko Kaijō-keibi-tai; Kaikei-tai) to protect the maritime side of the Kansai International Airport cooperating with the ground-side Riot Police Unit of the Osaka Prefectural Police. At the beginning, there were only 8 members. But due to the airport construction, the unit's manpower was increased to 24 operators.

In 1990, due to the plutonium transport mission, the number of members was increased to 37 and the equipment was updated. A detachment corp for the escort mission was organized and called Onboard Security Team (警乗隊, Keijou-tai), but after the mission ended it merged with Kaikei-tai. In 1996, Kaikei-tai was renamed to the SST.

== Organization ==
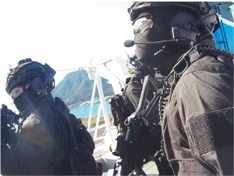
SST operator

=== Structure ===
Although the structure is not disclosed, it is said that under command of the team leader, seven sections consisting of eight operators are organized. Specialists such as EOD and EMT are assigned for each sections.

SST is based at the Osaka Special Security Station (大阪特殊警備基地), adjacent to the Kansai International Airport, and able to be deployed nationwide by Saab 340B and Eurocopter EC225 Super Puma of the Japan Coast Guard.

=== Recruitment and training ===
Members at the time of the establishment of Kaikei-tai were mainly scouted from Tokkei-tai. After establishing the SST, the unit exclusively recruits from the entire Japan Coast Guard.

Because it was the first counter-terrorism unit for MSA, Kaikei-tai faced considerable difficulties. However basic close quarters combat and marksman techniques were acquired in the GSDF Ranger Course at Fuji School, maritime counter-terrorism operations was an unknown field even for Rangers, so the MSA officers had no choice but to conduct trial and error by themselves about how to apply those techniques in maritime operations. In 1991, Kaikei-tai got an opportunity to invite combat advisers from the United States Navy SEALs under the financial support of the Sasakawa Foundation and with their instructions, its techniques and tactics were improved to international standards.

=== Equipment ===
At the beginning, the Kaikei-tai used Smith & Wesson Model 19 revolvers as its main sidearm, equipped with 4-inch barrels. They were later seen using the Smith & Wesson Model 5906. In 1987, Howa Type 64 designated marksman rifles and Howa M1500 sniper rifles were issued to the Kaikei-tai.

In 1988, Heckler & Koch MP5A5/SD6 submachine guns were adopted. American advisers, while admiring the shooting skills of the MSA officers, pointed out that these revolvers were fundamentally lacking in firepower. The SIG Sauer P228 was adopted by 1992 with the Howa Type 89 assault rifle introduced. The SST has access to anti-materiel rifles manufactured by McMillan Firearms.

== Operational history ==
In 1989, Kaikei-tai operatives were involved in storming a Panama-registered vessel after receiving requests via radio for assistance in the East China Sea near Okinawan waters after British officers were attacked by Filipino crewmembers during a riot. All of the arrested crew members were then taken into custody.

In 1992, the Keijou-tai was deployed on board to guard ships carrying nuclear waste from France all the way to Japan, protecting them from any sort of staged attacks from any radical anti-nuclear activist groups.

In 1999, patrol vessel Mizuho was dispatched to East Timor for non-combatant evacuation operation, and at this time, there is information that two sections of SST were on board to ensure the security of port facilities.

In 2000, the SST was deployed after crew members in a Singapore-flagged cargo ship in the East China Sea rioted against their senior officers.

In 2002, the SST worked with the Korea Coast Guard's Sea Special Attack Team as part of securing the venues in the FIFA 2002 games.

The SST has participated in several Proliferation Security Initiative exercises in Australia under "Exercise Pacific Protector" since September 2003.

The SST was stationed on the Yūshin Maru No. 2 after Sea Shepherd protesters in 2008 confronted crewmembers of the Nisshin Maru.

From the 2010s, SST operators were deployed to participate in Japanese contingents in various anti-piracy missions near Somali waters.

== See also ==
- Special Rescue Team
- Maritime Security Response Team (MSRT) - counterpart of the United States Coast Guard.
