= Shipboard helicopter operations =

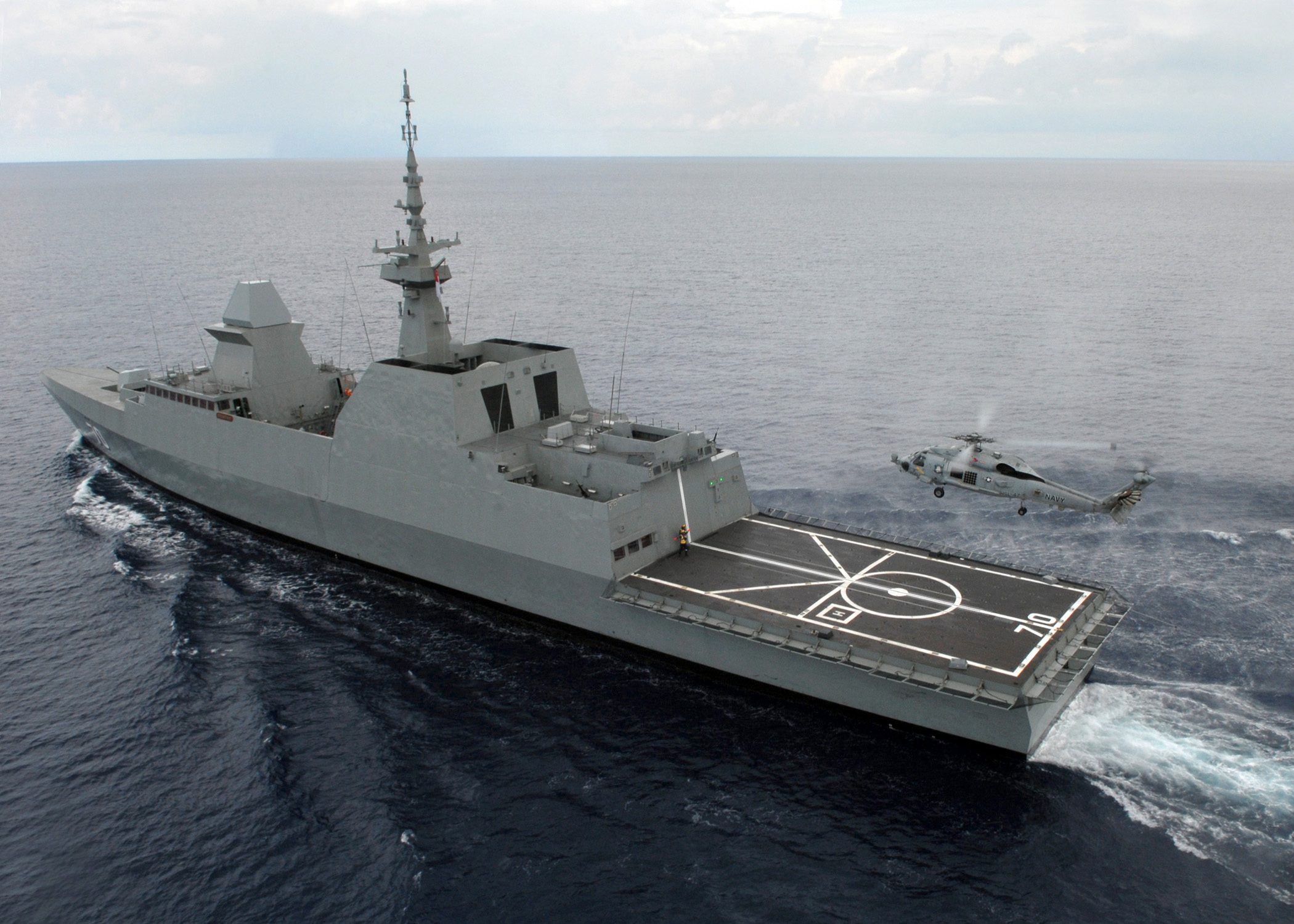
A United States Navy SH-60 Seahawk helicopter landing on the Singaporean Formidable class frigate RSS Steadfast in 2008

Shipboard helicopter operations is the use of techniques which allow operation of rotary wing aircraft from naval vessels. In the case of military vessels the operations also include tactics and associated weapons and troops.

Landing a helicopter on the flight deck of what is sometimes a small ship in heavy seas presents the pilot with challenges that include: deck movement, turbulent airflows, and using control systems that were not necessarily designed for the marine environment.

Flight operations of shipboard helicopter operations include preparing the aircraft and crew for the mission, cargo and ordnance handling (for armed helicopters), passenger supervision, aircraft departure, communications with the ship during the mission and recovery.

Apart from the more routine passenger and cargo transportation missions, shipboard helicopter operations are used by civilian and military operators to conduct search and rescue missions, while what for the civilian operators is often electronic news gathering, for the military becomes intelligence gathering missions or battlefield surveillance and reconnaissance. Some helicopters, such as the Kamov Ka-31 airborne early warning helicopter, fulfil specialised roles. The SH-60 Seahawk's roles can include antisubmarine warfare, anti-surface warfare, special forces insertion, combat search and rescue, vertical replenishment and medical evacuation.

The first shipboard helicopter operations were attempted by the Wehrmacht during the Second World War in the Baltic Sea. The British had trialled autogyros with aircraft carriers before the war but joined with the USN in testing the Sikorsky helicopters at sea providing the Empire Mersey and its replacement the SS Daghestan in 1942/43. The first purpose-built helicopter operation vessels were Liberty ships converted by the US Army in June 1945 into floating repair depots. They included special landing platforms to accommodate Sikorsky R-4 helicopters.
