= Combined diesel and diesel =

Two-compression-ignition-engine, one-drive shaft propulsion

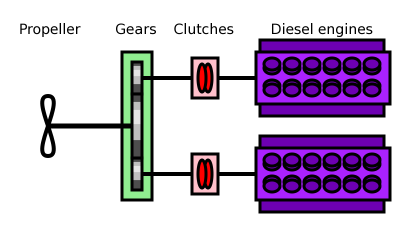
Principle of a CODAD propulsion system

Combined diesel and diesel (CODAD) is a propulsion system for ships using two diesel engines to power a single propeller shaft.

== System ==
Combined marine propulsion

Combined diesel or gas (CODOG)
Combined diesel and gas (CODAG)
Combined diesel-electric and diesel (CODLAD)
Combined diesel–electric and gas (CODLAG)
Combined diesel and diesel (CODAD)
Combined steam and gas (COSAG)
Combined gas or gas (COGOG)
Combined gas and gas (COGAG)
Combined gas and steam (COGAS)
Combined nuclear and steam propulsion (CONAS)
Integrated electric propulsion (IEP or IFEP)

A gearbox and clutches enable either of the engines or both of them together to drive the shaft. Two advantages over simply using a single, larger diesel engine of the same total power output are that (1) diesel engines have somewhat better specific fuel consumption at 75% to 85% max output than they do at only 50% output, and (2) there is a weight and size advantage to using two higher-speed engines compared to a single lower-speed engine, even with the slightly larger gearbox system.

== CODAD vessels ==
Passenger and Car Ferry Ships

- M/F Povl Anker

Containerships

- MV ACX Crystal

Coast Guard Offshore General-Purpose Cutters

- Iwami-class patrol vessel
- Shiretoko-class patrol vessel
- Tanjung Datu-class patrol vessel

Coast Guard Offshore Security Patrol Cutters

- Mizuho-class patrol vessel
- Ojika-class patrol vessel

Coast Guard Multi-mission Cutters

- Kunigami-class patrol vessel
- Teresa Magbanua-class patrol vessel

Coast Guard Interceptor Cutters

- Aso-class patrol vessel
- Hateruma-class patrol vessel
- Hida-class patrol vessel
- Anping-class cutter
- Tsurugi-class patrol vessel

Coast Guard Security Cutters

- Heritage-class cutter
- Mizuho (PLH-41)
- Shikishima-class patrol vessel

Patrol Corvettes / Navy OPVs

- Guaicamacuto-class patrol boat
- Kedah-class offshore patrol vessel

Corvettes

- Bung Karno-class corvette
- Bung Tomo-class corvette
- Diponegoro-class corvette
- Doha-class corvette
- Jacinto-class corvette
- Kasturi-class corvette
- Laksamana-class corvette
- Parchim-class corvette
- Steregushchiy-class corvette
- Tuo Chiang-class corvette
- Type 056 corvette

Frigates

- Formidable-class frigate
- Frégate de Défense et d'Intervention
- Jose Rizal-class frigate
- La Fayette-class frigate
- Lekiu-class frigate
- Maharaja Lela-class frigate
- Miguel Malvar-class frigate
- RN Type-31 Inspiration-class
- Tamandaré-class frigate
- Type 054A frigate

LSDs (landing ships, dock)

- Whidbey Island-class dock landing ship

LPDs (landing platforms, dock)

- Endurance-class landing platform dock
- Galicia-class landing platform dock
- Makassar-class landing platform dock
- Tarlac-class landing platform dock

Amphibious Flat-topped Ships

- Dokdo-class amphibious assault ship
- Ōsumi-class dock landing ship

FACs (fast attack-craft)

- Clurit-class fast attack craft
- Cyclone-class coastal patrol ship
- Sampari-class fast attack craft

Cruise Ships

- MV Piano Land (formerly MV Oriana)
