= BRP Melchora Aquino =

Vessel of the Philippine Coast Guard

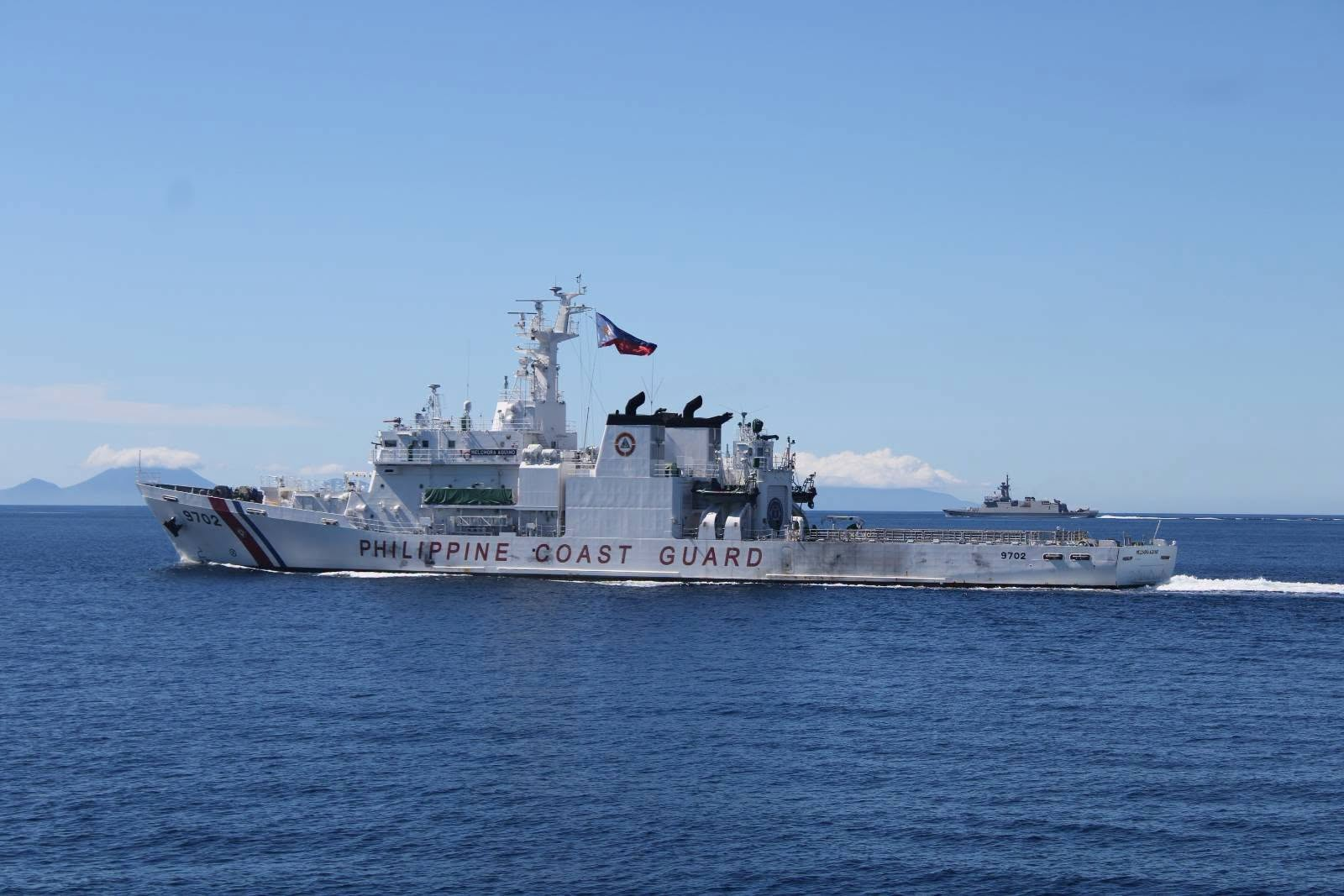
- BRP Melchora Aquino in 2026.

History

Philippines
- Name: BRP Melchora Aquino
- Namesake: Melchora Aquino de Ramos
- Ordered: February 7, 2020
- Builder: Mitsubishi Shipbuilding Co., Ltd.
- Cost: 14.55 billion yen for two units
- Launched: November 18, 2021
- Acquired: May 22, 2022
- Commissioned: June 12, 2022
- Identification: IMO number: 9908671; MMSI number: 548229800; Callsign: 4DJG4; Hull number: 9702
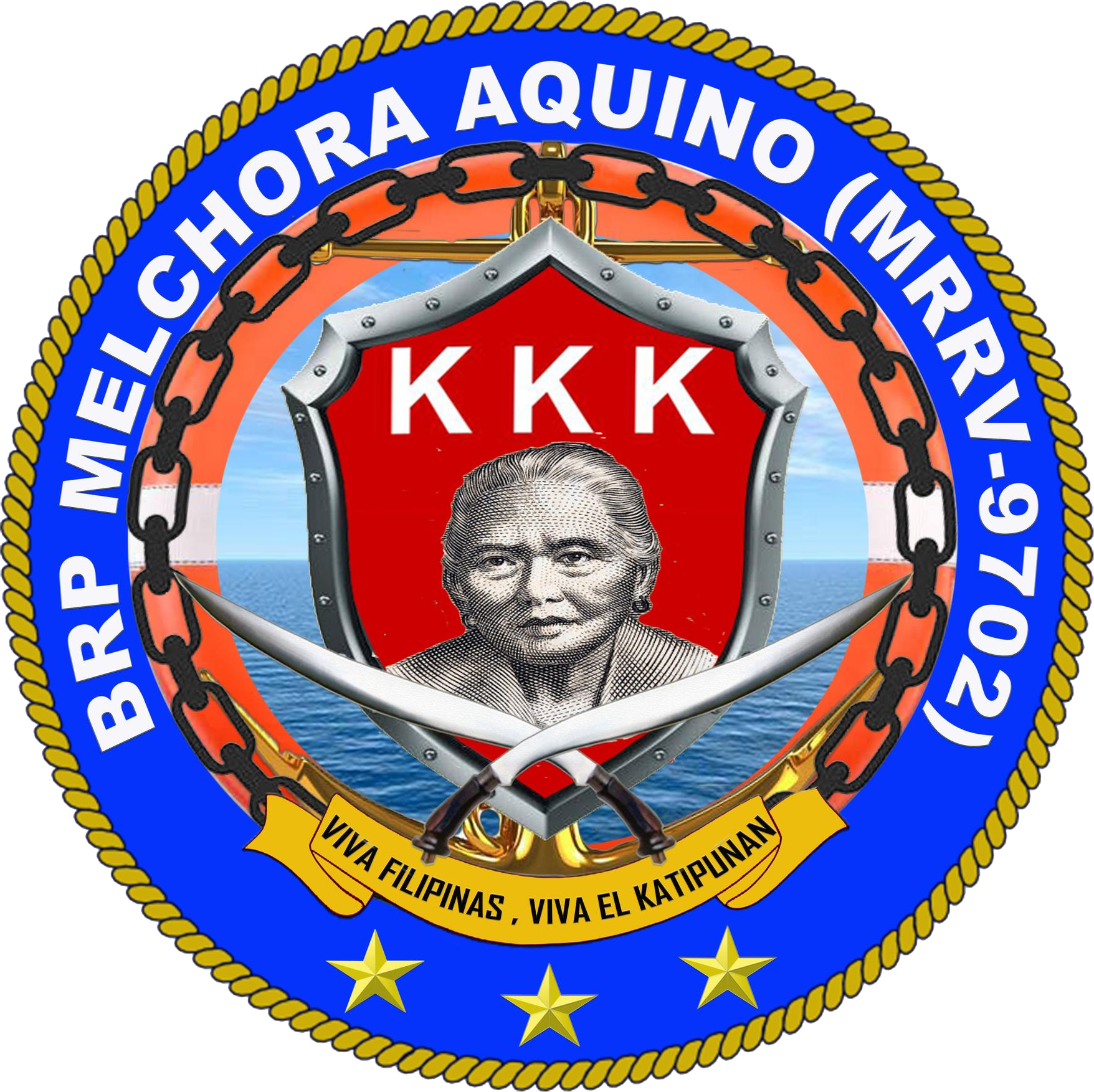
- Badge

General characteristics
- Length: 96.6 m (316 ft 11 in)
- Beam: 11.5 m (37 ft 9 in)
- Draft: 4.3 m (14 ft 1 in)
- Propulsion: 2 × diesel engines, with total output of 13,200 kW (17,700 shp)
- Speed: 24 knots (44 km/h) maximum sustained
- Range: 4,000 nmi (7,400 km) at 12 knots (22 km/h; 14 mph)
- Endurance: more than 15 days
- Boats & landing craft carried: 2 × RHIB
- Complement: 67 officers and sailors max
- Armament: To be determined
- Aircraft carried: 1 × Airbus H145 helicopter
- Aviation facilities: Hangar and flight deck for 1 × Airbus H145 helicopter

BRP Melchora Aquino (MRRV-9702) is the second ship of the Teresa Magbanua class of patrol vessels operated by the Philippine Coast Guard (PCG). The service officially classifies her as a multi-role response vessel (MRRV). At almost 97 meters long, she is one of the largest, and most modern vessels of the PCG.

She was named after Melchora Aquino, a Filipino revolutionary during the Spanish colonial period.

== Construction and design ==
The vessel was constructed by Mitsubishi Shipbuilding Co. Ltd in Shimonoseki, Japan based on the Kunigami-class patrol vessels. The contract was under the "Maritime Safety Capability Improvement Project Phase 2" project of the Department of Transportation in 2016. The deal was worth 14.55 billion yen for two units from a JICA STEP Loan of 16.455 billion yen and was signed on February 7, 2020.

The vessel has a length of 96.6 meters (316 ft 11 in), a maximum speed of not less than 24 knots (44 km/h; 28 mph), and has a complement of 67 officers and crew members. She is powered by two 6,600-kilowatt (8,900 hp) diesel engines. She has a helideck, and a hangar that can accommodate the H145T2 helicopter of the PCG. She also has a hyperbaric chamber for those who have diving sickness and a survivor room that can accommodate those who will be rescued.

The ship was launched on the November 18, 2021, which was held by Mitsubishi Heavy Industries. Representatives from the Philippine Coast Guard attended the short ceremony virtually. She sailed from Japan to the Philippines on May 27, 2022 in a ceremony attended by Admiral George Ursabia, Undersecretary for Maritime of the Department of Transportation (DOTr), and Admiral Artemio Abu, Commandant of the Philippine Coast Guard alongside Philippine Embassy representatives.

== History ==
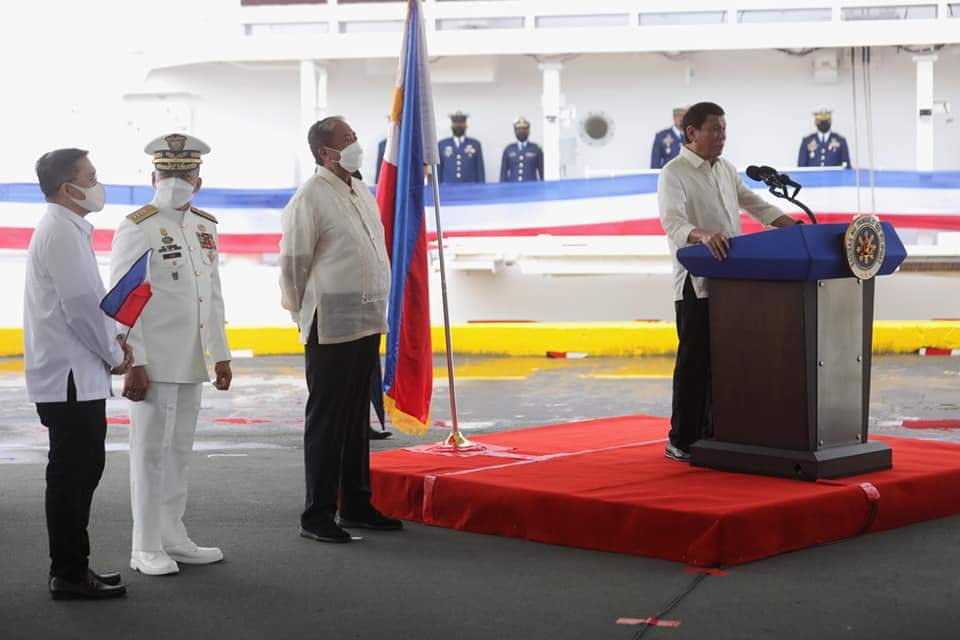
President Rodrigo Duterte giving a speech during BRP Melchora Aquino's commissioning

The ship was officially accepted into service less than two weeks after arriving in the Philippines, arriving on June 1, 2022. On June 12, 2022, the Philippine Coast Guard held the commissioning ceremony at the South Harbor.

Melchora Aquino was deployed in June 2024 near Lubang Island in order to respond to incursions made by China Coast Guard (CCG) 5303.

Melchora Aquino along with BRP Malapascua escorted the civilian-led mission to the West Philippine Sea between 26 May to 30 May 2025.

In January 2026, the Melchora Aquino was deployed in SAR operations during the sinking of the MV Trisha Kerstin 3.

In June 2026, the Melchora Aquino was involved in a Maritime Cooperative Activity (MCA) exercise with the US Coast Guard.
