= Shiretoko =

Shiretoko (Ainu: sir·etok, "end of the Land/Earth") may refer to:

- Shiretoko National Park, in Hokkaidō, Japan
- Shiretoko Peninsula, in Hokkaidō, Japan
- Shiretoko, former name of Novikovo in Sakhalin Oblast, Russia; previously administered as a part of Karafuto Prefecture
- Shiretoko-class patrol vessel
