= Hateruma-class patrol vessel =

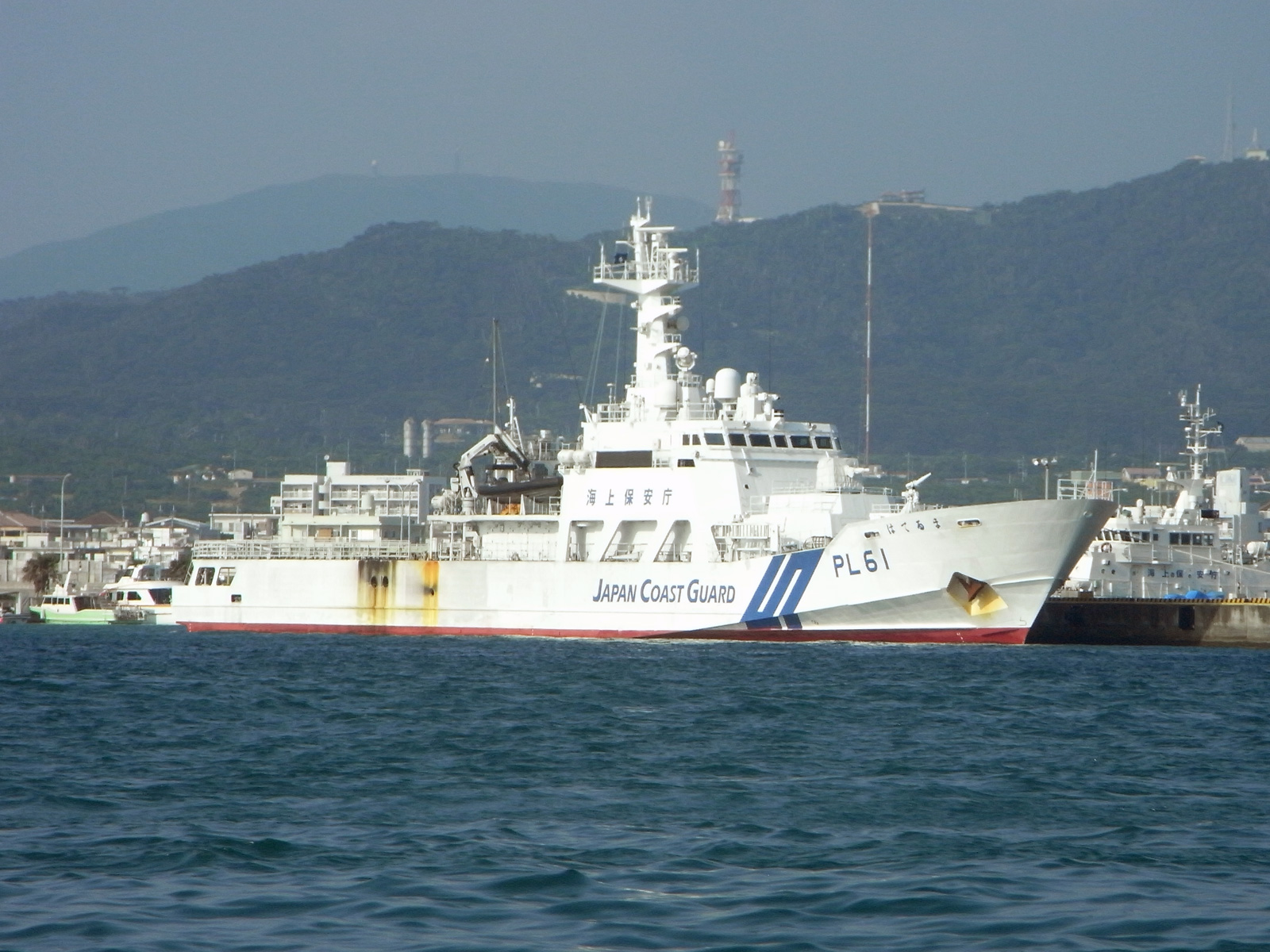
- Hateruma (PL61), lead ship of the class

Class overview
- Name: Hateruma class
- Builders: Mitsui Engineering & Shipbuilding, Mitsubishi Heavy Industries
- Operators: Japan Coast Guard
- Preceded by: Aso class
- Succeeded by: Kunigami class
- Built: 2005–2010
- In commission: 2008–present
- Completed: 9
- Active: 9

General characteristics
- Type: 1,000 ton-class PL (Patrol vessel, Large)
- Tonnage: 1,300 Gross tonnage
- Length: 89.0 m (292.0 ft)
- Beam: 11.0 m (36.1 ft)
- Propulsion: 4 × Waterjets; 4 × diesel engines
- Speed: 30 knots (56 km/h; 35 mph)
- Boats & landing craft carried: 2 × 7 m class RHIBs; 2 × 4.8 m class RHIBs
- Complement: 30
- Armament: One Mk44 Bushmaster II 30 mm gun with optical FCS
- Aviation facilities: aft helicopter deck and refueling facilities

Hateruma-class patrol vessel (Japanese: はてるま型巡視船) is a class of PL type patrol vessels of the Japan Coast Guard. PL stands for "Patrol vessel Large", and the class name "Hateruma" is named after Hateruma-jima, the southernmost inhabited island of Japan.

Aiming at policing of Senkaku Islands, they can be a floating base for smaller patrol crafts or helicopters, so they are called "拠点機能強化型巡視船", Patrol vessel, Sea-basing capability enhanced. The lead ship of the class, Hateruma (PL61), was one of the JCG's vessels involved in the 2010 Senkaku boat collision incident, including Yonakuni (PL63) and Mizuki (PS class), both of which collided with the Chinese fishing trawler Minjinyu 5179 which was then boarded and seized.

Ships of this class are equipped with one single-mounted Mk44 Bushmaster II 30mm autocannon with laser-optical fire-control system. The 30 mm caliber autocannon is an entirely new caliber for the JCG, and it gives this class increased firepower compared with usual 1,000 ton-class patrol vessels which normally have only one manually controlled 20 mm Vulcan Gatling gun. This 30 mm gun system is more powerful than a 20 mm Vulcan with a Remote Firing System (RFS) associated with the simplified laser-optical fire-control system (FCS) which is on board recent PMs and PSs such as the Tsurugi class, and more reasonable than the larger Bofors 40 mm L/70 gun with laser-optical FCS which is mounted on board "High-speed, High-functionality" PLs such as the Hida and Aso classes.

This class has the helicopter deck wide enough to operate with Eurocopter EC225 helicopters to airlift supplies for small patrol crafts keeping Senkaku Islands under surveillance. And the broadband SATCOM system of this class can relay video data from helicopters to the ground station or the HQ of the JCG. This class is equipped with the LIDAR system to acquire targets with high accuracy, and at the same time, this system enables them to perform search and rescue mission more safely.

The JCG had intended to build a number of ships of this design for the successor of PL-101 Shiretoko-class, but this class may not suitable for SAR mission because of the insufficient low-speed mobility. So the construction project has switched to the PL-09 Kunigami-class, utilized variant of this class.

The Shiretoko class is the older 1,000 ton-class PLs, twenty-eight ships were built in late 1970s and early 1980s. It was announced that Japan plans to transfer two of the older Shiretoko-class type patrol vessels to the Philippines Coast Guard in 2012.

== Ships in the class ==
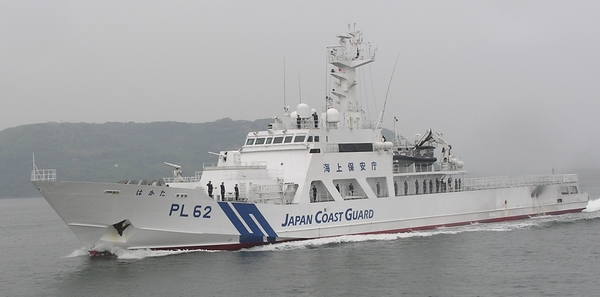
JCG Ishigaki (ex-Hakata) (PL-62) in Okinawa

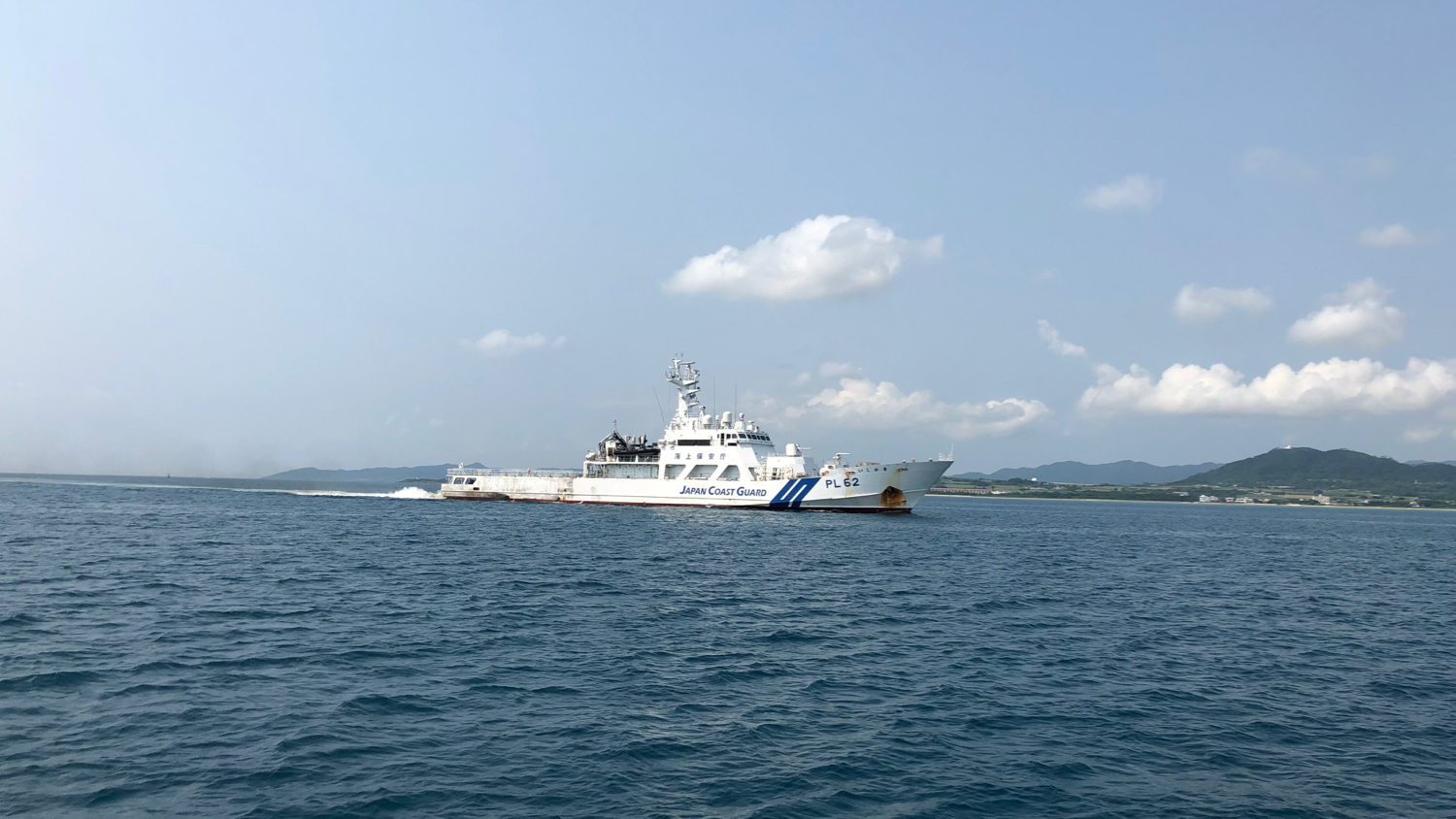
JCG Ishigaki (ex-Hakata) (PL62) patrolling the Yaeyama Islands

Ships in the class
Pennant Number	Ship Name	Builder	Commission	Homeport
PL61	Hateruma	Mitsui Engineering & Shipbuilding	31 March 2008	Ishigaki
PL62	Ishigaki (former Hakata)	Mitsui Engineering & Shipbuilding	2 February 2009	Ishigaki
PL63	Kunigami (former Yonakuni)	Mitsui Engineering & Shipbuilding	2 February 2009	Nakagusuku
PL64	Shimokita (former Motobu)	Mitsui Engineering & Shipbuilding	3 March 2009	Naha
PL65	Shiretoko (former Kunigami)	Mitsui Engineering & Shipbuilding	12 March 2009	Nakagusuku
PL66	Shikine	Mitsubishi Heavy Industries	7 October 2009	Shimoda
PL67	Amagi	Mitsui Engineering & Shipbuilding	11 March 2010	Amami
PL68	Suzuka	Mitsui Engineering & Shipbuilding	11 March 2010	Owase
PL69	Koshiki	Mitsubishi Heavy Industries	9 March 2010	Kagoshima

== See also ==
- List of Japan Coast Guard vessels and aircraft

== Future reading ==
- "Ships of Japan Coast Guard". Ships of the World (692). Kaijinn-sha: 51. July 2008.
- Shigehiro Sakamoto (July 2008). "60th Anniversary of JCG: For near future". Ships of the World (692). Kaijinn-sha: 132–137.
- Yoshifumi Mayama (July 2008). "60th Anniversary of JCG: Technical history of its ship". Ships of the World (692). Kaijinn-sha: 138–143.
