= Teresa Magbanua-class patrol vessel =

Class of Filipino offshore patrol vessel

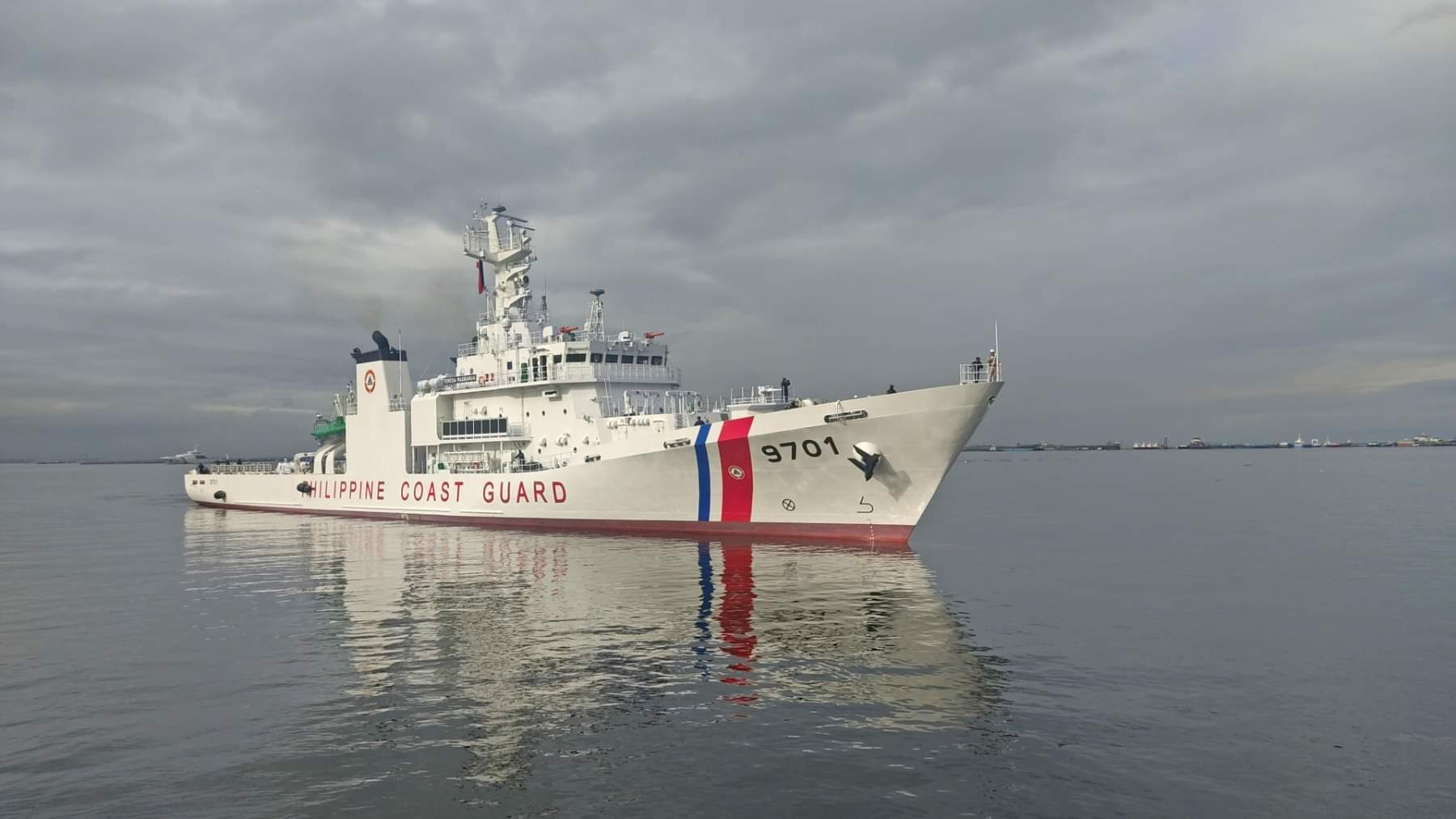
- BRP Teresa Magbanua (MRRV-9701)

Class overview
- Name: Teresa Magbanua class
- Builders: Mitsubishi Shipbuilding Co. Ltd., Shimonoseki, Japan
- Operators: Philippine Coast Guard
- Cost: per ship (2020); ¥7.275B or; ~₱3.395B or; ~$67.9M (if $1 = ₱50)
- In commission: from 2022
- Planned: 7
- Building: 5
- Completed: 2
- Active: 2

General characteristics
- Type: patrol ship
- Tonnage: 2,260 GT
- Length: 96.6 m (316 ft 11 in)
- Beam: 11.5 m (37 ft 9 in) (moulded)
- Draft: 4.3 m (14 ft 1 in) (moulded)
- Depth: 5.2 m (17 ft 1 in) (moulded)
- Propulsion: 2 × diesel engines, with total output of 13,200 kW (17,700 shp); electric propulsion system for low speeds (provisioned)
- Speed: more than 24 knots (44 km/h; 28 mph) maximum speed
- Range: more than 4,000 nmi (7,400 km; 4,600 mi) at cruising speed
- Endurance: more than 15 days
- Boats & landing craft carried: 2 x RHIB; Underwater ROV
- Complement: 67 officers and enlisted
- Sensors & processing systems: Furuno FAR series X & S-band navigation radars; NAVICS® integrated secure communications & direction-finding system by Rohde & Schwarz; Teledyne FLIR® EOIR sensors
- Armament: 1x 30mm Aselsan SMASH 200/30 RCWS (To be installed)
- Aircraft carried: Airbus H145 helicopter
- Aviation facilities: hangar and helicopter deck

The Teresa Magbanua-class patrol vessels is class of patrol vessel built for the Philippine Coast Guard (PCG). The class is based on the Japan Coast Guard's Kunigami-class design.

The ships are named after heroines of the Philippines, with the lead ship, the future BRP Teresa Magbanua being a heroine of the resistance movements against the Spanish, American, and Japanese occupying forces. Teresa Magbanua-class patrol vessels are officially classified as Multi-role Response Vessels (MRRV).

== Design and features ==
The original Kunigami-class patrol vessels have no hangar, and have a single central funnel/chimney to which two RHIBs are placed, one each beside it; a 3rd workboat and its associated launch-and-recovery crane are also placed behind them. The Teresa Magbanua class was modified to having split chimneys (one each on the edges of both the port and starboard sides) in order to create added space for a centerline hangar, which in turn led to each of the two RHIBs being relocated beside that hangar. Thus the space occupied by the third workboat and its associated launch-and-recovery crane from Kunigami-class design ended up being removed in the process.

The successor of Kunigami class' first two ships (1st batch order), the six Iwami-class patrol vessels, their split chimneys are placed near the edges of the ship's midsides, thus preserving those open side spaces as is the Kunigami class. The Kunigami class' rear foredeck is occupied by M61 Vulcan 20 mm (0.79 in) gatling-type six-barreled cannon on a JM61-RFS mount (on earlier ships) or a Mk44 Bushmaster II 30 mm (1.2 in) single-barreled rapid-fire cannon (on later ships). Ships of the Teresa Magbanua class also has that same structure, but no cannon since Japanese law is reportedly prohibited to export such weapons.

The class is designed with an optional low-speed electric propulsion system for fuel-economy. This feature is crucial as a proactive measure against the expected petroleum price hike fluctuations as time pass, or worse continued price increases. Also, since fuel economy equals reduced petroleum use, thus the Philippines also having another contribution to the COP21 Paris Agreement; such contribution was already exemplified from their earlier inducted all-aluminium 84-meter (275 ft 7 in) Gabriela Silang-class patrol ship. To begin, one of the main jobs of the Coast Guard is environmental protection.

The class employs underwater ROVs for subsea surveillance. Aside from underwater search and rescue missions, they will also come in handy for intercepting near-sea-surface submersibles carrying drugs or other smuggled items. This include vessels having their freeboards and superstructures so low that the usual 2D marine radars, cameras (optical, infrared, night vision), and other surface-search-oriented sensors will have a hard time detecting them. In general, such ROVs will serve as force-multipliers (supporting the navy) in expanding the Philippines' overall domain awareness of their underseas to whatever subsea target detectable. The Philippine Coast Guard clarified that the ships are designed for law enforcement duties, to conduct environmental and humanitarian missions, as well as maritime security operations and patrol missions.

According to the Philippine Coast Guard (PCG), the MRRV has a length of 96.6 meters (316 ft 11 in), a maximum speed of not less than 24 knots (44 km/h; 28 mph), and has a complement of 67 crew members.They have two 6,600 kW (8,900 hp) diesel engines.

The class' 2 diesels mean 2 larger diesels are required to equal the same output power from 4 smaller diesels (i.e., 4-engine CODAD config, like the ones in Jose Rizal-class frigates): the larger the diesel engine the more fuel-efficient, thus again, lesser diesel oil consumption. However, diesel's max efficiency is only when used at ~75% to ~85% output but ships don't always run on their own specified sustained high speed ratings; and though diesel engine might still be efficient at ~50% output, it still is a reduced efficiency, and inefficient below that which are the outputs during the ship running at low speeds (while the 4-engine CODAD config is better at those situations since smaller diesels mean using more output to compensate from their default less power output), but then again, the Magbanua-class is provisioned with e-drive to deal with those situations which is even more fuel-efficient compared to smaller diesels found on CODAD config.

The MRRV's helideck and hangar can accommodate the PCG's Airbus H145 helicopter (previous designation: Eurocopter EC145-T2). She also has a hyperbaric chamber for those who have diving sickness and a survivor room that can accommodate those who will be rescued. In addition, they will be equipped with a maritime integrated communications system known as NAVICS, which will be provided by Rohde & Schwarz in collaboration with NTT.

== Project planning and funding ==
The ships are acquired under the 94-meter Multi-Role Response Vessels Acquisition Project of the Philippine Coast Guard, which in turn is part of the "Maritime Safety Capability Improvement Project Phase II of the Philippine Coast Guard and the Department of Transportation (DOTr). The project was funded by the Japan International Cooperation Agency's (JICA) Official Development Assistance (ODA) loan, with JICA will provide JPY16,455,000,000.00, while the Philippine government will shoulder Php 1,218,000,000.00 of the entire project value.

Japanese shipbuilders were shortlisted by the DOTr, among them Japan Marine United Co., Mitsubishi Shipbuilding Co. Ltd., and Mitsui Engineering & Shipbuilding.

Mitsubishi Shipbuilding won the tender against other Japanese shipbuilders with a bid price of Y14,550,000,000.

Under the project terms, the MRRVs will be used by the PCG for the following purposes:

- Primary rescue vessels within the PCG Districts’ areas of responsibility (AOR) when the extent of the disaster is beyond the capability of floating assets deployed within the area
- Assistance in the control of oil pollution and protection of the marine environment
- Enforcement of applicable maritime laws within the designated AOR, particularly relating to illegal fishing and sea patrol
- Service as platform for rapid response during relief operations in the area
- Transport of personnel and logistical support.

On November 9, 2023, NEDA released a statement that Phase 3 of the Maritime Safety Capability Improvement Project for the Philippine Coast Guard was accepted. It calls for five additional multi-role response vessels with a five-year integrated logistics support under a PHP 29.3 billion contract, which is financed under a Japanese Official Development Assistance (ODA) loan.

On 17 May 2024, Philippine Foreign Affairs Secretary Enrique Manalo and Japanese Ambassador to the Philippines Kazuya Endo signed a low-interest loan agreement for the provision of a further five (5) patrol vessels to the Philippine Coast Guard.

On 5 January 2026, the DOTr announced invitations to bid for five additional MRRVs. A Notice to Proceed was released to start construction of new Teresa Magbanua-class vessels. The PCG expects these ships to be in service between 2027 and 2028.

== Construction and launching ==
The first of its class, the Teresa Magbanua (9701), held its first steel cutting ceremony on 18 December 2020. The ship was launched on 26 July 2021.

The Teresa Magbanua is scheduled to undergo sea trials by late 2021, and sail for Manila by March 2022.

Construction on the second ship of the class began in 2021, and is expected to sail for Manila by May 2022. It has finished conducting sea trials last February 2022.

== Ships in class ==
Hull number	Name	Builder	Launched	Delivered	Commissioned	Status
MRRV-9701	BRP Teresa Magbanua	Mitsubishi Shipbuilding Company Limited, Shimonoseki Shipyards	July 26, 2021	February 26, 2022	May 6, 2022	Active
MRRV-9702	BRP Melchora Aquino	Mitsubishi Shipbuilding Company Limited, Shimonoseki Shipyards	November 18, 2021	June 1, 2022	June 12, 2022	Active
MRRV-9703	TBC	Mitsubishi Shipbuilding Company Limited, Shimonoseki Shipyards	TBC	TBC	TBC	TBC
MRRV-9704	TBC	Mitsubishi Shipbuilding Company Limited, Shimonoseki Shipyards	TBC	TBC	TBC	TBC
MRRV-9705	TBC	Mitsubishi Shipbuilding Company Limited, Shimonoseki Shipyards	TBC	TBC	TBC	TBC
MRRV-9706	TBC	Mitsubishi Shipbuilding Company Limited, Shimonoseki Shipyards	TBC	TBC	TBC	TBC
MRRV-9707	TBC	Mitsubishi Shipbuilding Company Limited, Shimonoseki Shipyards	TBC	TBC	TBC	TBC
