= Iwami-class patrol vessel =

Class of patrol vessels

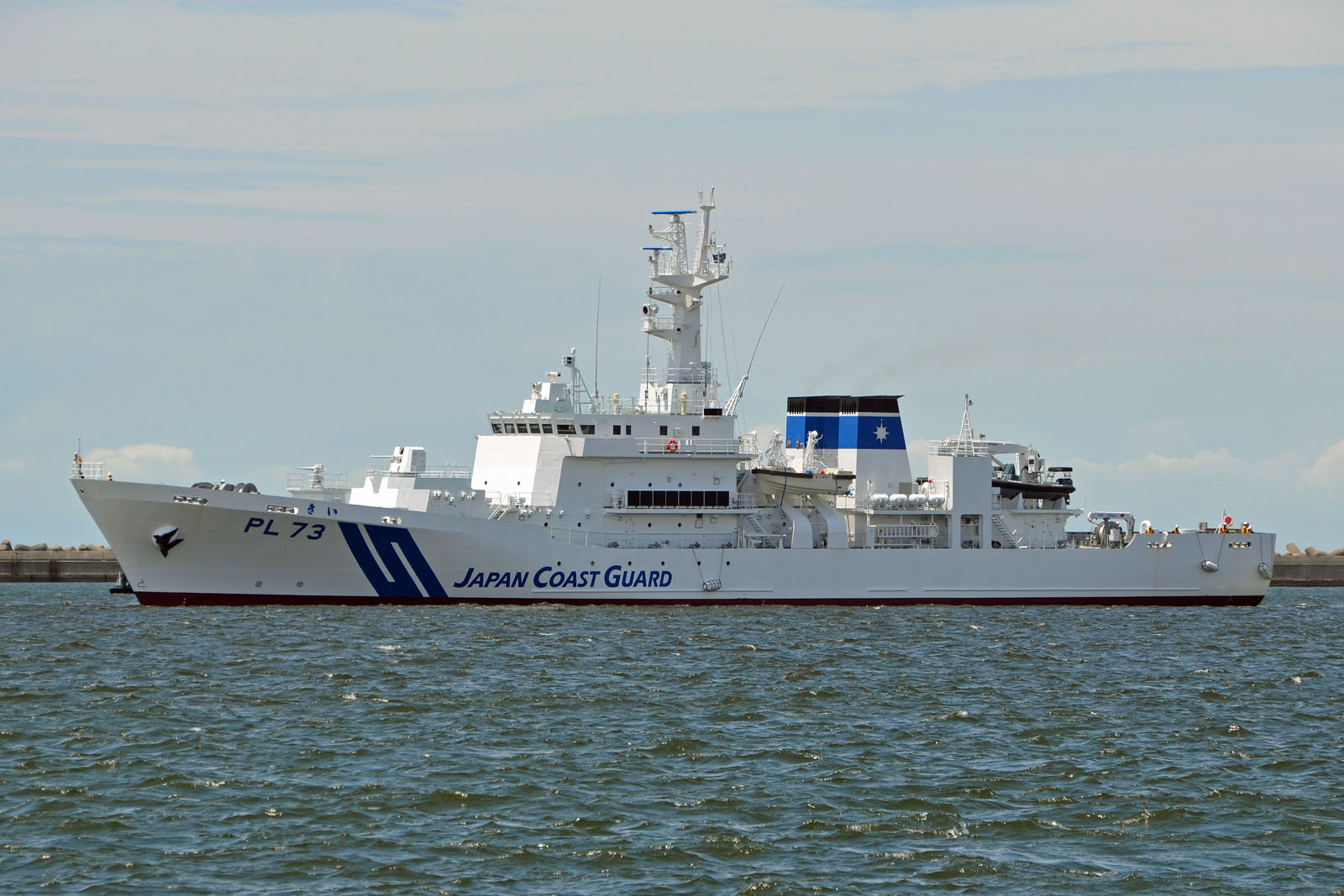

Class overview
- Name: Iwami-class patrol vessel
- Operators: Japan Coast Guard
- Preceded by: Kunigami class
- In commission: 2013–present
- Completed: 6
- Active: 6

General characteristics
- Type: PL (Patrol vessel Large)
- Tonnage: 1,250 GT
- Length: 92 m (301 ft 10 in)
- Beam: 11.0 m (36 ft 1 in)
- Draft: 5.0 m (16 ft 5 in)
- Propulsion: 2 × shafts; 2 × diesel engines, 8,000 hp (6,000 kW)
- Speed: 21 knots (39 km/h; 24 mph)
- Armament: 1 × Bushmaster II 30 mm gun

The Iwami-class patrol vessel (いわみ型巡視船, Iwami-gata-junnsi-senn) is a class of 1,000 ton-class PL type patrol vessels of the Japan Coast Guard (JCG).

== Backgrounds ==
In the 2000s, the JCG was building 1000-ton class PLs with a high speed planing hull, such as Aso and Hateruma classes. Although these ships were excellent in security missions, they were also unsuitable for rescue missions because of their poor low-speed stability and cruising capacity.

Since the mass retirement of the Shiretoko class was planned in the 2010s, general-purpose ships as replacements were needed. For this purpose, construction of the Kunigami class was started under the FY2009 supplement budget, but they were too expensive to build in large quantities.

Because their high cost, construction of this class was started under the FY2010 supplement budget as more reasonable but still versatile vessels.

== Design ==
Due to the demand for multi-mission capabilities, displacement hull made of steel was adopted as same as the Kunigami class. The superstructure is made of aluminium alloy. She is designed to assume the towing of a distress ship with a bollard pull of 45 tons, two funnels separated on the left and right ensure backward visibility. Because the aviation capability was not required, the helipad on the stern deck was omitted. Also no fin stabilizer was equipped, but antiroll tanks were retained since low-speed stability was required.

Based on the lesson learned from the operation of humanitarian response to the 2011 Tōhoku earthquake and tsunami, the last four ships strengthened the capacity of the fresh water generator, and additionally equipped with a water supply unit, a fuel supply unit, and a loading crane.

As a main weapon, a Bushmaster II 30 mm chain gun system with an optical director is installed.

== In service ==
The level of stability of this class was good, the automation was also proceeding, and it was a popular boat for the crew. However, this class was considered not to be so suitable for the security missions on the Senkaku Islands, and the Kunigami class began construction again in FY2012. This additional construction reduced costs, therefore construction of Kunigami class is continuing from FY 2013 onwards.

== Ships in the class ==
Pennant no.	Name	Builder	Commissioned	Homeport
PL-71	Iwami	Shimonoseki shipyard, Mitsubishi Heavy Industries	September 27, 2013	Hamada
PL-72	Rebun	Shimonoseki shipyard, Mitsubishi Heavy Industries	January 30, 2014	Muroran
PL-73	Kii	Tamano Shipyard, Mitsui Engineering & Shipbuilding	July 31, 2014	Wakayama
PL-74	Matsushima	Tamano Shipyard, Mitsui Engineering & Shipbuilding	September 30, 2014	Shiogama
PL-75	Wakasa	Tamano Shipyard, Mitsui Engineering & Shipbuilding	February 26, 2015	Maizuru
PL-76	Sado	Tamano Shipyard, Mitsui Engineering & Shipbuilding	February 26, 2015	Niigata

== See also ==
- List of Japan Coast Guard vessels and aircraft
