= List of Japan Coast Guard vessels and aircraft =

List of Japan Coast Guard vessels and aircraft.

== Fleet ==
=== PLH (Patrol Vessel Large With Helicopter) ===
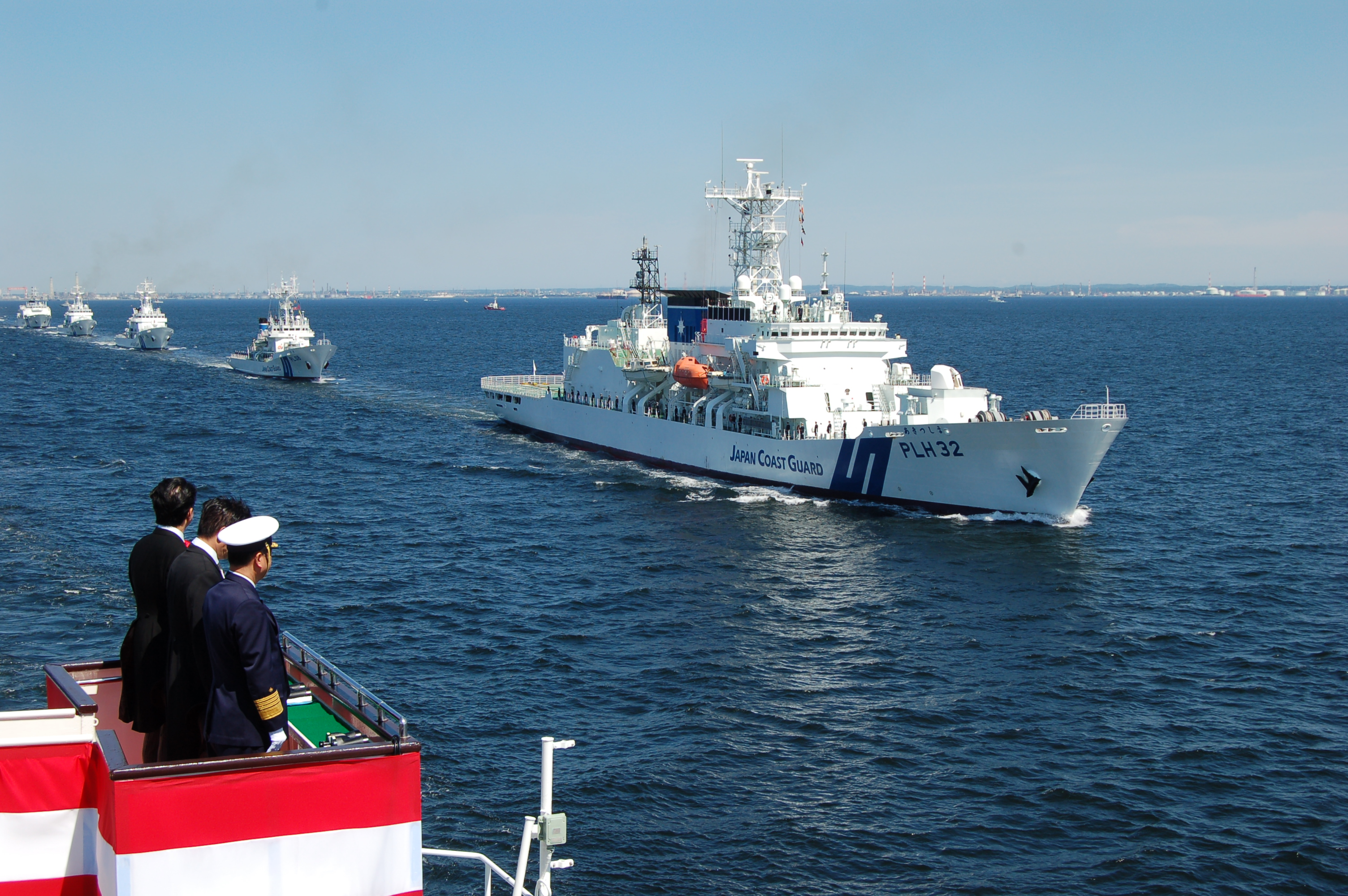
JCG Akitsushima (PLH-32) in the van during the 2018 fleet review

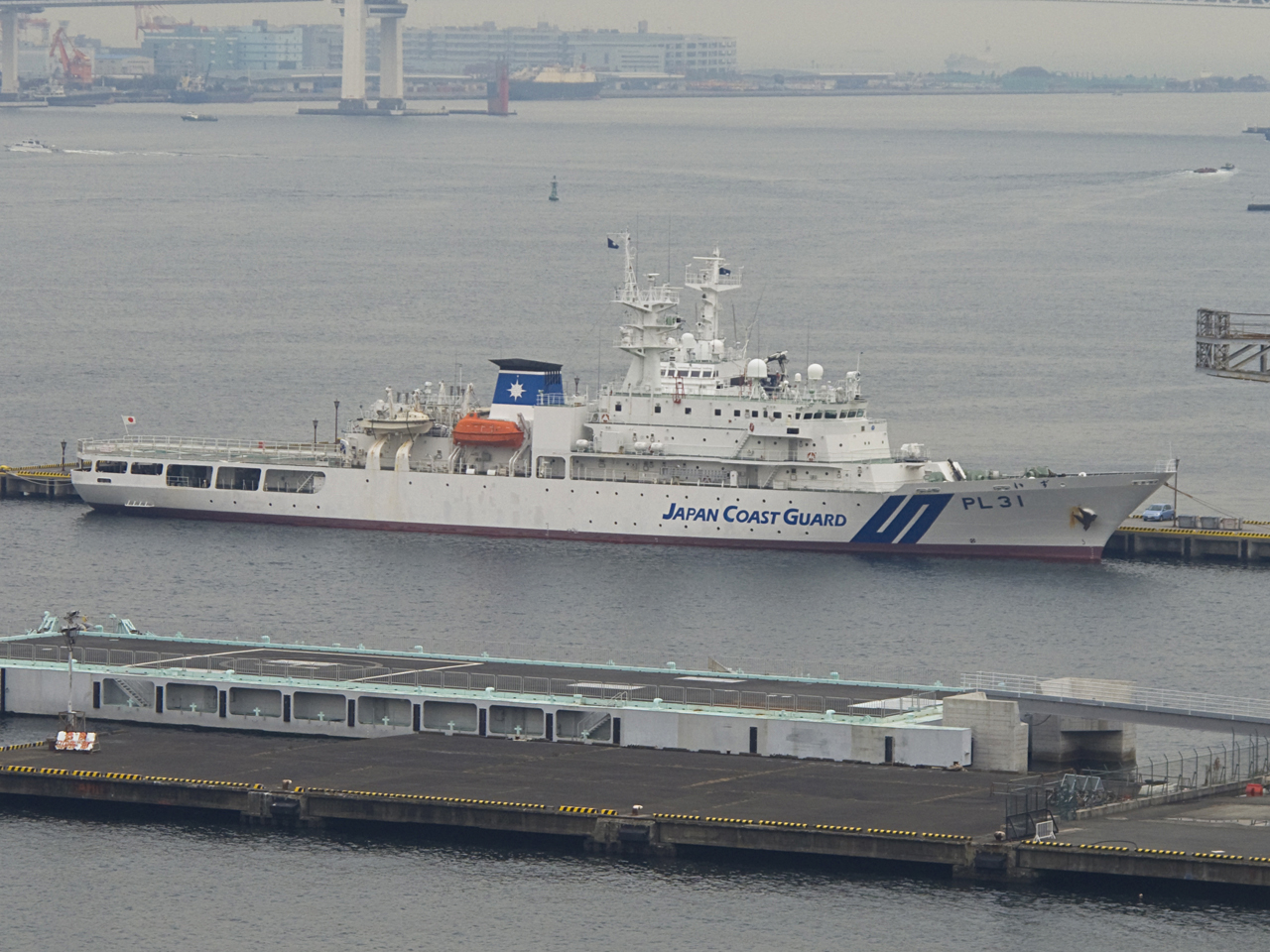
Shikishima (PLH 31) berthed in Yokohama harbour

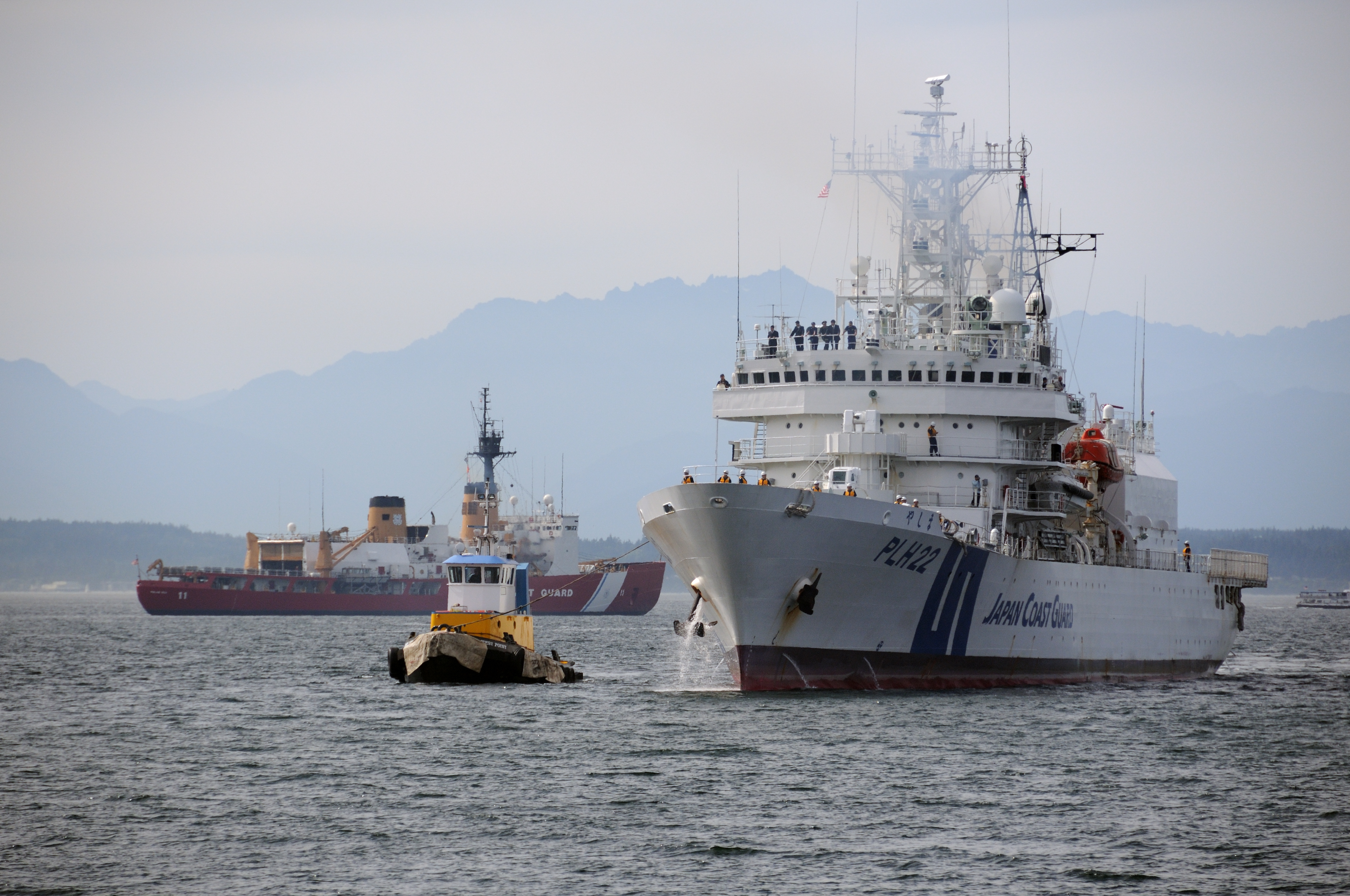
JCG Yashima (PLH 22) with USCGC Polar Sea (WAGB-11) in Seattle

- 2 Helicopter class
  - Shunkō class (ja)
  - Shikishima class
  - Mizuho class
- 1 Helicopter class
  - Reimei class (Modified Shikishima class)
  - Tsugaru class
    - Ryūkyū class (Modified Tsugaru class)
  - Soya class

=== PL (Patrol Vessel Large) ===
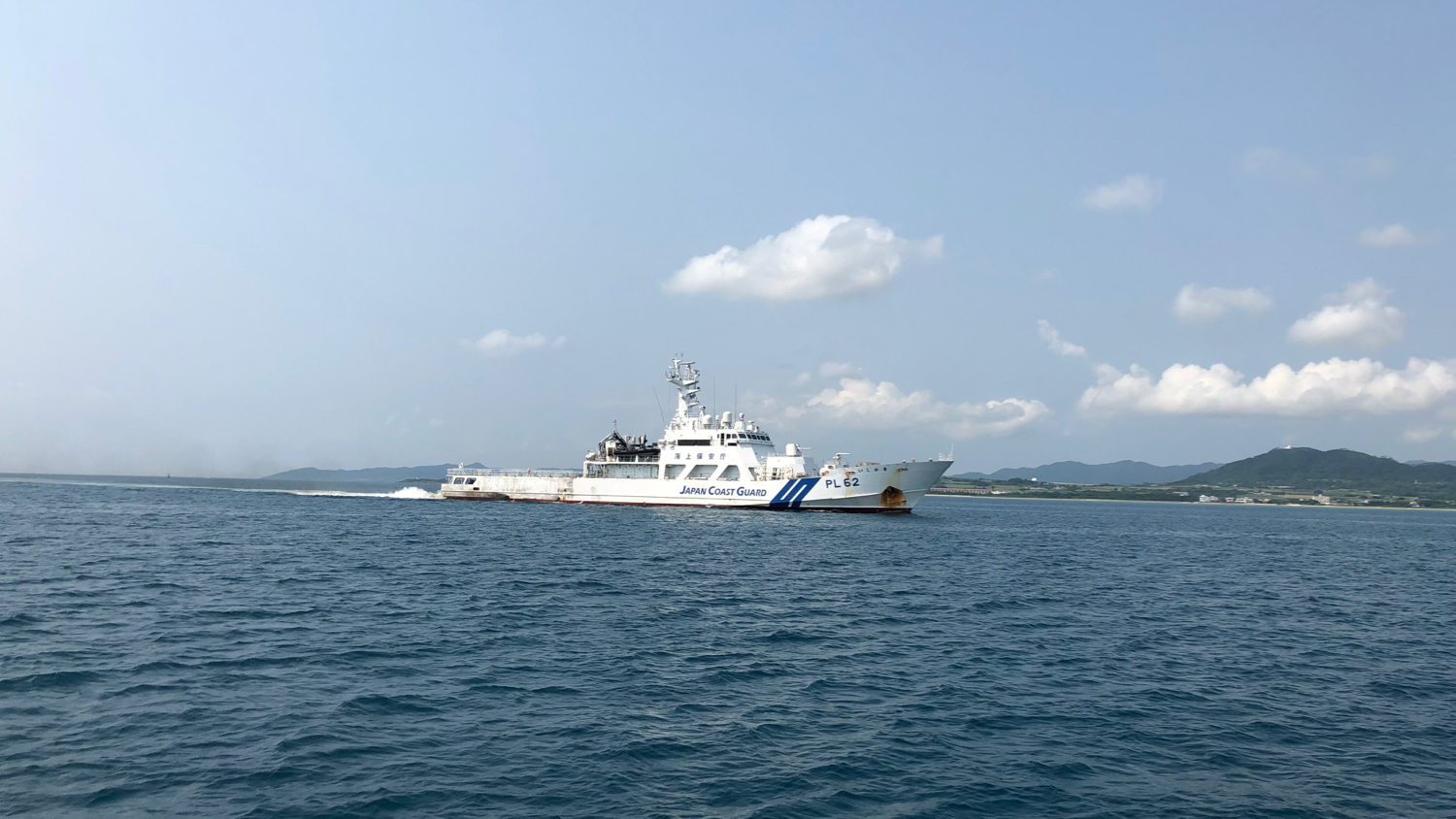
JCG Ishigaki (PL62) patrolling the Yaeyama Islands

- 3500 t class
  - Miyako class (ja)
  - Izu class (ja)
- 2000 t class
  - Hida class
- 1000 t class
  - Kunigami class (Kunisaki class)
  - Iwami class
  - Hateruma class
  - Aso class
  - Nojima class (Oki, ex Nojima (PL-01), transferred to Malaysia Maritime Enforcement Agency as KM Arau)
  - Ojika class (modified Nojima class) (PL-02 transferred to Malaysia Maritime Enforcement Agency as KM Pekan)
  - Shiretoko class

==== Training role ====
- 3000 t class
  - Kojima (3rd) (ja)
  - Miura
  - Okoyama
- 1100 t class
  - Kojima (2nd) (ja)

=== PM (Patrol Vessel Medium) ===
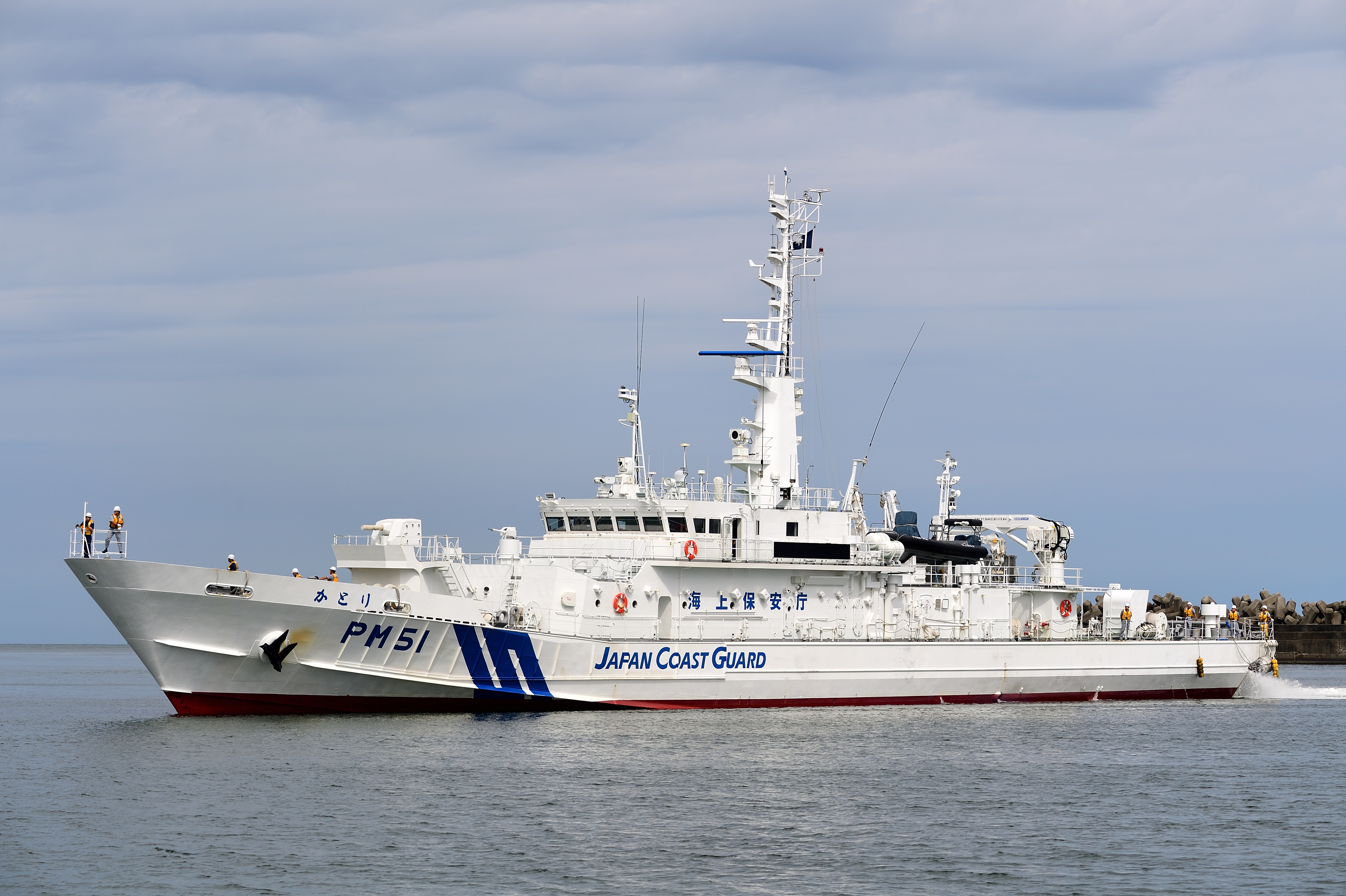
JGC Katori (PM51) sailing off Chiba

- 500 t class
  - Katori class (ja)
  - Teshio (PM 15) (ja)
  - Teshio class (Natsui class)
- 350 t class
  - Tokara class
  - Amami class
  - Takatori class

=== PS (Patrol Vessel Small) ===
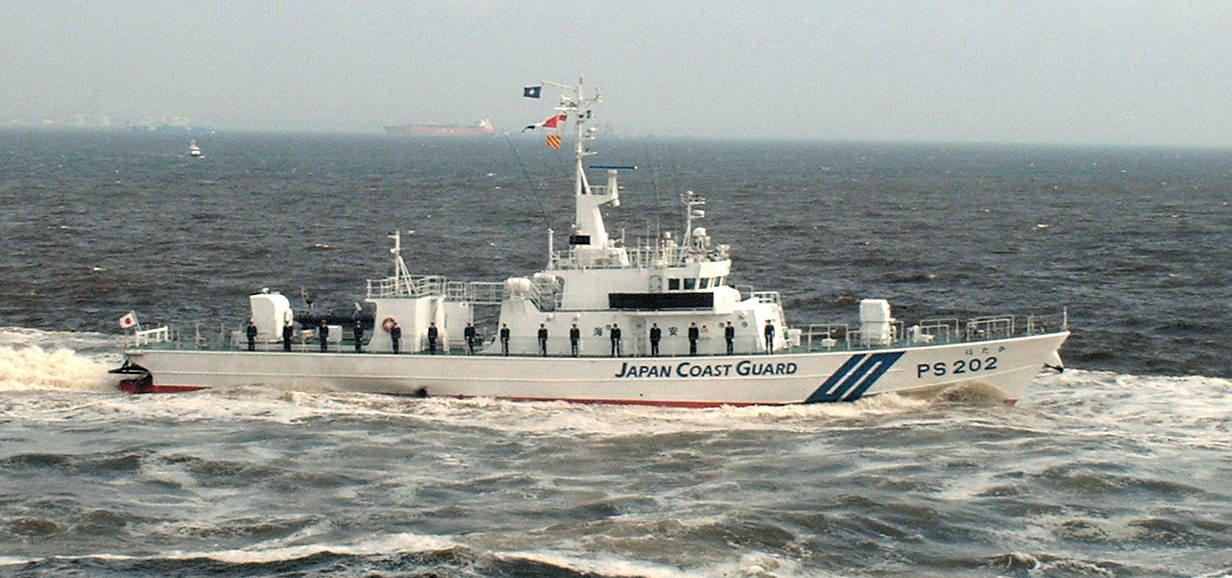
JGC Hotaka (PS 202) in the Sea of Japan

- 220 t class
  - Tsurugi class
- 180 t class
  - Bizan class (Raizan class)
  - Mihashi class (Shinzan class)
  - Shimoji class
- 130 t class
  - Takatsuki class (ja)

=== PC (Patrol Craft) ===
- 35 m class
  - Yodo class (ja)
  - Hamagumo class
  - Matsunami
  - Hayanami class
- 30 m class
  - Kagayuki class (Hayagumo class)
  - Asogiri class
  - Murakumo class
- 23 m class

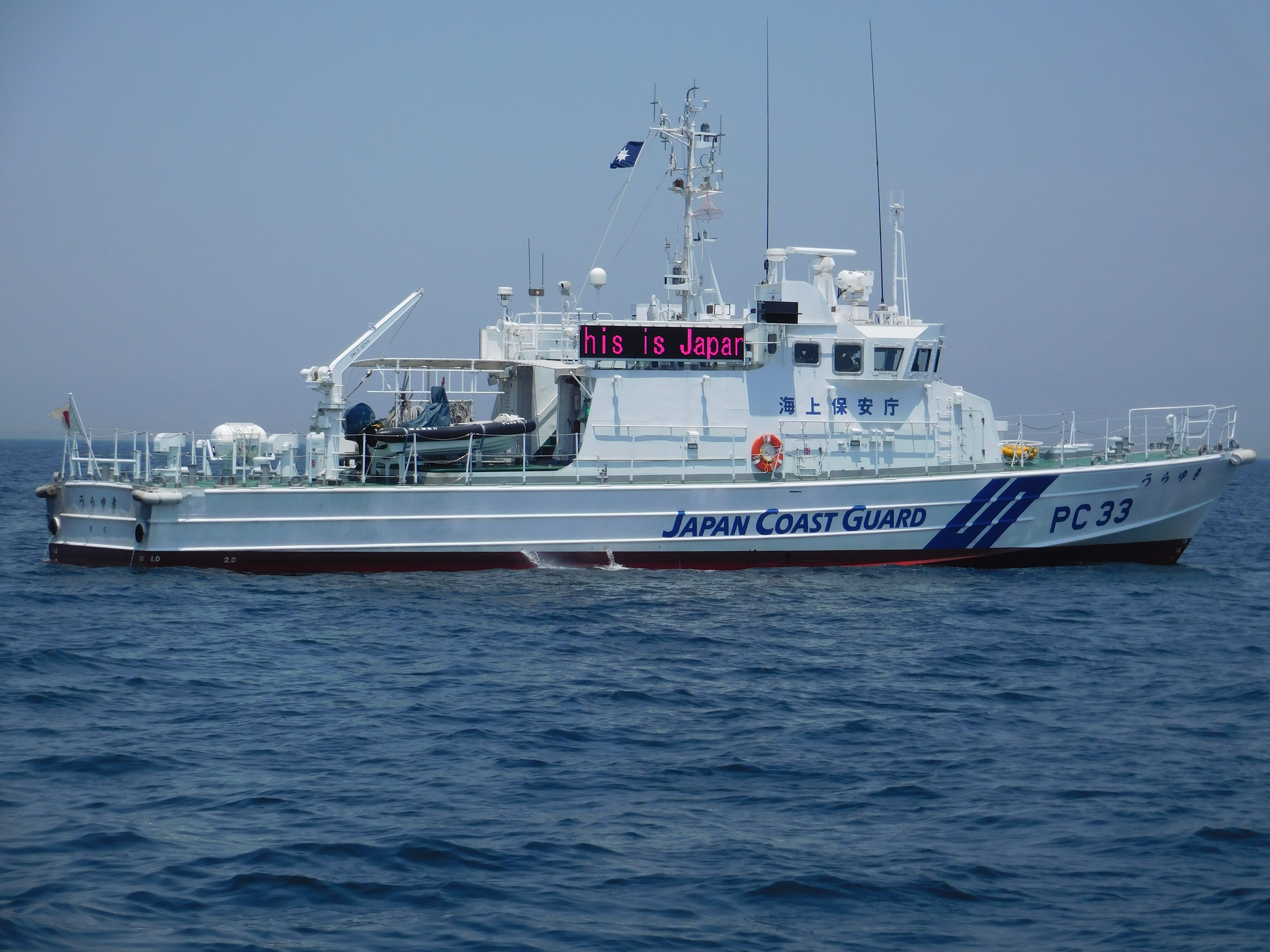
JGC Urayuki (PC 33) demonstrating her LED message panel

  - Kotonami class (ja)
  - Natsugiri class
  - Shimagiri class
  - Akizuki class

=== CL (Craft Large) ===
- 20 m class
  - Suzukaze class (ja) (Himegiku class)
  - Hayagiku class
  - Shiraume class
- 15 m class
  - Nadakaze class
  - Isokaze class

=== FL (Fire fighting boat Large) ===
- Hiryū class (2nd) (ja)
- Hiryū class (1st)

=== FM (Fire fighting boat Medium) ===
- Nunobiki class

=== GS (Guard Boat Small) ===
- Sagittarius class (Hayate class 2nd)
- Hayate class

=== SS (Surveillance Service Small) ===
- Lynx class
- Polaris class
- Orion class (2nd)
- Southern Cross class (Polaris class)
- Orion class (1st)

=== MS (Monitoring Boat Small) ===
- Katsuren
- Saikai
- Kinugasa

=== HL (Hydrographic Survey Vessel Large) ===
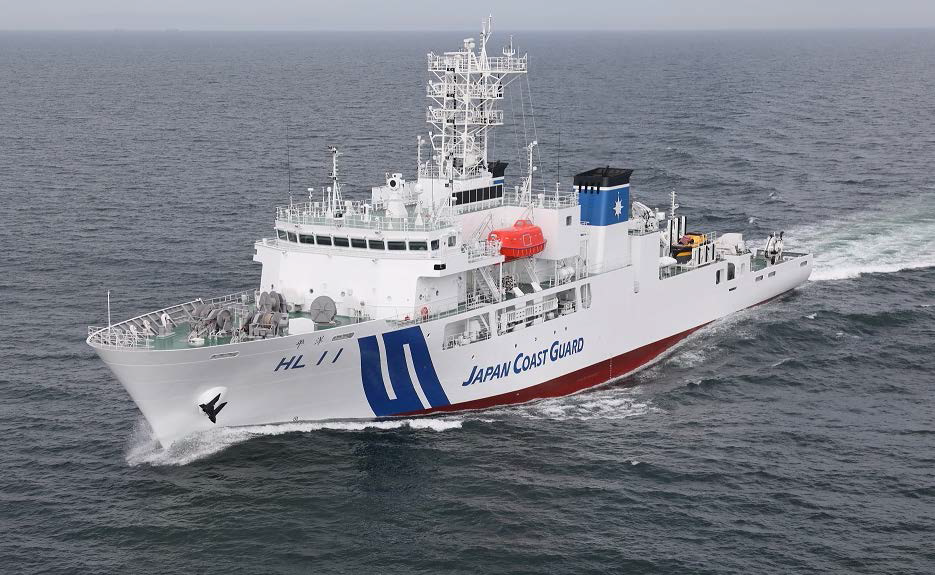
JCG Heiyō (HL 11) hydrographic survey ship

- Heiyō class (2nd) (ja)
- Shōyō (2nd)
- Meiyō class (2nd)
- Tenyō (2nd)
- Takuyō (2nd)
- Shōyō (1st)
- Meiyō (1st)
- Takuyō (1st)

=== HM (Hydrographic Survey Vessel Medium) ===
- Kaiyō (1st)
- Tenyō (1st)
- Heiyō (1st)

=== HS (Hydrographic Survey Vessel Small) ===
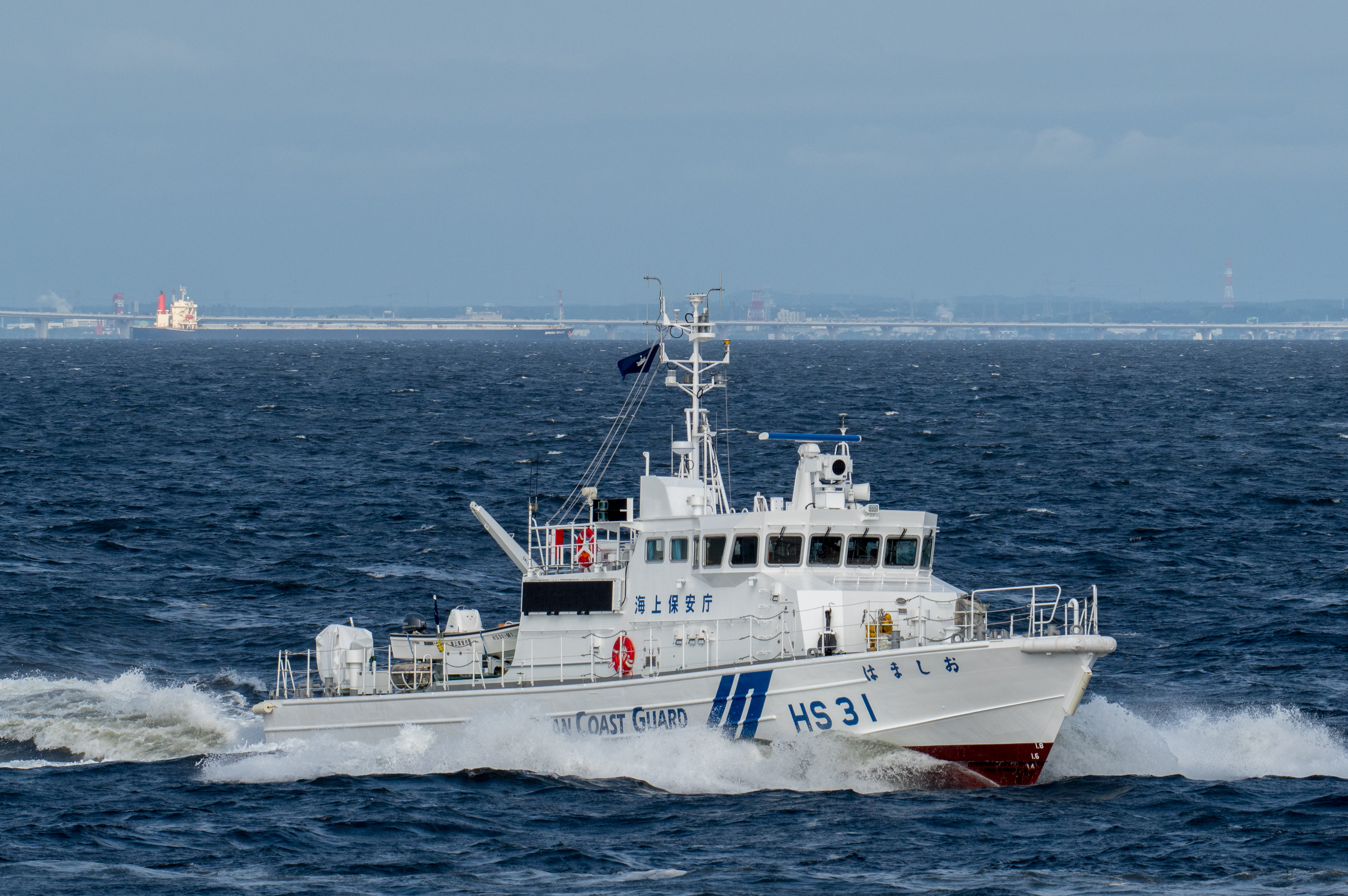
JCG Hamashio (HS 31) in Tokyo Bay

- Hamashio class (3rd) (ja)
- Jinbei
- Hamashio class (2nd)
- Akashi class
- Hamashio class (1st)
- Takashima class
- Isogo class
- Hashima class
- Akashio class

=== LM (Light-House Service Vessel Medium) ===
- Hakuun class

=== LS (Light-House Service Vessel Small) ===
- Akihikari class
- Hatsuhikari class

=== TV (Training Vessel) ===
- CI class
- Aoba class

== Aircraft inventory ==
Aircraft	Origin	Type	Versions	In service	Notes
Beechcraft Super King Air	United States	Patrol Transport	King Air 200T King Air 350	1 9	
Bombardier Dash 8	Canada	Maritime surveillance	DHC-8-315	8	One Bombardier Dash 8 was lost during a collision at Haneda Airport, Tokyo on 2 January 2024
Cessna 206 Stationair	United States	Utility	U206G	1	
Dassault Falcon 900	France	Maritime surveillance, search and rescue		2	
Gulfstream V	United States	VIP transport		2	
Saab 340	Sweden	Transport	SF 340B	4	
AgustaWestland AW139	Italy	SAR	AW139	14	10 ordered
Bell 206 JetRanger	United States	Utility helicopter	206B	3	
Bell 212 Twin Huey	United States	Transport helicopter		16	
Bell 412	United States	Transport helicopter		5	
Bell 505	United States	Utility helicopter	505	4	
Eurocopter Super Puma	France	SAR	AS 332L1	2	
Eurocopter EC225/Airbus Helicopters H225	France	SAR	EC 225/H225	11	
Sikorsky S-76	United States	SAR	S-76C S-76D	3 0	11 ordered
General Atomics MQ-9B SeaGuardian	United States	Maritime surveillance	MQ-9B	TBA	Operation start in October 2022
