= Tsurugi-class patrol vessel =

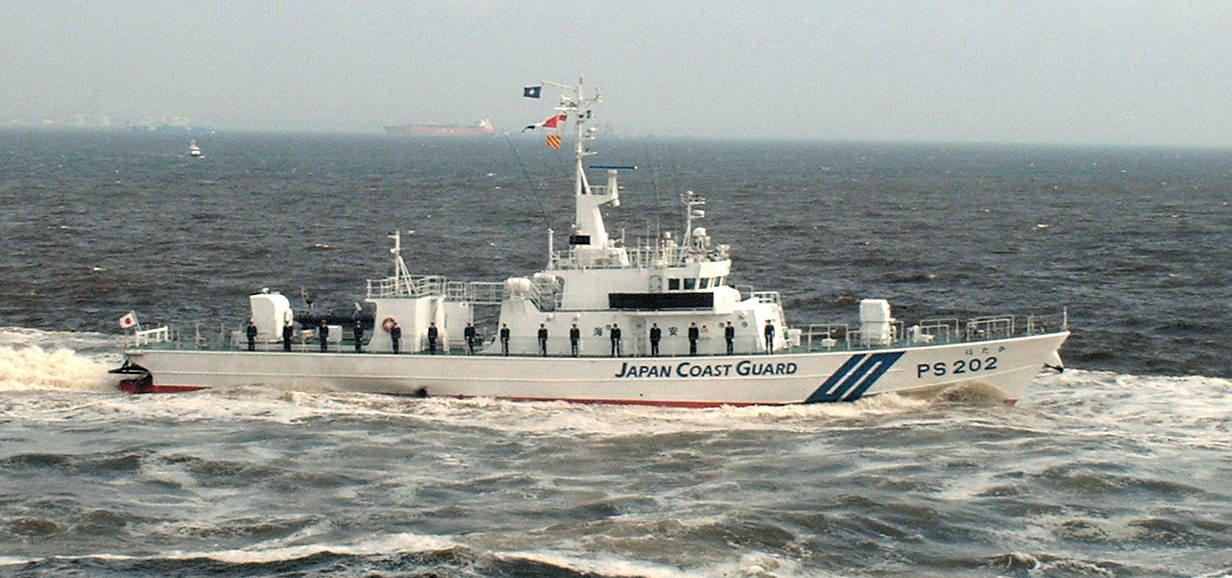
- Hotaka (PS-202)

Class overview
- Name: Tsurugi class
- Builders: Hitachi Zosen Corporation, Mitsubishi Heavy Industries, Mitsui Engineering & Shipbuilding
- Operators: Japan Coast Guard
- Built: 2000–2005
- In commission: 2001–present
- Planned: 15
- Completed: 6
- Canceled: 9
- Active: 6

General characteristics
- Type: Patrol vessels, small (PS)
- Tonnage: 220 GT
- Length: 50.0 m (164 ft 1 in)
- Beam: 8.0 m (26 ft 3 in)
- Depth: 4 m (13 ft 1 in)
- Propulsion: 3 × Waterjets; 3 × diesel engines
- Speed: 50+ knots
- Armament: 1 × JM61 20 mm gun with RFS

The Tsurugi class (Japanese: つるぎ型巡視船) is a class of small patrol vessel of the Japan Coast Guard (JCG). The development of this class was one of the earliest attempts of the JCG to deal with spy boats from North Korea. In March 1999, the JCG tried to intercept vessels of unknown nationality suspected to be North Korean, but the unknown vessels were too fast, and the Japan Maritime Self-Defense Force had to be called to intercept the unknown vessels. As a consequence of this failure, JCG realized their need for high speed interceptors.

The Tsurugi class is referred to as High-speed, special-purpose patrol vessels (高速特殊警備船, Koutoku-sen). Planned as the top-tier of JCG intercept spy boats, this class features very high speed and accurate firepower. Its weaponry includes a JM61 20 mm Gatling gun, and a Remote Firing System consisting of a remote weapon system with a laser-optical fire-control system.

In the Battle of Amami-Ōshima, the combination of the 20 mm gun with the RFS proved its worth, but it became clear that its effective range was insufficient against weapons on board the North Korean spy boats such as 9K38 Igla MANPADS and B-10 recoilless rifle. In response, the JCG intends to organize mobile flotillas combining Tsurugi-class ships with vessels of the Hida and Aso classes, which have Bofors 40 mm L/70 autocannons.

== Ships in the class ==
Ships in the class
Pennant number	Ship name	Builder	Commission	Homeport
PS201	Tsurugi	Hitachi Zosen Corporation	15 February 2001	Sakata
PS202	Hotaka	Mitsubishi Heavy Industries	16 March 2001	Maizuru
PS203	Norikura	Mitsui Engineering & Shipbuilding	16 March 2001	Kanazawa
PS204	Kaimon	Mitsui Engineering & Shipbuilding	21 April 2004	Naze
PS205	Asama	Mitsui Engineering & Shipbuilding	21 April 2004	Hamada
PS206	Houou	Mitsui Engineering & Shipbuilding	17 January 2005	Nagasaki

== See also ==
- List of Japan Coast Guard vessels and aircraft

== Future reading ==
- "Ships of Japan Coast Guard". Ships of the World (in Japanese) (692). Kaijinn-sha: 51. July 2008.
- Shigehiro Sakamoto (July 2008). "60th Anniversary of JCG: For near future". Ships of the World (in Japanese) (692). Kaijinn-sha: 132–137.
- Yoshifumi Mayama (July 2008). "60th Anniversary of JCG: Technical history of its ship". Ships of the World (in Japanese) (692). Kaijinn-sha: 138–143.
