= Kunigami-class patrol vessel =

Japanese Coast Guard ship

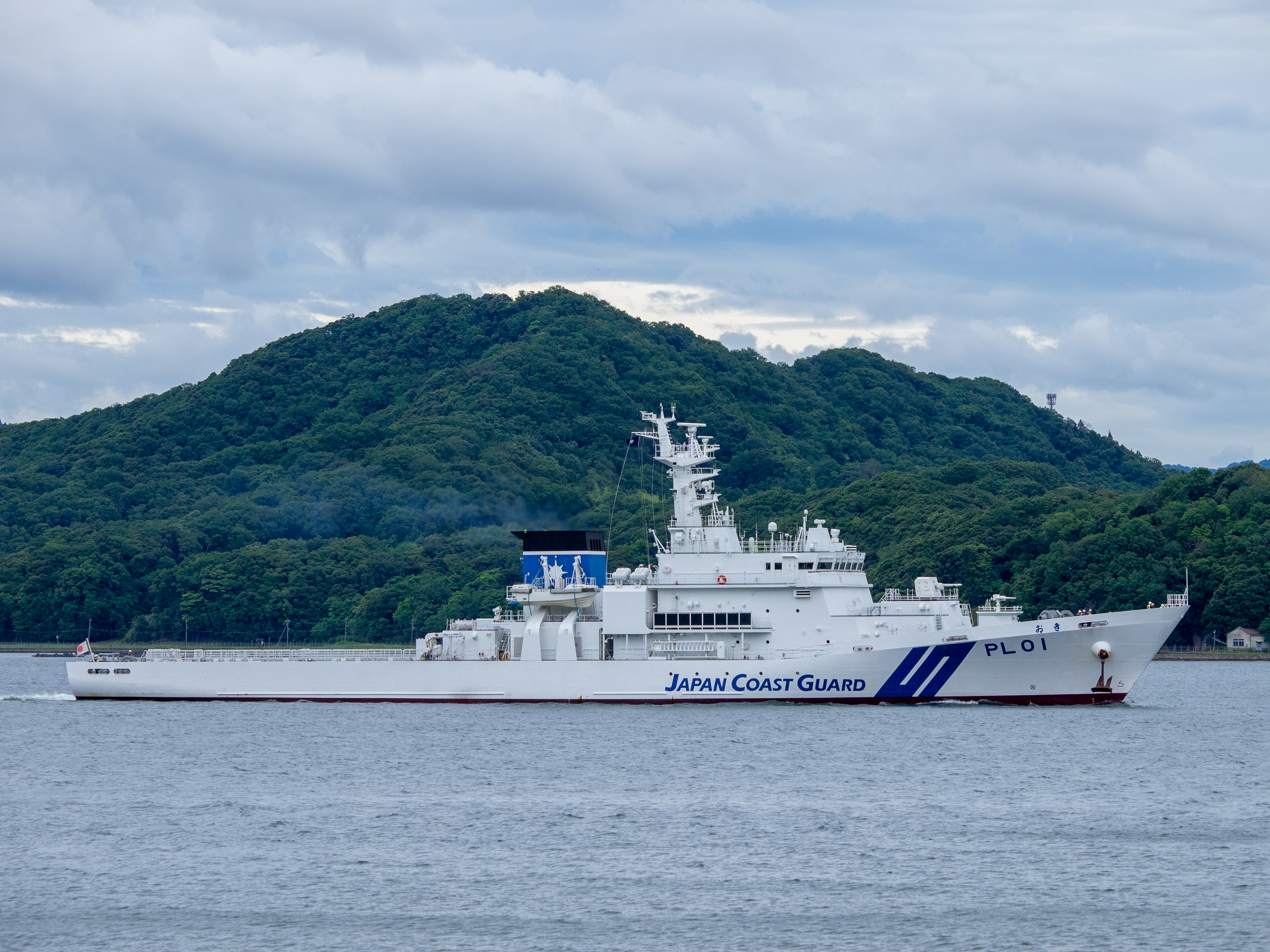
- PL-01 Oki

Class overview
- Name: Kunigami-class patrol vessel
- Operators: Japan Coast Guard
- Preceded by: Hateruma class
- Succeeded by: Iwami class
- Subclasses: Teresa Magbanua class
- In commission: 2012–present
- Planned: 21
- Building: 1
- Completed: 20
- Active: 20

General characteristics
- Type: PL (Patrol vessel Large)
- Tonnage: 1,700 GT
- Length: 96.6 m (316 ft 11 in)
- Beam: 11.5 m (37 ft 9 in)
- Draft: 5.2 m (17 ft 1 in)
- Propulsion: 2 × shafts; 2 × diesel engines
- Speed: 25 knots (46 km/h; 29 mph)
- Armament: 1 × JM61 20mm gun (FY2009 & FY2012) earlier ships; 1 × Bushmaster II 30mm gun (FY2013) later ships
- Armor: bulletproofing structure at the bridge

The Kunigami-class patrol vessel (くにがみ型巡視船, Kunigami-gata-junnsi-senn) is a class of 1,000 ton-class PL type patrol vessels of the Japan Coast Guard (JCG).

== Background ==
In the 2000s, the JCG was building 1,000-ton class PLs with a high speed planing hull, such as Aso and Hateruma classes. Although these ships were excellent in security missions, they were also unsuitable for rescue missions because of their poor low-speed stability and cruising capacity.

Since the mass retirement of the Shiretoko class was planned in the 2010s, general-purpose ships as replacements were needed. For this purpose, construction of this class was started under the FY2009 supplement budget.

As a result of emphasis on versatility, the price soared, only two ships were built, more reasonable Iwami class was built from the following fiscal year. However, after that, additional construction was done to deploy on the Senkaku Islands in the FY2012 budgets. And construction is continuing from FY 2013 onwards, as construction costs have been reduced due to the mass production effect of this large-scale construction.

== Design ==
Due to the demand for multi-mission capabilities, displacement hull made of steel was adopted. Also, since low-speed stability was required, antiroll tanks was also installed in addition to fin stabilizers. The superstructure is made of aluminium alloy, but the bridge has bulletproofing structure introduced.

A helipad is set on the stern deck. Although there is no hangar, they can supply fuel and electric power to a helicopter on board.

As a main weapon, a JM61-RFS 20 mm rotary gun system with an optical director was installed on the early ships built under the FY2009 and FY2012. And more powerful Bushmaster II 30 mm chain gun system was installed on the late ships built under the FY2013 and following fiscal years.

A variant made for the Philippines is known as the Teresa Magbanua-class patrol vessel.

== In service ==
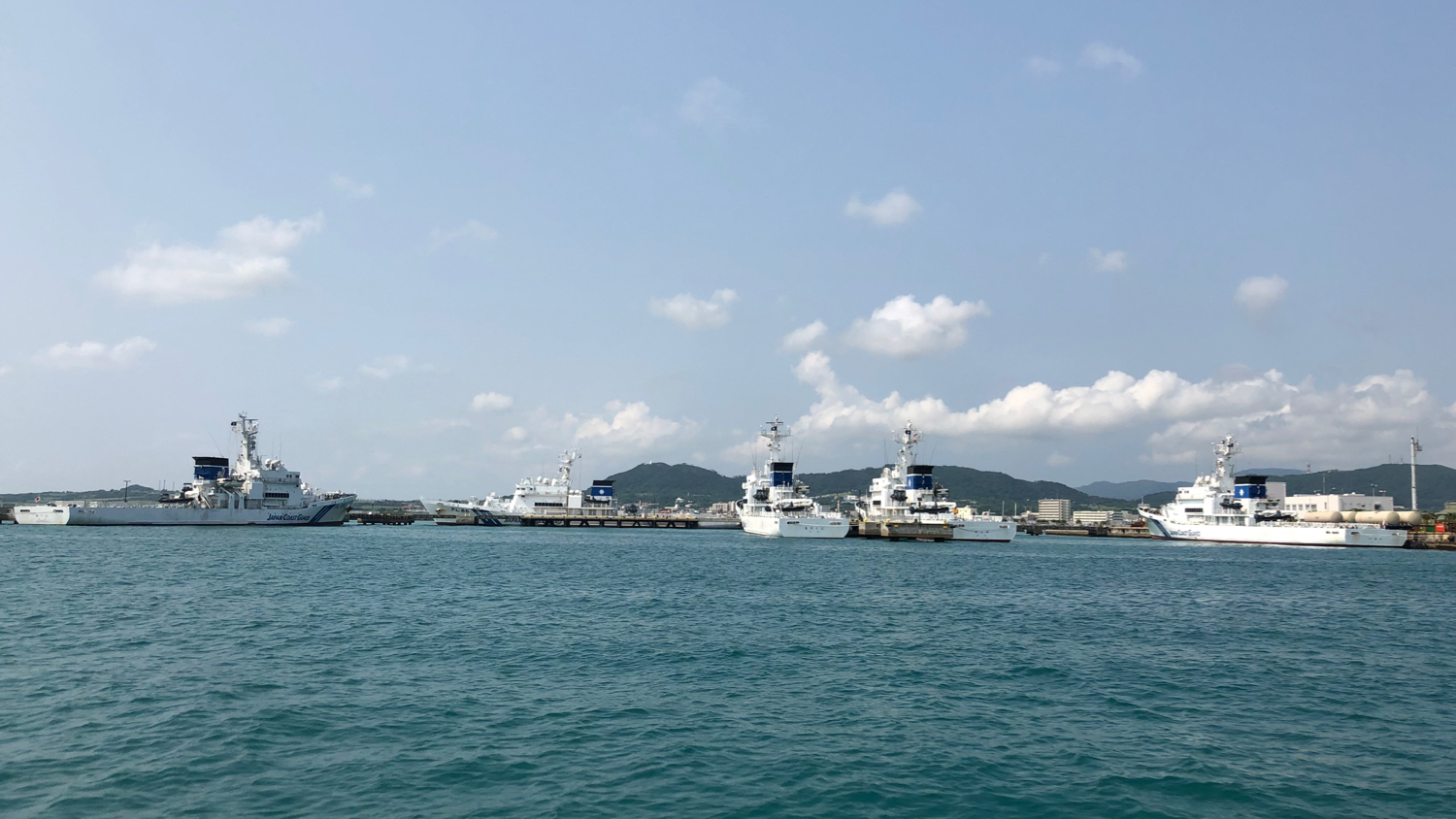
JCG Kunigami class ships based at Ishigaki

The 10 Kunigami class ships leading JCG's increased focus on grey-zone challenges along with 2 Hateruma-class patrol vessels has made the base at Ishigaki JCG's largest base, surpassing Yokohama. The ships of FY2012 constitutes the main force of the task force deployed around the Senkaku Islands. And the ships built under the FY2013 and following fiscal years were deployed as replacements of the Shiretoko class.

== Ships in the class ==
Pennant no.	Name	Builder	Commissioned	Homeport
PL-09	Kunisaki (former Kunigami)	Shimonoseki shipyard, Mitsubishi Heavy Industries	April 27, 2012	Moji
PL-10	Bukō (former Motobu)	Shimonoseki shipyard, Mitsubishi Heavy Industries	April 27, 2012	Yokohama
PL-81	Taketomi	Shimonoseki shipyard, Mitsubishi Heavy Industries	September 26, 2014	Ishigaki
PL-82	Nagura	Shimonoseki shipyard, Mitsubishi Heavy Industries	September 26, 2014	Ishigaki
PL-83	Kabira	Shimonoseki shipyard, Mitsubishi Heavy Industries	November 7, 2014	Ishigaki
PL-84	Zampa	Shimonoseki shipyard, Mitsubishi Heavy Industries	February 25, 2015	Ishigaki
PL-85	Tarama	Isogo shipyard, Japan Marine United	November 25, 2015	Ishigaki
PL-86	Ikema	Isogo shipyard, Japan Marine United	November 25, 2015	Ishigaki
PL-87	Irabu	Tamano Shipyard, Mitsui Engineering & Shipbuilding	November 25, 2015	Ishigaki
PL-88	Tokashiki	Shimonoseki shipyard, Mitsubishi Heavy Industries	February 4, 2016	Ishigaki
PL-89	Aguni	Tamano Shipyard, Mitsui Engineering & Shipbuilding	February 24, 2016	Ishigaki
PL-90	Izena	Shimonoseki shipyard, Mitsubishi Heavy Industries	February 24, 2016	Ishigaki
PL-11	Rishiri	Shimonoseki shipyard, Mitsubishi Heavy Industries	October 27, 2016	Wakkanai
PL-12	Esan	Shimonoseki shipyard, Mitsubishi Heavy Industries	October 27, 2016	Otaru
PL-13	Motobu	Isogo shipyard, Japan Marine United	November 29, 2016	Naha
PL-14	Yonakuni	Tamano Shipyard, Mitsui Engineering & Shipbuilding	November 25, 2016	Ishigaki
PL-01	Oki	Shimonoseki shipyard, Mitsubishi Heavy Industries	February 27, 2017	Sakaiminato
PL-02	Erimo	Shimonoseki shipyard, Mitsubishi Heavy Industries	February 27, 2017	Kushiro
PL-91	Tsuruga	Isogo shipyard, Japan Marine United	May 15, 2020	Tsuruga
PL-92	Echizen	Tamano Shipyard, Mitsui E&S	July 30, 2020	Tsuruga

== See also ==
- List of Japan Coast Guard vessels and aircraft
