= Ojika-class patrol vessel =

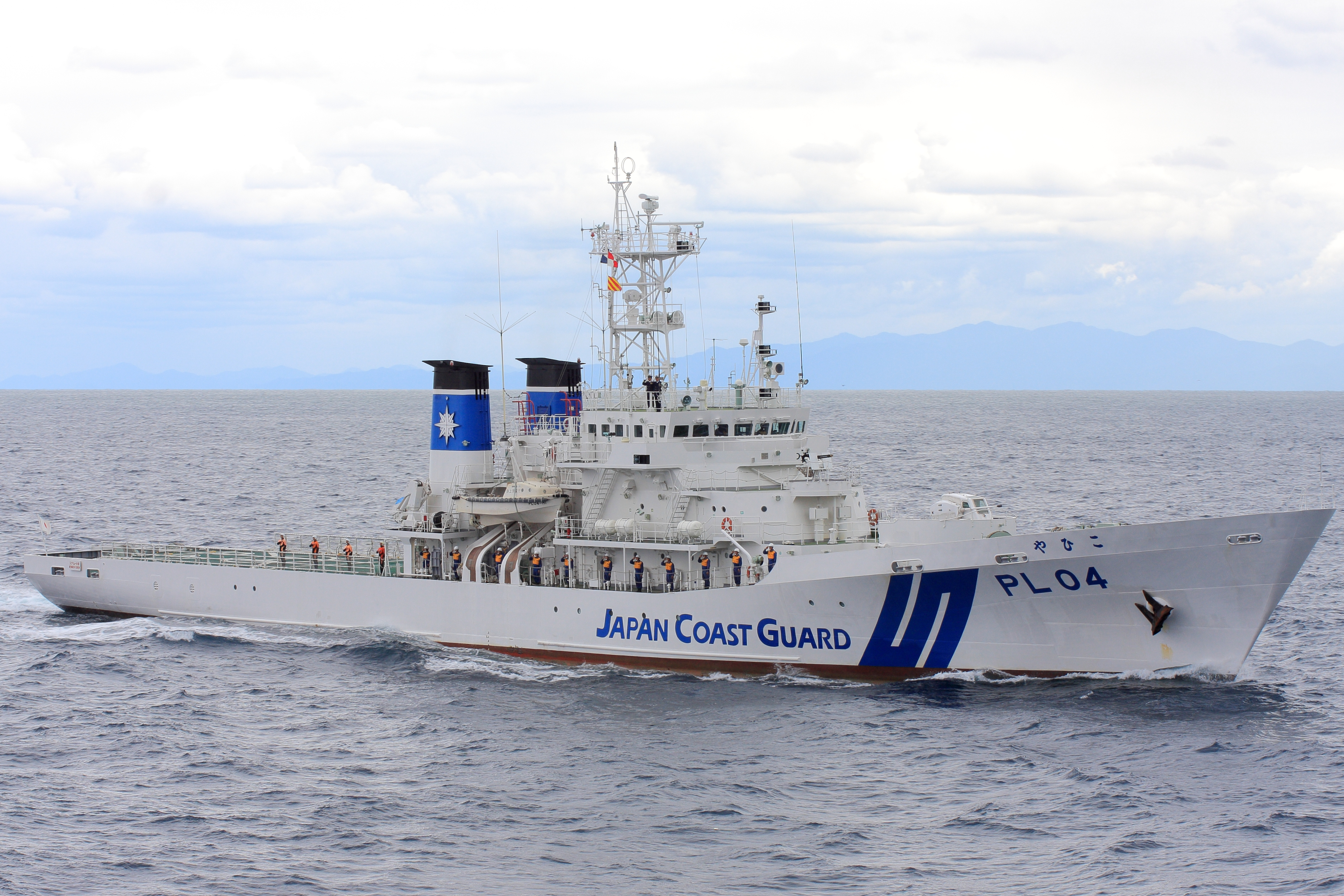
- Yahiko (PL-04)

Class overview
- Name: Ojika-class patrol vessel
- Operators: Japan Coast Guard; Malaysian Maritime Enforcement Agency
- Preceded by: Nojima
- Succeeded by: Aso class
- Built: 1990–2000
- In commission: 1991–
- Completed: 7
- Active: 7
- Retired: 1 (in Japanese service)

General characteristics
- Type: 1,000 ton-class PL (Note: The hull classification symbol "PL" stands for "Patrol Vessel, Large".)
- Tonnage: 1,269 GT
- Displacement: normal: 1,883 tons; full load: 2,006 tons
- Length: 91.5 m (300 ft 2 in)
- Beam: 11.0 m (36 ft 1 in)
- Draught: 3.5 m (11 ft 6 in)
- Depth: 6.4 m (21 ft 0 in)
- Propulsion: 2 × shafts; 2 × diesel engines; (7,000 ps/5,148kW)
- Speed: 20.0 knots (37.0 km/h; 23.0 mph)
- Range: 3,000 nmi (5,600 km; 3,500 mi)
- Boats & landing craft carried: 2 × 7-meter type high-speed launch; 2 × rigid inflatable boats
- Complement: 34
- Sensors & processing systems: JMA-1596 navigation radar
- Armament: 1 × KDC 35 mm gun; 1 × JM61-M 20 mm gun

The Ojika-class patrol vessel is a class of PL type patrol vessels of the Japan Coast Guard.

== Design ==
The design of this class is generally a modified version of Nojima (PL-01), a preceding 1,000-ton class PL being emphasis on air-sea rescue operations.

In contrast to the Nojima, which had a helicopter deck one level higher than the strength deck, this class utilizes the end of the strength deck as the helicopter deck, and has a reinforced structure to land a large Super Puma helicopter. In addition, a well dock was installed below the helicopter deck to accommodate a high speed launch, but it was not efficient as planned and discontinued after the second ship.

The chimney was split into two and placed on both sides of the ship. Between these funnels, a hangar for the ROV and a preparation room for diving operations were set up. With these capabilities to support divers, all ships of this class are officially certified as Patrol Vessel with Enhanced Rescue Capability (救難強化巡視船, Kyūnan-kyōka-junshisen).

== Ships in the class ==
Hull no.	Ship name	Builder	Commission	Decommission	Fate
PL-02	Erimo (former Ojika)	Mitsui Engineering & Shipbuilding	31 October 1991	24 January 2017	Transferred to Malaysian Coast Guard as KM Pekan
PL-03	Kudaka	Hakodate Dock	25 October 1994		
PL-04	Yahiko (former Satsuma)	Sumitomo Heavy Industries	26 October 1995		
PL-05	Dejima (former Hakata)	Ishikawajima-Harima Heavy Industries	26 November 1998		
PL-06	Kurikoma (former Dejima)	Mitsui Engineering & Shipbuilding	29 October 1999		
PL-07	Satsuma	Kawasaki Heavy Industries	29 October 1999		
PL-08	Tosa (former Motobu)	Sasebo Heavy Industries [ja]	31 October 2000		
