= Hida-class patrol vessel =

Japan Coast Guard patrol vessel

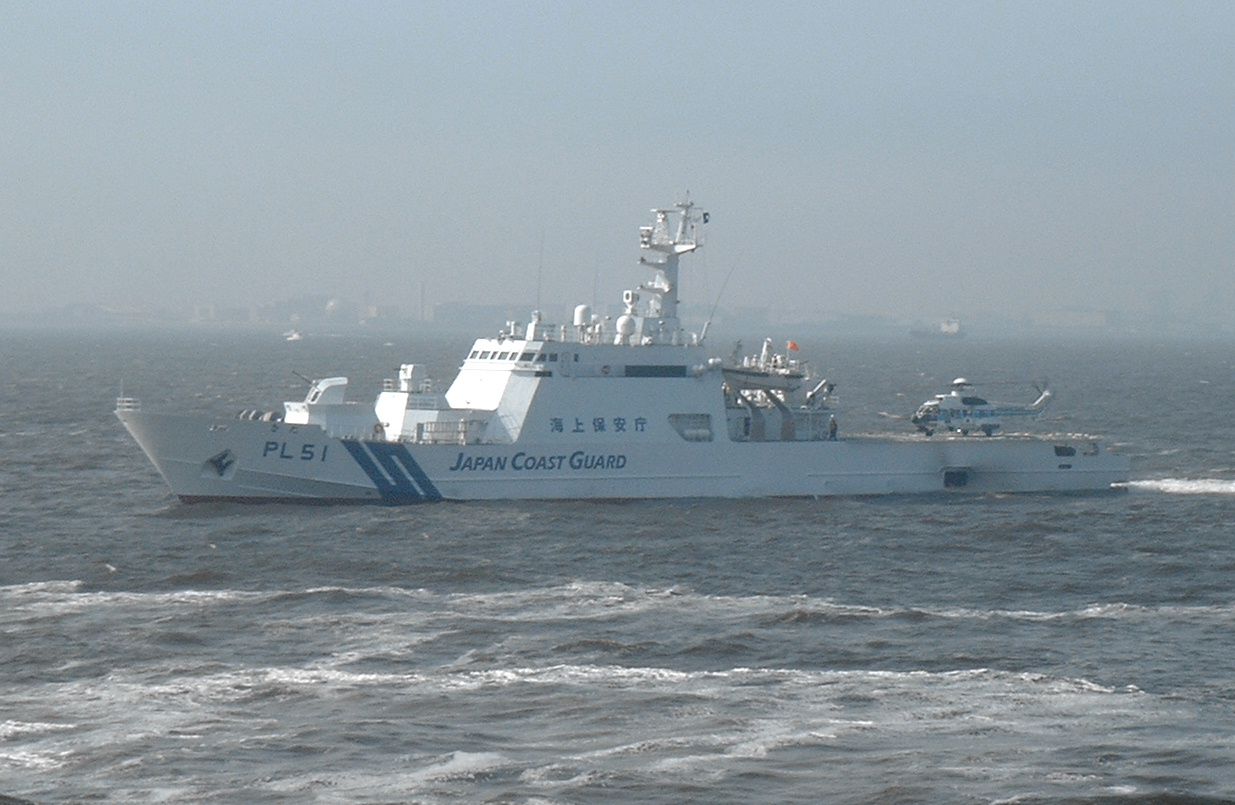
- Hida (PL-51)

Class overview
- Name: Hida class
- Operators: Japan Coast Guard
- Built: 2003–2008
- In commission: 2006–present
- Completed: 3
- Active: 3

General characteristics
- Type: 2,000 ton-class PL (Patrol vessel, Large)
- Tonnage: 1,800 GT
- Length: 95.0 m (311 ft 8 in)
- Beam: 12.6 m (41 ft 4 in)
- Depth: 9 m (29 ft 6 in)
- Propulsion: 4 × Waterjets; 4 × diesel engines
- Speed: 30 knots (56 km/h) or over
- Armament: 1 × Bofors 40 mm L/70 Mk3 gun with optical FCS; 1 × JM61 20 mm gun with RFS
- Armour: Ballistic protection over certain areas
- Aviation facilities: aft helicopter deck and refueling facilities

The Hida-class patrol vessel are a class of patrol vessel within the PL series (Large patrol vessel) of the Japan Coast Guard (JCG). The class name "Hida" is named after Hida Mountains, the northernmost mountain range of the Japanese Alps, a famous mountain range in Japan.

The class is one of the more modern patrol vessel classes designed to intercept North Korean (DPRK) spy boats. These classes are referred to as "High-speed, high-functionality patrol vessel, large" (高速高機能大型巡視船). The vessels carry a Bofors 40 mm L/70 autocannon with a laser-optical fire-control system, and are able to safely deal with heavily armed spy boats of the DPRK which intrude into Japanese waters. The hull of this class is bulletproof in cases of close-range firefights using small arms.

Ships of this class are among the leading vessels of flotillas intended for spy boat interception. With the helicopter deck of this class, a Special Security Team can arrive at the scene aboard Eurocopter EC225 helicopters. The broadband SATCOM system of this class can relay video data from helicopters to the ground station or the HQ of the JCG. This class is equipped with a LIDAR system to acquire targets with high accuracy, and at the same time, this system enables them to perform search and rescue mission more safely.

== Ships in the class ==
Ships in the class
Pennant number	Ship name	Builder	Commission	Homeport
PL51	Hida	Mitsubishi Heavy Industries	18 April 2006	Niigata
PL52	Akaishi	IHI Marine United	18 April 2006	Kagoshima
PL53	Kiso	IHI Marine United	11 March 2008	Sakaiminato

== See also ==
- List of Japan Coast Guard vessels and aircraft
- Aso-class patrol vessel – another class of High-speed, high-functionality patrol vessel, large.
