= Aso-class patrol vessel =

Japanese class of coast guard ships

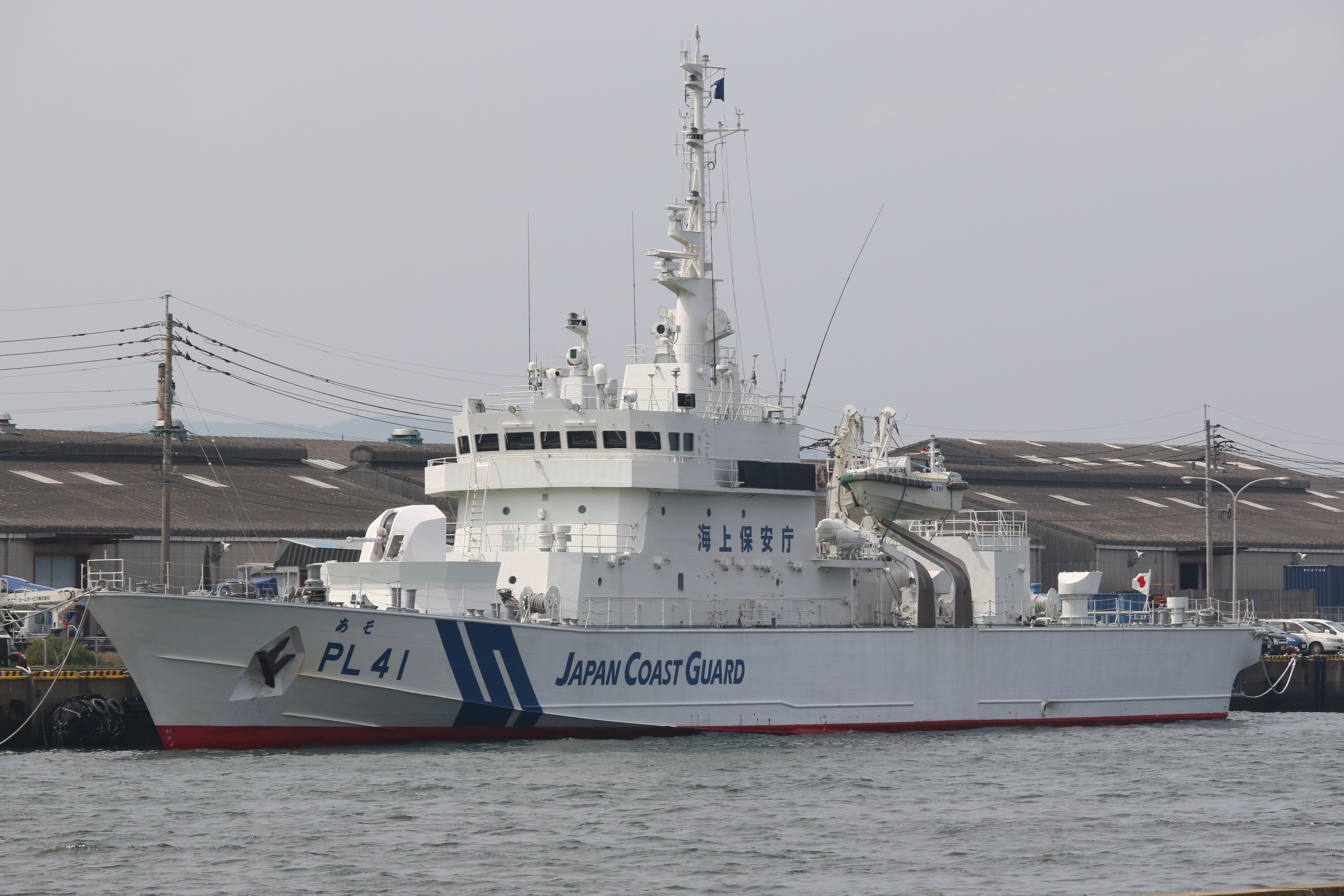
- Aso (PL 41)

Class overview
- Name: Aso class
- Builders: Mitsubishi Heavy Industries, Universal Shipbuilding Corporation
- Operators: Japan Coast Guard
- Preceded by: Ojika class
- Succeeded by: Hateruma class
- Subclasses: TT-1500 design
- Built: 2002–2006
- In commission: 2005–present
- Planned: 3
- Completed: 3
- Active: 3

General characteristics (Aso class)
- Type: 1,000 ton-class PL (Patrol vessel, Large)
- Tonnage: 770 GT
- Length: 79.0 m (259 ft 2 in)
- Beam: 10.0 m (32 ft 10 in)
- Depth: 6 m (19 ft 8 in)
- Propulsion: 4 × Waterjets; 4 × diesel engines
- Speed: 30+ knots
- Complement: 30
- Armament: One Bofors 40 mm L/70 gun with optical FCS
- Armour: Ballistic protection over certain areas

Class overview
- Name: Unamed patrol vessel
- Builders: TBA
- Operators: Vietnam Coast Guard
- Preceded by: (South Korea) Han River-class vessel
- Cost: USD $398,430,000 for six vessels
- Built: Jul. 2020 - Oct. 2026 (planned)
- Planned: 6
- On order: 6
- Completed: 0
- Active: 0

General characteristics
- Type: General-purpose TT (tuần tra)-classification offshore patrol vessels
- Displacement: 1,500 ton
- Length: 79.0 m (259 ft 2 in)
- Beam: 11.0 m (36 ft 1 in)
- Height: 6.8 m (22 ft 4 in) (freeboard)
- Draught: 3.3 m (10 ft 10 in)
- Speed: 24 knots (44 km/h; 28 mph)
- Range: 4,000 nautical miles (4,600 mi; 7,400 km)
- Armament: Primary weapon station(s) using the ZU-23-2 or PT-306 autocannons with optoelectronics-based FCS; Secondary weapon stations using the 12.7mm NSV or the 14.5mm KPV heavy machine guns, likely remote-controlled
- Aviation facilities: One helipad and hangar
- Notes: Characteristics extracted from the 2018 early projection and likely become subjects to be changed

The Aso-class patrol vessel is a class of PL type patrol vessel of the Japan Coast Guard. PL stands for Patrol vessel Large, and the class is named after Mount Aso, the largest active volcano in Japan.

This class is one of the new patrol vessel classes to intercept spy boats of DPRK. These classes are called "高速高機能大型巡視船", High-speed, high-functionality patrol vessel, large. Having Bofors 40 mm L/70 autocannon with fire-control system, this class is safely able to deal with heavily armed spy boats of DPRK which intrude into Japanese waters. The hull of this class is bulletproof in case of close-range firefights.

In the back of the bridge's side, this class has display devices that can be used to instruct other ships to stop even at nighttime. And on the bridge superstructure, this class is equipped with the LIDAR system to acquire targets with high accuracy. At the same time, this system enables them to perform search and rescue missions more safely.

== Vietnamese variant ==
In 2020 there was signed an export deal between Japan and Vietnam over 6 vessel for the Vietnam Coast Guard (VCG).. According to pieces of information shared by VCG, the class has a slightly bigger size than the original Aso-class, and it is also equipped with a helipad and the overall design is likely inspired from the successor designs such as the Kunigami-class patrol vessel.

The ship will have a maximum speed of 24 knots, considerably slower than the original Aso, however it is projected to have a better low-speed stability hence making it better for low-intensity patrol and search-and-rescue missions. The delivery for all 6 ships is expected to be completed by October 2026.

== Ships in the class ==
Ships in the class
Pennant number	Ship name	Builder	Commission	Homeport
Japan Coast Guard (Aso-class)
PL 41	Aso	Mitsubishi Heavy Industries	15 March 2005	Fukuoka
PL 42	Dewa	Universal Shipbuilding Corporation	12 April 2006	Akita
PL 43	Hakusan	Universal Shipbuilding Corporation	12 April 2006	Kanazawa
Vietnam Coast Guard
CSB 8*** (1)		TBA	TBA	TBA
CSB 8*** (2)		TBA	TBA	TBA
CSB 8*** (3)		TBA	TBA	TBA
CSB 8*** (4)		TBA	TBA	TBA
CSB 8*** (5)		TBA	TBA	TBA
CSB 8*** (6)		TBA	TBA	TBA

== See also ==
- List of Japan Coast Guard vessels and aircraft
- Hida-class patrol vessel - another class of High-speed, high-functionality patrol vessel, large.
