= Shiretoko-class patrol vessel =

Japan Coast Guard patrol vessel

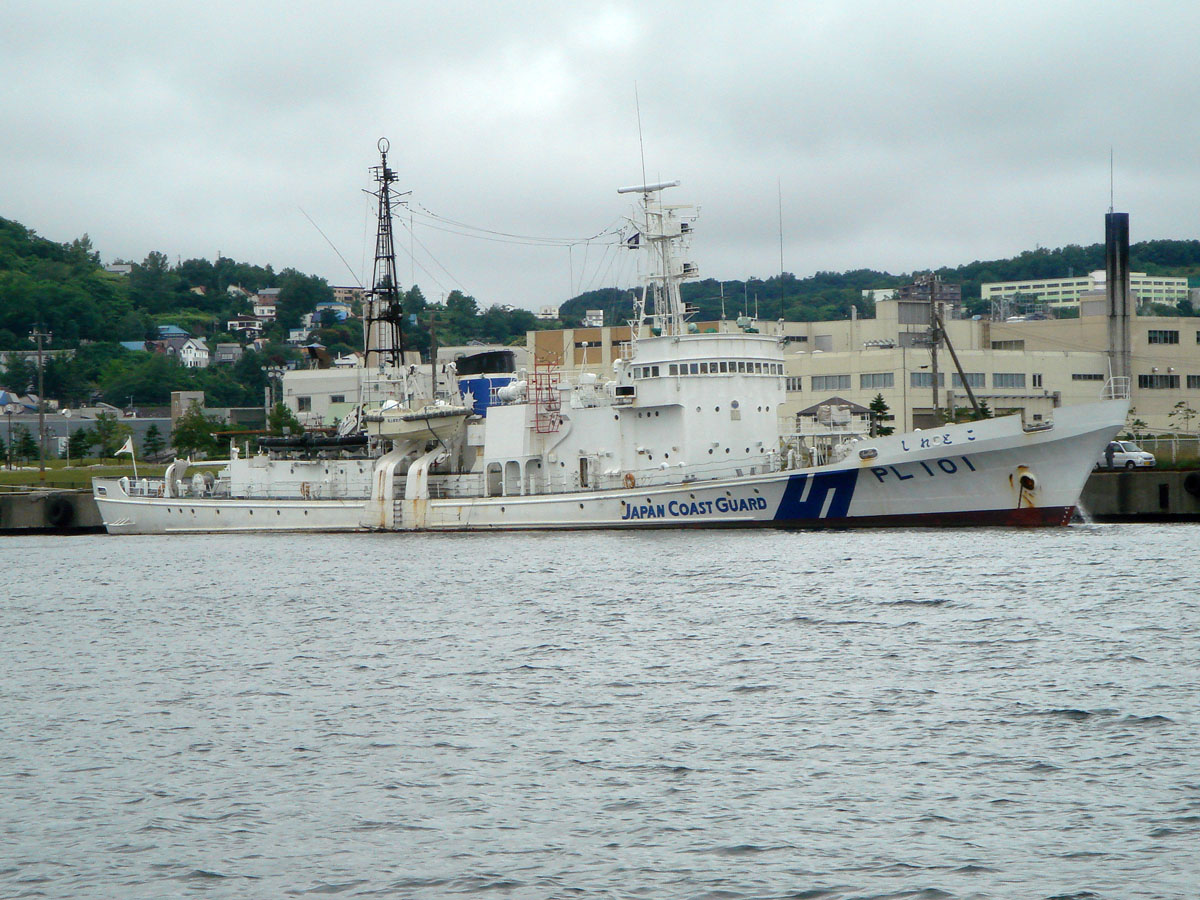
- Shiretoko (PL-101)

Class overview
- Name: Shiretoko class
- Operators: Japan Coast Guard; (former Maritime Safety Agency)
- Preceded by: Daiou class
- Succeeded by: Nojima
- Built: 1978–1982
- In commission: 1978–2016
- Completed: 28
- Active: 0
- Retired: 28

General characteristics
- Type: 1,000 ton-class PL (Patrol vessel, Large)
- Tonnage: 980 GT
- Displacement: normal: 1,200 tons; full load: 1,360 tons
- Length: 78.0 m (255 ft 11 in)
- Beam: 9.60 m (31 ft 6 in)
- Draught: 3.42 m (11 ft 3 in)
- Depth: 5.30 m (17 ft 5 in)
- Propulsion: 2 × shafts CP props; 2 × diesel engines; (7,000 ps/5,148kW)
- Speed: 20.0 knots (37.0 km/h; 23.0 mph)
- Range: 4,400 nmi (8,100 km; 5,100 mi)
- Boats & landing craft carried: 2 × 7 m class RHIBs; 2 × 4.8 m class RHIB
- Complement: 41
- Sensors & processing systems: JMA-1576 surface search radar; JMA-1596 navigation radar
- Armament: originally as designed on early ships; Bofors 40mm L/60 gun; Oerlikon 20mm cannon; later ships; Oerlikon KDC 35mm gun; early ships (modernization/replacement guns); JM61-M 20mm gun

The Shiretoko-class patrol vessel (Japanese: しれとこ型巡視船) is a class of PL type patrol vessels of the Japan Coast Guard (JCG; former Maritime Safety Agency, MSA). PL stands for "Patrol vessel Large", and the class name "Shiretoko" is named after Shiretoko, the northeastern area of the island of Hokkaidō, Japan

== Background ==
In 1977, Act on Territorial Waters and Contiguous Water Area and the Act on Temporary Measures Concerning Fishery Waters was confirmed by the National Diet of Japan to adapt for the UNCLOS III. As a direct result of these acts, the coverage area of the MSA was dramatically extended, so the update of their equipment became an urgent issue. In consequence of these situations, the MSA had put some series of patrol vessels into commission from late 1970s to early 1980s. This class was one of these series, planned to form the main fleet in the high-endurance mission.

== Design ==
This class was designed as the enlarged and mass-production variant of the Daiou class, preceding large patrol vessels. Like the Daiou-class, the hull is ice resistant, but the hull structure has been further strengthened by increasing the thickness of the ice belt and the number of ribs.

As designed, it was to be equipped with one Bofors 40 mm L/60 gun and one Oerlikon 20 mm cannon; latter-batch vessels had their weapon changed to the newer Oerlikon KDC 35 mm gun, and the obsolete 20mm machine gun was dropped. And later, ships of the early-batch had their weapon converted to the JM61-M 20 mm gun.

== Ships in the class ==
| Pennant number | Ship name | Builder | Commission | Decommission |
|---|---|---|---|---|
| PL101 | Shiretoko | Mitsui Engineering & Shipbuilding | 8 November 1978 | 26 March 2012 |
| PL102 | Esan | Sumitomo Heavy Industries | 16 November 1978 | 19 December 2008 |
| PL103 | Kusakaki (former Wakasa) | Kawasaki Heavy Industries | 16 November 1978 | 21 October 2015 |
| PL104 | Atsumi (former Yahiko, Shimanto, Kii) | Mitsubishi Heavy Industries | 16 November 1978 | 21 October 2015 |
| PL105 | Ojika (former Motobu) | Sasebo Heavy Industries | 29 November 1978 | 20 October 2000 |
| PL106 | Rishiri | Shikoku Dockyard | 12 September 1979 | 18 March 2006 |
| PL107 | Matsushima | Tohoku Zosen | 14 September 1979 | 7 February 2009 |
| PL108 | Iwaki | Naikai Zosen Corporation | 10 August 1979 | 12 March 2006 |
| PL109 | Shikine | Usuki Shipyard | 20 September 1979 | 4 September 2009 |
| PL110 | Suruga | Kurushima Zosen | 28 September 1979 | 5 February 2010 |
| PL111 | Rebun | Narasaki Shipbuilding Corporation | 21 November 1979 | 12 December 2008 |
| PL112 | Chōkai | Nipponkai Heavy Industries | 30 November 1979 | 12 March 2008 |
| PL113 | Nojima (former Ashizuri) | Sanoyas Shipyard | 31 October 1979 | 18 March 2006 |
| PL114 | Tosa (former Oki) | Tsuneishi Shipbuilding | 16 November 1979 | 29 January 2009 |
| PL115 | Yōtei (former Noto) | Miho Shipyard | 30 November 1979 | 21 December 2015 |
| PL116 | Yonakuni | Hayashikane Shipbuilding | 31 October 1979 | 2 February 2005 |
| PL117 | Suruga (former Daisetsu, Kudaka, Kurikoma, Iwami, Rebun) | Hakodate Dock | 31 January 1980 | 20 January 2016 |
| PL118 | Shimokita | Ishikawajima-Harima Heavy Industries | 12 March 1980 | 26 March 2012 |
| PL119 | Suzuka | Kanasashi Zosen | 7 March 1980 | 5 February 2010 |
| PL120 | Kunisaki | Koyo Dockyard Company | 29 February 1980 | 18 October 2016 |
| PL121 | Amaki (former Genkai) | Oshima Shipbuilding | 31 January 1980 | 5 February 2008 |
| PL122 | Itoshima (former Gotou, Iwami) | Onomichi Dockyard | 29 February 1980 | 21 October 2015 |
| PL123 | Koshiki | Kasado Dockyard | 25 January 1980 | 5 February 2010 |
| PL124 | Hateruma | Osaka Shipbuilding | 12 March 1980 | 27 February 2008 |
| PL125 | Katori | Tohoku Zosen | 17 October 1980 | 21 October 2016 |
| PL126 | Oshika (former Kunigami, Matsushima) | Kanda Shipbuilding | 21 October 1980 | 20 January 2016 |
| PL127 | Etomo | Naikai Zosen Corporation | 17 March 1982 | 26 September 2016 |
| PL128 | Esan (former Masyu, Amagi, Yonakuni) | Shikoku Dockyard | 12 March 1982 | 26 September 2016 |

== See also ==
- List of Japan Coast Guard vessels and aircraft
