= Hakone Ekiden =

Annual university relay race between Tokyo and Hakone in Japan

- Logos for the Hakone Ekiden
- Date: 2 - 3 January
- Location: Round trip between Yomiuri Shimbun Building, Tokyo and Lake Ashi, Hakone
- Event type: Road Relay
- Distance: 217.1 kilometers
- Primary sponsor: Sapporo Beer
- Established: February 14, 1920; 106 years ago
- Course records: Overall: 10:37:34 (2026); Aoyama Gakuin; Day 1: 5:18:08 (2026); Aoyama Gakuin; Day 2: 5:19:26 (2026); Aoyama Gakuin
- Website: KCRR Official Site; Yomuri Official Site

Hakone Ekiden (箱根駅伝), officially called the Tokyo-Hakone Round Trip College Ekiden Race (東京箱根間往復大学駅伝競走, Tōkyō Hakone kan Ōfuku Daigaku Ekiden Kyōsō), is an ekiden (relay marathon) race held between Tokyo and Hakone in Japan on January 2 and 3. Hakone Ekiden is one of the most prominent university-level Ekiden races of the year and is part of the two ekiden race events that celebrate the new year, the other one being the New Year Ekiden for corporate teams on January 1st.

The race is telecast on Nippon Television and streamed on TVer and in the special Yomuri coverage website for the event.

This two-day race from Ōtemachi to Hakone and back is separated into five legs on each day. Due to slight variations in the courses, the first day distance is 107.5 km while the distance on the second day is 109.6 km.

== Rules ==
Five legs are provided between Tokyo and Hakone each way. Each runner runs one section, and alternates with the next runner at a station. Each team has ten runners, who each run with their team's sash which is handed over to the next runner on the team at each station.

=== Participation ===
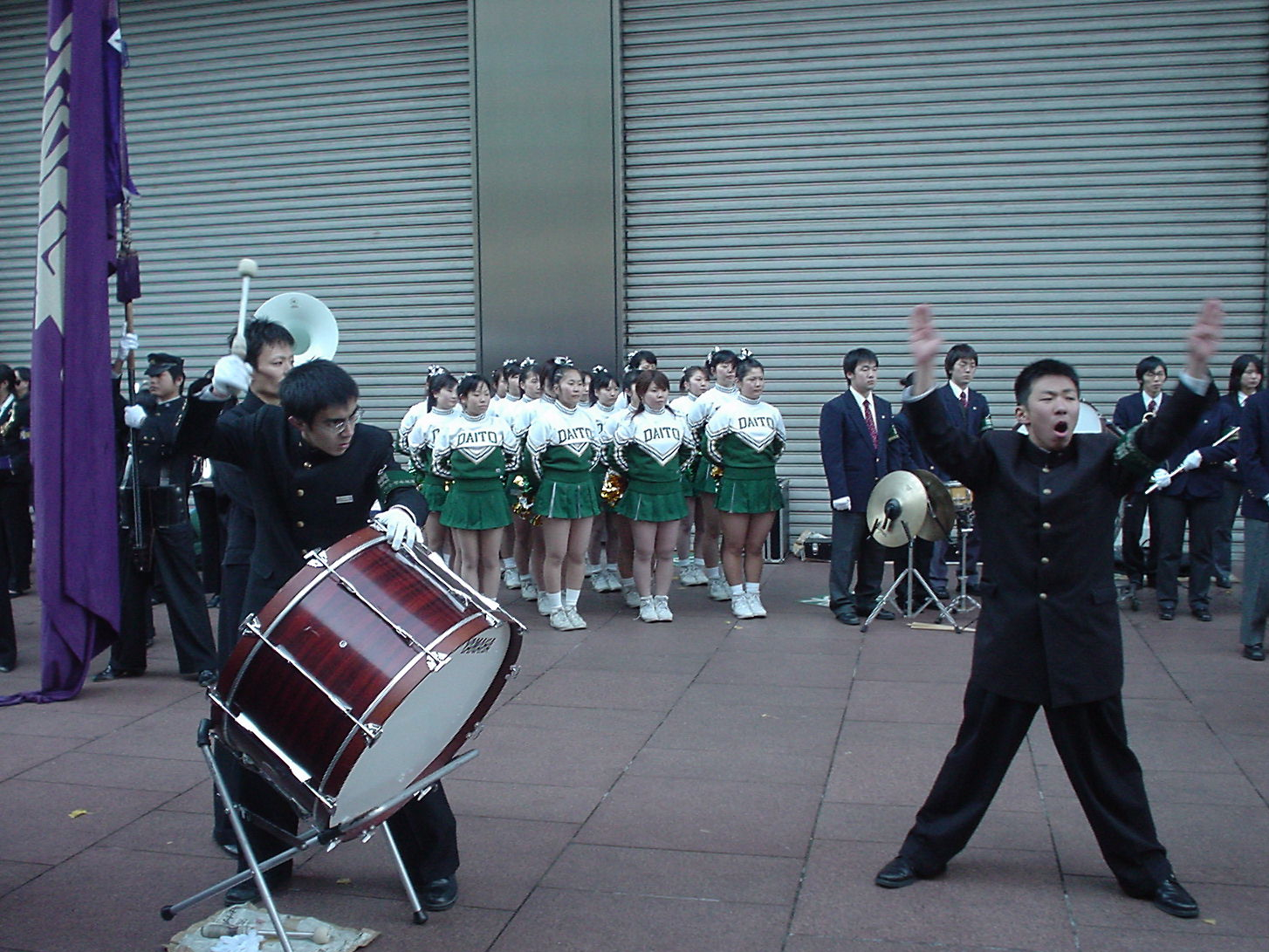
Daito Bunka University cheer staff demonstrates that school spirit is an important aspect of the Hakone Ekiden.

Twenty universities, which belong to The Inter-University Athletic Union of Kanto (関東学生陸上競技連盟, Kantō gakusei rikujō kyōgi renmei), can participate in this Ekiden. Ten of them are seeded teams that qualify by virtue of finishing in the top ten the previous year. Ten more teams qualify through their team results at the Hakone Ekiden Yosenkai, a 20 km qualifier held in the October preceding the race. A final non-competing select team, the Kanto Region University Student United Team (関東学生連合チーム, Kantō gakusei rengō chiimu), made up of top-placing individuals at October's Yosenkai 20 km Road Race from universities that do not qualify for Hakone as teams. The 2014 and 2024 races did not include a select team, and before 2014, the select team was called the Kanto Region Select Team (関東学連選抜チーム, Kantō gakuren senbatsu chiimu), and were also constituted by a selection of top runners from universities that did not qualify as one of the 20 participating teams.

=== Seed rights ===
Teams who finished 10th place or better will be seeded and guarantees participation in the Hakone Ekiden for the next year.

=== Forfeiture ===
If a runner retires en route to a station because of an accident, injury, or dehydration, his team is treated as retired. Although runners for following sections may run, their times are not officially recorded.

=== Early Start ===
Failing to get to the relay station within 10 minutes (End of legs 1-2), 15 minutes (End of legs 3-4) or 20 minutes (End of legs 6-9) after the first runner has passed the same station will result in an "Early Start." In the case of an early start, the next runner departs before the previous runner finishes. When the runner is done, the time of the previous runner and the next runner are added together to the ending time. "Early Start" rules apply in the start of Day 2 as well. If, on the day before, a runner finishes 10 minutes after the first runner has finished, an early start is instituted.

The Tsurumi Relay Station (on the return) is notorious for its "Early Starts." Almost every year there is an "Early Start" at Tsurumi, and the 160m exposed path leading to the relay station can cause teammates to get high emotions, as the clock ticks down.

== Course ==
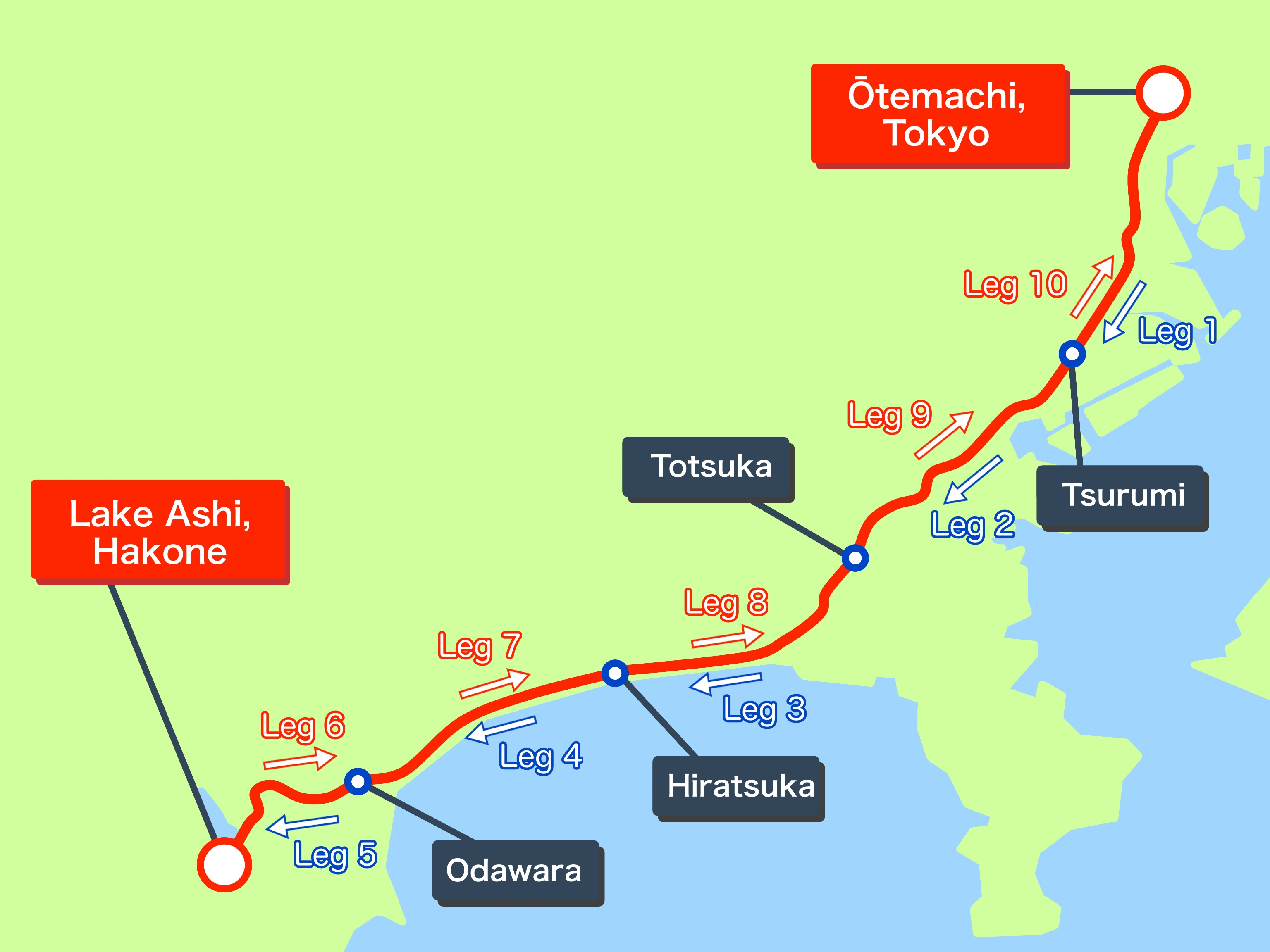
Course of the Hakone Ekiden

=== The Climb: Day 1, January 2 ===
==== Leg 1 (21.3 km) From Ōtemachi, Tokyo to Tsurumi, Yokohama ====
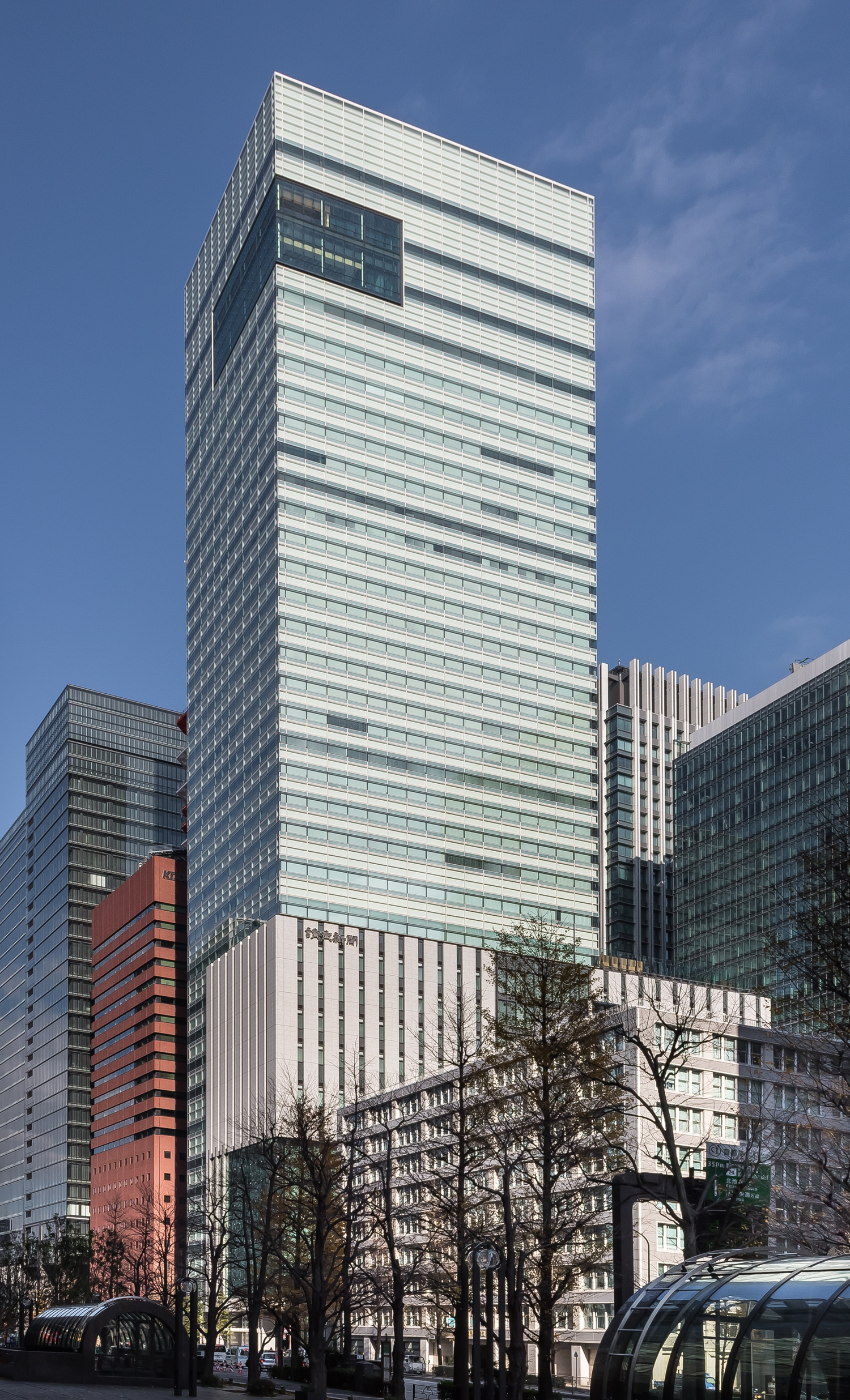
The start of the race is in front of the Yomiuri Shimbun Building

Course Record : Aoki, Rui (Senior, Kokugakuin University) - 1:00:28 (2026)

The race begins promptly at 8:00 a.m. in front of the Yomiuri Shimbun Building in Ōtemachi, Tokyo, and follows a relatively flat course along Hibiya-Dori and National Route 15 past various Tokyo landmarks such as Tokyo Imperial Palace, Tokyo Station, Hibiya Park, Zōjō-ji, and Tokyo Tower. Past Shinagawa Station, the runners will encounter some slopes at Shin-Yatsuyamabashi (新八ツ山橋) as well as Rokugōbashi over the Tama River at the 17 km mark, before arriving at the Tsurumi relay station.

This is one of the defining legs because the first runner's rank affects the flow of the entire ekiden for his team. Usually, for the first 10 kilometers of the race, runners clump into one group. Eventually this group breaks down as people go ahead of the group or fall behind. Therefore, colleges put decently strong runners in the first leg whom can either pace with this group or go ahead. In addition, usually runners with faster sprints run this leg.

Episodes:

- In the 66th Hakone Ekiden, the Nihon University runner Yoshihide Tanigawa accidentally diverted from the course. Other runners soon followed, and before long every runner had diverted from the course. Due to traffic regulations not being properly done, there was a scene when a car passed by a runner at a dangerously high speed. For the fact that everyone had diverted from the course, the 1st leg results were not nullified.
- In the 95th Hakone Ekiden, Komazawa University lost 10 seconds of time when 2nd Leg runner Ichitaka Yamashita failed to appear at Tsurumi relay station on time.
- In the 102nd Hakone Ekiden, the 1st leg was run at such a high pace that the first 8 runners (including the OP runner) ran at a sub-1 hour, 1 minute time.
- The distance of this leg has barely changed historically.

==== Leg 2 (23.1 km) From Tsurumi to Totsuka ====
Course Record : Victor Kimutai (Senior, Jōsai University) - 1:05:09 (2026)

After departing the Tsurumi relay station, the runners reach Yokohama Station before following National Route 1 on their way to Totsuka relay station. As part of the traditional 53 Stations of the Tōkaidō, the runners will face a significant uphill climb at Gontazaka at the 13 km mark. The last 3 km section at Totsuka (Sometimes called “Totsuka no Kabe (戸塚の壁) or “Totsuka wall”) is also made up of a combination of uphill climbs and downhill descents.

As this is the longest leg of the race, the fastest runner in each team traditionally runs on this course. In addition, the overseas runner for international schools usually runs this course. This is a decisive leg in the Hakone Ekiden, not because it is the longest one and decides the winner, but rather because this leg sets the stage for later legs.

This is the type of leg in which going too fast can easily cause a loss of stamina in the latter half.

The leg is often referred to as Leg 2 of Flowers (花の2区) in reference to its often star-studded runners and status.

Episodes:

- Historically (46th-54th Hakone Ekidens), this leg had been 25.2km, which is over 2km longer than today.
- The fastest Japanese runner for this leg is Yoshida, Hibiki, at 1:05:43.
- Ever since the 65th Hakone Ekiden, the only times when an overseas runner did not run Leg 2 was during the 73th-76th Hakone Ekidens, the 88th Hakone Ekiden, and the 91st Hakone Ekiden.
- Between the 82nd and 92nd Hakone Ekidens, Leg 5 was actually longer than Leg 2.

==== Leg 3 (21.4 km) From Totsuka to Hiratsuka ====
Course Record : Vincent Yegon (Freshman, Tokyo International University) - 59:25 (2020)

The first 9 km of leg is marked with a gentle descent through Yugo-ji-zaka as the course gradually departs the urban areas towards the Shōnan coastline. The runners join National Route 134 at Chigasaki, and travel along the coastline with Mount Fuji in front of them and Sagami Bay to their left. Leg 3 finishes after the runners cross the Shonan Bridge over Sagami River, and reaches the Hiratsuka relay station on the coast.

Though considered to be the most scenic leg of the entire race, strong and sometimes unpredictable sea winds force runners to adapt as they exit the urban sections of the race. Usually runners specializing in more short-distance runs (5000m, 10000m) run this leg.

Episodes:

- The fastest Japanese runner for this leg is Ota, Aoi, at 59:47.
- The distance of this leg has barely changed historically.

==== Leg 4 (20.9 km) From Hiratsuka to Odawara ====
Some runners and support staff in Oiso, Kanagawa during the Hakone Ekiden in 2024, at the relay station between legs 3 and 4.

Course Record : Vincent Yegon (Senior, Tokyo International University) - 1:00:00 (2023)

The shortest flat section of the race, leg 4 leads runners parallel to the Tokaido Main Line past towns of Ōiso and Ninomiya, before crossing the Sakawa River into the heart of Odawara. Passing by Odawara Castle, the last 3 km stretch of this leg sees a gradual uphill climb, a prelude to leg 5.

Usually, one of the strongest runners of the team runs this leg, as it is one of the most decisive legs of the Ekiden.

Episodes:

- Though nowadays the strongest runners of the team runs this leg, that had not always been the case. Between the 82nd and 92nd Hakone Ekidens, this leg had been shortened into a mere 18.5km. The aim in shortening this leg was to bring more speed runners into the scene. However, the ups and downs of this leg prevented the runner from increasing speed anyways. For this reason, colleges tended to put fast runners on the 3rd leg instead. As a result, in the 93rd Hakone Ekiden, the leg was put back to normal distance.
  - The fastest runner for the old course was Tamura, Kazuki, at 54:28.
- The fastest Japanese runner for this leg is Rui Suzuki, at 1:00:01.

==== Leg 5 (20.8 km) From Odawara to Lake Ashi, Hakone ====
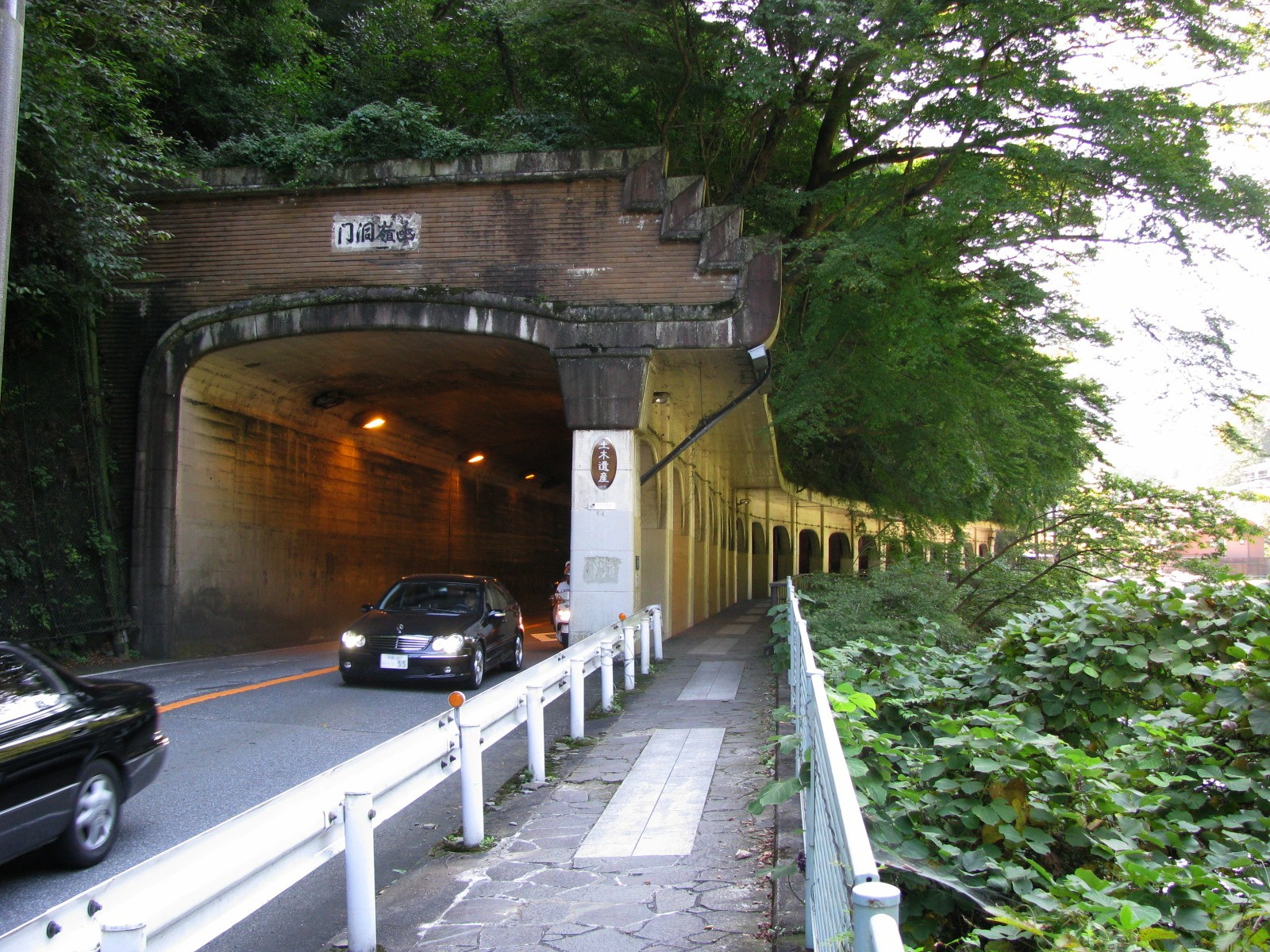
The Kanreidoumon Gallery marks the beginning of the mountain climb in Leg 5

Course Record : Kuroda, Asahi (Senior, Aoyama Gakuin University) - 1:07:16 (2026)

After passing by Hakone-Yumoto Station, the runners run past (or in earlier editions, run through) the Kanreidoumon Gallery to begin their climbs, and pass by various Hakone sights such as the Fujiya Hotel, Hakone Kowakien, a railroad crossing for the Hakone Tozan Line near Kowakidani Station, and Hakone Keimei Gakuen before reaching the highest point of National Route 1 at the 16.2 km mark. Finally, the runners run through the town of Moto-Hakone under the Torii of Hakone Shrine at 19 km, and reach the finish line at Lake Ashi

Colloquially called The Mountain Climb (山上り) , leg 5 is considered to be one of the most grueling sections of the race that sees runners climb up to 874 m at the highest point of leg. While almost all competitors forego tank tops and opt to dress in long sleeved apparel to combat the low temperatures, leg 5 sometimes sees runners fall to conditions such as hypothermia and hypoglycemia due to its trying nature. This leg often sees uphill specialists from each team being deployed, with many often only running this section for their universities throughout their collegiate career. Those who have consistent high finishes in this section are traditionally referred to as God of the Mountain (山の神).

Episodes:

- In the 82nd Hakone Ekiden, the distance was changed to 23.4km, making it the longest Hakone leg of the time.
  - The fastest record for this course was Katsuwabawa, Ryuji, at 1:16:39.
- In the 91st Hakone Ekiden it was remeasured to 23.2km.
  - The fastest record for this course was Kamino, Daichi, at 1:16:15.
- In the 93rd Hakone Ekiden, it was changed back to 20.8km, following hypothermia and hypoglycemia concerns to those that ran this leg.
  - By this point, three runners had prematurely ended their run due to these harsh conditions.

=== The Descent: Day 2, January 3 ===
==== Leg 6 (20.8 km) From Lake Ashi, Hakone to Odawara ====
Course Record : Nomura, Akimu (Senior, Aoyama Gakuin University) - 56:47 (2025)

Day 2 of the race begins at 8:00 a.m. with leg 6 being a reverse course of leg 5 from day 1, and its first 4 km section is an uphill section before rapidly descending the mountains, past the same sights as those of leg 5. The teams' coaches are not allowed to join the teams until they have reached Hakone-Yumoto Station at the base of the mountain.

As a reverse of leg 5 and colloquially called The Mountain Descent (山下り) , the downhill leg 6 is a very speedy affair with average runner speeds of 25 km per hour. However, there are a lot of turns that can gradually cause knee pain, and the last 3km of the leg is completely flat, making it feel like an upward climb for the runners. In addition, runners also need to combat the morning chills of starting early in the morning atop of the mountains, which can feature icy and slippery course conditions. As a combination of these challenging conditions, leg 6 also sees a high number of specialist runners much like leg 5, and those who participate often take tolls on their legs and feet as they reach the bottom of the mountain.

Episodes:

- The starting procedure for the Descent is as follows: At 8:00 a.m. exactly, the team that had finished the "Ascent" in 1st place (the day before) starts the 6th Leg. Then, based on finish time for the Ascent, other teams, one by one, start departing for the Descent leg.
  - Note that if on the Ascent, a runner finishes 10 minutes after the first-place runner has finished, an early start is put into play.
- This distance of this leg has barely changed historically.
- In the 66th Hakone Ekiden, the 6th Leg runner for Asia University forgot to put on his Tasuki, resulting in a 40 second time loss
- At the start of the 77th Hakone Ekiden, the starting pistol for Hosei University failed to ring, resulting in a 25 second time loss visually.

==== Leg 7 (21.3 km) From Odawara to Hiratsuka ====
Course Record : Satō, Keita (Junior, Komazawa University) - 1:00:43 (2025)

A near-reverse course of leg 4, leg 7 is slightly longer than its parallel during day 1 due to the fact that near Oiso station, the 7th Leg heads toward land instead of toward the coast. In addition, this leg sees its runners leave the mountains and head to the coast near Hiratsuka on a mostly flat course with minor inclines after 9 km.

As the sun rises throughout the course of leg 7, the difference of temperature between the start in Odawara and the finish at Hiratsuka is the largest out of all other sections. Runners have to combat and adapt to the changing weather conditions as they move towards Hiratsuka.

There have been some instances in which a strong runner recovering from an injury is put into this leg.

Episodes:

- The distance of this leg has barely changed historically.

==== Leg 8 (21.4 km) From Hiratsuka to Totsuka ====
Course Record : Shiode, Shōta (Senior, Aoyama Gakuin University) - 1:03:45 (2026)

A reverse course of leg 3, the first half of leg 8 is mostly flat, however near Fujisawa there is a significant uphill section near Yugyōji-no-saka (遊行寺の坂) which may cause some runners difficulties.

As the temperatures continue to rise, some runners fall into states of dehydration near Yugyōji-no-saka, and proper management of runners' physical conditions is critical in leading the way to a successful final 2 legs of the race.

Episodes:

- There are many last-minute runner changes on this leg.
- The distance of this leg has barely changed historically.

==== Leg 9 (23.1 km) From Totsuka to Tsurumi ====
Course Record: Nakamura, Yuito (Junior, Aoyama Gakuin University) - 1:07:15 (2022)

A reverse course of leg 2, leg 9 is the longest leg of day 2. After revisiting Gontazaka, now as a downhill section, the rest of the course past Hodogaya Station is a mostly flat affair leading to the Tsurumi relay station.

This leg is called Leg 9 of Pines (松の9区) to indicate its importance. The leg is critical for leading teams to cement their lead or for trailing teams to close their distance, either in a fight for the championship or a top-10 seeding position to guarantee their return to the next year's race. Owing to the strength of runners in this sections, overtakes are not uncommon during leg 9.

Additionally, the Tsurumi relay station at the end of leg 9 is the most common place for early starts (Kuriage-sutāto (繰り上げスタート)) to occur, as teams need to reach Tsurumi within 20 minutes of the race leaders to prevent a forced early start. Because of the symbolic importance of physically relaying the Tasuki to each teammate throughout the race, emotions often run high when teams fail to do so. The 160 m clear straight section at Tsurumi exacerbates this: teams close to the 20 minute cut-off physically see their teammates near the relay station, but not all teams make the successful exchange at this final relay station.

Most teams place their semi-fast runners for this leg.

Episodes:

- This leg commonly becomes the stage for winner/runner-up overtakes, most recently being the 84th Hakone Ekiden.
- In the 69th Hakone Ekiden, Toyo University manages to relay the Tasuki at almost the exact same time as the starting pistol.
- In the 88th Hakone Ekiden, Kanagawa University almost fails to relay the Tasuki when the previous runner collapses multiple times while trying to relay the Tasuki. At the end he manages to relay the Tasuki at almost the same time as the starting pistol (though it was actually relayed 2 seconds after the early start was supposed to happen.)

==== Leg 10 (23.0 km) From Tsurumi to Otemachi, Tokyo ====
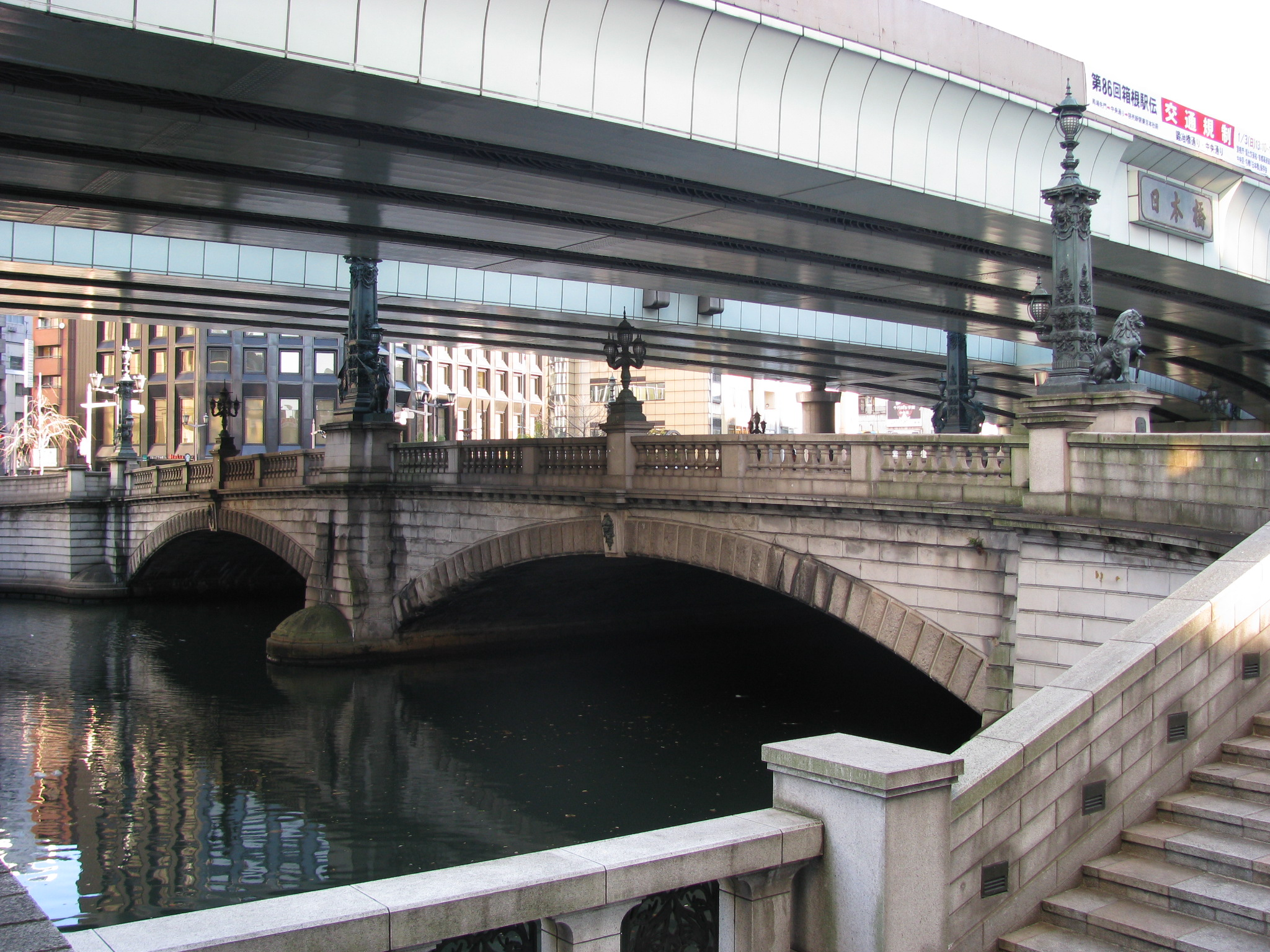
The race concludes approximately 1 kilometre after runners cross Nihonbashi, where the Kilometre Zero of Japan is located

Course Record : Satō, Keita (Senior, Komazawa University) - 1:07:31 (2026)

A near-reverse course of leg 1, and similar to the opening leg, leg 10 is largely flat as runners head towards central Tokyo. The leg follows the same course as leg 1 until the final section, where it deviates east at Babasakimon (馬場先門) in front of the Nijubashi of the Tokyo Imperial Palace before turning north on Chuo-Dori through Kyōbashi. After crossing Nihonbashi, the race returns and concludes in front of the Yomiuri Shimbun Building, where the finish line awaits.

The spectating crowds grow gradually as the race progresses through leg 10, and runners have to face strong winds between tall buildings as they enter more built-up areas of Tokyo. As the final runners of each team close out the race, their teammates await them at the finish line in celebration and reflection.

== Origin ==
Hakone Ekiden was started in 1920. Shizo Kanakuri, who is known as the father of the Japanese marathon, conceived the idea. His enthusiastic idea of bringing up a runner who could compete in the world became the driving force of establishing Hakone Ekiden. When Kanaguri was a Tokyo Koto Shihan school (Koshi) student, he participated in Olympic Games in Stockholm in 1912 as one of the representative Japanese marathon runners. He had to give up his race on the way, however.

In the meantime, the first ekiden, Tokaido ekidentohokyoso (東海道駅伝徒歩競走) was held in 1917 between Sanjō Ōhashi, Kyoto and Ueno Shinobazunoike (上野不忍池) Tokyo, celebrating 50 years after Tokyo became the capital. This race was a big relay race between Kyoto and Tokyo (516 km) held by Yomiuri Shimbun for three days. It succeeded and became the original form of Hakone Ekiden. Kanaguri was influenced by the success of the race and persuaded many universities that they should race in the Hakone Ekiden. As a result, Waseda University, Keio University, Meiji University and Tokyo Higher Normal School (now University of Tsukuba) replied to his offer and Hakone Ekiden started. Hakone Ekiden was started with great energy of the pioneers in Japanese sports society. It started during World War I, so industrial areas gradually expanded to the west and the Tokaido road was widened. Reflecting this active atmosphere, the Japanese sports society, including ekiden one, were developing great challenging spirits at that time.

== Criticism ==
Despite being a regional event organized by the Kanto Collegiate Athletic Federation and limited to universities in the Kanto region, the Hakone Ekiden holds greater prestige than national races like the Izumo Ekiden and Japan Collegiate Ekiden Championships, due to its long history and nationwide TV coverage. As a result, the race has significant impact on the landscape of men’s collegiate long-distance running in Japan.

=== Talent Concentration and Regional Disparities ===
The race’s prestige and exclusivity has led to a concentration of top collegiate runners in Kanto universities, as many aspiring runners aim to compete in Hakone Ekiden. This centralization has caused concerns about equity, with universities from other regions frequently calling for the race to open its entry eligibility nationwide. Past attempts to broaden participation have faced opposition from Kanto alumni.

In response, the All-Japan University Ekiden (1970) and Izumo Ekiden (1989) were established as national competitions. However, the Hakone Ekiden retains unmatched prestige, and Kanto universities often dominate these national races as well.

=== Post-Hakone Career Decline ===
Although the original purpose of the Hakone Ekiden was to "develop long-distance runners from Japan capable of competing on the world stage," in reality, many athletes treat the event as their ultimate goal. Upon graduation, a significant number choose not to join corporate teams or continue competing at an elite level.

== Level of competition in 2010 ==
In the 2010 (86th) race, of the 380 athletes (190 runners and 190 alternates) that represent the 19 universities, 328 have run under 14:40 for 5,000 meters; 150 at 14:20 and 33 under 14:00. This figure compares very strongly with US collegiate men from all schools: athletic.net's list of collegiate men 5000 meters in 2009, which lists approximately 400 athletes at 14:40, 200 at 14:20 and 60 under 14:00 in 2009. Stepping up to the 10,000 meter distance, the same sources show that these 19 Tokyo universities list over 190 runners with personal bests under 30:00 (14 more sub 30 minute runners make up an all-star team of runners from other Tokyo universities); about 90 US collegians ran under 30:00 in 2009.

== Winners ==
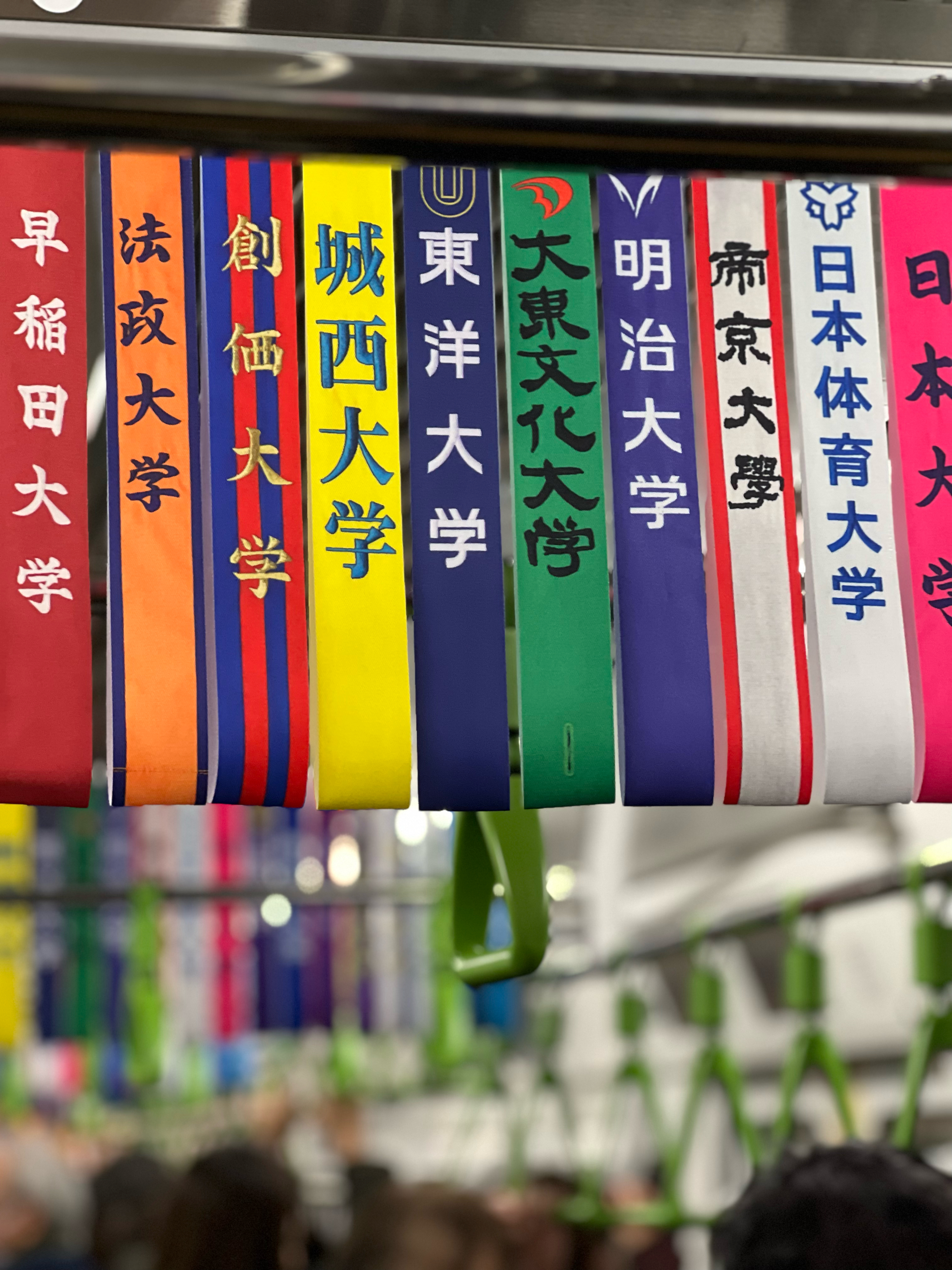
At the end of 2023, promotional materials for participating universities in the Hakone Ekiden will be displayed inside Tokyo's JR Yamanote Line.

Year	Iteration	Winner
1920	1	Tokyo Higher Normal School
1921	2	Meiji University
1922	3	Waseda University
1923	4	Waseda University
1924	5	Meiji University
1925	6	Meiji University
1926	7	Chuo University
1927	8	Waseda University
1928	9	Meiji University
1929	10	Meiji University
1930	11	Waseda University
1931	12	Waseda University
1932	13	Keio University
1933	14	Waseda University
1934	15	Waseda University
1935	16	Nihon University
1936	17	Nihon University
1937	18	Nihon University
1938	19	Nihon University
1939	20	Senshu University
1940	21	Nihon University
1943	22	Nihon University
1947	23	Meiji University
1948	24	Chuo University
1949	25	Meiji University
1950	26	Chuo University
1951	27	Chuo University
1952	28	Waseda University
1953	29	Chuo University
1954	30	Waseda University
1955	31	Chuo University
1956	32	Chuo University
1957	33	Nihon University
1958	34	Nihon University
1959	35	Chuo University
1960	36	Chuo University
1961	37	Chuo University
1962	38	Chuo University
1963	39	Chuo University
1964	40	Chuo University
1965	41	Nihon University
1966	42	Juntendo University
1967	43	Nihon University
1968	44	Nihon University
1969	45	Nippon Sport Science University
1970	46	Nippon Sport Science University
1971	47	Nippon Sport Science University
1972	48	Nippon Sport Science University
1973	49	Nippon Sport Science University
1974	50	Nihon University
1975	51	Daito Bunka University
1976	52	Daito Bunka University
1977	53	Nippon Sport Science University
1978	54	Nippon Sport Science University
1979	55	Juntendo University
1980	56	Nippon Sport Science University
1981	57	Juntendo University
1982	58	Juntendo University
1983	59	Nippon Sport Science University
1984	60	Waseda University
1985	61	Waseda University
1986	61	Juntendo University
1987	63	Juntendo University
1988	64	Juntendo University
1989	65	Juntendo University
1990	66	Daito Bunka University
1991	67	Daito Bunka University
1992	68	Yamanashi Gakuin University
1993	69	Waseda
1994	70	Yamanashi Gakuin University
1995	71	Yamanashi Gakuin University
1996	72	Chuo University
1997	73	Kanagawa University
1998	74	Kanagawa University
1999	75	Juntendo University
2000	76	Komazawa University
2001	77	Juntendo University
2002	78	Komazawa University
2003	79	Komazawa University
2004	80	Komazawa University
2005	81	Komazawa University
2006	82	Asia University
2007	83	Juntendo University
2008	84	Komazawa University
2009	85	Toyo University
2010	86	Toyo University
2011	87	Waseda University
2012	88	Toyo University
2013	89	Nippon Sport Science University
2014	90	Toyo University
2015	91	Aoyama Gakuin University
2016	92	Aoyama Gakuin University
2017	93	Aoyama Gakuin University
2018	94	Aoyama Gakuin University
2019	95	Tokai University
2020	96	Aoyama Gakuin University
2021	97	Komazawa University
2022	98	Aoyama Gakuin University
2023	99	Komazawa University
2024	100	Aoyama Gakuin University
2025	101	Aoyama Gakuin University
2026	102	Aoyama Gakuin University

=== Shizo Kanakuri Trophy ===
This prize is awarded to the most valuable runner. This was founded in 2004(80th) to admire Shizo Kanakuri's accomplishment.

Year	Iteration	Name	Univ
2004	80	Kanegae Yukiharu	IUAU Team (University of Tsukuba)
2005	81	Imai Masato	Juntendo University
2006	82	Imai Masato	Juntendo University
2007	83	Sato Yuki	Tokai University
2007	83	Imai Masato	Juntendo University
2008	84	Shinotou Jun	Chuo Gakuin University
2009	85	Kashiwabara Ryūji	Toyo University
2010	86	Kashiwabara Ryūji	Toyo University
2011	87	Murasawa Akinobu	Tokai University
2012	88	Kashiwabara Ryūji	Toyo University
2013	89	Hattori Shōta	Nippon Sport Science University
2014	90	Ohtsu Kento	Toyo University
2015	91	Kamino Daichi	Aoyama Gakuin University
2016	92	Kubota Kazuma	Aoyama Gakuin University
2017	93	Akiyama Kiyohito	Nippon Sport Science University
2018	94	Hayashi Keisuke	Aoyama Gakuin University
2019	95	Komatsu Yohei	Tokai University
2020	96	Aizawa Akira	Toyo University
2021	97	Vincent Yegon	Tokyo International University
2022	98	Nakamura Yuito	Aoyama Gakuin University
2022	98	Yamato Yoshii	Chuo University
2023	99	Vincent Yegon	Tokyo International University
2024	100	Yamamoto Yuito	Josai University
2025	101	Nomura Akimu	Aoyama Gakuin University
2026	102	Kuroda Asahi	Aoyama Gakuin University

=== Titles ===
University	Title(s)	Year(s)
Chuo University	14	1926, 1948, 1950, 1951, 1953, 1955, 1956, 1959, 1960, 1961, 1962, 1963, 1964, 1996
Waseda University	13	1922, 1923, 1927, 1930, 1931, 1933, 1934, 1952, 1954, 1984, 1985, 1993, 2011
Nihon University	12	1935, 1936, 1937, 1938, 1940, 1943, 1957, 1957, 1965, 1967, 1968, 1974
Juntendo University	11	1966, 1979, 1981, 1982, 1986, 1987, 1989, 1989, 1999, 2001, 2007
Nippon Sport Science University	10	1969, 1970, 1971, 1972, 1973, 1977, 1978, 1980, 1983, 2013
Aoyama Gakuin University	9	2015, 2016, 2017, 2018, 2020, 2022, 2024, 2025, 2026
Komazawa University	8	2000, 2002, 2003, 2004, 2005, 2008, 2021, 2023
Meiji University	7	1921, 1924, 1925, 1928, 1929, 1947, 1949
Daito Bunka University	4	1975, 1976, 1990, 1991
Toyo University	4	2009, 2010, 2012, 2014
Yamanashi Gakuin University	3	1992, 1994, 1995
Kanagawa University	2	1997, 1998
Tokyo Higher Normal School	1	1920
Keio University	1	1932
Senshu University	1	1939
Asia University	1	2006
Tokai University	1	2019

=== Records ===
==== Competition Records ====
Following are the current competition overall records.

Record	Year (Iteration)	University	Time	Distance
Overall	2026 (102)	Aoyama Gakuin	10:37:34	217.1 km
Day 1	2026 (102)	Aoyama Gakuin	5:18:08	107.5 km
Day 2	2026 (102)	Aoyama Gakuin	5:19:26	109.6 km

==== Section Time Records ====
Following are the time record for each of the section from the current course in effect.

Section	Distance	Time	Name	University	Year (iteration)
1	21.3km	1:00:28	Aoki Rui	Kokugakuin University (Senior)	2026 (102)
2	23.1km	1:05:09	Victor Kimutai	Josai (Senior)	2026 (102)
3	21.4km	0:59:25	Vincent Yegon	Tokyo International (Freshman)	2020 (96)
4	20.9km	1:00:00	Vincent Yegon	Tokyo International (Senior)	2023 (99)
5	20.8km	1:07:16	Kuroda Asahi	Aoyama Gakuin (Senior)	2026 (102)
6	20.8km	0:56:47	Nomura Akimu	Aoyama Gakuin (Senior)	2025 (101)
7	21.3km	1:00:43	Satō Keita	Komazawa (Junior)	2025 (101)
8	21.4km	1:03:46	Shiode Shōta	Aoyama Gakuin (Senior)	2026 (102)
9	23.1km	1:07:15	Nakamura Yuito	Aoyama Gakuin (Junior)	2022 (98)
10	23.0km	1:07:31	Satō Keita	Komazawa (Senior)	2026(102)

==== Overtake Records ====
Place	Overtakes	Name	University	Year (Iteration/Section)
1	20	Daniel Gitau	Nihon University	2009 (85/2)
2	17	Akinobu Murasawa	Tokai University	2011 (87/2)
3	15	Takuro Nakagawa	Juntendo University	2003 (79/2)
3	15	Daniel Gitau	Nihon Univ	2008 (84/2)
5	14	Vincent Yegon	Tokyo International University	2021 (97/2)
5	14	Hibiki Yoshida	Soka University	2025 (101/2)

== Triple Crown ==
Winning the previous year's Izumo Ekiden and the All Japan University Ekiden at the same time is awarded the Triple Crown.

Univ	Year
Daito Bunka University	1990-91
Juntendo University	2000-01
Waseda University	2010-11
Aoyama Gakuin University	2016-17
Komazawa University	2022-23

== In popular culture ==
Hakone was featured in various books, manga, anime and live-action films and series, usually those series narrates the build-up and training of a team to run the Hakone Ekiden, as well people envolved such as fans and TV staff; some exemples include:

- Run with the Wind - a 2006 Japanese novel by Shion Miura. It has also been adapted to manga, live action film and anime.
- Our Hakone Ekiden - a 2024 Japanese novel by Jun Ikeido. It has also been adapted to live action drama for Nippon Television in 2026.

== See also ==
- Izumo Ekiden
- All Japan University Ekiden
