= Japan Collegiate Ekiden Championships =

The collegiate ekiden championships in Japan are held for women and for men. The women's championship is in late October and the men's championship is in early November. These dates are relatively early in the ekiden season, with several other major races in subsequent months.

== All-Japan Collegiate Women's Ekiden Championship (Morinomiyako Ekiden) ==
The annual All-Japan Collegiate Women's Ekiden Championship, begun in 1981 and also called Morinomiyako Ekiden, is held in Sendai Miyage Prefecture at the end of October. It is a 6-stage, 38.6 kilometer race from Miyagi Track and Field Grounds to Sendai City Hall. Video showing Sendai course and terrain. The race is broadcast nationwide from Sendai on Nihon Television broadcast home page (in Japanese). 2009 Preview in English, 2010 Results in English, 2011 Results in English, 2011 Results in Japanese.

Women's National University Ekiden Championships 38.6 km - Stage Winners
	First stage 5.8 km	Second stage 6.8 km	Third stage 9.1 km	Fourth stage 4.9 km	Fifth stage 4.0 km	Sixth stage 8.0 km
2010	Chinami Mori; Bukkyo Univ. 18:24	Risa Takenaka; Ritsumeikan Univ. 21:30	Kasumi Nishihara; Bukkyo Univ. 28:56 - CR	Rika Kawashima; Bukkyo Univ. 15:24	Akane Yabushita; Ritsumeikan Univ. 12:38 - CR	Hikari Yoshimoto; Bukkyo Univ. 25:14 - CR
2011	Risa Takenaka; Ritsumeikan Univ. 18:16 - CR	Akane Yabushita; Ritsumeikan Univ. 22:26	Hikari Yoshimoto; Bukkyo Univ. 30:06	Mutsumi Ikeda; Ritsumeikan Univ. 15:20	Chinami Mori; Bukkyo Univ. 12:56	Eri Yagi; Meijo Univ. 26:21

Women's National University Ekiden Championships - Top 6 teams automatically seeded for next year
	First Place	Second Place	Third Place	Fourth Place	Fifth Place	Sixth Place	Seventh Place	Eight Place	Ninth Place	Tenth Place
2010 28th	Bukkyo Univ. 2:02:44 - CR	Ritsumeikan Univ. 2:04:20	Meijo Univ. 2:08:00	Matsuyama Univ. 2:08:55	Josai Univ. 2:09:18	Kanoya Taiku Univ. 2:10:39	Josai Kokusai Univ. 2:10:43	Osaka Gakuin Univ. 2:10:56	Hakuo Univ. 2:11:16	Fukuoka Univ. 2:11:19
2011 29th	Ritsumeikan Univ. 2:06:29	Bukkyo Univ. 2:07:47	Meijo Univ. 2:07:58	Kyoto Sangyo Univ. 2:11:00	Matsuyama Univ. 2:11:15					

== All-Japan Collegiate (Men's) Ekiden Championship ==
On the first Sunday of November, the men compete in the 8 stage, 106.8 kilometer National Collegiate Ekiden Championship in Aichi and Mie Prefectures. This race is the second of the season's big three, the first being the Izumo Ekiden and the last being the Hakone Ekiden. Here, 27 teams battle for the national title. The race starts in front of Atsuta Shrine in Nagoya City and then proceeds out of the city, along the coast and 106.8 kilometers later to Ise Grand Shrine in Ise, Mie Prefecture. Two versions of the course map are available: the meet website's own map, and TV Asahi's google map version. TV Asahi provides 2011 video highlights.

The top six teams in the race are automatically seeded for the following year's race. Other teams must qualify in a series of June track meets featuring 10,000 meter races. Kanto Region qualifier

The 2011 (43rd) race featured defending national champion and course record holder Waseda University and Izumo winner and eventual Hakone Ekiden winner Toyo University. However, on this day Komazawa University won, taking its 9th national title is 17 years. Toyo University's anchor Ryuji Kashiwabara almost made up the 1:40 deficit over 19.7 km but came up half a minute short - English meet summary.

Men's National University Ekiden Championships - Stage Winners
	First stage 14.6 km	Second stage 13.2 km	Third stage 9.5 km	Fourth stage 14.0 km	Fifth stage 11.6 km	Sixth stage 12.3 km	Seventh stage 11.9 km	Eighth stage 19.7 km
2010	Keita Shitara; Toyo Univ. 42:42	Tetsuya Yoroizaka; Meiji Univ. 37:38 CR	Ikuto Yufu; Komazawa Univ. 27:02 CR	Hiroyuki Sasaki; Waseda Univ. 40:23	Fuminori Shikata; Waseda Univ. 33:47 CR	Shinobu Kubota; Komazawa Univ. 36:03	Akinori Iida; Komazawa Univ. 35:09	Benjamin Gando; Nihon Univ. 56:42
2011	Hirotaka Tamura; Nihon Univ. 43:38	Takehiro Deki; Aoyama Gakuin Univ. 37:43	Ikuto Yufu; Komazawa Univ. 27:13	Wataru Ueno; Komazawa Univ. 40:56	Kazuhiro Kuga; Komazawa Univ. 34:15	Kenji Yamamoto; Toyo Univ. 36:22	Taichi Takase; Komazawa Univ. 35:23	Ryuji Kashiwabara; Toyo Univ. 57:48

Men's National University Ekiden Championships Team Finish from Nagoya to Ise 106.8 km- Top 6 Automatically seeded for the next year
	First Place	Second Place	Third Place	Fourth Place	Fifth Place	Sixth Place	Seventh Place	Eight Place	Ninth Place	Tenth Place	Eleventh Place
2010	Waseda Univ. 5:13:02 CR	Komazawa Univ. 5:15:22	Toyo Univ. 5:16:21	Nihon Univ. 5:19:18	Tokai Univ. 5:19:45	Meiji Univ. 5:19:52	Nittai Univ. 5:20:00	Chuo Univ. 5:20:32	Yamanashi Gakuin Univ. 5:21:05	Teikyo Univ. 5:22:04	
2011	Komazawa Univ. 5:15:46	Toyo Univ. 5:16:19	Waseda Univ. 5:21:06	Nihon Univ. 5:21:54	Chuo Univ. 5:22:21	Jobu Univ. 5:23:44	Tokai Univ. 5:24:26	Meiji Univ. 5:26:22	Aoyama Gakuin Univ. 5:27:55	Josai Univ. 5:30:55	Teikyo Univ. 5:31:32

=== Summary ===
Univ	title(s)	Year
Komazawa University	15	1998,1999,2001,2002,2004,2006,2007,2008,2011,2012,2013,2014,2020,2021,2022
Nippon Sport Science University	11	1970,1971,1972,1977,1978,1980,1983,1985,1987,1988,1988
Daito Bunka University	7	1973,1974,1975,1976,1984,1989,1990
Waseda University	5	1992,1993,1994,1995,2010
Fukuoka University	3	1979,1981,1982
Nihon University	3	1991,2005,2009
Kanagawa University	3	1996,1997,2017
Tokai University	2	2003,2019
Aoyama Gakuin University	2	2016,2018
Kyoto Sangyo University	1	1986
Juntendo University	1	2000
Toyo University	1	2015

=== Record ===
- From 2018 the distance of each course has been changed.

Place	distance	Record holder	Univ	Time	Year
1	9.5km	Peter Wanjiru	Daito Bunka Univ	26:58	2022
2	11.1km	Keita Sato	Komazawa Univ	31:01	2023
3	11.9km	Vincent Yegon	Tokyo Kokusai Univ	32:46	2021
4	11.8km	Asahi Kuroda	Aoyama Gakuin Univ	33:03	2024
5	12.4km	Hibiki Yoshida	Soka Univ	35:18	2023
6	12.8km	Ayumu Yamamoto	Kokugakuin Univ	36:47	2024
7	17.6km	Ren Tazawa	Komazawa Univ	49:38	2022
8	19.7km	Mekubo Mogusu	Nihon Univ	55:32	2007

=== Triple crown ===
Winning the Izumo Ekiden and the next year's Hakone Ekiden at the same time is called the Triple Crown, and 5 teams have achieved it in the past.

Univ	Year
Daito Bunka University	1990-91
Juntendo University	2000-01
Waseda University	2010-11
Aoyama Gakuin University	2016-17
Komazawa University	2022-23

== See also ==
- Relay race
- Cross country running
- Nike Team Nationals
- Middle distance track event
