= The Great Passage (TV series) =

Television anime

- Anime visual

舟を編む (Fune o Amu)
- Serial novel
- Written by: Shion Miura
- Illustrated by: Haruko Kumota
- Published by: Kobunsha
- Imprint: Kobunsha; Kobunsha Bunko
- Magazine: Classy
- Original run: September 28, 2009 – May 28, 2011
- Volumes: 1
- Manga
- Written by: Shion Miura
- Illustrated by: Haruko Kumota
- Published by: Kodansha
- Magazine: Itan
- Original run: October 7, 2016 – October 6, 2017
- Volumes: 2
- Anime television series
- Directed by: Toshimasa Kuroyanagi
- Produced by: Akitoshi Mori; Sōichirō Umemoto
- Written by: Takuya Satō
- Music by: Yoshihiro Ike
- Studio: Zexcs
- Licensed by: Amazon Prime Video (expired); NA: Discotek Media
- Original network: Fuji TV (Noitamina)
- Original run: October 14, 2016 – December 23, 2016
- Episodes: 11
- Television drama

Fune o Amu ~Watashi, Jisho Tsukurimasu~
- Directed by: Manabu Asou; Renpei Tsukamoto
- Written by: Naomi Hiruta
- Music by: Face 2 fake
- Original network: NHK BS, NHK BS Premium 4K
- Original run: February 18, 2024 – April 21, 2024
- Episodes: 10

The Great Passage (Japanese: 舟を編む, Hepburn: Fune o Amu; Weaving a Ship) is a 2016 Japanese anime television series animated by Zexcs, adapted from the novel written by Shion Miura. The series was directed by Toshimasa Kuroyanagi and written by Takuya Satō, featuring original character designs by Haruko Kumota, adapted character designs by Hiroyuki Aoyama and music by Yoshihiro Ike. The anime aired between October and December 2016 on Fuji TV's Noitamina block. A live-action television drama adaptation aired from February to April 2024.

== Plot ==
The publication of a new dictionary called The Great Passage is being constructed. Mitsuya Majime, originally from publisher Genbu Publishing's sales department, has been recruited by the retiring editor of the dictionary department Kouhei Araki, to succeed him due to his love and dedication to reading. The dictionary department is known internally as the "money-eating insect" (loss making), but Mitsuya uses his perseverance and attachment to the words to become a great editor.

== Characters ==
Mitsuya Majime (馬締 光也, Majime Mitsuya)
Voiced by: Takahiro Sakurai
Portrayed by: Yojiro Noda
Majime is the main protagonist. He is a salesman for Genbu until Araki transfers him to the Dictionary Editorial Department. He is a bookworm and has a hard time expressing his feelings, though he does make a conscious effort of learning how to. He has feelings for Kaguya, which is why he writes a confession letter for her and asks Nishioka to advise him regarding it. After the time skip, it is revealed that he has married her and has become the Chief Editor of the Dictionary Editorial Department.
Masashi Nishioka (西岡 正志, Nishioka Misashi)
Voiced by: Hiroshi Kamiya
Nishioka is a good-looking and friendly guy who is one of the editors at the Dictionary Editorial Department, before he gets transferred to the PR Department. When he first meets Majime, he thinks that the latter is weird, but when they start working together, they come to realize that their strengths complement each other. They eventually become best friends. After the time skip, it is revealed that he has become the chief of the PR Department, and that he regularly tries to help out the Dictionary Editorial Department to make "The Great Passage" a success.
Kaguya Hayashi (林 香具矢, Hayashi Kaguya)
Voiced by: Maaya Sakamoto
Kaguya is the granddaughter of Take, Majime's landlord. She is training to become a Japanese chef and responds favourably when Majime confesses to her. After the time skip, it is revealed that she has married Majime and now owns her restaurant.
Kōhei Araki (荒木 公平, Araki Kōhei)
Voiced by: Tetsuo Kanao
He is the former Chief of the Dictionary Editorial Department who has decided to retire due to his wife's illness. He swears to Matsumoto-sensei that he would find someone worthy to take his place, and after he brings Majime in, Matsumoto-sensei and he find Majime to be exactly that. He keeps mentoring Majime and becomes a part-time employee.
Kaoru Sasaki (佐々木 薫, Sasaki Kaoru)
Voiced by: Yoshiko Sakakibara
Sasaki is the secretary of the Dictionary Editorial Department. She is a mild-mannered woman, who continues to support the editors at the department.
Midori Kishibe (岸辺 みどり, Kishibe Midori)
Voiced by: Yōko Hikasa
Portrayed by: Elaiza Ikeda
Kishibe is a character who is introduced after the time skip. She is transferred from the Northern Black Editorial Team, and at first finds it difficult to adjust to her new role and environment. But with Nishioka's help, she manages that, and also contributes to the completion and publication of "The Great Passage".
Remi Miyoshi (三好 麗美, Miyoshi Remi)
Voiced by: Chiwa Saitō
Miyoshi works at the PR Department, and is secretly in a relationship with Nishioka, with whom she also went to High School. After the time skip, it is revealed that she has married him (which now makes her Remi Nishioka) and they have two daughters together.
Tomosuke Matsumoto (松本 朋佑, Matsumoto Tomosuke)
Voiced by: Mugihito
Matsumoto, or Matsumoto-sensei as he is called by the others, is a professor who serves in an advisory capacity for the compilation of "The Great Passage" at the Dictionary Editorial Department at Genbu. He is a wise and kindhearted man who also loves learning new words, which he writes down in a notebook he carries with him at all times.
Take (タケ, Take)
Voiced by: Ikuko Tani
Take is Majime's landlord and Kaguya's grandmother. She is a gentle soul who often stays up late only to converse with Majime and offer him dinner.

== Media ==
=== Manga ===
A manga adaptation illustrated by Haruko Kumota was serialized in Kodansha's Itan magazine from October 7, 2016, to October 7, 2017.

=== Anime ===
The series was produced by Fuji TV, Aniplex, Kyoraku Industrial Holdings, Kansai Telecasting Corporation, Kobunsha, Dentsu, and Zexcs. It premiered in the Noitamina programming block on Fuji TV on October 14, 2016, and finished airing on December 23, 2016, with a total of 11 episodes. The opening theme was "Shiokaze" (潮風, Shiokaze; lit. 'Tide Wind') by Taiiku Okazaki, and the ending theme was "I&I" by Leola. Amazon simulcasted the series on their Amazon Video service. The series was released on two home video volumes on January and March 22, 2017, respectively; the first volume contains episodes 1 to 7, and the second volume contains episode 8 to 11.

==== Episode list ====
No.	Title	Directed by	Written by	Original release date
1	"Vastness"; Transliteration: "Bōyō" (Japanese: 茫洋)	Toshimasa Kuroyanagi	Takuya Satō	October 14, 2016 (Note: The series premiered on Fuji TV's Noitamina block on October 13, 2016 at 24:55 JST, which is effectively October 14, 2016 at 12:55 am.)
2	"Encounter"; Transliteration: "Hōchaku" (Japanese: 逢着)	Seishirō Nagaya	Toshimasa Kuroyanagi	October 21, 2016
3	"Love"; Transliteration: "Koi" (Japanese: 恋)	Miwa Sasaki	Noriko Toda	October 28, 2016
4	"Steady Progress"; Transliteration: "Zenshin" (Japanese: 漸進)	Shinobu Tagashira	Yūichirō Kido	November 4, 2016
5	"Waver"; Transliteration: "Tayutau" (Japanese: 揺蕩う)	Tatsumi Fujii	Toshizō Nemoto	November 11, 2016
6	"Resonance"; Transliteration: "Kyōshin" (Japanese: 共振)	Seishirō Nagaya	Toshizō Nemoto	November 18, 2016
7	"Trust"; Transliteration: "Shinrai" (Japanese: 信頼)	Fumiaki Kōta	Yūichirō Kido	November 25, 2016
8	"Compile"; Transliteration: "Amu" (Japanese: 編む)	Midori Yui	Noriko Toda	December 2, 2016
9	"Course"; Transliteration: "Chishio" (Japanese: 血潮)	Miwa Sasaki	Noriko Toda	December 9, 2016
10	"Pride"; Transliteration: "Kinji" (Japanese: 矜持)	Seishirō Nagaya	Yūichirō Kido	December 16, 2016
11	"Light"; Transliteration: "Akari" (Japanese: 灯)	Toshimasa Kuroyanagi	Takuya Satō	December 23, 2016

=== Drama ===
On October 31, 2023, a live-action television drama adaptation was announced. The drama was directed by Manabu Asou and Renpei Tsukamoto, with scripts written by Naomi Hiruta and music composed by Face 2 fake. Ten episodes were aired on NHK's NHK BS and NHK BS Premium 4K channels from February 18 to April 21, 2024.
