= The Easy Life in Kamusari =

2009 novel by Shion Miura

- Author: Shion Miura
- Original title: 神去なあなあ日常
- Translator: Juliet Winters Carpenter
- Language: Japanese
- Series: Forest
- Genre: Bildungsroman
- Publisher: Tokuma Shoten
- Publication date: 2009
- Publication place: Japan
- English publication date: 2021
- Pages: 208
- ISBN: 9781542027151
- OCLC: 1237633352
- Followed by: Kamusari Tales Told at Night

The Easy Life in Kamusari (Japanese: 神去なあなあ日常, Hepburn: Kamusari Nānā Nichijō) is a 2009 novel by Shion Miura. It follows Yuki Hirano, a city native, as he works a forestry job in a remote mountain area. A movie adaptation (Wood Job!) premiered in 2014. The novel was translated into English by Juliet Winters Carpenter in 2021.

== Synopsis ==
Yuki Hirano, recently graduated from high school, finds himself signed up for forestry work by his parents. Traveling to work in the remote village of Kamusari is difficult in many ways for Yuki, who was born and raised in the city; a new coworker even takes Yuki's cell phone and disposes of the battery.

Over the course of a year, the young man comes to appreciate the meticulous process of taking care of the trees and the environment around him.

== Characters ==
- Yuki Hirano (平野 勇気, Hirano Yūki) - a young man from Yokohama, disillusioned with life and unexpectedly signed up for forestry work in mountainous, remote, forested Kamusari.
- Nao (直紀, Naoki) - a local schoolteacher in the village, and younger sister of Risa. She has a crush on Seiichi (her sister's husband).
- Yoki Iida (飯田 与喜, Iida Yoki) - an employee of Nakamura Lumber, in Kamusari. He has bleached blond hair and a sense of humor. Yoki's wife is Miho (みき, Miki); their relationship is tempestuous but loving. They live with Granny Shige (繁), Yoki's grandmother. Yoki also owns a loyal dog named Noko (ノコ) .
- Iwao Tanabe (田辺 巌, Tanabe Iwao) - an employee of Nakamura Lumber, in Kamusari. He is experienced and patient with teaching Yuki.
- Saburo Koyama (小山 三郎, Koyama Saburo) - nicknamed "Old Man Saburo," he is an older employee of Nakamura Lumber, in Kamusari. He is a neighbour of the Iidas.
- Seiichi Nakamura (中村 清一, Nakamura Seiichi) - the friendly head of Nakamura Lumber. His wife, Risa (祐子, Yuko), is the older sister of Nao. Risa and Seiichi's son is named Santa (山太).
