= Wood Job! =

2014 Japanese film by Shinobu Yaguchi

- Theatrical release poster
- Directed by: Shinobu Yaguchi
- Written by: Shinobu Yaguchi
- Based on: Kamusari nānā Nichijō by Shion Miura
- Starring: Shota Sometani; Masami Nagasawa; Hideaki Itō
- Cinematography: Akiko Ashizawa
- Edited by: Ryūji Miyajima
- Music by: Takuji Nomura
- Production companies: Asahi Shimbun; Chubu-Nippon Broadcasting; Chugoku Broadcasting; Django Film; Hakuhodo DY Media Partners; Hokkaido Broadcasting; Mainichi Broadcasting System; Nikkatsu; RKB Mainichi Broadcasting; Shizuoka Broadcasting System; Toho; Tohoku Broadcasting Company; Tokuma Shoten; Tokyo Broadcasting System
- Distributed by: Toho
- Release date: 10 May 2014 (Japan)
- Running time: 116 minutes
- Country: Japan
- Language: Japanese
- Box office: ¥107 million (Japan)

Wood Job! (Japanese: WOOD JOB!〜神去なあなあ日常〜, Hepburn: Wood Job!~Kamusari nānā Nichijō~) is a 2014 Japanese comedy film written and directed by Shinobu Yaguchi and based on the novel The Easy Life in Kamusari (神去なあなあ日常, Kamusari nānā Nichijō) by Shion Miura. The film stars Shota Sometani, Masami Nagasawa, and Hideaki Itō. The main theme song is "Happiest Fool", sung by Maia Hirasawa. The film was released on 10 May 2014, and made its North American premiere at LA Eigafest 2014.

== Plot ==
After failing his university entrance examinations and being dumped by his girlfriend, Yuki Hirano decides to join a forestry training program after seeing an attractive young woman on a promotional pamphlet. The program immediately proves difficult for him, with many other trainees dropping out. When he is informed that the young woman on the leaflet is only a model, Yuki quickly decides to quit but spots the girl from the pamphlet before doing so; she does in fact live in the area, but is uninterested in him when she realises that he only signed up for her. A smitten Yuki decided to continue, taking it upon himself to work harder and keep at the job. He faces many early obstacles, including a broken cellphone, a cut on his hand, leech bites, and more, but ultimately perseveres.

Under the mentorship of his strict, hard-working superior Yoki Iida, Yuki slowly but surely improves at his forest job. All the while, he pursues the girl from the pamphlet whose beauty motivated him in the first place. He eventually learns her name is Naoki and that she recently left a relationship. Naoki works part-time at a school, and Yuki goes to see her one day. He winds up playing with the schoolchildren alongside Naoki, getting closer to her.

Initially being skeptical of the newcomer, as Yuki opens his eyes to life outside a big city and learns respect for the forest and villagers, most townsfolk grow to like him and accept him as one of their own. With the Onbashira Festival right around the corner, a town meeting is held. Some of the elders disapprove of having Yuki attend given that he's still new to the village and therefore not a real "mountain man" yet, but to his surprise, Yoki adamantly sticks up for him.

After an incident where Yuki finds one of her students who went missing in the forest, Naoki gradually begins to care a lot for him. Just as the town begins their festivities, Yuki gets a call from his mother back home. She anticipates him returning home soon, but he hangs up on her, not wanting to think about going back yet. Yuki goes up to the mountain with the other men for a traditional forest ritual, where they say a prayer before chopping down the largest tree on the mountaintop. Yuki accidentally gets his leg caught on a rope that is tied to the tree and is forced to ride the tree as it falls down the mountain, using techniques he learned at his job to keep himself safe. The tree reaches the bottom of the mountain and the townspeople celebrate as they crowd around Yuki.

The final day of his program arrives, and Yuki gives a tearful farewell to Yoki and his family who gave him a place to stay. As he boards the train home, Naoki shows up just in time to say good-bye. Yuki returns to his house, but can't actually bring himself to knock on the door and greet his parents. He instead wanders the streets and finds himself drawn to a house construction site, where he takes in the smell of wood with a smile on his face. Yuki is next seen on a train going toward the mountains, happily returning to the forest village he believes is his true home.

A post-credit scene reveals the new promotional pamphlet the forestry program is now using, which depicts an experienced Yuki at work.

== Cast ==
The following people appear in the film.

- Shota Sometani as Yūki Hirano
- Masami Nagasawa as Naoki Ishii
- Hideaki Itō as Yoki Iida
- Yūka as Miki Iida
- Naomi Nishida as Yūko Nakamura
- Sports Makita as Iwao Tanabe
- Masashi Arifuku as Saburō Koyama
- Yoshimasa Kondo as a senior executive director of forestry association
- Ken Mitsuishi as Seiichi Nakamura
- Akira Emoto as Toshirō Yamane
- Yuki Furukawa

== Production ==
The film was shot on location in the mountains of Mie Prefecture, taking approximately six weeks and completed by 31 July 2013.

== Reception ==
The film has grossed ¥107 million in Japan.
