= Run with the Wind =

Japanese novel

- The cover of the first edition, published in 2006

風が強く吹いている (Kaze ga Tsuyoku Fuiteiru)
- Novel
- Written by: Shion Miura
- Published by: Shinchosha
- English publisher: NA: HarperCollins
- Published: September 22, 2006
- Manga
- Written by: Shion Miura
- Illustrated by: Sorata Unno
- Published by: Shueisha
- Magazine: Weekly Young Jump (2007–2008); Monthly Young Jump (2008–2009)
- Original run: October 18, 2007 – November 17, 2009
- Volumes: 6
- Live-action film
- Released: October 2009
- Anime television series
- Directed by: Kazuya Nomura
- Written by: Kohei Kiyasu
- Music by: Yuki Hayashi
- Studio: Production I.G
- Licensed by: NA: Sentai Filmworks
- Original network: NTV, SDT, YTV, BS NTV
- Original run: October 2, 2018 – March 26, 2019
- Episodes: 23
- icon

Run with the Wind (Japanese: 風が強く吹いている, Hepburn: Kaze ga Tsuyoku Fuiteiru) is a 2006 Japanese novel by Shion Miura. The novel has received a manga and a live-action film adaptation, as well as an anime television series adaptation produced by Production I.G that aired from October 2018 to March 2019.

== Synopsis ==
Kakeru, a former elite runner at high school, is chased for stealing food. He is saved by a Kansei University student named Haiji, who is also a runner. Haiji persuades Kakeru to live in the old dormitory "Chikusei-so" where he plans to team up with fellow residents to enter the Hakone Ekiden relay marathon, one of the most prominent university races in Japan. Kakeru soon finds out that all of the residents except for Haiji and himself are complete novices.

== Characters ==
Kakeru Kurahara (蔵原走, Kurahara Kakeru)
Voiced by: Takeo Ōtsuka (Japanese); Gabriel Regojo (English)
Kakeru is a 1st year sociology student at Kansei University Student and an experienced runner. A prodigious athlete since high school, he became disillusioned due to an incident on his old Track and Field team. He first joined Chikusei-so after Haiji meets him stealing from a convenience store. Over the course of the story, Kakeru learns the meaning of running together with others.
Haiji Kiyose (清瀬灰二, Kiyose Haiji)
Voiced by: Toshiyuki Toyonaga (Japanese); Blake Jackson (English)
Haiji is a 4th year Kansei University Student and a long time resident of Chikusei-so. He has dreams of running in the Hakone Ekiden with a team and slowly built up one of at-first unwilling acquaintances at the dorm. Despite recovering from a knee injury, Haiji remains one of the most enthusiastic residents and coach of the group.
Takashi Sugiyama (杉山高志, Sugiyama Takashi)
Voiced by: Koki Uchiyama (Japanese); Daniel Regojo (English)
Known as 'Shindo' to the other members of the dorm. Generally considered an honor student by the other residents of Chikusei-so, Takashi is an earnest student from the mountain regions. He was the first convinced by Haiji to give running a chance and has been a significant driving force behind the others. His dedication towards training originally stemmed from wanting to inspire and impress his family, but eventually became something entirely his own.
Akane Kashiwazaki (柏崎茜, Kashiwazaki Akane)
Voiced by: Miyu Irino (Japanese); Mike Haimoto (English)
Nicknamed 'Prince' by the other dorm members, Akane is a manga enthusiast with his room filled to the brim with various volumes. He began as one of the most reluctant and slowest members due to his lack of physical stamina and indoor tendencies. Akane picked up his training after Takashi had his family send over a treadmill for him to remain indoors to read manga. After finding true inspiration from his friends at Chikusei-so and Kakeru's presence, he pushes himself beyond his limitations.
Tarō Jō (城太郎, Jō Tarō)
Voiced by: Junya Enoki (Japanese); Scott Gibbs (English)
The older of the Jō twins. He goes by Jota and is nearly indistinguishable from his younger brother. The two think and act in tandem. Though he was originally driven by the intention to attract girls through running, Jota came to appreciate the sport.
Jirō Jō (城次郎, Jō Jirō)
Voiced by: Yūto Uemura (Japanese); Nathan Wilson (English)
The younger of the Jō twins. He goes by Joji and appears almost the exact same as his elder brother. Originally intending to run for the sake of becoming popular with girls, he realize that running was something enjoyable in itself.
Yukihiko Iwakura (岩倉雪彦, Iwakura Yukihiko)
Voiced by: Kazuyuki Okitsu (Japanese); Benjamin McLaughlin (English)
Known as 'Yuki' by the other members of Chikusei-so, he passed the bar examination on his first try. Yuki was initially reluctant to run and was bent on defying Haiji's enthusiasm, but eventually got drawn into it as the others members did. He hates the smell of tobacco coming from Akihiro's smoking until he quit for running.
Musa Kamala (ムサ・カマラ, Musa Kamara)
Voiced by: Hideaki Kabumoto (Japanese); Jovan Jackson (English)
Musa is a native to Tanzania. He moved to Japan to study Space and Engineering as a sponsored international student at Kansei University. His Japanese still has flaws leading to some misunderstandings and written mistakes. Kind and earnest, Musa is always supportive of his other team members and is well known by the residents of the local shopping district.
Yōhei Sakaguchi (坂口洋平, Sakaguchi Yōhei)
Voiced by: Riki Kitazawa (Japanese); Andrew Love (English)
Known as 'King' due to his love of trivia, Yohei is a 4th year Sociology student at Kansei University. Besides his nightly trivia marathons, he's generally preoccupied by job hunting to no avail. Yohei eventually relented and joined in the team's efforts due to the earnest words of Takashi.
Akihiro Hirata (平田彰宏, Hirata Akihiro)
Voiced by: Takanori Hoshino (Japanese); Ty Mahany (English)
Known as 'Nico-senpai' due to his habit of smoking. Prior to entering Kansei University, he ran Track during high school but quit due to his coach. As Akihiro picked up running again under Haiji's influence, he stopped smoking and began to make small metallic figures as a substitute.
Hanako Katsuta (勝田葉菜子, Katsuta Hanako)
Voiced by: Juri Kimura (Japanese); Alyssa Marek (English)
Known as Hana-chan to the members of Chikusei-so, she is a 3rd year high school student and daughter of one of the shop owners in the local shopping district. At Haiji's request, Hanako rode her bike alongside the team and also times their runs. She's become well known for her terrible cooking.
Kōsuke Sakaki (榊浩介, Sakaki Kōsuke)
Voiced by: Kengo Kawanishi (Japanese); Tyler Galindo (English)
Sakaki was a member of Kakeru's high school Track and Field team. He developed an eternal grudge towards Kakeru after causing an incident that affected their entire team.
Kazuma Fujioka (藤岡一真, Fujioka Kazuma)
Voiced by: Satoshi Hino
Kazuma is a running prodigy and famous among intercollegiate track meets and races. He knew Haiji prior to his knee injury and becomes a target for Kakeru to defeat.
Genichirō Tazaki (田崎源一郎, Tazaki Gen'ichirō)
Voiced by: Kotarou Nakamura (Japanese); James Belcher (English)
Genichiro is the landlord of Chikusei-so and the official coach of the team. However, he leaves most of the work to Haiji and his enthusiasm.

== Media ==
=== Novel ===
The novel was written by Shion Miura, and Shinchosha published it on September 22, 2006. Shinchosha published a second edition of the novel on July 1, 2009. In January 2024, HarperCollins announced that they will release the novel in English.

=== Manga ===
A manga adaptation by Sorata Unno launched in Shueisha's seinen manga magazine Weekly Young Jump on October 18, 2007. It moved to Monthly Young Jump in 2008, where it ran until November 17, 2009.

No.	Japanese release date	Japanese ISBN
1	March 19, 2008	978-4088774121
2	June 19, 2008	978-4088774640
3	September 19, 2008	978-4088775067
4	December 19, 2008	978-4088775692
5	June 19, 2009	978-4088776668
6	December 18, 2009	978-4088777559

=== Live-action film ===
A live-action film adaptation premiered in October 2009.

=== Anime ===
An anime television series adaptation premiered from October 2, 2018, to March 26, 2019, and was broadcast on NTV, SDT, YTV and BS NTV. The series is directed by Kazuya Nomura and written by Kohei Kiyasu, with animation by Production I.G. The series' character designs are provided by Takahiro Chiba and the music is composed by Yuki Hayashi. It aired for 23 episodes, and Crunchyroll simulcasted the series. The series is licensed by Sentai Filmworks for streaming and home video release.

An English dub of the series was confirmed by Sentai on November 16, 2019.

No.	Title (Note: All English titles are taken from Crunchyroll.)	Original release date
1	"The 10th Man"; Transliteration: "10 Hitome no Otoko" (Japanese: 10人目の男)	October 2, 2018
Kurahara Kakeru runs through the city streets at night. A single man chases after him on a bicycle. That man's name is Kiyose Haiji. When Haiji catches up to Kakeru, he asks him a question: "Hey, do you like running?" Led by Haiji, Kakeru arrives at the Chikusei-so student dorm. He meets the strange residents living there. Haiji behaves in a peremptory manner. Kakeru is bewildered by the sudden development. No one at the dorm is aware of Haiji's ulterior motive. That night, the residents hold a welcoming party for Kakeru. At the party, from Haiji's mouth comes a grand and reckless plan.
2	"The Ogre's Arrival"; Transliteration: "Oni ga Kirite" (Japanese: 鬼が来りて)	October 9, 2018
The residents of the Chikusei-so will run in the Hakone Ekiden together. Kakeru responds strongly to Haiji's rash suggestion. All the residents are amateurs when it comes to long distance running. Nobody takes Haiji's words seriously. The residents attempt to carry on with their college lives, but Haiji's shadow approaches. Threatened by Haiji's mysterious pressure, several tragically fall to Haiji's hand. Kakeru tries to leave the Chikusei-so, but he runs into Nico-chan in the city. Meanwhile, the Chikusei-so's bath breaks for unknown reasons, and they decide to go to the "hellish" public bath instead.
3	"A Single Flower"; Transliteration: "Hana, Ichirin" (Japanese: 花、一輪)	October 16, 2018
When their hot water contest ends in a tie, Kakeru participates in the dorm's morning jogs while continuing to rebel against Haiji. His plan is to make the other residents give up. The next morning, several of the residents decide to boycott the jogging. A young girl wearing a school uniform runs up to Kakeru and his cool attitude. Hana-chan is introduced to the team. Kakeru's old high school teammate, Sakaki, appears.
4	"Shadows That Don't Fade"; Transliteration: "Kienai Kage" (Japanese: 消えない影)	October 24, 2018
"It's been a while..." Sakaki smirks fearlessly. He and Kakeru are old acquaintances. Kakeru is unable to hide how shaken he is by their unexpected reunion. Swirling inside Kakeru was the loneliness he experienced as a high school student due to his talents. Kakeru runs as though fleeing from shadows, when before him appears "the other Kakeru." It is the desperate man he used to be before he met Haiji. Kakeru glares resentfully at his past. Just as he's about to lose hope in himself, someone with a kind voice reaches out to him. It's Prince and his friends.
5	"The Ones Not Chosen"; Transliteration: "Eraba Rezaru Mono-tachi" (Japanese: 選ばれざる者たち)	October 30, 2018
After being challenged by Tokyo Sport University's Sakaki, Kakeru and the other residents of Chikusei-so have grown closer. As they celebrate the renewal of their resolve, King comes home wearing a suit for a change. Meanwhile, Kakeru voices his objections to participating in a track meet so soon. What point is there in forcing the amateurish residents to face reality? In response to Kakeru, Haiji asks his own question. Kakeru's doubts remain unresolved as Haiji begins holding proper practices. However, King refuses to participate because he's busy looking for a job. Under a cloud of anxiety, their proper training begins.
6	"The Emperor's New Clothes"; Transliteration: "Hadaka no Ōsama" (Japanese: 裸の王様)	November 6, 2018
King rebels against Haiji's escalating demands. His job search continues to go poorly, causing him to close himself off to even Shindo, who is concerned for him. Eventually King begins acting independently. The other residents are also unable to hide their befuddlement at being told they can't work. Meanwhile, Kakeru goes to Nico-chan in order to dispel his doubts about Haiji, but he's unable to find a definitive answer. While this is happening, Shindo has an idea and suggests it to the other residents. His perseverance inspires King to give running a try.
7	"Bear Your Fangs at the Summit"; Transliteration: "Itadaki ni Kiba o Muke" (Japanese: 頂きに牙を剥け)	November 13, 2018
The residents of the Chikusei-so go to Tokyo Sport University in order to attend their first track meet. While there, Kakeru is reunited with his old teammate Sakaki Kosuke. Sakaki persistently attempts to provoke Kakeru. When Haiji tries to stop them, a man calls out to him. That man is the champion of Hakone and Rikudo University's ace, Fujioka Kazuma.
8	"Dangerous Character"; Transliteration: "Kiken Jinbutsu" (Japanese: 危険人物)	November 20, 2018
The residents of the Chikusei-so experience a crushing defeat at the track meet. When Kakeru sees his teammates complain and praise one another for their powerlessness, he explodes. While trying to calm down Kakeru, Nico-chan reveals his feelings towards running that he's been hiding. Kakeru advises him to try as hard as possible. The next morning, Kakeru and Nico-chan abandon Haiji's coaching and begin training alone. Meanwhile, in order to regain the comic reading time that was taken from him by practice, Prince plans to have a certain item delivered to the apartment.
9	"Mismatched Runners"; Transliteration: "Fuzoroi no Senshu-tachi" (Japanese: ふぞろいの選手たち)	November 27, 2018
Kakeru asks Prince to quit the team depending on his performance at the next track meet. Though Haiji says Kakeru's words are ineffective, Prince wonders if he'll be able to achieve an official record. But there's something else bothering Haiji: there's one leftover portion of food. Nico-chan is trying to diet.
10	"Our Speed"; Transliteration: "Bokutachi no Sokudo" (Japanese: 僕たちの速度)	December 4, 2018
Haiji suddenly faints. The residents realize how Haiji has been supporting them, and Nico-chan encourages Kakeru and Prince to reconcile. However, the stubborn boys refuse to bridge the gap. The next day, Shindo suggests that the team pick a temporary captain. When all the older members refuse, Kakeru agrees to do the job. Desperate to do something about Prince, Kakeru follows him around while nagging him. Prince's opposition increases in response. However, Kakeru manages to help Prince by learning to see things as he does. As the residents are unable to even feed themselves, Hana comes to extend a helping hand.
11	"Overflowing Drops"; Transliteration: "Koboreru Shizuku" (Japanese: こぼれる雫)	December 11, 2018
The twins and Musa achieve official records, and the residents of the Chikusei-so feel there's hope for them. However, Shindo and Yuki begin to panic as they fail to beat their personal records for close to a month. Haiji tries to reason with them, but words alone aren't enough to save them. Meanwhile, the heavy rains continue, impeding the progress of the residents. The other residents grow concerned as Shindo continues to work hard at practice and his studies. Meanwhile, Kakeru and Haiji spot champion Fujioka Kazuma in a track and field magazine. The episode ends with a mysterious man with a camera, who seems to recognize Kakeru.
12	"Summer Prank"; Transliteration: "Natsu no Itazura" (Japanese: 夏のいたずら)	January 8, 2019
Kansei University's battle to achieve official records formally begins. Having already achieved their official records, Musa, Jota, and Joji watch the race with Hanako. Kakeru joins the lead pack and competes with exchange students from strong schools. Meanwhile, the stagnating Shindo and Yuki utilize their strengths to make a strong effort towards achieving an official time. During the final lap, Haiji's words cut through Kakeru's mind. "Do you like running?" In that moment, something inside him opens, and Kakeru bangs out an astonishing time. After the race, a lone reporter approaches Kakeru, and the mysterious man with the camera introduces himself to the boys as Shinjitsu Weekly's Shuji Mochizuki. Mr. Mochizuki seems to know that Kakeru was part of a track team of a prestigious high school. Haiji takes the whole group to Lake Shirakaba for a training camp. Tokyo Sport Uni also happens to be there at the same location. Haiji continues to encourage Kakeru with training advice. After being provoked by reminders of the past, Kakeru is triggered to dash forward to unleash his emotions upon his former-teammate from high school, Sakaki.
13	"And Then Start Running"; Transliteration: "Soshite Hashiridasu" (Japanese: そして走り出す)	January 15, 2019
In overthinking through flashbacks of high school, Kakeru remembers the isolation of being the high school coach's favorite. Pushed to his limit, Kakeru grabs ahold of Sakaki, but his friends come between them before anything can happen. Later they begin their grueling practice, but Kakeru can't stop recalling heavy memories from his high school days: a cruel past that pushed a group of elite runners to their breaking point. Recalling how he chose his own destruction, Kakeru agonizes over his past. That night, the sky is full of stars. Haiji appears next to Kakeru as he's hanging around by himself. Kakeru explains the backstory behind Sakaki's grudge towards him. Kakeru is finally encouraged to open up to his teammates, which strengthens their friendship even further.
14	"You're Not Alone"; Transliteration: "Hitorijanai" (Japanese: 一人じゃない)	January 22, 2019
Yuki starts to show more interest in the goals of their training schedule. They undergo eight 5000 meter runs; Hana's truck follows the boys to support them in the heat with splash water. At night, the team lights up some fireworks. Prince finally realizes that he's not alone, as he resolves to get his official record with the support of the team.
15	"Place of Destiny"; Transliteration: "Unmei no Basho" (Japanese: 運命の場所)	January 29, 2019
The entire team achieves official records. Though they still have many challenges to face before they make it through the qualifier, the exceptions of everyone around them continue to rise. They even receive an interview request from a TV station. While the others are excited, Yuki alone seems unhappy. The race commences and eventually Kakeru manages to dash into his zone state. The other members of the Kansei team are motivated by the moments of a swift Kakeru passing by. A runner from another school trips and falls right in front of Haiji.
16	"Dreams and Reality"; Transliteration: "Yume to Utsutsu" (Japanese: 夢と現(うつつ))	February 5, 2019
Fortunately, Haiji is able to avoid crashing into the fallen runner, but he puts all his weight on his right leg. The fall causes a commotion at the water station. The cold rain mercilessly pounds down on the runners and the fans watching over them. Eventually the races moves into the city streets, and the runners' race for survival accelerates. After everyone manages to finish, the results of the Tokyo-Hakone Collegiate Ekiden Relay Race is announced for all to hear. After considering the results, Taro and Jiro start to wonder about why they all run and for what purpose.
17	"Searching for the Answer"; Transliteration: "Kotae Sagashite" (Japanese: 答え探して)	February 12, 2019
The team is inundated by club applicants and interview requests. Despite them, Haiji calmly focuses on preparing for the race. However, Jota and Joji suddenly begin to oppose him. Haiji reveals that he too is trying to find the reason for running.
18	"And Then, Morning"; Transliteration: "Soshite Asa" (Japanese: そして朝)	February 19, 2019
While walking home with Musa, Kakeru ran into reigning champion Rikudo's Fujioka Kazuma. When Kakeru can't let go of the inconsiderate remarks made by some passers-by, Fujioka methodically and without faltering shows him the answer. Then Fujioka tells them about his shared history with Haiji, the burden Haiji has borne alone, and the response he gave to Fujioka. In Fujioka's words, Kakeru begins to sense the meaning of the "strength" Haiji once described to him. Meanwhile, Haiji is at a consultation with his doctor. His eyes are glued to the harsh reality they see.
19	"The Moment of Release"; Transliteration: "Tokihanatsu Toki" (Japanese: 解き放つ時)	February 26, 2019
The Tokyo-Hakone Round-Trip College Ekiden Race finally begins. Haiji was right, and Section 1 moves at a slow pace while the teams try to feel each other out. Prince, who bears the heavy responsibility of starting the race, takes up his position behind the other runners and conserves his strength. It's all part of Haiji's plan to take the top. Haiji also sends a message to Prince through Tazaki in the coach's vehicle and heads to the Tsurumi Relay Station where Musa waits. The group raises its pace. Prince desperately hangs on. Musa manages to pass 7 people during his part of the race.
20	"Even If I Break"; Transliteration: "Kowarete mo" (Japanese: 壊れても)	March 5, 2019
Hanako cheers for Jota on the sidelines. Pieces of memories run through his head. Jota, finally realizing his romantic feelings, accelerates and climbs in the standings. At the same time, Joji, who is informed about Hanako's feelings, is not completely here. The sudden Hanako panic leaves the other team members disconcerted as well. In order to get the race back on track, Kakeru asks Tazaki to give a message. Meanwhile, Haiji calls Shindo, who has arrived at the relay station. Their time feels simultaneously too long and too short. A tragic resolve spreads through Shindo's burning, feverish body.
21	"Goodbye, Beautiful World"; Transliteration: "Sayonara, Utsukushiki kono Sekai" (Japanese: さよなら、美しきこの世界)	March 12, 2019
His teammates faced death to pass the sash along. Bearing that weight in his mind, Yuki prepares for the race. Shindo approaches him. Turning his overflowing anxieties and regrets into strength, Yuki waits for the race to start. He manages to finish 2 seconds short of winning his segment. Nico-chan raises their rankings further and passes the sash onto King.
22	"Embrace Your Loneliness"; Transliteration: "Sabishisa o Dakishimero" (Japanese: 寂しさを抱きしめろ)	March 19, 2019
Sakaki's fighting spirit verges on tragic. As though dragged along by it, King loses his pace. He thinks back on a conversation he had once with Haiji. The words he can't say, the reality he can't escape. King's thoughts eventually arrive at the day he arrived at Chikusei-so. It was the beginning of a lonely but dream-like time. That small discouragement, that small pride. Carry all of it with you as you run. The men continue to fight to find themselves.
23	"In The Wind"; Transliteration: "Sore wa Kaze no Naka ni" (Japanese: それは風の中に)	March 26, 2019
Kakeru is bewildered by this new experience. His speed overwhelms the other competitors. Meanwhile, Rikudo's ace Fujioka breaks the section record as promised and pushes his team into 1st place. Eventually, Kakeru finishes his section and beats Fujioka's newly set record by 1 second. Haiji begins the final section of the Hakone Ekiden. In order for Kansei University to make the top 10, Haiji must race to beat Tokyo Sport University by a significant margin. He struggles throughout his run and in the last stretch feels a sharp pain from his injured knee. Seeing Kakeru at the finish line, he pushes through and finishes in time for Kansei University to come in 10th, giving them a seed for the next year's race. Three years pass and each member has gone on to find their way.

==== Music ====
TV Anime "Run with the Wind" Original Soundtrack

Soundtrack album by Yuki Hayashi
- Released: December 19, 2018
- Genre: Soundtrack
- Length: 1:55:27
- Label: Toho Animation Records
- Producers: Yuki Hayashi; Yasushi Horiguchi (co-producer)

In the first half of the anime, the opening theme song is "Catch Up, Latency" by Unison Square Garden and the ending theme song is "Reset" by Taichi Mukai. In the second half of the anime, the opening theme song is "Kaze Tsuyoku, Kimi Atsuku" by Q-MHz and Sky-Hi, and the ending theme song is "Michi" by Taichi Mukai.

The anime series' soundtrack is composed by Yuki Hayashi. A two-disc soundtrack album published by Toho Animation Records was released on December 19, 2018, with a total of 51 tracks.

All music is composed by Yuki Hayashi.

Disc 1
No.	Title	Length
1.	"We Must Go"	6:15
2.	"Campus Life" (キャンパスライフ)	1:36
3.	"Chikusei-sō" (竹青荘)	1:33
4.	"Ryūsei" (流星)	2:45
5.	"Hashiru to Iu Koto" (走るということ)	2:28
6.	"Jūnin-tachi" (住人たち)	1:22
7.	"Honne" (本音)	2:27
8.	"Kōitten" (紅一点)	1:19
9.	"Still Wear The Jersey"	1:34
10.	"Kako" (過去)	2:13
11.	"Otagai" (お互い)	2:04
12.	"Sakebi" (叫び)	1:39
13.	"Hitori" (一人)	4:16
14.	"Eyecatch" (アイキャッチ)	0:11
15.	"Sakuryakuka Haiji" (策略家・ハイジ)	1:18
16.	"Onigunsō" (鬼軍曹)	1:32
17.	"Team" (チーム)	1:48
18.	"In a Sweat !"	2:00
19.	"Iza Hakone e" (いざ箱根へ)	1:39
20.	"Fumidasu Ippo" (踏み出す一歩)	2:19
21.	"Genjitsu" (現実)	4:30
22.	"Yozora" (夜空)	2:28
23.	"Kirokukai" (記録会)	3:05
24.	"Kyori" (距離)	2:42
25.	"Shinrai" (信頼)	2:17
Total length:		57:20

Disc 2
No.	Title	Lyrics	Performer(s)	Length
1.	"Hakone no Yama wa Tenka no Ken" (箱根の山は天下の険)			3:08
2.	"Slice of Life"			1:31
3.	"Tachiba" (立場)			1:49
4.	"Tōhi" (逃避)			2:30
5.	"Explanation"			1:36
6.	"Kisetsu" (季節)			2:23
7.	"Yosenkai" (予選会)			1:24
8.	"Henka" (変化)			1:42
9.	"Haiji to Fujioka" (ハイジと藤岡)			1:59
10.	"Sakusen" (作戦)			1:36
11.	"Trouble" (トラブル)			1:55
12.	"Kōkai" (後悔)			2:49
13.	"Tsuyosa" (強さ)			1:31
14.	"Kake" (賭け)			1:43
15.	"Kodoku" (孤独)			1:57
16.	"Sokudo to Rhythm" (速度とリズム)			1:42
17.	"Jiyū de Byoudō na Basho" (自由で平等な場所)			1:56
18.	"Yume" (夢)			2:02
19.	"Kuroi Dangan" (黒い弾丸)			4:21
20.	"Konmei" (混迷)			1:42
21.	"Kakugo" (覚悟)			1:58
22.	"Kaze ga Tsuyoku Fuiteiru" (風が強く吹いている)			5:08
23.	"Chōten" (頂点)			3:08
24.	"Kanata e" (彼方へ)			3:33
25.	"Catch up, latency (TV Size)" (composed by Tomoya Tabuchi)	Tomoya Tabuchi	UNISON SQUARE GARDEN	1:33
26.	"Reset (TV Size)" (composed by Taichi Mukai & CELSIOR COUPE)	Taichi Mukai	Taichi Mukai	1:31
Total length:				58:07
