= Koshiro Tanaka =

Japanese martial artist (born 1940)

Kōshirō Tanaka
- 田中光四郎
- Born: 1940 (age 85–86); Tagawa, Fukuoka Prefecture, Empire of Japan
- Spouse: Takiko Tanaka
- Military career
- Allegiance: Afghan mujahideen
- Branch: Jamiat-e Islami
- Service years: 1985–1989
- Nickname: Afghan Samurai
- Conflicts: Soviet–Afghan War

Koshiro Tanaka (Japanese: 田中光四郎; born 1940) is a Japanese martial artist who fought for the mujahideen in the Soviet–Afghan War. Tanaka left an office-job in Japan and travelled to Peshawar, Pakistan, and then to Afghanistan, where he joined Jamiat-e Islami and took up arms against the Soviet and Afghan government armies.

== Early life ==
Koshiro Tanaka was born in 1940 in Tagawa, Fukuoka Prefecture. He studied karate from childhood, and then judo, aikido and kendo. As an adult, Tanaka embarked on a career as a businessman, but gradually came to the idea that the purpose of his life was martial arts. He graduated from the Kanagawa University Faculty of Law and Economics. He decided the best "test site" for his spirit and body would be war-torn Afghanistan.

=== Afghanistan ===
In 1985, while sitting in his office at Tokyo's Shinjuku district he spoke of preparations for his self-financed trip to Afghanistan. He traveled to Peshawar, the capital of Pakistan's Northwest Frontier Province with $10,000 to distribute to the mujahideen. He raised the money through his company. Peshawar was the seat of the Afghan resistance movement and seven different Muslim militant groups were headquartered there. Peshawar was then home to more than 3 million Afghan refugees. Tanaka joined Jamiat-e Islam which was the second largest mujahideen group in the country, headed by Burhanuddin Rabbani. As he prepared to depart to Afghanistan, his wife Takiko stood beside him and showed support but wanted him to stay. She admitted she did not understand her husband's attraction to the mujahideen.

The mujahideen, he said, "need help, any kind of help. They need weapons, bread, food, anything". When Koshiro Tanaka arrived in Afghanistan, he exchanged his black uniform suit for a salwar kameez. He had no battlefield experience but nonetheless, he began to teach the mujahideen hand-to-hand combat. In February 1985, he took part in a battle against the Soviet and Afghan armies. Many journalists around the world reported on the so-called "Afghan samurai".

=== Reaction from Japan ===
The Japanese government disapproved of his activities. The Japanese embassy in Islamabad, Pakistan, officially warned Tanaka about the inappropriateness of involving himself in the Afghan war. Tanaka ignored this warning and began to train the Dushmans of the second largest group headed by Rabbani. He eventually viewed himself as a martyr for Japan, which had a territorial dispute with the Soviet Union over the southern Kuril Islands.

Tanaka strongly opposed the Japanese government and constitution for denying the Japanese people the chance to expel the Soviets from the Kuril Islands by force. The islands were surrendered to the Soviets following World War II.

== Post-Afghanistan ==
He later became the managing director of the Japan Freedom Afghanistan Association, the secretary general of the International Refugee Relief Committee, and succeeded the second Soke of Fuji Fluid Art in 1991, serving until 2007. In 2008, he launched his own school, the "Hiko School".

Tanaka wrote an autobiography based on his experience fighting Soviet and pro-communist Afghan troops in "Soviet Soldiers in a Gun Sight, My Battle in Afghanistan".
