= Yomiuri Shimbun Building =

Skyscraper in Japan

- 読売新聞ビル
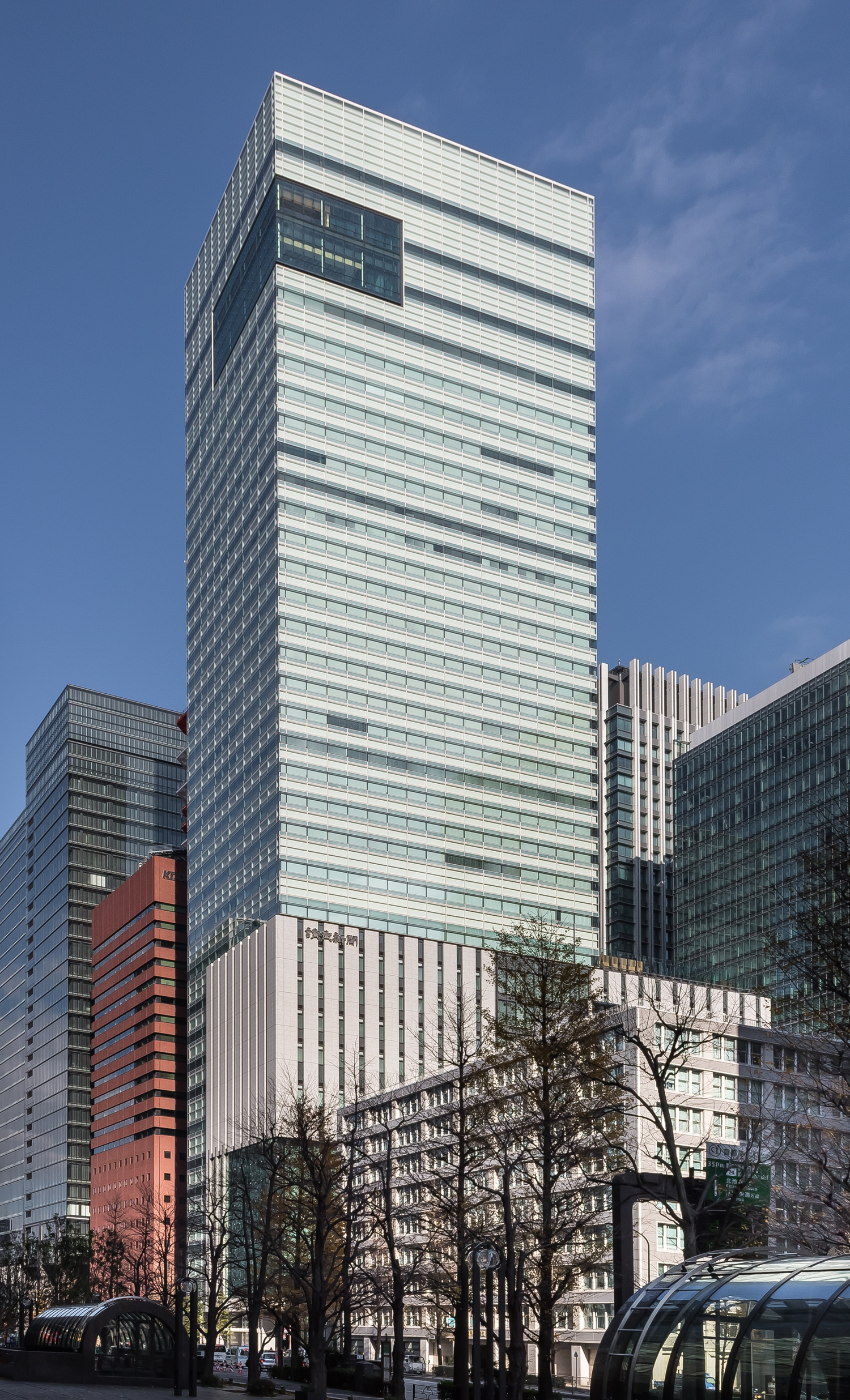
- Yomiuri Newspaper Tokyo Head Office Building
- Interactive map of the Yomiuri Shimbun Building area

General information
- Status: Completed
- Type: Offices, shops
- Location: Ōtemachi, Japan
- Coordinates: 35.687222°N 139.764194°E
- Completed: 2013; 13 years ago

Height
- Roof: 200 m (660 ft)
- Top floor: 33

Technical details
- Floor count: 36 (33 above ground, 3 underground)
- Floor area: 89,651 m^{2} (965,000 sq ft)
- Lifts/elevators: 29

The Yomiuri Shimbun Building (読売新聞ビル) is a skyscraper located in Ōtemachi, Tokyo, Japan.

The construction of the 200-meter tower was finished in 2013. The building houses the Tokyo headquarters of the Yomiuri Shimbun, a daily newspaper that is part of the Yomiuri Group, Japan's largest media conglomerate. The building is also referred to as the Yomiuri Newspaper Tokyo Head Office Building (読売新聞東京本社ビル).

The third through fifth floors house the Yomiuri Otemachi Hall and Yomiuri Otemachi Small Hall, venues used for movie screenings, theatrical productions, symposiums, and music concerts.
