= Kanagawa University =

University in Kanagawa-ku, Japan

- 神奈川大学
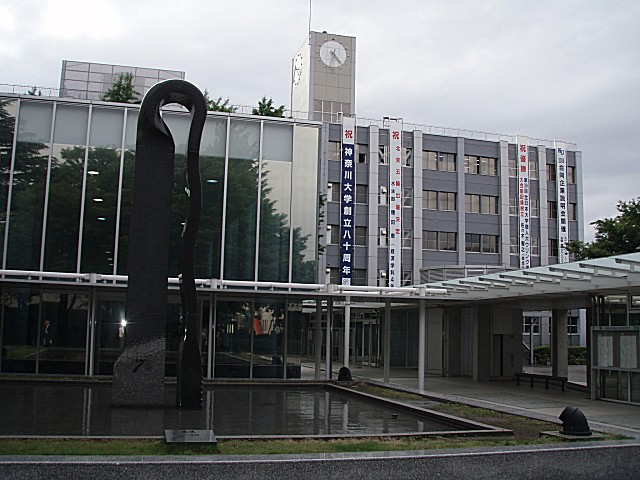
- Motto: 質実剛健・積極進取 (Simple and Sturdy / Forwardness)
- Type: Private
- Established: Founded 1928; Chartered 1949
- President: Yoshio Kaneko
- Faculty: 1,518
- Administrative staff: 364
- Students: 18,340
- Undergraduates: 17,929
- Postgraduates: 327
- Doctoral students: 84
- Location: Kanagawa-ku, Yokohama, Kanagawa, Japan; 35°29′06″N 139°37′14″E
- Campus: Urban
- Website: kanagawa-u.ac.jp

- Location in Kanagawa Prefecture, Japan

Kanagawa University (神奈川大学, Kanagawa Daigaku), abbreviated to Jindai (神大), is a private university in Japan. The main campus is located in Rokkakubashi, Kanagawa-ku, Yokohama, Kanagawa Prefecture.

== History ==
The university was founded in 1928 by Yoshimori Yoneda (米田吉盛) as Yokohama Academy (横浜学院, Yokohama gakuin). It was an evening school for the working youth. In 1929 the school was renamed Yokohama College (横浜専門学校, Yokohama semmon gakkō), which had both day and evening schools (Day school: Department of Commerce / evening school: Departments of Commerce and Law). On 15 May 1930 the college moved to present-day Rokkakubashi Campus. In 1939 it added the technical departments (Mechanical Engineering, Electrical Engineering and Industrial Administration). In 1949 the college was developed into Kanagawa University, under Japan's new educational system.

The university at first had three faculties: the Faculties of Commerce and Engineering and the evening school's Faculty of Commerce. The latter history of the university is as follows:

- 1950: the Faculty of Commerce was renamed Faculty of Law and Economics.
- 1965: the Faculty of Foreign Languages (English and Spanish) was established.
  the Faculty of Law and Economics was divided into two faculties.
- 1967: the Graduate Schools of Law (master's/doctoral), Economics (master's/doctoral) and Engineering (master's courses only) were established.
- 1989: Hiratsuka Campus was opened (Shonan Hiratsuka Campus today).
  the Faculties of Business Administration and Science were established.
- 1990: the doctoral courses were added to the Graduate School of Engineering.
- 1992: the Graduate School of Foreign Languages was established (master's courses only).
- 1993: the Graduate Schools of Business Administration, Science and History & Folklore Studies were established (master's courses only).
- 1995: the doctoral courses were added to the Graduate Schools of Business Administration, Science and History & Folklore Studies.
- 2004: the School of Law was established.
- 2006: the Faculty of Human Sciences was established.
- 2019: the School of Law was closed
- 2020: the Faculty of Cross-Cultural and Japanese Studies was opened.
- 2021: Minato Mirai Campus was established.
- 2022: the Faculty of Architecture and Building Engineering was established.
- 2023: Shonan Hiratsuka Campus was closed.
- 2023: the Faculty of Chemistry and Biochemistry was established.
- 2023: the Faculty of Informatics was established.
- 2024: the Graduated School of Foreign Language was renamed Graduate School of Humanities.

== Graduate schools ==
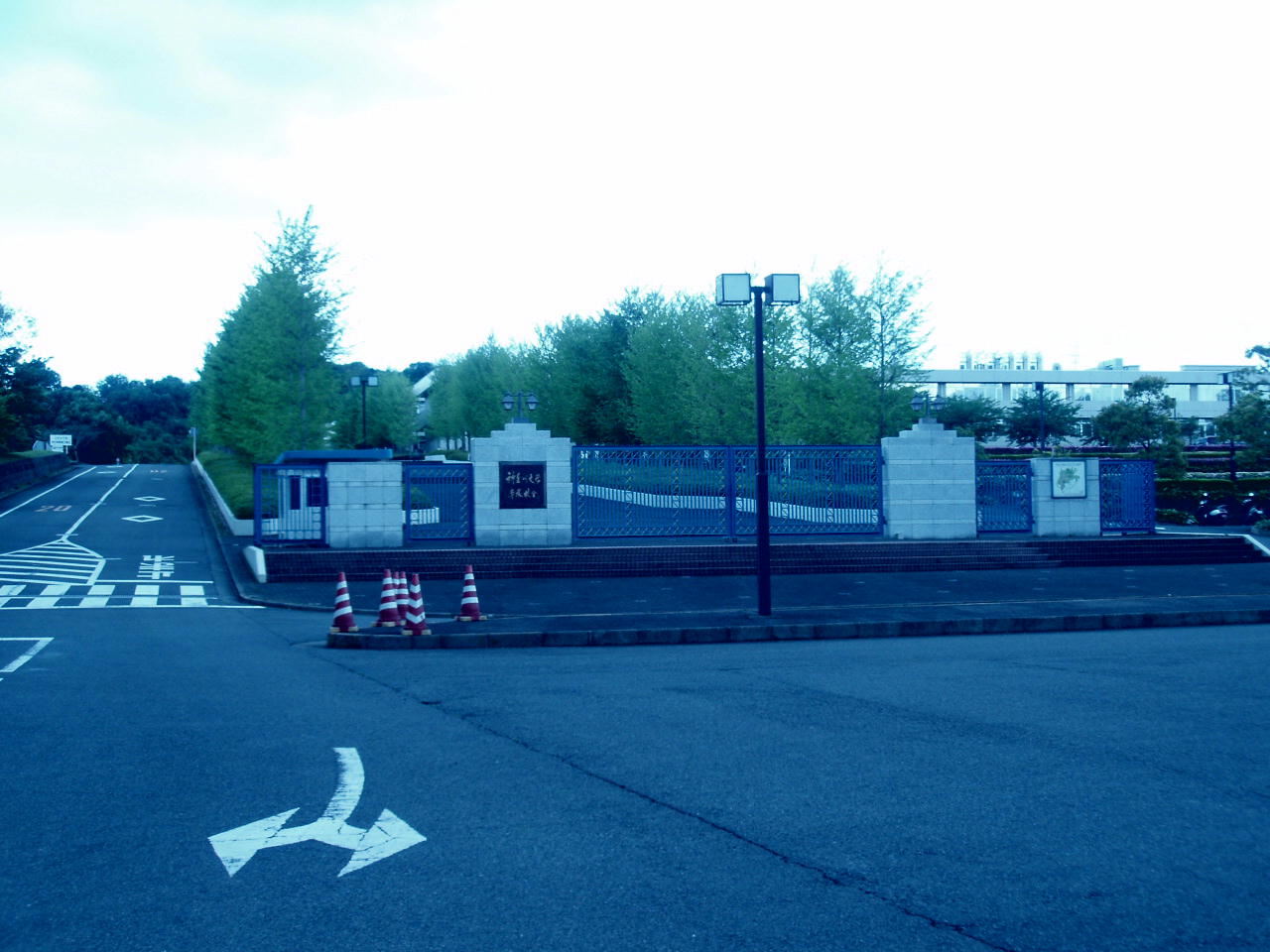
Shonan Hiratsuka Campus

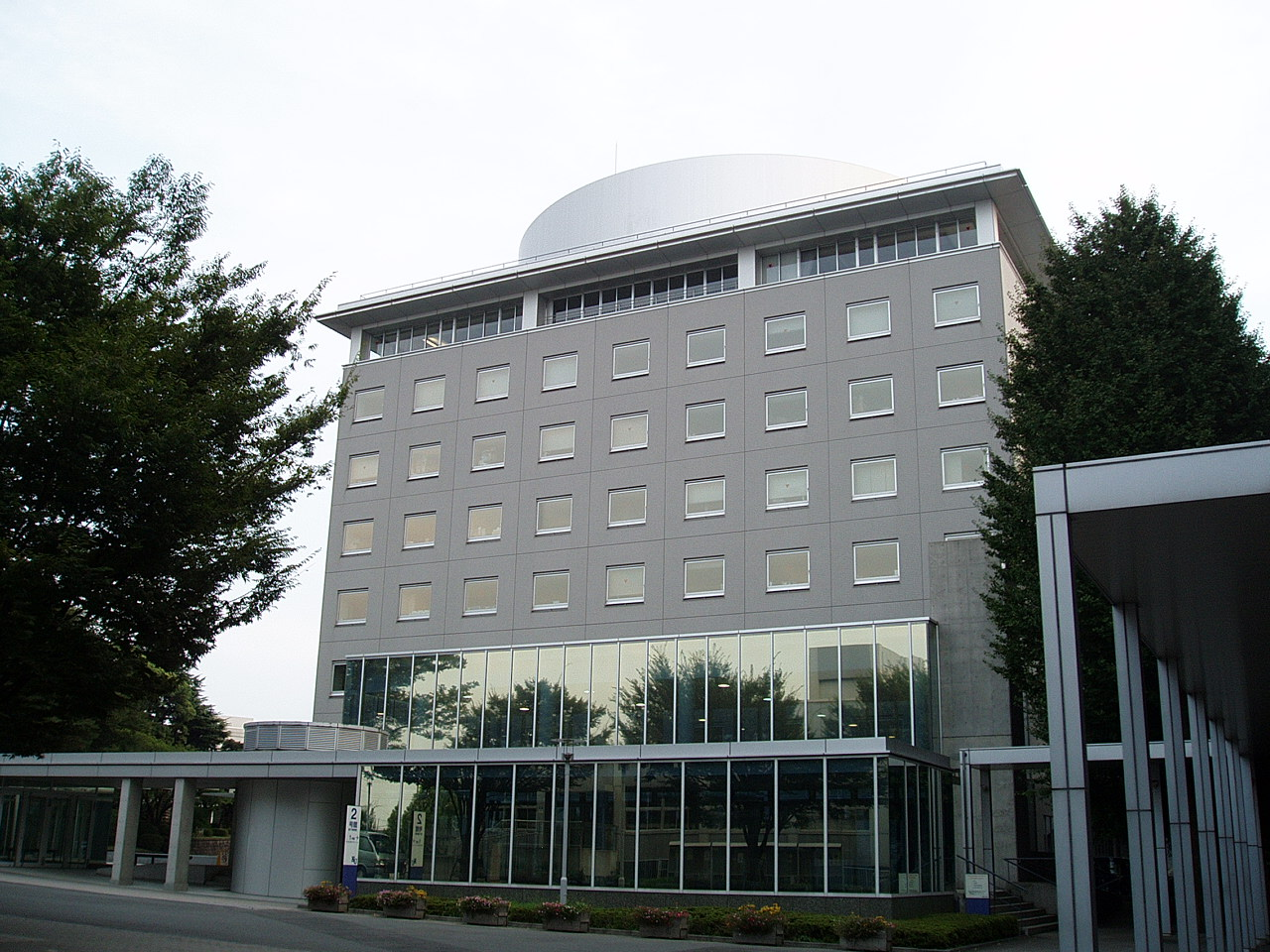
Yokohama Campus

- Graduate School of Law
- Graduate School of Economics
- Graduate School of Business Administration
- Graduate School of Humanities
- Graduate School of Science
- Graduate School of Engineering
- Graduate School of History & Folklore Studies

== Undergraduate schools ==
=== At Yokohama Campus ===
- Faculty of Law
  - Department of Law
  - Department of Local Government
- Faculty of Economics
  - Department of Economics
    - Contemporary Economics Major
    - Economic Analysis Major
  - Department of Contemporary Business
- Faculty of Human Sciences
  - Department of Human Sciences
    - Psychology and Human Development Course
    - Sports and Health Course
    - Human Society Course
- Faculty of Science
  - Department of Science
    - Mathematics Course
    - Physics Course
    - Chemistry Course
    - Biology Course
    - Global Environmental Science Course
    - Comprehensive Science Course
- Faculty of Engineering
  - Department of Mechanical Engineering
  - Department of Electrical, Electronics and Information Engineer
  - Department of Industrial Engineering and Management
  - Department of Applied Physics
- Faculty of Architecture and Building Engineering
  - Architecture and Building Engineering Course
  - Urban Life Design Course
- Faculty of Chemistry and Biochemistry
  - Department of Applied Chemistry
  - Department of Biochemistry and Biotechnology
- Faculty of Informatics
  - Department of Computer Science
  - Department of Applied Systems Mathematics
  - Advanced Informatics Program

=== Minato Mirai Campus ===
- Faculty of Business Administration
  - Department of International Business Administration
- Faculty of Foreign Languages
  - Department of English
  - Department of Spanish
  - Department of Chinese
- Faculty of Cross-Cultural and Japanese Studies
  - Department of Cross-Cultural Studies
  - Department of Japanese Cultures
  - Department of History and Folklore Studies

== Institutes ==
- Library
- Institute for Legal Studies
- Institute of Economics and Foreign Trade
- Institute of International Business and Management
- Institute for Humanities Research
- Center for Language Studies
- Center for Clinical Psychology
- Research Institute for Integrated Science
- Institute for Technological Research
- Institute for the Study of Japanese Folk Culture
- Center for Asian Studies
- Institute for Architecture and Building Engineering
- Research Institute for Marine and Port Studies

== Athletics ==
=== American football ===
The Kanagawa University American football team is the ATOMS.

=== Cheerleading ===
The Kanagawa University Cheerleading Club is the WILDCATS or WINGS of Kanagawa University.

=== Baseball ===
The Kanagawa University baseball team is known for their long history of success in Kanagawa Univ. Baseball League.

=== Football ===
The Kanagawa University football team participated in the Emperor's Cup, in 1997, 2006, 2016.

=== Rugby ===
The Kanagawa University Rugby Football Club

=== Kendo ===
The Kanagawa University kendo club. Graduates of the Kendo club include Hiroyasu Koga, Yukio Mishima Harakiri(Seppuku) supported ("Mishima Incident"1970).

=== Ekiden ===
The Kanagawa university ekiden team won the Hakone Ekiden, in 1997, 1998.

== Alumni ==
Kanagawa University students have become businessmen, leading politicians, writers, architects, athletes, actors, musicians, martial artist, scientists, engineer, and video game developers. Among the notable alumni are:

- Hideo Kamio, vice-president of Toyota
- Takeo Masuda, vice-president of ITOCHU
- Lynn Okamoto, Mangaka of Gokukoku no Brynhildr, Elfen Lied
- Koshiro Tanaka, famous karateka master.
- Yuuhei Sato, Governor of Fukushima Prefecture
- Nobuo Uematsu, video game composer of Final Fantasy series by Square Enix
