= Shion Miura =

Japanese writer (born 1976)

- 三浦 しをん
- Born: 1976 (age 49–50); Tokyo, Japan
- Education: Waseda University
- Occupations: Novelist, essayist
- Writing career
- Language: Japanese
- Genres: Fiction, essay
- Notable works: Mahoro ekimae Tada benriken; Fune wo amu; Ano ie ni kurasu yonin no onna
- Notable awards: Naoki Prize; Oda Sakunosuke Prize; Japan Booksellers' Award

Shion Miura (三浦 しをん, Miura Shion; born 1976) is a Japanese writer. She has won the Naoki Prize, the Oda Sakunosuke Prize, and the Japan Booksellers' Award. Her work has been adapted for film and television, and her books have been translated into Indonesian, Chinese, Korean, Vietnamese, English, German and Italian.

== Early life and education ==
Miura was born in Tokyo, Japan in 1976. While attending university she planned to become an editor, but she was signed by a literary agent and started her writing career. She graduated from Waseda University.

== Career ==
A year after graduating from Waseda, Miura published her first novel, Kakuto suru mono ni maru (A Passing Grade for Those Who Fight). She won the 135th Naoki Prize in 2006 for her book Mahoro ekimae Tada benriken. The novel and its sequels have been adapted into a series of movies by Tatsushi Ōmori, a TV Tokyo television show, and a manga series. Her novel Kaze ga tsuyoku fuiteiru (Run with the Wind), about 2 former elite runners who inspire each other to take up running again, was published in 2006 and later adapted into a 2009 live-action film and a 2018 NTV animated series. In 2008 her novel Hikari (Light), a story about rape, murder, and consequences over time, was published. Hikari was adapted into a 2017 suspense film directed by Tatsushi Ōmori.

Miura's novel Fune wo amu (Compiling the Boat), about a 15 year effort to create a new dictionary called The Great Passage, was published by Kobunsha in 2011. In 2012 Fune wo amu won the Japan Booksellers' Award. A 2013 film adaptation of Fune wo amu, directed by Yuya Ishii, won several Japan Academy Prizes, including Best Picture. In 2016 Fuji TV adapted the novel into an anime series, also called Fune wo amu. An English version of Fune wo amu, translated by Juliet Winters Carpenter, was published in 2017 under the title The Great Passage. Kris Kosaka of The Japan Times described The Great Passage as "stylistically adept, with the shift in narratives smoothly connecting as characters’ stories overlap through time and space."

In 2015 Miura's novel Ano ie ni kurasu yonin no onna, a story that loosely follows the setting and themes of Jun'ichirō Tanizaki's work The Makioka Sisters, won the 32nd Oda Sakunosuke Prize.

Miura has cited Kenji Maruyama and Hideo Nakai as favorite authors. She is a fan of BL manga, and a collection of her essays on yaoi was published under the title Shumi ja nainda (It's Not Just a Hobby) in 2006.

== Recognition ==
- 2006 135th Naoki Prize (2006上)
- 2012 9th Japan Booksellers' Award
- 2015 Oda Sakunosuke Prize

== Works ==
=== Fiction ===
- Kakutōsuru mono ni maru, Soshisha, 2000, ISBN 9784794209603
- Watakushi ga katarihajimeta kare wa, Shinchosha, 2004, ISBN 9784104541034
- Mukashi no hanashi, Gentōsha, 2005, ISBN 9784344007413
- Kaze ga tsuyoku fuiteiru (Run with the Wind), Shinchosha, 2006, ISBN 9784104541041
- Mahoro ekimae Tada benriken (Handymen in Mahoro Town), Bungei Shunjū, 2006, ISBN 9784163246703
- Kimi wa Porarisu, Shinchosha, 2007, ISBN 9784104541058
- Bukka o ezu, Futabasha, 2007, ISBN 9784575235944
- Hikari, Shueisha, 2008, ISBN 9784087712728
- Mahoro ekimae bangaichi, Bungei Shunjū, 2009, ISBN 9784163286006
- Kamusari nānā nichijō (The Easy Life in Kamusari), Tokuma Shoten, 2009, ISBN 9784198627317
- Fune wo amu ("Knitting the Boat") (The Great Passage), Kobunsha, 2011, ISBN 9784334927769
- Koguresō monogatari, Shōdensha, 2010, ISBN 9784396633462
- Kamisari nānā yawa (Kamusari Tales Told at Night), Tokuma Shoten, 2012, ISBN 9781542039192
- Mahoro ekimae kyōsōkyoku, Bungei Shunjū, 2013, ISBN 9784163825809
- Ano ie ni kurasu yonin no onna, Chūō Kōron Shinsha, 2015, ISBN 9784120047398

=== Nonfiction ===
- Shion no shiori, Shinchosha, 2002, ISBN 9784104541010
- Jinsei gekijō, Shinchosha, 2003, ISBN 9784104541027
- Otome nageyari, Ōta Shuppan, 2004, ISBN 9784872338591
- Momoiro towairaito, Ōta Shuppan, 2005, ISBN 9784872339734
- Shumi ja nainda, Shinshokan, 2006, ISBN 9784403220487
- Ayatsurare bunraku kanshō, Popurasha, 2007, ISBN 9784591097830
- Monzetsu supairaru, Ōta Shuppan, 2008, ISBN 9784778311025

=== Works in English ===
- The Great Passage, trans. Juliet Winters Carpenter, Amazon Crossing, 2017, ISBN 9781477823071
- The Easy Life in Kamusari, trans. Juliet Winters Carpenter, Amazon Crossing, 2021, ISBN 9781542027168
- Kamusari Tales Told at Night, trans. Juliet Winters Carpenter, Amazon Crossing, 2022, ISBN 9781542028882
- Run with the Wind, trans. Yui Kajita, HarperVia, ISBN 9780063330894

== Film and other adaptations ==
- Kaze ga tsuyoku fuiteiru (Run with the Wind), 2009 film
- Mahoro ekimae Tada benriken (Tada's Do-It-All House), 2011 film
- Fune wo amu (The Great Passage), 2013 film
- Mahoro ekimae bangaichi, 2013 TV Tokyo television show
- Mahoro ekimae kyosokyoku (Tada’s Do-it-All House: Disconcerto), 2014 film
- Wood Job!, 2014 film, adapted from The Easy Life in Kamusari
- Fune wo amu (The Great Passage), 2016 Fuji TV anime series
- Hikari (And Then There Was Light), 2017 film
- Kaze ga tsuyoku fuiteiru (Run with the Wind), 2018 NTV animated series
