= List of Nikkatsu Roman Porno films =

The Nikkatsu Roman Porno films were a series of theatrical Japanese softcore pornographic films produced by the movie studio Nikkatsu from November, 1971, until May, 1988. The Japanese word roman (ロマン) arguably either refers to the French word roman, meaning "novel" (work of fiction), or is an abbreviation of the phrase "romantic pornography". This is a list of the films in that series.

== 1971 ==
| Release date | Title | Director | Cast | Notes |
|---|---|---|---|---|
1971
| 1971-11-20 | Apartment Wife: Affair In the Afternoon 団地妻・昼下りの情事; Danchizuma hirusagari no jōji | Shōgorō Nishimura | Kazuko Shirakawa; Maki Nanjo; Tatsuya Hamaguchi | First Nikkatsu Roman Porno. First of the 21-film Apartment Wife series of character-driven films focusing on the sexual lives of working-class people. |
| 1971-11-20 | Castle Orgies 色暦大奥秘話; Irogoyomi ōoku hiwa | Isao Hayashi | Setsuko Ogawa; Yoichi Nishikawa; Yasuko Matsui | First of the nine-film Eros Schedule Book series. Setsuko Ogawa's debut film. |
| 1971-12-01 | Crazy for Love 恋狂い; Koigurui | Akira Katō | Kazuko Shirakawa; Ryuji Ohizumi | |
| 1971-12-01 | Coed Report: Yuko's White Breasts 女子高生レポート 夕子の白い胸; Joshikōsei report: Yūko no shiroi mune | Yukihiko Kondo | Yūko Katagiri; Emiko Yamagishi; Yuki Takami | Yūko Katagiri's debut film, a high-school sex melodrama involving lesbianism and eels. |
| 1971-12-18 | Eros Schedule Book: Female Artist 色暦女浮世絵師; Irogoyomi onna ukiyoe-shi | Chūsei Sone | Setsuko Ogawa; Soichiro Maeno | 7th Best Film of the year: Eiga Geijutsu magazine Former Seijun Suzuki assistant, Chūsei Sone's directorial debut. Sone would bring Suzuki's stylistic influences to the pink film. Not part of the Eros Schedule Book series. |
| 1971-12-18 | Call of the Pistil 花芯の誘い; Kashin no sasoi | Masaru Konuma | Keiko Maki; Hajime Mitamura | Masaru Konuma's critically praised debut. |
| 1971-12-28 | Sex Rider: Wet Highway 濡れたハイウェイ; Sex rider: nureta highway | Koretsugu Kurahara | Mari Tanaka; Ken Yoshizawa | Sex/action film about a man who pretends to be dead after he is hit by a woman driver, in order to rape her later. |
| 1971-12-28 | Coed Report: Blooming Yuko 女子高生レポート 花ひらく夕子; Jokōsei report: hanahiraku Yūko | Yukihiko Kondo | Yūko Katagiri; Hajime Kondo; Mitsuko Aoi | Sequel to Coed Report: Yuko's White Breasts (1971). |

== 1972 ==
| Release date | Title | Director | Cast | Notes |
|---|---|---|---|---|
1972
| 1972-01-08 | Affair at Twilight たそがれの情事; Tasogare no jōji | Shōgorō Nishimura | Kazuko Shirakawa; Hidemi Hara | An unsuccessful attempt to emulate the Apartment Wife series. Similar plot and cast, but not part of that series. |
| 1972-01-08 | Glorious Moment: A Woman's Roll 晴姿おんな絵巻; Haresugata onna emaki | Isao Hayashi | Setsuko Ogawa; Hiroshi Gojo | Melodrama involving a banker, the Minister of Finance, and a sexually awakened virgin. |
| 1972-01-18 | Love Hunter 恋の狩人 ラブ・ハンター; Koi no karyūdo: rabu hantaa | Seiichirō Yamaguchi | Hidemi Hara; Mari Tanaka; Sumiko Minami | Film banned for obscenity, and director Seiichirō Yamaguchi arrested. |
| 1972-01-18 | Office Lady Journal: Scent of Female Cat; OL日記 雌猫の匂い; OL nikki: mesuneko no nioi | Katsuhiko Fujii | Rie Nakagawa; Masako Saga | First of the seven-film Office Lady Journal series. |
| 1972-01-29 | Love Bandit Rat Man aka Love Bandit Nezumi Kozo 性盗ねずみ小僧; Seitō Nezumi Kozō | Chūsei Sone | Setsuko Ogawa; Hiroshi Gojo | Dark parody of the Edo period Robin Hood story, Nezumi Kozō. Today considered a cult classic. |
| 1972-01-29 | Wet Lips 濡れた唇; Nureta kuchibiru | Tatsumi Kumashiro | Moeko Ezawa; Keiko Aikawa; Hajime Tanimoto | Kumashiro's first major film. |
| 1972-02-09 | Beads from a Petal 花弁のしずく; Kaben no shizuku | Noboru Tanaka | Rie Nakagawa; Keiko Maki; Kazuko Shirakawa | Tanaka's directorial debut, Rie Nakagawa's Nikkatsu debut. |
| 1972-02-09 | Sensuous Beasts しなやかな獣たち; Shinayakana kemonotachi | Akira Katō | Mari Tanaka; Naomi Tani; Shim Hara | Naomi Tani's Nikkatsu debut (supporting role). |
| 1972-02-19 | Seduction of the White Angel 白い天使の誘惑; Shiroi tenshi no yūwaku | Katsuhiko Fujii | Yūko Katagiri; Miki Hayashi; Masayoshi Nogami | First of Nikkatsu's many Roman Pornos involving nurses. |
| 1972-02-19 | Drifter's Affair さすらいの情事; Sasurai no jōji | Shōgorō Nishimura | Kazuko Shirakawa; Yuri Yamashina | |
| 1972-02-29 | 情炎お七恋唄; Jōen oshichi koiuta | Kōyū Ohara | Setsuko Ogawa; Ryuji Mori; Michiko Komori | |
| 1972-02-29 | 秘事 ひめごと; Himegoto | Isao Hayashi | Hidemi Hara | |
| 1972-03-18 | Student Wife: Weeping Silently 学生妻 しのび泣き; Gakusei-zuma: shinobi naki | Akira Katō | Yūko Katagiri; Isao Morishima | |
| 1972-03-18 | Foreigner's Mistress Oman: Holland Slope In the Rain らしゃめんお万 雨のオランダ坂; Rashamen Oman: ame no oranda-zaka | Chūsei Sone | Sally May; Shusaku Muto | First in a three-film series. Written by Suzuki script-writer, Atsushi Yamatoya. |
| 1972-03-29 | Sigh of Roses 薔薇のためいき; Bara no tameiki | Shōgorō Nishimura | Setsuko Ogawa; Yoshiro Ito | Story of a woman who gets revenge from her married lover by seducing his son. |
| 1972-03-29 | Love Hunter: Hot Skin ラブハンター 熱い肌; Love hunter: atsui hada | Masaru Konuma | Mari Tanaka; Ken Yoshizawa | Sequel to Love Hunter: Lust about a stripper arrested for obscenity. |
| 1972-04-08 | 性豪列伝 夜も昼も; Seigōretsuden: yoru mo hiru mo | Isao Hayashi | Kazuko Shirakawa | |
| 1972-04-08 | 白い女郎花; Shiroi ominaeshi | Katsuhiko Fujii | Yūko Katagiri; Michio Mako | |
| 1972-04-19 | 新宿真夜中物語 男と女; Shinjuku mayonaka monogatari: otoko to onna | Kōyū Ohara | Hidemi Hara; Yuri Yamashina; Michio Mako | |
| 1972-04-19 | Warmth of Love 愛のぬくもり; Ai no nukumori | Yukihiko Kondo | Mari Tanaka; Hiroshi Naka | Story of a high school teacher's wife who has sexual affairs with his students. |
| 1972-04-29 | Foreigner's Mistress Oman: Falling Autumn Flower らしゃめんお万 彼岸花は散った; Rashamen Oman: higanbana wa chitta | Chūsei Sone | Sally May; Miki Hayashi | 2nd in the Foreigner's Mistress Oman series. |
| 1972-04-29 | Apartment Wife: Secret Rendezvous 団地妻 しのび逢い; Danchizuma shinobiai | Shōgorō Nishimura | Kazuko Shirakawa; Keiko Aikawa | 2nd in the Apartment Wife series. |
| 1972-05-17 | Headlights In the Rain 雨のヘッドライト; Ame no heddoraito | Masaru Konuma | Mari Tanaka; Shusaku Muto | Melodramatic love-drama, Konuma's second film for Nikkatsu. |
| 1972-05-17 | Night of the Felines 牝猫たちの夜; Mesunekotachi no yoru | Noboru Tanaka | Tomoko Katsura; Hidemi Hara; Ken Yoshizawa | A realistic drama about prostitutes. Considered one of Tanaka's major early films. |
| 1972-05-27 | Mid-Afternoon Love Affair 真昼の情事; Mahiru no jōji | Katsuhiko Fujii | Kazuko Shirakawa; Tatsuya Hamaguchi; Tadashi Makimura | Unsuccessful attempt at a series similar to Apartment Wife. |
| 1972-05-27 | Eros Schedule Book Continued Concubine Secrets: Lustful Dance 続・色暦大奥秘話 淫の舞; Zoku irogoyomi ōku hiwa: in no mai | Isao Hayashi | Setsuko Ogawa; Yuri Yamashina | 2nd in the Eros Schedule Book series. |
| 1972-06-07 | Delicate Skillful Fingers 白い指の戯れ; Shiroi yubi no tawamure | Toru Murakawa | Ichiro Araki; Hiroko Isayama; Hajime Tanimoto | Story of a sexually liberated woman, containing a notorious bathtub orgy scene. Kinema Jumpo included Murakawa among Japan's 10 best directors for this, his debut film. |
| 1972-06-07 | Morning of Ecstasy 恍惚の朝; Kōkotsu no asa | Akira Katō | Rie Nakagawa; Yuri Yamashina | Soap opera about a woman who becomes re-acquainted with her boorish ex-boyfriend. |
| 1972-06-17 | Night Spot: Drifting Flower 盛り場 流れ花; Sakariba: nagarebana | Akihiko Yatsumaki | Yūko Katagiri; Michiyo Mako; Hiroshi Gojo | |
| 1972-06-17 | おんな天国 子だね貰います; Onna tengoku: kodane moraimasu | Kōyū Ohara | Mari Tanaka; Etsuko Hara; Soichiro Maeno | |
| 1972-06-28 | White Skin Glimmering In the Darkness 闇に浮ぶ白い肌; Yami ni ukabu shiroi hada | Shōgorō Nishimura | Kazuko Shirakawa; Hironobu Takahashi; Yuri Yamashina | Drama about a newlywed wife who returns, changed, after a 6-month disappearance. |
| 1972-06-28 | Erotic Story: The Peony Lantern aka Erotic Bride From Hell aka Hellish Love 性談牡丹燈籠; Seidan: botandōrō | Chūsei Sone | Setsuko Ogawa; Hajime Tanimoto; Miki Hayashi | Sexual historical-drama about the daughter of the shogun's retainer who returns from death as a ghost. An award-winning hit film popular with college students. |
| 1972-07-08 | Apartment Wife: Unforgettable Night 団地妻 忘れ得ぬ夜- Danchizuma wasureenu yoru | Saburo Endo | Junko Miyashita; Tatsuya Hamaguchi | 3rd in the Apartment Wife series. Junko Miyashita's first Roman Porno. |
| 1972-07-08 | 極楽坊主 女悦説法; Gokuraku bōzu: onna etsuseppō | Isao Hayashi | Hidemi Hara | |
| 1972-07-19 | Woman on the Night Train 夜汽車の女; Yogisha no Onna | Noboru Tanaka | Mari Tanaka; Keiko Tsuzuki; Toshihiko Oda | Noted for its camerawork and plot structure, critics compare this to Luis Buñuel's Diary of a Chambermaid (1964). |
| 1972-07-19 | Secret Wife 隠し妻; Kakushizuma | Masaru Konuma | Yūko Katagiri; Kiyoshi Yoshida | A television star secretly marries a country girl, but continues to womanize. Director Konuma and actress Katagiri were secretly married at the time the film was made. |
| 1972-07-27 | Romantic Tale: Otomi and Yosaburo 艶説 お富与三郎; Ensetsu: otomi yosaburō | Akira Katō | Keiko Tsuzuki; Hiroshi Gojo | A sex-centered version of a traditional Japanese folk tale. |
| 1972-07-27 | 真夏の夜の情事; Mannatsu no yoru no jōji | Katsuhiko Fujii | Kazuko Shirakawa | |
| 1972-08-05 | Eros Schedule Book Concubine Secrets: Tattoo Contest 色暦大奥秘話 刺青百人競べ; Irogoyomi ōku hiwa irezumi hyaku-nin kurabe | Yukihiko Kondo | Setsuko Ogawa | 3rd in the Eros Schedule Book series. |
| 1972-08-05 | Apartment Wife: Afternoon Bliss 団地妻 昼下りの悶え; Danchizuma hirusagari no modae | Shōgorō Nishimura | Akemi Nijo; Hironobu Takahashi | 4th in the Apartment Wife series |
| 1972-08-16 | August: Scent of Eros 八月はエロスの匂い; Hachigatsu wa eros no nioi | Toshiya Fujita | Maki Kawamura; Yūko Katagiri | Atsushi Yamatoya and Toshiya Fujita script about a department store cashier who becomes obsessed with the teenaged thug who robs her. |
| 1972-08-16 | 性豪列伝 死んで貰います; Seigōretsuden: shindemoraimasu | Isao Hayashi | Keiko Aikawa | |
| 1972-08-26 | Mistress 情婦; Jōfu | Saburo Endo | Junko Miyashita; Takao Nagai | Drama about a woman who becomes romantically involved with a paid killer. |
| 1972-08-26 | Foreigner's Mistress Oman: Tempestuous Skin 艶説女侠伝 お万乱れ肌; Enzetsu jokyo-den: Oman midarehada | Katsuhiko Fujii | Sally May; Miki Hayashi | 3rd, and last, in the Foreigner's Mistress Oman series |
| 1972-09-06 | Melancholy Flesh Business: Sensuous Zone 官能地帯 哀しみの女街- Kannō chitai: kanashimi no zegen | Toru Murakawa | Miyoko Aoyama; Mitsuko Aoi; Hideaki Ezumi | First Roman Porno starring Miyoko Aoyama, pink film star of the 1960s. |
| 1972-09-06 | Amorous Family: Like a Fox and a Racoon 好色家族 狐と狸; Kōshoku kazoku: kitsune to tanuki | Noboru Tanaka | Mari Tanaka; Mikiko Sakai; Hidemi Hara | Sex-comedy involving four greedy sisters seeking their dying mother's fortune. |
| 1972-09-16 | Love Affair Exposed 覗かれた情事; Nozokareta jōji | Shōgorō Nishimura | Kazuko Shirakawa; Eijiro Minato | Dark comedy about the wife of a porn writer who begins to behave like characters in his novels. |
| 1972-09-16 | Secret Chronicle: Prostitution Market (秘)女郎市場; Maruhi: jorō ichiba | Chūsei Sone | Yūko Katagiri; Aiko Kano | First in trilogy of comedies set in 19th-century brothels. |
| 1972-09-27 | 女子学生 セクシー・ダイナマイト; Joshigakusei: sekushii dainamaito | Isao Hayashi | Mari Tanaka | |
| 1972-09-27 | Edo Beauty: Feast of Lust 江戸小町 淫の宴; Edo komachi: in no utage | Akira Katō | Setsuko Ogawa; Yūko Katagiri | Sex historical-film about a woman who encounters incest, rape, prostitution and finally joins a convent. |
| 1972-10-07 | Seduction of Eros エロスの誘惑; Erosu no yūwaku | Toshiya Fujita | Rie Nakagawa; Miki Kawamura; Hosei Komatsu | Drama about the sex-lives of characters on the outskirts of society. Takes place entirely in a warehouse. |
| 1972-10-07 | Ichijo's Wet Lust 一条さゆり 濡れた欲情; Ichijō Sayuri: nureta yokujō | Tatsumi Kumashiro | Sayuri Ichijō; Hiroko Isayama; Kazuko Shirakawa | Story of a stripper and her manager. Earned writer/director Kumashiro the Kinema Junpo prize, and Hiroko Isayama Best Actress from Kinema Junpo |
| 1972-10-28 | Apartment Wife: Prime Woman 団地妻 女ざかり; Danchizuma onna-zakari | Saburo Endo | Junko Miyashita; Tatsuya Hamaguchi | 5th in the Apartment Wife series |
| 1972-10-28 | Three Wives: Wild Nights 妻三人 狂乱の夜; Tsuma san-nin: kyōran no yoru | Masaru Konuma | Akemi Nijo; Hidemi Hara; Mari Tanaka | Melodrama involving multiple wives and mistresses at a family estate. |
| 1972-11-08 | Seduction 2: Embrace of the White Angel 白い天使の抱擁; Shiroi tenshi no hōyō: yūwaku 2 | Katsuhiko Fujii | Yūko Katagiri; Hidemi Hara; Hijime Tanimoto | Sexual soap opera involving hospital staff. Loose sequel to Seduction of the White Angel (1972) |
| 1972-11-08 | Sensual Classroom: Techniques In Love 官能教室 愛のテクニック; Kannō kyōshitsu: ai no tekunikku | Noboru Tanaka | Mari Tanaka; Nobutaka Masutomi; Ryoji Nakamura | Story of a high school boy infatuated with his teacher. |
| 1972-11-18 | Afternoon Affair: Rear Window 昼下がりの情事 裏窓- Hirusagari no jōji: uramado | Shōgorō Nishimura | Kazuko Shirakawa; Taiji Tonoyama; Junko Miyashita | Story involving a voyeuristic woman and blackmail. |
| 1972-11-18 | New Eros Schedule Book: An Offering of Fine Skin 新・色暦大奥秘話 －やわ肌献上- Shin irogoyomi ōku hiwa: yawahada kenjō | Isao Hayashi | Setsuko Ogawa | 4th in the Eros Schedule Book series. |
| 1972-11-29 | Lusty Sisters 色情姉妹; Shikijō shimai | Chūsei Sone | Keiko Tsuzuki; Akemi Nijō | Drama of societal alienation involving three sisters: a secretary, a prostitute, and a gangster. A stylistic precursor to the later pink films of Hisayasu Satō. |
| 1972-11-29 | Sex Hunter: Wet Target セックス・ハンター 濡れた標的; Sex hunter: nureta hyōteki | Yukihiro Sawada | Joji Sawada (George Harrison); Hiroko Isayama; Miyoko Aoyama | Combines pink film format with rebel youth theme from Sawada's Alleycat Rock scripts |
| 1972-12-16 | Secret Chronicle: Opening the Doors to the Sacred Altar (秘)弁天御開帳; Maruhi benten gokaichō | Kazunari Takeda | Mariko Jun; Kyuzo Hayashiya | 2nd in Secret Chronicle trilogy |
| 1972-12-16 | Office Lady Journal: Affair of Female Cat; OL日記 牝猫の情事; OL nikki: mesuneko no jōji | Akira Katō | Rie Nakagawa; Katsuaki Yama | 2nd in the Office Lady Journal series |
| 1972-12-27 | 哀愁のサーキット; Aishū no saakitto | Toru Murakawa | 木山佳 | |
| 1972-12-27 | Naked Seven 戦国ロック 疾風の女たち; Sengoku rokku nayate no onnatachi | Yasuharu Hasebe | Mari Tanaka; Yuri Yamashina; Keiko Tsuzuki | Parody of Kurosawa's Seven Samurai and informal sequel to Hasebe's own Alleycat Rock series Had a limited release in the U.S. |

== 1973 ==
| Release date | Title | Director | Cast | Notes |
|---|---|---|---|---|
1973
| 1973-01-04 | New Eros Schedule Book Concubine Secrets: Flower Storm New Year Sex 新色暦大奥秘話 花吹雪おんな事始め; Shin irogoyomi ōoku hiwa: hanaafubuki onna kotohajime | Katsuhiko Fujii | Setsuko Ogawa | 5th in the Eros Schedule Book series. |
| 1973-01-04 | Confessions of an Adolescent Wife: Shocking! おさな妻の告白 衝撃 ショック; Osanazuma no kokuhaku: shōgeki shock! | Shōgorō Nishimura | Yūko Katagiri; Yuri Yamashina Hajime Tanimoto | First the Confessions of an Adolescent Wife trilogy films focusing on eroticism in working class settings. |
| 1973-01-13 | College Girls: Sex Equation 女子大生 SEX方程式; Joshidaisei: sex hōteishiki | Kōyū Ohara | Mari Tanaka; Maki Carrousel; Miyoko Aoyama | A dark youth-centered hit comedy about three female college students researching bathhouse prostitution for a magazine. |
| 1973-01-13 | Apartment Wife: Night of the Rape 団地妻 奪われた夜; Danchizuma ubawareta yoru | Saburo Endo | Junko Miyashita; Kazuko Shirakawa | 6th in the Apartment Wife series |
| 1973-01-24 | 性豪列伝 お揉みいたします; Seigōretsuden omomiitashimasu | Isao Hayashi | Hidemi Hara | |
| 1973-01-24 | Afternoon Affair: Metamorphosis 昼下りの情事 変身; Hirusagari no jōji: henshin | Noboru Tanaka | Miyoko Aoyama; Keiko Aikawa; Akira Takahashi | Drama about a delivery boy at a flower shop obsessed with a salesgirl who moonlights as a prostitute. |
| 1973-02-03 | Sex Rider: Injured Lust セックス・ライダー 傷だらけの欲情; Sex rider: kizudarake no yokujō | Koretsugu Kurahara | Mimi Sugihara; Masafumi Shiga | Sequel to Sex Rider: Wet Highway (1971) |
| 1973-02-03 | Overly-Ripe Breasts: Married Women 熟れすぎた乳房 人妻; Uresugita chibusa: hitozuma | Chūsei Sone | Junko Miyashita; Keiko Aikawa; Kazuko Shirakawa | Melodrama about a married woman having affairs with her sisters' boyfriends. |
| 1973-02-21 | Naked Resume: True Story of Kazuko Shirakawa 実録白川和子 裸の履歴書; Jitsuroku Shirakawa Kazuko: Hadaka no rirekisho | Chūsei Sone | Kazuko Shirakawa; Taiji Tonoyama | Fictitious documentary of actress Kazuko Shirakawa. Shirakawa's last film before temporary retirement for marriage. Junko Miyashita took over as Nikkatsu's reigning Queen. |
| 1973-02-21 | Secret of Concubine Palace Addendum: Convent's Gate of Lust (秘)大奥外伝 尼寺淫の門; Maruhi ōoku gaiden amadera in no mon | Katsuhiko Fujii | Setsuko Ogawa; Miki Hayashi | 7th in the Eros Schedule Book series. |
| 1973-03-03 | 女高生SEX暴力; Jokōsei sex bōryoku | Nobuaki Shirai | Yūko Katagiri | |
| 1973-03-03 | 妻三人 肌くらべ; Tsuma sannin: hadakurabe | Isao Hayashi | Hidemi Hara | |
| 1973-03-14 | Apartment Wife: Night of Pleasure 団地妻 歓喜の夜; Danchizuma Kanki no Yoru | Saburo Endo | Junko Miyashita; Masumi Jun | 7th in the Apartment Wife series |
| 1973-03-14 | Love Affair In Purgatory さいはての情事; Saihate no jōji | Keiichi Ozawa | Maki Kawamura; Keizō Kanie | Story of a widow who becomes romantically involved with a gang member. |
| 1973-03-24 | Lovers Are Wet 恋人たちは濡れた; Koibito-tachi wa nureta | Tatsumi Kumashiro | Rie Nakagawa; Toru Ohe | Major Kumashiro film about a young man who moves to a fishing village. |
| 1973-03-24 | Sweet Scent of Eros エロスは甘き香り; Eros wa amaki kaori | Toshiya Fujita | Hiroko Isayama; Kaori Momoi; Choei Takahashi | First Roman Porno film to intentionally delve into cult cinema and Theatre of the Absurd. |
| 1973-03-24 | 職業別SEX攻略法; Shokugyōbetsu sekkusu kōrya kuhō | Isao Hayashi | Hidemi Hara | |
| 1973-04-04 | Japan's Pleasure District: Three Sisters At a Turkish Bath にっぽん歓楽地帯 トルコ三姉妹; Nippon kanraku-chitai toruko sanshimai | Kōyū Ohara | Yūko Katagiri; Akimi Nijo; Keiko Aikawa | Three sisters living under the motto, "If you've got to be a prostitute, nothing's better than being a clean one." |
| 1973-04-04 | Afternoon Affair: Kyoto Holy Tapestry 昼下りの情事 古都曼陀羅; Hirusagari no jōji: koto-mandara | Masaru Konuma | Yuri Yamashina; Morio Kazama | First Roman Porno to use an S&M theme. |
| 1973-04-14 | Apartment Wife: Scent of a Woman 団地妻 女の匂い; Danchizuma: onna no nioi | Shinichi Shiratori | Junko Miyashita; Keiko Aikawa | 8th in the Apartment Wife series |
| 1973-04-14 | Prostitute Torture Hell (秘)女郎責め地獄; Maruhi: jorō seme jigoku | Noboru Tanaka | Rie Nakagawa; Yuri Yamashina; Hijiri Abe | 2nd in the Secret Chronicle trilogy. |
| 1973-04-25 | Confessions of an Adolescent Wife: Climax! おさな妻の告白 陶酔 クライマックス; Osanazuma no kokuhaku: tōsui climax! | Shōgorō Nishimura | Yūko Katagiri; Morio Kazama; Kunio Shimizu | 2nd film in the Confessions of an Adolescent Wife trilogy. |
| 1973-04-25 | Lessons In the Art of Sex: Majoring In Voyeurism 色道講座 のぞき専科; Shiki-do kōza: nozoki senka | Kazunari Takeda | Akemi Nijo; Masumi Jun; Go Awazu | Story of a voyeuristic pawnshop owner who converts his shop to a brothel in order to peep on his customers. Set in feudal times. |
| 1973-04-25 | Secret of Concubine Palace Addendum: Aphrodisiac Women Orgy (秘)大奥外伝 淫薬おんな狂乱; Maruhi ōoku gaiden inyaku onna kyōran | Yukihiko Kondo | Keiko Shijiki | 8th in the Eros Schedule Book series. |
| 1973-04-28 | 陽は沈み陽は昇る; Hi wa shizumi hi wa noboru | Koreyoshi Kurahara | Rosemary Dexter | |
| 1973-05-05 | (秘)温泉穴場さがし; Maruhi onsen anaba sagashi | Isao Hayashi | Junko Miyashita | |
| 1973-05-05 | 女子大生SEX方程式 同棲; Joshidaisei sex hōteishiki: dōsei | Kōyū Ohara | Hitomi Kozue; Mari Tanaka | |
| 1973-05-23 | Woods Are Wet: Woman Hell 女地獄 森は濡れた; Onna jigoku: mori wa nureta | Tatsumi Kumashiro | Hiroko Isayama; Rie Nakagawa; Hatsuo Yamaya | Based on DeSade's Justine, set in contemporary Japan. |
| 1973-05-23 | 女高生 肉体暴力; Jokōsei nikutai bōryoku | Yukihiko Kondo | Yuri Yamashina | |
| 1973-05-23 | Love Affair On a Rainy Night 雨の夜の情事; Ame no yo no jōji | Shinichi Shiratori | Junko Miyashita; Moeko Ezawa; Hirokazu Inoue | Story of a man who marries the wife of a man he hit in an automobile accident. |
| 1973-05-31 | Delinquent Girl: Alleycat In Heat 不良少女 野良猫の性春; Furyo shōjo: noraneko no seishun | Chūsei Sone | Yūko Katagiri; Setsuko Ohyama; Hideaki Ezumi | Story of a girl who becomes a prostitute for the yakuza. |
| 1973-06-02 | Love Hunter: Lust 恋の狩人 欲望; Koi no karyūdo: yokubō | Seiichiro Yamaguchi | Mari Tanaka; Teruo Matsuyama; Aya Ichida | Sequel to Love Hunter (1972) |
| 1973-06-13 | New Eros Schedule Book Concubine Secrets: Sexual Technique Education 新色暦大奥秘話 愛戯お仕込処; Shin irogoyomi ōoku hiwa: aigi oshikomi-dokoro | Katsuhiko Fujii | Setsuko Ogawa | 6th in the Eros Schedule Book series. |
| 1973-06-13 | （秘）穴場情報 牝馬の吐息; Maruhi anaba johō: hinba no toiki | Saburo Endo | Junko Miyashita | |
| 1973-06-23 | 怨歌情死考 傷だらけの花弁; Enka jōshikō: kizudarake no kaben | Kōyū Ohara | Setsuko Ogawa | |
| 1973-06-23 | 外人妻; Gaijin tsuma | Nobuaki Shirai | サラ・バーネット | |
| 1973-06-23 | Retreat Through the Wet Wasteland 濡れた荒野を走れ; Nureta koya o hashire | Yukihiro Sawada | Takeo Chii; Yuri Yamashina; Maki Kawamura | A ground-breaking, nihilistic drama about police brutality. Many critics trace the birth of the anti-hero in Japanese cinema to this film. |
| 1973-07-04 | Showa Woman: Naked Rashomon 昭和おんなみち 裸性門; Showa onnamichi: rashōmon | Chūsei Sone | Hitomi Kozue; Hideaki Ezumi | A surrealistic historical drama scripted by Atsushi Yamatoya. Considered Sone's major, neglected film. |
| 1973-07-04 | Apartment Wife: Playing with Fire 団地妻 火遊び; Danchizuma hiasobi | Shōgorō Nishimura | Junko Miyashita; Katsuo Yamada | 9th in the Apartment Wife series |
| 1973-07-07 | 淫獣の宿; Injū no yado | Shōgorō Nishimura | インゲル・サンド バール・ヤンソン | |
| 1973-07-14 | Yakuza Goddess: Lust and Honor やくざ観音 情女仁義; Yakuza kannon: ito jingi | Tatsumi Kumashiro | Jiro Okazaki; Nozomi Yasuda | Story of a monk who must come to terms with his past. |
| 1973-07-14 | Midnight Fairy 真夜中の妖精; Mayonaka no yōsei | Noboru Tanaka | Yuri Yamashina; Morio Kazama; Setsuko Ohyama | Story of a man infatuated with a woman about to be married, and his attempts to spoil her wedding. |
| 1973-07-14 | Sex War 必殺色仕掛け; Hissatsu irojikake | Katsuhiko Fujii | Akemi Nijo; Ayako Ichikawa; Reiko Maki | Story involving competition between brothels during the early Showa era. |
| 1973-07-25 | Sanctuary In the Night 夜の禁猟区; Yoru no kinryō-ku | Keiichi Ozawa | Hitomi Kozue; Ayako Ichikawa; Hyoe Enoki | A girl rescues a terrorist, falls in love with him, and he has an affair with her sister. |
| 1973-07-25 | Love Makes Me Wet 愛に濡れたわたし; Ai ni nureta watashi | Akira Katō | Junko Miyashita; Risa Aoki; Yasuhiko Ishizu | A highly praised, erotic, surrealistic film. |
| 1973-08-04 | Erotic Journey: Love Affair In Hong Kong 色情旅行 香港慕情; Shikijō ryokō: Hong Kong Bojō | Masaru Konuma | Setsuko Ogawa; Yūko Katagiri; Junko Miyashita | A higher-budget satire of Nikkatsu's 1960s action films, featuring Nikkatsu's 3 biggest stars of the time. |
| 1973-08-04 | 女子大生 SEX夏期ゼミナール; Joshidaisei: sex kaki seminaaru | Isao Hayashi | Nozomi Yasuda | |
| 1973-08-15 | Sex-Crime Coast: School of Piranha 肉体犯罪海岸 －ピラニアの群れ; Nikutai hanzai kaigan: piranha no mure | Shōgorō Nishimura | Hitomi Kozue; Masumi Jun; Ryoji Nakamura | Violent story of male and female gangs at a beach resort town. Film students consider this a turning point in Nishimura's career, for the worse. |
| 1973-08-15 | Sex Report From a Female Private Detective: Housewife Prostitution 女調査員SEXレポート 主婦売春; Jochōsain sex report: shufu baishun | Shinichi Shiratori | Naomi Oka; Yuri Yamashina; Junko Miyashita | Story of Honey Ohara, female P.I. discovering housewife prostitution while investigating a divorce case. |
| 1973-08-15 | (秘)商社情報 女買い占め売り惜しみ; Maruhi shōshajōhō onna kaishime urioshimi | Nobuaki Shirai | Reiko Maki | |
| 1973-08-25 | Secret Chronicle: Crimson Goddess In Paradise (秘)極楽紅弁天; Maruhi: gokuraku aka-benten | Chūsei Sone | Yūko Katagiri; Meika Seri; Ryo Yamamoto | 3rd in the Secret Chronicle trilogy. |
| 1973-08-25 | Female Teacher: Private Life 女教師 私生活; Onna kyōshi: shiseikatsu | Noboru Tanaka | Ayako Ichikawa; Morio Kazama; Hitomi Kozue | First of two-part film from winning script submitted in a talent contest. Scriptwriter Mari Abe won a cash prize and college scholarship, and the film inspired an eight-part series. |
| 1973-09-12 | Legend of the Sex Thief In Edo 大江戸性盗伝 －女斬り; Ōedo seitō-den onnagiri | Katsuhiko Fujii | Setsuko Ogawa; Hideaki Ezumi; Junko Miyashita | Historical drama involving a ronin and a kidnapped wife. |
| 1973-09-12 | Shinjuku Love Hotel: Secret Weekend Paradise 新宿ラブ・ホテル 週末(秘)天国; Shinjuku love hotel: shūmatsu maruhi tengoku | Saburo Endo | Reiko Maki; Setsuko Ohyama; Kaoru Hazuki | Antics at a bath house during school break. |
| 1973-09-22 | 密のしたたり; Mitsunoshitatari | Akira Katō | ソルベイ・アンダーソン ペーデル・シンバーリ | |
| 1973-09-22 | True Story of Sex and Violence In a Female High School 番格 女子高校生のSEXと暴力の実態; Bankaku joshikōkōsei no sex to bōryoku no jittai | Koretsugu Kurahara | Hitomi Kozue; Naomi Oka; Noriko Igarashi | A sukeban (girl gang) story. |
| 1973-10-05 | Wandering Seagull: Night In Kushiro さすらいかもめ －釧路の夜; Sasurai kamome: kushiro no yoru | Shōgorō Nishimura | Yūko Katagiri; Junko Miyashita; Toshihiko Oda | Nikkatsu's two top stars of the day. Katagiri's last starring role. |
| 1973-10-05 | 実話ポルノ事件簿 結婚詐欺; Jitsuwa poruno jikenbo: kekkon sagi | Yukihiko Kondo | Yūko Katagiri; Keiko Shijiki | |
| 1973-10-05 | 性豪列伝 夜の牝馬ならし; Seigōretsuden: yoru no hinba narashi | Isao Hayashi | Masumi Jun | |
| 1973-10-24 | (秘)女郎残酷色地獄; Maruhi jorō zankoku shokujigoku | Shinichi Shiratori | Rie Nakagawa | |
| 1973-10-24 | 人妻 －残り火－ Hitozuma -nokoribi- | Tadahiko Isomi | Junko Miyashita | |
| 1973-11-03 | The World of Geisha a.k.a. A Man and a Woman Behind the Fusuma Screen 四畳半襖の裏張り; Yojōhan fusuma no urahari | Tatsumi Kumashiro | Junko Miyashita; Naomi Oka | Highly successful film based on an anonymous erotic novel (subsequently ascribed to Nagai Kafu) about geisha. Set in tumultuous 1918 Japan. |
| 1973-11-03 | 女子大生 偽処女; Joshidaisei: nise shojo | Nobuaki Shirai | Masumi Jun | |
| 1973-11-20 | Sex Education Mistresses 性教育ママ; Sei-kyōiku mama | Akira Katō | Michiko Tsukasa; Masumi Jun; Rie Nakagawa; Yūko Katagiri | Story of 4 sexually frustrated wives in an apartment complex who pick up teenaged boys. Significant for former star, Yūko Katagiri's 4th-billing, her first non-starring role. |
| 1973-11-20 | Sigh ためいき; Tameiki | Chūsei Sone | Yumiko Tatsuno; Aoi Nakajima | Story of a virgin who becomes sexually voracious after being molested on a train. Nikkatsu's first film based on the work of Kōichirō Uno. |
| 1973-12-05 | Office Lady Journal: Poaching; OL日記 密漁 あさる; OL nikki: mitsuryō Asaru | Katsuhiko Fujii | Hitomi Kozue; Junko Miyashita | 3rd in the Office Lady Journal series |
| 1973-12-05 | Female Teacher: Sweet Life 女教師 甘い生活; Onna kyōshi: amai seikatsu | Masaru Konuma | Ayako Ichikawa; Aoi Nakajima; Nozomi Yasuda | 2nd part of the 2-part film starting with Female Teacher: Private Life (1973). Script submitted in a talent contest. |
| 1973-12-15 | Season of Lust: A Trail of Honey From an 18 Year Old 欲情の季節 密をぬる18才; Yokujō no kisetsu: mitsu o nuru 18-sai | Kazunari Takeda | Hitomi Kozue; Aoi Nakajima | Story of a woman with the ability to cure impotency in men. |
| 1973-12-15 | 女調査員SEXレポート 婦女暴行; Jochōsain sex report: fujo bōkō | Yukihiko Kondo | Ayako Ichikawa | |
| 1973-12-15 | Trapped in Lust 愛欲の罠; Aiyoku no Wana | Atsushi Yamatoya | Genjirō Arato; Nozomi Yasuda; Rie Nakagawa; Moeko Ezawa | |
| 1973-12-26 | Kanto County Sex Unit バンカク 関東SEX軍団; Bankaku: Kantō sex gundan | Keiichi Ozawa | Noriko Igarashi; Michi Aoyama; Shoji Ohki | Informal sequel to True Story of Sex and Violence in a Female High School (1973) |
| 1973-12-26 | Crazy Season 狂棲時代; Kyōsei jidai | Shinichi Shiratori | Yuri Yamashma; Michiko Tsukasa; Moeko Ezawa | A remake of Kōji Wakamatsu's controversial Skeleton In the Closet (1965). |

== 1974 ==
| Release date | Title | Director | Cast | Notes |
|---|---|---|---|---|
1974
| 1974-01-03 | Wet Lust: 21 Strippers 濡れた欲情 特出し21人; Nureta Yokujo: Tokudashi 21-nin | Tatsumi Kumashiro | Yūko Katagiri; Yoshinori Furukawa; Meika Seri | Highly praised, informal sequel to Ichijo's Wet Lust (1972). Successful come-back for Katagiri. |
| 1974-01-03 | Concubine Secrets: Glorious Sex Scroll 大奥秘話 晴姿姫ごと絵巻; Ooku Hiwa Haresugata Himegoto-emaki | Isao Hayashi | | 9th and last of the Eros Schedule Book series |
| 1974-01-15 | Apartment Wife: Afternoon Seduction 団地妻 昼下りの誘惑 - Danchizuma Hirusagari no Yuuwaku | Shōgorō Nishimura | Junko Miyashita; Moeko Ezawa | 10th in the Apartment Wife series |
| 1974-01-15 | Confessions of An Adolescent Wife: Ecstasy! おさな妻の告白 失神 エクスタシー; Osanazuma no Kokuhaku: Shisshin! | Tadahiko Isomi | Yumiko Tatsuno; Ayako Ichikawa; Hirokazu Inoue | Last film in the Confessions of An Adolescent Wife trilogy. |
| 1974-01-26 | Professional Sex Performers: A Docu-Drama 実録エロ事師たち; Jitsuroku Erogotoshitachi | Chūsei Sone | Akemi Nijo; Taiji Tonoyama; Mariko Hoshi | A come-back hit for Chūsei Sone, after several misses. Nikkatsu would continue the "Docudrama" format due to the success of this film. |
| 1974-01-26 | Secret of the College Girls: Part-Time Sex Pros (秘)女子大生 SEXアルバイト; Maruhi Joshidaisei: Sex Arbeit | Kōyū Ohara | Masumi Jun; Hitomi Kozue; Reiko Maki | Informal sequel to College Girls: Sex Equation (1972). Allmovie compares it to an episode of I Love Lucy with nudity. |
| 1974-01-26 | セミドキュメント スケバン用心棒; Semidokyumento: sukeban yōjinbō | Tadashi Sasaki | Noriko Igarashi | |
| 1974-02-06 | Gypsy Rose: A Docu-Drama 実録ジプシー・ローズ; Jitsuroku: Gypsy Rose | Shōgorō Nishimura | Maya Hiromi; Nagatoshi Sakamoto; Akimi Nijo | True story of Japanese stripper Gypsy Rose (formerly Rose Marie), who died in 1967. Dark and gritty, the film was an unexpected major success. |
| 1974-02-06 | Office Lady Journal: Wet Bundle; OL日記 濡れた札束; OL Nikki: Nureta Satsutaba | Akira Katō | Aoi Nakajima; Moeko Ezawa; Kazuki Doshita | 4th in the Office Lady Journal series |
| 1974-02-16 | Man and Woman Behind the Fusuma Screen: Enduring Skin 四畳半襖の裏張り しのび肌; Yojo-han Fusuma no Urabari: Shinobi Hada | Tatsumi Kumashiro | Junko Miyashita; Hideaki Ezumi; Naomi Oka | Informal sequel to Man and Woman Behind the Fusuma Screen (1973). Known for introducing the term are ("that") for sex, a euphemism still in use. |
| 1974-02-16 | Sigh 2 続ためいき; Zoku Tameiki | Chūsei Sone | Hitomi Kozue; Rokko Toura | Sequel to Sigh (1973). |
| 1974-03-02 | 女子大生 かりそめの妻; Joshi daisei: karisome no tsuma | Kazunari Takeda | Mariko Hoshi | |
| 1974-03-02 | White Whore 白い娼婦 花芯のたかまり; Kashin no Takamari | Masaru Konuma | Yuri Yamashina; Misa Aoyama; Toru Ohe | |
| 1974-03-13 | Office Lady Journal: Ruined Lust; OL日記 ちぎれた愛欲; OL Nikki: Chigireta Aiyoku | Asao Kuwayama | Hitomi Kozue; Nozomi Yasuda | 5th in the Office Lady Journal series. |
| 1974-03-13 | 昼下りの情事 噂の看護婦; Hirusagari no jōji: uwasa no kangofu | Katsuhiko Fujii | 美理恭子 | |
| 1974-04-09 | 実録エロ事師たち 巡業花電車; Jitsuroku erogotoshitachi: jungyō hanadensha | Isao Hayashi | Mariko Hoshi | |
| 1974-04-09 | 日本モーテルエロチカ 回転ベッドの女; Nihon mōteru erochika: kaiten betto no onna | Nobuaki Shirai | Masumi Jun | |
| 1974-04-20 | Sukeban Deka: Dirty Mary すけばん刑事 ダーティ・マリー; Sukeban Deka: Dirty Mary | Yasuharu Hasebe | Hitomi Azusa; Yuri Yamashina; Junko Miyashita | Unrelated to the later Sukeban Deka series. An hommage to Clint Eastwood's "Dirty Harry" character. A failure on release, its reputation has grown in recent years. |
| 1974-05-04 | Key 鍵 Kagi | Tatsumi Kumashiro | Hideo Kanze; Yuki Aresa; Tokuko Watanabe | Unsuccessful adaptation of a Jun'ichirō Tanizaki novel. |
| 1974-05-04 | Lost Love: Oil Hell ロスト・ラブ －あぶら地獄－ Lost Love: Abura Jigoku | Masaru Konuma | Akari Uchida; Tetsuo Tomikawa; Kazuko Tajima | An unsuccessful film by top Roman Porno director, Komuma. |
| 1974-06-08 | 卓のチョンチョン; Taku no chonchon | Isao Hayashi／Nobuaki Shirai | Mariko Hoshi | |
| 1974-06-08 | Man & Woman Sexology: Private Lessons 男女性事学 個人授業; Danjo Seiji-gaku: Kojin Jugyo | Kōyū Ohara | Rie Nakagawa; Asuka Seri; Fumihito Tajiri | Unsuccessful film for director Kōyū Ohara. A low-humor sex film at odds with his usual style. |
| 1974-06-22 | Last Day of the Red Light District: March 31, 1958 aka The Last Whorehouse 赤線最後の日 昭和33年3月31日; Akasen Saigo no Hi: Showa 33-nen 31-nichi | Shinichi Shiratori | Junko Miyashita; Aoi Nakajima; Meika Seri | Story of the end of legal prostitution in Japan. |
| 1974-06-22 | Flower and Snake 花と蛇; Hana to Hebi | Masaru Konuma | Naomi Tani; Yasuhiko Ishizu; Nagatoshi Sakamoto | Naomi Tani's first starring role for Nikkatsu. First pure S/M Roman Porno. |
| 1974-07-06 | 秘本 乱れ雲; Hihon: midaregumo | Shōgorō Nishimura | Jun Midorikawa | |
| 1974-07-06 | Secret Book: Turbulent Cloud; SEXハイウェイ 女の駐車場; Hihon: Midaregumo | Tadahiko Isomi | Jun Midorikawa; Yuri Yamashina; Junko Miyashita | First film in the Secret Book trilogy. |
| 1974-07-20 | ふるさとポルノ記 津軽シコシコ節; Furusato porunoki: tsugaru shikoshiko bushi | Nobuaki Shirai | Maki Kawamura | |
| 1974-07-20 | New Apartment Wife: Afternoon Beast 新・団地妻 けものの昼下り - Shin Danchizuma Kemono no Hirusagari | Akira Katō | Junko Miyashita; Akira Hanagami | 11th in the Apartment Wife series. |
| 1974-08-03 | カルーセル麻紀 夜は私を濡らす; Karūserumaki: yoru wa watashi o nurasu | Shōgorō Nishimura | カルーセル麻紀 | |
| 1974-08-03 | Female Ninja Magic: 100 Trampled Flowers くノ一淫法 百花卍がらみ; Kunoichi ninpo: hyakka manji-garimi | Chūsei Sone | Junko Miyashita; Kyoko Kano; Hitomi Kozue; Yūko Katagiri | Historical action pink film involving female ninjas with supernatural sexual powers. |
| 1974-08-14 | 黒い牝豹M; Kuroi mehyō emu | Koretsugu Kurahara | Reiko Ike | |
| 1974-08-14 | 妹 Imōto | Toshiya Fujita | Kumiko Akiyoshi | |
| 1974-08-28 | Modern Prostitution: Lust Under a Uniform 現代娼婦考 制服の下のうずき; Gendai Shofu-ko: Seifuku no Shita no Uzuki | Chūsei Sone | Masumi Jun; Mariko Hoshi | A minor film from director Sone's mid-career slump period. |
| 1974-08-28 | Kaoru Kiri: The Best Lesbian In Japan, a Docu-Drama 実録桐かおる －にっぽん一のレズビアン－ Jitsuroku Kiri Kaoru: Nipponichi no Lesbian | Katsuhiko Fujii | Kaoru Kiri; Tomi Kasuga | Story of the star of a lesbian strip show and her romantic entanglements. |
| 1974-09-11 | Bawdy Tales of Edo: Octopus & Sea Shell 江戸艶笑夜話 蛸と赤貝 - Edo Ensho Yawa: Tako to Akagai | Atsushi Fujiura | Setsuko Ogawa; KC (Casey) Takamine | Director Atsushi Fujiura's first Roman Porno. |
| 1974-09-11 | Secret Chronicle: She-Beast Market aka Lusty Beast Market (秘)色情めす市場 - Maruhi: Shikijo Mesu Ichiba | Noboru Tanaka | Meika Seri; Genshu Hanayagi; Junko Miyashita | Last film in the Secret Chronicle trilogy. Praised by mainstream critics for Tanaka's innovative camerawork and unusual casting. |
| 1974-09-21 | Red Light District: Gonna Get Out 赤線玉の井 ぬけられます; Akasen Tamanoi: Nukeraremasu | Tatsumi Kumashiro | Junko Miyashita; Keizō Kanie; Naomi Oka | A pink film version on Kenji Mizoguchi's Street of Shame (1956) about four prostitutes in the era before prostitution was made illegal in Japan. Critically praised for the use of manga-artist Yu Takida's original drawings. |
| 1974-10-05 | Morning Frenzy 狂乱の喘ぎ; Kyoran no Aegi | Shōgorō Nishimura | Maya Hiromi; Hitomi Kozue; Toshihiko Oda | An unsuccessful effort at mixing Roman Porno with film-noirish melodrama. |
| 1974-10-05 | 花嫁は濡れていた; Hana yome wa nureteita | Yukihiko Kondo | Osamu Tsuruoka | |
| 1974-10-26 | Secret Book: Sleeve and Sleeve 秘本 袖と袖; Hihon: Sode to Sode | Akira Katō | Junko Miyashita; Morio Kazama; Hitomi Kozue | 2nd film in the Secret Book trilogy. |
| 1974-10-26 | Wife to be Sacrificed 生贄夫人; Ikenie Fujin | Masaru Konuma | Naomi Tani; Nagatoshi Sakamoto; Terumi Azuma | A huge hit, among Nikkatsu's five most successful films of all time. Established the S/M genre in Roman Porno, and Naomi Tani as the 3rd "Nikkatsu Queen". |
| 1974-11-09 | Orgasms: Bath House Secret Techniques トルコ風呂(秘)昇天; Toruko-buro Maruhi Shoten | Isao Hayashi | Masumi Jun; Yuri Yamashina | Story of the competition between prostitutes at a bath house. |
| 1974-11-02 | あばよダチ公; Abayo dachikō | Yukihiro Sawada | Yusaku Matsuda | |
| 1974-11-02 | Virgin Blues バージンブルース; Baajin burūsu | Toshiya Fujita | Kumiko Akiyoshi | |
| 1974-12-07 | 制服の処女 男狂い; Seifuku no shojo: otokogurui | Saburo Endo | Kyoko Naito | |
| 1974-12-07 | Boso Rhythm: Thank God For Women 房総ペコペコ節おんな万祝; Boso Pekopeko-bushi: Onna Maiwai | Nobuaki Shirai | Mariko Hoshi; Kenzo Shibuya; Yuri Yamashina | Humorous story of a sex festival in a mountain village. |
| 1974-12-28 | 炎の肖像; Honō no shōzō | 藤田敏八 加藤彰 | Kumiko Akiyoshi | |
| 1974-12-28 | Evening Primrose / Flower Waiting for the Night 宵待草; Yoimachigusa | Tatsumi Kumashiro | Kumiko Akiyoshi | |

== 1975 ==
| Release date | Title | Director | Cast | Notes |
|---|---|---|---|---|
1975
| 1975-01-14 | Secret Book: Peeled Egg 秘本むき玉子; Hihon: Muki Tamago | Shōgorō Nishimura | Hitomi Kozue; Mariko Hoshi; Junko Miyashita | Last film in the Secret Book trilogy. |
| 1975-01-14 | 実録 元祖マナ板ショー; Jitsuroku: ganso mana itashō | Katsuhiko Fujii | Yuri Yamashina | |
| 1975-01-25 | Red Light District: Woman In the Honmoku Brothel 赤線本牧チャブヤの女; Akasen Honmoku Chabuya no Onna | Shinichi Shiratori | Maya Hiromi; Yūko Katagiri | Story of a prostitute in the pre-war years. Released in the U.S. ca. 1980 as Yokohama Chophouse Women |
| 1975-01-25 | Teenagers' Sex Journal '75 十代の性典'75; Judai no Seiten '75 | Yukihiko Kondo | Yoko Asakura; Kiyoyasu Adachi; Kyoko Naito | A youth-oriented pink film. |
| 1975-02-08 | A Woman Called Sada Abe 実録阿部定; Jitsuroku: Abe Sada | Noboru Tanaka | Junko Miyashita; Hideaki Ezumi; Nagatoshi Sakamoto | The Sada Abe story. Overshadowed internationally by Oshima's In the Realm of the Senses (1976), this is called Tanaka's masterpiece, and is considered one of the best Roman Pornos. |
| 1975-02-19 | New Apartment Wife: Prostitution In Building #113 新・団地妻 売春グループ13号館 - Shin Danchizuma Baishun Gurupu 13-Gokan | Shōgorō Nishimura | Rumi Tama; Hidetoshi Kageyama | 12th in the Apartment Wife series. Rumi Tama's first Apartment Wife, taking over from Junko Miyashita as the 4th star of the series. |
| 1975-02-19 | Lesbian World: Ecstasy レスビアンの世界 －恍惚－ Lesbian no Sekai: Koukotsu | Masaru Konuma | Mihoko Arikawa; Maki Kawamura; Naomi Oka | First film in the Lesbian World trilogy. |
| 1975-03-05 | The Rose and the Whip 薔薇と鞭; Bara to Muchi | Saburo Endo | Akemi Nijo; Hirokazu Inoue; Yuri Yamashina | S&M story of a successful female photographer and her husband. |
| 1975-03-05 | True Story of a Woman In Jail: Sex Hell 実録おんな鑑別所 性地獄; Jitsuroku Onna Kanbetsusho: Sei-jigoku | Kōyū Ohara | Hitomi Kozue; Meika Seri; Maya Hiromi | First film in the True Story of a Woman In Jail women in prison trilogy. |
| 1975-03-19 | トルコ（秘）悶絶; Toruko maruhi monzetsu | Isao Hayashi | Maya Hiromi | |
| 1975-04-01 | 襟裳岬; Erimomisaki | Akira Katō | Izumi Yamaguchi | |
| 1975-04-12 | Love Doll Report: An Adult Toy 大人のオモチャ ダッチワイフ・レポート; Otona no Omocha: Dacchi Waifu Report | Chūsei Sone | Maya Hiromi; Naomi Oka; Nobutaka Masutomi | A doctor develops a sex-doll robot for researchers staying at the South Pole. Scripted by Atsushi Yamatoya. |
| 1975-04-12 | 女子大生 モーテル歌麿遊び; Joshidaisei moteru tamaro asobi | Tadahiko Isomi | Maya Hiromi | |
| 1975-04-26 | Housewife's Experience: Tenement 主婦の体験レポート おんなの四畳半; Shufu no Taiken Report: Onna no Yo-jo-han | Kazunari Takeda | Akane Kawasaki; Junko Miyashita; Taiji Tonoyama | First film in Takeda's successful Housewife's Experience series. |
| 1975-04-26 | Cruelty: Black Rose Torture 残酷 黒薔薇私刑; Zankoku: Kurobara Lynch | Katsuhiko Fujii | Naomi Tani | S&M drama set in the period prior to World War II, with Naomi Tani suffering indignities from the military police. |
| 1975-05-10 | Red Light Tobita Brothel 赤線飛田遊廓; Akasen Tobita Yukaku | Shōgorō Nishimura | Yūko Katagiri; Mariko Hoshi; Setsuko Ohyama | |
| 1975-05-17 | New Apartment Wife: Blue Film Woman 新・団地妻 ブルーフィルムの女; Shin Danchizuma Blue Film no Onna | Isao Hayashi | Rumi Tama; Hirokazu Inoue | 13th in the Apartment Wife series Scripted by Rumi Tama's husband, retired pink film director Akitaka Kimata |
| 1975-05-17 | 信州シコシコ節 温泉芸者VSお座敷ストリッパー; Shinshū shikoshiko bushi onsen geisha buiesu ozashiki sutorippaa | Nobuaki Shirai | Reiko Akitsu | |
| 1975-06-04 | Lesbian World: Fondling 続・レスビアンの世界 －愛撫－ Zoku Lesbian no Sekai: Aibu | Chūsei Sone | Maki Mizuno; Yuri Yamashina; Hinako Ito | 2nd film in the Lesbian World trilogy. |
| 1975-06-04 | Female Teacher: Boy Hunt 女教師 少年狩り; Onna Kyoshi: Shonen-gari | Masaru Konuma | Maya Hiromi; Akira Takahashi; Kiyoyasu Adachi | Story of a female teacher at a boys' high school. Unrelated to the previous two Female Teacher films, followed by Female Teacher: Cherry Boy Hunt (1976). |
| 1975-06-18 | Oryu's Passion: Bondage Skin お柳情炎 縛り肌; Oryū jōen: shibari hada | Katsuhiko Fujii | Naomi Tani; Terumi Azuma; Morio Kazama | Story of the yakuza in Osaka during the 1920s. |
| 1975-06-18 | トルコ風呂(秘)外伝 尼僧極楽; Toruko buro maruhi gaiden: nisō gokuraku | Shinichi Shiratori | Naomi Oka | |
| 1975-07-01 | Tokyo Emmanuelle 東京エマニエル夫人; Tokyo Emanieru Fujin | Akira Katō | Kumi Taguchi; Fujio Murakami; Naka Fuyuki; Mitsuyasu Maeno | |
| 1975-07-01 | True Story of a Woman In Jail Continues 続実録おんな鑑別所; Zoku Jitsuroku Onna Kanbetsusho | Kōyū Ohara | Hitomi Kozue; Mihoko Arikawa; Kumi Natsuki | 2nd film in the True Story of a Woman In Jail women in prison trilogy. |
| 1975-07-23 | Housewife's Experience: Tenement Apartment, the Sequel 主婦の体験レポート 続おんなの四畳半; Shufu no Taiken Report: Zoku Onna no Yo-jo-han | Kazunari Takeda | Junko Miyashita; Taiji Tonoyama; Kimihiro Hiraizumi | 2nd film in Takeda's successful Housewife's Experience series. |
| 1975-07-23 | Cruel High School Girl Sex Lynch 残酷 女高生(性)私刑; Zankoku Jokyōsei (Sei) Lynch | Isao Hayashi | Naomi Tani; Terumi Azuma | |
| 1975-08-09 | Trembling わななき; Wananaki | Shōgorō Nishimura | Kaori Taniguchi; Nobuji Takeuchi; Akira Takahashi | Sex comedy based on a novel by Koichiro Uno. Inspired the Koichiro Uno series of filmed novels. |
| 1975-08-09 | Black Rose Ascension 黒薔薇昇天; Kurobara Shoten | Tatsumi Kumashiro | Naomi Tani; Terumi Azuma; Meika Seri | Combination semi-autobiography and satire of Nagisa Oshima by Kumashiro. The life of a pink film director. |
| 1975-08-23 | レズビアンの女王 続・桐かおる; Rezubian no joō: zoku * Kiri Kaoru | Katsuhiko Fujii | Kaoru Kiri | |
| 1975-08-23 | 100 High School Girls: Secret Motel Report 女高生100人 (秘)モーテル白書; Jokosei 100-nin: Maruhi Motel Hakusho | Chūsei Sone | Rei Okamoto; Yoko Asakura; Tamaki Katsura | A minor Sone film about romance at a girls high school. |
| 1975-09-06 | Female Diver's Secret Report: Ecstasy (秘)海女レポート 淫絶; Maruhi Ama Report: Monzetsu | Yukihiko Kondo | Rie Tachibana; Maki Higuchi; Yasuhiko Ishizu | Nude women under water. Inspired the Nasty Diver series. |
| 1975-09-06 | Office Lady Journal: Indecent Relations; OL日記 猥褻な関係; OL Nikki: Waisetsuna Kankei | Nobuaki Shirai | Akemi Nijo; Junko Miyashita | 6th in the Office Lady Journal series |
| 1975-09-20 | Lady Kamakura: Cherry Boy Club 鎌倉夫人 童貞倶楽部; Kamakura Fujin: Dotei Club | Isao Hayashi | Junko Miyashita; Akiko Yoshii; Tatsuya Hamaguchi | Story of a sexually frustrated wife who has sex with Buddhist seminary students while her husband is overseas. |
| 1975-09-20 | トルコ(秘)最前線 －密技96手－ Toruko maruhi saizensen: -mitsugi 96 te - | Saburo Endo | Yūko Katagiri | |
| 1975-10-04 | Nurses' Secret Chart: Randy White Uniforms 看護婦(秘)カルテ 白い制服の悶え; Kangofu Maruhi Karte: Shiroi Seifuku no Modae | Akihiko Yatsumaki | Maki Mizuno; Naomi Oka | Nurses with special sexual skills work at a hospital for curing impotence. |
| 1975-10-04 | New Lesbian World: Rapture 新・レスビアンの世界 －陶酔－ Shin Lesbian no Sekai: Tosui | Shōgorō Nishimura | Hiromi Igarashi; Akemi Nijo; Yuri Yamashina | Last film in the Lesbian World trilogy. |
| 1975-10-18 | Great Edo: Secret Story of a Female Doctor In Trouble 大江戸 (秘)おんな医者あらし; Oedo: Maruhi Onna Isha Arashi | Masaru Konuma | Yūko Katagiri; Moeko Ezawa; Junko Miyashita | A sex-farce set at an abortion clinic in the Edo era. |
| 1975-10-18 | Hostess Confidential: Three Juicy Sisters ホステス情報 潮ふき三姉妹; Hostess Joho: Shiofuki Sanshimai | Chūsei Sone | Rei Okamoto; Naomi Oka; Tamaki Katsura | Minor film from Sone about three sisters working as prostitutes. |
| 1975-11-01 | Tokyo Emanuelle: Private Lessons 東京エマニエル夫人 個人教授; Tokyo Emanuelle Fujin: Kojin Kyoju | Katsuhiko Fujii | Kumi Taguchi; Midori Ohtani | Sequel to Tokyo Emanuelle (1975) |
| 1975-11-01 | White Female Cat: Ecstasy At High Noon 白い牝猫 真昼のエクスタシー; Shiroi Mesuneko: Mahiru no Ecstasy | Kōyū Ohara | Hitomi Kozue; Rie Tachibana; Shunsuke Nago | A pop-art Roman porn from director Ohara, about a motorcycle gang. |
| 1975-11-22 | New Apartment Wife: Swapping 新・団地妻 夫婦交換; Shin Danchizuma Swapping | Shinichi Shiratori | Aoi Nakajima; Hirokazu Inoue | 14th in the Apartment Wife series |
| 1975-11-22 | Banned Book: Flesh Futon 発禁 肉蒲団; Hakkin Nikubuton | Nobuaki Shirai | Terumi Azuma | An unsuccessful sex-screwball-comedy about a writer of pornography. Script by Atsushi Yamatoya. |
| 1975-12-06 | Newlywed Hell 新妻地獄; Niizuma jigoku | Akira Katō | Naomi Tani; Terumi Azuma | |
| 1975-12-24 | Wet Lust: Opening the Tulip 濡れた欲情 ひらけ！チューリップ; Nureta Yokujo: Hirake! Tulip | Tatsumi Kumashiro | Masami Ishii; Kiyoyasu Adachi; Kanpei Hazama | A humorous Roman porn set in a pachinko parlor. A minor film for Kumashiro. |
| 1975-12-24 | Housewife's Experience: New Tenement Apartment 主婦の体験レポート 新・おんなの四畳半; Shufu no Taiken Report: Shin Onna no Yo-jo-han | Kazunari Takeda | Junko Miyashita; Tamaki Katsura; Kyoko Naito | Last film in Takeda's successful Housewife's Experience series. |

== 1976 ==
| Release date | Title | Director | Cast | Notes |
|---|---|---|---|---|
1976
| 1976-01-08 | Cloistered Nun: Runa's Confession 修道女ルナの告白; Shudojo Runa no Kokuhaku | Masaru Konuma | Runa Takamura; Aoi Nakajima; Kumi Taguchi | A story of S&M, rape and other sexual goings-on at a Catholic convent. Pop-singer Runa Takamura's film debut. |
| 1976-01-08 | Lady Ecstasy: Pleasure Profound aka Housewife In Prison aka Madame Ecstasy 淫絶夫人 快楽の奥; Inzetsu Fujin: Kairaku no Oku | Shōgorō Nishimura | Rumi Tama; Rei Okamoto | Story of a sexually voracious female assistant professor. |
| 1976-01-24 | New True Story of Woman Condemned to Hell 新・実録おんな鑑別所 －恋獄－ Shin Jitsuroku Onna Kanbetsusho Rengoku | Kōyū Ohara | Hitomi Kozue; Yuri Yamashina; Naomi Oka | Last film in the True Story of a Woman in Jail women in prison trilogy. |
| 1976-01-24 | Koichiro Uno's Up & Wet 宇能鴻一郎の濡れて立つ; Uno Koichiro no Nurete Tatsu | Akira Katō | Terumi Azuma; Tsuyoshi Kubo | First film in the 23-film series of humorous sex stories by Koichiro Uno. Lighter in tone than most Roman Pornos, and focusing on strong female lead characters, they were called "Pornography for women". |
| 1976-02-07 | Rape! 犯す！ Okasu! | Yasuharu Hasebe | Natsuko Yashiro; Keizō Kanie; Naomi Tani; Rei Okamoto | First film in the "violent pink" genre. |
| 1976-02-07 | SEX野郎 (秘)移動売春 | Isao Hayashi | Osamu Kozugi | |
| 1976-02-21 | My Sex Report: Intensities わたしのSEX白書 絶頂度; Watashi no Sex-hakusho | Chūsei Sone | Maria Mitsui; Morihira Murakuni; Nobutaka Masutomi | Well-made sex melodrama about a voyeuristic female laboratory technician who becomes a prostitute. |
| 1976-02-21 | Competition: Married Couples Secret Technique 夫婦秘戯くらべ; Fufu Higi Kurabe | Kazunari Takeda | Junko Miyashita | Comedy involving impotence and voyeurism. |
| 1976-03-06 | Female Teacher: Cherry Boy Hunt 女教師 童貞狩り; Onna Kyoshi: Dotei-gari | Akira Katō | Tokuko Watanabe; Tsuyoshi Mikami; Shunsuke Nango | Sequel to Female Teacher: Boy Hunt (1975) |
| 1976-03-06 | Apartment Wife: Flesh Financing 団地妻 肉体金融; Danchizuma Nikutai Kinyu | Shōgorō Nishimura | Yu Mizuki; Jun Kosugi | 15th in the Apartment Wife series Considered the best of the later Apartment Wife films |
| 1976-03-13 | 新どぶ川学級; Shin dobugawa gakkyū | Koji Okamoto | Mitsuko Oka | |
| 1976-03-19 | Wet Vase aka Wet Tattooed Vagina 濡れた壺; Nureta Tsubo | Masaru Konuma | Naomi Tani; Hirokazu Inoue; Hiroko Fuji | A critically praised "psychological SM movie." |
| 1976-03-19 | 禁断 制服の悶え; Kindan: seifuku no modae | Isao Hayashi | Terumi Azuma | |
| 1976-04-03 | Fully Opened: Sisters Exposed aka Two Sisters: Strippers 全開 特出し姉妹; Zenkai Tokudashi Shimai | Yukihiko Kondo | Yūko Katagiri; Akimi Nijo; Osamu Tsuruoka | Another successful Kondo/Katagiri pairing. Katagiri plays a good sister with two stripper sisters. |
| 1976-04-14 | Runa's Confession: "Men Crawling All Over Me" ルナの告白 私に群がった男たち; Runa no Kokuhaku: Watashi Ni Muragatta Otokotachi | Kōyū Ohara | Runa Takamura; Rumi Tama | Story of Runa Takamura, member of the Golden Halves pop music group and star of Cloistered Nun: Runa's Confession (1976) |
| 1976-04-14 | 淫乱な関係; Inranna kankei | Nobuaki Shirai | Hitomi Kozue | |
| 1976-05-01 | Secret Wish ひめごころ; Himegokoro | Katsuhiko Fujii | Takako Kitagawa; Mami Yuki; Akira Nakabayashi | Story of a high school girl yearning to have her first sexual encounter. |
| 1976-05-01 | Cage of Lust: Wives' Afternoon 「妻たちの午後」より 官能の檻; Tsumatachi no Gogo Wa Yori: Kano no Ori | Shōgorō Nishimura | Junko Miyashita; Katsuro Yamada; Remika Hokuto | Another successful Junko Miyashita role as a lusty housewife. |
| 1976-05-15 | That Feeling あの感じ; Ano kanji | Isao Hayashi | 三上剛 | |
| 1976-05-15 | Lewd Widow 淫絶未亡人; Inzesu Mibojin | Chūsei Sone | Rumi Tama; Yuri Yamashina; Hideaki Ezumi | A minor effort from director Sone about the multiple affairs of a widow who runs a photo shop. |
| 1976-05-29 | I Am 18 Years Old: Secret Story of a Mistress 私は18才 (秘)二号生活; Watashi Wa 18-sai: Maruhi Nigo Seikatsu | Akihiko Yatsumaki | Mami Yuki; Tatsuya Hamaguchi | Story of a sailor who has an affair with a teenager mistakenly thinking she's a prostitute. |
| 1976-05-29 | 好色演戯 濡れ濡れ; Kōshoku engi: nurenure | Nobuaki Shirai | Natsuko Yashiro | |
| 1976-06-12 | Watcher in the Attic 江戸川乱歩猟奇館 屋根裏の散歩者; Edogawa Rampo Ryoki-Kan: Yaneura no Sanpo Sha | Noboru Tanaka | Junko Miyashita; Renji Ishibashi; Tokuko Watanabe | Sexual thriller based on an Edogawa Rampo story. A highly praised film which gained director Tanaka mainstream recognition. |
| 1976-06-12 | Slave Wife 奴隷妻; Dorei zuma | Akira Katō | Naomi Tani | In the post-World War II era, a chauffeur kidnaps the wife of his wealthy employer, and subjects her to sexual torture. |
| 1976-06-26 | Exposure: Call Girl's Testimony あるコールガールの証言 露出; Aru Callgirl no Shogen: Roshutsu | Shōgorō Nishimura | Kumi Taguchi; Tony Wada; Shinzo Hotta | Nishimura's last major film until the early 1980s. Taguchi plays a mixed-race callgirl with high-class clientele. |
| 1976-07-07 | Late Bloom: Campus Erotica キャンパス・エロチカ 熟れて開く; Campus Erotica: Urete Hiraku | Kazunari Takeda | Takako Kitagawa; Tokuko Watanabe; Hiroshi Yamamura | An unsuccessful comedy, notable for featuring Nikkatsu's first homosexual character. |
| 1976-07-07 | Assault! Jack the Ripper 暴行切り裂きジャック; Bōkō Kirisaki Jakku | Yasuharu Hasebe | Tamaki Katsura; Yutaka Hayashi; Yuri Yamashina | Controversial, but highly -praised "Violent pink" film. Katsura was nominated for the Japanese Academy's Best Actress award for this, her first starring role. |
| 1976-07-21 | Female Convict 101: Sexual Hell 女囚101 性感地獄 | Isao Hayashi | Rumi Tama | |
| 1976-07-21 | One Summer Experience: Sexy Virgin 性処女 ひと夏の経験; Seishojo: Hitonatsu no Keiken | Koretsugu Kurahara | Terumi Azuma; Eiko Horii; Katsuhisa Shinoda | A surrealistic thriller in the pink film genre. |
| 1976-07-31 | Getting Raped aka Raped 犯される; Okasareru | Masaru Konuma | Junko Miyashita; Maki Mizuno; Akira Hanagami | A minor film by director Konuma. |
| 1976-07-31 | Lusty Ama: Stirred-Up Pot 色情海女 乱れ壺; Shikijō ama: midare tsubo | Saburo Endō | Natsuko Yashiro | |
| 1976-08-11 | Midsummer Night's Affair: Bliss 真夏の夜の情事 悶え; Manatsu no Yo no Joji: Modae | Shōgorō Nishimura | Yūko Katagiri; Haruka Tajima; Hideaki Ezumi | A wife works two jobs to support her husband, who is cheating on her. |
| 1976-08-11 | I Am Aroused 感じるんです; Kanjirundesu | Shinichi Shiratori | Jun Izumi; Yu Mizuki; Katsuhisa Shinoda | Jun Izumi's debut film. |
| 1976-08-21 | 四畳半青春硝子張り; Yojohan garasubari | Akira Katō | 原真也 | |
| 1976-08-21 | 嗚呼！！花の応援団; Ah!! Hana no Oh-endan | Chūsei Sone | Junko Miyashita | |
| 1976-09-08 | Tokyo Secret Night Report aka Secret Night Report: Warm Sap 東京(秘)ナイト・レポート 熱い樹液; Tokyo Maruhi Night Report: Atsui Jueki | Kōyū Ohara | Kazuhiko Yakata; Akemi Nijo; Rie Tachibana | Story of a host at a nightclub who, against policy, falls in love with a client. First Roman porno to focus on a male leading character's sexuality. |
| 1976-09-25 | International Stewardess: Erotic Flight 国際線スチュワーデス 官能飛行; Kokusai-sen Stewardress: Kanno Hiko | Katsuhiko Fujii | Kumi Taguchi; Yuri Yamashina; Masayuki Yamamoto | Erotic thriller. Script by cult director Atsushi Yamatoya. |
| 1976-09-25 | Tattooed Flower Vase 花芯の刺青 熟れた壺; Kashin no irezumi: ureta tsubo | Masaru Konuma | Naomi Tani | A drama involving Oedipal themes and genital-tattooing. |
| 1976-10-09 | トルコ最新テクニック 吸舌; Toruko saishin tekunikku: kyuzetsu | Isao Hayashi | サロメ角田 | |
| 1976-10-09 | Apartment Wife: Secret Call Girl 団地妻 (秘)出張売春 - Danchizuma Maruhi Shuccho Baishun | Nobuaki Shirai | Erina Miyai; Remika Hokuto | 16th in the Apartment Wife series |
| 1976-10-20 | Assault! 暴行！ Boko! | Yukihiro Sawada | Hitomi Kozue; Erina Miyai; Nobutaka Masutomi | A critically praised S&M revenge drama. |
| 1976-10-20 | 東京秘密ホテル けものの戯れ; Tōkyō himitsu hoteru: kemono no tawamure | Atsushi Fujiura | Junko Miyashita | |
| 1976-10-20 | セミドキュメント 悶絶キャバレー; Semi dokyumento: monzetsu kyabaree | Tadashi Yoyogi | Timmy Sugimoto; Ayako Hoshi | |
| 1976-11-03 | 女高生(性)白書 肉体収容所; Jokōsei marusei hakusho | Akihiko Yatsumaki | Natsuko Yashiro | |
| 1976-11-03 | 幼な妻 絶叫！！ Osanazuma: zekkyō | Shinichi Shiratori | Rina Nagisa | |
| 1976-11-03 | 四年三組のはた; Yonen sangumi no hata | Katsuhiko Fujii | Ryōko Tateishi | |
| 1976-11-17 | Confessions of a Female Secretary: Juice From the Fruit 女秘書の告白 果肉のしたたり; Onna Hisho no Kokuhaku: Kaniku no Shitatari | Yukihiko Kondo | Hitomi Kozue; Erina Miyai; Kei Sasao | Melodrama about an office woman who is promoted as compensation for being raped by a company manager. |
| 1976-11-17 | 絶頂の女; Zecchō no onna | Saburo Endō | Yuri Yamashina | |
| 1976-11-27 | Student Mistress: Taste of a Virgin 学生情婦 処女の味; Gakusei Mabu: Shojo no Aji | Kōyū Ohara | Natsuko Yashiro; Seiji Endo; Junko Miyashita | A yakuza sex-drama. |
| 1976-11-27 | Lusty Wife: Temptation of Flesh 色情妻 肉の誘惑; Shikijo-zuma: Niku no Yuwaku | Shōgorō Nishimura | Teruho Matsunaga; Nagatoshi Sakamoto; Hidetoshi Kageyaroa | Blackmail involving the sexually frustrated wife of a city prosecutor. |
| 1976-12-08 | Lady Moonflower 夕顔夫人; Yūgao Fujin | Katsuhiko Fujii | Naomi Tani; Erina Miyai; Osamu Tsuruoka | An S&M melodrama about a blackmail plot involving the kidnapping and sexual abuse of the head of a flower-arranging school. |
| 1976-12-25 | サチコの幸; Sachiko no sachi | Kazunari Takeda | Miura Rika | |
| 1976-12-25 | 嗚呼！！花の応援団 役者やのォー; Ah!! Hana no Oh-endan yakusha yanoo | Chūsei Sone | Junko Miyashita | |

== 1977 ==
| Release date | Title | Director | Cast | Notes |
|---|---|---|---|---|
1977
| 1977-01-22 | Tissue Paper By the Geisha's Pillow 四畳半芸者の枕紙; Yojo-han Geisha no Makuragami | Shōgorō Nishimura | Junko Miyashita; Yukitomo Karano; Aoi Nakajima | |
| 1977-01-22 | Rape! 13th Hour レイプ25時 暴姦; Rape! 25-ji Bokan | Yasuharu Hasebe | Yuri Yamashina; Yudai Ishiyama; Akira Takahashi | Most extreme of the "Violent Pink" films. Financially successful, though critical disapproval caused Nikkatsu to temporarily end the genre after this. Violent Pink returned with Zoom Up: Rape Site (1979). |
| 1977-02-01 | Lusty Afternoon 肉欲の昼下り; Nikuyoku no Hirusagari | Akira Katō | Rumi Tama; Yu Mizuki; Hiroshi Gojo | Sex drama about a man who steals some money, then leaves his wife to live with a stripper. |
| 1977-02-01 | Painful Bliss! Final Twist aka Erotic Ecstasy: Sexual Sensations aka The Peculiar Triangle 悶絶!! どんでん返し; Monzetsu: Donden Gaeshi | Tatsumi Kumashiro | Naomi Tani; Osamu Tsuruoka; Seiji Endo | The script was the winning entry in a screenwriting contest by Nikkatsu. |
| 1977-02-12 | おんな（秘）発情度; Onna maruhi hatsujoki | Isao Hayashi | Yūko Katagiri | |
| 1977-02-22 | Erotic Diary of An Office Lady; OL官能日記 あｧ！私の中で; OL Kanno Nikki: Ah! Watashi no Naka De | Masaru Konuma | Asami Ogawa; Morihira Murakuni; Katsuo Yamada | 7th & last in the Office Lady Journal series Asami Ogawa's debut |
| 1977-02-23 | Beauty's Exotic Dance - Torture! 発禁本「美人乱舞」より 責める！ Hakkinbon Bijin Ranbu Yori: Semeru! | Noboru Tanaka | Junko Miyashita; Hatsuo Yamaya; Maya Kudo | |
| 1977-02-23 | 女高生トリオ 性感試験; Jokōsei torio: seikanshiken | Nobuaki Shirai | Kei Ogawa | |
| 1977-03-05 | Koichiro Uno's Yummy and Meaty 宇能鴻一郎のむちむちぷりん; Uno Koichiro no Muchimuchi Purin | Shinichi Shiratori | Yūko Katagiri; Nobuji Takeuchi | 2nd in the Koichiro Uno series. |
| 1977-03-05 | Rape Frenzy: Five Minutes Before Graduation 卒業五分前 群姦リンチ; Sotsugyo 5-fun Mae: Gunkan Lynch | Yukihiro Sawada | Katsuhiro Fukuda; Asami Ogawa; Toshiko Suemune | A youth-centered action pink film. |
| 1977-03-19 | 野球狂の詩; Yakyū-kyō no Uta | Akira Katō | Midori Kinouchi | |
| 1977-03-19 | 嗚呼！！花の応援団 男涙の親衛隊; Ah!! Hana no Oh-endan: Otoko Namida no Shineitai | Chūsei Sone | Susumu Honma | |
| 1977-04-09 | The Red Petal Is Wet 赤い花弁が濡れる; Akai Kaben Ga Nureru | Shōgorō Nishimura | Teruho Matsunaga; Hitomi Kozue; Nagatoshi Sakamoto | A melodrama about the relationship of a stripper and a drug addict. |
| 1977-04-09 | （秘）温泉 岩風呂の情事; Maruhi onsen: iwaburo jōji | Isao Hayashi | Naomi Tani | |
| 1977-04-23 | In the Realm of Sex 性と愛のコリーダ; Seito Ai no Koriida | Masaru Konuma | Asami Ogawa; Natsuko Yashiro; Naomi Tani | Parody of the Office Lady series. |
| 1977-04-23 | Dannoura Pillow War 壇の浦夜枕合戦記; Dannoura Yomakura Kassenki | Tatsumi Kumashiro | Tokuko Watanabe; Mono Kazama; Junko Miyashita | Film of a controversial, long-banned novel, set in historical events of the 14th century. |
| 1977-05-21 | Girl's Pleasure: Man Hunting 横須賀男狩り 少女・悦楽; Yokosuka Otoko-gari: Shoujo Kairaku | Toshiya Fujita | Kaori Ono; Jun Nakagawa; Akira Takahashi | An S&M story in which a man is the victim of sadistic revenge by women. |
| 1977-05-21 | Wet and Crying: Based On Aiko Nakayama's School of Widows 中山あい子「未亡人学校」より 濡れて泣; Nakayama Aiko "Mibojin Gakko" Yori: Nurete Naku | Katsuhiko Fujii | Junko Miyashita; Moeko Ezawa; Rei Okamoto | A dark story about a sexually frustrated widow. |
| 1977-06-04 | Rape Me: Sexual Assault In a Hotel Room ホテル強制わいせつ事件 犯して！ Hotel Kyosei Waisetsu Jiken: Okashite! | Koretsugu Kurahara | Erina Miyai; Yuri Yamashina; Tatsuya Hamaguchi | |
| 1977-06-04 | Fairy in a Cage 檻の中の妖精; Ori no naka no yōsei | Kōyū Ohara | Naomi Tani; Hirokazu Inoue; Rei Okamoto | An S&M film set during World War II, in which a high-class woman is tortured by the head of the military police. Considered one of the best of the genre. |
| 1977-06-25 | むれむれ女子大生; Muremure joshidaisei | Isao Hayashi | Asami Morikawa | |
| 1977-06-25 | Showtime 「市井」より 本番; Honban | Shōgorō Nishimura | Miyako Yamaguchi; Junko Miyashita; Yukiko Tachibana | Miyako Yamaguchi's debut film. A story of strippers, loosely based on the broadway A Chorus Line. |
| 1977-07-09 | Pink Salon: "We're Waiting For You With Tissue Paper" おさわりサロン おしぼりでお待ちします; Osawari Salon: Oshibori De Omachishimasu | Nobuaki Shirai | Yu Mizuki; Yoshinari Sumimoto; Haruka Shima | Well-reviewed story of a woman working at a massage parlor to earn money for her daughter. Filmed on location. |
| 1977-07-09 | Female Delinquent: A Docu-Drama 実録不良少女 姦 Jitsuroku Furyo Shoujo: Kan | Toshiya Fujita | Tayori Hinatsu; Yuya Uchida; Ittoku Kishibe | Controversial true story based on the autobiography of female delinquent, Mako Minato. |
| 1977-07-23 | Apartment Wife: Rainy Day Affair 団地妻 雨やどりの情事 - Danchizuma Amayadori no Joji | Shōgorō Nishimura | Junko Miyashita; Yu Mizuki | 17th in the Apartment Wife series Junko Miyashita's high-profile return to the series |
| 1977-07-23 | Nasty Diver 夜這い海女; Yobai Ama | Atsushi Fujiura | Aoi Nakajima; Naomi Oka | Beach fun and naked women underwater. Inspired by the popularity of Female Diver's Secret Report: Ecstasy (1975). Followed by Nasty Diver 2: Lusty Diver: T-Back Festival (1981) |
| 1977-08-06 | Koichiro Uno's Up and Down 宇能鴻一郎の上と下; Uno Koichiro no Ue to Shita | Shinichi Shiratori | Yūko Katagiri; Jun Nakagawa | 3rd in the Koichiro Uno series. |
| 1977-08-06 | Female Convict 101: Suck 女囚101 しゃぶる; Joshū 101: Shaburu | Kōyū Ohara | Naomi Tani; Tokuko Watanabe; Michio Murakami | |
| 1977-08-20 | Lady Chatterley In Tokyo 東京チャタレー夫人; Tokyo Chatterly Fujin | Katsuhiko Fujii | Izumi Shima; Hiromitsu Maya; Kenji Shiitani | Loosely based on the D. H. Lawrence novel. Not popular with the regular Roman Porno audience, but popular with female audiences. |
| 1977-08-20 | 夢野久作の少女地獄; Yumeno kyūsaku no shōjo jigoku | Masaru Konuma | Asami Ogawa | |
| 1977-08-25 | 先生のつうしんぼ; Sensei no tsūshinbo | Kazunari Takeda | Atsushi Watanabe | |
| 1977-09-03 | Being Assaulted 襲られる; Yarareru | Akira Katō | Erina Miyai; Hiroshi Gojo; Seiji Endo | A woman on her honeymoon encounters the man who had raped her as a young girl, and takes revenge. |
| 1977-09-03 | College Girl: One Summer Experience 女子大生 ひと夏の経験; Joshidaisei: Hitonatsu no Taiken | Yukihiko Kondo | Natsuko Yashiro; Rei Okamoto; Jun Aki | A dark, youth-oriented story of a college student having an affair with an older woman and a college classmate. |
| 1977-09-17 | 若妻日記 悶える; Wakazuma nikki: modaeru | Isao Hayashi | Yoko Azusa | |
| 1977-09-17 | 新宿乱れ街 いくまで待って; Shinjuku Midaregai: Ikumade Matte | Chūsei Sone | Miyako Yamaguchi | |
| 1977-10-01 | Erotic Campus: Rape Reception エロス学園 感度ばつぐん; Eros Gakuen: Kando Batsugun | Koretsugu Kurahara | Asami Ogawa; Asami Morikawa; Mami Yuki | Story of a popular high-school girl who is attracted to a juvenile delinquent. |
| 1977-10-01 | Fascination: Portrait of a Lady 幻想夫人絵図; Gensō fujin ezu | Kōyū Ohara | Naomi Tani; Yuko Asuka; Minoru Ohkochi | Director Ohara brings his pop-art-influenced style to his first true S&M film. Based on an Oniroku Dan story. |
| 1977-10-15 | Secret Honeymoon: Rape Train （秘）ハネムーン 暴行列車; Maruhi Honeymoon: Boko Ressha | Yasuharu Hasebe | Toshi Kato; Noriaki Abe; Natsuko Yashiro | Despite the title, an attempt by director Hasebe to make a film emphasizing romance after his previous, extreme Rape! 13th Hour (1977). |
| 1977-10-15 | 昼下りの情事 すすり泣き; Hirusagari no joji: susurinaki | Shinichi Shiratori | Junko Miyashita | |
| 1977-10-29 | Female Teacher 女教師; Onna Kyoshi | Noboru Tanaka | Eiko Nagashima; Yasuo Furoya | First in the controversial eight-film Female Teacher series, based on Female Teacher: Private Life and Female Teacher: Sweet Life (both 1973) |
| 1977-10-29 | Devil In the Flesh 肉体の悪魔; Nikutai no Akuma | Shōgorō Nishimura | Yuki Nohira; Yukio Ito; Yu Mizuki | Loosely based on Raymond Radiguet's novel, Le Diable Au Corps. |
| 1977-11-26 | 女子大生（秘）SEX診断; Joshidaisei maruhi sex shindan | Katsuhiko Fujii | Kei Ogawa | |
| 1977-11-26 | Apartment Wife: Violated Skin 団地妻 犯された肌 - Danchizuma Okasareta Hada | Nobuaki Shirai | Erina Miyai; Hideaki Ezumi | 18th in the Apartment Wife series |
| 1977-12-10 | Noble Lady: Bound Vase 団鬼六「黒い鬼火」より 貴婦人縛り壺; Dan Oniroku "Kuroi onibi" yori: kifujin shibari tsubo | Masaru Konuma | Naomi Tani | |
| 1977-12-24 | Sixteen Years Old: Nymphets' Room; 16歳・妖精の部屋; 16-sai: Yosei no Heya | Akira Katō | Shiori Hayase; Ryohei Uchida; Erina Miyai | A coming of age film about a girl from a village visiting her divorced mother in Tokyo. |
| 1977-12-24 | Gate of Flesh 肉体の門; Nikutai no Mon | Shōgorō Nishimura | Reiko Kayama; Tokuko Watanabe; Miyako Yamaguchi | Fourth filming of the popular Taijiro Tamura novel. Suffers in comparison with Seijun Suzuki's Gate of Flesh (1964). |

== 1978 ==
| Release date | Title | Director | Cast | Notes |
|---|---|---|---|---|
1978
| 1978-01-07 | 宇能鴻一郎のあげちゃいたいの; Uno Kōichirō no agechaitaino | Isao Hayashi | Natsuko Yashiro | 4th in the Kōichirō Uno series. |
| 1978-01-07 | Sins of Sister Lucia aka Sister Lucia's Dishonor 修道女ルシア 辱＜けが＞す; Shudojo Lucia: Kegasu | Kōyū Ohara | Yuki Nohira; Rumi Tama; Tamaki Katsura | A pop-art influenced nunsploitation film involving lesbianism and torture in a convent. |
| 1978-01-21 | Tenement Apartment: Obscene Affair 四畳半・猥褻な情事; Yo-jo-han: Wasenna Joji | Katsuhiko Fujii | Izumi Shima; Junko Miyashita; Tatsuya Hamaguchi | A sexually frustrated housewife participates in a swingers club. Unrelated to the Housewife's Experience trilogy (1975–1976). |
| 1978-01-21 | I Want to be Raped 私は犯されたい | Shinichi Shiratori | 幸早苗 | A complex story involving multiple rapes and gang-bangs. |
| 1978-02-04 | Sex Horoscope: Love Tasting 性愛占星術 SEX味くらべ; Seiai Senseijutsu: Sex Ajikurabe | Chūsei Sone | Junichiro Yamashita; Kenji Shiitani; Nobutaka Masutomi | A light comedy about three pink film makers searching for an undiscovered starlet at a hot springs resort. |
| 1978-02-04 | Attacked 襲う！！ Osou! | Yasuharu Hasebe | Asami Ogawa; Yoko Azusa; Hide Shirai | A police woman is raped, searches for the rapist, and is raped again. A film alternately praised and condemned for its ending, which does not reveal the identity of the rapist. |
| 1978-02-18 | Call Girl: Lust Cage ザ・コールガール 情痴の檻; The Call Girl: Jochi no Ori | Isao Hayashi | Teruho Matsunaga; Yoko Azusa; Asami Morikawa | Melodrama involving a married, sexually frustrated ex-prostitute having an affair with an old customer. |
| 1978-02-18 | 20歳の性白書 のけぞる | Koretsugu Kurahara | Erina Miyai | |
| 1978-03-04 | Wandering Lovers: Dizziness さすらいの恋人 眩暈 めまい; Sasurai no Koibito: Memai | Masaru Konuma | Toshiyuki Kitami; Kei Ogawa; Akira Takahashi | An unsuccessful film from director Konuma about a couple making a living through live sex shows. |
| 1978-03-04 | Junko's Bliss 順子わななく; Junko Wananaku | Kazunari Takeda | Junko Miyashita; Taiji Tonoyama; Moeko Ezawa | A story focusing on the sex life of a single woman living in an apartment. |
| 1978-03-18 | Dangerous Liaisons 危険な関係; Kiken na kankei | Toshiya Fujita | Masayo Utsunomiya | |
| 1978-03-18 | Teacher Deer 教師 女鹿; Kyoshi Mejika | Chūsei Sone | Hitomi Sakae; Kunio Ohtsuka; Hitoshi Takagi | An S&M story about a female high school teacher out to avenge her father. |
| 1978-04-01 | Lady Black Rose 黒薔薇夫人; Kurobara fujin | Shōgorō Nishimura | Naomi Tani; Haruka Tajima; Keijiro Shiga | Director Nishimura's first S&M film, featuring two notorious scenes which are often chosen as representative of the genre. |
| 1978-04-01 | 出張トルコ また行きます; Shucchō toruko mataikimasu | Atsushi Fujiura | Natsuko Yashiro | |
| 1978-04-15 | Attack! 襲え！ Osoe! | Yukihiro Sawada | Erina Miyai; Makoto Fuji; Norifumi Hori | |
| 1978-04-15 | Apartment Wife: Night By Ourselves 団地妻 二人だけの夜 - Danchizuma Futari Dake no Yoru | Isao Hayashi | Rumi Tama; Izumi Shima | 19th in the Apartment Wife series |
| 1978-04-29 | Friday Bedroom 金曜日の寝室; Kinyo-bi no Shinshitsu | Masaru Konuma | Reiko Kayama; Yuki Nohira; Hiroshi Unayama | |
| 1978-04-29 | Pink Tush Girl 桃尻娘 ピンク・ヒップ・ガール; Momojiri Musume: Pink Hip Girl | Kōyū Ohara | Kahori Takeda; Ako; Jun Takahashi | First film in Ohara's Pink Tush Girl trilogy, popular with both male and female audiences. |
| 1978-05-20 | （秘）肉体調教師; Maruhi nikutai chokyōshi | Nobuaki Shirai | Rina Nagisa | |
| 1978-05-20 | 果てしなき絶頂; Hateshinaki zecchō | Akira Katō | Kyoko Aoyama | |
| 1978-06-03 | From Orion's Testimony: Formula For Murder オリオンの殺意より 情事の方程式; Orion no Satsui Yori: Jouji no Houteishiki | Kichitaro Negishi | Shogo Kano; Miyako Yamaguchi; Mutsuhiro Toura | |
| 1978-06-03 | 若妻が濡れるとき; Wakazuma ga nureru toki | Katsuhiko Fujii | Izumi Shima | |
| 1978-06-24 | Extracurricular Activities: Almost Ripe 課外授業 熟れはじめ; Kagaikyoju: Urehajime | Shinichi Shiratori | Machiko Ohtani; Katsidiisa Shinoda; Haruka Tajima | |
| 1978-06-24 | Rope Hell 縄地獄; Nawa jigoku | Kōyū Ohara | Naomi Tani; Nami Aoki; Hirokazu Inoue | Another S&M story starring Naomi Tani. Tani plays a female yakuza who is kidnapped and tortured by a rival gang and comes to enjoy it. |
| 1978-07-08 | Erotic Liaisons エロチックな関係; Erotic na kankei | Yasuharu Hasebe | Yuya Uchida; Reiko Kayama; Hitomi Maki | |
| 1978-07-08 | Rape and Death of a Housewife 人妻集団暴行致死事件; Hitozuma Shudan Boko Chishi Jiken | Noboru Tanaka | Hideo Murota; Noriko Kurosawa; Akira Sakai | |
| 1978-07-22 | 淫絶海女 うずく; Inzetsu ama uzuku | Isao Hayashi | Natsuko Yashiro | |
| 1978-07-22 | Angel Guts: High School Coed 女高生 天使のはらわた; Jokousei Tenshi no Harawata | Chūsei Sone | Machiko Ohtani; Sansho Fukami; Megu Kawashima | First in the nine-film Angel Guts series, based on a manga by Takashi Ishii. |
| 1978-08-05 | ひと夏の関係; Hito natsu no kankei | Akira Katō | Minako Mizushima | |
| 1978-08-05 | 宇能鴻一郎の看護婦寮; Uno Kōichiro no kangofuryo | Shōgorō Nishimura | Etsuko Hara | 5th in the Kōichirō Uno series. |
| 1978-09-09 | Young Beast: Secret Pleasures 青い獣 ひそかな愉しみ; Aoi Kemono: Hisokana tanoshimi | Kazunari Takeda | Shogo Kano; Noboru Mitani; Minako Mizushima | |
| 1978-09-09 | Skin of Roses 団鬼六 薔薇の肉体; Dan Oniroku Bara no Nikutai | Katsuhiko Fujii | Naomi Tani; Yoshio Hidaka; Ako | |
| 1978-09-23 | Sometimes... Like a Prostitute 時には娼婦のように; Toki Niwa Shofu no Yoni | Masaru Konuma | Rei Nakanishi; Eri Kanuma; Erina Miyai | |
| 1978-09-23 | Bone of a Butterfly: Hunter With White Skin 白い肌の狩人 蝶の骨; Shiroi Hada no Karyudo: Cho no Hone | Shōgorō Nishimura | Yuki Nobira; Miyako Yamaguchi; Jun Nakahara | |
| 1978-10-07 | Female Prison おんな刑務所; Onna Keimusho | Nobuaki Shirai | Erina Miyai; Natsuko Yashiro; Toru Ibuki | |
| 1978-10-07 | High School Emanuelle: Wet Saturday 高校エマニエル 濡れた土曜日; Koko Emanuelle: Nureta Doyobi | Nobuyuki Saito | Minako Mizushima; Machiko Ohtani; Yuko Asuka | Director Nobuyuki Saito's debut film. |
| 1978-10-21 | 女教師 秘密; Jokyōshi himitsu | Shinichi Shiratori | Miyako Yamaguchi | |
| 1978-10-21 | 泉大八の犯しっこ; Izumi daihachi no okashikko | Katsuhiko Fujii | Izumi Shima; Yūko Katagiri | |
| 1978-11-03 | ハワイアンラブ 危険なハネムーン; Hawaian rabu: kikenna hanemuun | Isao Hayashi | Reiko Kayama | |
| 1978-11-03 | Pink Salon: Five Lewd Women ピンクサロン 好色五人女; Pink Salon: Koshoku Gonin Onna | Noboru Tanaka | Erina Miyai; Kyōko Aoyama (Aizome); Miyako Yamaguchi | |
| 1978-11-18 | Bathhouse 911: Jellyfish Bliss トルコ110番 悶絶くらげ; Toruko 110-ban: Monzetsu Kurage | Yukihiko Kondo | Etsuko Hara; Koichi Hoshino; Yūko Katagiri | |
| 1978-11-18 | Raping! 暴る！ Yaru! | Yasuharu Hasebe | Natsuko Yashiro; Kenji Shiitani; Kyōko Aizome | |
| 1978-12-02 | Rope Cosmetology 団鬼六 縄化粧; Dan Oniroku nawagesho | Shōgorō Nishimura | Naomi Tani; Aoi Nakajima; Katsu Yamada | |
| 1978-12-23 | Woman's Bedroom: Lusty Competition おんなの寝室 好きくらべ; Onna no shinshitsu: sukikurabe | Shinichi Shiratori | Junko Miyashita; Naomi Tani; Etsuko Hara | |
| 1978-12-23 | Invisible Man: Rape! 透明人間 犯せ！ Tomei Ningen: Okase! | Isao Hayashi | Izumi Shima; Teru Satō; Erina Miyai; Maria Mari | |

== 1979 ==
| Release date | Title | Director | Cast | Notes |
|---|---|---|---|---|
1979
| 1979-01-06 | Koichiro Uno's Wet and Open 宇能鴻一郎の濡れて開く; Uno Koichiro no Nurete Hiraku | Shōgorō Nishimura | Natsuko Yashiro; Shinobu Takeuchi; Yukiko Tachibana | 6th in the Koichiro Uno series. |
| 1979-01-06 | Angel Guts: Red Classroom 天使のはらわた 赤い教室; Tenshi no Harawata Akai Kyoshitsu | Chūsei Sone | Yūki Mizuhara; Keizo Kanie; Jun Aki | 2nd film in the Angel Guts series. |
| 1979-01-20 | Wet Rope Confession: Convent Story 修道女 濡れ縄ざんげ; Shūdōjo: nure nawazange | Kōyū Ohara | Yuki Nohira | |
| 1979-01-20 | High School Girl 女生徒; Joseito | Kichitaro Negishi | Machiko Ohtani; Yoko Kurita; Yususuke Koike | |
| 1979-02-03 | Rape Climax: Skinning クライマックスレイプ 剥ぐ！ Climax Rape: Hagu | Katsuhiko Fujii | Minako Mizushima; Akira Sakai; Megu Kawashima | |
| 1979-02-03 | 好色美容師 肉体の報酬; Kōshoku biyōshi: nikutai no hōshū | Atsushi Fujiura | Toshiyuki Kitami; Asami Ogawa | |
| 1979-02-17 | 白いふくらみ; Shiroi fukurami | Nobuaki Shirai | Jun'ichiro Yamashita; Izumi Shima | |
| 1979-02-17 | The Woman with Red Hair 赫い髪の女; Akai Kami no Onna | Tatsumi Kumashiro | Junko Miyashita; Renji Ishibashi; Ako | Considered one of the best Roman Pornos, it was judged 4th best film of the year by Kinema Jumpo, and Junko Miyashita received the best actress award. |
| 1979-03-03 | Koichiro Uno's Nurses' Journal 宇能鴻一郎の看護婦寮日記; Uno Koichiro no Kangofu-ryo Nikki | Shinichi Shiratori | Minako Mizushima; Yūko Katagiri; Nagatoshi Sakamoto | 7th in the Koichiro Uno series. |
| 1979-03-03 | Female Teacher: Dirty Rumor 女教師 汚れた噂; Onna Kyoshi: Yogoreta Uwasa | Akira Katō | Erina Miyai; Yudo Yoshikawa | 2nd film in the Female Teacher series. |
| 1979-03-17 | Forbidden Ordeal 禁じられた体験; Kinjirareta Taiken | Shōgorō Nishimura | Akiko Hyuga; Junko Miyashita; Kiyoyasu Adachi | A softcore soap-opera involving incestuous longings and abortion. |
| 1979-03-17 | Flesh Target: Rape! 肉の標的 奪う！！ Niku no Hyoteki: Ubau | Yukihiro Sawada | Eri Kanuma; Izumi Shima | |
| 1979-03-31 | College Girls On Friday 泉大八の女子大生の金曜日; Izumi Daihachi no Joshidaisei no Kinyobi | Masaru Konuma | Minako Mizushima; Yumi Fukazawa; Megu Kawashima | |
| 1979-04-14 | Woman of the Afternoon: Incite! 昼下りの女 挑発！！ Hirusagari no Onna: Chohatsu!! | Nobuyuki Saito | Natsuko Yashiro; Yumi Fukazawa; Akiko Hyuga | Dark, torture-filled, ero guro-style film with comic touches. |
| 1979-04-14 | Yummy In Neon Town: "I Am Ready to Be Eaten" むちむちネオン街 私たべごろ; Muchimuchi Neon-gai: Watashi Tabegoro | Yoshihisa Nakagawa | Miyako Yamaguchi; Nami Misaki; Yutaka Hayashi | |
| 1979-04-28 | Pink Tush Girl: Love Attack 桃尻娘 ラブアタック; Momojiri Musume: Rabu Atakku | Kōyū Ohara | Kahori Takeda; Ako; Yoko Kurita | 2nd film in Ohara's Pink Tush Girl trilogy. |
| 1979-04-28 | So Soft, So Cunning もっとしなやかに もっとしたたかに; Motto Shinayaka Ni Motto Shitataka Ni | Toshiya Fujita | Aiko Morishita; Junko Takazawa; Eiji Okuda | Contains mainstream actress Aiko Morishita's first nude scenes. Originated the catch-phrase, kutabare nyu famiri "space age family". |
| 1979-05-19 | High School Erotopia: Red Uniforms 高校エロトピア 赤い制服; Koko Erotopia: Akai Seifuku | Shinichi Shiratori | Jun Takahashi; Kanji Kume; Hiroshi Fujino | |
| 1979-05-19 | 凌辱 こます; Ori komasu | Nobuaki Shirai | Erina Miyai | |
| 1979-06-02 | Marital War In Kibogaoka 希望ケ丘夫婦戦争; Kibogaoka Fufu Senso | Shōgorō Nishimura | Yūko Katagiri; Miyako Yamaguchi; Jun Hongo | |
| 1979-06-02 | Three Juicy Sisters: Casual Sex 色情三姉妹 ひざくずし; Shikijo Sanshimai: Hizakuzushi | Nobuaki Shirai | Izumi Shima; Akiko Hyuga; Yumi Fukazawa | |
| 1979-06-23 | Momoe's Lips: Rape Shot レイプショット 百恵の唇; Rape Shot: Momoe no Kuchibiru | Katsuhiko Fujii | Minako Mizushima; Yuko Asuka; Miyako Yamaguchi | |
| 1979-06-23 | Apartment Wife: Target Bedroom 団地妻 狙われた寝室 - Danchizuma Nerawareta Shinshitsu | Isao Hayashi | Erina Miyai; Megu Kawashima | 20th in the Apartment Wife series |
| 1979-07-07 | Angel Guts: Nami 天使のはらわた 名美; Tenshi no Harawata: Nami | Noboru Tanaka | Eri Kanuma; Takeo Chii; Minako Minushima | 3rd film in the Angel Guts series. |
| 1979-07-07 | White & Wet Summer 白く濡れた夏; Shiroku Nureta Natsu | Akira Katō | Shino Ikenami; Akio Hasegawa; Koji Nanjo | |
| 1979-07-21 | Rope and Skin 団鬼六 縄と肌; Dan Oniroku Nawa to Hada | Shōgorō Nishimura | Naomi Tani; Yuri Yamashina; Shōhei Yamamoto; Junko Miyashita | Naomi Tani's final film |
| 1979-07-21 | Clam-Diving Ama 潮吹き海女; Shiofuki ama | Shinichi Shiratori | Akiko Hyuga | |
| 1979-08-04 | Koichiro Uno's Female Gymnastic Teacher 宇能鴻一郎の女体育教師; Uno Koichiro no Onna Taiiku Kyoshi | Kōyū Ohara | Eri Kanuma; Erina Miyai | 8th in the Koichiro Uno series. |
| 1979-08-04 | Secret of One Summer ひと夏の秘密; Hitonatsu no Himitsu | Kazunari Takeda | Etsuko Hara; Tokuko Watanabe; Hideaki Ezumi | |
| 1979-08-18 | スーパーGUNレディ ワニ分署 | Chūsei Sone | Emii Yokoyama | |
| 1979-08-18 | 十八歳、海へ; 18sai umi e | Toshiya Fujita | Aiko Morishita | |
| 1979-09-08 | Zoom Up: Rape Site ズームアップ 暴行現場; Zoom Up: Boko Genba | Kōyū Ohara | Erina Miyai; Yuki Yoshizawa; Kenji Shimizu | First in the seven-film Zoom Up series. A return to the ultra-violent, misogynistic "Violent Pink" style which had been curtailed after Rape! 13th Hour (1977). |
| 1979-09-08 | 看護婦日記 いたずらな指; Kangofu nikki: itazurana yubi | Shinichi Shiratori | Asami Ogawa | |
| 1979-09-22 | レイプハリケーン 裂く！！ Reipu harikeen: saku!! | Nobuaki Shirai | Yukie Ishii 高橋麗美 | |
| 1979-09-22 | Wet Weekend 濡れた週末; Nureta Shumatsu | Kichitaro Negishi | Junko Miyashita; Aoi Nakajima; Ako | |
| 1979-10-06 | Mr Dilemma Man (Dilemman): Lunatic For Lust; Mr．ジレンマン 色情狂い; Mr Dilemman: Shikijo-gurui | Masaru Konuma | Akira Emoto; Yukiko Tachibana; Yuka Asagiri | |
| 1979-10-06 | Bridal Doll 団鬼六 花嫁人形; Dan Oniroku Hanayome Ningyo | Katsuhiko Fujii | Asako Kurayoshi; Izumi Shima; Hiroshi Unayama | |
| 1979-10-27 | Star of David: Beautiful Girl Hunter 堕靡泥の星 美少女狩り; Dabide no Hoshi: Bishoujoj-gari | Norifumi Suzuki | Natsuko Yashiro; Asami Ogawa; Bunta Sugawara | |
| 1979-10-27 | Tokyo Eros: 1001 Nights 東京エロス千夜一夜; Tokyo Eros Senya Ichiya | Shōgorō Nishimura | Izumi Shima; Erina Miyai; Hosei Komatsu | |
| 1979-11-10 | エロス学園 発情時代; Erosu gakuen: hatsujhojidai | Isao Hayashi | 田辺治郎; Eri Kanuma | |
| 1979-11-10 | Koichiro Uno's Moist and Steamy 宇能鴻一郎のあつく湿って; Uno Koichiro no Atsuku Shimette | Akira Katō | Minako Mizushima; Kiyonari Tayama; Hiroshi Ichimura | 9th in the Koichiro Uno series. |
| 1979-11-23 | ホールインラブ 草むらの欲情; Hōru in rabu: kusamura no yokujō | Isao Hayashi | Miyako Yamaguchi | |
| 1979-11-23 | Apartment Wife: Lust for an Orgasm 団地妻 肉欲の陶酔 - Danchizuma Nikuyoku no Tousui | Hidehiro Ito | Eri Kanuma; Masato Furoya | 21st and last film in the Apartment Wife series |
| 1979-12-08 | 快楽昇天風呂; Kairaku shōten buro | Atsushi Fujiura | 林ゆたか | |
| 1979-12-22 | Target of Lust 愛欲の標的; Aiyoku no Hyoteki | Noboru Tanaka | Erina Miyai; Minako Mizushima; Shin Nakamaru | |
| 1979-12-22 | Lady Momoko's Adventure 桃子夫人の冒険; Momoko Fujin no Boken | Kōyū Ohara | Akiko Hyuga; Aki Togo; Masahiro Yoshiwara | |

== 1980 ==
| Release date | Title | Director | Cast | Notes |
|---|---|---|---|---|
1980
| 1980-01-05 | Koichiro Uno's Wet and Purring 宇能鴻一郎の濡れて悶える; Uno Koichiro no Nurete Modaeru | Shōgorō Nishimura | Etsuko Hara; Maria Mari; Izumi Shima | 10th in the Koichiro Uno series. |
| 1980-01-05 | Red Violation 赤い暴行; Akai Boko | Chūsei Sone | Megumi Saki; Fujio Takahashi; Yuri Yamashina | A rock star has sex with a virginal fan, and an unexpected relationship develops. Considered one of the best pink films. |
| 1980-01-19 | 修道女 黒衣の中のうずき; Shūdōjo: kokui no naka no uzuki | Nobuaki Shirai | Eri Kanuma | |
| 1980-01-19 | 女高生 危険なめばえ; Jokōsei: kikenna mebae | Shinichi Shiratori | Akemi Morimura | |
| 1980-02-02 | Rape Hunter: Target Woman レイプハンター 狙われた女; Rape Hunter: Nerawareta Onna | Yukihiro Sawada | Hiromi Okamoto; Tokuko Watanabe; Mirai Kiuri | |
| 1980-02-02 | Showa Erotica: Noble Lady of Roses 昭和エロチカ 薔薇の貴婦人; Showa Erotica: Bara no Kifujin | Katsuhiko Fujii | Erina Miyai; Yuko Asuka; Junko Mabuki | |
| 1980-02-16 | 背徳夫人の欲望; Haitoku fujin no yokujō | Isao Hayashi | Izumi Shima | |
| 1980-02-16 | Rape Ceremony 暴行儀式; Boko gishiki | Kichitaro Negishi | Megumi Saki; Minako Mizushima; Yoshiharu Yamazaki | |
| 1980-03-01 | Image of a Bound Girl 団鬼六 少女縛り絵図; Dan Oniroku Shoujo Shibari Ezu | Masaru Konuma | Kumiko Hayano; Hide Ezumi; Yuko Asuka | |
| 1980-03-01 | Sukeban Mafia スケバンマフィア 肉刑 リンチ; Sukeban Mafia | Toshiharu Ikeda | Asako Kurayoshi; Yuko Ohsaki; Tokuko Watanabe | |
| 1980-03-15 | Zoom In: Rape Apartments ズームイン 暴行団地; Zoom In: Boko Danchi | Naosuke Kurosawa | Erina Miyai; Yuko Ohsaki; Keijiro Shiga | 2nd in the Zoom Up series. Sequel to Zoom Up: Rape Site (1979). |
| 1980-03-15 | Koichiro Uno's Hotel Maid Diary 宇能鴻一郎のホテルメイド日記; Uno Koichiro no Hotel Maid Nikki | Shinichi Shiratori | | 11th in the Koichiro Uno series. |
| 1980-03-29 | 少女娼婦 けものみち; Shōjo shōfu: kemono michi | Tatsumi Kumashiro | Ayako Yoshimura | |
| 1980-03-29 | 新入社員 (秘)OL大奥物語; Shin nyūshain maruhi ōeru ōoku monogatari | Nobuaki Shirai | Akiko Hyuga | |
| 1980-04-12 | Woman's Trail: Wet Path おんなの細道 濡れた海峡; Onna no Hosomichi: Nureta Kaikyo | Kazunari Takeda | Natsuko Kiriya; Miyako Yamaguchi; Kan Mikami | |
| 1980-04-12 | Confessions of a College Girl: Red Temptation 女子大生の告白 赤い誘惑者; Joshidaisei no Kokuhaku: Akai Yuwaku | Akira Katō | Ryoko Kinoyama; Tomoka Asagiri; Miyako Yamaguchi | |
| 1980-04-26 | Juvenile Wife おさな妻; Osana-zuma | Shinichi Shiratori | Etsuko Hara; Nami Misaki; Shingo Yamamoto | |
| 1980-04-26 | Pink Tush Girl: Proposal Strategy 桃尻娘 プロポーズ大作戦; Momojiri Musume: Puropozu Daisakusen | Kōyū Ohara | Kahori Takeda; Ako Jun Takahashi; Eiko Nagashima | Last film in Ohara's Pink Tush Girl trilogy. |
| 1980-05-17 | White Uniform In Rope Hell 団鬼六 白衣縄地獄; Dan Oniroku Hakui Nawa Jigoku | Shōgorō Nishimura | Junko Mabuki; Yutaka Hayashi; Yukiko Tachibana | |
| 1980-05-31 | Uptown Lady: Days of Eros 山の手夫人 性愛の日々; Yamanote Fujin: Seiai no Hibi | Masaru Konuma | Izumi Shima; Ryuichi Nagashima; Yoichiro Sanada | |
| 1980-05-31 | 女子大生 快楽あやめ寮; Joshidaisei: kairaku ayameryo | Katsuhiko Fujii | Eri Anzai | |
| 1980-06-21 | 若妻官能クラブ 絶頂遊戯; Wakazuma kannō kurabu: zecchō yūgi | Hidehiro Ito | Akiko Hyuga | |
| 1980-06-21 | "Never In the Morning!" 朝はダメよ！ Asa Wa Dameyo! | Kichitaro Negishi | Eri Kanuma; Kazuyo Ezaki; Yuko Ohsaki | |
| 1980-07-05 | 若後家海女 うずく; Wakagoke ama: uzuku | Atsushi Fujiura | Erina Miyai | |
| 1980-07-05 | High School Girl: Open Lips In Summer 女高生 夏ひらく唇; Jokōsei: Natsu Hiraku Kuchibiru | Akira Katō | Ayako Ōta; Nami Misaki; Hiroshi Fukami | |
| 1980-07-19 | Koichiro Uno's Shell Competition 宇能鴻一郎の貝くらべ; Uno Koichiro no Kaikurabe | Shinichi Shiratori | Erina Miyai; Mayumi Terashima | 12th in the Koichiro Uno series. |
| 1980-07-19 | Secret of Newlywed Wife 単身赴任 新妻の秘密; Tanshin Funin: Niizuma no Himitsu | Shōgorō Nishimura | Maiko Kazama; Izumi Shima | |
| 1980-08-02 | Nurses' Journal: Nasty File 看護婦日記 わいせつなカルテ; Kangofu Nikki: Waisetsu Na Karute | Shōgorō Nishimura | Etsuko Hara; Eri Kanuma | |
| 1980-08-02 | 赤い通り雨; Akai tori ame | Kōyū Ohara | Yuki Kazamatsuri | |
| 1980-08-16 | 元祖大四畳半大物語; Ganso daiyonjyohan daimonogatari | Chūsei Sone/Reiji Matsumoto | Hiroko Shino | |
| 1980-08-16 | 鉄騎兵、跳んだ; Tekkihei, tonda | Keiichi Ozawa | Miyuki Kumagai | |
| 1980-09-06 | Sukeban Mafia: Dirty Insult スケバンマフィア 恥辱; Sukeban Mafia: Chijoku | Nobuyuki Saito | Asako Kurayoshi; Yukiko Mizuki; Noriaki Abe | |
| 1980-09-06 | 愛の白昼夢; Ai no hakuchumu | Kōyū Ohara | Yoko Hatanaka | |
| 1980-09-20 | Woman Who Cries 泣く女; Naku Onna | Shōgorō Nishimura | Maiko Kazama; Asami Ogawa; Osamu Tsuruoka | First in the four-film The Woman Who... series, all starring Maiko Kazama. |
| 1980-09-20 | Blazing Bondage Lady aka Madam Rope Flame 団鬼六 縄炎夫人; Dan Oniroku Joen Fujin | Katsuhiko Fujii | Junko Mabuki; Izumi Shima; Tomoka Asagiri | |
| 1980-10-04 | Hard Scandal: Sex Drifter ハードスキャンダル 性の漂流者; Hard Scandal: Sei no Hyoryu-sha | Noboru Tanaka | Ako; Rie Kitahara; Yudo Yoshikawa | |
| 1980-10-04 | Koichiro Uno's Adultery Diary 宇能鴻一郎の浮気日記; Uno Koichiro no Uwaki Nikki | Nobuaki Shirai | Eri Kanuma; Akio Kaneda | 13th in the Koichiro Uno series. |
| 1980-10-22 | Sex Hunter セックスハンター 性狩人; Sex Hunter | Toshiharu Ikeda | Erina Miyai; Ayako Ōta; Nobuyuki Inoue | Controversial film based on an adult manga by Dirty Matsumoto. |
| 1980-10-22 | Wife's Sexual Fantasy: Before Husband's Eyes 妻たちの性体験 夫の眼の前で、今・・・ Tsumatachi no Seitaiken: Otto no Me no Maede Ima | Masaru Konuma | Yuki Kazamatsuri; Hiroshi Unayama; Rika Takahara | |
| 1980-11-07 | Climax! Raped Bride クライマックス 犯される花嫁; Climax! Okasareru Hanayome | Shinichi Shiratori | Etsuko Hara; Mayumi Terashima; Daiki Kato | |
| 1980-11-21 | Woman Who Arches Her Back のけぞる女; Nokezoru Onna | Akira Katō | Maiko Kazama; Yudo Yoshikawa; Yumi Hayakawa | 2nd in the 4-film The Woman Who... series. |
| 1980-11-21 | Pleasure Campus: Secret Games 快楽学園 禁じられた遊び; Kairaku Gakuen: Kinjirareta Asobi | Tatsumi Kumashiro | Ayako Ohta; Rie Kitahara; Junko Miyashita | |
| 1980-12-05 | Hell of Roses 団鬼六 薔薇地獄; Dan Oniroku Bara Jigoku | Shōgorō Nishimura | Junko Mabuki; Yuki Yoshizawa; Shu Wada | |
| 1980-12-05 | セックスドック 淫らな治療; Sekkusu Dokku: Midarana Chiryō | Atsushi Fujiura | Izumi Shima | |
| 1980-12-26 | From the Back Or From the Front 後から前から; Ushiro Kara Mae Kara | Kōyū Ohara | Yoko Hatanaka; Yuki Kazamatsuri; Masatsugu Takase | A female delinquent story starring pop singer Yoko Hatanaka. |
| 1980-12-26 | Momoe's Lips': Love Beast 百恵の唇 愛獣; Momoe no Kuchibiru: Aiju | Akira Katō | Akiko Hyuga; Jun Izumi; Megumi Murakawa | |

== 1981 ==
| Release date | Title | Director | Cast | Notes |
|---|---|---|---|---|
1981
| 1981-01-09 | Koichiro Uno's Girl Dormitory 宇能鴻一郎の修道院付属女子寮; Uno Koichiro no shudōin fuzoku joshiryō | Shōgorō Nishimura | | 14th in the Koichiro Uno series. |
| 1981-01-09 | Woman Who Exposes Herself 見せたがる女; Misetagaru onna | Masaru Konuma | Maiko Kazama; Izumi Shima | 3rd in the 4-film The Woman Who... series. |
| 1981-01-23 | Office Lady Rope Slave 団鬼六 OL縄奴隷; Dan Oniroku OL nawa dorei | Katsuhiko Fujii | Junko Mabuki; Masayoshi Nogami; Asami Ogawa | |
| 1981-01-23 | Female Teacher: Dirty After School 女教師 汚れた放課後; Onna kyoshi: yogoreta hōkago | Kichitaro Negishi | Yuki Kazamatsuri; Ayako Ohta | 3rd film in the Female Teacher series. |
| 1981-02-06 | 単身赴任 情事の秘密; Tanshin funin: jōji no himitsu | Nobuaki Shirai | Nami Misaki | |
| 1981-02-20 | Zoom Up: Woman From the Dirty Magazine ズームアップ ビニール本の女; Zoom up: biniirubon no onna | Takashi Sugano | Junko Mabuki; Kumiko Hayano | 3rd in the Zoom Up series. |
| 1981-02-20 | 欲情まんかい 若妻同窓会; Yokujō mankai: wakazuma dōsōkai | Shinichi Shiratori | Yuki Kazamatsuri | |
| 1981-03-06 | College Girl: The Spot 女子大生 ザ・穴場; Joshidaisei: the anaba | Yoshihiro Kawasaki | Mayumi Terashima; Eri Anzai; Yasuhiko Ishizu | |
| 1981-03-06 | Lady Caligula In Tokyo 東京カリギュラ夫人; Tōkyō Caligula fujin | Kōyū Ohara | Maiko Kazama; Asami Ogawa; Tsutomu Akashi | A housewife, tired of her husband's infidelity, embarks on sexual adventures of her own, leading to a climactic masked orgy. |
| 1981-04-03 | Love Beast: Flower of Vice 愛獣 悪の華; Aiju: aku no hana | Akira Katō | Jun Izumi; Miki Yamaji; Tsuyoshi Naito | |
| 1981-04-03 | Uniform Girls: The Fruit Is Ripe 制服体験トリオ わたし熟れごろ; Seifuku taiken torio: watashi uregoro | Shōgorō Nishimura | Mayumi Terashima; Ayako Ohta; Rie Kitahara | |
| 1981-04-24 | Crazy Fruit 狂った果実; Kurutta kajitsu | Kichitaro Negishi | Yuji Honma; Yuki Ninagawa; Eiko Nagashima | |
| 1981-04-24 | Essential Information For a College Girl 女子大生の基礎知識 ANO ANO; Joshidaisei no kiso chishiki: ano ano | Kōyū Ohara | Kumi Aochi; Yoko Morimura; Ayako Ōta | |
| 1981-05-15 | "Love Me Strong... Love Me Hard" もっと激しくもっとつよく; Motto hageshiku motto tsuyoku | Noboru Tanaka | Maki Kawamura; Izumi Shima; Maiko Kazama; Tatsuo Yamada | |
| 1981-05-15 | Female Teacher's Awakening 女教師のめざめ; Onna kyoshi no mezame | Katsuhiko Fujii | Junko Asahina; Yuri Yamashina; Mari Kishida | 4th film in the Female Teacher series. |
| 1981-05-29 | Uno Koichiro's Open and Close 宇能鴻一郎の開いて写して; Uno Koichiro no hiraite utsushite | Shōgorō Nishimura | Mayumi Terajima | 15th in the Koichiro Uno series. |
| 1981-05-29 | Secretary Rope Discipline 団鬼六 女秘書縄調教; Dan Oniroku onna hisho nawa chyokyo | Hidehiro Ito | Junko Mabuki; Jun Nakahara; Yumi Hayakawa | |
| 1981-06-12 | Woman Who Is Used あそばれる女; Asobareru onna | Masaru Konuma | Maiko Kazama; Asami Ogawa | 4th and last in the 4-film The Woman Who... series. |
| 1981-06-26 | Widow's Bedroom 未亡人の寝室; Mibojin no shinshitsu | Nobuyuki Saito | Izumi Shima; Nami Misaki; Hajime Tanimoto | |
| 1981-06-26 | Nasty Diver 2: Lusty Diver: T-Back Festival 色情海女 ふんどし祭り; Shikijo ama: fundoshi matsuri | Atsushi Fujiura | Yoko Mahamura; Yoshi Yokihara | Sequel to Nasty Diver (1977). Beach fun and nude women underwater combined with a Mardi-Gras-like festival. |
| 1981-07-10 | I Like It From Behind バックが大好き; Bakku ga daisuki | Kōyū Ohara | Junko Asahina; Yumi Hayakawa; Mari Kishida | |
| 1981-07-10 | Lustful Life: "Night Make Me Wet!" 愛欲生活 夜よ、濡らして; Aiyoku seikatsu: yoru yo nurashite | Shōgorō Nishimura | Yuki Kazamatsuri; Joji Nakata; Junko Mabuki | |
| 1981-07-24 | Blue Lagoon: A Summer Experience ひと夏の体験 青い珊瑚礁; Hitonatsu no taiken: aoi sangosho | Toshiharu Ikeda | Mayumi Terashima; Yuka Asagiri; Mitsuo Namihira | A light romance. Director Ikeda claims he was forced to do this film as a punishment for his controversial Sex Hunter (1980). Filmed in Okinawa. |
| 1981-07-24 | Love Beast: Attack! 愛獣 襲る！ Aiju: yaru! | Naosuke Kurosawa | Jun Izumi; Rui Nonomura; Rumi Tama | |
| 1981-08-07 | Do It Again Like An Animal モア・セクシー 獣のようにもう一度; Moa sekushii: kemono no yo mō ichido | Akira Katō | Yoko Hatanaka; Amy Yokoyama; Ryuji Katagiri | |
| 1981-08-07 | Love Letter ラブレター; Rabu retaa | Yoichi [Azuma] Higashi | Keiko Sekine; Katsuo Nakamura; Mariko Kaga | |
| 1981-08-27 | Female Teacher In Rope Hell 団鬼六 女教師縄地獄; Dan Oniroku onna kyoshi nawajigoku | Shōgorō Nishimura | Junko Mabuki; Miki Yamaji | |
| 1981-08-27 | Gynecology Ward: "Caress Me Tenderly" 婦人科病棟 やさしくもんで; Fujin-ka byoto: yasashiku monde | Junichi Suzuki | Junko Asahina; Yukiko Tachibana; Asami Ogawa | |
| 1981-09-11 | 女高生 恥ずかしい瞬間; Jokōsei: hazukashii shunkan | Shinichi Shiratori | Mayumi Terajima | |
| 1981-09-11 | Poaching Wife: Frustrated Inside 密漁妻 奥のうずき; Mitsuryōzuma: okuno uzuki | Takashi Sugano | Maiko Kazama | |
| 1981-09-25 | 愛獣 赤い唇; Aiju: akai kuchibiru | Akira Katō | Jun Izumi | |
| 1981-09-25 | 肉体保険 ベッドでサイン; Nikutai hoken: bed de sain | Nobuaki Shirai | Nami Misaki | |
| 1981-10-09 | Zoom Up: Sexual Crime Report ズームアップ 暴行白書; Zoom up: boko hakusho | Katsuhiko Fujii | Yuki Kazamatsuri; Rie Hirase | 4th in the Zoom Up series. |
| 1981-10-09 | Female Gymnastic Teacher: "Step and Open" 女体育教師 跳んで開いて; Onna taiiku kyoshi: funde hiraite | Kōyū Ohara | Junko Asahina; Hiroyoshi Takemura; Mizuho Nakagawa | |
| 1981-10-23 | Fallen Angel Gang 悪女軍団; Akujo gundan | Masaru Konuma | Yuki Kazamatsuri; Jun Izumi; Eiko Yanami | |
| 1981-10-23 | Oh! Women: A Dirty Song 嗚呼！おんなたち 猥歌; A! onnatachi: waika | Tatsumi Kumashiro | Yuya Uchida; Reiko Nakamura; Yuriko Sumi | |
| 1981-11-13 | "My Girlfriend Wears a Uniform" 情婦はセーラー服; Iro wa sailor-fuku | Shōgorō Nishimura | Mayumi Terashima; Yoko Azusa; Kazuo Satake | |
| 1981-11-13 | Rapewoman: Dirty Sunday レイプウーマン 淫らな日曜日; Rapewoman: midarana nichiyobi | Yasuaki (Yasurō) Uegaki | Maiko Kazama; Naomi Ito; Tsuyoshi Naito | |
| 1981-11-27 | High School Girl's Diary 女高生偽日記; Jokōsei nise nikki | Nobuyoshi Araki | Rika Arai; Yoko Morimura; Koshiro Asami | |
| 1981-11-27 | Female Beautician Rope Discipline 団鬼六 女美容師縄飼育; Dan Oniroku onna biyoshi nawa shiiku | Hidehiro Ito | Junko Mabuki; Izumi Shima; Shin Nakamaru | |
| 1981-12-11 | 快楽温泉郷 女体風呂; Kairaku onsenkyō: nyotaiburo | Atsushi Fujiura | Nami Misaki | |
| 1981-12-25 | Sexy Pudding: Almost Addictive セクシー・ぷりん 癖になりそう; Sexy pudding: kuse ni narisō | Akira Katō | Yoko Hatanaka; Maiko Kazama | |
| 1981-12-25 | Angel Guts: Red Porno 天使のはらわた 赤い淫画; Tenshi no harawata: akai inga | Toshiharu Ikeda | Jun Izumi; Masahiko Abe; Kyoko Ito | 4th film in the 9-film Angel Guts series. Last produced as a Roman Porno. |

== 1982 ==
| Release date | Title | Director | Cast | Notes |
|---|---|---|---|---|
1982
| 1982-01-08 | Koichiro Uno's Wet and Riding 宇能鴻一郎の濡れて騎る; Uno Koichiro no nurete noru | Junichi Suzuki | Junko Asahina; Reiko Natsu; Jun Miho | 16th in the Koichiro Uno series. |
| 1982-01-08 | Beautiful Sisters: Seduced 美姉妹 犯す; Bishimai: okasu | Shōgorō Nishimura | Yuki Kazamatsuri; Chie Yamaguchi; Tsuyoshi Naito | A come-back effort from director Nishimura, who had been in a career slump. The film inspired two sequels. |
| 1982-01-22 | Slave Contract 奴隷契約書; Dorei keiyakusho | Masaru Konuma | Nami Matsukawa; Asami Ogawa; Jun Hongo | |
| 1982-01-22 | Pink Tush Girls: Slinking Classmates 桃尻同級生 まちぶせ; Momojiri dokyusei: machibuse | Kōyū Ohara | Mayumi Terashima; Ayako Ohta; Rika Takahara | |
| 1982-02-05 | Nurses' Journal: Animal In the Afternoon 看護婦日記 獣じみた午後; Kangofu nikki: kemono jimita gogo | Naosuke Kurosawa | Maiko Kazama; Jun Miho; Hide Ezumi | |
| 1982-02-05 | 女事務員 色情生活; Onna jimuin: shikijo seikatsu | Shinichi Shiratori | Maiko Kazama | |
| 1982-02-26 | Seiko's Juicy Thighs: Zoom Up ズームアップ 聖子の太腿; Seiko no futomomo: zoom up | Kōyū Ohara | Mayumi Terashima; Jun Ueno; Jun Hamaguchi | First in the Seiko's Juicy Thighs trilogy. |
| 1982-02-26 | Embraced By the Dark 闇に抱かれて; Yami ni dakarete | Kazunari Takeda | Yuki Kazamatsuri; Reiko Natsu; Osamu Tsuruoka | |
| 1982-03-12 | 女新入社員 5時から9時まで; Onna shinnyushain 5-ji kara 9-ji made | Katsuhiko Fujii | Junko Asahina | |
| 1982-03-26 | Young Girls' Holding Cell セーラー服鑑別所; Sailor-fuku kanbetsusho | Yoshihiro Kawasaki | Jun Miho; Mizuho Nakagawa; Chie Yamaguchi | |
| 1982-03-26 | Candidate For Seduction 犯され志願; Okasare shigan | Shun Nakahara | Yoshiko Ariake; Yuki Kazamatsuri; Hiroshi Unayama | |
| 1982-04-09 | Female Teacher: In Front of the Students 女教師 生徒の眼の前で; Onna kyoshi: seito no me no maede | Yasuaki (Yasurou) Uegaki | Lucia Santo; Rina Oka; Tōru Nakane | 5th film in the Female Teacher series. |
| 1982-04-09 | Live Recording: Secret Video 生録盗聴ビデオ; Namadori Tocho Video | Takashi Sugano | Maiko Kazama; Kazuyo Ezaki; Jun Nakahara | |
| 1982-04-23 | Madam Scandal: Let Me Die For 10 Seconds マダムスキャンダル 10秒死なせて; Madame Scandal: 10-byo shinasete | Shōgorō Nishimura | Midori Satsuki; Hosei Komatsu; Shin Nakamaru | |
| 1982-04-23 | Demon's Room 悪魔の部屋; Akuma no heya | Chūsei Sone | Reiko Nakamura; Johnny Ohkura; Ryohei Uchida | An erotic thriller film which became a hit. |
| 1982-05-14 | Indecent Family: Mother & Daughter ワイセツ家族 母と娘; Waisetsu kazoku: haha to musume | Hiroyuki Nasu | Izumi Shima; Koko Morimura; Akira Shioji | |
| 1982-05-14 | Woman In the Black Lingerie 黒い下着の女; Kuroi shitagi no onna | Nobuyuki Saito | Asako Kurayoshi; Chie Yamaguchi; Yudo Yoshikawa | |
| 1982-05-28 | Koichiro Uno's Teasing a Wife 宇能鴻一郎の人妻いじめ; Uno Koichiro no hitozuma ijime | Shinichi Shiratori | Mayumi Terashima; Yoko Azusa; Yuki Yoshizawa | 17th in the Koichiro Uno series. |
| 1982-05-28 | Slave Contract: Whip & High Heels 奴隷契約書 鞭とハイヒール; Dorei keiyakusho: muchi to highheels | Shun Nakahara | Nami Matsukawa; Akihiko Kanbara; Akira Sakai | |
| 1982-06-25 | Cabaret Diary キャバレー日記; Kyabaree nikki | Kichitaro Negishi | Midori Takei; Katsunobu Ito; Koichi Ueda | |
| 1982-06-25 | White Rose Campus: Then... Everybody Gets Raped 白薔薇学園 そして全員犯された; Shirobara Gakuen: soshite zenin okasareta | Kōyū Ohara | Nami Misaki; Ayako Ohta; Mayo Miyamoto | Three yakuza hijack a bus full of highschool girls. Torture, rape and bloody revenge follow. Released on underground video in the U.S. as I Spit on Your Bus. |
| 1982-07-09 | Marked Ama: Stirred-Up Shell くいこみ海女 乱れ貝; Kuikomi ama: midaregai | Atsushi Fujiura | Ryoko Watanabe; Maiko Kazama | |
| 1982-07-09 | Pleasure In the Mirror 鏡の中の悦楽; Kagami no naka no etsuraku | Shōgorō Nishimura | Junko Asahina; Yukiko Tachibana; Nobutaka Masutomi | |
| 1982-07-23 | Pink Curtain ピンクのカーテン; Pinku no kaaten | Yasuaki (Yasurou) Uegaki | Jun Miho; Masahiko Abe | First film in the controversial and popular Pink Curtain trilogy. |
| 1982-07-23 | Seiko's Juicy Thighs: Cheerleaders 聖子の太腿 ザ・チアガール; Seiko no futomomo: cheergirl | Yoshihiro Kawasaki | Mayumi Terashima; Yoko Morimura | 2nd in the Seiko's Juicy Thighs trilogy. |
| 1982-08-06 | Lady Karuizawa 軽井沢夫人; Karuizawa Fujin | Masaru Konuma | Miwa Takada; Takayuki Godai; Yumi Yoshikawa | |
| 1982-08-06 | Jealousy Game ジェラシー・ゲーム; Jealousy game | Yoichi [Azuma] Higashi | Reiko Ohshida; Yosuke Natsuki; Hiroaki Murakami | |
| 1982-08-28 | Hunting the Female Teacher 女教師狩り; Onna kyoshi gari | Junichi Suzuki | Yuki Kazamatsuri; Kyoko Ito; Hajime Inoue | 6th film in the Female Teacher series. |
| 1982-08-28 | Blue Woman 団鬼六 蒼いおんな; Dan Oniroku aoi onna | Katsuhiko Fujii | Izumi Shima; Kazuyo Ezaki | |
| 1982-09-15 | Live Act: Top Stripper (本)噂のストリッパー; Maruhon: uwasa no stripper | Yoshimitsu Morita | Kaori Okamoto; Yasuhiro Miyawaki; Nami Misaki | |
| 1982-09-15 | Serial Rape: Dirty Daydream 連続暴行 白昼の淫夢; Renzoku boko: hakuchu no inmu | Shōgorō Nishimura | Kaoru Mizuki; Makoto Yoshino; Waka Oda | |
| 1982-10-01 | Koichiro Uno's Female Doctor Is Also Wet 宇能鴻一郎の女医も濡れるの; Uno Koichiro no joi mo nureruno | Shinichi Shiratori | Junko Asahina; Yoko Morimura; Usagi Aso | 18th in the Koichiro Uno series. |
| 1982-10-01 | Flesh Slave: Sorrowful Toy 肉奴隷 悲しき玩具; Niku dorei: kanashiki gangu | Katsuhiko Fujii | Nami Matsukawa; Kazuyo Ezaki; Yoshinari Sumimoto | |
| 1982-10-15 | Gigolo: A Docu-Drama 実録色事師 ザ・ジゴロ; Jitsuroku irogotoshi: the gigolo | Kōyū Ohara | Ryoko Watanabe; Naoki Fushimi; Masayoshi Takigawa | |
| 1982-10-15 | Ecstasy Sisters 絶頂姉妹 堕ちる; Zeccho shimai ochiru | Naosuke Kurosawa | Asako Kurayoshi; Kazuyo Ezaki | |
| 1982-10-29 | Pink Curtain 2 ピンクのカーテン2; Pinku no kaaten II | Yasuaki (Yasurou) Uegaki | Jun Miho; Masahiko Abe | 2nd film in the Pink Curtain trilogy. |
| 1982-10-29 | Seiko's Juicy Thighs: Public Bath Beauty 聖子の太腿 女湯子町; Seiko no futomomo: onna-yu komachi | Shun Nakahara | Mayumi Terashima; Kaoru Mizuki; Koji Kobayashi | Last in the Seiko's Juicy Thighs trilogy. |
| 1982-10-29 | Anne's Lullaby あんねの子守唄; Anne no komori uta | Shōgorō Nishimura & 北畑秦啓 | Michiko Komori; Tokuko Watanabe; Yuki Yoshizawa | A sex-comedy starring rock star Michiko Komori. Another come-back hit for director Nishimura. |
| 1982-11-19 | Room of Shame 恥辱の部屋; Chijoku no heya | Kazunari Takeda | Yuki Kazamatsu; Shinobu Tsuruta; Toshiyuki Kitami | |
| 1982-11-19 | Comfort Tutor aka Tutor Whore aka Making the Grade 受験慰安婦; Juken ianpu | Takashi Kodama | Kaori Okamoto; Takuro Obata; Eri Anzai | |
| 1982-12-03 | 温泉芸者 湯舟で一発; Onsen geisha: yubune de 1patsu | Atsushi Fujiura | Nami Misaki | |
| 1982-12-03 | Girl and the Wooden Horse Torture 団鬼六 少女木馬責め; Dan Oniroku shōjo mokuba-zeme | Fumihiko Katō | Serina Nishikawa; Shiro Shimomoto; Kazuyo Ezaki | Katō's directorial debut |
| 1982-12-24 | Oh! Takarazuka! OH！タカラズカ; Oh ! Takarazuka!! | Kōyū Ohara | Jun Miho; Norimasa Tomizuka; Sumi Tamagawa | |
| 1982-12-24 | Red Scandal: Affair 赤いスキャンダル・情事; Akai scandal: jōji | Yoichi Takabayashi | Yuuki Mizuhara; Jun Izumi; Masako Togawa | |

== 1983 ==
| Release date | Title | Director | Cast | Notes |
|---|---|---|---|---|
1983
| 1983-01-07 | ホテルヒメ 火照る姫; Hoteru hime | Shōgorō Nishimura | Yuki Kazamatsuri | |
| 1983-01-07 | Rope and Breasts 縄と乳房; Nawa to chibusa | Masaru Konuma | Nami Matsukawa; Izumi Shima | |
| 1983-01-21 | Pink Cut: Love Me Big, Love Me Deep ピンクカット 太く愛して深く愛して; Pink cut: futoku aishite fukaku aishite | Yoshimitsu Morita | Mayumi Terashima; Mai Inoue; Ryoko Watanabe | |
| 1983-01-21 | Sexy Doll: Sada Abe III セクシードール 阿部定3世; Sexy doll: Abe Sada sansei | Takashi Sugano | Lucia Santo; Yoko Kashiyama; Hideaki Ezumi | |
| 1983-02-04 | An Older Girl's Juicy Thighs お姉さんの太腿; Onesan no futomomo | Junichi Suzuki | Kaori Okamoto; Hiroyuki Konishi; Hitomi Yuri | |
| 1983-02-04 | Assaulted Female Teacher 襲われる女教師; Osowareru onna kyōshi | Nobuyuki Saito | Yuki Kazamatsuri; Kate Asabuki | 7th film in the Female Teacher series. |
| 1983-02-25 | Koichiro Uno's Dirty Sisters' Barber Shoppe 宇能鴻一郎の姉妹理容師; Uno Koichiro no shimai riyōshi | Shun Nakahara | Mai Inoue; Yuki Yoshizawa | 19th in the Koichiro Uno series. |
| 1983-02-25 | Oniroku Dan's Snake Hole 団鬼六・蛇の穴; Dan Oniroku: hebi no ana | Katsuhiko Fujii | 志摩いずみ 花真衣 | |
| 1983-03-11 | ゴールドフィンガー もう一度奥まで; Gourudofingaa mō ichido okumade | Kōyū Ohara | Junko Asahina | |
| 1983-03-11 | Pornographic Ukiyo-E 春画; Shunga | Shōgorō Nishimura | Tomoko Ai; Makoto Yoshino; Megumi Ogawa | |
| 1983-03-25 | Anne's Diary あんねの日記; Anne no nikki | 北畑秦啓 | Michiko Komori; Ryoko Watanabe | (Sequel to Anne's Lullaby (1982)?) |
| 1983-03-25 | Zoom Up: Graduation Photos ズームアップ 卒業写真; Zoom up: sotsugyō shashin | Yoshihiro Kawasaki | Reiko Nakamura | 6th in the Zoom Up series. |
| 1983-03-25 | Pink Curtain 3 ピンクのカーテン3; Pinku no kaaten III | Yasuaki (Yasurou) Uegaki | Jun Miho; Masahiko Abe; Taro Mochizuki | Last film in the Pink Curtain trilogy. |
| 1983-04-15 | ポルノ女優志願; Poruno joyū shigan | Kōyū Ohara | Mina Asami | |
| 1983-04-25 | Woman With Pierced Nipples 乳首にピアスをした女; Chikubi ni piasu o shita onna | Shōgorō Nishimura | Jun Izumi; Usagi Aso; Kate Asabuki | A minor film from director Nishimura. |
| 1983-04-29 | Devil's Hostage 悪魔の人質; Akuma no hitojichi | Akira Katō | Kazumi Sawada; Mai Inoue; Naohiko Shigeta | |
| 1983-06-10 | Koichiro Uno's Wet and Leering 宇能鴻一郎の濡れて学ぶ; Uno Koichiro no nurete manabu | Junichi Suzuki | Kaori Okamoto; Madoka Minazuki | 20th in the Koichiro Uno series. |
| 1983-06-10 | Hunting for Lust 猟色; Ryoshoku | Hidehiro Ito | Akemi Hara; Kyoji Murayama | |
| 1983-06-24 | Lesbians In Uniforms セーラー服 百合族; Sailor-fuku yuri-zoku | Hiroyuki Nasu | Kaoru Oda; Natsuko Yamamoto | |
| 1983-06-24 | 色ざんげ; Irozange | Shōgorō Nishimura | Mina Asami | |
| 1983-07-08 | 3年目の浮気; Sannen me no uwaki | Shun Nakahara | Arisa Hayashi | |
| 1983-07-08 | Blue Rain Osaka ブルーレイン大阪; Buruu rein Ōsaka | Masaru Konuma | Kiriko Shimizu | |
| 1983-07-22 | Sexual Crime 性的犯罪; Seiteki hanzai | Yoichi Sai | Yuki Kazamatsuri; Lucia Santo; Makoto Yoshino | |
| 1983-07-22 | 少女暴行事件 赤い靴; Shōjo bōkōjiken: akai kutsu | Yasuaki (Yasurou) Uegaki | Mai Inoue | |
| 1983-08-05 | Double Bed ダブルベッド; Daburu beddo | Toshiya Fujita | Naoko Ohtani; Eri Ishida; Ittoku Kishibe | |
| 1983-08-25 | Beauty In Rope Hell 団鬼六 美女縄地獄; Dan Oniroku bijo nawajigoku | Genji Nakamura | Miki Takakura; Maya Ito | |
| 1983-08-25 | Crimson Night Dream 紅夜夢; Koyamu | Shōgorō Nishimura | Takako Shinozuka; Kazuyo Ezaki | True story of Oden Takahashi, a woman executed for murder, theft and prostitution during the Meiji Era. |
| 1983-09-16 | Lady's Triangle お嬢さんの股ぐら; Ojōsan no matagura | Atsushi Fujiura | Kate Asabuki; Akio Kaneda; Junko Asahina | |
| 1983-09-16 | のぞき; Nozoki | Kazunari Takeda | Mai Inoue | |
| 1983-09-16 | 女囚 檻 Joshū: ori | Masaru Konuma | Mina Asami | |
| 1983-09-17 | Dark Room 暗室; Anshitsu | Kirio Urayama | Koji Shimizu; Yuki Kazamatsuri; Takashi Terada | |
| 1983-10-14 | Lesbians In Uniforms 2 セーラー服 百合族2; Sailor-fuku yuri-zoku II | Hiroyuki Nasu | Natsuko Yamamoto; Kaoru Oda; Kotomi Aoki | |
| 1983-10-14 | Love Beast: Hunt 愛獣 猟る！ Aijū: asaru | Yasuaki (Yasurou) Uegaki | Kazumi Sawada; Serina Nishikawa; Yukiko Tachibana | Story of Japanese girls seeking erotic encounters with African-American U.S. servicemen in Yokosuka. |
| 1983-11-18 | Lolita House: Wet Junko ロリコンハウス おしめりジュンコ; Lolita hausu: oshimeri Junko | Fumihiko Katō | Kotomi Aoki; Yuko Mizushima; Asami Ogawa | |
| 1983-11-18 | Female Teacher: Twice Raped 女教師は二度犯される; Onna kyōshi wa nido okasareru | Shōgorō Nishimura | Kiriko Shimizu; Kosuke Yorita | 8th film in the Female Teacher series. The controversial series ended with this entry due to complaints from school and parent groups |
| 1983-12-02 | ケンちゃんのお姉さん; Ken-chan no oneesan | Takashi Kodama | Kaori Okamoto | |
| 1983-12-02 | Beauty Rope Cosmetology 団鬼六 美女縄化粧; Dan Oniroku bijo nawageshō | Katsuhiko Fujii | Miki Takakura; Kazuyo Ezaki | |
| 1983-12-02 | Banned: Woman's Secret Pictures 発禁・秘画のおんな; Hakkin: higa no onna | Naosuke Kurosawa | Mariko Nishina; Nami Misaki | |
| 1983-12-23 | Madam Scandal - Final Scandal: Madam Likes It Hard ファイナル・スキャンダル 奥様はお固いのがお好き; Final Scandal: okusama wa okatai no ga osuki | Masaru Konuma | Midori Satsuki; Kaori Okamoto; Takashi Shikauchi | |
| 1983-12-23 | Female Cats 女猫; Meneko | Shingo Yamashiro | Ai Saotome; Koichi Iwaki | |

== 1984 ==
| Release date | Title | Director | Cast | Notes |
|---|---|---|---|---|
1984
| 1984-01-13 | Beautiful Wrestlers: "Down For the Count" 美少女プロレス 失神10秒前; Bishōjo puro resu: shisshin 10-byo mae | Hiroyuki Nasu | Natsuko Yamamoto; Kaoru Oda; Mai Inoue | |
| 1984-02-03 | スキャンティドール 脱ぎたての香り; Sukyanti dooru: nugitate no kaori | 水谷俊之 | Kaoru Oda | |
| 1984-02-17 | Kōichirō Uno's Wet and Swinging 宇能鴻一郎の濡れて打つ; Uno Kōichirō no nurete utsu | Shūsuke Kaneko | Natsuko Yamamoto; Arisa Hayashi | 21st in the Koichiro Uno series. Shusuke Kaneko won the Yokohama Film Festival award for best new director for this film. |
| 1984-02-17 | Rope Sisters: Strange Fruit 縄姉妹 奇妙な果実; Nawa shimai: kimyōna kajitsu | Shun Nakahara | Makoto Yoshino; Naomi Hagio | |
| 1984-03-02 | 残酷！少女タレント; Sankoku! shōjo tarento | Yasuaki (Yasurō) Uegaki | 加来見由佳 | |
| 1984-03-02 | 女高生日記 乙女の祈り; Jokosei nikki: otome no niori | Yoshihiro Kawasaki | Kotomi Aoki | |
| 1984-03-02 | 白衣物語 淫す！ Hakui monogatari: insu! | Hidehiro Ito | Mina Asami | |
| 1984-03-16 | スチュワーデス・スキャンダル 獣のように抱きしめて; Suchuwaadesu*sukyandaru: kedamono no yō ni dakishimete | Masaru Konuma | Tomoko Ai | |
| 1984-03-16 | Best of S&M aka Oniroku Dan Presents the Best of Nikkatsu SM 団鬼六監修 SM大全集; SM daizenshū | Fumihiko Katō | Akio Shinguji | Documentary survey of Nikkatsu's films based on Oniroku Dan's writings. |
| 1984-04-06 | ニセ未亡人 いちじく白書; Nise mibōjin: ichijiku hakusho | Naosuke Kurosawa | Junko Asahina | |
| 1984-04-06 | 便利屋K子; Benriya K-ko | Nobuaki Shirai | 三原誠子 | |
| 1984-04-20 | 美加マドカ 指を濡らす女; Mika Madoka: yubi wo nurasu onna | Tatsumi Kumashiro | Madoka Mika | |
| 1984-04-20 | People of Twilight 夕ぐれ族; Yugure-zoku | Chūsei Sone | Yasuko Haru; Natsuko Yamamoto | Sone's penultimate pink film, made after he had lost enthusiasm for the genre. |
| 1984-05-11 | 不純な関係; Fujunna kankei | Shōgorō Nishimura | Ako Nakamura | |
| 1984-05-25 | 愛欲の日々 エクスタシー; Aiyoku no hibi: ekusutashii | Itsumichi Isomura | Yoriko Ogawa | |
| 1984-05-25 | Koichiro Uno's Dancer of Izu 宇能鴻一郎の伊豆の踊子; Uno Koichiro no Izu no odoriko | Atsushi Fujiura | Kate Asabuki | 22nd in the Koichiro Uno series. |
| 1984-05-25 | 団鬼六 修道女縄地獄; Dan Oniroku: shūdō onna nawa jigoku | Katsuhiko Fujii | Miki Takakura | |
| 1984-06-15 | Meow Meow Girl ニャンニャン娘; Nyan nyan-musume | Genji Nakamura | Mai Inoue; Izumi Aki | |
| 1984-06-15 | 丸茂ジュンの痴女伝説; Marumo Jun no chijo densetsu | Shōgorō Nishimura | Mina Asami | |
| 1984-06-29 | ロリータ妻 微熱; Roriita tsuma: binetsu | Naosuke Kurosawa | Natsuko Yamamoto | |
| 1984-06-29 | Elder Sister's Diary 姉日記; Ane nikki | Hiroyuki Nasu | Kaoru Oda; Asako Kurayoshi; Seiko Mihara | |
| 1984-06-29 | 赤いキャンパス 狂った放課後; Akai kyanpasu: kurutta hōkago | Kōyū Ohara | Mariko Nishina | |
| 1984-07-13 | ひと夏の出来ごころ; Hito natsu no deki gokoro | Fumihiko Katō | Kaori Okamoto | |
| 1984-07-13 | 踊る乳房; Odoru chibusa | Yoshihiro Kawasaki | Kate Asabuki | |
| 1984-07-13 | 秘色リース妻; Hishoku riisu tsuma | Nobuaki Shirai | Kiriko Shimizu | |
| 1984-07-27 | OL百合族19歳; OL yuri-zoku 19-sai | Shusuke Kaneko | Kaoru Oda; Natsuko Yamamoto | |
| 1984-07-27 | Eve's Flower Petal イヴちゃんの花びら; Eve-chan no hanabira | Shun Nakahara | Eve; Saeko Kizuki | |
| 1984-08-10 | Gemini Woman 双子座の女; Futago-za no onna | Shingo Yamashiro | Yuki Igarashi; Shoko Ariake; Koji Nanjo | |
| 1984-09-01 | Female College Dorm Vs Nursing School Dormitory 女子大寮VS看護婦学園寮; Joshidai-ryo vs kango gakuen-ryo | Nobuyuki Saito | Mina Asami; Makoto Yoshino | |
| 1984-09-01 | Rope Torture 団鬼六 縄責め; Dan Oniroku nawazeme | Ikuo Sekimoto | Miki Takakura; Kaori Takahashi | |
| 1984-09-15 | スケバン株式会社 やっちゃえ！お嬢さん; Sukeban kabushikigaisha: yacchae! ojōsan | Kōyū Ohara | Ritsuko Sekine | |
| 1984-09-15 | Debauchery: Salome's Lips 猟色 サロメの唇; Ryōshoku: Sarome no kuchibiru | Katsuhiko Fujii | Ryoko Watanabe | |
| 1984-09-29 | 未熟な下半身; Mijukuna kahanshin | Nobuyuki Saito | Kotomi Aoki | |
| 1984-09-29 | 蘭の肉体; Ran no nikutai | Shōgorō Nishimura | Kaoru Oda | |
| 1984-11-03 | イヴちゃんの姫; Ibuchan no hime | Shusuke Kaneko | Eve | |
| 1984-11-03 | ヴァージンなんて怖くない; Baajin nante kowakunai | Hiroyuki Nasu | Miyuki Kamata; Mari Somei | |
| 1984-11-03 | 私の中の娼婦; Watakushi no naka no shōfu | Kazunari Takeda | Miyako Tasaka | |
| 1984-11-23 | 主婦と性生活; Shufu to sei seikatsu | Yasuhiro Horiuchi | Jun Izumi | |
| 1984-12-08 | 柔肌色くらべ; Yawahada shoku kurabe | Masaru Konuma | Mariko Nishina | |
| 1984-12-08 | 女子大生 温泉芸者; Joshidaisei: onsen geisha | Atsushi Fujiura | Kate Asabuki | |
| 1984-12-22 | Tattoo 刺青 IREZUMI; Irezumi | Chūsei Sone | Sakiko Ito; Kazumi Sawada; Ryo Kinomoto | Pink film version of a 1966 Daiei film. |
| 1984-12-22 | 初夜の海; Shoya no umi | Shun Nakahara | Kaoru Oda | |

== 1985 ==
| Release date | Title | Director | Cast | Notes |
|---|---|---|---|---|
1985
| 1985-01-15 | High School Teacher: Maturing 高校教師 成熟; Kōkō kyōshi: seijuku | Shōgorō Nishimura | Rei Akasaka; Ryoko Watanabe | |
| 1985-01-15 | Double Rope Torture 団鬼六 緊縛卍責め; Dan Oniroku kinbaku manji-zeme | Ikuo Sekimoto | Miki Takakura; Kaori Aso | |
| 1985-02-02 | 看護婦女子寮 いじわるな指; Kango fujoshiryō: ijiwaruna yubi | Yoshihiro Kawasaki | Jun Izumi | |
| 1985-02-23 | Eve Is Getting Wet イヴの濡れてゆく; Eve-chan no nurete yuku | Osamu Murakami | Eve; Akira Numuri | |
| 1985-03-09 | Beautiful Sisters: Skin! 美姉妹 剥ぐ！ Bishimai: hagu! | Yasuaki (Yasurou) Uegaki | Rei Akasaka; Kaoru Oda; Takeshi Ōbayashi | Sequel to Beautiful Sisters: Seduced (1982). |
| 1985-03-23 | Wives' Rape Mansion 人妻暴行マンション; Hitozuma boko mansion | Nobuyuki Saito | Ryoko Watanabe; Kaoru Mizuki | |
| 1985-03-23 | 制服白百合族 悪い遊び; Seifuku shirayurizoku: warui asobi | Kōyū Ohara | Mami Mochizuki | |
| 1985-04-06 | Koichiro Uno's Caressing the Peach 宇能鴻一郎の桃さぐり; Uno Koichiro no momosaguri | Shōgorō Nishimura | Rei Akasaka; Mayuko Mizushima | 23rd in the Koichiro Uno series. |
| 1985-04-20 | (金)(ビ)の金魂巻 (Kin)(bi)no kintamashii maki | Kazuyuki Izutsu | Hajime Shikumo; Masahiro Kobayashi | |
| 1985-04-20 | Minna Agechau みんなあげちゃう | Shusuke Kaneko | Natsumi Asano | |
| 1985-05-22 | Young Flesh Slave 制服肉奴隷; Reijo niku-dorei | Junichi Suzuki | Rei Akasaka; Aki Hayasaka | |
| 1985-06-09 | まってました転校生！ Mattemashita tenkōsei! | Katsuhiro Fujii | Keizō Kanie | |
| 1985-07-20 | Office Love: Sanctuary At Noon オフィス・ラブ 真昼の禁猟区; Office love: mahiru no kinryoku | Yasuaki (Yasurou) Uegaki | Rei Akasaka; Kurumi Jogenji | |
| 1985-07-20 | 絶倫海女しまり貝; Zetsurin ama shimari kai | Atsushi Fujiura | Megumi Kiyosato | |
| 1985-08-03 | Love Hotel ラブホテル; Rabu hoteru | Shinji Somai | Noriko Hayami; Takashi Terada; Kiriko Shimizu | |
| 1985-08-24 | Flower and Snake: Sketch of Hell 花と蛇 地獄篇; Hana to hebi: jigoku-ben | Shōgorō Nishimura | Kaori Aso; Mami Fujimura | First in Flower and Snake series. |
| 1985-08-24 | 令嬢肉奴隷; Reijō niku dorei | Junichi Suzuki | Rei Akasaka | |
| 1985-09-07 | タブーX倒錯; Taboo X tōsaku | Hiroyuki Nasu | Chiaki Minami | |
| 1985-09-07 | Woman In the Box: Virgin Sacrifice 箱の中の女 処女いけにえ; Hako no naka no onna: shojo ikenie | Masaru Konuma | Reiko Aoi; Saeko Kizuki; Kojiro Kusanagi | Nikkatsu tampered with Konuma's original script, resulting in this "hardcore" film. The agreed to let Konuma film the original script later as Woman In the Box 2 (1988), which critics consider a superior film. |
| 1985-10-12 | Female Bank Teller: Rape Office 女銀行員 暴行オフィス; Onna ginko-in: boko office | Shōgorō Nishimura | Kaori Aso; Saeko Kizuki; Kaya Kiyomoto | |
| 1985-11-16 | Mariko オーガズム 真理子; Orgasm Mariko | Fumihiko Katō | Megumi Kiyosato | |
| 1985-11-16 | Dream Crimes 夢犯; Yume han | Naosuke Kurosawa | Kiriko Shimizu | |
| 1985-12-14 | Beautiful Teacher in Torture Hell 団鬼六 美教師地獄責め; Dan Oniroku: bikyōshi jigoku seme | Masahito Segawa | Ran Masaki; Izumi Shima | |
| 1985-12-27 | Female Leopard 女豹; Mehyō | Kōyū Ohara | Kozue Tanaka; Minako Ogawa | |

== 1986 ==
| Release date | Title | Director | Cast | Notes |
|---|---|---|---|---|
1986
| 1986-01-18 | Beautiful Sisters Flesh Slaves 美姉妹肉奴隷; Bishimai Nikudorei | Katsuhiko Fujii | Akasaka; Megumi Kiyosato; Kiriko Shimizu | |
| 1986-01-18 | 凌辱めす市場 監禁; Ryōjoku mesu ichiba: kankin | Yasuaki (Yasurō) Uegaki | | |
| 1986-02-22 | スワップ診察室 密しぶき; Swappu shinsatsushitsu: mitsushibuki | Atsushi Fujiura | Megumi Kiyosato; Kate Asabuki | |
| 1986-03-08 | 花と蛇 飼育篇; Hana to hebi: shiikuhen | Shōgorō Nishimura | Minako Ogawa | |
| 1986-03-08 | 女医肉奴隷; Joi niku dorei | Katsuhiko Fujii | Kaori Asō | |
| 1986-03-26 | マダム・サド 牝地獄; Madamu Sado: mesu jigoku | Yoshihiro Kawasaki | Yuko Mizushima | |
| 1986-04-12 | 強制ワイセツ犯 性魔; Kyōsei waisetsuhan: seima | Takashi Kodama | Megumi Kiyosato | |
| 1986-04-12 | 赤い禁猟区 ハードコアの夜; Akai kinryōku: haado koa no yoru | Shōgorō Nishimura | Kaori Asō | |
| 1986-04-12 | 薄毛の19才; Usuge no 19-sai | Yasuhiro Horiuchi | Miwako Sugihara | |
| 1986-06-14 | レイプハンター 通り魔; Reipu hantaa: toorima | Fumihiko Katō | Kaori Asō; Mami Sakaki | |
| 1986-07-12 | Mischievous Lolita: Attacking the Virgin From Behind いたずらロリータ 後からバージン; Itazura lolita: ushiro kara baajin | Shusuke Kaneko | Yuko Mizushima; Akio Kaneda; Mizuho Nakagawa | |
| 1986-07-26 | いんこう; Inkō | Masaru Konuma | Kaori Asō | |
| 1986-07-26 | 瓶詰め地獄; Binzume jigoku | Yoshihiro Kawasaki | Chiyako Ogura; Minako Ogawa; Hitomi Kobayashi | |
| 1986-08-23 | Young Lady Ashiya: Sacrifice 芦屋令嬢 いけにえ; Ashiya reijō: ikenie | Kenichi Ikeda | Yuki Amano; Saeko Kizuki; Ayu Kiyokawa | |
| 1986-08-23 | Snake and Whip 団鬼六 蛇と鞭; Dan Oniroku hebi to muchi | Shōgorō Nishimura | Ran Masaki; Izumi Shima | |
| 1986-09-23 | (生)ビデオルーム なまつば愛撫 (Sei)bideo roomu: namazubo aibu | Atsushi Fujiura | Megumi Kiyosato | |
| 1986-10-31 | 白バラ学院 わいせつな放課後; Shirobara gakuin: waisetsuna hōkago | Takeshi Kitamura | Kaori Asō | |
| 1986-10-31 | Adultery 不倫; Furin | Chūsei Sone | Miyuki Kojima; Kyoko Takara; Sho Nagareyamaji | Sone's last Roman Porno. Due to the pink film's loss of audience to the Adult Video, a box-office failure despite being one of his better films. |
| 1986-12-06 | Flower and Snake: White Uniform Rope Slave 花と蛇 白衣縄奴隷; Hana to hebi: hakui nawa dorei | Shōgorō Nishimura | Ran Masaki; Minako Ogawa | 2nd in Flower and Snake series. |
| 1986-12-20 | Time Escapade: 5 Seconds Til Climax タイム・アバンチュール 絶頂5秒前; Time adventure: zeccho 5-byo mae | Yōjirō Takita | Kozue Tanaka; Kaori Sugita | |
| 1986-12-20 | Bed-In ベッド・イン; Beddo-in | Masaru Konuma | Miki Yanagi; Rie Kitahara | |

== 1987 ==
| Release date | Title | Director | Cast | Notes |
|---|---|---|---|---|
1987
| 1987-01-06 | Hitomi Kobayashi's Secret Pleasure aka Secret Pleasure: Amorous 奥戯快感 艶 Ōgi kaikan: tsuya | Kenichi Ikeda | Hitomi Kobayashi | |
| 1987-01-24 | Beautiful Sisters: Panting! 美姉妹 喘ぐ; Bishimai: aegu | Yasuaki (Yasurou) Uegaki | Kaori Aso; Megumi Kiyosato | Second sequel to Beautiful Sisters: Seduced (1982). |
| 1987-01-24 | 蘭光生 肉飼育; Ran Mitsuo: niku shiiku | Yoshihiro Kawasaki | Minako Ogawa | |
| 1987-04-28 | Sisters to Be Sacrificed 団鬼六 生贄姉妹; Dan Oniroku ikenie shimai | Shōgorō Nishimura | Minako Ogawa; Miyuki Matsumoto | |
| 1987-04-28 | Erotic Seduction: Flesh Bondage 妖艶 肉縛り; Yoen: niku shibari | Junichi Suzuki | Shihori Nagasaka; Taro Kohira | |
| 1987-06-20 | Female Inquisitor 拷問貴婦人; Gōmon kifujin | Kazuo "Gaira" Komizu | Keiko Asano]] Saeko Kizuki; Ayu Kiyokawa | |
| 1987-08-08 | Itoshino Half Moon 愛しのハーフ・ムーン | Yōjirō Takita | Maiko Itō | Won "Best Screenplay" award at the Yokohama Film Festival |
| 1987-08-29 | 美味しい女たち; Oishii onnatachi | Shōgorō Nishimura | Michiko Nishiwaki; Yuko Mizushima | |
| 1987-09-19 | 痴漢サギ師 まさぐる指先; Chikan sakishi: masakuru yubisaki | Atsushi Fujiura | Yoko Takagi | |
| 1987-10-17 | Angel Guts: Red Rope - "Until I Expire!" 赤い縄 ～果てるまで～ Tenshi no harawata: akai nawa hateru made | Junichi Suzuki | Kanako Kishi; Masahiko Abe; Mizuho Nakagawa | |
| 1987-10-17 | 団鬼六 人妻なぶり; Dan Oniroku: Hitozuma Naburi | Shūji Kataoka | Shihori Nagasaka; Rena Hatta; Shirō Shimomoto | |
| 1987-10-31 | スペシャルONANIE; Supesharu onanie | Masahito Segawa | Mizuki Kanou | |
| 1987-11-21 | い・ん・び; I*n*bi | Shu Mikawa | Mami Ogawa | |
| 1987-11-21 | 制服くずし; Seifuku kuzushi | Yasuhiro Horiuchi | Madoka Misaki | |
| 1987-12-05 | Flower and Snake: Ultimate Rope Discipline 花と蛇 究極縄調教; Hana to hebi: kyūkyoku nawa chōkyō | Masayuki Asao | Mai Hayami; Kaoru Mizuki | 3rd and last in Flower and Snake series. |
| 1987-12-05 | Women In Heat Behind Bars 檻の中の欲しがる女たち; Ori no naka no hoshigaru onnatachi | Junichi Suzuki | Mako Takigawa; Saeko Kizuki; Makoto Kobayashi | |
| 1987-12-19 | Waiting Wet Woman 待ち濡れた女; Machi nureta onna | Yasuaki (Yasuru) Uegaki | Akiko Nakamura; Akira Watanabe | |
| 1987-12-19 | Hitomi Kobayashi's Young Girl's Story 小林ひとみの令嬢物語; Kobayashi Hitomi no reijō monogatari | Kenichi Ikeda | Hitomi Kobayashi; Mizuho Nakagawa | |

== 1988 ==
| Release date | Title | Director | Cast | Notes |
|---|---|---|---|---|
1988
| 1988-01-09 | Angel to Be Sacrificed いけにえ天使; Ikenie tenshi | Katsuhiko Fujii | Mayako Katsuragi; Izumi Shima | |
| 1988-01-09 | 輪舞 ＜りんぶ＞ Rinbu | Masaru Konuma | Kaori Asō | |
| 1988-01-23 | 冴島奈緒 アクメ記念日; Nao Saejima: akume kinenbi | Masahito Segawa | Nao Saejima | |
| 1988-02-10 | ナ・ン・パ＜軟派＞ Na*n*pa | Masato Hironishi | Yōko Fujita | |
| 1988-02-27 | シンデレラ・エクスタシー 黒い瞳の誘惑; Shinderera * ekusutashii: kuroi hitomi no yūwaku | Yoshihiro Kawasaki | Mizuki Kanou; Yoko Takagi; Yuko Maehara | |
| 1988-02-27 | Woman In the Box 2 aka Captured For Sex 4 箱の中の女2; Hako no naka no onna II | Masaru Konuma | Ryouta Nakanishi; Shihori Nagasaka; Miyuki Kawamura | Follow-up to Woman In the Box: Virgin Sacrifice (1985), director Konuma's original, superior version of the story. |
| 1988-03-19 | うれしはずかし物語; Ureshi hazukashi monogatari | Yoichi [Azuma] Higashi | Maiko Kawakami | |
| 1988-03-19 | 猫のように; Neko no yō ni | Shun Nakahara | Kimiko Yoshimiya | |
| 1988-04-23 | BU・RA・Iの女; Bu*ra*i no onna | Osamu Murakami | 平歩千佳 | |
| 1988-04-23 | Last Cabaret ラスト・キャバレー; Rasuto * kyabaree | Shusuke Kaneko | Miyuki Kato; Yasuo Daichi; Ko Watanabe | An allegorical requiem for Nikkatsu studios. |
| 1988-05-14 | Exotic Mask In Hell 団鬼六 妖艶能面地獄; Dan Oniroku Yoen Nomen Jigoku | Fumihiko Katō | Yoshimi Kashiwagi; Minako Ogawa; Shihori Nagasaka | |
| 1988-05-28 | ラブ・ゲームは終わらない; Rabu * geemu wa owaranai | Katsuji Kanazawa | Yukari Takeda; Mako Takigawa | |
| 1988-05-28 | Bed Partner ベッド・パートナー BED PARTNER; Bed Partner | Daisuke Gotō | Kyoko Hirota; Shuichi Nagano; Yoko Takaki | Last Nikkatsu Roman Porno. |
| 1988-06-11 | That's Roman Porno: Smile of Goddesses ザッツ・ロマンポルノ 女神たちの微笑み; That's roman porno: megami-tachi no hohoemi | Takashi Kodama | | Documentary compilation of over 100 clips from throughout the Roman Porno series. |

== 2010 (Reboot) ==
| Release date | Title | Director | Cast | Notes |
|---|---|---|---|---|
2010
| 2010-02-13 | Apartment Wife: Affair In the Afternoon 団地妻・昼下りの情事; Danchizuma hirusagari no jōji | Shun Nakahara | Sakiko Takao Masaki Miura Kazuko Shirakawa | Remake from the original 1971 movie with the same name |
| 2010-02-27 | Any and Every Which Way 後後ろから前から; Ushiro Kara Mae Kara | Shōichirō Masumoto | Tomomi Miyauchi Kotono Yoshiki Kanahashi | Remake from the original 1980 movie with the same name |

== 2016 (Reboot Project) ==
| Release date | Title | Director | Cast | Notes |
|---|---|---|---|---|
2016
| 2016-11-26 | Aroused by Gymnopedies ジムノペディに乱れる | Isao Yukisada | Itsuji Itao; Sumire Ashina; Izumi Okamura | |
| 2016-12-17 | Wet Woman in the Wind 風に濡れた女 | Akihiko Shiota | Tasuku Nagaoka; Yuki Mamiya; Ryushin Tei | |

== See also ==
- Pink film

== Sources ==
- Allmovie
- Internet Movie Database
- Japanese Movie Database
- Sharp, Jasper (2008). Behind the Pink Curtain: The Complete History of Japanese Sex Cinema. Guildford: FAB Press. ISBN 978-1-903254-54-7.
- Weisser, Thomas; Yuko Mihara Weisser (1998). Japanese Cinema Encyclopedia: The Sex Films. Miami: Vital Books : Asian Cult Cinema Publications. ISBN 1-889288-52-7.
