= List of Japanese sexploitation films =

This is a chronological listing of notable Japanese sexploitation films. The list includes film genres which employ sex and nudity as a main focus, such as pink film, Nikkatsu Roman Porno films, and Toei porno. This list also includes articles on Japanese AVs (adult videos).

== 1960s ==
Release date	Title	Director	Cast	Studio(s)
1962
February 27, 1962	Flesh Market	Satoru Kobayashi	Tamaki Katori	Ōkura (later OP Eiga)
1963
May 15, 1963	Women... Oh, Women!	Tetsuji Takechi		Sano Art Productions; Shochiku
1964
June 21, 1964	Daydream	Tetsuji Takechi	Kanako Michi; Akira Ishihama; Chojuro Hanakawa	Shochiku
1966
July 1966	The Embryo Hunts in Secret	Kōji Wakamatsu	Hatsuo Yamatani; Miharu Shima	Wakamatsu Productions
August 1966	The Bite	Kan Mukai	Senjo Ichiriki; Michiko Shiroyami	Kokuei; Tōkyō Geijutsu Pro
1967
1967	Bed Dance	Toshio Okuwaki	Setsu Shimizu; Naomi Tani; Machiko Sakyō	World Eiga
1967	Memoirs of Modern Love: Curious Age	Shin'ya Yamamoto	Naomi Tani; Yumiko Matsumoto; Miki Hayashi	Watanabe Pro; Tōkyō Kōei
February 21, 1967	Birth Control Revolution	Masao Adachi	Mikio Terajima; Kozue Kashima	Wakamatsu Productions; Nihon Cinema
July 2, 1967	Sexy Partners	Kan Mukai	Michiko Sakyō; Jōji Ohara	Mutsukuni Eiga
July 11, 1967	Slave Widow	Mamoru Watanabe	Noriko Tatsumi; Mari Iwai; Naomi Tani	Mutsukuni Eiga; Chuo Eiga
October 3, 1967	Inflatable Sex Doll of the Wastelands	Atsushi Yamatoya	Noriko Tatsumi; Yūichi Minato	Kokuei
October 28, 1967	Cruel Map of Women's Bodies	Masanao Sakao	Naomi Tani	Ōkura Eiga
December 26, 1967	Perverted Criminal	Kōji Seki	Setsu Shimizu; Shūhei Mutō	Shin Nihon Eiga Kenkyūsha; Nihon Cinema
1968
March 1968	Blue Film: Estimation	Kan Mukai	Mari Nagisa; Kemi Ichiboshi; Norihiro Ōtani	Mukai Productions; Nihon Geijutsu Kyokai; Wakamatsu Productions; Kantō Movies
April 1968	Absolutely Secret: Girl Torture	Kiyoshi Komori	Naomi Tani	Kōei; Shintōhō Eiga
April 13, 1968	Front Row Life	Tatsumi Kumashiro	Hatsue Tonooka	Nikkatsu
September 1968	Love Hotel	Shin'ya Yamamoto	Mieko Tanabe; Kako Tachibana; Akiko Kozuki	Tōkyō Kōei; Shintōhō Eiga
September 7, 1968	Ukiyo-e Cruel Story	Tetsuji Takechi	Tamawa Karina; Noriko Tatsumi; Ryuji Inazuma	Takechi Productions; Daiei
September 28, 1968	Shogun's Joys of Torture	Teruo Ishii	Yuki Kagawa; Asao Koike	Toei
October 1968	Modern Female Ninja: Flesh Hell	Kan Mukai	Kozue Katori; Mari Nagisa	Mukai Productions; Kantō Movies
1969
1969	Go, Go, Second Time Virgin	Kōji Wakamatsu	Michio Akiyama; Mimi Kozakura	Wakamatsu Productions
January 1969	Blue Film Woman	Kan Mukai	Mitsugu Fujii	Kokuei

== 1970s ==
Release date	Title	Director	Cast	Studio(s)
1970
May 2, 1970	Alleycat Rock: Female Boss	Yasuharu Hasebe	Akiko Wada; Meiko Kaji	Nikkatsu
1971
November 20, 1971	Apartment Wife: Affair In the Afternoon	Shōgorō Nishimura	Kazuko Shirakawa	Nikkatsu
November 20, 1971	Castle Orgies	Isao Hayashi	Setsuko Ogawa; Yoichi Nishikawa	Nikkatsu
December 1, 1971	Coed Report: Yuko's White Breasts	Yukihiko Kondo	Yūko Katagiri	Nikkatsu
1972
1972-1973	Terrifying Girls' High School	Norifumi Suzuki; Masahiro Shimura	Reiko Ike; Miki Sugimoto	Toei; 4-film series
January 18, 1972	Love Hunter	Seiichirō Yamaguchi	Hidemi Hara; Mari Tanaka; Sumiko Minami	Nikkatsu
February 9, 1972	Beads from a Petal	Noboru Tanaka	Rie Nakagawa; Keiko Maki	Nikkatsu
March 31, 1972	Ecstasy of the Angels	Kōji Wakamatsu	Ken Yoshizawa; Rie Yokoyama; Yuki Arasa	Wakamatsu Productions
July 19, 1972	Woman on the Night Train	Noboru Tanaka	Mari Tanaka; Keiko Tsuzuki; Tomoko Katsura	Nikkatsu
August 12, 1972	Girl Boss Guerilla	Norifumi Suzuki	Miki Sugimoto; Reiko Ike	Toei
August 25, 1972	Female Convict 701: Scorpion	Shunya Itō	Meiko Kaji; Rie Yokoyama	Toei
October 7, 1972	Ichijo's Wet Desire	Tatsumi Kumashiro	Sayuri Ichijō; Hiroko Isayama; Kazuko Shirakawa	Nikkatsu
November 29, 1972	Lusty Sisters	Chūsei Sone	Keiko Tsuzuki; Akemi Nijō	Nikkatsu
December 27, 1972	Naked Seven	Yasuharu Hasebe	Mari Tanaka	Nikkatsu
December 30, 1972	Female Prisoner Scorpion: Jailhouse 41	Shunya Itō	Meiko Kaji; Fumio Watanabe	Toei
1973
February 17, 1973	Sex & Fury	Norifumi Suzuki	Reiko Ike; Christina Lindberg; Akemi Negishi	Toei
March 31, 1973	Terrifying Girls' High School: Lynch Law Classroom	Norifumi Suzuki	Reiko Ike; Miki Sugimoto	Toei
March 24, 1973	Lovers Are Wet	Tatsumi Kumashiro	Rie Nakagawa; Toru Ōe	Nikkatsu
June 23, 1973	Retreat Through the Wet Wasteland	Yukihiro Sawada	Yuri Yamashina; Takeo Chii	Nikkatsu
July 29, 1973	Female Prisoner Scorpion: Beast Stable	Shunya Itō	Meiko Kaji; Mikio Narita	Toei
November 3, 1973	The World of Geisha	Tatsumi Kumashiro	Junko Miyashita; Naomi Oka	Nikkatsu
December 29, 1973	Female Convict Scorpion: Grudge Song	Yasuharu Hasebe	Meiko Kaji; Masakazu Tamura	Toei
1974
February 16, 1974	School of the Holy Beast	Norifumi Suzuki	Yumi Takigawa; Fumio Watanabe; Emiko Yamauchi	Toei
June 22, 1974	Flower and Snake	Masaru Konuma	Naomi Tani; Nagatoshi Sakamoto	Nikkatsu
August 3, 1974	Female Ninja Magic: 100 Trampled Flowers	Chūsei Sone	Junko Miyashita	Nikkatsu
October 26, 1974	Wife to Be Sacrificed	Masaru Konuma	Naomi Tani; Nagatoshi Sakamoto; Terumi Azuma	Nikkatsu
1975
February 8, 1975	A Woman Called Sada Abe	Noboru Tanaka	Junko Miyashita; Hideaki Esumi	Nikkatsu
April 26, 1975	Cruelty: Black Rose Torture	Katsuhiko Fujii	Naomi Tani; Terumi Azuma	Nikkatsu
June 18, 1975	Oryu's Passion: Bondage Skin	Katsuhiko Fujii	Naomi Tani; Terumi Azuma	Nikkatsu
July 1, 1975	Tokyo Emmanuelle	Akira Katō	Kumi Taguchi	Nikkatsu
November 22, 1975	Banned Book: Flesh Futon	Nobuaki Shirai	Hajime Tanimoto; Terumi Azuma	Nikkatsu
December 6, 1975	Deep Throat in Tokyo	Kan Mukai	Kumi Taguchi	Toei
1976
January 8, 1976	Cloistered Nun: Runa's Confession	Masaru Konuma	Runa Takamura; Kumi Taguchi	Nikkatsu
June 12, 1976	Watcher in the Attic	Noboru Tanaka	Junko Miyashita	Nikkatsu
July 7, 1976	Assault! Jack the Ripper	Yasuharu Hasebe	Tamaki Katsura; Yutaka Hayashi	Nikkatsu
September 25, 1976	Tattooed Flower Vase	Masaru Konuma	Naomi Tani; Takako Kitagawa	Nikkatsu
December 8, 1976	Lady Moonflower	Katsuhiko Fujii	Naomi Tani	Nikkatsu
1977
February 22, 1977	Rape! 13th Hour	Yasuharu Hasebe	Akira Takahashi; Yuri Yamashina; Yūdai Ishiyama	Nikkatsu
February 22, 1977	Erotic Diary of an Office Lady	Masaru Konuma	Asami Ogawa; Michio Hino	Nikkatsu
February 23, 1977	Beauty's Exotic Dance: Torture!	Noboru Tanaka	Junko Miyashita; Hatsuo Yamaya; Maya Kudō	Nikkatsu
June 4, 1977	Fairy in a Cage	Kōyū Ohara	Naomi Tani	Nikkatsu
August 20, 1977	Lady Chatterley In Tokyo	Katsuhiko Fujii	Izumi Shima	Nikkatsu
October 1, 1977	Fascination: Portrait of a Lady	Kōyū Ohara	Naomi Tani	Nikkatsu
1978
1978–1994	Angel Guts	Chūsei Sone; Noboru Tanaka; Toshiharu Ikeda; Hiroyuki Nasu; Junichi Suzuki; Takashi Ishii		Nikkatsu; 9-film series
February 4, 1978	Attacked!!	Yasuharu Hasebe	Asami Ogawa; Yōko Azusa	Nikkatsu
April 1, 1978	Lady Black Rose	Shōgorō Nishimura	Naomi Tani	Nikkatsu
April 29, 1978	Pink Tush Girl	Kōyū Ohara	Kaori Takeda; Ako; Yūko Katagiri	Nikkatsu
June 24, 1978	Rope Hell	Kōyū Ohara	Naomi Tani	Nikkatsu
December 2, 1978	Rope Cosmetology	Shōgorō Nishimura	Naomi Tani	Nikkatsu
December 23, 1978	Invisible Man: Rape!	Isao Hayashi	Izumi Shima	Nikkatsu
1979
February 17, 1979	Woman with Red Hair	Tatsumi Kumashiro	Junko Miyashita; Renji Ishibashi	Nikkatsu
April 28, 1979	Pink Tush Girl: Love Attack	Kōyū Ohara	Kahori Takeda; Ako	Nikkatsu
June 1979	Virgin Rope Makeover	Mamoru Watanabe	Mayuko Hino; Naomi Oka	Shintōhō Eiga
July 21, 1979	Rope and Skin	Shōgorō Nishimura	Naomi Tani	Nikkatsu
September 8, 1979	Zoom Up: Rape Site	Kōyū Ohara	Erina Miyai	Nikkatsu
September 22, 1979	Wet Weekend	Kichitaro Negishi	Junko Miyashita	Nikkatsu
October 27, 1979	Star of David: Beautiful Girl Hunter	Norifumi Suzuki	Shun Domon	Nikkatsu

== 1980s ==
Release date	Title	Director	Cast	Studio(s)
1980
March 15, 1980	Zoom In: Rape Apartments	Naosuke Kurosawa	Yoko Azusa; Erina Miyai	Nikkatsu
October 1980	Girl Mistress	Banmei Takahashi	Cecile Gōda; Satoshi Miyata; Shirō Shimomoto	Kokuei; Takahashi Productions; Shintōhō Eiga
1981
January 9, 1981	Woman Who Exposes Herself	Masaru Konuma	Maiko Kazama; Izumi Shima	Nikkatsu
January 23, 1981	Office Lady Rope Slave	Katsuhiko Fujii	Junko Mabuki	Nikkatsu
March 1981	Scarlet Prostitute: Stabbing	Genji Nakamura	Yuka Asagiri; Atsushi Imaizumi; Maria Satsuki	Million Film
April 24, 1981	Crazy Fruit	Kichitaro Negishi	Yuki Ninagawa; Yūji Honma	Nikkatsu
September 12, 1981	Daydream	Tetsuji Takechi	Kyōko Aizome	
1982
September 1982	Raped with Eyes: Daydream	Toshiyuki Mizutani	Kazuhiro Yamaji; Shinobu Nami; Makoto Yoshino	Shintōhō Eiga
1983
January 7, 1983	Rope and Breasts	Masaru Konuma	Nami Satsuma	Nikkatsu
August, 1983	Kandagawa Pervert Wars	Kiyoshi Kurosawa	Usagi Asō	Million Film
December 23, 1983	Female Cats	Shingo Yamashiro	Ai Saotome	Nikkatsu
1984
February 17, 1984	Kōichirō Uno's Wet and Swinging	Shūsuke Kaneko	Natsuko Yamamoto; Arisa Hayashi	Nikkatsu
1985
August 3, 1985	Love Hotel	Shinji Sōmai	Noriko Hayami; Minori Terada	Nikkatsu
1986
February 1986	S&M Hunter	Shūji Kataoka	Shirō Shimomoto; Hiromi Saotome; Yutaka Ikejima	Shintōhō Eiga
May 31, 1986	Entrails of a Virgin	Kazuo Komizu	Saiko Kizuki; Naomi Hagio	Nikkatsu; Rokugatsu
June 1986	Sexy Battle Girls	Mototsugu Watanabe	Kyōko Hashimoto; Yukijiro Hotaru; Yutaka Ikejima	Shintōhō Eiga
December 20, 1986	Time Escapade: 5 Seconds Til Climax	Yōjirō Takita	Kozue Tanaka	Nikkatsu
1987
April 18, 1987	Lesbian Harem	Tomoaki Hosoyama	Reika Kano; Yuriko Kyōtoku	Shintōhō Eiga
August 8, 1987	Itoshino Half Moon	Yōjirō Takita	Maiko Itō	Nikkatsu

== 1990s ==
Release date	Title	Director	Cast	Studio(s)
1990
February 1990	Serial Rape: Perverted Experiment	Hisayasu Satō	Rokuzō; Asuka Morimura	Shishi Productions; Xces Films
May 1990	Horse and Woman and Dog	Hisayasu Satō	Kanako Kishi	Media Top; Shintōhō Eiga
1991
April 26, 1991	Widow's Perverted Hell	Hisayasu Satō	Yuri Hime; Shōichiro Sakata; Kiyomi Itō; Yutaka Ikejima	Shishi Productions; Xces Films
1991
1993
November 26, 1993	Molester's Train: Nasty Behavior	Hisayasu Satō	Yumika Hayashi; Kiyomi Itō	Kokuei; Shintōhō Eiga
1994
March 4, 1994	Keep on Masturbating: Non-Stop Pleasure	Toshiya Ueno	Takeshi Itō; Hitomi Aikawa	Kokuei
April 19, 1994	I Like You, I Like You Very Much	Hiroyuki Oki	Chano	ENK
1995
February 10, 1995	Blissful Genuine Sex: Penetration!	Toshiki Satō	Hotaru Hazuki	Kokuei; Shintōhō Eiga
1996
July 5, 1996	Adultery Diary: One More Time While I'm Still Wet	Toshiki Satō	Hotaru Hazuki	Kokuei; Shintōhō Eiga
November 22, 1996	The Wart	Shinji Imaoka	Yōta Kawase; Maako Mizuno	Kokuei; Shintōhō Eiga
1997
January 3, 1997	I Thought About You	Yukio Kitazawa	Yōta Kawase	Iizumi Productions; ENK
1998
1999
February 26, 1999	Office Lady Love Juice	Yūji Tajiri	Azumi Kubota; Mikio Satō; Yumika Hayashi	Kokuei; Shintōhō Eiga
April 23, 1999	Anarchy in Japansuke	Takahisa Zeze	Kazuhiro Sano; Yumeka Sasaki	Kokuei; Shintōhō Eiga
October 29, 1999	Sopping Wet Married Teacher: Doing It in Uniform a.k.a. Despite All That	Shinji Imaoka	Mitsuyo Suwa; Atsuko Suzuki	Kokuei; Shintōhō Eiga

== 2000s ==
Release date	Title	Director	Cast	Studio(s)
2000
2001
May 4, 2001	I.K.U.	Shu Lea Cheang		Uplink Co.
June 1, 2001	Apartment Wife: Moans from Next Door	Toshiki Satō		Kokuei; Shintōhō Eiga
September 28, 2001	Mourning Wife	Daisuke Gotō		Shintōhō Eiga
2002
July 1, 2002	A Saloon Wet with Beautiful Women	Tatsurō Kashihara		OP Eiga
2003
March 7, 2003	Married Women Who Want a Taste	Hideo Jōjō		Iizumi Productions; Xces
April 8, 2003	A Lonely Cow Weeps at Dawn	Daisuke Gotō		Shintōhō Eiga
October 10, 2003	Irresistable Angel: Suck It All Up	Minoru Kunizawa	Ruri Tachibana	Freak Out; OP Eiga
October 14, 2003	The Glamorous Life of Sachiko Hanai	Mitsuru Meike	Emi Kuroda	Shintōhō Eiga
December 9, 2003	Ambiguous	Toshiya Ueno		
2004
March 9, 2004	Lunch Box	Shinji Imaoka	Yumika Hayashi	Kokuei
July 27, 2004	Tsumugi	Hidekazu Takahara		Shintōhō Eiga
2005
February 25, 2005	Hard Lesbian: Quick and Deep	Osamu Satō		Shintōhō Eiga
June 10, 2005	Frog Song	Shinji Imaoka	Konatsu; Rinako Hirasawa	Kokuei; Shintōhō Eiga
2006
May 1, 2006	Naked Continent	Sakkun		Natural High; Soft On Demand; Adult Video
May 4, 2006	500 Person Sex	Yukitsugu Tsuchiya		SOD Create; Soft On Demand; AV
May 12, 2006	Uncle's Paradise	Shinji Imaoka	Shirō Shimomoto; Minami Aoyama	Kokuei; Shintōhō Eiga
2007
2007	Kage no Hikari	Vincent Guilbert	Maki Tomoda; Tohjiro	French/Japanese documentary on AV actress Maki Tomoda
2008
March 28, 2008	Nakagawa Jun Kyōju no Inbina Hibi	Kunihiko Matsuoka	Rinako Hirasawa; Minami Aoyama	Matsuoka Productions; Xces
2009
January 30, 2009	Maid-Droid	Naoyuki Tomomatsu	Akiho Yoshizawa	Gensō Haikyūsha; Xces
2010
May 15, 2010	Big Tits Zombie	Takao Nakano	Sora Aoi	TMC (Total Media Corporation)
