= Naomi Tani filmography =

Naomi Tani (谷ナオミ, Tani Naomi) is a Japanese pink film actress who is best known for her appearances in Nikkatsu's Roman Porno films with an S&M theme during the 1970s. In the following listing, films are sourced with links to their listings at IMDb ^{(a)}, The Complete Index to World Film^{(b)}, and/or The Japanese Movie Database ^{(c)}.

== 1967 ==
Title	Director	Company	Notes	Release date
Special スペシャル; Supesharu	Kōji Seki	Shin Nihon Eigasha	^{(b)}, ^{(c)}	April 1967
札つき処女; Fudatsuki shojo	Masanao Sakao	Mitsukuni Eiga	^{(a)}, ^{(b)}, ^{(c)}	May 16, 1967
Vicious Doctor (Part 2) aka Madame O 続悪徳医 女医篇; Zoku akutokui: Joi-hen	Seiichi Fukuda	Nippon Cinema	^{(a)}, ^{(b)}, ^{(c)}	May 23, 1967
Slave Widow 奴隷未亡人; Dorei Mibojin	Mamoru Watanabe	Mutsukuni Eiga; Chuo Eiga	^{(a)}, ^{(b)}, ^{(c)}	July 11, 1967
Taste of Women 女の味; Onna no aji	Toshio Okuwaki	World Films	^{(a)}, ^{(b)}, ^{(c)}	July 1967
Three Sins of Sex 性の三悪; Sei No San-aku	Kinya Ogawa	Okura Films	^{(a)}, ^{(b)}, ^{(c)}	August 1, 1967
Fight with a Belly Button おヘソで勝負; Oheso de Shobu	Kōji Seki	Kokuei	^{(a)}, ^{(b)}	August 5, 1967
Carnal Punishment 肉刑; Nikukei	Kiyoshi Komori	Tōkyō Kōei	^{(a)}, ^{(b)}, ^{(c)}	August 5, 1967
Necking ネッキング; Nekkingu	Toshio Okuwaki	World Films	^{(c)}	August 1967
処女のためいき	高木丈夫	寿プロ	^{(c)}	August 1967
Memoirs of a Modern Female Doctor 現代女性医学; Gendai Joi Igaku	Kinya Ogawa	Okura Eiga	Starring Noriko Tatsumi^{(a)}, ^{(b)}^{(c)}	May 1, 1967
Forbidden Garden (lit. College Girl's Forbidden Garden) 女子大生の禁じられた花園; Joshi daisei no kinjirareta hanazono	Kinya Ogawa	Okura Films	^{(c)}	September 2, 1967
Bed of Violent Desires 暴欲の色布団; Boyoku no Shikibuton	Mamoru Watanabe	Watanabe Productions	^{(a)}, ^{(b)}, ^{(c)}	October 13, 1967
Cruel Map of Women's Bodies aka Female Bodies in a Brutal Scenario 女体残虐図; Jotai Zangyakuzu	Masanao Sakao	Ōkura Films	^{(a)}, ^{(b)}, ^{(c)}	October 28, 1967
Ten Years of Evil 悪道庵十年; Akudoma Junen	Mamoru Watanabe; Shinya Yamamoto	Kiei	^{(a)}, ^{(b)}, ^{(c)}	October 1967
惨奇 性体実験)	Kiyoshi Komori	Tōkyō Kōei	^{(c)}	November 21, 1967
Impulsive Behavior of Men and Women めすおすの本能; Mesu-osu no honno	Kinya Ogawa	Okura Films	^{(a)}, ^{(b)}, ^{(c)}	December 1, 1967
Degenerate 変質者; Henshitsusha	Shinya Yamamoto	Wakamatsu Productions	^{(a)}, ^{(b)}, ^{(c)}	December 5, 1967
Bed Dance ベッドダンス	Toshio Okuwaki	World Eiga	^{(a)}, ^{(b)}	1967
Impulsive Behavior of Men and Women; Mesu Osu no Mesu-osu				1967
Memoirs of Modern Love: Curious Age 現代愛の事典 知りたい年頃; Gendai Ai no Jiten: Shiritai Toshigoro	Shinya Yamamoto	Watanabe Productions; Tōkyō Kōei	^{(b)}, ^{(c)}	1967
Skillful in Bed 寝上手; Nehozu	Shinya Yamamoto	Shintōhō Eiga	^{(c)}	1967
Experiments on the Human Body; Zanki: Seitaijikken	Kiyoshi Komori	Tōkyō Kōei	^{(b)}	1967
Vicious Doctor; Akutokui	Seiichi Fukuda	World Eiga	^{(b)}	1967
夜の千人斬	東元薫	日映企画	^{(c)}	1967

== 1968 ==
Title	Director	Company	Notes	Release date
色道仁義	三樹英樹	Yamabe Productions	^{(c)}	March 1968
Absolutely Secret: Girl Torture 極秘 女拷問; Gokuhi Onna Gomon	Kiyoshi Komori	Shintōhō Eiga; Tokyo Koei	^{(a)}, ^{(b)}, ^{(c)}	April 1968
Joys of Torture: Tokugawa History Women Punishment 徳川女系図; Tokugawa Onna Keizu	Teruo Ishii	Toei	^{(a)}, ^{(b)}, ^{(c)}	May 1, 1968
Woman's Sex Drive 女の色欲; Onna no Shikiyoku	Hideki Miki	Okura Eiga; Yamabe Productions	^{(a)}, ^{(b)}, ^{(c)}	May 1968
Season for Rapists 痴漢の季節; Chikan no Kisetsu	Shinya Yamamoto	Tokyo Koei; Shintōhō Eiga	^{(a)},^{(b)}, ^{(c)}	June 1968
Search for a True Virgin 純処女しらべ; Jun Shojo Shirabe	Kinya Ogawa	Okura Films	^{(a)}, ^{(b)}, ^{(c)}	June 1968
From Flower and Snake: Training of the Flesh 花と蛇より 肉の飼育; Hana to Hebi yori: Niku no Shiiku	Jiro Matsubara; Shintaro Kishi	Aoi Eiga; Yamabe Productions	^{(a)}, ^{(b)}, ^{(c)}	June 1968
Tokyo Bathhouse 女浮世風呂; Onna Ukiyo Buro	Motomu Ida (Tan Ida)	Aoyama Productions; Nikkatsu	^{(a)}, ^{(b)}	July 10, 1968
Orgy of the Flesh 肉の競艶; Niku no Kyo-en	Jiro Matsubara	Yamabe Productions; Million Film	^{(a)}, ^{(b)}, ^{(c)}	November 1968
Bill for Lust; Aiyoku no Seisansho				1968
Lady Poison Rampage 悪女乱行; Akujo Ranko	Kinya Ogawa	Okura Films	^{(c)}	1968
Sex and Marriage; Seihonno to Kekkon				1968
Whip and the Beast 鞭と陰獣; Muchi to Inju	Jiro Matsubara	Yamabe Productions	^{(c)}	1968
或る色魔	Akitaka Kimata	プロ鷹	^{(c)}	1968
Continued Flower and Snake - Red Torture 続・花と蛇 赤い拷問; Zoku hana to hebi akai gōmon	Jiro Matsubara	Yamabe Productions	^{(c)}	1968
肉体手形	Shintaro Kishi	Yamabe Productions	^{(c)}	1968

== 1969 ==
Title	Director	Company	Notes	Release date
女が満たされる時 魔性妻	三樹英樹	Tani Productions	^{(c)}	January 1969
Flesh Resume 肉体の履歴書; Nikutai no Rirekisho	宮口圭	Yamabe Productions	^{(c)}	March 1969
Pleasure of Flesh; Nikutai no Kanki				1969

== 1971 ==
Title	Director	Company	Notes	Release date
Bed Technique Diary 人生寝わざ日記; Jinsei Mewaza Nikki	Ario Takeda	Mitsukuni Eiga	^{c}	February 1971
Sex Devil 性蝕鬼 (?)Sei Gaki	Ario Takeda	Mitsukuni Eiga	^{c}	June 1971
Finger Mischief 指のいたずら; Yubi no Itazura	Ario Takeda	Mitsukuni Eiga	^{c}	July 1971
Finger Mischief 2: Pressure Point Hell つぼ地獄; Zoku Yubi no Itazura: Tsubo Jigoku	Ario Takeda	Mitsukuni Eiga	^{c}	October 1971
Sex and Greed セックス色と欲; Sex Iro to Yoku	Ario Takeda	Mitsukuni Eiga	^{c}	November 1971
Ripe Female Body 熟した女体; Jukushita Nyota	Ario Takeda	Million Film	^{c}	November 1971
Abnormal Sex Game; Ijo Seigi				1971
Erotic Appraisal; Seiai Kantei				1971

== 1972 ==
Title	Director	Company	Notes	Release date
Bedroom Technique 寝室のテクニック; Shinshitsu no Technique	Ario Takeda	Mitsukuni Eiga	^{c}	January 1972
Special Triangle Affair 特殊三角関係; Tokushu Sankaku Kankei	Shinya Yamamoto	東京興映	^{c}	January 1972
Sensuous Beasts しなやかな獣たち; Shinayakana kemonotachi	Akira Kato	Nikkatsu	^{a, b, c}	February 9, 1972
Stolen Sex; Netorareta Sei				1972
Cruelty: Pink Skin Hell 残酷紅肌地獄; Zankoku: Benihada Jigoku	Ario Takeda	Mitsukuni Eiga	^{c}	June 1972
Tools of Sexual Abuse セックス責め道具; Sex Seme-Dogu	小川卓寛	Mitsukuni Eiga	^{c}	December 1972
Escapade Journal; Seiyu-ki				1972
Sex Killer 性の殺し屋; Sei no Koroshiya	Naomi Tani	Mitsukuni Eiga	^{c}	1972
Starved Sex Beast; Ueta Inju	Naomi Tani			1972

== 1973 ==
Title	Director	Company	Notes	Release date
日本猟奇事件	Kiyoshi Komori; Shinya Yamamoto 堀越善明	東京興映	^{c}	January 1973
Grotesque Portrait of Lust 猟奇 色情絵図; Ryoki Shikijo-Ezu	松原二郎	Mitsukuni Eiga	^{c}	January 1973
Naked Wife: Sexual Confession 裸妻 性の告白; Hadaka-zuma: Sei no Kokuhaku	松原二郎	Mitsukuni Eiga	^{c}	February 1973
Knife for Cooking Love; Iro-bocho				
Perfect Sex Crime; Sei no Kanzen Hanzai				
Underpanty Strategy パンティ大作戦; Panty Daisakusen	久我剛	Mitsukuni Eiga	^{c}	July 1973
Drifting Bliss さすらいの悶え; Sasurai no Modae	秋津隆二	Mitsukuni Eiga	^{c}	August 1973
Female Body Pilgrimage 女体めぐり; Nyotai-Meguri	秋津隆二	Million Film	^{c}	August 1973
Sex Pinch 性のピンチ; Sei no Pinch	秋津隆二	Mitsukuni Eiga	^{c}	September 1973
Sex in Adultery 不倫の交情; Furin no Kojo	Mamoru Watanabe	大東映画	^{c}	October 1973
Poaching by Witches 魔女の密漁; Majo no Mitsuryo	Mamoru Watanabe	Okura Films	^{c}	December 1973
Sex Competition: Blonde vs Brunette 金髪黒髪性競淫; Kinpatsu Kurokami Sei-Kyoin	小川卓寛	Okura Films	^{c}	1973

== 1974 ==
Title	Director	Company	Notes	Release date
実録毒婦性絵巻 お伝色ざんげ	Moto Sasaki	Okura Films	^{c}	January 4, 1974
College-Girl: Lost Report 女子大生 性愛図; Joshitaisei Seiai-zu	Mamoru Watanabe	大東映画	^{c}	January 1974
Trap of Ecstasy 恍惚のおとし穴; Koukotsu no Otoshiana	Mamoru Watanabe	大東映画	^{c}	February 1974
Sex Before Breaking Up 別れの性; Wakare no Sei	Mamoru Watanabe	Okura Films	^{c}	March 1974
Flower and Snake 花と蛇; Hana to Hebi	Masaru Konuma	Nikkatsu	^{a}^{b}^{c}	June 22, 1974
Wife to be Sacrificed 生贄夫人; Ikenie Fujin	Masaru Konuma	Nikkatsu	^{a}^{b}^{c}	October 26, 1974

== 1975 ==
Title	Director	Company	Notes	Release date
三人の浮気妻	影山明文	World Films	^{a}^{c}	January 18, 1975
A Haunted Turkish Bathhouse 怪猫トルコ風呂; Bakeneko Toruko furo	Kazuhiko Yamaguchi	Toei	^{c}	January 29, 1975
レスビアンの世界 －恍惚－	Masaru Konuma	Nikkatsu	^{a}^{c}	February 19, 1975
禁断 性愛の詩	Mamoru Watanabe	大東映画	^{c}	March 21, 1975
Cruelty: Black Rose Torture 残酷 黒薔薇私刑; Zankoku: Kurobara Lynch	Katsuhiko Fujii	Nikkatsu	^{b} ^{(c)}	April 26, 1975
Oryu's Passion: Bondage Skin お柳情炎 縛り肌; Oryū jōen: shibari hada	Katsuhiko Fujii	Nikkatsu	^{b} ^{(c)}	June 18, 1975
残酷 女高生（性）私刑	Isao Hayashi	Nikkatsu	^{c}	July 23, 1975
Black Rose Ascending 黒薔薇昇天; Kurobara Shôten	Tatsumi Kumashiro	Nikkatsu	^{c}	August 9, 1975
情炎夜這秘話	Shinya Yamamoto	Shintōhō Eiga	^{c}	October 1975
Newlywed Hell 新妻地獄; Niizuma jigoku	Akira Katō	Nikkatsu	^{c}	December 6, 1975
Wet Lust: Open the Tulip 濡れた欲情 ひらけ！チューリップ; Nureta Tokujo: Hirake! Tulip	Tatsumi Kumashiro	Nikkatsu	^{b} ^{(c)}	December 24, 1975
花の女王蜂性狂乱	Mamoru Watanabe	Okura Films	^{c}	December 27, 1975
おかきぞめ 新・花電車	Mamoru Watanabe	Million Film	^{c}	December 1975
甘い体験 愛人関係; Amai Taiken Aijinkankei	Shinya Yamamoto	Shintōhō Eiga	^{c}	December 1975
Cruelty of the Female Inquisition; Zangyaku Onna Gomon			^{b}	

== 1976 ==
Title	Director	Company	Notes	Release date
残虐女刑史; Zangyaku Onna Kei-shi	Shinya Yamamoto	Shintōhō Eiga	^{c}	January 1976
Rape! 犯す！ Okasu!	Yasuharu Hasebe	Nikkatsu	^{bc}	February 7, 1976
Wet Flower Vase 濡れた壺; Nureta Tsubo	Masaru Konuma	Nikkatsu	^{bc}	March 29, 1976
Slave Wife 奴隷妻; Dorei Zuma	Akira Kato	Nikkatsu	^{bc}	June 12, 1976
残酷縛絵伝奇	Shinya Yamamoto	Shintōhō Eiga	^{c}	August 1976
Tattooed Flower Vase 花芯の刺青 熟れた壺; Kashin no Irezumi: Ureta Tsubo	Masaru Konuma	Nikkatsu	^{c}	September 25, 1976
恍惚にっぽん ポルノ色蒲団	岡本愛	Million Film	^{c}	November 2, 1976
幼な妻 絶叫！！	Shinichi Shiratori	Nikkatsu	^{c}	November 3, 1976
Lady Moonflower 夕顔夫人; Yugao Fujin	Katsuhiko Fujii	Nikkatsu	^{b} ^{(c)}	December 8, 1976

== 1977 ==
Title	Director	Company	Notes	Release date
Painful Bliss! Final Twist 悶絶！！どんでん返し; Monzetsu! Donden Gaeshi	Tatsumi Kumashiro	Nikkatsu	^{a}^{bc}	February 1, 1977
（秘）温泉 岩風呂の情事	Isao Hayashi	Nikkatsu	^{c}	April 9, 1977
In the Realm of Sex 性と愛のコリーダ; Seito Ai no Korida	Masaru Konuma	Nikkatsu	^{bc}	April 23, 1977
Fairy in a Cage 檻の中の妖精; Ori no Naka no Yosei	Kōyū Ohara	Nikkatsu	^{a}^{bc}	June 4, 1977
Female Convict 101: Suck 女囚101 しゃぶる; Joshū 101: Shaburu	Kōyū Ohara	Nikkatsu	^{a}^{c}	August 6, 1977
Fascination: Portrait of a Lady 幻想夫人絵図; Genso Fujin Ezu	Kōyū Ohara	Nikkatsu	^{a}^{bc}	October 1, 1977
谷ナオミ 縛る！	Mamoru Watanabe	Shintōhō Eiga	^{c}	November 1977
Noble Lady: Bound Vase 団鬼六「黒い鬼火」より 貴婦人縛り壺; Kifujin Shibari Tsubo	Masaru Konuma	Nikkatsu	^{a}^{bc}	December 10, 1977

== 1978 ==
Title	Director	Company	Notes	Release date
Lady Black Rose 黒薔薇夫人; Kurobara fujin	Shōgorō Nishimura	Nikkatsu	^{a}^{bc}	April 1, 1978
Rope Hell 縄地獄; Nawa Jigoku	Kōyū Ohara	Nikkatsu	^{a}^{bc}	June 24, 1978
Skin of Roses 団鬼六 薔薇の肉体; Dan Oniroku: Bara no Nikutai	Katsuhiko Fujii	Nikkatsu	^{a}^{bc}	September 9, 1978
Rope Cosmetology 団鬼六 縄化粧; Nawa geshō/Dan Oniroku nawa geshō	Shōgorō Nishimura	Nikkatsu	^{a}^{bc}	December 2, 1978
Woman's Bedroom: Lusty Competition おんなの寝室 好きくらべ; Onna no Shinshitsu: Sukikurabe	Shinichi Shiratori	Nikkatsu	^{a}^{bc}	December 23, 1978

== 1979 ==
Title	Director	Company	Notes	Release date
谷ナオミ 縄肌地獄	Mamoru Watanabe	Shintōhō Eiga	^{c}	May 1979
Rope and Skin 団鬼六 縄と肌; Dan Oniroku Nawa to Hada	Shogoro Nishimura	Nikkatsu	Tani's last film role ^{b}^{c}	July 21, 1979

== 1984 ==
Title	Director	Company	Notes	Release date
Best of SM 団鬼六監修 SM大全集; Dan Oniroku SM Daizenshu	Fumihiko Kato	Nikkatsu	Compilation of excerpts from Oniroku Dan's Nikkatsu films ^{a}^{c}	March 16, 1984

== 2000 ==
Title	Director	Company	Notes	Release date
Sadistic and Masochistic サディスティック＆マゾヒスティック; Sadisutikku & Mazohisutikku	Hideo Nakata	Nikkatsu	Documentary on director Masaru Konuma^{a}^{c} Tani appeared as herself	January 27, 2000

== Sources ==
- Naomi Tani at IMDb
- "NAOMI TANI". The Complete Index to World Film.
- "谷ナオミ (Tani Naomi)" (in Japanese). JMDB.
- Weisser, Thomas; Yuko Mihara Weisser (1998). Japanese Cinema Encyclopedia: The Sex Films. Miami: Vital Books : Asian Cult Cinema Publications. ISBN 1-889288-52-7.
