= Cruelty: Black Rose Torture =

- Theatrical poster for Cruelty: Black Rose Torture (1975)
- Directed by: Katsuhiko Fujii
- Written by: Keiji Kubota; Junichi Ōmura
- Starring: Naomi Tani; Terumi Azuma
- Cinematography: Teruo Hotanaka
- Edited by: Atsushi Nabeshima
- Music by: Kariudo Yamano
- Distributed by: Nikkatsu
- Release date: April 26, 1975
- Running time: 73 min.
- Country: Japan
- Language: Japanese

Cruelty: Black Rose Torture (残酷 黒薔薇私刑, Zankoku: kurobara lynch) aka Black Rose Slave is a 1975 Japanese film in Nikkatsu's Roman porno series, directed by Katsuhiko Fujii and starring Naomi Tani.

== Synopsis ==
In pre-war Japan, Yumiko, an aristocratic lady, accompanied by her maid, travels to Tokyo to visit her brother. Unaware that her brother has become involved in anti-governmental activities and left the city, the two women are captured, raped and tortured by the military police. Two years later, during the war, the government confiscates Yumiko's estate, turning it into a torture chamber for the inquisition of prisoners. Yumiko and her maid are among those who are subjected to sexual indignities.

== Cast ==
- Naomi Tani
- Terumi Azuma
- Hiroshi Gojo
- Hideaki Ezumi
- Akira Takahashi

== Background ==
Since first entering the softcore pornographic genre in 1971, Nikkatsu had been courting the "Queen" of pink film, Naomi Tani to work for them. Because Nikkatsu was reluctant to work in the SM genre, Tani's specialty, and Tani preferred to have starring roles in independent productions rather than supporting roles at Nikkatsu, she refused. When the studio agreed to film Tani's SM projects Flower and Snake and Wife to be Sacrificed (both 1974) and both became major hits, Nikkatsu officially entered the genre, with Tani as their SM Queen. With Cruelty: Black Rose, the studio created the "Black Rose" nickname for Tani, which they would continue to use in film titles starring Tani which otherwise had no connection. Some such titles include Black Rose Ascension (1975), Lady Black Rose (1978).

After Naomi Tani and Terumi Azuma had first worked together in Masaru Konuma's Wife to be Sacrificed (1974), Nikkatsu teamed the two women in several more projects, in which Azuma served in a supporting role to Tani. After Wife to be Sacrificed, Cruelty: Black Rose Torture was the second of these pairings. They were popular together, though they became rivals both on and off-screen. After Azuma began having starring roles of her own in 1976, she stopped appearing with Naomi Tani. The two were linked again in romantic scandal when Tani's manager-boyfriend left her for Azuma in 1977.

Director Katsuhiko Fujii had previously been assigned to sequels in the Apartment Wife and Eros Schedule Book series, without much success. With Cruelty: Black Rose Torture he found the dark style and SM themes which would become his career forte. He was again teamed with Tani and Azuma in their next SM and torture opus, Oryu's Passion: Bondage Skin (1975), and went on to a career as one of Nikkatsu's most highly regarded "Best SM" directors.

== Critical appraisal ==
In their Japanese Cinema Encyclopedia: The Sex Films, the Weissers give the film a three out of four rating, but note, in comparison to Naomi Tani and Terumi Azuma's previous pairing-- Wife to be Sacrificed, "the film isn't as masterful as Masaru Konuma's legendary project". They judge that Fujii was an excellent choice to direct the project, and credit it with his putting his career into the SM genre.

== Bibliography ==
=== English ===
- Sharp, Jasper (2008). Behind the Pink Curtain: The Complete History of Japanese Sex Cinema. Guildford: FAB Press. ISBN 978-1-903254-54-7.
- Weisser, Thomas; Yuko Mihara Weisser (1998). "CRUELTY: BLACK ROSE TORTURE (1975)". Japanese Cinema Encyclopedia: The Sex Films. Miami: Vital Books : Asian Cult Cinema Publications. pp. 96–97. ISBN 1-889288-52-7.
- Zankoku: Kurobara rinchi (1975) at IMDb
- "ZANKOKU KUROBARA LYNCH". Complete Index to World Film.

=== Japanese ===
- 残酷 黒薔薇私刑(1975) (in Japanese). allcinema.net.
- 残酷・黒薔薇私刑 (in Japanese). Japanese Cinema Database (Agency for Cultural Affairs).
- 残酷 黒薔薇私刑 (in Japanese). Japanese Movie Database.
- 残酷・黒薔薇私刑(邦画) (in Japanese). Kinema Junpo. Archived from the original on 2011-10-07.
- 残酷黒薔薇私刑 (in Japanese). www.nikkatsu-romanporno.com. Archived from the original on 2011-07-14.
