= Ran Masaki =

Japanese AV idol, pink film actress and gravure model

- 真咲 乱
- Born: 26 July 1965 (age 60); Japan
- Other name: Yuriko Shimura (TV appearance in 1983)

Ran Masaki (Japanese: 真咲 乱, Hepburn: Masaki Ran) (born July 26, 1965) is a former Japanese AV idol, pink film actress and gravure model who was active in the 1980s and rose to prominence as Nikkatsu's final "SM Queen" (SMの女王, SM no joō) from 1985 to 1986. Masaki starred in three Roman Porno films (two of them written by Oniroku Dan). She also appeared until 1987 in several adult videos mainly focusing on her full-figured body.

Some sources, such as the JMDB, erroneously list her as the same person with Ran Mizukami (水上 乱, Mizukami Ran), a pink film actress of the same period, also known as the fetish model Sawako (佐和子).

== Filmography ==
=== Nikkatsu ===
Title	Release date	Director	Notes
Beautiful Teacher in Torture Hell 団鬼六美教師地獄責め	1985-12-14	Masahito Segawa	co-starring Izumi Shima
Snake and Whip 団鬼六 蛇と鞭	1986-08-23	Shōgorō Nishimura	co-starring Izumi Shima
White Uniform Rope Slave 花と蛇 白衣縄奴隷	1986-12-06	Shōgorō Nishimura	co-starring Minako Ogawa

=== Adult Videos (AV) ===
Title	Release date	Director	Studio	Notes
Hips & Bust Ran! Ran! Ran! バスト・ヒップ 乱・乱・乱	1986-03-25	Toshiyuki Mizutani	Geneisya - Swan Video; SH-426	AV Debut
Ran the Nymphomaniac いん乱な乱	1986-08-10	Daisaku Sato	Geneisya - Swan Video; SH-433	
Ran Masaki: Glamorous Love グラマラス・ラブ 真咲乱			VIP; 2A-001	
Glamorous Love 2: Dangerous Smell 危険な匂い グラマラス・ラブ2			VIP; 2A-022	
Ran Masaki: Perverted 100 Bust 変態バスト100 真咲乱			VCA; TFC-1008	
Ran Masaki: Milk Fuck 乳姦 真咲乱			VCA; TFC-1009	
Ran Masaki Final: Goodbye Miss E 真咲 乱 ファイナル サヨナラＥ嬢	1987		Ponytale Video; F128-P001	
The Big Bust Mania: 4 Movies in One ザ・デカブラマニア4の作品内容について				Compilation
Daddan Busty Series Vol. 4: Scandalous Chest Girlfriends ダッダーン巨乳シリーズＶＯＬ．４ 胸さわぎな友達				Compilation
