= Flower and Snake: Zero =

- Film poster
- Directed by: Hajime Hashimoto
- Written by: Takehiko Minato
- Produced by: Takehiko Shimazu; Hidetomo Sugaya
- Starring: Maiko Amano; Noriko Hamada; Rina Sakuragi; Yuichi Kimura; Kanji Tsuda; Naoki Kawano; Hideo Sakaki; Yuki Tsujimoto; Anri; Daikichi Sugawara
- Cinematography: Naoki Kayano
- Edited by: Yukiko Kobori
- Music by: Shogo Kaida
- Distributed by: Toei Video
- Release date: 17 May 2014
- Running time: 111 minutes
- Country: Japan
- Language: Japanese

Flower and Snake: Zero (花と蛇 ＺＥＲＯ, Hana to hebi: Zero) is a 2014 Japanese erotic drama film directed by Hajime Hashimoto, starring Maiko Amano, Noriko Hamada and Rina Sakuragi and part of a film series based on the novels of Oniroku Dan. It was released on 17 May 2014.

== Plot ==
A police hunt in Tokyo is on for the organizers of the illicit website 'Babylon' that live streams the sexual torture of women rumored to have been kidnapped and forced to perform against their will. During a raid on a 'Babylon' shooting location, detective Misaki Amamiya (Maiko Amano) discovers her estranged sister Hiroki (Naoki Kawano) is involved in the operation but lets her escape, afraid of how her sister's criminality might affect her career trajectory. Later, she confronts her sister who puts her in contact with a mysterious stranger who threatens to expose Misaki's crime if she doesn't comply with his debauched demands, claiming he'll reward her with evidence that will lead her closer to 'Babylon's upper management.

Elsewhere, frustrated housewife Ruri (Rina Sakuragi) suspects her husband's distance might be evidence of infidelity and is exposed to 'Babylon' by an online friend. She is intrigued and then fascinated with the livestreams, eventually experimenting with self-bondage and public exposure, deepening her obsession.

At the latest Babylon filming set, the newest 'star' of the livestreams is middle-aged housewife Shizuko, on a daily basis bound, tortured, and molested by an uncanny and impotent young man named Eddy (Yuuki Tsujimoto), who seems naive to the nature of his job, overseen by the brutal and eccentric taskmaster Kurokawa (Daikichi Sugawara). Despite the brutal conditions of her imprisonment, Shizuko develops an affection for Eddy which develops into a mutual romantic love.

Misaki, complying with weakening reluctance to the demands of the mysterious caller, follows the clues to discovering Shizuko's husband and eventually uncovers that Shizuko, rather than being kidnapped, participated with 'Babylon' to pay off her husband's debts. Working under the assumption that 'Babylon' kills their slaves after they exhaust their novelty, Misaki volunteers herself to be a participant in Shizuko's grand finale stream, of which Ruri has also received an invitation to observe. At the show, Misaki and Shizuko are bound and tortured in front of a live audience and Ruri is called upon as audience participation.

In a spontaneous act of romantic love, Eddy overcomes his impotency and has sex with Shizuko. Kurokawa appears and informs the audience that Eddy is in fact Shizuko's biological son, a product of a gang rape when Shizuko was a teenager that was raised in private to be the expert in kinbaku and sexual torture that he is today. Eddy, horrified by this revelation, castrates himself, while Misaki frees herself from bondage, extracts a gun she had hidden in her vagina, and begins killing her way through the 'Babylon' staff, aiming for the company head. Her mentor and chief-of-police appears to give her back up but she realizes during the firefight that he was the secret caller that had put her through the acts of humiliation and provided the clues for her to find 'Babylon'. The head of 'Babylon' is revealed to have died years ago, Kurokawa maintaining a ruse of his existence, suggesting the true force behind 'Babylon' was in fact the thousands of fans watching anonymously from their homes. Kurokawa dies from wounds received during the gunfight and Eddy dies from blood loss from his severed penis. Shizuko wanders off, traumatized and Misaki appears to shoot her mentor in the head off-screen.

In an epilogue, Shizuko is shown to be pregnant, seemingly with Eddy's child. Misaki, still with the police, gets a call from the mysterious stranger. Ruri continues to patronize 'Babylon', fully deviant.

== Cast ==
- Maiko Amano as Misaki Amamiya
- Noriko Hamada as Shizuko Toyama
- Rina Sakuragi as Ruri
- Yuichi Kimura as Yoshihiko Baba
- Kanji Tsuda as Toyama
- Naoki Kawano as Hiroki
- Hideo Sakaki as Saito
- Yuki Tsujimoto as Eddie
- Anri as Mifuyu
- Daikichi Sugawara as Kurokawa

== Reception ==
On Film Business Asia, Derek Elley gave the film a rating of 5 out of 10.
