= Rope and Skin =

- Theatrical poster for Rope and Skin (1979)
- Directed by: Shōgorō Nishimura
- Written by: Oniroku Dan (original story); Isao Matsumoto (screenplay)
- Produced by: Yoshiki Yūki
- Starring: Naomi Tani
- Cinematography: Yoshihiro Yamazaki
- Edited by: Toyoharu Nishimura
- Music by: Hajime Kaburagi
- Distributed by: Nikkatsu
- Release date: July 21, 1979
- Running time: 70 minutes
- Country: Japan
- Language: Japanese

Rope and Skin (団鬼六 縄と肌, Dan Oniroku nawa to hada) is a 1979 Japanese film in Nikkatsu's Roman Porno series, directed by Shōgorō Nishimura and starring Naomi Tani.

== Synopsis ==
Okoma is a female yakuza and gambler who returns to her hometown after a two-year absence. She finds that her old boss has been killed and a rival gang is taking over her own gang's territory. Okoma forms her own gang to seek vengeance. The rival gang captures and tortures her, but she escapes. In the ensuing gang war, the rival gang, and most of her old gang are wiped out. Okoma leaves again, alone in her victory.

== Cast ==
- Naomi Tani as Okoma
- Tatsuya Hamaguchi
- Hitoshi Takagi
- Shōhei Yamamoto
- Yuri Yamashina
- Junko Miyashita
- Ren Seidō

== Background ==
Rope and Skin was "Nikkatsu Queen" Naomi Tani's last film. Her retirement, while still at the top of her popularity, came as a surprise to her audience. When Nikkatsu first started its Roman Porno series in November 1971, the films alternated between contemporary stories, and period dramas. As the series progressed into the later 1970s, budgets were lower, and the films began to use almost exclusively contemporary settings. Because Rope and Skin was to be "Queen" Naomi Tani's farewell project, a higher budget was allotted to this historical period film. In a 1998 interview, Tani explained the reason behind her decision to quit acting after Rope and Skin. "I recognized that it had become difficult to control my body shape, to keep my skin in perfect condition. So rather than disappoint my fans, I retired. I want to exist in the audience's memory as a 'forever blooming flower.'"

The famous Toei yakuza-film screenwriter Isao Matsumoto wrote the script based on a story by Tani's frequent collaborator, the SM-author Oniroku Dan. Many critics have commented on Rope and Skin's similarity to the Toei style, and Tani's character to the lead character of the Red Peony series. In their Japanese Cinema Encyclopedia: The Sex Films, the Weissers give Rope and Skin a rating of three and a half points out of four.

== Availability ==
Rope and Skin was released theatrically in Japan on July 21, 1979. It was released on VHS in Japan on November 9, 1990, and re-released June 10, 1994. In the DVD format, it was released on September 9, 1999, and re-released on June 22, 2007, as part of Geneon's eighth wave of Nikkatsu Roman Porno series.

== Bibliography ==
=== English ===
- "DAN ONIROKU NAWA TO HADA". Complete Index to World Film.
- Dan Oniroku nawa to hada (1979) at IMDb
- Sharp, Jasper (2008). Behind the Pink Curtain: The Complete History of Japanese Sex Cinema. Guildford: FAB Press. ISBN 978-1-903254-54-7.
- Weisser, Thomas; Yuko Mihara Weisser (1998). Japanese Cinema Encyclopedia: The Sex Films. Miami: Vital Books : Asian Cult Cinema Publications. ISBN 1-889288-52-7.

=== Japanese ===
- 団鬼六 縄と肌(1979) (in Japanese). allcinema.net.
- 団鬼六 縄と肌 (in Japanese). Japanese Cinema Database (Agency for Cultural Affairs).
- 団鬼六 縄と肌 (in Japanese). Japanese Movie Database.
- 団鬼六 縄と肌(邦画) (in Japanese). Kinema Junpo.
- 団鬼六・縄と肌 (in Japanese). www.nikkatsu-romanporno.com.
