= Virgin Rope Makeover =

- Theatrical release poster
- Directed by: Mamoru Watanabe
- Written by: Mamoru Watanabe; Banmei Takahashi
- Starring: Mayuko Hino; Naomi Oka
- Cinematography: Shirō Suzuki
- Edited by: Shōji Sakai
- Music by: Ahiru Tobenai
- Distributed by: Shintōhō Eiga
- Release date: June 1, 1979 (Japan)
- Running time: 60 minutes
- Country: Japan
- Language: Japanese

Virgin Rope Makeover (Japanese: 少女縄化粧, Hepburn: Shōjo nawa geshō) is a 1979 Japanese pink film directed by Mamoru Watanabe and starring Mayuko Hino and Naomi Oka.

== Plot ==
In this Meiji period erotic costume drama, Shino has seen her step-mother Aya take over the family inheritance and invite her petty criminal lover into the family home after the death of her father. Shino leaves to go on the traditional temple pilgrimage around the island of Shikoku. During her pilgrimage, she is assaulted several times by bandits but eventually returns home disguised as a geisha to take her revenge.

== Cast ==
- Mayuko Hino (日野繭子) as Shino
- Naomi Oka (岡尚美) as Aya
- Masayoshi Nogami (野上正義)
- Shirō Shimomoto
- Kōji Kokonoe (九重京司)
- Nobuko Nakahara (中原信子)

== Production ==
Director Mamoru Watanabe made his debut with the now lost film Hussy in 1965. Virgin Rope Makeover is a remake of that film. Watanabe also made other films at this time working with actresses Mayuko Hino and Naomi Oka with Oka usually playing the mature woman luring the innocent Hino into sadistic adventures. He also continued to collaborate with screenwriter Banmei Takahashi in other pink films for Shintōhō Eiga.

== Reception ==
Virgin Rope Makeover was awarded the Best Film award at the first Zoom-Up Awards given by the magazine of the same name in 1980. Watanabe took the prize for Best Director and Mayuko Hino won for Best Actress.

== Release ==
Virgin Rope Makeover was released theatrically in Japan in June 1979. It was re-released on VHS tape by Tairiku Shobo (陸書房) in January 1990.
