= Absolutely Secret: Girl Torture =

- Theatrical poster
- Directed by: Kiyoshi Komori aka Haku Komori
- Starring: Naomi Tani
- Distributed by: Tokyo Kōei / Shintōhō Eiga
- Release date: April 1968
- Running time: 80 minutes
- Country: Japan
- Language: Japanese

Absolutely Secret: Girl Torture (極秘 女拷問, Gokuhi: onna gōmon) aka Top Secrets of Women Torture and Top Secret of Torturing Women is a 1968 Japanese pink film in the ero guro style directed by Kiyoshi Komori aka Haku Komori. The film features future Nikkatsu SM-queen Naomi Tani in a role during the first half of her career, working outside of the large studio system.

== Synopsis ==
Set in the Edo period, the film opens with a group of women being convicted of various crimes. The rest of the film is given to graphic depiction of the tortures the women endure as part of their sentences.

== Cast ==
- Koji Satomi
- Naomi Tani
- Kemi Ichiboshi
- Reiko Ōzuki (大月麗子)
- Midori Hinoki (檜みどり)
- 瀬黒 ユリ
- Kaoru Miya (美矢 かほる)

== Production ==
Born about 1920, Kiyoshi Komori began directing in 1953, and concentrated on war films and comedies during the first decade of his career. He made his first pink film—Japan Torture Punishment History—in 1964, and used torture as a central theme in his pink oeuvre from that point on. Absolutely Secret: Girl Torture, along with Snake Lust (1967) is one of Komori's most notorious works. He retired from filmmaking in the mid-1970s.

== Reception ==
In their Japanese Cinema Encyclopedia: The Sex Films, the Weissers assert that the film was inspired by ero guro master, Teruo Ishii's Joys of Torture series. However the first entry in that series, Joys of Torture: Tokugawa History Women Punishment, opened in May 1968, the month after the premier of Absolutely Secret: Girl Torture. Of the film, the Weissers write, "This motion picture is sado-exploitation at its worst (best?)... long before Nikkatsu made it hip." They judge Komori's pink thriller Ten Years Of Evil to be a better film, and note, comparing Komori to two more prominent directors of the genre, "... don't expect the intricate plots usually associated with the similar Ishii productions, nor the exquisite cinematography of the Wakamatsu films."
