= Lady Moonflower =

- Theatrical poster for Lady Moonflower (1976)
- Directed by: Katsuhiko Fujii
- Written by: Oniroku Dan
- Starring: Naomi Tani
- Cinematography: Onozumasa Mizuno
- Edited by: Akira Suzuki
- Music by: Hajime Kaburagi
- Distributed by: Nikkatsu
- Release date: December 8, 1976
- Running time: 70 min.
- Country: Japan
- Language: Japanese

Lady Moonflower (夕顔夫人, Yūgao Fujin), a.k.a. Flower of the Night, is a 1976 Japanese film in Nikkatsu's Roman porno series, directed by Katsuhiko Fujii and starring Naomi Tani.

== Synopsis ==
Kizaki kidnaps Yuriko and engages in a rape and torture session with her, which he photographs. With the photos, he blackmails aristocratic flower arrangement teacher Yumeji, Yuriko's older sister. Rather than allow him to shame her clan by sending the photos to the media, Yumeji goes to Kizaki. Kizaki then proceeds to rape and torture Yumeji, who was his true desire all along. Yumeji escapes from Kizaki at the end of the film.

== Cast ==
- Naomi Tani
- Erina Miyai
- Osamu Tsuruoka
- Tokuko Watanabe
- Shinsho Nakamaru
- Tamaki Katsura

== Background ==
Director Katsuhiko Fujii had been a competent director at Nikkatsu, making lower-profile sequels in the Apartment Wife and Eros Schedule Book series until his talent for SM showed through in the Naomi Tani project, Cruelty: Black Rose Torture (1975). In Lady Moonflower he teamed up with Tani again, with a script by her long-time collaborator, SM-author Oniroku Dan. Kōyū Ohara would direct a more successful variation on the story of Lady Moonflower, also scripted by Dan and starring Tani, in Fairy in a Cage (1977), which is regarded as one of the best of Nikkatsu's forays into the SM-themed pink film.

== Bibliography ==
=== English ===
- Sharp, Jasper (2008). Behind the Pink Curtain: The Complete History of Japanese Sex Cinema. Guildford: FAB Press. ISBN 978-1-903254-54-7.
- Weisser, Thomas; Yuko Mihara Weisser (1998). Japanese Cinema Encyclopedia: The Sex Films. Miami: Vital Books : Asian Cult Cinema Publications. ISBN 1-889288-52-7.
- Yugao fujin (1976) at IMDb
- "YUGAO FUJIN". Complete Index to World Film.

=== Japanese ===
- 団鬼六 夕顔夫人(1976) (in Japanese). allcinema.net.
- 夕顔夫人 (in Japanese). Japanese Cinema Database (Agency for Cultural Affairs).
- 夕顔夫人 (in Japanese). Japanese Movie Database.
- 夕顔夫人(邦画) (in Japanese). Kinema Junpo. Archived from the original on 2011-10-07.
- 団鬼六・夕顔夫人 (in Japanese). www.nikkatsu-romanporno.com. Archived from the original on 2011-07-14.
