= Kage no Hikari =

- Directed by: Vincent Guilbert
- Produced by: Aokarasu
- Starring: Maki Tomoda; Akira Naka; Tohjiro (interviewer)
- Music by: Tamaru; Installing
- Release date: 2007
- Running time: 47 minutes
- Countries: France; Japan
- Language: Japanese

Kage no Hikari (影の光) (roughly translated as "Light of Shadow") (2006) is a French/Japanese documentary directed by Vincent Guilbert, about the Japanese AV actress Maki Tomoda. It was screened at the Neofest on July 28, 2007, in Tokyo, Japan. The interviewer for the film is Tohjiro, who often directed Tomoda in her videos for the Dogma studio. Also appearing in the film is the famous kinbakushi artist Akira Naka (奈加あきら). Music was provided by Tamaru and Installing.

The film was released on DVD-R February 20, 2010, by Taco Che in Tokyo.

== Film content ==
Kage no Hikari (a romanization of the original Japanese title 影の光) is a 47-minute documentary, which focuses on the Japanese adult video (AV) actress Maki Tomoda, who started her career at the age of 30. She expresses her thoughts about her private and professional life before and since she entered the AV industry, delicately sketching the portrait of a woman in her thirties.
