= 500 Person Sex =

2006 Japanese adult video

- Cover to the DVD
- Directed by: Yukitsugu Tsuchiya
- Release date: May 4, 2006
- Running time: 130 minutes
- Country: Japan
- Language: Japanese

500 Person Sex (500人SEX), also known as A Milestone in History!! 500 Person Sex!! (人類史上初!! 500人SEX!!) is a Japanese adult video produced by SOD Create, a division of Soft On Demand (SOD), a large group of media companies.

500 Person Sex was released on May 4, 2006 and features 500 people having sex in the same room. The 130 minute video which has been dubbed the "Biggest group sex orgy video" was directed by Yukitsugu Tsuchiya (土屋幸嗣).

Despite the "orgy" label, the 250 couples featured in the video have sex only with each other and not with any other couple. The couples, who are described by SOD as "students", enter a large studio set up in a warehouse and spend the next two hours in a variety of sexual acts including foreplay, mutual masturbation, oral sex and intercourse. The unique aspect of the production is that each couple performs all the sex acts in a choreographed manner in synchronization with all the other couples. Viewing the massed couples in action, one reviewer had reminiscences of the CGI scenes in The Lord of the Rings movies while another was reminded of March of the Penguins.

500 Person Sex was the SOD Create entry (with the production code OPEN-0604) in the 2006 AV Open contest where it received a Special Jury Award.
