= Memoirs of Modern Love: Curious Age =

- Theatrical poster for Memoirs of Modern Love: Curious Age (1967)
- Directed by: Shin'ya Yamamoto (山本晋也)
- Starring: Naomi Tani; Yumiko Matsumoto; Miki Hayashi
- Production company: Watanabe Pro
- Distributed by: Tōkyō Kōei
- Release date: 1967
- Country: Japan
- Language: Japanese

Memoirs of Modern Love: Curious Age (現代愛の事典 知りたい年頃, Gendai Ai no Jiten: Shiritai Toshigoro), also known as Contemporary Dictionary of Love: Age of Curiosity, is a 1967 Japanese pink film directed by Shin'ya Yamamoto and featuring Naomi Tani in one of her earliest starring roles.

== Synopsis ==
While an obscene audio tape is played, a young woman has sex. She becomes obsessed with the recording and can only achieve orgasm if she is listening to it. Complications ensue when her boyfriend becomes troubled by the tape and is unable to perform sexually while it is being played.

== Cast ==
- Naomi Tani
- Yumiko Matsumoto
- Miki Hayashi

== Background and critical appraisal ==
Director Shin'ya Yamamoto filmed Memoirs of Modern Love: Curious Age for Mamoru Watanabe's Watanabe Pro and it was released theatrically in Japan by Tōkyō Kōei in 1967. Yamamoto and star Naomi Tani worked together in other early pink films such as Degenerate (変質者, Henshitsusha) (also 1967) and Season For Rapists (痴漢の季節, Chikan no Kisetsu) (1968). They both later worked in Nikkatsu's Roman Porno films, but they did not work together in that series.

In their Japanese Cinema Encyclopedia: The Sex Films, Thomas and Yuko Mihara Weisser give Memoirs of Modern Love: Curious Age a rating of two-and-a-half out of four stars. They note that the plotline is "thin and ludicrous", and only an excuse for Tani to show her "primo body".

== Bibliography ==
- Cowie, Peter, ed. (1977). "Japan". World Filmography 1967. London: Tantivy Press. p. 354. ISBN 0-498-01565-3.
- "GENDAI AI NO JITEN: SHIRITAI TOSHIGORO". Complete Index to World Film.
- Gendai ai no jiten: Shiritai toshigoro (1967) at IMDb
- Weisser, Thomas; Yuko Mihara Weisser (1998). Japanese Cinema Encyclopedia: The Sex Films. Miami: Vital Books : Asian Cult Cinema Publications. p. 270. ISBN 1-889288-52-7.
- 現代愛の事典 知りたい年頃 (in Japanese). Japanese Movie Database.
