= Tattooed Flower Vase =

- Poster to Tattooed Flower Vase (1976)
- Directed by: Masaru Konuma
- Written by: Kiyoharu Matsuoka
- Starring: Naomi Tani; Takako Kitagawa
- Cinematography: Masaru Mori
- Music by: Yasuo Higuchi
- Distributed by: Nikkatsu
- Release date: September 25, 1976 (Japan)
- Running time: 74 minutes
- Country: Japan
- Language: Japanese

Tattooed Flower Vase a.k.a. Mature Vase: Tattooed Vagina (花芯の刺青 熟れた壺, Kashin no irezumi: nureta tsubo) (1976) is a Japanese pink film in the Roman Porno series, starring Naomi Tani, directed by Masaru Konuma and produced by Nikkatsu.

== Synopsis ==
A traffic accident brings together the widow Michiyo and her step daughter Takako with Hideo, the young man who caused the accident. Hideo and Takako start a relationship but Michiyo finds out that Hideo is the son of the man who raped her many years earlier. After this discovery, Michiyo's feelings alternate between guilt and excitement and she secretly spies on the young lovers. As atonement she decides to have her "most sensitive areas" tattooed but the pain brings her pleasure. The denouement has Hideo lusting after Michiyo and raping her as his father had done.

== Cast ==
- Naomi Tani as Michiyo
- Takako Kitagawa as Takako
- Shin Nakamaru as Hideo
- Genshu Hanayagi
- Mami Yuki

== Availability ==
Kino International has announced a region 1 DVD release of Tattooed Flower Vase simultaneously with three other Masaru Konuma Roman Porno films, scheduled for November 6, 2007.

== See also ==
- List of Nikkatsu Roman Porno films

== Sources ==
- "KASHIN NO IREZUMI: URETA TSUBO". Complete Index to World Film.
- Kashin no irezumi: ureta tsubo (1976) at IMDb
- "花芯の刺青 熟れた壺 (Kashin no irezumi: ureta tsubo)" (in Japanese). Japanese Movie Database.
- Weisser, Thomas; Yuko Mihara Weisser (1998). Japanese Cinema Encyclopedia: The Sex Films. Miami: Vital Books : Asian Cult Cinema Publications. p. 269. ISBN 1-889288-52-7.
- Sharp, Jasper (2008). Behind the Pink Curtain: The Complete History of Japanese Sex Cinema. Guildford: FAB Press. pp. 223, 349. ISBN 978-1-903254-54-7.
