= Rope Cosmetology =

- Theatrical poster for Rope Cosmetology (1978)
- Directed by: Shōgorō Nishimura
- Written by: Oniroku Dan (original story); Akio Ido (screenplay)
- Produced by: Yoshiki Yūki
- Starring: Naomi Tani; Aoi Nakajima; Katsu Yamada
- Cinematography: Yonezō Maeda
- Edited by: Toyoharu Nishimura
- Distributed by: Nikkatsu
- Release date: December 2, 1978
- Running time: 67 minutes
- Country: Japan
- Language: Japanese

Rope Cosmetology (団鬼六 縄化粧, Dan Oniroku nawa geshō), a.k.a. Rope Makeover or Oniroku Dan: Rope Makeover, is a 1978 Japanese film in Nikkatsu's Roman Porno series, directed by Shōgorō Nishimura and starring Naomi Tani.

== Synopsis ==
Kanako is a married woman who receives an invitation from Tomoe, a lesbian lover from her past, to attend a showing of artwork by Isaku, Tomoe's husband. Isaku's paintings have an S&M theme which surprises Kanako. Tomoe persuades Kanako to begin going with her to a class in which she is learning how to behave like a proper female dog. Kanako's husband, Eiichirō, is suspicious about her activities. After hiring a private detective and learning about her perverse hobbies, Eiichirō throws Kanako into a landfill. The film ends with Eiichirō apparently taking his dog for a walk. The camera pans down to show that, despite his apparent objections to her lessons, Eiichirō is in fact walking Kanako, who is on all fours on a dog leash.

== Cast ==
- Naomi Tani: Kanako Ishino
- Aoi Nakajima: Tomoe Takita
- Katsu Yamada: Eiichirō Ishino
- Akira Takahashi: Isaku Takita
- Tayori Hinatsu: Takita's assistant

== Background and critical appraisal ==
Lead actress Naomi Tani and director Shōgorō Nishimura had worked together previously in the successful Lady Black Rose (1978). Jasper Sharp uses Rope Cosmetology to help explain Tani's popularity in the pink film genre. Despite her image as a proud, matronly, high-class woman, she was willing, if not eager, to submit to extremes of degradation to make her films memorable. Sharp notes that the highlight of the film, in this respect, is when Tani is covered in butter and raped by a German Shepherd Dog. After delving into the extreme and perverse side of Roman Porno with Rope Cosmetology, director Nishimura returned to his usual, more standard fare with his next film, Forbidden Ordeal (1979).

Allmovie writes of the film, "Well-directed and convincingly played, the film manages to walk the fine line between the nauseating misogyny of Japan's appalling 'turtle girl' films and the outright silliness of American and British 'pony girl' efforts, presenting a reasonable introduction to the oft-misunderstood world of erotic discipline."

== Availability ==
Rope Cosmetology was released theatrically in Japan on December 2, 1978. It was released to home video in VHS format on April 27, 1990, and re-released on September 10, 1993. It was released on DVD in Japan on March 21, 2007, as part of Geneon's seventh wave of Nikkatsu Roman Porno series.

== Bibliography ==
=== English ===
- "DAN ONIROKU NAWAGESHO". Complete Index to World Film.
- Dan Oniroku nawagesho (1978) at IMDb
- Sharp, Jasper (2008). Behind the Pink Curtain: The Complete History of Japanese Sex Cinema. Guildford: FAB Press. ISBN 978-1-903254-54-7.
- Weisser, Thomas; Yuko Mihara Weisser (1998). Japanese Cinema Encyclopedia: The Sex Films. Miami: Vital Books : Asian Cult Cinema Publications. pp. 220, 353. ISBN 1-889288-52-7.

=== Japanese ===
- 団鬼六 縄化粧(1978) (in Japanese). allcinema.net.
- 団鬼六 縄化粧 (in Japanese). Japanese Cinema Database (Agency for Cultural Affairs).
- 団鬼六 縄化粧 (in Japanese). Japanese Movie Database.
- 団鬼六 縄化粧(邦画) (in Japanese). Kinema Junpo.
- 団鬼六・縄化粧 (in Japanese). www.nikkatsu-romanporno.com.
