= Cruel Map of Women's Bodies =

- Theatrical poster
- Directed by: Masanao Sakao
- Starring: Naomi Tani
- Production company: Ōkura Eiga
- Distributed by: Ōkura Eiga
- Release date: October 28, 1967
- Running time: 71 minutes
- Country: Japan
- Language: Japanese

Cruel Map of Women's Bodies (女体残虐図, Nyotai Zangyakuzu) aka Female Bodies in a Brutal Scenario is a 1967 Japanese pink film directed by Masanao Sakao. It is significant for being future "S&M Queen" Naomi Tani's first starring role in a film dealing primarily with S&M.

== Synopsis ==
Yōko is a young woman who is forced into prostitution by a yakuza gang. She repeatedly escapes from the gang, and is repeatedly captured, and repeatedly tortured at length.

== Cast ==
- Naomi Tani as Yōko
- Sachiko Inoue
- Miki Hayashi as Harue
- Jōji Nagaoka as Asada
- Akio Shirakawa as Akagawa
- Sanpei Nawa as Aoki
- Hiroko Fuji

== Production ==
Director Masanao Sakao filmed Cruel Map of Women's Bodies for Ōkura Eiga and it was released theatrically in Japan by that studio on October 28, 1967. Sakao made several films about prostitutes throughout his career. In Virgins With Bad Reputations (1967), he directed Naomi Tani again, as a former prostitute trying to escape her past. Sakao found his greatest success at Nihon Cinema studio with Virgins and Pimp (1968).

== Legacy ==
Actress Naomi Tani, who would become known as the "Queen" of S&M film had her first experience with cinematic S&M theme in director Kin'ya Ogawa's Memoirs Of A Modern Female Doctor (also 1967). However, Cruel Map of Women's Bodies was her first film which fully explored S&M as its central theme.

== Bibliography ==
=== English ===
- Cowie, Peter, ed. (1977). "Japan". World Filmography 1967. London: Tantivy Press. p. 365. ISBN 0-498-01565-3.
- Fentone, Steve (1998). "A Rip of the Flesh: The Japanese 'Pink Film' Cycle: Cruel Map of Women's Bodies". She; Japanese Sinema. 2 (11): 10.
- Jotai zangyakuzo (1968) at IMDb
- "JOTAI ZANGYAKUZU". Complete Index to World Film.
- Weisser, Thomas; Yuko Mihara Weisser (1998). Japanese Cinema Encyclopedia: The Sex Films. Miami: Vital Books : Asian Cult Cinema Publications. p. 139. ISBN 1-889288-52-7.

=== Japanese ===
- 女体残虐図 (in Japanese). Japanese Movie Database.
- 女体残虐図 (in Japanese). Japanese Cinema Database (Agency for Cultural Affairs).
