= Oniroku Dan =

Japanese writer (1931–2011)

Dan Oniroku
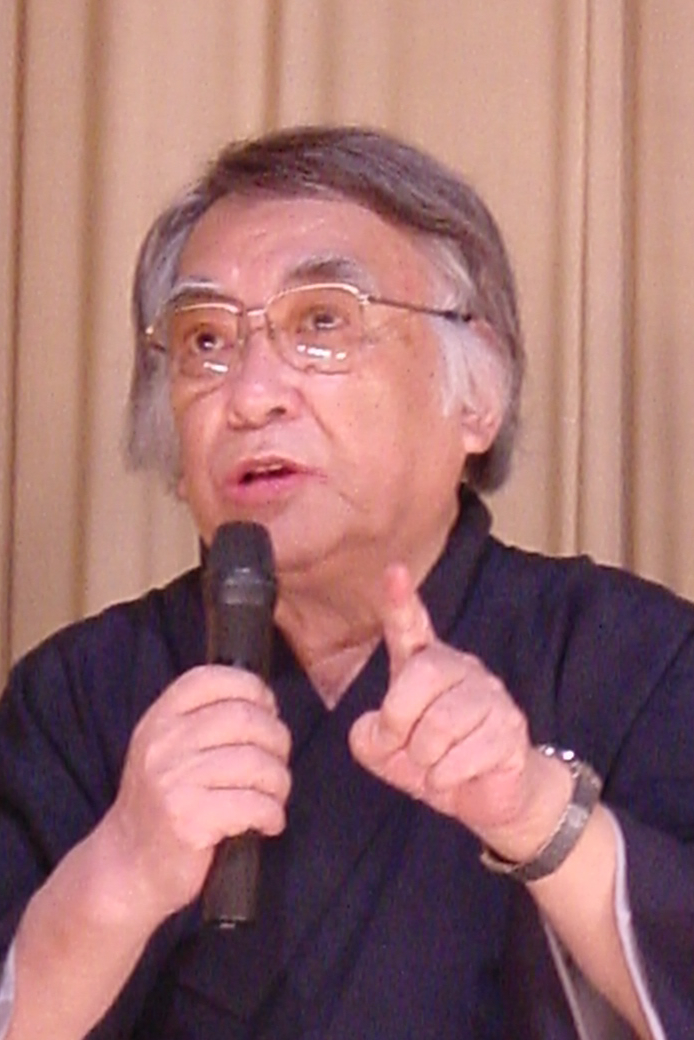
- Born: 16 April 1931
- Died: 6 May 2011 (aged 80)
- Occupations: novelist Screenwriter
- Writing career
- Genre: S&M
- Website: oniroku.net

Oniroku Dan (団 鬼六, Dan Oniroku; 16 April 1931 – 6 May 2011) was a Japanese author who has been called, "the most celebrated writer of popular SM novels in Japan." Many of his stories have been filmed, most notably by Nikkatsu studio in their Roman Porno series. Dan had a close professional association with actress Naomi Tani throughout her career. He died on May 6, 2011.

== Life and career ==
=== Early life ===
Oniroku Dan was born Yukihiko Kuroiwa (黒岩 幸彦, Kuroiwa Yukihiko) in Shiga Prefecture on April 16, 1931. His father, Nobuyuki Kuroiwa, had once aimed to be a screenwriter. His mother, Yukie Katori, was a former movie actress and a former student of the novelist who used the pen name Sanjugo Naoki. This was her second marriage. In 1944 Dan's father was appointed to work in Osaka and the whole family moved to Kansai region. There Dan attended Kwansei Gakuin Middle School, Kwansei Gakuin High School, and graduated from the Department of Law of Kwansei Gakuin University. Dan moved to Tokyo soon after graduation in 1955.

Dan's interest in films was nurtured early in life because his parents owned a movie theater. Dan also claimed to have discovered his interest in S/M very early in life: "I even liked this kind of thing in kindergarten. I remember we had a lovely young teacher in her early twenties. More than anything in the world, I wanted to tie her up."

Growing up during World War II, Dan learned English from American POWs. In the 1950s, he worked as a translator for English-language television programs, including Alfred Hitchcock Presents. In the 1960s, Dan taught English at a junior high school. While teaching he began writing scripts under the pseudonym "Matsugoro Kuroiwa" for Pink films produced by small independent studios. It was during this early stage of his career that Dan's long professional relationship with actress Naomi Tani began.

=== Fame ===
In 1956 Dan won an honorable mention for "Death in Naniwa," which he submitted under the name Matsujiro Kuroiwa (黒岩松次郎) in the All Rookie Cup sponsored by Bungeishunju's "Ooru Yomimono" Magazine. In 1957 he was awarded the runner-up prize for "Oyakodon," which he submitted in the 11th All Rookie Cup sponsored by Bungeishunju's "Ooru Yomimono" Magazine. However, Oniroku Dan's S&M novel Flower and Snake, is the work that made him famous. This novel was first serialized in the S&M magazine Kitan Club under another pseudonym Kyotaro Hanamaki (花巻京太郎) that Dan used during his early career. In addition to a popular film, released in 1974, this novel inspired a series of nine books, and a new series of Nikkatsu Roman porno films released between 1985 and 1987. In 1974, after years of negotiations, Nikkatsu finally succeeded in recruiting Tani for their Roman porno series by agreeing to her request that her first film be based on Dan's Flower and Snake. Dan and Tani had objected to departures from Dan's story made in the film's script by director Masaru Konuma and script-writer Yozo Tanaka. The film, Flower and Snake, became a major hit for the studio and is credited both with starting the highly successful S/M genre of Nikkatsu's Roman porno films, and with establishing Naomi Tani as the third of Nikkatsu's Roman Porno Queens and the first "S/M Queen."

Still offended by the changes in his story for Flower and Snake, Dan refused to participate in the follow-up to that film, Wife to be Sacrificed. In interviews, Dan claimed that this second film, which proved even more successful than Flower and Snake, was based on a story he had written, but that he had insisted his name be removed from the credits. Director Masaru Konuma, however, says that it was an original story by Yozo Tanaka.

Nevertheless, Dan and Nikkatsu were able to settle their differences, and Dan later gave the studio exclusive rights to his novels, many of which were filmed with Naomi Tani. Dan's association with Nikkatsu continued for more than ten years, even after Tani's retirement from the screen. Though the films were sometimes criticized for their predictability, the formulaic structure he developed for most of his film scripts became the model for Nikkatsu's successful and long-lived S/M Roman porno series.

Flower and Snake and other Dan's works published in various S&M magazines, such as Kitan Club, Fuzoku Club, Uramado, and Abu Hunter, were made available to a large public. Moreover, he influenced many subsequent writers who took up the theme of sadomasochism later, such as Murakami Ryu, for example. Thus, although Dan Oniroku's works are generally not considered a high-brow literature but a soft pornography, his influence on certain works of Japanese popular fiction and film industry is considerable. Moreover, Dan not only contributed to the Japanese pink film industry but also to the S&M publications, as he established another S&M magazine, SM King in 1972 (active till 1974).

=== Retirement and comeback ===
In the early 1990s, having by then written over two hundred S/M novels, Dan ceased writing and embarked on an ultimately unsuccessful business venture. After a break of nearly ten years, he returned to writing, publishing his autobiography, The Flower Must Be Crimson: The World of Oniroku Dan. Soon after he came out of retirement, his popularity was such that he was involved in eight serialized magazine novels and the writing of another book.

=== In English ===
Four of Dan's stories, originally published in Japanese in 1997, were published in English in 2010 by Vertical, Inc. The collection of these stories is titled Season of Infidelity; the collection's last story, Bewitching Bloom, is a telling of Dan's relationship with Naomi Tani, and also includes notes about three subsequent Nikkatsu "Queens"; Junko Mabuki, Izumi Shima, and Miki Takakura.

== Critique of style ==
Oniroku Dan was married, with children, and Nicholas Bornoff describes him as a "man with a genuine aura of rather tweedy, comfortable professorship." Dan developed his own variation on S&M, but when asked if he ever acted on his S&M and bondage fantasies with his wife, Dan replied, "No way! She would beat my ass."

Director Masaru Konuma calls his own early S/M films "European-type S/M," and says, "Later S/M developed in a very Japanese fashion. The Oniroku Dan way." Konuma says that Dan described three purposes of S/M: "for punishment, for confinement and for a sense of shame," and that "Oniroku Dan dislikes S&M as punishment... his novels and screenplays are centered around the 'humiliation' concept." Dan confirmed Konuma's view by observing, "My book editors often confuse S/M with cruelty and they want me to write some 'punishment tale' for them. This type of story is out of my realm. It just gives me the creeps. Rather, my concept of S/M is 'distorted sexual desire' or extreme disorientation. It's a male fantasy derived from love... from seeing a beauty suffer through the sense of shame. Therefore, my style contains a romantic, aesthetic, and sometimes decadent fragrance." Konuma says of Dan's female characters, "In his novels, he's searching for the beauty of women. He creates an ideal woman and proceeds to sell an S/M 'fantasy' to his readers."

According to Naomi Tani, Dan's perfect film actress must "look good in a kimono; she needs to have long jet-black hair; she must have a certain amount of body fat, so that the bondage rope makes a clear impression on her skin; and she has to be graceful under torture, with strong facial expressions." Dan said that Naomi Tani fit all these conditions, and that he used her as the model for several of the women in his novels. Commenting on Tani's sudden retirement at the height of her popularity in 1979, Dan said, "I went into shock. It was the end of the Golden Duo. I almost decided to quit writing."

In summing up Dan's work, Bornoff comments, "Dan has the knack of making sadism respectable." Commenting on the growing cult popularity of his Nikkatsu Roman porno films in the United States, Dan acknowledged the differing ways of cultural and artistic expression between the two countries, and said: "I understand some aspects of the pink film are not acceptable in America. But ultimately, if the American people recognize the special quality [of] Oniroku Dan's world through his sex films - then I am more than happy."

== Partial filmography ==
- Flower and Snake (Hana to hebi) director: Masaru Konuma; starring: Naomi Tani (1974)
- Oryu's Passion: Bondage Skin (Oryū jōen: shibari hada) director: Katsuhiko Fujii; starring: Naomi Tani (1975)
- Lady Moonflower (Yugao fujin) a.k.a. Flower of the Night director: Katsuhiko Fujii; starring: Naomi Tani (1976)
- Fairy in a Cage (Ori no naka no yose) director: Kōyū Ohara; starring: Naomi Tani (1977)
- Fascination: Portrait of a Lady (Gensō fujin ezu) director: Kōyū Ohara; starring: Naomi Tani (1977)
- Skin of Roses (Dan Oniroku Bara No Nikutai) director: Katsuhiko Fujii; starring: Naomi Tani (1978)
- Rope Hell (Nawa jigoku) director: Kōyū Ohara; starring: Naomi Tani (1978)
- Rope Cosmetology (Dan Oniroku nawa geshō) director: Shōgorō Nishimura; starring: Naomi Tani (1978)
- Lady Black Rose (Kurobara fujin) a.k.a. Madam Black Rose director: Shōgorō Nishimura; starring: Naomi Tani (1978)
- Rope and Skin (Dan Oniroku nawa to hada) director: Shōgorō Nishimura; starring: Naomi Tani (1979)
- Bridal Doll (Dan Oniroku hanayome ningyō) director: Katsuhiko Fujii; starring: Asako Kurayoshi (1979)
- White Uniform in Rope Hell (Dan Oniroku hakui nawa jigoku) director: Shōgorō Nishimura; starring: Junko Mabuki (1980)
- Blazing Bondage Lady (Dan Oniroku joen fujin) a.k.a. Madam Rope Flame director: Katsuhiko Fujii; starring: Junko Mabuki (1980)
- Image of a Bound Girl (Dan Oniroku shōjo shibari ezu) director: Masaru Konuma; starring: Kumiko Hayano (1980)
- Secretary Rope Discipline (Dan Oniroku onna hisho nawa chokyo) director: Hidehiro Ito; starring: Junko Mabuki (1981)
- Office Lady Rope Slave (Dan Oniroku OL nawa dorei) a.k.a. Oniroku Dan's OL Rope Slave director: Katsuhiko Fujii; starring: Junko Mabuki (1981)
- Female Teacher in Rope Hell (Dan Oniroku onna kyōshi nawa jigoku) director: Shōgorō Nishimura; starring: Junko Mabuki (1981)
- Girl and the Wooden Horse Torture (Dan Oniroku shōjo mokuba-zeme) director: Fumihiko Kato; starring: Serina Nishikawa (1982)
- Blue Woman (Dan Oniroku aoi onna) director: Katsuhiko Fujii; starring: Izumi Shima (1982)
- Dark Hair Velvet Soul (Dan Oniroku kurokami nawa fujin) a.k.a. Black Hair Velvet Soul, and Rope Lady Black Hair director: Mamoru Watanabe; starring: Izumi Shima (1982)
- Female Beautician Rope Discipline (Dan Oniroku onna biyoshi nawa shiiku) director: Hidehiro Ito; starring: Junko Mabuki (1982)
- Beauty in Rope Hell (Dan Oniroku bijo bawa jigoku) director: Genji Nakamura; starring: Miki Takakura (1983)
- Beauty Rope Cosmetology (Dan Oniroku bijo nawa geshō) director: Katsuhiko Fujii; starring: Miki Takakura (1983)
- Snake Hole (Dan Oniroku hebi no ana) director: Katsuhiko Fujii; starring: Izumi Shima (1983)
- Best of S&M (SM Daizenshu) a.k.a. Oniroku Dan Presents The Best Of Nikkatsu SM director: Fumihiko Katō; (1984)
- Rope Torture (Dan Oniroku nawazeme) director: Ikuo Sekimoto; starring: Miki Takakura (1984)
- Female Bondage Torture (Dan Oniroku reijō nawazeme) a.k.a. Hanging Lust director: Satoru Kobayashi; starring: Yui Maisaka (1984)
- Double Rope Torture (Dan Oniroku kinbaku manji-zeme) director: Ikuo Sekimoto; starring: Miki Takakura (1985)
- Beautiful Teacher in Torture Hell (Oniroku Dan: bikyoshi jigokuzeme) director: Masahito Segawa; starring: Ran Masaki (1986)
- Snake and Whip (Dan Oniroku hebi to muchi) director: Shogōrō Nishimura; starring: Ran Masaki (1986)
- Wife to be Molested (Dan Oniroku hitozuma naburi) director: Shuji Kataoka; starring: Shihori Nagasaka (1987)
- Sisters to be Sacrificed (Dan Oniroku ikenie shimai) director: Shogoro Nishimura; starring: Minako Ogawa (1987)
- Exotic Mask in Hell (Dan Oniroku yoen nomen jigoku) director: Fumihiko Kato; starring: Yoshimi Kashiwagi (1988)
- The Slave Ship (Dorei-sen) director: Satoshi Kaneda; starring: Kyōko Aizome (2010)
- Flower and Snake: Zero (2014)
