= Oryu's Passion: Bondage Skin =

- Theatrical poster for Oryu's Passion: Bondage Skin (1975)
- Directed by: Katsuhiko Fujii
- Written by: Oniroku Dan (story); Keiji Kubota (screenplay)
- Produced by: Hiromi Higuchi
- Starring: Naomi Tani; Terumi Azuma
- Cinematography: Shōhei Andō
- Edited by: Toyoharu Nishimura
- Music by: Hajime Kaburagi
- Distributed by: Nikkatsu
- Release date: June 18, 1975
- Running time: 76 min.
- Country: Japan
- Language: Japanese

Oryu's Passion: Bondage Skin (お柳情炎 縛り肌, Oryū jōen: shibari hada) is a 1975 Japanese film in Nikkatsu's Roman porno series, directed by Katsuhiko Fujii and starring Naomi Tani and Terumi Azuma.

== Synopsis ==
When the boss of a yakuza clan in 1920s Osaka is assassinated, Oryu, his mistress, vows revenge. Her search for the killer takes her out of the city. The old boss' son proves a poor leader, only interested in Omitsu, his high-class girlfriend. Yajima, the second-in-command, is taking advantage of the situation to accumulate power for himself. Oryu is called back to help stabilize the situation. Yajima kidnaps both Oryu and Omitsu, and subjects them to torture and various forms of sexual humiliations. During the S&M sessions, Oryu learns that Yajima was the killer of the old boss.

== Cast ==
- Naomi Tani - Oryū
- Setsuo Mia - Ginjirō Emoto
- Terumi Azuma - Omitsu
- Morio Kazama - Matsuo
- Akira Takahashi - Tatsuya Yajima
- Toshihiko Oda - Kenji
- Mari Kojima - Momoko
- Tetsusen Nakahira - Saburō
- Keisuke Yukioka - Shigeyoshi Sawai
- Kōji Yashiro - Eizaburō Kawamura
- Mari Yoshikawa - Prostitute
- Yuki Minami - Runaway prostitute

== Critical appraisal ==
Director Katsuhiko Fujii had previously worked with the duo of Naomi Tani and Terumi Azuma in the successful Cruelty: Black Rose Torture (also 1975). In their Japanese Cinema Encyclopedia: The Sex Films, the Weissers compare Oryu's Passion: Bondage Skin to this previous film, writing, that Cruelty: Black Rose Torture "looks like poetry compared to this hodgepodge of impossible coincidences and ridiculous plot tangents." Among the film's many weak points, they particularly complain about the story's poorly realized characters. They judge that Naomi Tani, however, manages to overcome the weak material, writing, "Ms Tani's larger-than-life screen presence is the only reason to watch." Fujii would regain the knack he had demonstrated for the S&M genre in Cruelty: Black Rose Torture, and go on to be regarded as one of Nikkatsu's top S&M directors.

== Availability ==
Oryu's Passion: Bondage Skin was released theatrically in Japan on June 18, 1975. It was released on home video in VHS format on August 16, 1983, and re-released on May 1, 1992, and again on April 18, 1994. On June 2, 2016, Japanese distributor Happinet released the film on Blu-ray.

== Bibliography ==
=== English ===
- "Oryū jōen: shibari hada". Complete Index to World Film.
- Oryū jōen: shibari hada (1975) at IMDb
- Sharp, Jasper (2008). Behind the Pink Curtain: The Complete History of Japanese Sex Cinema. Guildford: FAB Press. ISBN 978-1-903254-54-7.
- Weisser, Thomas; Yuko Mihara Weisser (1998). Japanese Cinema Encyclopedia: The Sex Films. Miami: Vital Books : Asian Cult Cinema Publications. ISBN 1-889288-52-7.

=== Japanese ===
- お柳情炎 縛り肌(1975) (in Japanese). allcinema.net.
- お柳情炎 縛り肌 (in Japanese). Japanese Cinema Database (Agency for Cultural Affairs).
- お柳情炎 縛り肌 (in Japanese). Japanese Movie Database.
- お柳情炎 縛り肌(邦画) (in Japanese). Kinema Junpo. Archived from the original on 2011-10-07.
- お柳情炎縛り肌 (in Japanese). www.nikkatsu-romanporno.com. Archived from the original on 2011-07-22.
