= Masaru Konuma =

Japanese film director (1937–2023)

- Born: December 30, 1937; Otaru, Hokkaidō, Japan
- Died: January 22, 2023 (aged 85)
- Occupation: Film director
- Years active: 1971–2000
- Awards: Special Prize, Yokohama Film Festival for Nagisa (2000); Deutsches Kinderhilfswerk Grand Prix, Berlin International Film Festival for Nagisa (2000)

Masaru Konuma (小沼勝, Konuma Masaru; December 30, 1937 – January 22, 2023) was a Japanese film director known for his Roman Porno films for Nikkatsu during the 1970s.

== Life and career ==
=== Early life ===
Masaru Konuma was born in Otaru, Hokkaidō, on December 30, 1937. Konuma retained no memories of his father who was a teacher. Drafted into the army after the outbreak of World War II in 1941, Konuma's father became ill with tuberculosis within a year of the start of his military service, and returned home where he died.

After the war, Konuma's mother remarried, and Konuma, then 15, was sent away to live in Tokyo. Konuma recalled, "In those days, there was no TV. I had no idea about Tokyo. It was as distant to me as Africa or Alaska is to kids today. I didn't want to go. I cried."

As a way of dealing with his loneliness and homesickness at this time, Konuma began going to the cinema. He majored in film studies in the Art Department of Nihon University. Soon after graduation, in 1961, Konuma went to work at Nikkatsu Studios, about the same time as producer Yuki and directors Kōyū Ohara and Noboru Tanaka. The quartet were known by their individual characters as, "Diligent Yuki, slovenly Ohara, faithful Tanaka, reckless Konuma." Konuma started as a "fifth" assistant director, which meant he was in charge of the clipboard. He endured this low position at the studio in the hope that eventually he would become a director. In his early career, he was the assistant director on such films as Nikkatsu's venture into the kaiju genre, Daikyojū Gappa (1967), which was released in the U.S. as Monster from a Prehistoric Planet. Seijun Suzuki was one of the few directors who impressed Konuma during these early years at Nikkatsu.

=== Roman Porno ===
During the later 1960s, Nikkatsu began losing its audience to TV, and its film production dropped. At this time, assistant directors moved on to TV or non-film work. In order to find a new audience, Nikkatsu president Takashi Itamochi made the decision to put the company's high production values and professional talent entirely into the "pink-film" (softcore pornographic) industry, which had until then been made by independent and low-budget filmmakers like Kōji Wakamatsu. Many of Nikkatsu's staff either did not return to the studio or left, not wanting to make sex films. Konuma had no such reservations, however, later saying, "The pleasure of becoming a director was greater than anything else at that moment... I was just happy to be making movies."

Konuma's first assignment as director was Call of the Pistil in 1971. Two of his most popular films-- Flower and Snake and Wife to Be Sacrificed—were made for Nikkatsu in 1974, both with Naomi Tani. Though it was Konuma who brought Oniroku Dan's work to the mainstream through Flower and Snake, the author was reportedly never happy with Konuma's interpretation of his work or the SM genre. The success of Flower and Snake inspired a Flower and Snake series which ran through the 1970s and returned in the mid-1980s.

In Konuma's nunsploitation film Cloistered Nun: Runa's Confession (1976), half-Japanese pop singer Runa Takamura made her Roman Porno debut. For Lady Karuizawa (1982), Konuma worked with the mainstream 1960s star, Miwa Takada in her first starring role in over a decade. The film was a variation on Lady Chatterley's Lover, with some added political intrigue. Corrida of Sex and Love a.k.a. In The Realm Of Sex (1977) was Nikkatsu's attempt to capitalize on the notoriety surrounding the domestic release of Ōshima's In the Realm of the Senses (1976).

Commenting on his association with the S/M subgenre of Nikkatsu's Roman Pornos, Konuma said, "In general, the roman porn audience wants to see something they can't experience in everyday life. These people get excited about seeing acts which they may - or may not want to do to their wives or mates. Things they would never be able to really do without ending up in jail or divorce. For example, I was often assigned to make movies with rape scenes. I am not a person who could possibly perform rape. I want to see a lady's happy face while having sex... Movies are fantasies. Sometimes they might be ugly, but they're still fantasies. I was the dreamweaver."

In 2000, director Hideo Nakata, who had served his apprenticeship at Nikkatsu under Konuma, made a documentary on his mentor entitled Sadistic and Masochistic. In 2001 Konuma was given an award at the Yokohama Film Festival for his career and his film Nagisa.

== Partial filmography ==
Title	Cast	Release date
Call of the Pistil 花芯の誘い; Kashin No Izanai	Keiko Maki; Hajime Mitamura	1971-12-18
Love Hunter: Hot Skin ラブハンター 熱い肌; Koi no karyudo: atsui hada	Mari Tanaka; Ken Yoshizawa	1972-03-29
Headlights In The Rain 雨のヘッドライト	Mari Tanaka; Shusaku Muto	1972-05-17
Secret Wife 隠し妻; Kakushizuma	Yuko Katagiri; Kiyoshi Yoshida	1972-07-19
Three Wives: Wild Nights 妻三人 狂乱の夜; Tsuma San-nin: Kyoran No Yoru	Akemi Nijo; Hidemi Hara; Mari Tanaka	1972-10-28
Afternoon Affair: Kyoto Holy Tapestry 昼下りの情事 古都曼陀羅; Hirusagari no joji Koto-mandara	Yuri Yamashina; Morio Kazama	1973-04-04
Erotic Journey: Love Affair In Hong Kong 色情旅行 香港慕情; Shikijo Ryoko: Hong Kong Bojo	Setsuko Ogawa; Yuko Katagiri; Junko Miyashita	1973-08-04
Female Teacher: Sweet Life 女教師 甘い生活; Onna Kyoshi: Amai Seikatsu	Ayako Ichikawa; Aoi Nakajima; Nozomi Yasuda	1973-12-05
White Whore 白い娼婦 花芯のたかまり; Kashin No Takamari	Yuri Yamashina; Misa Aoyama; Toru Ohe	1974-03-02
Lost Love: Oil Hell ロスト・ラブ －あぶら地獄－ Lost Love: Abura Jigoku	Akari Uchida; Tetsuo Tomikawa; Kazuko Tajima	1974-05-04
Flower and Snake 花と蛇; Hana to hebi	Naomi Tani; Yasuhiko Ishizu; Nagatoshi Sakamoto	1974-06-22
Wife to Be Sacrificed 生贄夫人; Ikenie fujin	Naomi Tani; Nagatoshi Sakamoto; Terumi Azuma	1974-10-26
Lesbian World: Ecstasy レスビアンの世界 －恍惚－ Lesbian No Sekai: Koukotsu	Mihoko Arikawa; Maki Kawamura; Naomi Oka	1975-02-19
Female Teacher: Boy Hunt 女教師 少年狩り; Onna Kyoshi: Shonen-gari	Maya Hiromi; Akira Takahashi; Kiyoyasu Adachi	1975-06-04
Great Edo: Secret Story Of A Female Doctor In Trouble 大江戸 (秘)おんな医者あらし; Oedo: Maruhi Onna Isha Arashi	Yuko Katagiri; Moeko Ezawa; Junko Miyashita	1975-10-18
Cloistered Nun: Runa's Confession 修道女ルナの告白; Shudojo Runa no kokuhaku	Luna Takamura; Aoi Nakajima; Kumi Taguchi	1976-01-08
Wet Vase a.k.a. Wet Tattooed Vagina 濡れた壺; Nureta tsubo	Naomi Tani; Hirokazu Inoue; Hiroko Fuji	1976-03-19
Getting Raped a.k.a. Raped 犯される; Okasareru	Junko Miyashita; Maki Mizuno; Akira Hanagami	1976-07-31
Tattooed Flower Vase 花芯の刺青 熟れた壺; Kashin no irezumi: ureta tsubo	Naomi Tani	1976-09-25
Erotic Diary of an Office Lady aka Office Lady Lusty Journal: "Ah, There's Something Inside Me!" ＯＬ官能日記 あァ！私の中で; OL kanno nikki: Ah! Watashi no naka de	Asami Ogawa; Morihira Murakuni; Katsuo Yamada	1977-02-22
In The Realm Of Sex 性と愛のコリーダ; Seito ai no corrida	Asami Ogawa; Natsuko Yashiro; Naomi Tani	1977-04-23
夢野久作の少女地獄; Yumeno Kyusaku no shoujo jigoku a.k.a. Kasei no onna	Asami Ogawa	1977-08-20
団鬼六「黒い鬼火」より 貴婦人縛り壺; Kifujin shibari tsubo	Naomi Tani	1977-12-10
Wandering Lovers: Dizziness さすらいの恋人 眩暈 めまい; Sasurai no koibito: memai	Toshiyuki Kitami; Kei Ogawa; Akira Takahashi	1978-03-04
Friday Bedroom 金曜日の寝室; Kinyo-bi no shinshitsu	Reiko Kayama; Yuki Nohira; Hiroshi Unayama	1978-04-29
Sometimes... Like A Prostitute 時には娼婦のように; Toki niha Shoufu no youni	Rei Nakanishi; Eri Kanuma; Erina Miyai	1978-09-23
College Girls On Friday 泉大八の女子大生の金曜日; Izumi Daihachi no joshidaisei no kinyobi	Minako Mizushima; Yumi Fukazawa; Megu Kawashima	1979-03-31
Mr Dilemma Man (Dilemman): Lunatic For Lust Ｍｒ．ジレンマン 色情狂い; Mr- Dilemman: shikijo-garu	Akira Emoto; Yukiko Tachibana; Yuka Asagiri	1979-10-06
Image Of A Bound Girl 団鬼六 少女縛り絵図; Dan Oniroku shoujo shibari ezu	Kumiko Hayano; Hide Ezumi; Yuko Asuka	1980-03-01
Uptown Lady: Days Of Eros 山の手夫人 性愛の日々; Yamanote fujin: seiai no hibi	Izumi Shima; Ryuichi Nagashima; Yoichiro Sanada	1980-05-31
Wife's Sexual Fantasy: Before Husband's Eyes 妻たちの性体験 夫の眼の前で、今・・・ Tsumatachi no seitaiken: otto no me no maede ima	Yuki Kazamatsuri; Hiroshi Unayama; Rika Takahara	1980-10-22
Woman Who Exposes Herself 見せたがる女; Misetagaru onna	Maiko Kazama; Izumi Shima	1981-01-09
Woman Who Is Used あそばれる女; Asobareru onna	Maiko Kazama; Asami Ogawa	1981-06-12
Fallen Angel Gang 悪女群団; Akujo gundan	Yuki Kazamatsuri; Jun Izumi; Eiko Yanami	1981-10-23
Slave Contract 奴隷契約書; Dorei keiyakushu	Nami Matsukawa; Asami Ogawa; Jun Hongo	1982-01-22
Lady Karuizawa 軽井沢夫人; Karuizawa fujin	Miwa Takada; Takayuki Godai; Yumi Yoshikawa	1982-08-06
Rope and Breasts 縄と乳房; Nawa to chibusa	Nami Matsukawa; Izumi Shima	1983-01-07
ブルーレイン大阪	Kiriko Shimizu	1983-01-07
Female Prisoner: Cage 女囚 檻 Joshuu ori	Mina Asami; Nami Matsukawa	1983-09-16
Madam Scandal - Final Scandal: Madam Likes It Hard ファイナル・スキャンダル 奥様はお固いのがお好き; Final scandal: okusama wa okatai no ga osuki	Midori Satsuki; Kaori Okamoto; Takashi Shikauchi; Kate Asabuki	1983-12-23
スチュワーデス・スキャンダル 獣のように抱きしめて; Stewardess scandal: kemono no youni dakishimete	Tomoko Ai	1984-03-16
柔肌色くらべ	Mariko Nishina	1984-12-08
Woman In The Box: Virgin Sacrifice 箱の中の女 処女いけにえ; Hako no naka no onna: shojo ikenie	Reiko Aoi; Saeko Kizuki; Kojiro Kusanagi	1985-09-07
いんこう; Inkou	Kaori Asou	1986-07-26
Bed-In ベッド・イン	Miki Yanagi; Rie Kitahara	1986-12-20
輪舞 ＜りんぶ＞ Rinbu	Kaori Asou	1988-01-09
Woman In The Box 2 a.k.a. Captured For Sex 4 箱の中の女２; Hako no naka no onna II	Ryouta Nakanishi; Shihori Nagasaka; Miyuki Kawamura	1988-02-27
ドラフト		1991-04-01
雀鬼 裏麻雀勝負！ ２０年間無敗の男		1992-12-01
蕾のルチア		1992-12-19
雀鬼２ 白刃を背に		1993-10-22
雀鬼３ 治外法権麻雀		1994-02-25
XX: Beautiful Hunter 雀鬼３ 治外法権麻雀; XX: Utsukushiki karyuudo		1994-08-12
雀鬼４ 麻雀代理戦争		1994-10-21
雀鬼５ 完結篇 ひとりだけの引退試合		1995-02-24
快楽殺人女捜査官 囮 Kairakusatsujin: onna sousakan		1996-06-07
雀鬼外伝 東海道麻雀無宿		1996-09-06
真・雀鬼		1998-11-27
真・雀鬼２ 麻雀無法地帯		1999-08-27
Nagisa なぎさ		2000-06-10
女はバス停で服を着替えた 鹿追映画製作委員会		2003-03-15

== See also ==
- List of Nikkatsu Roman Porno films

== Bibliography ==
- Konuma, Masaru. (1998). Interviewed by Thomas and Yuko Mihara Weisser on November 6, 1998, in Asian Cult Cinema, #22, 1st Quarter, 1999, p. 19-28.
- "小沼勝 (Konuma Masaru)". Japanese Movie Database (in Japanese).
- "Masaru Konuma". Allmovie.
- "MASARU KONUMA". The Complete Index to World Film.
- Masaru Konuma at IMDb
- Masaru Konuma at nytimes.com
