= Mamoru Watanabe =

Japanese film director (1931–2013)

- Born: March 19, 1931; Tokyo, Japan
- Died: December 24, 2013 (aged 82); Tokyo, Japan
- Occupations: Film director Screenwriter; Actor
- Years active: 1965 –
- Website: http://watanabemamoru.com

Mamoru Watanabe (渡辺 護, Watanabe Mamoru; March 19, 1931 – December 24, 2013) was a Japanese film director, screenwriter and actor, known for his work in the pink film genre. Along with directors Genji Nakamura and Banmei Takahashi, Watanabe was known as one of the "Three Pillars of Pink".

== Life and career ==
=== Early life ===
Watanabe was born in Tokyo on March 19, 1931. His father owned a neighborhood movie theater, giving the young Watanabe an early interest in and a familiarity with the cinema. The family lived near the Daito Eiga studios, and Watanabe would go to watch the filming of jidaigeki. Daito was one of the studios that would be joined into the Daiei Motion Picture Company by the government during World War II. Watanabe's older brother, born about 1919, was also a film enthusiast. When he died of tuberculosis in 1941, Watanabe inherited his older brother's large collection of movie memorabilia, including film scripts and magazines.

=== Early career ===
Watanabe entered Waseda University in 1950 majoring in drama and graduated with honors in 1954. Until 1958, he studied acting techniques after graduation, at the Motō Hatta Theatrical Research Center. Beginning in 1960, Watanabe worked as an assistant director and script-writer for dramas and educational programs on television. This career came to an end in 1965, when Watanabe got into a fistfight with director Michiyoshi Doi, resulting in his banning from television.

At this time, he entered the new, booming pink film industry, directing his first film, Hussy (あばずれ, Abazure) for Ōgi Eiga studio in 1965. In his early career, Watanabe worked for Tokyo Geijutsu, a company that had broken off from Shintōhō, and he directed films for several other independent pink film companies, including Koei, Mitsukuni and Million Film.

In discussing the source of the strongest thematic and stylistic influences on early pink film, Watanabe, in a July 2005 interview with Jasper Sharp, pointed not to the official first pink film, Satoru Kobayashi's Flesh Market (1962) but to Shōhei Imamura's The Insect Woman (1963). Watanabe became known for his intricate plotting in the pink genre, as well as for his ability to spot new talent. He gave future pink and Roman Porno star Naomi Tani her first starring role in the film Bed of Violent Desires (暴欲の色布団, Boyoku no shikibuton) (1967). Two decades later, through his Film Workers Production Company, he gave help to the careers of Kazuo "Gaira" Komizu and Kazuhiro Sano, both of whom would become leading pink film-makers of the 1980s and 1990s.

Watanabe collaborated with Seijun Suzuki's screenwriter, Atsushi Yamatoya on Branded to Kill, in several of his early films. Among their collaborations, Secret Hot Sprint Town: Nightly Starfish (1970) is notable for its striking use of color sequences within a predominantly black and white film. The story of itinerant pornographers, Jasper Sharp writes, "The film plays like a pink-tinged hybrid of Ozu's Floating Weeds and Imamura's The Pornographers."

=== 1980s ===
Though his first film, Hussy, is now a lost film, Watanabe remade it as Virgin Rope Makeover in 1979. The remake won Watanabe the Best Director award at the first "Zoom Up" pink film awards ceremony in 1980. Always concerned with raising the quality of pink film, in 1980, he was also awarded Best Director at the first Pink Ribbon ceremony in Osaka.

During the 1980s, Watanabe became regarded as one of the most important directors working in pink film. He began working as a freelance director occasionally at Nikkatsu, making his first film there in 1982. It was at this time that he befriended Kazuo "Gaira" Komizu, who wrote the script to Watanabe's Uniform Virgin Pain (Seifuku shojo no itama, 1982), and Kazuhiro Sano. Writer Oniroku Dan, dissatisfied with some of the directors to whom Nikkatsu gave his scripts, hired Watanabe to direct his self-produced Dark Hair Velvet Soul (Dan Oniroku Kurokami Nawa Fujin, 1982), which became another hit.

Also in 1982, with director Chūsei Sone, Watanabe started the Film Workers Production Company as an outlet for more mainstream projects. His first mainstream film was Cold Blood (連続殺人鬼 冷血) (1984). Watanabe directed over 210 films in his career.

== Partial filmography ==
Title	Release date	Starring	Studio
Slave Widow	July 11, 1967	Noriko Tatsumi	Mutsukuni Eiga / Chuo Eiga
Virgin Rope Makeover	June 1979	Mayuko Hino	Shintōhō Eiga

== Bibliography ==
=== English ===
- Mamoru Watanabe at IMDb
- "MAMORU WATANABE". Complete Index to World Film.
- Sharp, Jasper (2008). Behind the Pink Curtain: The Complete History of Japanese Sex Cinema. Guildford: FAB Press. pp. 60, 366, etc. ISBN 978-1-903254-54-7.
- Weisser, Thomas; Yuko Mihara Weisser (1998). Japanese Cinema Encyclopedia: The Sex Films. Miami: Vital Books: Asian Cult Cinema Publications. p. 237. ISBN 1-889288-52-7.
- Mamoru Watanabe at Eizo 100.

=== Japanese ===
- 渡辺護 わたなべ・まもる (in Japanese). allcinema.net.
- 渡辺護 (in Japanese). Director's Guild of Japan. Archived from the original on 2007-11-10.
- 渡辺護 (in Japanese). Japanese Movie Database.
