= Wife to Be Sacrificed =

Wife to be Sacrificed
- Poster to the Nikkatsu Roman porno film, "Wife to be Sacrificed" (1974)
- Directed by: Masaru Konuma
- Written by: Yōzō Tanaka
- Starring: Naomi Tani; Nagatoshi Sakamoto; Terumi Azuma
- Cinematography: Masaru Mori
- Edited by: Jun Nabeshima
- Music by: Taichi Tsukimizato
- Distributed by: Nikkatsu
- Release date: October 26, 1974 (Japan)
- Running time: 71 minutes
- Country: Japan
- Language: Japanese

Wife to be Sacrificed (生贄夫人, Ikenie Fujin) (1974) is a Japanese soft-core pornographic S&M film starring Naomi Tani and directed by Masaru Konuma. The film was produced by Nikkatsu studios as part of their Roman Porno series.

== Background ==
In 1971, with theatrical audiences lost to television, Nikkatsu, Japan's oldest major film studio, had entered the soft-core pornography genre, previously dominated by independent pink film studios, in an effort to avoid bankruptcy. This move had proven highly successful for the studio for three years, but 1974 had been another difficult year for the studio. For years, Nikkatsu had been trying to recruit the "Queen of Pink," Naomi Tani, into their Roman Porno series, but because Nikkatsu had been reluctant to enter the S&M genre, which was Tani's specialty, she had refused. When Nikkatsu finally consented to Tani's request to star her in a film based on Oniroku Dan's S&M novel Flower and Snake, the film—Flower and Snake (1974), directed by Masaru Konuma—became one of the studio's first successes of the year. The studio followed this first successful venture into the S&M genre with Wife to be Sacrificed, another starring role for Tani, again directed by Konuma. Because Oniroku Dan had objected to Konuma's handling of Flower and Snake, he was not involved in the making of Wife to be Sacrificed, though he later gave Nikkatsu exclusive rights to the filming of his novels. The resulting film, together with the earlier Flower and Snake (also directed by Konuma in 1974, and starring the same female and male leads) is credited with starting the S&M Roman Porno series which helped save Nikkatsu from financial collapse during the 1970s. Wife to Be Sacrificed became Nikkatsu's biggest hit of 1974, and remains one of their top five successes of all time. It also established Naomi Tani as the first of Nikkatsu’s SM Queens.

== Plot ==
Akiko (Naomi Tani) is startled to find her estranged husband, Kunisada (Nagatoshi Sakamoto), in a car watching a young, pre-pubescent girl urinate by the side of a road. When Akiko returns home, the girl, Miko, follows crying that "Uncle" has disappeared. Akiko turns the girl over to the police. Later, while she is giving ikebana lessons at home, the police return to ask Akiko for information about Kunisada. It is revealed that he had disappeared three years ago after being arrested for a sexual crime involving a high school girl.

Kunisada follows Akiko to her mother's grave, where he kidnaps her, and takes her to an isolated cabin in the countryside. Here he subjects her to numerous degrading sexual tortures and punishments for days on end. When Kunisada leaves the cabin to get Akiko's wedding dress from her home, Akiko escapes. Wearing only a sheet and the ropes she had been tied in, she meets two hunters who, instead of helping her, rape her. Kunisada finds her unconscious in the woods, cleans her and dresses her in her traditional Japanese wedding clothes, complete with make-up, and suspends her from pulleys in the cabin and shaves her pubic hair.

While fishing, Kunisada comes across an unconscious young couple—Kaoru (Terumi Azuma) and Kiyoshi (Hidetoshi Kageyama)—that had failed in committing double suicide. He rapes the girl, Kaoru, then takes them to the cabin where he binds them. After giving Kaoru an enema, he has Akiko have sex with Kiyoshi while Kunisada has sex with Kaoru. He continues submitting them to various humiliations in order to destroy their love for each other. After he thinks he has succeeded, he unties them and tells them he has no more use for them, they are free to stay or go.

By now Akiko has come to accept Kunisada's behavior, and apparently enjoy it. She pushes him even further with commands to, "Whip me harder... abuse me..." After one such session in the woods, Akiko and Kunisada return to the cabin where they find that the young couple has bound themselves together and committed double-suicide through strangulation. Akiko tells Kunisada that they have played the final joke on him.

Meanwhile, two police detectives are following Miko, believing that she will lead them to Kunisada. Miko eludes the police, but they find the cabin with the dead young couple still bound together and Akiko naked and tied up. When they attempt to release Akiko she tells them, "Don't untie me. I like it this way."

The police ask her where Kunisada has gone. Akiko replies that he has escaped, then, laughing, adds, "It's funny, but I think he's afraid of me."

As the end credits roll, Kunisada is walking through the countryside holding Miko's hand, and Akiko is still in the cabin, tied up naked and squirming.

== Cast ==
- Naomi Tani
- Terumi Azuma
- Nagatoshi Sakamoto
- Hidetoshi Kageyama
- Chigusa Takayama

== Critical appraisal ==
The film retains a high reputation among critics and fans of Nikkatsu's Roman porn, who generally consider it one of, if not the best of the series. The San Francisco Chronicle said of it, "It’s like watching a sexual madhouse." The Chicago Tribune called it, "Artistically potent." In their Japanese Cinema Encyclopedia: The Sex Films, Thomas and Yuko Weisser write, "The early sado films of Masaru Konuma are well scripted, stylishly directed, and singularly harrowing. This one is easily his best." Ray Ranaletta called Wife to be Sacrificed, "a groundbreaking film that rises above a simple geek-show mentality and presents its sadomasochistic theme in uncompromising terms—forcing the viewer to deal with the film on a rational, objective level, while at the same time reveling in its sheer, sexual outrageousness."

The Scarecrow Video movie guide says, "this is a shockingly graceful film, beautifully shot and lovingly realized by Konuma, lending a dream-like quality to the whole thing."

== Production ==
Wife to Be Sacrificed was filmed on location at an abandoned house, with an old-fashioned outhouse which is featured in perhaps the film's most controversial scene. Early in the film, Kunisada refuses to let Akiko relieve herself for a long period of time, and then forces her to defecate with the door open and him watching. About the fleeting shot of Akiko's excrement, Tani later commented that, "...back then, it was so shocking." Because of the controversial nature of the shot for its time, Konuma had to cut the one-second shot of Akiko's feces down to four frames, or one-sixth of a second. When interviewing Konuma, Hideo Nakata commented on the unusual color of the dropping. Konuma replied, "I made it like that! I thought a beautiful woman's turd should be thick and brightly colored. That's the imagery I wanted to shoot."

== U.S. theatrical release ==
In 1998, in an effort to introduce the Japanese-film fans of America to one of the most popular Japanese film genres (i.e., the pinku eiga), Phaedra Cinema released Wife to be Sacrificed theatrically in the U.S. on a double-bill with Noburu Tanaka's A Woman Called Sada Abe (1975). It premiered in San Francisco in June, opening to very favorable reviews. Beginning October 30, 1998 it played for a week at the Monica 4-Plex theater in Los Angeles. Despite the film's age, it proved too controversial for some American critics. Critics from the Los Angeles Times left the theater in disgust within 20 minutes of the start of the film. Phaedra founder Gregory Hatanaka commented, "Most people just don't understand the historical value of the films. If people walk in expecting Sex and Zen, well, they're obviously not going to get it. These are dark films, and very serious. And yes, shock value is a part of their appeal."

== Availability ==
Image Entertainment, in partnership with KimStim Entertainment, released Wife to be Sacrificed on Region 1 DVD in the U.S. in 2003. This DVD presented the film in the original Japanese language with non-removable English subtitles and in a non-anamorphic widescreen format. This version of the film was re-released on May 10, 2005.

Image Entertainment and KimStim Entertainment released a second DVD of Wife to Be Sacrificed in November 2007. In addition to a digitally restored version of the film in anamorphic format with removable English subtitles, extras on this disc include the film's original theatrical trailer and a biography of director Masaru Konuma. The major special feature of this disc is director Hideo Nakata's 2001 documentary on Konuma entitled Sadistic and Masochistic. At 91 minutes, this extra is longer than the main film on the disc. In addition to some biographical reminiscences by Konuma, the documentary consists mostly of a series of meetings and interviews between Konuma and his old colleagues. The centerpiece of the film is a reunion with Naomi Tani. The director and the actress watch Wife to Be Sacrificed in a theater, and then discuss the making of the film at a restaurant. When the outhouse sequence of the film comes up during the conversation, Konuma looks at his dish and comments, to the amusement of both Tani and Nakata, "I really shouldn't have ordered curry."

== Bibliography ==
- Ikenie fujin at IMDb
- "生贄夫人 (Ikenie Fujin)" (in Japanese). Japanese Movie Database.
- Needham, Gary. (2000). "Don't untie me! I like it this way! An essay on the role of Feminism as portrayed in Wife to be Sacrificed" in Asian Cult Cinema, #29 (October 2000), pp. 42–47.
- Ranaletta, Ray. (1998). "Wife to be Sacrificed - Coming to a Theater Near You?" in Asian Cult Cinema, #19 (April 1998), pp. 49–50.
- Wife to be Sacrificed at Amazon.com
- Wife to be Sacrificed (Ikenie fujin) at kino.com
- Wife to be Sacrificed at Yahoo.com
- Weisser, Thomas; Yuko Mihara Weisser (1998). Japanese Cinema Encyclopedia: The Sex Films. Miami: Vital Books : Asian Cult Cinema Publications. ISBN 1-889288-52-7.
- "Une Femme à sacrifier". Sancho.does.Asia (in French). September 25, 2005.
