= Naomi Tani =

Japanese pink film actress (born 1948)

- Born: 20 October 1948 (age 77); Hakata Ward, Fukuoka, Japan

Naomi Tani (谷ナオミ, Tani Naomi; born 20 October 1948) is a Japanese pink film actress who is best known for her appearances in Nikkatsu's Roman Porno films with an S&M theme during the 1970s.

== Life and career ==
=== Early ===
Born October 20, 1948, in the Hakata ward of Fukuoka, Naomi Tani moved to Tokyo at the age of 18. After arrival in Tokyo, she was featured in a photo layout in Weekly Taishu / Popular Weekly (週刊大衆 - Shukan Taishu). This appearance led to offers for roles in "Pink films", the low-budget, independent soft-core pornographic films which dominated Japan's domestic cinema at this time. Her debut was in the 1967 film Special. She took her screen name "Tani" from the novelist Jun'ichirō Tanizaki and "Naomi" from the central character in his important early work A Fool's Love. "Tani," or "valley," is also a Japanese slang word for the cleavage between the breasts. Consequently, Ms. Tani may have had a variety of puns in mind when she later opened a restaurant calling it the "Ohtani" (Big Breasts or Big Tani).

Tani's early films were principally with the small companies that were making pink films independent of the large studio system in the 1960s. In her pre-Nikkatsu career, she appeared in comedies, dramas, and action films, but it was the S&M genre which would make Tani a star. Her debut film was Special (スペシャル - Supesharu) for Shin Nihon Eigasha and directed by the prolific pink film auteur Kōji Seki. The film had Tani in the role of the mistress of a black marketeer who tries to cheat people at an onsen. The couple is stopped by the local villagers. Experiments on the Human Body (Zanki: Seitaijikken 1967) was a war drama in which Tani played a nurse in China where Japanese doctors are performing experiments on Chinese POWs.

Tani had a minor role in director Mamoru Watanabe's Slave Widow, which starred major "pink" actresses Noriko Tatsumi and Mari Iwai. Impressed with Tani, Watanabe, considered one of the "Pillars of Pink," cast Tani in her first leading role for his next film, Bed of Violent Desires (1967). Typical of the sex-thriller pink films made by Koei studio in the years before Nikkatsu took over the genre in the 1970s, in this film, Tani plays the role of a daughter who seeks bloody revenge against her mother and her lover after they kill Tani's father for his money. Tani's first experience with an S&M film was in one episode of the omnibus film Memoirs Of A Modern Female Doctor (1967), and her first full-fledged S&M leading role was in director Masanao Sakao's Cruel Map of Women's Bodies (1967), in which she plays a prostitute who repeatedly escapes from, and then captured and tortured by the yakuza. Tani would play similar roles for Sakao in other films such as Virgins With Bad Reputations, also made in 1967.

During this early stage of her career, Tani sometimes worked at prominent pink film producer/director Kōji Wakamatsu's independent studio. She worked several times with the prolific director Shinya Yamamoto in such films as Degenerate (1967), Memoirs of Modern Love: Curious Age (1967) and Season For Rapists (1969). Also during this period she became friends with the SM author, Oniroku Dan, with whom she would work throughout her film career. Dan was secretly writing S&M film scripts under the pseudonym Matsugoro Kuroiwa while working as a high school English teacher. Tani's "pretty face, beautiful fair skin... and 96cm (38") large breasts" as well as her acting abilities helped make her a popular actress in the late 1960s. She reportedly appeared in more than 200 films before her work with Nikkatsu, for which she is best known today. Even at this early stage of her career, working for independent studios, Tani had already established herself as the "Queen of Pink." As an indication of her growing prominence as a representative of the erotic cinema in Japan, she appeared in the U.S. Playboy's December 1968 issue in their "Girls of the Orient" pictorial article. In 1972, she directed two films from Oniroku Dan stories, Sex Killer and Starved Sex Beast. Commenting on her own directorial style, Tani noted, "I accentuated scenes with a lot of torture and bondage."

=== Nikkatsu ===
Throughout the 1960s, softcore pornographic "Pink Films" had been produced in Japan by small, independent studios. In 1971, however, Nikkatsu, the country's oldest film studio, had entered the "Pink Film" market with its high-budget and quality "Roman Porno" series.

Besides appearing in Nikkatsu's first experiment in the pink film in 1968, Tokyo Bathhouse (Onna Ukiyo Buro), which featured over 30 sex-film stars in cameo appearances, Tani's first official Roman porno for Nikkatsu was in a minor role as a nurse in Sensuous Beasts (1972). Unlike her starring roles for smaller studios, she played a supporting role in this film. Preferring to continue starring in lower-budget films rather than playing supporting roles for Nikkatsu's leading Roman Porno actresses, she did not stay with Nikkatsu at this time.

Even when Nikkatsu began asking Tani to work for their studio in major roles, she refused for years because Nikkatsu was reluctant to enter the S&M genre with its Roman Porno series. Feeling that S&M was her destiny, Tani consented to work at Nikkatsu only on the condition that her first film be based on Oniroku Dan's novel, Flower and Snake. Nikkatsu agreed. Directed by Masaru Konuma, this 1974 film became a major hit for Nikkatsu.

Tani's next film for Nikkatsu, Wife to Be Sacrificed (1974) was also directed by Konuma, though, unlike most of her films for the studio, this one was not based on an Oniroku Dan novel. It became an even bigger hit than Flower and Snake, and one of Nikkatsu's all-time top five moneymakers. Flower and Snake and Wife to Be Sacrificed are credited with starting the S&M Roman Porno series which helped save Nikkatsu from financial collapse during the 1970s. Wife to Be Sacrificed became Nikkatsu's biggest hit of 1974, and remains one of their top five successes of all time. It also established Naomi Tani as the first of Nikkatsu’s SM Queens. Tani's female co-star from Wife to Be Sacrificed, Terumi Azuma, would return in the 1975 film, Cruelty: Black Rose Torture, and the two would be paired in several other films until Azuma began starring in her own films in 1976. The title introduced Nikkatsu's nickname for Tani ("Black Rose"), which would be re-used in later film titles. In Konuma's 1977 parody of the Roman porn genre, In the Realm of Sex, Tani appears as herself, stalked by a perverted middle-aged fan who wants to perform an S&M session with her. Tani manages to reverse the roles by binding and torturing the fan instead.

Besides Konuma, Tani worked for many of the other most prominent Roman porno directors while at Nikkatsu. "Violent pink" director Yasuharu Hasebe commented, "I regret that I only worked with her once... a very short scene at a greenhouse in Rape! The segment was only long enough for her to get assaulted by the rapist." Tani starred in director Kōyū Ohara's Nikkatsu Roman pornos, Fascination: Portrait of a Lady (1977), Rope Hell (1978) and Fairy in a Cage (1977) which had Tani playing the role of a wealthy business woman who is tortured by the sadistic head of the inquisition branch of the Japanese military during World War II.

Director Shōgorō Nishimura's 1978 film, Lady Black Rose, contained two notorious scenes which are often selected as examples of the Roman porno S&M genre. In one, gallons of water are forced into Tani's mouth through a funnel while her stomach can be seen enlarging. Tani points out that scenes like these were often tricks, though no special effects were involved. "I was simply good at sucking my belly into a small ball and then expanding it." In the other, gallons of brandy are similarly poured into Tani's vagina while her body can be seen flushing from pale white to a drunken red. The film is alternately praised and condemned as "the ultimate woman-as-an-object" film. Tani's last film, Rope and Skin (1979) was also directed by Nishimura, once again based on an Oniroku Dan novel, and had a part for fellow "Pink queen," Junko Miyashita. As Tani's farewell performance, Nikkatsu gave this critically acclaimed yakuza period-piece a big budget.

=== Tani's style ===
Known for her remarkable dedication to her work, Tani would perform even the most extreme of S&M scenes without complaint. During the twelve years she worked as an actress, she never went to the beach or allowed herself to get a suntan, feeling that it was important to keep her skin very white, so that it could be seen turning red during some of the scenes involving such things as whippings or melting candle wax tortures. Tani wrote in 1998 "The woman's naked body must not only be seen as a sensual object, but must also be able to express emotion; so, I did my best to keep Naomi Tani's body as close as possible to perfect condition."

When Tani was asked if she ever found herself sexually aroused while making a film, she stressed the artistry behind her performances, commenting that the face of a woman in actual sexual ecstasy would likely cause laughter. Instead, she says, "An actress has the responsibility to excite the audience, not herself." She further states, "... to gain sympathy from the audience, I engaged in elaborate discussions with the filmmakers concerning Naomi Tani's torture scenes, to insure that they were both cruel and beautiful." Her willingness to submit herself to scenes of extreme physical difficulty led director Shinya Yamamoto to famously utter, "Naomi Tani is a monster!"

The quality of her performances was recognized by the mainstream Japanese film establishment. She was nominated for best actress by the Japanese Academy for two of her Nikkatsu Roman Porno films, Lady Black Rose, and Flesh of the Rose, (both 1978). Director Masaru Konuma says as an actress Tani was, "Stylish. No matter what she did-- her behavior, her attitude, her body-- everything became a perfect picture."

In his Behind the Mask: On Sexual Demons, Sacred Mothers, Transvestites, Gangsters, Drifters, and Other Japanese Cultural Heroes, Ian Buruma describes Tani as the most celebrated porn star of her time, "combin[ing] the savage and the maternal." To explain her popularity he says she "looked like a Japanese mother, her ample breasts tucked into a matronly kimono. She was the ideal object for men to take their anxieties out in, like the patient mother being pummelled by her sons. She was the Mother Goddess in bondage, the passive cross-bearer of masculine inadequacy."

=== Retirement ===
In 1979, after reigning for five years as Nikkatsu's "Queen Of S&M," Tani retired suddenly and unexpectedly at the height of her popularity. She later gave her reason as, "I never wanted to disappoint my fans by showing an unflattering face. That's why I've always refused to do a comeback. Nobody is free from aging. I want to exist in the audience's memory as a forever blooming flower."

She celebrated her retirement by issuing a vocal album entitled Modae no Heya. On this disc's recent re-release in CD format, a reviewer commented of Tani's vocals, "There’s a worldliness in her voice and a maturity which suggests she’s seen it all... There is however a fragility to her voice, a cracking sense of the truly erotic, the unseen, the taboo which drapes each syllable... hearing music which would usually be readily associated with a mid-70s Samurai movie bedding down with such muted eroticism is more than a winning formula."

Tani notes that she immediately felt much more relaxed upon retirement. "I didn't have to worry about going out in the sun. I could suddenly enjoy the outdoors, golf and the beach." Her early retirement from film was clouded by difficulty however. In 1981 she was hit by a car while walking her dog, and had to undergo extensive rehabilitation for three years. This difficult period in her life continued with her 1984 divorce from her husband. After the divorce, she opened the Ohtani restaurant in Kumamoto, which became highly successful, and which she currently owns. In 1996 she also opened "Yours Naomi", a video store near Hakata which specializes in erotic cinema, especially Nikkatsu's Roman Porno films. She comments that "Many young people (in their 20s and 30s) who used to buy the mindless AV [Adult Video] junk have shifted to 'Roman Porn' after being introduced to it."

During the late 1990s Tani's work enjoyed a renewed surge of interest. Wife to be Sacrificed was released theatrically in the U.S. in 1998, playing in San Francisco, Los Angeles and New York City. In preparation for this event, Tani was interviewed by the U.S. publication, Asian Cult Cinema for its April, 1998 issue. Surprised by this attention from the U.S., Tani commented "I didn't think U.S. movie fans were interested in me or my movies. I thought Americans ignored my films because of the SM theme, since these movies give the impression of being abusive toward women. Regardless of the filmmaker's intent - the intellectual or artistic merit - I thought Americans viewed these productions as politically incorrect."

This attention from the U.S. again brought Tani to the attention of the domestic Japanese media. At the time, Tani wrote, "the fact that people are still interested in me - after almost 20 years away from the screen - fills me with buoyancy and surprise. It embarrasses me, too." In this retrospective atmosphere, Tani was finally persuaded to return to film in 2000 to appear in Hideo Nakata's documentary on director Masaru Konuma entitled Sadistic and Masochistic.

Four of Oniroku Dan's stories, originally published in Japanese in 1997, were published in English in 2010 by Vertical, Inc. The collection of these stories is titled Season of Infidelity; the collection’s last story, Bewitching Bloom, is a telling of Dan’s relationship with Tani, and also includes notes about three subsequent Nikkatsu "Queens"; Junko Mabuki, Izumi Shima, and Miki Takakura.

== Selected filmography ==
- Special (1967) (debut)
- Bed Dance (1967)
- Cruel Map of Women's Bodies (1967)
- Memoirs of Modern Love: Curious Age (1967)
- Slave Widow (1967)
- Flower and Snake (1974)
- Wife to be Sacrificed (1974)
- Cruelty: Black Rose Torture (1975)
- Oryu's Passion: Bondage Skin (1975)
- Newlywed Hell (1975)
- Lady Moonflower (1976)
- Fascination: Portrait of a Lady (1977)
- Fairy in a Cage (1977)
- Female Convict 101: Suck (1977)
- Lady Black Rose (1978)
- Rope Cosmetology (1978)
- Rope Hell (1978)
- Rope and Skin (1979) (Last starring film)
- Sadistic and Masochistic (2000) (Return to film for documentary on director Masaru Konuma)

== Magazine appearances ==
- December, 1968 Playboy (U.S.) (nude)
- December 15, 1975 Heibon Punch (平凡パンチ) (nude)
- November 16, 1976 Weekly Playboy (nude)
- November 7, 1977 Heibon Punch (平凡パンチ) (nude)
- July 17, 1979 Weekly Playboy (nude)
- October 22, 2002 Weekly Playboy (nude)
- April 15, 2003 Weekly Playboy (nude)

== Sources ==
- Konuma, Masaru. (1998). Interviewed by Thomas and Yuko Mihara Weisser on November 6, 1998, in Asian Cult Cinema, #22, 1st Quarter, 1999. p. 19-28.
- Miura, Jun (2004). 永遠のＳＭ女優 谷ナオミ (Naomi Tani : The Eternal SM Actress) (in Japanese). Tokyo: コアマガジン (Core Magazine). ISBN 4-87734-677-5.
- "NAOMI TANI". The Complete Index to World Film.
- Naomi Tani at IMDb
- "Naomi Tani - Showa Karesusuki" (in Japanese). infoseek.co.jp. Archived from the original on 25 December 2007.
- "谷ナオミ (Tani Naomi)" (in Japanese). JMDB.
- Saotome, Hiromi (10 March 2006). "SMの女王*谷ナオミ ("SM Queen: Naomi Tani")". ロマンポルノ女優 (Roman Porno Actresses) (in Japanese). Tokyo: Kawade Shobo Shinsha, Publishers. pp. 35–43. ISBN 4-309-48156-6.
- Tani, Naomi. Interviewed by Hamamoto, Maki. (1998). "Naomi Tani - An Interview with Nikkatsu's Queen of SM" (Conducted in January 1998 in Kyushu, Japan) in Asian Cult Cinema Number 19, April 1998. P.39-48.
- Tani, Naomi. "Introduction" in Weisser, Thomas; Yuko Mihara Weisser (1998). Japanese Cinema Encyclopedia: The Sex Films. Miami: Vital Books : Asian Cult Cinema Publications. pp. 9–12. ISBN 1-889288-52-7.
- "【東京シネマのぞき見隊】(39): 永遠のSM女王・谷ナオミとその崇拝者 ("Tokyo Cinema Preview Party (39): Eternal SM Queen, Naomi Tani and Her Worshipers")" (in Japanese). MovieWalker. 18 March 2005.
- "TANI Naomi" (in French). www.cinemasie.com.
- Weisser, Thomas; Yuko Mihara Weisser (1998). Japanese Cinema Encyclopedia: The Sex Films. Miami: Vital Books : Asian Cult Cinema Publications. ISBN 1-889288-52-7.
- 谷ナオミ (in Japanese). Variety (Japanese edition).
