= Bondage rigger =

Tying bondage player

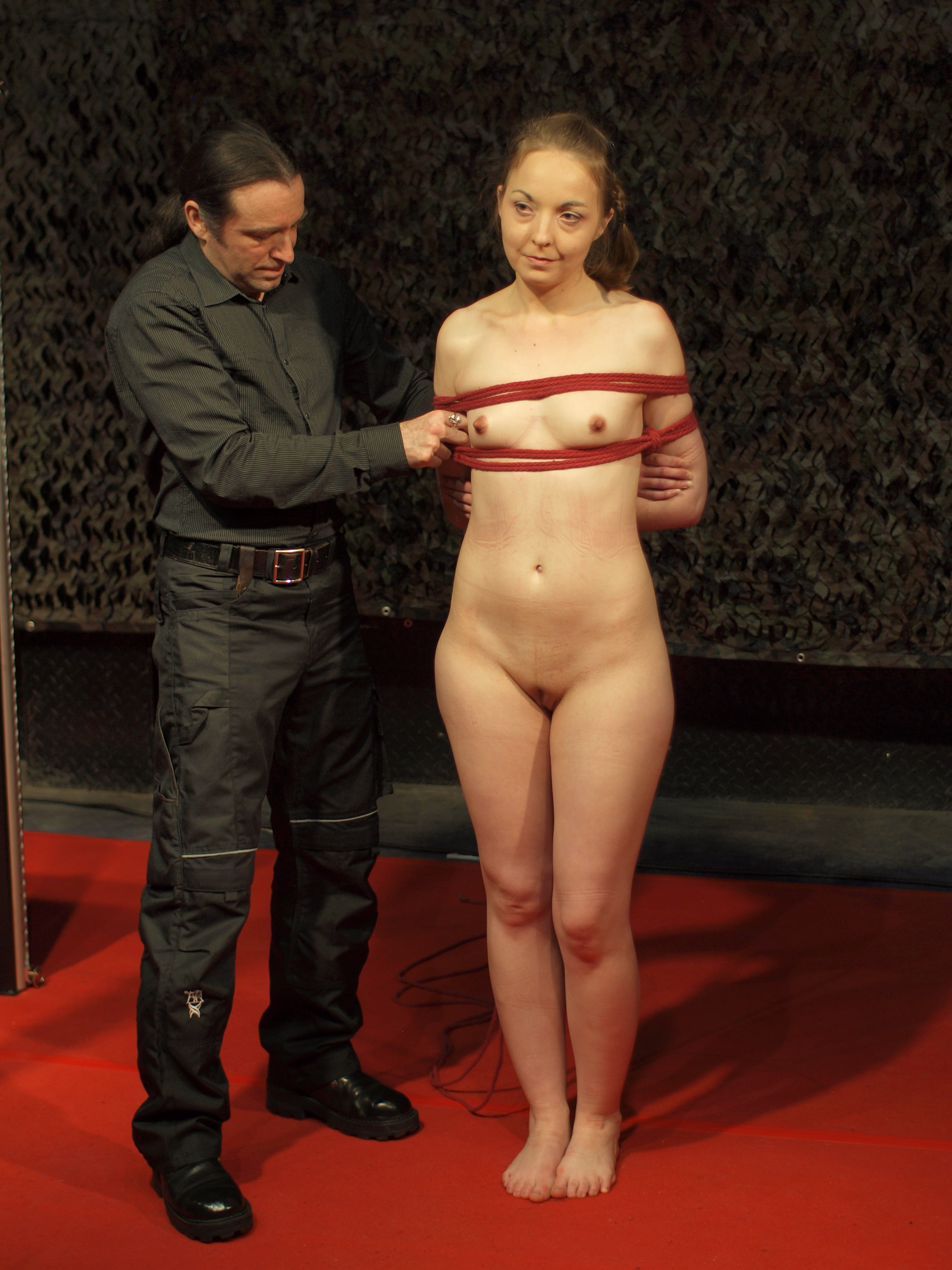
A male bondage rigger demonstrating rope bondage at BoundCon 2015 in Germany. The bondage technique used is box tie, a basic form of arm and breast bondage.

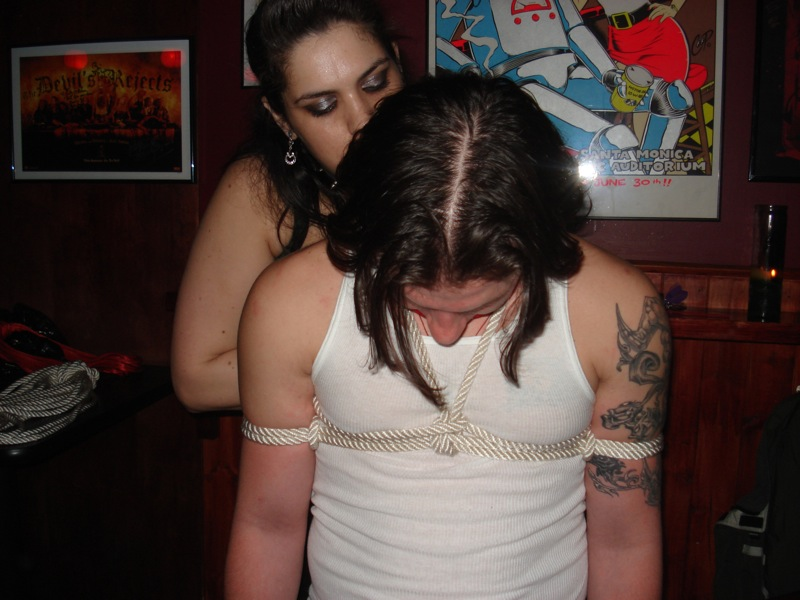
A rigger tying a model

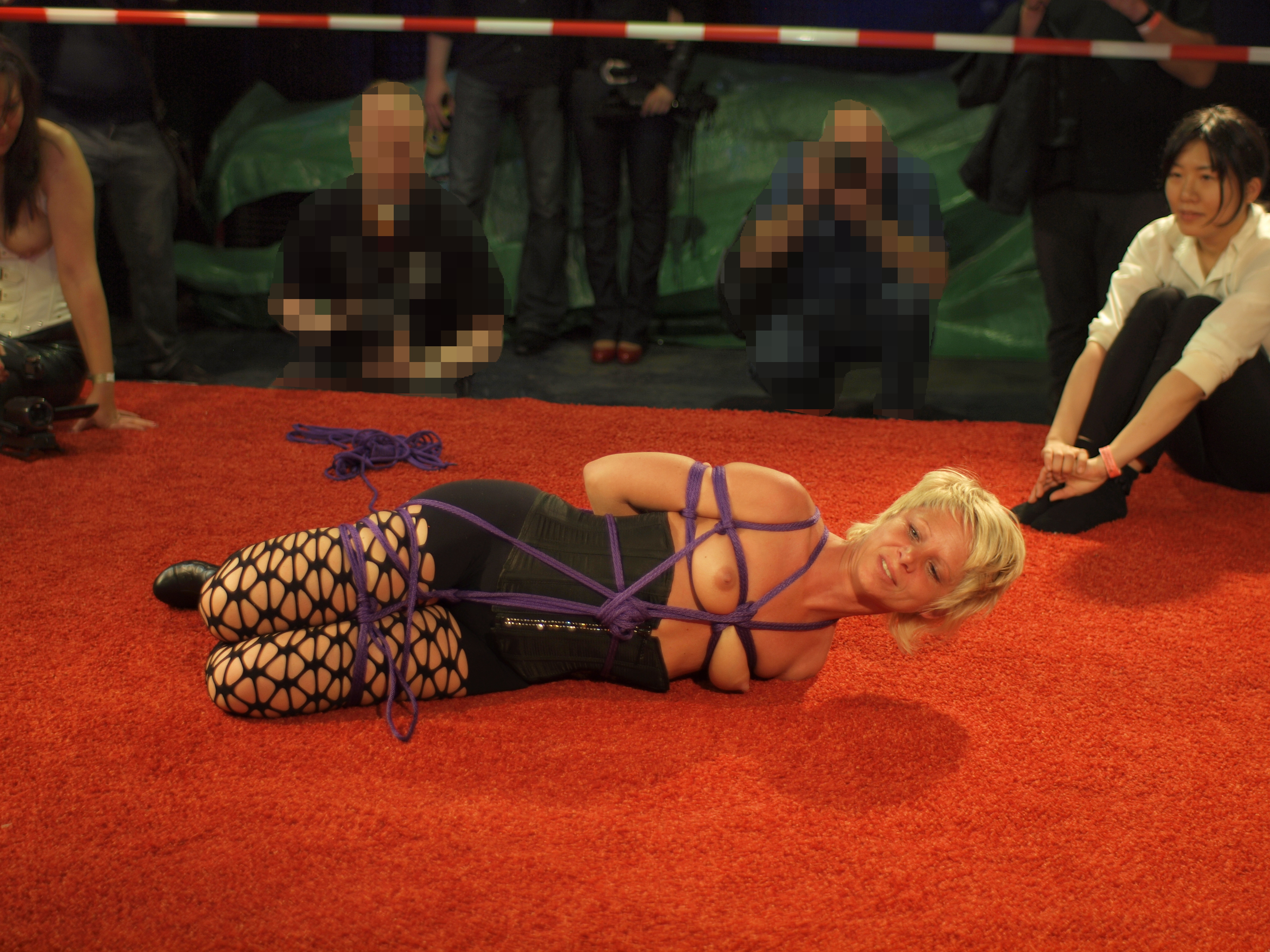
A female rigger stands by while a female model she has tied up tries to free herself

A bondage rigger is a person who practices the art of bondage, using any of a variety of materials such as rope, leather straps, or metal restraints.

Bondage riggers may participate in bondage for many reasons. These may include: as a form of BDSM or D/s play for personal enjoyment; as an art form, such as in the Japanese bondage styles shibari and kinbaku; or as an enterprise for profit, by selling books, videos, or photographs.

Bondage riggers work with one or more rope bottoms or bondage models, or may tie themselves in a practice called self-rigging or self-suspension. Some rope bottoms and bondage models are bondage riggers themselves.

Responsible bondage riggers always follow safety principles such as risk-aware consensual kink (RACK) when rigging.

== Notable examples ==
- Go Arisue (Japan)
- Damon Pierce (US)
- Jeff Gord (US)
- John Willie (US)
- Lee Harrington (US)
- Matthias T. J. Grimme (Germany)
- Midori (US)
- Randa Mai (Japan)

== See also ==
- Nawashi
- Bondage pornography
- Fetish art
