= Calm Before the Storm =

Calm Before the Storm or The Calm Before the Storm may refer to:

== Books, comics ==
- A History of Modern Tibet, Volume 2: The Calm Before the Storm: 1951-1955 by Melvyn Goldstein (2007)
- The Calm Before the Storm, history book by Itamar Singer
- The Calm Before the Storm, Wraithborn Issue 4
- "The Calm Before the Storm", a chapter in Full Metal Panic! Sigma volume 16
- "The Calm Before the Storm", a chapter in Wandering Son volume 13 (嵐の前の静けさ "Arashi no Mae no Shizukesa")
- "The Calm Before the Storm", a chapter in Dragon Ball Z volume 17 (大対決戦前の休息 "Daikessen Mae no Kyūsoku")
- "The Calm Before the Storm", a chapter in Whistle! volume 22

== Film, TV and entertainment ==
- "The Calm Before the Storm", an episode of Gypsy Sisters, 2013
- "The Calm Before the Storm!", an episode of Vettai: Pledged to Hunt
- "The Calm Before the Storm", an episode of Tiger & Bunny
- "The Calm Before the Storm", an episode of Spice and Wolf
- "The Calm Before the Storm", an episode of Cardcaptor Sakura
- "The Calm Before the Storm", an episode of Beyblade V-Force
- "The Calm Before the Storm", an episode of Meerkat Manor
- "The Calm Before the Storm" (Ninjago), an episode of Ninjago

== Music ==
=== Albums ===
- Calm Before the Storm (Venom album)
- Calm Before the Storm (Paul Brandt album)
- Calm Before the Storm (Jon English album), 1980
- Calm Before the Storm (Lauren Harris album)
- Calm Before the Storm (Dare album)
- Calm Before the Storm, an EP by Set It Off
- The Calm Before the Storm (Colton Dixon album)
- The Calm Before the Storm (Tech N9ne album)
- The Calm Before the Storm, mixtape by Ghetts
- The Calm Before the Storm, Rafi Kirder and Sevan Kirder with Inish 2008
- Liverpool – The Calm Before the Storm, compilation album by The Real People
- Calm Before, an album by The Rising Storm (Remnant Records 1967)

=== Songs ===
- "Calm Before The Storm", by The Bats 1987
- "Calm Before The Storm", by Eddie Money from Can't Hold Back, 1986
- "Calm Before The Storm", by Sheena Easton from Take My Time, 1981
- "Calm Before The Storm", by Fall Out Boy from Take This to Your Grave
- "Calm Before the Storm", by Darude from Before the Storm
- "The Calm Before the Storm", a song by Sincere featuring Chris Rene
- "The Calm Before the Storm", by Sparks from Balls
- "The Calm Before the Storm", B-side of "Se a vida é (That's the Way Life Is)" by Pet Shop Boys
- "(This is Just) the Calm Before the Storm", single by Antony Harding
- "The Calm Before the Storm", by Arcana from Dark Age of Reason
- "The Calm Before the Storm", by Dreamscape from Everlight
- "The Calm Before the Storm", by Hollenthon from With Vilest of Worms to Dwell
- "The Calm Before the Storm", by Destruction from Inventor of Evil
- "The Calm Before the Storm", by Rubén Blades from Nothing But the Truth
- "The Calm Before the Storm", by Judas Priest from Nostradamus

== See also ==
- Storm Before Calm, 2002 album by Primordial
- "The Calm Before", and "The Storm" (The Walking Dead), the last two episodes of season 9 of The Walking Dead
- Calm After the Storm (disambiguation)
