= Damon Pierce =

Creator and owner of slavetobondage.com

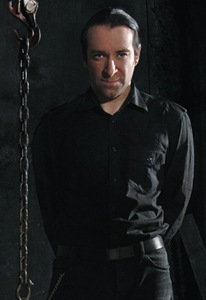
- Born: Los Angeles, California, U.S.
- Occupations: Bondage Rigger, BDSM Educator, Piercer, Adult entertainment Producer and Director
- Writing career
- Language: English
- Website: www.damonpierce.com/main.html

Damon Pierce is an American creator and owner of slavetobondage.com. In addition, he is a bondage rigger, BDSM educator, professional piercer, adult entertainment producer, and director from Los Angeles, California.

== Presentations and teaching events ==
- (2007) ShibariCon
- (2010) Dark Odyssey Leather Retreat
- (2011) Fetish Flea Market
- (2013-2015) BoundCon Germany
- (2013) Venus Fair Germany
- (2011-2014) BOLDCon
- (2014-2015-2016) Stockroom University
- (2016) Debauchery at Threshold
- (2016) Fetish Con
- (2016) BoundCon Austria

== Filmography ==
- (2006) The Rebelle Rousers
- (2007) House of Sex & Domination
- (2007-2009) Device Bondage
- (2009) High Strung Women
- (2009) Hardtied
- (2010) Hoisted
- (2010-2011) Infernal Restraints
- (2011) Mei I Please You?
- (2011) It Part Three
- (2014) ROPE

== Awards ==
- 2009 - AVN Award Winner – Best Best BDSM Release - House of Sex & Domination
- 2009 - Ninfa Award Winner for Best BDSM Film - House of Sex & Domination
