= Tight binding (disambiguation) =

In physics, the tight binding method is a technique used to calculate the electronic band structure of solids.

Tight binding may also refer to:

- Tight adhesion in Leukocyte extravasation
- Kinbaku (緊縛), meaning "tight binding", in Japanese bondage
