= Flower and Snake =

Flower and Snake may refer to:

- Flower and Snake (1974 film), a Japanese pink film
- Flower and Snake (2004 film), a Japanese film based on the 1974 film
- Flower and Snake: Zero, a 2014 Japanese erotic drama film
