= List of Whistle! chapters =

This is a list of chapters based on the manga series Whistle! by Daisuke Higuchi. It is the story of an up-and-coming soccer player. The manga was serialized in Weekly Shonen Jump in 1998 and was later licensed by Viz Media in North America.

== Volumes list ==
=== Whistle! ===
No.	Title	Original release date	North America release date
01	Break Through	July 3, 1998; 4-08-872580-8	October 12, 2004; 1-59116-685-3
01. "Break Through"; 02. "Special Midnight Training"; 03. "Us"; 04. "For Tomorrow"; 05. "The Power of Dreams"; 06. "Decisive Battle"; 07. "The Breaking Up of the Soccer Club"
02	On Your Marks	October 2, 1998; 4-08-872621-9	November 10, 2004; 1-59116-686-1
08. "The Taste of Oden"; 09. "A Sincere Heart"; 10. "Lottery of Fate"; 11. "The Reason Why One Cannot Lose"; 12. "The Long Road Towards the Soccer Field"; 13. "On Your Marks"; 14. "I am Here"; 15. "Eye Contact"; 16. "Losing to the Goal!"
03	Vor	December 3, 1998; 4-08-872643-X	January 4, 2005; 1-59116-692-6
17. "Thanks"; 18. "If You Can Dream, You Can Do It!"; 19. "VOR! Go Further Up Front Than Anyone Else"; 20. "Offense and Defence Right in Front of the Goal"; 21. "Go Forward"; 22. "The Limit"; 23. "Beyond the Limit"; 24. "Rebellion Alone"; 25. "The Thought Encapsulated in 22cm"; 26. "No.9's Miracle"
04	Re-start!	February 4, 1999; 4-08-872673-1	March 1, 2005; 1-59116-727-2
27. "Re-start!"; 28. "The Man Who Calls Forth the Storm?!"; 29. "Climb Over the Wall!"; 30. "Born Again. Josui Soccer Team Begins!!"; 31. "Practise Match"; 32. "Moon After the Rain"; 33. "Trial!"; 34. "Be True to Yourself"; 35. "Training Camp for Each!"
05	Pure Soul	April 2, 1999; 4-08-872700-2	May 3, 2005; 1-59116-789-2
36. "Retreat"; 37. "Space!"; 38. "We're Teammates, Aren't We?"; 39. "Pure Soul"; 40. "My Position"; 41. "Front and Back"; 42. "Declaration of War!"; 43. "Your Soccer, My Soccer"; 44. "What Can I Do?"
06	Be There	June 3, 1999; 4-08-872725-8	July 5, 2005; 1-59116-836-8
45. "Solitary Profile"; 46. "Road to the Future"; 47. "To That Sky (Be There)"; 48. "During the 88 Minutes"; 49. "Quickening!"; 50. "Weapon of My Own"; 51. "That Will That Shall Not Be Defeated"; 52. "A Mighty Kick"; 53. "Confidence and Anxiety"
07	Step By Step	September 3, 1999; 4-08-872762-2	September 6, 2005; 1-59116-973-9
54. "Keeper's Job"; 55. "Weakness"; 56. "Everlasting Passion (Step by Step)"; 57. "Key is Locked"; 58. "Nightmare of the Last Five Minutes"; 59. "What It Means to be a Teammate"; 60. "One Happiness"; 61. "Time to Go"; 62. "Stoppage Time"
08	Rain Cats and Dogs	November 4, 1999; 4-08-872787-8	November 8, 2005; 1-4215-0068-X
63. "Never Ending"; 64. "Dark Clouds"; 65. "Breaking Off"; 66. "Residue"; 67. "Entering the Rainy Season (Rain Cats and Dogs)"; 68. "Tatsuya Takes a Hit Like a Karate Chop"; 69. "Position Change"; 70. "State of Heart, State of Sky"; 71. "First Half Over"
09	Nobody is Perfect'	January 7, 2000; 4-08-872811-4	January 3, 2006; 1-4215-0206-2
72. "The One Who Goes Forward"; 73. "Josui Team, the Ascending Current"; 74. "The Bitter Memory"; 75. "Attacking and Defending at the End"; 76. "Team Josui Unites (Nobody is Perfect)"; 77. "Heated Penalty Match"; 78. "The Data or the Sixth Sense"; 79. "Soccer Ball of Love and Youth"; 80. "Students' Real Job...I Know, But..."
10	Brotherhood	March 3, 2000; 4-08-872838-6	March 7, 2006; 1-4215-0340-9
81. "Checking Out Hiba Junior High"; 82. "What Should We Do? How Will It End?"; 83. "Smile (Brotherhood)"; 84. "The Dream Dreamt in Kansai Dialect"; 85. "A Wing Descends"; 86. "A Remarkable Game"; 87. "The Greeting"; 88. "Josui on the Offensive"; 89. "Breaking Through the Flat 3"
11	Run	May 1, 2000; 4-08-872864-5	May 2, 2006; 1-4215-0685-8
90. "The Offense of Hiba Junior High"; 91. "Tsubasa is on Fire"; 92. "First Score"; 93. "Off in the Distance"; 94. "The Tying Goal"; 95. "Decision"; 96. "I'm Going to Win"; 97. "Run"; 98. "The Winning Goal"
12	In the Distance	July 4, 2000; 4-08-872889-0	July 5, 2006; 1-4215-0686-6
099. "The Conference Over Oden"; 100. "Family Meeting"; 101. "Spike"; 102. "The Day the Select Team Convenes (In the Distance)"; 103. "Skill Test (First Episode)"; 104. "Skill Test (Second Episode)"; 105. "Skill Test (Last Episode)"; 106. "Lunch Time"; 107. "Lawn is a Strong Enemy"
13	Dance With the Fear	October 4, 2000; 4-08-873017-8	September 5, 2006; 1-4215-0687-4
108. "Mini Game"; 109. "Mini Game, Part 2"; 110. "Barefootin' It"; 111. "An Unsettling Feeling"; 112. "Okonomiyaki Gambit"; 113. "Survival"; 114. "Mini Games Begin"; 115. "The Competition Moves Forward"; 116. "My Value as a Forward (Dance with the Fear)"
14	No Pain, No Gain	December 4, 2000; 4-08-873043-7	November 7, 2006; 1-4215-0688-2
117. "My Unique Weapon"; 118. "A Night With the Demon (No Pain, No Gain)"; 119. "Final Selection Begins"; 120. "Who Will Control Midfield?"; 121. "Trap of the Red and White Game"; 122. "Seizing the Striker's Spot"; 123. "Three United"; 124. "The Rival I Seek"; 125. "Led by the Pass"
15	One	February 2, 2001; 4-08-873074-7	January 2, 2007; 1-4215-0689-0
126. "The Trick Revealed"; 127. "Never Give in to a Midget"; 128. "Attacking in Waves"; 129. "The Power of Not Giving Up"; 130. "Final Announcement"; 131. "Crossroads for the Future"; 132. "The Path that Must Be Taken (One)"; 133. "Chosen Ones, Gather"; 134. "Reality is Thrust Upon Us"
16	Feel the Destiny	April 4, 2001; 4-08-873101-8	May 1, 2007; 1-4215-1107-X
135. "Running in Place"; 136. "Dissonant Hearts"; 137. "A Borrowed "No.10""; 138. "This is No.10"; 139. "The Talent of the Man Beside You"; 140. "Chance Meeting"; 141. "A Man Called Masahiro Suo"; 142. "Don't Talk So Small (Feel the Destiny)"; 143. "The Heart in Another Country"
17	Be Alive	July 4, 2001; 4-08-873132-8	September 4, 2007; 1-4215-1108-8
144. "A Public Showdown"; 145. "Resurrected Man"; 146. "The Troubled Man and the Challenger"; 147. "Who Gets to Go to Korea?!"; 148. "Second Keeper"; 149. "Historical Rival"; 150. "Landing in Korea"; 151. "Crimson Stadium (BE ALIVE)"; 152. "The Decisive Battle Kicks Off"
18	Change Over	October 4, 2001; 4-08-873170-0	January 1, 2008; 1-4215-1109-6
153. "Serious Game"; 154. "Snap Out of It!"; 155. "Play More"; 156. "The Control Tower Awakens"; 157. "Under the Snowy Skies of Seoul"; 158. "Testing the Trump Card"; 159. "Desperate Save"; 160. "Reliable Back"; 161. "Stare in Wonder"; 162. "Two Heroes (Change Over)"
19	Turning Point	December 4, 2001; 4-08-873196-4	May 6, 2008; 1-4215-1110-X
163. "Convinced of Victory"; 164. "Sworn Friends of 2002"; 165. "Expressing Her Love"; 166. "Out in Public Again..."; 167. "Take the Field"; 168. "Golden-Haired Freeman"; 169. "Declaration of War"; 170. "A Man Who Would Challenge the World (Turning Point)"; 171. "Information Gathering"; 172. "Earnest Shigeki"
20	Go On Together	March 4, 2002; 4-08-873230-8	September 2, 2008; 1-4215-1111-8
173. "King-Size Rival"; 174. "The Match Against Kanto Select Begins"; 175. "The Secret Strategy to Conquer Kanto"; 176. "Super Offensive Formation"; 177. "Solitary Talent"; 178. "Black Lightning"; 179. "A Lie He Hopes Will Come True"; 180. "The Match Against Tohoku Select Begins"; 181. "Target: Tsubasa"; 182. "Tsubasa Shot Down in the Dark"
21	Try on My Dreams	May 1, 2002; 4-08-873261-8	January 6, 2009; 1-4215-1656-X
183. "Unspoken Support"; 184. "Overlapping Memories"; 185. "From Gold General to Rook"; 186. "The Final Weapon's Willpower"; 187. "Not Gonna Quit Soccer"; 188. "The Night Before the Play-off"; 189. "He Scares Me"; 190. "Starting Member - Joy and Sorrow Intermingled (Try on My Dreams)"; 191. "The Sweeper"
22	Ultra Soul	September 4, 2002; 4-08-873317-7	May 5, 2009; 1-4215-2445-7
192. "Not Exactly a Genius"; 193. "Off the Ball"; 194. "Unflappable Kyushu Select"; 195. "Fierce Counterattack"; 196. "Attack Out of Adversity (Ultra Soul)"; 197. "I Acknowledge It"; 198. "Angry 11th Man"; 199. "He Who Stands Beyond the Goal"; 200. "The Calm Before the Storm"
23	Soldier Blue	December 4, 2002; 4-08-873354-1	September 1, 2009; 1-4215-2446-5
201. "True Skill of a Free Man, Part 1 (Soldier Blue)"; 201. "True Skill of a Free Man, Part 2 (Soldier Blue)"; 202. "A Display of True Skill"; 203. "An Old Friend Blocking the Way"; 204. "The Boundless Spirit of Challenge"; 205. "Are You Trying to Kill Me?"; 206. "I'm Pulling Ahead of You"; 206.5. "The Drama of 25 Centimetres"
24	You'll Never Walk Alone	March 4, 2003; 4-08-873396-7	January 5, 2010; 1-4215-2447-3
207. "Sho's Response"; 208. "Mass Production"; 209. "Determined Rebound"; 210. "Can't Lose! Don't Want to Lose!"; 211. "Pleiades in the Wind"; 212. "Journey to the Never Ending Dream"; Epilogue. "(The Last Story) You'll Never Walk Alone"

=== Whistle! W ===
No.	Japanese release date	Japanese ISBN
1	May 19, 2017	978-4-09-127607-0
2	November 10, 2017	978-4-09-128018-3
3	May 12, 2018	978-4-09-128316-0
4	January 18, 2019	978-4-09-128759-5
5	May 19, 2021	978-4-09-850582-1
