= Blood Hound (manga) =

Manga by Kaori Yuki

- Cover of Blood Hound as published by Hakusensha

夜型愛人専門店−ブラッドハウンド−DX (Yorugata Aijin Senmonten -Buraddo Haundo- DX)
- Genre: Drama, Psychological, Romance
- Manga
- Written by: Kaori Yuki
- Published by: Hakusensha
- Magazine: Bessatsu Hana to Yume, Hana to Yume
- Original run: January 2003 – January 2005
- Volumes: 1
- Television drama

Vampire Host
- Original network: TV Tokyo
- Original run: April 4, 2004 – June 27, 2004
- Episodes: 12

Blood Hound (Japanese: 夜型愛人専門店−ブラッドハウンド−DX, Hepburn: Yorugata Aijin Senmonten -Buraddo Haundo- DX), also known as Vampire Host, is a manga by Kaori Yuki. Appearing as a serial in the Japanese manga magazines Hana to Yume and Bessatsu Hana to Yume, the chapters of Blood Hound were compiled into a bound volume and published by Hakusensha in June 2004. Two more chapters followed in the January 2005 and August 2010 issues of Bessatsu Hana to Yume, as did a re-release in August 2010.

It focuses on a naive, loudmouthed teenager named Rion, who investigates a host club full of vampires when she suspects they must be related to the disappearance of a lot of people in the neighborhood, including her best friend. In the process she begins to befriend them, especially the leader Suou, with whom she develops a romantic relationship. Ultimately, she figures out the vampires are not the cause of the disappearances, but her adventures with the vampires are only beginning.

Vampire Host is a live-action television drama series loosely based on this manga. The series has been licensed in North America by Bandai Entertainment under the title of Bloodhound.

== Characters ==
=== Protagonist ===
Rion Kanou (狩野 莉音)
A teenager who initially suspects that the Host Club Krankenhaus is behind the disappearance of several people in her community, including her best friend. In the end, she figures out that the vampires are not responsible for the disappearances, but her school guidance councilor, who has sexual fetishism for blood. As a child, she was bitten by a vampire, leaving a mark "XXX" (30) on her neck. This birthmark represents the 30 silver coins Judas received as compensation for betraying Christ, signifying that she is a "descendant of Judas."

=== Krankenhaus members ===
Suou (蘇芳)
The lead host of Krankenhaus, who begins to develop a romantic relationship with Rion. He also suspects that she is the reincarnation of Ellone, "the one with the purest blood," whom he once loved.
Tienran (天藍, Tenran)
A blonde-haired man of Chinese descent. He serves as the manager and chef of Krankenhaus, they handle the odd jobs, he also possesses supernatural strength.
Sakura (桜, Sakura)
The bartender at Krankenhaus. They have an androgynous appearance, and their real name is Sakurazawa (桜沢).
Moegi (萌黄, Moegi)
The baby faced yet sharp-tongued member of the Krankenhaus. Despite looking the same age as Rion, she claims to be older than she looks. She has a habit of stripping when she gets drunk.
Shian (紫杏, Shian)
The "wild" host who enjoys napping.
Leghorn (レグホーン, Regghōn)

=== Others ===
Shihoko Aiga (相賀 志穂子, Aiga Shihoko)
Rion's best friend who disappeared after claiming she was going to give blood to the person she loved the most. She was the only one who didn't find Rion an outcast.
Suruga (駿河, Suruga)
A high school guidance councillor at the school where Rion studies. They live in a house behind Krankenhaus. They are the ones behind the disappearance of the young girls.
Kinuka Amagi (天毎木 衣華, Amagi Kinuka)
The daughter of the president of the Amagi Group, a hotel magnate. She suffers from a chest (likely heart) illness and has undergone numerous surgeries since childhood, leaving scars on her chest.

== Media ==
=== Manga ===
Written and illustrated by Kaori Yuki, Blood Hound debuted in the Japanese monthly manga magazine Bessatsu Hana to Yume in the January 2003 issue. The second chapter ran in the May 2004 issue of Bessatsu Hana to Yume, while the third appeared in the ninth issue of its biweekly sister magazine, Hana to Yume, for 2004. Hakusensha compiled the chapters into a bound volume and published it on 5 June 2004. Two more chapters later appeared in the January 2005 and August 2010 issues of Bessatsu Hana to Yume, and a re-release of the manga followed on 19 August 2010.

Blood Hound has been translated into French by Tonkam, Italian by Panini Comics, and German by Carlsen Comics.

=== TV drama ===
Blood Hound was adapted into a twelve episode TV drama as Vampire Host (ヴァンパイアホスト ～夜型愛人専門店～) starring Minako Komukai and TSUBASA GACKY.

Wint DVD releases
Volume	Released	Discs	Episodes
1	August 27, 2004	1	2
2	August 27, 2004	1	4
3	August 27, 2004	1	3
4	August 27, 2004	1	3
Box set	August 27, 2004	4	12

Bandai Entertainment licensed the drama and released the episodes in three volumes from April 17, 2007, to August 21, 2007. The series would air on Mnet America in 2011.

Bandai Entertainment DVD releases
Volume	Released	Discs	Episodes
1	April 17, 2007	1	4
2	June 13, 2007	1	4
3	August 21, 2007	1	4

== See also ==
- Vampire film
- List of vampire television series
