= Aya Sugimoto =

Japanese TV personality, actress, model (born 1968)

- Born: 19 July 1968 (age 57); Kyoto, Japan
- Other name: Tomoe Sugimoto
- Occupations: Tarento; actress; dancer; author; gravure idol; singer
- Years active: 1986–present
- Height: 1.68 m (5 ft 6 in)
- Website: office-aya.co.jp

Aya Sugimoto (杉本 彩, Sugimoto Aya; born July 19, 1968) is a Japanese TV personality, actress, dancer, author, gravure idol and singer born in Kyoto. She also had a J-pop career in the late 1980s to the early 1990s.

== Career ==
=== Early life ===
Aya Sugimoto grew up in Kyoto under a "strict" upbringing, making her first foray into the world of entertainment when she began modeling at age 15. Encouraged by her management company, she decided to embark on a singing career.

=== Singer and author (1988–2003) ===
She released nine singles and six albums between 1988 and 1991, including the number 1 hits "Boys" and "Gorgeous". Her most recent album in 1995 (Femme Fatale) followed a hiatus following her marriage to music producer Toshinori Numata.

As writer of many of her own lyrics which included erotic themes, she decided to turn her attention to writing erotic novels, publishing works including The Rules of Supreme Pleasure, Immoral and the book-length 2004 essay, Orgasm Life.

In July 2003, Sugimoto went through a high-profile divorce from her husband of 11 years. Sugimoto claimed that there was not enough sex in her marriage, and the term "sexless divorce" became a catch-phrase among frustrated wives in Japan. Sugimoto said, "I didn't think it was such a big deal. I actually thought that it was a healthier reason for wanting out than a lot of other mud-dragging type of divorces."

=== Acting (2003–) ===
After the notoriety she gained from the publicity surrounding the divorce, Sugimoto was one of the outspoken guests on the Friday late-night TV Tokyo talk show, Yearnings of the Goddess.

As an actress, she then appeared in the role of Queen Beryl in the 2003-2004 TV series Pretty Guardian Sailor Moon, a live action adaptation of the 1990s anime series.

In 2004, she starred in director Takashi Ishii's remake of Oniroku Dan's S&M novel, Flower and Snake. Working with bondage master Go Arisue, she reprised the role first played by Naomi Tani in director Masaru Konuma's version of the novel, Flower and Snake (1974). She spent approximately 75% of her screen time unclothed and participating in humiliating sexual acts but went on in the same year to be voted the second sexiest woman in Asia by Playboy magazine, beaten only by Zhang Ziyi.

In 2006 Sugimoto appeared alongside Japanese adult actress Sora Aoi in the midnight manga-inspired comedy-drama Shimokita Glory Days on TV Tokyo. The show also featured other adult actresses such as Yuma Asami in a story about a male college student moving to Tokyo and living in a shared house of women. Each of the twelve episodes were presented as 'lessons' which featured sexual themes and nudity. Sugimoto stated in an interview about the series that “society can’t consist only of ‘high-quality’ elements, and that's also true for visual eroticism as well.”

In September 2008, Sugimoto became the first Japanese model in PETA's international nude anti-fur campaign.

In November 2008 she performed a tango interpretation of the story of Sada Abe, a notorious prostitute who asphyxiated and castrated her lover. Titled Tango Nostalgia, the show was an extension of her performances on Nippon Television's Urinari Geinojin Shako Dansu-bu (ウリナリ芸能人社交ダンス部, a Japanese TV show similar to Dancing with the Stars in which she performed with comedian Kiyotaka Nanbara.

Sugimoto is currently a regular on the NTV variety show Majyotachi no 22ji, offering advice as a "love expert", alongside transgender entertainer Ai Haruna and model Tsubasa Masuwaka.

== Discography ==
=== Albums ===
- Aya (Panam, 1988) – mini album
- Mizu no Naka no Chiisana Taiyou (水の中の小さな太陽 "The Little Sun in the Water") (Panam, 1988)
- Shakunetsu Densetsu (灼熱伝説 "Red Hot Legend") (Panam, 1989) – mini album
- Body & Soul (Panam, 1990)
- Japanese Dream (Panam, 1990)
- Shiseikatsu (私生活 "Private Life") (BMG Victor, 1991)
- Femme Fatale (Nippon Columbia, 1995)

=== Singles ===
- "Boys" (Panam, 1988) – Cover version of the 1987 Italo disco song by Sabrina Salerno
- "13nichi no Luna" (13日のルナ "Luna on the 13th") (Panam, 1988)
- "Nichiyoubi wa Dame yo" (日曜日はダメよ "Sunday is No Good") (Panam, 1989)
- "B & S" (Panam, 1990)
- "Usagi" (うさぎ "Rabbit") (Panam, 1990)
- "Gorgeous" (ゴージャス) (Panam, 1990)
- "Kagayaitete..." (輝いてて・・・ "Shine On") (BMG Victor, 1991)
- "Ai ga Shiritai" (愛が知りたい – "I want to Know Love") (BMG Victor, 1992)
- "Le Soir ~Eien no Wakare~" (Le SOIR～永遠の別れ～) (BMG Victor, 1993)

== Filmography ==
=== Film ===
- 1987: Shōnan Bakusōzoku: Bomber Bikers of Shonan (Shōnan Bakusōzoku), dir. Nobutaka Nishizawa and Daiki Yamada
- 1993: Megami ga kureta natsu, dir. Takeo Imai
- 1994: A New Love in Tokyo (Ai no shinsekai), dir. Banmei Takahashi
- 1998: Ultraman Tiga & Ultraman Dyna: Warriors of the Star of Light (Urutoraman Tiga & Urutoraman Daina: Hikari no hoshi no senshi tachi), dir. Kazuya Konaka
- 2002: Ultraman Cosmos 2: The Blue Planet (Urutoraman Kosumosu: Za Burū Puranetto), dir. Tsugumi Kitaura
- 2003: Jam Films 2, dir. Hidenori Inoue
- 2004: Flower and Snake, dir. Takashi Ishii
- 2004: Girlfriend: Someone Please Stop the World, dir. Ryuichi Hiroki
- 2005: Gokudô no onna-tachi: Jôen, dir. Hajime Hashimoto
- 2005: Hana to hebi 2: Pari/Shizuko, dir. Takashi Ishii
- 2006: LoveDeath, dir. Ryuhei Kitamura
- 2006: Trapped Ashes, dir. Sean S. Cunningham, John Gaeta, Monte Hellman, Ken Russell and Joe Dante
- 2006: Ghost Train (Otoshimono), dir. Takeshi Furusawa
- 2007: Taitei no Ken, dir. Yukihiko Tsutsumi
- 2008: Johnen: Sada no ai, dir. Rokuro Mochizuki
- 2009: BLOOD Buraddo, dir. Ten Shimoyama
- 2010: Kamen Rider W Forever: A to Z/The Gaia Memories of Fate (Kamen Raidā Daburu Fōebā: Ē tu Zetto/Unmei no Gaia Memori), dir. Koichi Sakamoto
- 2021: Beautiful Lure, dir. Hiroshi Akabane
- 2021: Musicophilia, dir. Masaaki Taniguchi

=== Television ===
- 2003: Pretty Guardian Sailor Moon as Queen Beryl
- 2006: Jigoku Shōjo as Hone Onna

== Sources ==
- Aya Sugimoto at IMDb
- Ketchum, Jack. (2007). "Flower and Snake 2: A Dialogue" in Asian Cult Cinema, #54, pp. 57–62.
- "杉本 彩 (Sugimoto Aya)". i-dic.dorachan.com (in Japanese). Archived from the original on 2007-10-07.
- Aya Sugimoto is Nude for PETA Biography, Photos and video.
