= Go Arisue =

Japanese bondage artist

Go Arisue (有末 剛, Arisue Gō) is one of the world's top kinbakushi (Japanese bondage artists).

Born in 1954 he became interested in rope bondage at an early age inspired by paintings of the legendary bondage artist Seiu Ito and the works of Akira Minomura.

His career began in the 1970s when he worked for SM magazines like SM Select and SM Fan. He also did the bondage for movies, including the erotic romance Angel Guts: "Akai Nawa Hateru Made" (Until the Red Rope Runs Out), directed by Suzuki Junichi in 1987. In 2004, he did the rope work and appeared in the movie Flower and Snake, starring Aya Sugimoto and directed by Takashi Ishii. This was a remake of the 1974 film Flower and Snake, a soft-core classic based on the SM novel by Oniroku Dan. He is also featured in Bakushi, a 2007 documentary about the art of Japanese bondage, by Ryūichi Hiroki.

Today Arisue lives in Tokyo and works as a kinbaku performer, tutor and author, occasionally giving workshops abroad.

== Works ==
- Kinbakushi A's Ecstasy And Gloom, Ohta Publishing, 2008
- Arisue's Kinbaku Theory and Practices, Sanwa Publishing, 2008
- Kinbaku Mind and Techniques 1, Jugoya, 2009
- Kinbaku Mind and Techniques 2 (Floor Works 1), Jugoya, 2009
