= Randa Mai =

Japanese pornographic film director

Randa Mai or Mai Randa (乱田舞, Randa Mai) is a Japanese nawashi and adult video (AV) director.

== Life and career ==
Randa Mai was born on 25 March 1959 and has been working as a professional nawashi for many years. With his alias translated roughly as "wild dancer", he is known for AVs with bondage themes, such as the Snake Bondage (蛇縛, Jabaku) series for Attackers, as well as instructional videos on Japanese bondage.

Randa Mai describes himself as an "S&M entertainer" rather than a nawashi. He has also performed outside Japan, including Europe and United States, and runs Bar Randa Mai (Bar乱田舞) in Roppongi. As a martial artist he is versed in Shorinji Kempo.
