= Minako Komukai =

Japanese pornographic actress

- 小向 美奈子
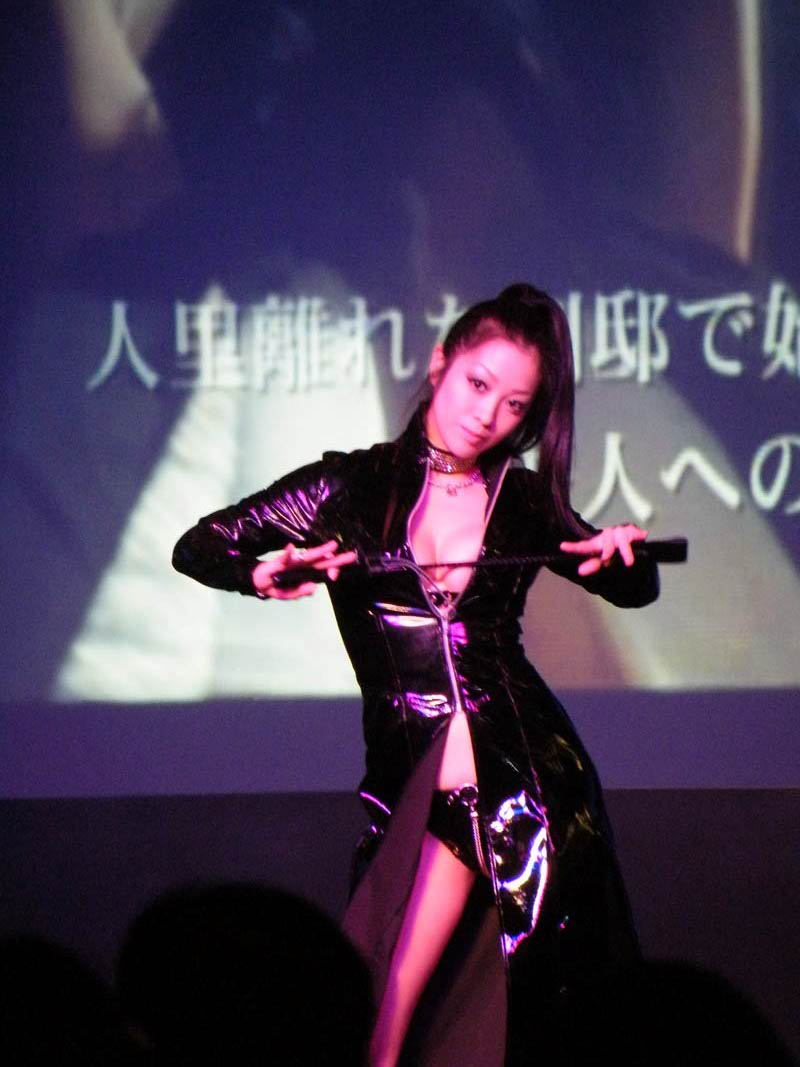
- Minako Komukai at Asia Adult Expo 2010
- Born: Minako Komukai; April 27, 1985 (age 41); Kanagawa, Japan
- Occupations: Pornographic film actress; actress; erotic dancer; gravure model
- Years active: 2001–present
- Website: www.minakokomukai.com

Minako Komukai (Japanese: 小向 美奈子, Hepburn: Komukai Minako; born April 27, 1985, in Kanagawa Prefecture, Japan) is a Japanese gravure model, actress, erotic dancer and AV idol.

== Life and career ==
=== Early career ===
After dropping out of school, at age 15 Komukai began her career as a "gravure model" and a swimsuit model. In 2001 she had a guest-star role as a schoolgirl in the Nippon Television comedy Danjiki: Buddhist Diet Secrets (歓迎！ダンジキ御一行様, Kangei! Danjiki Goikkosama). For her appearances as a gravure idol and on television, she was selected as a "Fuji Television Visual Queen" for 2001. The next year she starred in the anime series Whistle! (ホイッスル！), voicing the part of the boy hero Sho Kazamatsuri, broadcast in 2002 in 39 episodes on the Animax TV network. In 2003 Komukai starred in her first movie, the horror film Chain (チェーン) directed by Atsushi Shimizu and released to theaters on July 19, 2003.

Komukai was cast as Princess Freezia in the Toei's August 2003 theatrical release of Bakuryū Sentai Abaranger Deluxe: Abare Summer Is Freezing Cold!, part of the long-running Super Sentai series. She returned to TV work starring as high school girl Rion Kano in the TV Tokyo romantic supernatural series Vampire Host (ヴァンパイアホスト ～夜型愛人専門店～) which was broadcast from April to June 2004. She also starred in a very different role as the female sword fighter Sayuri in the period action drama Ranbu: Enbu kenshi (Ranbu 艶舞剣士), which reached theaters in November 2004.

In addition to modeling and acting, Komukai also appeared at Japanese video game events and eventually became acquainted with Metal Gear creator Hideo Kojima, appearing as a guest on his HIDECHAN! Radio show in 2006.

=== Legal issues ===
In September 2008, Komukai's agent R.I.P. (株式会社リップ) announced that they were cancelling her exclusive contract because her poor health, mental instability, and absences for the past few years had made it impossible for them to continue their support. In November of that same year, Komukai stirred the gravure world with her allegations that the industry was full of seedy types who attempt to solicit prostitution work out of the models although she denied any participation in prostitution activities herself.

In January 2009, she was arrested on drug charges. She was convicted in Tokyo District Court in February 2009 of drug law violations for using methamphetamines and was sentenced to 18 months in prison, suspended for three years. At the trial, Komukai said she had been using drugs since mid-2007 under coercion from the man she had been dating. Komukai published a tell-all autobiography in November 2009 titled I'm Really Sorry (いっぱい、ごめんネ。, Ippai, gomen ne) in which she talks about dropping out of high school, early sexual activity, and her drug problems.

Komukai starred in the 2010 Toei film Flower and Snake 3 (花と蛇３, Hana to hebi 3) directed by Yusuke Narita. This was a sequel to Toei's sadomasochistic-themed 2004 film Flower and Snake, which was itself a remake of the classic 1974 version (Flower and Snake). The Japan Times reviewer's opinion of her acting abilities was not flattering. In 2010, Komukai started a career as a stripper.

When Tokyo police broke up a group of Japanese and Iranian drug dealers in October 2010, they found Komukai's name listed as a customer and in February 2011, they issued a warrant for her arrest. Komukai had left Japan by that time and was in Manila. In a February 14 interview in Manila, she denied the drug allegations, said she was "not afraid of getting arrested" and would soon be returning to Japan. Komukai was arrested for a second time on drug charges for alleged possession of methamphetamines at Tokyo's Narita International Airport when she returned from Manila on February 25, 2011. In March 2011, Komukai, who denied she was a customer of the drug gang, was released due to lack of evidence.

=== AV career ===
In October 2011 Komukai entered the adult video (AV) industry as an exclusive actress for the company Alice Japan with the video AV Actress Minako Komukai. It was reported that she was being paid 100 million yen (nearly US$1 million) for a five-film contract. Her AV debut film was a huge commercial success, selling over 200,000 copies in a field where 10,000 copies constitute a hit. In early 2012 with AV sales generally declining due to internet competition, other adult studios were also looking to sign big names from other areas of entertainment, a so-called "Minako Komukai effect." Komukai began appearing in videos for a new studio, Moodyz, in July 2014. Her first video for Moodyz, titled Anal Bukkake Fuck Now!, won the Grand Prix award and the Super Heavyweight Class First Place award at the AV Open 2014 competition in November 2014.

In February 2015, Komukai was arrested for drug possession for the third time. The arrest, made by narcotics officers at her apartment in the Ebisu, Shibuya area of Tokyo, was for 0.1 grams of methamphetamine. It was reported that Komukai admitted to the allegations. Friends said that she had seemed distracted since the November AV Open 2014 awards and had cancelled work and taken time off.

== Filmography ==
=== Theatrical Films ===
- Chain (チェーン) (2003)
- Bakuryū Sentai Abaranger Deluxe: Abare Summer Is Freezing Cold! (2003)
- The Big Slaughter Club: Growing (集団殺人クラブ GROWING, Shūdan Satsujin Kurabu: GROWING) (2004)
- Ranbu: Enbu kenshi (ＲＡＮＢＵ 艶舞剣士) (2004)
- Tenshi ga Orita Hi (天使が降りた日) (2005)
- Flower and Snake 3 (花と蛇３, Hana to hebi 3) (2010)

=== Television ===
- Danjiki: Buddhist Diet Secrets (歓迎！ダンジキ御一行様, Kangei! Danjiki Goikkosama) (2001)
- Whistle! (ホイッスル！) (2002)
- Vampire Host (2004)

=== Adult videos (AV) ===
Released	Video title	Company	Director	Notes
2010-01-07	Dangerous Stripper	SOD; SDNI-001		Non-sex video
2011-10-14 (DVD); 2011-11-11 (Blu-ray)	AV Actress Minako Komukai; AV女優 小向美奈子	Alice Japan; DV-1313 (DVD); AJBD-0004 (Blu-ray)	Ryuichi Arisugawa	AV debut
2011-12-09 (DVD); 2012-01-13 (Blu-ray)	Arousal Minako Komukai 挑発 小向美奈子	Alice Japan; DV-1336 (DVD); AJBD-0007 (Blu-ray)	Ryuichi Arisugawa	
2012-02-10 (DVD); 2012-03-09 (Blu-ray)	Infinity Minako Komukai ∞ 小向美奈子	Alice Japan; DV-1355 (DVD); AJBD-0008 (Blu-ray)	Ryuichi Arisugawa	
2012-06-22	Minako Komukai Complete 小向美奈子 コンプリート	Alice Japan; DV-1405	Ryuichi Arisugawa	Compilation of her first three videos for Alice Japan
2013-02-22 (DVD); 2013-03-22 (Blu-ray)	Minako Komukai x Alice Japan - Special Featuring Comprehensive Footage From Popular Series 小向美奈子×アリスＪＡＰＡＮ 人気シリーズ完全網羅スペシャル 小向美奈子	Alice Japan; DV-1481; AJBD-0012 (Blu-ray)	Ryuichi Arisugawa	
2013-12-13	Big Dynamite Minako Komukai 巨乳ダイナマイト 小向美奈子	Alice Japan; DV-1576	Tiger Kosakai	
2014-02-01	Beach Queen Minako Komukai; BEACH QUEEN 小向美奈子	Alice Japan; DV-1596	Zack Arai	
2014-04-11	Rape Deviation Minako Komukai レイプ狂い 小向美奈子	Alice Japan; DV-1617	Zack Arai	
2014-07-01	Anal Bukkake Fuck Now! ぶっかけ中出しアナルFUCK！	Moodyz AV Open; AVOP-009	Katsuyuki Hasegawa	Won the Grand Prix award at AV Open 2014
2014-09-01	Real Creampies At The Celebrity Soapland 芸能人真性中出しソープランド	Moodyz Gati; MIGD-606	天現寺駆	
2014-10-13	Orgasm Sex That Will Not Stop Despite 10 Ejaculations in 1 Day, Genuine Nakadashi Ver. 1日10回射精しても止まらないオーガズムSEX 真性中出しVer.	Moodyz Gati; MIGD-617	TAKE-D	
2014-12-01	Celebrity Mind Blowing Creampie Sex 理性の吹き飛んだ芸能人と中出し性交	Moodyz Gati; MIGD-622	cobo	
2015-02-13	Completely Supervised By Attackers, Violatedd Right in Front of the Husband - A Couple Weighed Down With Grief アタッカーズ完全監修 夫の目の前で犯されて― 哀しみを背負った夫婦	Moodyz Gati; MIGD-635		
2016-09-09	Big Tits Slut	CATCHEYE; DRGBD-13		Uncensored
2016-10-21	Big Tits Cream Pie Life	Samurai Porn; DSAMBD-11		Uncensored
2016-11-25	Real Deep Sex	Samurai Porn; DSAMBD-13		Uncensored
2017-01-26	Bondage Private Room	Catcheye; DRGBD-17		Uncensored
