= Nawashi =

Person who ties in Japanese rope bondage

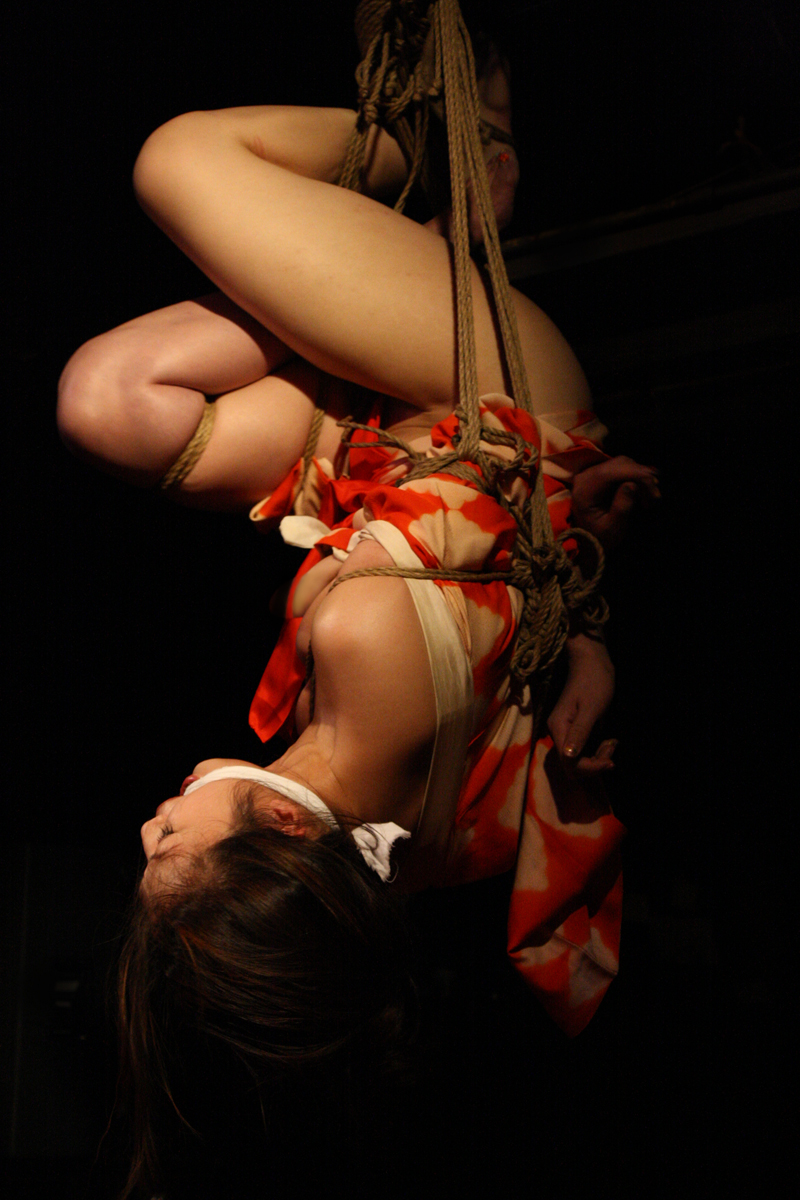
Female model Iroha Shizuki bound by kinbakushi Naka Akira in 2011

A nawashi is a person with a recognized proficiency in the historic erotic art of Japanese bondage. (Note: Nawashi (Japanese: 縄師) is a noun which means lit. 'rope master' or 'rope teacher'. Terms for Japanese bondage include 緊縛 kinbaku lit. 'tight binding' and 緊縛美 kinbaku-bi lit. 'bondage beauty'.) The word nawashi is used in SM circles to mean "rope artist".

Other terms used in Japan for rope artists within SM culture are kinbakushi and bakushi, with "bakushi" being more typical.

In early 2007 a documentary movie entitled Bakushi produced by Naoya Narita and directed by Ryūichi Hiroki was released. In it, Hiroki interviews three Japanese ropemasters (bakushi), Chimuo Nureki, Haruki Yukimura, and Go Arisue, along with three of their models, Hiromi Saotome, Sumire, and Taeko Uzuki.

Two famous nawashi are the late Osada Eikichi (2001) and Akechi Denki (2005). Other notable Japanese bakushi are Naka Akira, Haruki Yukimura, Hajime Kinoko, Randa Mai, Go Arisue, Chimuo Nureki and Chiba Eizoh. One notable female bakushi is Benio Takara.

The art of kinbaku has become more well known in the West since the mid-1990s, with a number of notable non-Japanese practitioners shaping their rope art in Japanese inspired forms.

== Glossary ==
- kinbaku (緊縛): (noun) bondage
- shibari (縛り): (verb) to tie or bind
- nawa shibari (縄縛り): (noun) rope tying
- nawashi (縄師): (noun) literally,"a maker of rope", but in SM circles in means "rope artist"
- kinbakushi (緊縛師): (noun) tight binding (bondage) master
- bakushi (縛師): (noun) abbreviated form of kinbakushi

== See also ==
- Bondage rigger
