= Calm After the Storm (disambiguation) =

"Calm After the Storm" is a song by Dutch duo The Common Linnets that represented the Netherlands at the Eurovision Song Contest 2014.

Calm After the Storm may also refer to:

- La quiete dopo la tempesta ("The quiet after the storm") poem by Giacomo Leopardi
- Calm After the Storm (EP), by Helsinki
- "Calm After the Storm", song by The Autumn Offering from 2004 album Revelations of the Unsung

== See also ==
- Calm Before the Storm (disambiguation)
