= List of Wandering Son chapters =

The cover of the first volume of the Wandering Son manga released by Enterbrain on July 25, 2003, in Japan.

The manga series Wandering Son is written and illustrated by Takako Shimura. The chapters were serialized monthly in Comic Beam from the December 2002 to August 2013 issues. The chapters were collected and published in 15 tankōbon volumes by Enterbrain from July 25, 2003, to August 28, 2013. Fantagraphics Books licensed the manga in English and began releasing the series in North America in hardcover format starting with the first volume on July 5, 2011. The series is also licensed by Ever Glory Publishing in Taiwan and by Haksan Publishing in South Korea. The story depicts a young student named Shuichi Nitori, described by the author as a boy who wants to be a girl, and Shuichi's friend Yoshino Takatsuki, described as a girl who wants to be a boy. As the two of them grow up, they worry about the bodily changes they will be going through, and try to find their own way of life.

== Volume list ==
No.	Original release date	Original ISBN	English release date	English ISBN
01	July 25, 2003	978-4-7577-1522-6	July 5, 2011	978-1-6069-9416-0
1. "The Boy Who's a Girl" (ぼくは、おんなのこ, "Boku wa, Onna no Ko"); 2. "The Wandering Son Wanders On" (放浪息子はどこまでも, "Hōrō Musuko wa Doko Made mo"); 3. "Oscar and André" (オスカルとアンドレ, "Osukaru to Andore"); 4. "Wandering Daughter" (放浪娘, "Hōrō Musume"); 5. "Nitori-kun's Birthday" (ニトリくんの誕生日, "Nitori-kun no Tanjōbi"); 6. "Friends and Their Words" (お友達のお言葉, "Otomodachi no Okotoba"); 7. "Takatsuki-san's Calamity" (高槻さんの災難, "Takatsuki-san no Sainan"); 8. "Everything I Want" (ほしいもの ぜんぶ, "Hoshii Mono Zenbu")
Shuichi Nitori is an effeminate fifth grade boy who secretly wants to be a girl. When his family moves, he transfers into a new school and quickly becomes close friends with classmate Yoshino Takatsuki, a masculine girl who wants to be a boy. Shuichi's classmate Saori Chiba encourages him to cross-dress after she sees him in a dress and headband at his home. For Shuichi's birthday, Saori gives him an expensive dress, but he eventually returns the gift; Saori burns it in front of him, which makes both of them feel bad about the incident. Over the winter break, Yoshino gets a boyish haircut and visits a neighboring town in a male school uniform, where she is mistakenly hit on by a woman. Shuichi's class decides to perform The Rose of Versailles for the graduating sixth grade students with the female roles played by male students and male roles played by female students. Yoshino gives Shuichi her older sister's old junior high female school uniform, and they plan to go together to a neighboring town posing as the opposite sex, but Yoshino gets her period. She is teased for this at school by some boys, and gets into a fight.
02	May 26, 2004	978-4-7577-1805-0	January 2, 2012	978-1-6069-9456-6
9. "Love & (Hair)piece" (ラブ&ヘアピース, "Rabu & Heapīsu"); 10. "Dreams and Desires and Stuff" (夢とか希望とか, "Yume toka Kibō toka"); 11. "An Unfortunate Boy" (かわいそうな子, "Kawaisō na Ko"); 12. "An Undaunted Girl" (こらえる少女, "Koraeru Shōjo); 13. "The Exchange Diary" (小学生日記, "Shōgakusei Nikki"); 14. "An Odd Pair" (おかしなふたり, "Okashi na Futari"); 15. "School Trip: The Day Before" (修学旅行·前夜, "Shūgakuryokō Zenya"); 16. "School Trip: Day 1" (修学旅行·1日目, "Shūgakuryokō Ichinichi Me"); 17. "School Trip: Day 2" (修学旅行·2日目, "Shūgakuryokō Futsuka Me")
Shuichi buys a girl's wig with money he receives from his grandmother. When he and Yoshino go out together in drag, they meet Yuki, the woman who hit on Yoshino. On another day, Yuki invites them to her apartment. At the start of sixth grade, Saori is the only one of Shuichi's friends to be put into another class. While at home with a slight fever, Shuichi dresses up as a girl, and he answers the door to find Riku Seya, classmate of his older sister Maho. Seya later tells Maho that he likes the girl he met at her home, not knowing it was her brother. Maho finds Shuichi's wig and takes a photo of him dressed as a girl, which she gives to Seya even though she is angry that he likes her brother and not her. Yoshino and Shuichi continue to visit Yuki's apartment, and one day Yuki's boyfriend Shiina arrives while they are there. Shiina discovers that Yoshino is a girl and Shuichi is a boy, leading them to confess the truth to Yuki, who reveals in turn that she is a transsexual woman. Yoshino and Shuichi start an exchange diary. Their friends Saori and Kanako Sasa feel left out by this and start one themselves. On a class trip to Nikkō, Shuichi is teased by another boy for being effeminate. Saori tries to stand up for him, and Shuichi later tells his teaser that he hates people like him.
03	December 25, 2004	978-4-7577-2091-6	July 16, 2012	978-1-6069-9533-4
18. "Tagging Along" (お姉ちゃんと一緒, "Onee-chan to Issho"); 19. "A Day of Much Ado" (めまぐるしい日, "Memagurushii Hi"); 20. "Half-Crazed" (半狂乱, "Hankyōran"); 21. "A New Friend" (新しいお友達, "Atarashii Otomodachi"); 22. "Sunday Date" (日曜日はデート, "Nichiyōbi wa Dēto"); 23. "Takatsuki Yoshino's Big Decision" (タカツキヨシノサンノケツイ, "Takatsuki Yoshino-san no Ketsui"); 24. "Stranger and Stranger" (どんどん変に......, "Dondon Hen ni......"); 25. "A Song for Everyone" (みんなのうた, "Minna no Uta")
Maho and Shuichi are hired by a modeling agency after Maho says during the audition that if she is chosen, then her brother has to be too. Shuichi discovers Saori has been taking lessons in the nurse's office. Maho sets up a meeting between Seya and Shuichi. Shuichi and Yoshino's exchange diary is read in front of many other students, prompting Yoshino to fight back by ripping the diary. She later comes to school wearing a skirt and gets angry at Saori for butting into hers and Shuichi's problem. Shuichi meets a boy from another class named Makoto Ariga, who visits Shuichi's home to see her collection of girl's clothes and reveals that she too is a transgender girl. Maho sets up Seya on a date with Shuichi, who agrees to go on as a girl, but she takes along Makoto, who is also dressed like a girl. While at the aquarium, Shuichi tells Seya that she is actually Maho's younger brother and that Maho likes Seya. Yoshino spends the night at Yuki's, who helps her come to terms with herself. Yoshino decides that she is going to wear the clothes she wants and that she will make up with Shuichi and Saori. At the modeling agency, some girls dress Shuichi in girl's clothing, and another model, Anna Suehiro, thinks she is a freak for enjoying it. Yoshino finally makes up with her friends and relations return to normal. At the modeling agency, Maho tries to stand up for Shuichi but it backfires slightly, which causes Shuichi to speak up against the other models. Maiko, a popular model that Maho admires, arrives and wonders what is going on.
04	August 31, 2005	978-4-7577-2402-0	June 15, 2013	978-1-6069-9605-8
26. "Sister's Love" (おねえちゃんの恋, "Onee-chan no Koi"); 27. "Grieving Young Princess" (嘆きの姫君, "Nageki no Himegimi"); 28. "Romantic Elopement" (ロマンティック逃避行, "Romantikku Tōhikō"); 29. "Kiss Riot" (キス騒動, "Kisu Sōdō"); 30. "Even Though It's Not Even Spring" (春でもないのに, "Haru de mo Nai no ni"); 31. "Confession" (告白, "Kokuhaku"); 32. "Riven Again" (亀裂ふたたび, "Kiretsu Futatabi"); 33. "Ah, Junior High Students" (ああ、中学生, "Aa, Chūgakusei")
Maho realizes she may be in love with Seya, and she later becomes friends with Anna. Shuichi quits modeling and starts showing some frustration with her sister's attitude towards him, especially in regards to her status as a model. Shuichi decides to run away from home, and takes the bus to a zoo, but returns home the same day, realizing the futility of the venture. When a classmate, Takanori Oda, thinks he sees Shuichi and Yoshino kissing at school, it starts a frenzy among the students. Saori later forces Takanori to tell the truth and tells him that she loves Shuichi. Saori continues to go to church, where she meets Fumiya Ninomiya. Shuichi tells Yoshino that she wants to stop the exchange diary, which leads him to confess that she likes her. Maho confesses to Seya that she is in love with him. When Shuichi visits Saori's home, she tells her she loves her, and Shuichi tells her he confessed to Yoshino, but was turned down; Saori and Yoshino get in a fight over this. Yoshino writes a letter to Shuichi, telling her she cannot reciprocate her feelings as she does not understand what love is yet. Shuichi's circle of friends breaks apart, and as time goes on, they enter junior high school.
05	June 26, 2006	978-4-7577-2825-7	November 2, 2013	978-1-6069-9647-8
34. "The Mysterious Sarashina-san" (不思議な更科さん, "Fushigi na Sarashina-san"); 35. "Refreshing Class 3" (さわやか3組, "Sawayaka Sangumi"); 36. "Class Getting Along" (なかよし学級, "Nakayoshi Gakkyū"); 37. "Beautiful Monday" (ビューティフルマンデー, "Byūtifuru Mandē"); 38. "Teacher Loves Mystery" (先生はミステリーがお好き, "Sensei wa Misuterī ga Osuki"); 39. "Girl Rehearsal Practice" (女の子予行演習, "Onna no Ko Yokōenshū"); 40. "The Door into Summer" (夏への扉, "Natsu e no Tobira"); 41. "Revival" (再燃, "Sainen")
As Shuichi and the others begin junior high school, they find that Sasa, Saori, Yoshino and Makoto are all in the same class as Shuichi. They meet a strange classmate named Chizuru Sarashina, and Shuichi and Yoshino are instantly captivated by her. Saori quickly butts heads with Momoko Shirai, Chizuru's friend, who is jealous of Chizuru paying attention to anyone else. Yoshino joins the basketball club with Chizuru, and the drama club decides to put on a play where the gender roles are reversed. Shuichi's homeroom teacher, Manabu Saisho, proposes doing something similar to his students, who like the idea. Finally, Yoshino and Saori rejoin Shuichi's group of friends, though Saori says she still hates Yoshino and Momoko. Shuichi and Saori separately write scripts for their class play, then together write a story taking elements from both drafts; the result is a modern retelling of Romeo and Juliet where Romeo is a transgender boy and Juliet is a transgender girl. Yoshino is mortified when her basketball coach tells her to buy a bra, not wanting to admit that her breasts are growing. Yoshino tells Shuichi that she wishes she had a flat chest like her, and Shuichi tells her that she is jealous of Yoshino for having been born a girl. Another day, Saori asks Shuichi whether she likes Yoshino as a boy or as a girl.
06	February 26, 2007	978-4-7577-3352-7	January 18, 2014	978-1-6069-9707-9
42. "The Beginning of Summer Vacation" (夏休みのはじまり, "Natsuyasumi no Hajimari"); 43. "Around the Middle of Summer Vacation" (夏休みのなかごろ, "Natsuyasumi no Nakagoro"); 44. "The End of Summer Vacation" (夏休みのおわり, "Natsuyasumi no Owari"); 45. "Preparations for the Banquet" (1) (宴の支度(1), "Utage no Shitaku" (1)); 46. "Preparations for the Banquet" (2) (宴の支度(2), "Utage no Shitaku" (2)); 47. "Preparations for the Banquet" (3) (宴の支度(3), "Utage no Shitaku" (3)); 48. "It's the Festival! Everyone Assemble!!" (first part) (お祭りだよ! 全員集合!!(前編), "Omatsuri da yo! Zen'in Shūgō!!" (zenpen)); 49. "It's the Festival! Everyone Assemble!!" (last part) (お祭りだよ! 全員集合!!(後編), "Omatsuri da yo! Zen'in Shūgō!!" (kōhen))
Shuichi's class makes special invitations for the cultural festival, and give them to their friends and family during summer vacation. Maho is forced by her father to bring Shuichi along to the beach with Seya, and Shuichi spends some time alone with a flower in her hair, playing like a girl. When school starts in the fall, the roles for Romeo and Juliet are decided by drawing lots, and while Saori gets Romeo like she wanted, Makoto ends up being Juliet; Shuichi gets the part of the narrator. One day after school, Yoshino invites Shuichi to once again go out. Shuichi becomes curious about cute bras and panties, and decides to try on a pair of her sister's. Although she washes them afterwards and returns them to her drawer, Maho notices they were moved and accuses her of wearing them, despite Shuichi's denials; Maho throws them away afterwards. Maiko comes to the cultural festival with Maho, but is hounded by fans who recognize her, causing her to leave early. The class play goes well.
07	December 25, 2007	978-4-7577-3928-4	July 31, 2014	978-1-6069-9750-5
50. "Mako's Feelings" (マコのきもち, "Mako no Kimochi"); 51. "A Maiden's Wish" (乙女の祈り, "Otome no Inori"); 52. "Yoshino's Pleasant Prayer" (よしのはご機嫌ななめ, "Yoshino wa Gokigen na Name"); 53. "Secretive Nitori-kun" (ひみつのにとりくん, "Himitsu no Nitori-kun"); 54. "Ripple" (波紋, "Hamon"); 55. "Clear Up the Snow?" (雪解け?, "Yukidoke?"); 56. "Go Skiing With Me" (first part) (私をスキーに連れてって(前編), "Watashi o Sukī ni Tsuretette" (zenpen)); 57. "Go Skiing With Me" (last part) (私をスキーに連れてって(後編), "Watashi o Sukī ni Tsuretette" (kōhen))
Shuichi gets her first pimple, and uses some of her sister's face wash, but another one soon appears. She gets Anna to help choose another face wash, and the pimples soon disappear. The drama club recruits Shuichi and Saori for their work on Romeo and Juliet, and Saori quits the volleyball club to join; Shuichi also joins. Shuichi asks Anna out, and the two start dating, though Shuichi does not tell anyone at first. Shuichi and Yoshino go over to Yuki's again, where Shuichi reveals that she is dating Anna. This surprises Yoshino, who suggests she and Shuichi stop going out together, since Anna would not like it. Yoshino tells Saori that Shuichi and Anna are going out, though Yoshino regrets it as Saori stops going to school. Yoshino visits Saori's house everyday to give her class handouts, and the two gradually repair their friendship. A school ski trip comes up, and Yoshino persuades Saori to go. On the trip, Shuichi catches a cold and has to rest in a room with Seya and another boy, both also sick. Yoshino tells Saori that she still wants to be a boy.
08	October 25, 2008	978-4-7577-4499-8	June 7, 2015	978-1-6069-9831-1
58. "Spring" (春, "Haru"); 59. "The Opposite of Like" (スキの反対, "Suki no Hantai"); 60. "Sister Approval" (おねえちゃん検定, "Onee-chan Kentei"); 61. "Swaying" (ゆれる, "Yureru"); 62. "Singing Spirit" (うた魂, "Uta Tamashii"); 63. "The Morning of Setting Off" (旅立ちの朝, "Tabidachi no Asa"); 64. "Weir" (堰, "Seki"); 65. "Break Down" (決壊, "Kekkai")
Shuichi and her friends start their second year as junior high students, but everyone is split up between several classes. Anna tells Shuichi that she is an interesting person. Shinpei Doi, Shuichi's classmate, sees her coming out of a restaurant with Yuki and his opinion of Shuichi changes; Doi wants to finally become friends with her. Anna and Shuichi, presenting as a girl, go out on a date, and run into Yoshino and Saori in a restaurant. The four go to a karaoke bar and have fun, though not without some tension between Saori and Anna. Yoshino decides to go to school in a boys uniform, and garners some attention from the teachers and other students. Doi contacts Shuichi, saying he wants to meet Yuki, so Shuichi goes with Yoshino and Doi to Yuki's place, who introduces herself as a transvestite living with a man (Shiina). Doi is surprised about Yuki, and even gets Shuichi to dress up like a girl in front of him. Doi suggests to Shuichi that she come to school dressed as a girl, since even Yoshino is dressing like a boy now. Shuichi thinks about this deeply, and even consults Chizuru and Yoshino about it. In the end, Shuichi knows she has to be the one to decide, and she comes to school wearing a wig and the old female school uniform Yoshino gave him. Everyone is surprised about this turn of events, and Shuichi is soon taken home early by her mother.
09	July 25, 2009	978-4-7577-4995-5	—	—
66. "Long Day" (長い一日, "Nagai Ichinichi"); 67. "Too Late" (あとのまつり, "Ato no Matsuri"); 68. "A License for Kindness" (やさしさライセンス, "Yasashisa Raisensu"); 69. "Puberty" (思春期, "Shishunki"); 70. "Catch Me If You Can" (手のなるほうへ, "Te no Naru Hō e"); 71. "Going Around in Circles" (どうどうめぐり, "Dōdō Meguri"); 72. "Flood of Visitors" (千客万来, "Senkyakubanrai"); 73. "Transient Boys and Girls" (放浪少年少女, "Hōrō Shōnen Shōjo")
Shuichi's parents become concerned about her going to school dressed as a girl, and Maho stays home from school, fearing ridicule from her sister's actions. While skipping school, Seya accompanies Shuichi to Yuki's apartment; they tell her what happened, and how Shuichi became discouraged because those at school laughed at her whereas they did not laugh at either Chizuru or Yoshino for dressing like boys. Shuichi's friends visit her at home one at a time, and she meets Fumiya Ninomiya when she accompanies Saori to church. Shuichi finally goes to school again, but goes to the nurse's office immediately after arriving. Maho starts going to school again, and Seya tells her he will protect her from any bullying. Shuichi starts leaving very early in the morning, going off near the river or just walking around while skipping school. A boy from another class confesses to Yoshino that he likes her, but she just finds this annoying. Anna seeks advice from Maiko, since she is confused about her relationship with Shuichi after she came to school dressed as a girl. Fumiya meets Shuichi before school, and takes her to the church where Shuichi makes it clear that she is a transgender girl, not just a cross-dressing. Chizuru and Momoko get in a fight due in part to Momoko's comments about Shuichi's choice to wear a female uniform. Shuichi's friends are worried about her not coming to school, and Yoshino and Saori find her still in the church with Fumiya. At Yuki's, she recounts some of her memories to Shuichi, while Shiina tells some of his past to Yoshino, Saori, and Fumiya.
10	March 25, 2010	978-4-0472-6412-0	—	—
74. "The First Step" (はじめの一歩, "Hajime no Ippo"); 75. "Summer Vacation (なつやすみ, "Natsuyasumi"); 76. "Grate" (軋み, "Kishimi"); 77. "Ripple" (波紋, "Hamon"); 78. "Mako's Love" (マコの恋, "Mako no Koi"); 79. "Doi-kun" (土居くん); 80. "Plus Minus" (プラス マイナス, "Purasu Mainasu"); 81. "Glass Generation" (ガラスのジェネレーション, "Garasu no Jenerēshon"); 82. "Love Me, Please Love Me"
While out together dressed as girls, Shuichi reveals to Fumiya that Anna broke up with her. Shuichi starts going to school regularly but still takes her lessons in the nurse's office. By the time summer vacation is about to start, Shuichi has grown her hair out enough to cover her ears. After getting an honest opinion from Saori, Yoshino once again gets her hair cut to a short, boyish style. Shuichi and Maho visit both sides of their family's grandparents during summer. When school starts again, Shuichi's class decides to put on another play for the cultural festival which will reverse the gender roles; Shuichi is writing an original script and she is chosen to be the director as well. Shinpei Doi again tries to be friendly with Shuichi, though Shuichi is suspicious of him and even tells Doi she hates him. Makoto thinks she may have fallen in love with Shuichi. Doi proves himself as a good writer, and Shuichi asks him for help on the script for the play, and in the process, Doi convinces Shuichi to begin attending class regularly again. Preparations for the festival continue and Shuichi becomes fearful of further physical changes to her body. With the festival in full swing, Shuichi's class gets ready to perform their play, The Boy Who's a Girl. Anna inadvertently runs into Shuichi at the school festival after coming with Maiko and Tamaki Satō. Anna apologizes to Shuichi for what she said when they broke up and Shuichi affirms that she still likes her.
11	December 24, 2010	978-4-0472-6940-8	—	—
83. "First Storm of Spring" (春一番, "Haruichiban"); 84. "Sprout" (萌芽, "Hōga"); 85. "Passing By" (すれちがい, "Surechigai"); 86. "A Field Trip for Everyone" 1 (みんなの修学旅行・1, "Minna no Shūgaku Ryokō" 1); 87. "A Field Trip for Everyone" 2 (みんなの修学旅行・2, "Minna no Shūgaku Ryokō" 2); 88. "Everyone's Future Wishes" (みんなの進路希望, "Minna no Shinro Kibō"); 89. "To Each Their Own" (それぞれの, "Sorezore no"); 90. "Stylish Connections" (おしゃれカンケイ, "Oshare Kankei"); 91. "An Exciting Idea" (高鳴るアイデア, "Takanaru Aidea")
Shuichi and her friends start their last year as junior high students, and this time Yoshino, Saori and Doi are in the same class as Shuichi. Shuichi's and Maho's room is divided with a curtain partition, because Maho has now started high school and needs the privacy. Shuichi's friends meet up at a karaoke bar, but Shuichi does not come because her voice is starting to change. Makoto tells Saori that she likes Shuichi, and Saori says that she only likes Shuichi as a friend now. Shuichi gets her hair cut very short after seeing in a magazine that Maiko cut her hair short. Chizuru and Momoko finally make up, though Momoko still cannot get along with Saori. Shuichi and the other third-years go on a school trip to Kyoto and Nara, and Shiina and Yuki go on a trip there too. After the trip, Shuichi and her friends think about their future high school plans. Shuichi's class has to do a fashion show for the cultural festival after losing a drawing to Chizuru's class, which will do a haunted house. Shuichi is shocked to hear from Saori that she thinks Yoshino likes their teacher Mr. Kaneda. Shuichi and Yoshino decide to model female clothes for the fashion show, and Maho and Seya go see it.
12	September 24, 2011	978-4-04-727529-4	—	—
92. "Kindred Spirit" (心の友, "Kokoro no Tomo"); 93. "On a Holy Night" (聖なる夜に, "Seinaru Yoru ni"); 94. "Season of the Cherry Blossoms" (桜の季節, "Sakura no Kisetsu"); 95. "Spring Still Isn't Here?" (春はまだか, "Haru wa Mada ka"); 96. "Tyltyl and Mytyl" (チルチルミチル, "Chiruchiru Michiru"); 97. "A New World" (新世界, "Shin Sekai"); 98. "Debut" (デビュー, "Debyū"); 99. "Bewildered" (五里霧中, "Gorimuchū")
During the fashion show, Shuichi and Yoshino go out on stage together holding hands; the show goes well. As Christmas draws near, everyone spends time with friends and family, and by this time, Shuichi and Anna are going out again. Shuichi helps Maho make chocolate to give to Seya for Valentine's Day. Shuichi makes a small chocolate cake, which she gives to Anna, and in return, Anna gives her a ring; Anna owns an identical ring. Shuichi and her friends take their high school entrance exams. Shuichi fails the exam to the school Yoshino and Saori get into, and dyes her hair red. Shuichi gets into the same all-boy high school as Makoto and Doi. Saori starts dating Fumiya. Shuichi gets a part-time job working as a waitress in a small cafe, and later reveals to the owner that she is transgender.
13	May 25, 2012	978-4-04-728068-7	—	—
100. "Spiral Outline" (らせんの素描, "Rasen no Sobyō"); 101. "The Calm Before the Storm" (嵐の前の静けさ, "Arashi no Mae no Shizukesa"); 102. "Superficial Knowledge" (一知半解, "Itchi Hankai"); 103. "Mii-tan's Father" 1 (みいたんのおとうさん・1, "Mii-tan no Otōsan" 1); 104. "Mii-tan's Father" 2 (みいたんのおとうさん・2, "Mii-tan no Otōsan" 2); 105. "Mind Game" (マインドゲーム, "Maindo Gēmu"); 106. "Things That I Whisper" (ささめきこと, "Sasameki Koto"); 107. "Positive Dance" (ポジティブダンス, "Pojitibu Dansu")
Shuichi runs into Minamoto, an old classmate from elementary school, and mentions where she works. Later, Minamoto drops by the cafe with a couple of her friends, with Shuichi dressed as a waiter. Shuichi dresses as a waitress another day when Minamoto and her friends return, and one of the girls, Jogasaki, recognizes Shuichi. Jogasaki meets with Shuichi and wants to ask her questions regarding her fashion choices for a novel Jogasaki is writing. Shuichi and Jogasaki meet a cross-dressing man, Taiichirō Ebina, with a young daughter, Midori. Taiichirō later contacts Shuichi and the two decide to meet again. Shuichi tells Jogasaki that she does not want to be a research subject anymore, much to the girl's annoyance. Shuichi gets time off from working at the cafe, and thanks to Shuichi, Jogasaki gets a job at the cafe as a waitress. Yoshino gets a business card from a modeling agency, and she asks Anna for advice; Anna suggests she come to her modeling agency instead. Yoshino later meets the president of Anna's modeling agency, who tells her she should show off her body more.
14	February 25, 2013	978-4-04-728696-2	—	—
108. "Dizzy Girl" (フラフラガール, "Furafura Gāru"); 109. "Growing Up" (グローイング・アップ, "Gurōingu Appu"); 110. "Unbalanced" (アンバランス, "Anbaransu"); 111. "Sprout" (めばえ, "Mebae"); 112. "Mako's Adventure" (マコの冒険, "Mako no Bōken"); 113. "Steadfast Mako" (しっかりマコ, "Shikkari Mako"); 114. "The Enjoyment of Delicacy" (デリケートに好きして, "Derikēto ni Suki Shite"); 115. "Love, Excitement and a Kiss" (スキトキメキトキス, "Suki Tokimeki to Kisu")
Shuichi and Makoto go to the aquarium with Yoshino and Saori. Yoshino tells Shuichi and Saori that recently she does not dislike the thought of wearing skirts. Shuichi goes back to the cafe after a little while to find that the owner's grandfather has died. Yoshino passes a modeling audition and starts working at Anna's modeling agency. Anna is unsure about her relationship with Shuichi, and gets jealous when Shuichi compliments other girls. Makoto goes out dressed as a girl by herself for the first time and runs away when Oka spots him in a restaurant. Makoto takes a short break from school shortly before the summer break, and later comes out to her mother as a transgender girl. Shuichi is unsure if she and Anna should still be dating since Anna is more in the public eye now, but when she is walking her home after work, they kiss. Saori goes with Makoto to see Yuki about possibly starting to work at her bar.
15	August 28, 2013	978-4-04-729101-0	—	—
116. "Heart Pattern" (心もよう, "Kokoro Moyō"); 117. "Diary of the Future" (未来日記, "Mirai Nikki"); 118. "Snowdrop" (スノードロップ, "Sunōdoroppu"); 119. "A Dreaming Girl" (夢見る女の子, "Yumemiru Onna no Ko"); 120. "The First Voice" (はじめての声, "Hajimete no Koe"); 121. "Awakening of Love" (恋心, "Koigokoro"); 122. "My Life in Pink" (ぼくのバラ色の人生, "Boku no Barairo no Jinsei"); 123. "For You"
Sasa confesses to Sasaki that she likes him over the phone. Yoshino realizes that recently she has not been thinking about wanting to be a boy anymore. Per Maho's suggestion, Shuichi starts going on dates with Anna dressed as a girl. Shuichi realizes she is becoming more masculine, and is jealous of Yoshino's beauty. Shuichi starts to wonder if she, too, will give up her transgender identity. Shuichi starts meeting with Jogasaki again, and she ends up posting pictures of Shuichi dressed in female clothing on her blog, though Shuichi tells Jogasaki it does not bother her. Shortly afterward, Shuichi quits working at the cafe. She then decides to write a semi-autobiographical novel, and shows it to Doi to get his opinion. After not being able to see Shuichi much, Yoshino starts to feel lonely and realizes that she likes her. Yoshino later tells Shuichi that she does not want to be a boy anymore, and she confesses to her that she likes her. Shuichi helps out at a bar run by one of Yuki's friends to help her write her novel. Shuichi later shows Anna the novel, who becomes distressed that reading it made her feel like Shuichi was going to die soon. As graduation draws near for Shuichi and her friends, they come together for a class reunion. Yoshino still continues to model and is losing weight to get ready for a show. Shuichi tells Anna that she wants to medically transition, and Anna stays with her. After graduation, Shuichi moves out and goes to the same college as Doi. Shuichi continues to write the novel which she titles The Boy Who's a Girl.
