= Daisuke Higuchi =

Japanese manga artist (born 1966)

Daisuke Higuchi (樋口 大輔, Higuchi Daisuke; born May 10, 1966) is a Japanese manga artist best known for her work on Whistle!. Often she is mistaken for a man, namely because Daisuke is a name usually attributed to men.

Her self-portrait in Whistle! took the form of a crow.

== History ==
Born in Gunma prefecture, she was recognized in the world of manga by being honored at the 43rd Osamu Tezuka awards in 1992 with third prize. In the same year, she became the author of a romance/action story called Itaru. In 1998, she became known in Japan for her soccer manga Whistle! and was said to be influenced after she went to France to attend the 1998 World Cup tournament.

With the success of Whistle!, she went to personally direct the creation of the animated series. She currently lives in Tokyo.

== Works ==
=== Manga ===
- 1992 - Itaru - short story
- 1992 - Singing Flame - short story
- 1994 - X-Connection - short story
- 1997 - Break Free! - short story
- 1998~2002 - Whistle! - series of 24 books
- 2001 - X-Connection 2001 - short story
- 2004 - NOIZ - short story
- 2005~2006 - Go Ahead - series of 4 books
- 2008 - Seirei Gakusha Kidan Reikyou Kaden (精霊学者綺談 黎鏡花伝), serialized in Kadokawa Shoten's Beans Ace - 2 vol.
- 2009–present - Dokushi (ドクシ -読師-), serialized in Comic Birz - 3 vol.
- 2012 - Sengoku Basara 3 - Kishin no Gotoku
- 2013 - Akashiya Ginga Shoutengai
- 2016 - Whistle! W - sequel to Whistle! - Finished in 5 Volumes as of 2020

=== Anime ===
- 2002 - Whistle! (As Original Creator)
- The short stories collection Break Free! includes a story starring characters from Whistle! Two of the other stories are alternate versions of the one plot with the same characters.
