= List of Full Metal Panic! chapters =

Cover of the first Full Metal Panic! manga volume written by Retsu Tateo.

The light novel series Full Metal Panic! by Shoji Gatoh was adapted into Japanese manga on several occasions. The first series, entitled Full Metal Panic!, was serialized in Kadokawa Shoten's magazine Monthly Comic Dragon by Retsu Tateo. All the adaptations focus on the paramilitary counter-terrorist force Mithril's Sergeant Sousuke Sagara, who arrives to the Jindai High School. There, he is assigned to protect the high school student, Kaname Chidori, while also acting as a student. Bodyguarding Chidori, Sousuke starts having social interactions for the first time in his life, but sometimes he is also assigned to do missions for Mithril.

The first Full Metal Panic! manga was collected in nine tankōbon volumes published from August 30, 2000, to June 29, 2005. Full Metal Panic! was one of the first manga licensed by ADV Manga, being announced in July 2003. They released all of its volumes from November 10, 2003 to April 11, 2006. A parallel series, entitled Full Metal Panic! Comic Mission (フルメタル・パニック! Comic Mission), was also illustrated by Retsu Tateo and is a reorganisation of the chapters from the first manga series. Seven volumes were published from November 1, 2003, to September 1, 2006.

Another spin-off series is Full Metal Panic! Overload! (いきなり! フルメタル・パニック!, Ikinari! Furumetaru Panikku!) by Tomohiro Nagai. It was released in five volumes from January 30, 2001, to April 1, 2003. Overload! was licensed by ADV Manga in December 2004, and all of its volumes were published in English from June 6, 2005, to May 24, 2006. Nagai also wrote Full Metal Panic! Surplus (フルメタル・パニック!SURPLUS) which is a single tankōbon manga published on June 27, 2003, focused more on the action elements from the franchise. The sequel of the first manga series, Full Metal Panic! Sigma (フルメタル・パニック!Σ), was illustrated by Hiroshi Ueda and focuses on the missions of Sousuke as a sergeant. It has been published in nineteen volumes, with the first volume published on August 1, 2005, and the last volume published on September 20, 2013. Its events are based on the fourth Full Metal Panic! light novel onwards.

== Volume list ==
=== Full Metal Panic! ===
No.	Original release date	Original ISBN	English release date	English ISBN
1	August 30, 2000	4-04-926157-X	November 10, 2003	978-1413900019
Mission 001. "The Transfer Student is a Dangerous Soldier?!"; Mission 002. "An Absolute Must! Protect Kaname's Secret!!"; Mission 003. "First Time Going Out, Assassin and 100 People as Opponents!?"; Mission 004. "Bullet and Bread (Bread & Bullet)"; Mission 005. "Nightmare's Signs"; Mission 006. "Kaname's ordeals! High School Battle Price Crisis-Hair"; Mission 007. "Comrade Raids!? An Afternoon Misunderstanding"
2	March 28, 2001	4-04-926170-7	December 29, 2003	978-1413900064
Mission 008. "Inminent?! The Summer Trip from the Students!"; Mission 009. "The Dangerous Call!"; Mission 010. "The Mission Begins!"; Mission 011. "Slow Night"; Mission 012. "With the Eye on the Firmament"; Mission 013. "Accepting the ""Volition" from a Messenger"; Mission 014. "The Great Escape!"
3	December 21, 2001	4-04-926189-8	February 17, 2004	978-1413900071
Mission 015. "Pressure, Problems at the Tournament?"; Mission 016. "Who is the Transfer Student!?"; Mission 017. "Are The Two Under the Same Ceiling?!"; Mission 018. "Strange Animals in The Army"; Mission 019. "Vacations' Romance"; Mission 020. "I'm Not Afraid of Ghosts! A Scary Adventure on a Desertic Island!!
4	April 26, 2002	4-04-926195-2	April 6, 2004	978-1413900392
Mission 021. "Too Many Memories! Sousuke Being Defeated?! (Part 1)"; Mission 022. "Too Many Memories! Sousuke Being Defeated?! (Part 2)"; Mission 023. "Surprise! Who Could It Be?!"; Mission 024. "Nothing Can Stop the Captain's Tears?!"; Mission 025. "Sousuke's Decision"; Mission 026. "I Hope You're All Right, Sousuke"
5	November 28, 2002	4-04-926212-6	July 6, 2004	978-1413900514
Mission 027. "Rescuing the Two Beautiful Girls!"; Mission 028. "A Place For Takuma"; Mission 029. "Last Wish"; Mission 030. "The Battle's End"; Mission 031. "Sweet Memories"; Mission 032. "The Long Road to the Vacation House"; Special Project. "Taiwan Manga Exclusive Report"
6	June 27, 2003	4-04-926228-2	November 16, 2004	978-1413901986
Mission 033. "The Art of War"; Mission 034. "The Food is Sacred, to Make it in Hell..."; Mission 035. "A Christmas Battlefield?!"; Mission 036. "Sousuke, New Years and New Perspectives"; Mission 037. "Classical Jumping Notes"; Mission 038. "A Mystery Message, A Mercenary With Problems"; Mission 039. "Special Ordinary Days"
7	February 26, 2004	4-04-926242-8	January 25, 2005	978-1413902006
Mission 040. "Beware of Mouse Burglars!"; Mission 041. "Sergeant Sousuke Has a Secret Place?!"; Mission 042. "We Are in the Water, Guys!"; Mission 043. "This is How You Negotiate?!"; Mission 044. "Emotioned by a Simple Dream?!"; Mission 045. "Her Grandfather is a First Lieutenant?!"; Extra Mission. "What Comes From Acting Brave"
8	August 30, 2004	4-04-926248-7	July 26, 2005	978-1413903225
Mission 046. "An Invitation to Summer - Kaname's Fateful Feeling?! "; Mission 047. "Party de Danaan"; Mission 048. "Pressures and Promises"; Mission 049. "The Demon that Lurks on the Battlefield"; Mission 050. "The Arbalest in Error"; Mission 051. "A World in Which I Don't Belong"
9	June 29, 2005	4-04-926256-8	April 11, 2006	978-1413903386
Mission 052. "Shared Thoughts and a Dangerous Gamble"; Mission 053. "Into the Blue Sea"; Mission 054. "One From the Heart"; Mission 055. "Counterattack"; Mission 056. "Showdown"; Mission 057. "Clear and Present Danger"; Last Mission. "Endless Summer"

=== Full Metal Panic! Overload! ===
No.	Original release date	Original ISBN	English release date	English ISBN
1	January 30, 2001	4-04-712262-9	June 6, 2005	978-1413903157
Bomb 001. "He Enters With a Bang"; Bomb 002. "First Period Crazy"; Bomb 003. "Like Using a Study Room"; Bomb 004. "With Sousuke"; Bomb 005. "The Joke in the Pool"; Bomb 006. "A Crazy War and a Crazy Festival"
2	June 28, 2001	4-04-712273-4	October 19, 2005	978-1413903263
Bomb 007. "The Pimp Soldier Attacks!!"; Bomb 008. "Requiem For the Sick"; Bomb 009. "Crisis in New Year!!"; Bomb 010. "San Valentine's Day and the Sound of the Bells"; Bomb 011. "Full Metal Panic!!"; Bomb 012. "Flowers and Graves"
3	December 21, 2001	4-04-712290-4	January 25, 2006	978-1413903317
Bomb 013. "Silent Battle"; Bomb 014. "Teach us, Eri-san!"; Bomb 015. "Searching for Parcial Time"; Bomb 016. "Forbidden Elegy"; Bomb 017. "Summer All Red"; Bomb 018. "Panic Game"
4	April 26, 2002	4-04-712299-8	April 19, 2006	978-1413903409
Bomb 019. "Danger, Storm: Be Careful With Water and Explosions"; Bomb 020. "New Year Battle"; Bomb 021. "Touch and See!"; Bomb 022. "Commercial District Paranoia"; Bomb 023. "War Father-Daughter"; "Bonus: Tessa"
5	April 1, 2003	4-04-712325-0	May 24, 2006	978-1413903423
Bomb 024. "An Indulgent Free Day"; Bomb 025. "Love Battle: Kyochin My Love"; Bomb 026. "Weight! Red Condition!"; Bomb 027. "A Small Sound on the Move"; Bomb 028. "Infiltration! Full Metal Panic!"; "Final Bomb: The Bombs' Sounds is For Them"; "Bonus: Tessa"

=== Full Metal Panic! Surplus ===
No.	Japanese release date	Japanese ISBN
1	June 27, 2003	4-04-712334-X
1. "Load"; 2. "Hammer"; 3. "Trigger"; 4. "Fire"

=== Full Metal Panic! Comic Mission ===
No.	Title	Japanese release date	Japanese ISBN
1	放っておけない一匹狼？	October 30, 2003	4-04-712345-5
Mission 01. "The Transfer Student is a Dangerous Soldier?!"; Mission 02. "An Absolute Must! Protect Kaname's Secret!!"; Mission 03. "The Art of War"; Mission 04. "A Mystery Message, A Mercenary With Problems"; Mission 05. "Sweet Memories"; Extra Mission. "Cinderella Panic"
2	戦うボーイ・ミーツ・ガール	April 27, 2004	4-04-712355-2
Mission 01. "Nightmare's Signs"; Mission 02. "Kaname's ordeals! High School Battle Price Crisis-Hair"; Mission 03. "Comrade Raids!? An Afternoon Misunderstanding"; Mission 04. "Inminent?! The Summer Trip from the Students!"; Mission 05. "The Dangerous Call!"; Mission 06. "The Mission Begins!"; Mission 07. "Slow Night"; Mission 08. "With the Eye on the Firmament"; Mission 09. "Accepting the ""Volition" from a Messenger"; Mission 10. "The Great Escape!"; Extra Mission. "unknown"
3	あとに退けない二者択一？	December 22, 2004	4-04-712383-8
Mission 01. "Who is the Transfer Student!?"; Mission 02. "Are The Two Under the Same Ceiling?!"; Mission 03. "Strange Animals in The Army"; Mission 04. "The Long Way Home From Vacations"; Mission 05. "The Food is Sacred, to Make it in Hell..."; Mission 06. "A Christmas Battlefield?!"; Mission 07. "Special Ordinary Days"
4	振り逃げできない三者凡退？	May 30, 2005	4-04-712402-8
Mission 01. "First Time Going Out, Assassin and 100 People as Opponents!?"; Mission 02. "I'm Not Afraid of Ghosts! A Scary Adventure on a Desertic Island!!"; Mission 03. "Sousuke, New Years and New Perspectives"; Mission 04. "Beware of Mouse Burglars!"; Mission 05. "Sergeant Sousuke Has a Secret Place?!"; Mission 06. "We Are in the Water, Guys!"; Extra Mission. "unknown"
5	例外だらけの四角四面？	May 30, 2006	4-04-712452-4
Mission 01. "Bullet and Bread (Bread & Bullet)"; Mission 02. "Pressure, Problems at the Tournament?"; Mission 03. "Vacations' Romance"; Mission 04. "Too Many Memories! Sousuke Being Defeated?! (Part 1)"; Mission 05. "Too Many Memories! Sousuke Being Defeated?! (Part 2)"; Mission 06. "This is How You Negotiate?!"; Mission 07. "unknown"
6	疾るワン・ナイト・スタンド	July 27, 2006	4-04-712459-1
Mission 01. "Surprise! Who Could It Be?!"; Mission 02. "Nothing Can Stop the Captain's Tears?!"; Mission 03. "Sousuke's Decision"; Mission 04. "I Hope You're All Right, Sousuke"; Mission 05. "Rescuing the Two Beautiful Girls!"; Mission 06. "A Place For Takuma"; Mission 07. "Last Wish"; Mission 08. "The Battle's End"
7	揺れるイントゥ・ザ・ブルー	August 29, 2006	4-04-712461-3
Mission 01. "An Invitation to Summer - Kaname's Fateful Feeling?!"; Mission 02. "Party de Danaan"; Mission 03. "Pressures and Promises"; Mission 04. "The Demon that Lurks on the Battlefield"; Mission 05. "The Arbalest in Error"; Mission 06. "A World in Which I Don't Belong"; Mission 07. "Shared Thoughts and a Dangerous Gamble"; Mission 08. "Into the Blue Sea"; Mission 09. "One From the Heart"; Mission 10. "Counterattack"; Mission 11. "Showdown"; Mission 12. "Clear and Present Danger"; Last Mission. "Endless Summer"

=== Full Metal Panic! Sigma ===
No.	Japanese release date	Japanese ISBN
1	July 28, 2005	978-4-04-712416-5
Mission 001. "The Beginning"; Mission 002. "Trust You"; Mission 003. "Black And White"
2	December 22, 2005	978-4-04-712438-7
Mission 004. "Empty"; Mission 005. "Stand Alone"; Mission 006. "Rainy Blue"; Mission 007. "Walk The Labyrinth"
3	June 29, 2006	978-4-04-712454-7
Mission 008. "Living Dead"; Mission 009. "Take Back"; Mission 010. "Waiting For Hero"; Mission 011. "Find My Way"; Mission 012. "Stay With You"; "Extra: Full Metal Panic! Σ Trailer"
4	November 29, 2006	978-4-04-712472-1
Mission 013. "My Evenful Day As The Captain (Part 1)"; Mission 014. "My Evenful Day As The Captain (Part 2)"; Mission 015. "The Scene Just Before A Mission"; Mission 016. "Goddess Arrives (Onsen Trip)"; Mission 017. "Flowers Of Bullets"
5	May 7, 2007	978-4-04-712491-2
Mission 018. "Time To Countdown"; Mission 019. "5 Minutes' Run Way"; Mission 020. "Soldier's Corridor"; Mission 021. "Big One Shot"; Mission 022. "Big One Percent"
6	October 4, 2007	978-4-04-712514-8
Mission 023. "Break Through"; Mission 024. "I'm Not Student. I'm Killer"; Mission 025. "Girl Separates From Boy"; Mission 026. "Stand On My Own"; Mission 027. "Birth Of Mithril"
7	February 7, 2008	978-4-04-712533-9
Mission 028. "Chasing The Enemy"; Mission 029. "Her Memories"; Mission 030. "Real Bout"; Mission 031. "Savage VS M9"
8	July 7, 2008	978-4-04-712555-1
Mission 032. "Cost Of Hesitation"; Mission 033. "Pursuit Battle"; Mission 034. "Only You"; Mission 035. "The Voice From The North Pole"
9	October 7, 2008	978-4-04-712568-1
Mission 036. "Degenerated Witch"; Mission 037. "Reactivation"; Mission 038. "Each Of Their Roads"; Mission 039. "Ace In The Holde"
10	March 5, 2009	978-4-04-712593-3
Mission 040. "Close To You"; Mission 041. "Jet Stream Attack"; Mission 042. "Power To Advance"; Mission 043. "Like A Sword Of Fire"
11	July 7, 2009	978-4-04-712613-8
Mission 044. "Make My Day"; Mission 045. "Vacation Of 30 Minutes"; Mission 046. "Chain Of Responsibility"; Mission 047. "Go To The Beginning Place"
12	November 5, 2009	978-4-04-712632-9
Mission 048. "Reunion"; Mission 049. "Key Stone"; Mission 050. "Good Bye Days"; Mission 051. "Whispering"
13	June 4, 2010	978-4-04-712668-8
Mission 052. "King Of The World"; Mission 053. "Last Shooting"; Mission 054. "Good Bye My Mate"; Mission 055. "Cry In The Disappearing World"; Mission 056. "Engage Six Seven Part 1"
14	November 5, 2010	978-4-04-712694-7
Mission 057. "Engage Six Seven Part 2"; Mission 058. "Intervals Sad, Range Far Part 1"; Mission 059. "Intervals Sad, Range Far Part 2"; Mission 060. "A Cat And A Kitten's Rock & Roll"
15	May 6, 2011	978-4-04-712723-4
Mission 061. "Chrysalis"; Mission 062. "X`Mas Terror"; Mission 063. "I Am A Hero"; Mission 064. "Die Hard"; Mission 065. "Captain's Melancholy"; Mission 066. "Under Water Battle"
16	November 5, 2011	978-4-04-712756-2
Mission 067. "Relation Between 3 Submariners"; Mission 068. "Full Metal-Santa Claus"; Mission 069. "Perfect Tactics"; Mission 070. "Very Merry Christmas"; Mission 071. "The Calm Before The Storm"
17	April 5, 2012	978-4-04-712788-3
Mission 072. "Father & Son"; Mission 073. "Forked Road"; Mission 074. "Threat in Afghanistan"; Mission 075. "Each Decision"; Mission 076. "The Dismissal of Mithril"; Mission 077. "All For One"
18	December 6, 2012	978-4-04-712841-5
Mission 078. "Pale Horse"; Mission 079. "Human's Heart / Machine's Heart"; Mission 080. "Hard Landing"; Mission 081. "Black & White"; Mission 082. "Showdown"; Mission 083. "She Bade Her Adieu For Ever"
19	September 20, 2013	978-4-04-712901-6
Mission 084. "Broken Arrows"; Mission 085. "Her Cry from the Bottom"; Mission 086. "Sagara Sousuke"; Mission 087. "Will to Live"; Mission 088. "Time Limit"; Mission 089. "Father"; Mission 090. "Always, Stand By Me"

=== Full Metal Panic! Another ===
No.	Japanese release date	Japanese ISBN
1	March 22, 2012	978-4-04-120176-3
Chapter 1-5
2	August 8, 2012	978-4-04-120332-3
Chapter 6-11
3	February 7, 2013	978-4-04-120582-2
Chapter 12-16
4	July 6, 2013	978-4-04-120781-9
Chapter 17-21
5	December 6, 2013	978-4-04-120944-8
Chapter 22-26
6	August 26, 2014	978-4-04-101897-2
Chapter 27-34

=== Full Metal Panic! 0 ―ZERO― ===
No.	Japanese release date	Japanese ISBN
1	September 20, 2013	978-4-04-712902-3
001. "Prologue"; 002. "Boy Meets Girl"; 003. "High School Life"; 004. "Surprise Attack"
2	October 9, 2013	978-4-04-712903-0
005. "School Excursion"; 006. "Take Off! Take Off! Take..."; 007. "Light And Sound"; 008. "Lambda Driver"
3	August 20, 2014	978-4-04-070252-0
009. "Rescue Squad"; 010. "Absolute Obedience"; 011. "Go Together"; 012. "Act On Instinct"; 013. "Girl Meets Boy"
4	June 5, 2015	978-4-04-070253-7
014. "Hashiru One Night Stand 1"; 015. "Hashiru One Night Stand 2"; 016. "Hashiru One Night Stand 3"; 017. "Hashiru One Night Stand 4"; 018. "Hashiru One Night Stand 5"
5	June 5, 2015	978-4-04-070254-4
019. "Hashiru One Night Stand 6"; 020. "Hashiru One Night Stand 7"; 021. "Hashiru One Night Stand 8"; 022. "Hashiru One Night Stand 9"; 023. "Hashiru One Night Stand 10"

=== Full Metal Panic! Another Sigma ===
No.	Japanese release date	Japanese ISBN
1	February 26, 2015	978-4-04-102786-8
Chapter 1-5
2	November 26, 2015	978-4-04-103585-6
Chapter 6-9
