= Fetish Con =

Annual trade show in the United States

- Status: Active
- Venue: St. Petersburg, Florida
- Country: United States
- Inaugurated: October 11–13, 2001
- Website: fetishcon.com

Fetish Con is an annual trade show focusing on networking within the adult entertainment industry. The trade show include lectures for the general public and retail sales of adult clothing and toys. Founders Genesis Lynn, Vesta and Mike came up with the idea when they started sharing shoots with each other in 2000.

Many of Fetish Con's attendees are people who practice fetishism and BDSM or have an interest in it. The event was first held in 2001 in New York City and it has been produced by XIX Events since its inception. Fetish Con moved to Tampa, Florida in 2004 and to St. Petersburg, Florida in 2015 to accommodate increased attendence. It had a two-year hiatus from 2020 to 2021 due to the Covid-19 pandemic.

== Dates and locations ==
Date	Location	Notes
October 11–13, 2001	Queens, New York	known as Bond Con
June 2002	Queens, New York	known as Bond Con NYC
March 2003	Queens, New York	known as Bond Con NYC
September 2004	Tampa, Florida	known as Fetish Con
August 2005	Tampa, Florida	known as Fetish Con
August 2006	Tampa, Florida	known as Fetish Con
August 2007	Tampa, Florida	known as Fetish Con
August 2008	Tampa, Florida	known as Fetish Con
August 2009	Tampa, Florida	known as Fetish Con
August 2010	Tampa, Florida	known as Fetish Con
July 2011	Tampa, Florida	known as Fetish Con
August 2012	Tampa, Florida	known as Fetish Con
August 2013	Tampa, Florida	known as Fetish Con
August 2014	Tampa, Florida	known as Fetish Con
August 2015	St. Petersburg, Florida	known as Fetish Con
August 2016	St. Petersburg, Florida	known as Fetish Con
August 2017	St. Petersburg, Florida	known as Fetish Con
August 2018	St. Petersburg, Florida	known as Fetish Con
August 2019	St. Petersburg, Florida	known as Fetish Con
2020 - Event Postponed due to COVID		
2021 - Event Postponed due to COVID
August 2022	St. Petersburg, Florida	known as Fetish Con
August 2023	St. Petersburg, Florida	known as Fetish Con
August 2024	St. Petersburg, Florida	known as Fetish Con
August 2025	St. Petersburg, Florida	known as Fetish Con
August 2026	St. Petersburg, Florida	known as Fetish Con
