= Flower and Snake (2004 film) =

- Directed by: Takashi Ishii
- Written by: Takashi Ishii (screenplay)
- Produced by: Kazuo Shimizu
- Starring: Aya Sugimoto
- Edited by: Yūji Murayama
- Music by: Gorō Yasukawa
- Distributed by: Toei Video
- Release date: March 13, 2004 (Japan)
- Running time: 115 minutes
- Country: Japan
- Language: Japanese

Flower and Snake (花と蛇, Hana to hebi) is a 2004 Japanese film directed by Takashi Ishii, starring Aya Sugimoto. It is based on the 1974 film Flower and Snake directed by Masaru Konuma, which stars Naomi Tani. The earlier film, based on a novel by Oniroku Dan, was part of Nikkatsu's Roman Porno series. The 2004 version has been described as a "watershed moment in the history of Japanese film censorship" with "some of the most extravagant scenes of sexual cruelty and graphic nudity to be passed off as mainstream entertainment in any part of the world."

== Plot ==
On the surface, Shizuko is a beautiful and talented tango dancer married to the handsome and successful businessman Takayoshi Tōyama. However, Shizuko is troubled by recurring masochistic dreams and her inability to be sexually aroused by her husband. The yakuza boss Kanzō Morita has a video recording supplied by Kawada, a disgruntled former employee, that implicates Tōyama in a bribery scheme. Due to the recording and Tōyama's heavy financial debt to the yakuza, Morita informs Tōyama that his only recourse is his wife, whom his mentor - the politically powerful Ippei Tashiro - is obsessed with. When Tōyama learns that Tashiro is 95 years old, he convinces himself that bringing his wife to him will not be a major problem. Tōyama brings Shizuko to a supposed masked ball, where she is kidnapped and forced into a private bondage show for the elderly yakuza chief and his twisted associates. Shizuko initially resists but submits when her female bodyguard Kyōko (who was also kidnapped) is submitted to sexual torture and threatened with death. Shizuko is subjected to a series of punishments including abundant rope bondage. When Tōyama repents and finally reaches her after paying off his debt to the yakuza, her only response is "Do me!" After more sexual events, Shizuko finally escapes, although it is ambiguous whether her experience was real or another masochistic dream.

== Cast ==
- Aya Sugimoto as Shizuko Tōyama
- Renji Ishibashi as Ippei Tashiro
- Hironobu Nomura (野村宏伸) as Takayoshi Tōyama
- Kenichi Endō as Kanzō Morita
- Misaki (未向) as Kyōko Nojima
- Yōzaburō Itō (伊藤洋三郎) as Clown
- Yoshiyuki Yamaguchi (山口祥行) as Ryō Eguchi
- Shun Nakayama as Kazuo Kawada
- Shigeo Kobayashi as Yoshizawa

== Production ==
Masaru Konuma's 1974 version of Flower and Snake was Nikkatsu studio's first venture into S&M oriented films. The 2004 film is similar to its predecessor only by name and its general theme, instead sharing much of its spirit with the features of Roman Porno S&M. Throughout the film, Aya Sugimoto worked closely with bondage master Go Arisue.

== Sequels ==
The film sequel Flower and Snake 2 (花と蛇２ パリ／静子, Hana to hebi 2: Pari / Shizuko) was released by Toei on May 14, 2005. Sugimoto reprised her role as Shizuko, but with a much older husband. The setting takes place in Paris, but the plot still centers on sado-masochism with Kenichi Endō as the artist Ikegami who leads Shizuko into his shadowy world. Toei released a second sequel to this film on August 28, 2010, titled Flower and Snake 3 (花と蛇３, Hana to hebi 3), which stars Minako Komukai as Shizuko. This sequel was directed by Yusuke Narita and featured an appearance by Kei Mizutani. A third sequel, Flower and Snake: Zero was released in 2014.
