= Whistle! =

Japanese manga series by Daisuke Higuchi

- First tankōbon volume cover

ホイッスル! (Hoissuru!)
- Genre: Sports
- Manga
- Written by: Daisuke Higuchi
- Published by: Shueisha
- English publisher: NA: Viz Media
- Imprint: Jump Comics
- Magazine: Weekly Shōnen Jump
- Original run: February 24, 1998 – October 8, 2002
- Volumes: 24
- Anime television series
- Directed by: Hiroshi Fukutomi
- Written by: Shun'ichi Yukimuro
- Music by: Toshihiko Sahashi
- Studio: Studio Comet
- Original network: Animax
- Original run: May 5, 2002 – February 3, 2003
- Episodes: 39
- Video game

Whistle!: Fuki Nukeru Kaze
- Publisher: Konami
- Genre: Sports
- Platform: PlayStation
- Released: January 3, 2003
- Video game

Whistle!: Dai 37-kai Tokyo-to Chuugakkou Sougou Taiiku Soccer Taikai
- Developer: Intense
- Publisher: Konami
- Genre: Sports
- Platform: Game Boy Advance
- Released: February 27, 2003
- Manga

Whistle! W
- Written by: Daisuke Higuchi
- Published by: Shogakukan
- Imprint: Ura Sunday Comics
- Magazine: Ura Sunday; MangaONE
- Original run: September 26, 2016 – April 5, 2021
- Volumes: 5
- icon

Whistle! (Japanese: ホイッスル!, Hepburn: Hoissuru!) is a Japanese manga series written and illustrated by Daisuke Higuchi. The series was published in Shueisha's Weekly Shōnen Jump from February 1998 to October 2002. The series was adapted into a 39-episode anime television series broadcast exclusively by Animax across Japan. In North America, the series was licensed for English language release by Viz Media. A sequel, titled Whistle! W, ran in Shogakukan's Ura Sunday and MangaONE web platforms from September 2016 to April 2021.

== Plot ==
Whistle! is about a middle school boy named Shō Kazamatsuri. He transfers from Musashinomori School to Sakura Jōsui Junior High School for better hopes to make the soccer team, since he never got a game at his old school due to his small stature. Yūko Katori, his teacher, introduces him as a former star of the famed Musashinomori team, causing his classmates to be wrongly ecstatic. Right after that, one of the players, Tatsuya Mizuno, reveals that he was never a regular. In other words, since he never got the chance to play, Shō is a poor player. Shō struggles to improve his skill so he can make the team at his new school and to ignore the drastic disadvantage he has due to his height.

== Media ==
=== Manga ===
Written and illustrated by Daisuke Higuchi, Whistle! was serialized in Shueisha's shōnen manga magazine Weekly Shōnen Jump from February 24, 1998, (Note: It started in the magazine's 13th issue of 1998 (cover date March 9), released on February 24 of that same year.) to October 8, 2002. (Note: It finished in the magazine's 45th issue of 2002 (cover date October 21), released on October 8 of that same year.) Shueisha collected its 212 chapters in 24 tankōbon volumes, released between July 3, 1998, and March 4, 2003.

In North America, the series was licensed for English release by Viz Media. The 24 volumes were released from October 12, 2004, to January 5, 2010.

A sequel manga, title Whistle! W (ホイッスル！W, Hoissuru! Daburu), started in Shogakukan's Ura Sunday manga website on September 26, 2016. The manga went on hiatus in April 2019 due to Higuchi's health issues. The series resumed publication after nearly two years on February 8, 2021, and finished on April 5, 2021. Shogakukan collected its chapters in five tankobon volumes, released from to May 19, 2017, to May 19, 2021.

=== Anime ===
A 39-episode anime television series adaptation aired in Japan on Animax from May 5, 2002, to February 3, 2003. The opening and ending themes are "Double Wind" and "Sweet Days" respectively, both performed by Minako Komukai. In 2016, a new Japanese audio track for the anime was aired.

=== Video games ===
Games include: Game Boy Advance and PlayStation versions.

=== Stage adaptation ===
A stage play adaptation was announced in February 2016 for a late August to early September release.

== Reception ==
The Whistle! series has received good reception. A review by Greg McElhatton of Read About Comics stated that the Whistle! manga had good drawings that showed the characters move around with the soccer ball during matches. David Welsh of Precocious Curmudgeon said the series is very interesting that those who do not have soccer background will enjoy reading the manga, as well as with the realistic illustration used.

Scott Campbell and Holly Ellingwood of Active Anime have remarked that the art is clear since all the "line and detail has obvious care and attention given to it, resulting in well-managed visuals for a well-flowing read.", while praising Sho's character development as the readers "see him strive against so much to obtain what he worked for is uplifting." Eduardo M. Chavez's review on Whistle! Volume 1 noted that although it does not look good for characters to run away from their problems, Sho's inner determination to play soccer is the main highlight of the series.
