= Japanese bondage =

Japanese style of consensual rope bondage

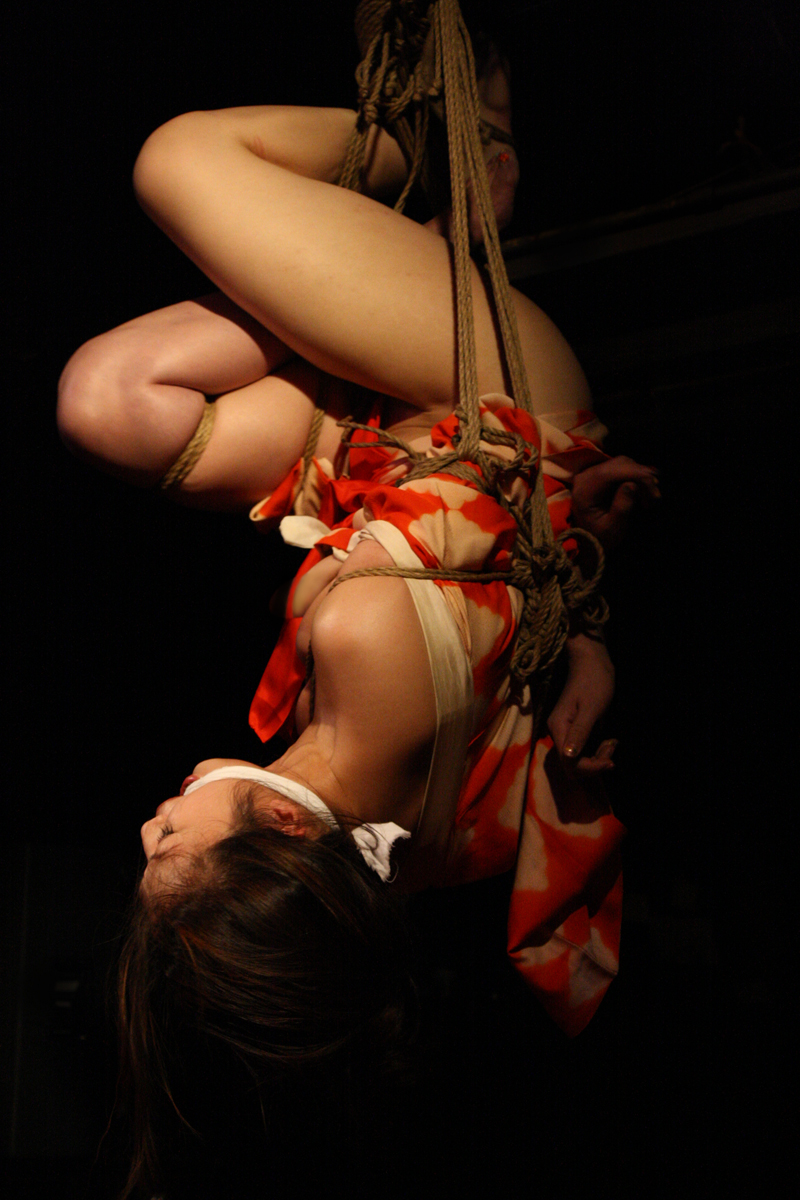
Naka Akira's show at Toubaku features a half naked woman suspended upside down using intricate rope bondage. Such techniques are regularly used to restrain a person in uncomfortable positions.

Kinbaku (Japanese: 緊縛; 'tight binding'), also called kinbaku-bi (緊縛美; 'the beauty of tight binding'), is a Japanese style of bondage or BDSM which involves tying a person up using simple yet visually intricate patterns, usually with several pieces of thin rope (often jute, hemp or linen and generally around 6 mm (0.24 in) in diameter, but sometimes as small as 4 mm (0.16 in), and between 7–8 m (23–26 ft) long). In Japanese this natural-fibre rope is known as asanawa (麻縄).

Shibari (縛り) is a Japanese word that broadly means "binding" or "tying" in most contexts, but is used in BDSM to refer to this style of decorative bondage (Kinbaku), a meaning first popularized in the West in the 1990s. Shibari is inspired by the samurai martial art of restraining captives with rope in the shortest amount of time, causing hemp rope to become a Japanese symbol of power. This is similar to how handcuffs are used to symbolize power and restrain partners in a Western BDSM context.

Shibari, or Kinbaku, focuses on the aesthetics and display of the body: a symbolic or artistic (rather than ordinary physical) show of sexual power. As a result, and due to the manipulation of body parts using rope to achieve this, it is common, though not always required, for models or participants to be fully naked and the art form regularly incorporates aspects of BDSM such as erotic humiliation. It may be used for restraint as well as solely being a visual.

== History ==
Bondage as a sexual activity first came to notice in Japan in the late Edo period (about 1600 to 1860s). Generally recognized as "father of Kinbaku", Seiu Ito, started studying and researching hojōjutsu (the art of binding a prisoner of war) and is credited with the inception of kinbaku, though it is noted that he drew inspiration from other art forms of the time, including kabuki theatre and ukiyo-e woodblock prints.

Kinbaku became widely popular in Japan in the 1950s through magazines such as Kitan Club and Yomikiri Romance, which published the first naked bondage photographs. In the 1960s, people such as Eikichi Osada began performing live SM shows, often including a large amount of rope bondage. Today, these performers are often referred to as nawashi (rope master) or bakushi (from kinbakushi, meaning bondage master).

Kinbaku has become popular in the Western BDSM scene in its own right and has influenced Western-style bondage.

== Rope types ==
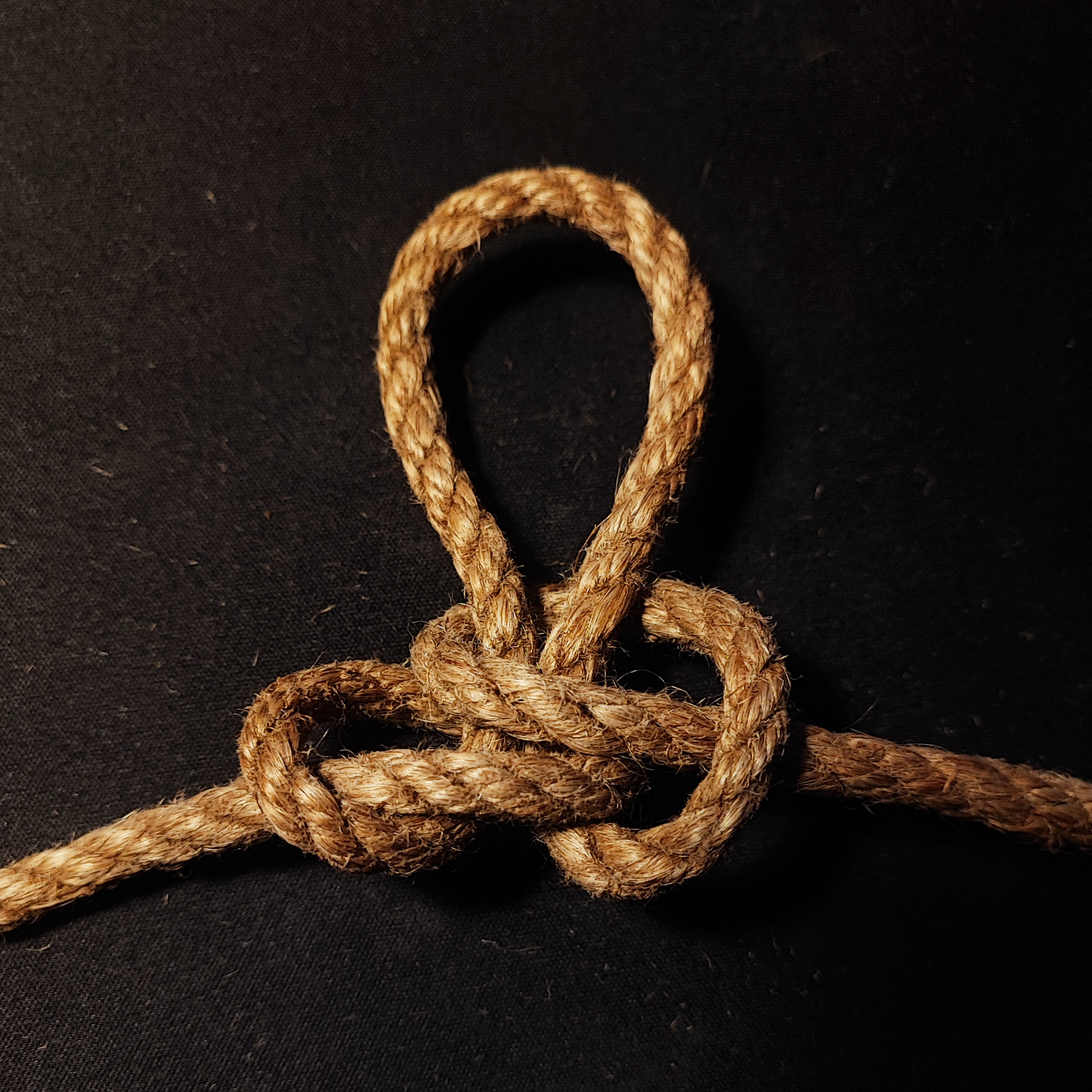
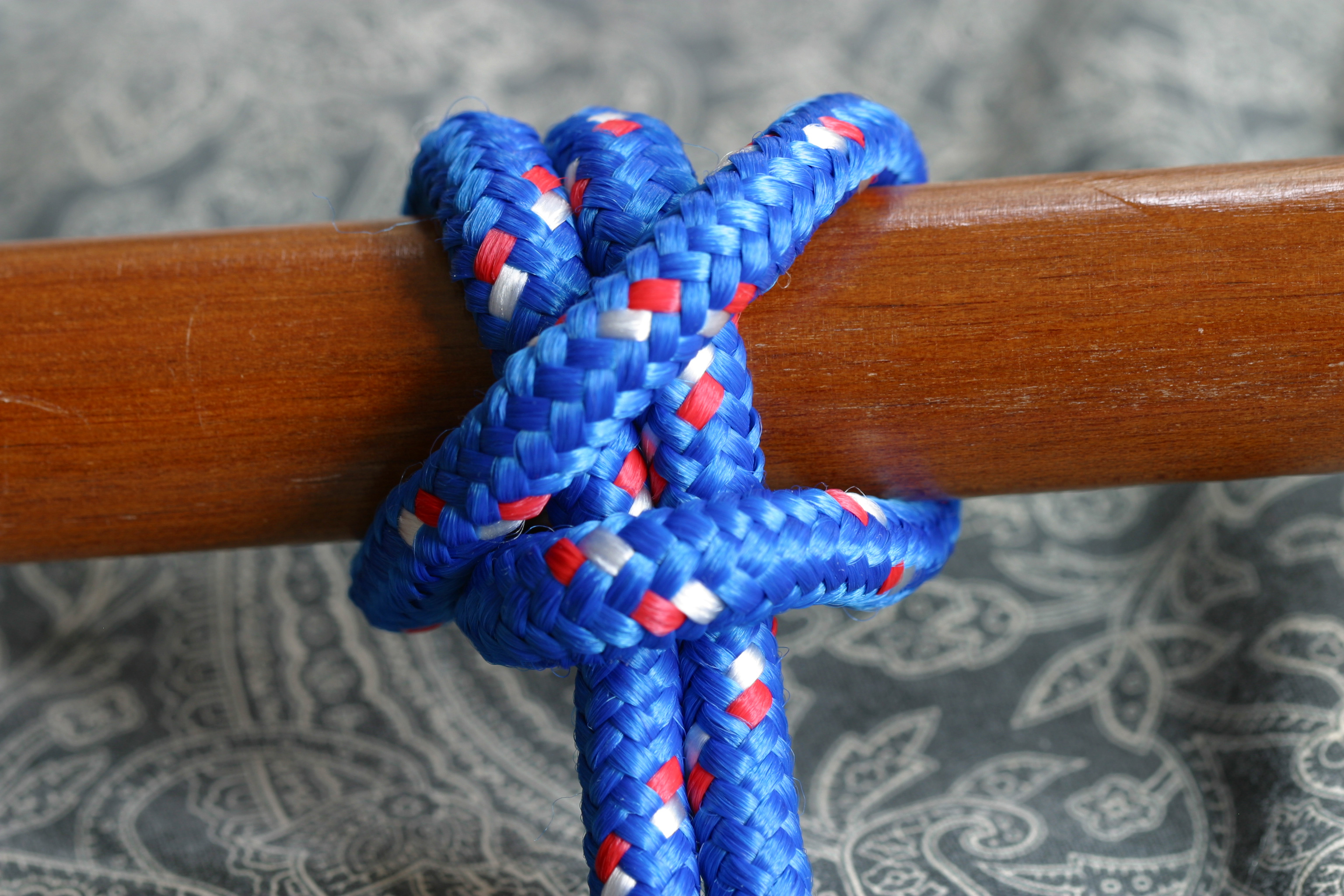
Jute rope (left) and nylon rope (right)

In Japan the most often used type of rope is a loose-laid, three strand jute rope. This rope is referred to as asanawa, usually translated as "hemp rope" with 'asa' meaning hemp and 'nawa' meaning rope; however this uses the more generic form of the word 'hemp', referring to a range of natural fibre ropes rather than those made from a particular plant. In recent history a range of rope types have been used for kinbaku in Japan, though nawashi rarely use synthetic fibre rope and most often use jute.

Kinbaku is practiced with ropes of 6–8 meters (20–26 feet) in length. Due to the generally larger physique of Western subjects, 7–8 meters (23–26 feet) ropes are commonly used in the West. Though the rope material is usually jute (or hemp), many other materials are in use including cotton and various synthetics. Various techniques are used to make the natural fibre ropes softer.

Synthetic ropes have become popular in the US for the vibrant colors available and ease of washing. Most commonly used is 6mm diameter, but 8mm diameter and other sizes may also be used. The most common standard length is 30 feet or ten meters; however, many vendors provide custom lengths.

== Aesthetics of Japanese bondage ==
The aesthetics of the bound person's position is important: in particular, Japanese bondage is distinguished by its use of specific katas (forms) and aesthetic rules. Sometimes, asymmetric and often intentionally uncomfortable positions are employed. In particular, Japanese bondage is very much about the way the rope is applied and the pleasure is more in the journey than the destination. In this way the rope becomes an extension of the nawashi's hands and is used to communicate.

Traditional Japanese bondage techniques use natural vegetable fiber rope (hemp, jute, or linen) exclusively, though contemporary Japanese Masters have been working with a range of rope materials. The natural fibers easily lock to each other which means the bondage can be held together by the friction of twists and turns or very simple knots.

== Shibari in contemporary art ==
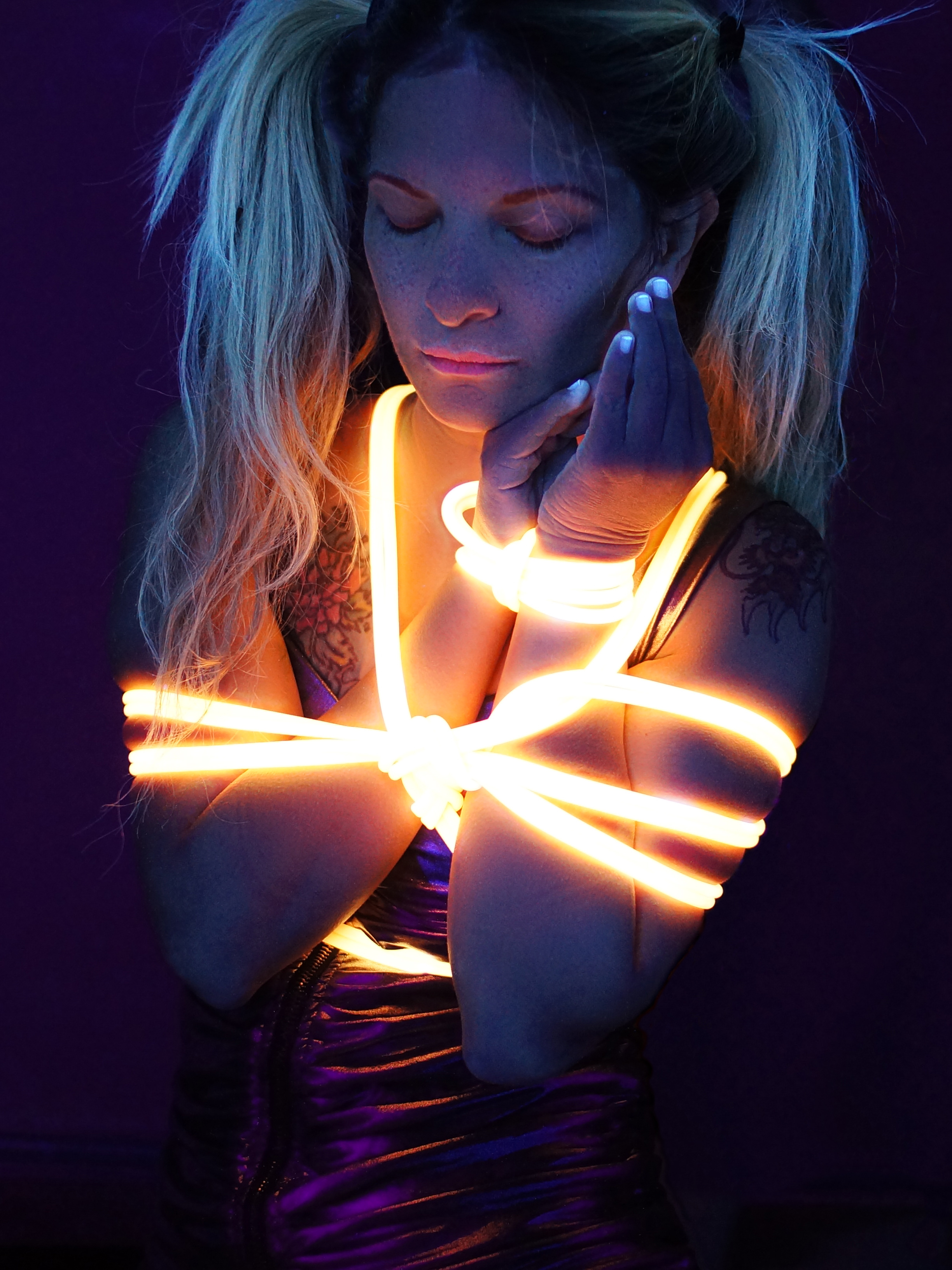
Blacklight Shibari with fluorescent ropes

Shibari has a strong presence in the works of some renowned contemporary artists, mainly photographers, like Nobuyoshi Araki in Japan, Jim Duvall in the United States and Hikari Kesho in Europe.

In 2014, Romanian singer-songwriter NAVI released a Shibari-themed music video, "Picture Perfect". The video, directed by Marian Nica, was controversial and banned by Romanian television for its explicit erotic content.

Shibari has also featured in Western pop culture. For example, in the music video for The Jonas Brothers song "Sucker", Joe Jonas and Sophie Turner briefly appear to be engaging in a form of Japanese-inspired bondage. Shibari is explicitly referenced in "Tying the Knot", the nineteenth episode of The Good Wife's fifth season, as the practice of shibari is integral to the episode's plot; in this episode, fictional characters Colin Sweeney and Renata Ellard Sweeney (portrayed by actors Dylan Baker and Laura Benanti respectively) are revealed to engage in the art of shibari, and shibari is also used as a means by which Renata's friend, Morgan Donnelly (portrayed by actress Jenn Gambatese), is murdered.

One modern distinction that has gained popularity among westerners wanting to distinguish the terms is that shibari refers to purely artistic, aesthetic rope, while kinbaku refers to the artistic, connective, sensual, sexual practice as a whole. While multiple books and articles have been written in Japanese about shibari, no one has found evidence of there being any thought given to the distinction between these words among Japanese practitioners of the art.

A traditional view is that the term shibari is a Western misuse of Japanese vocabulary. The word denotes tying in Japanese, but in a generic way, and traditionally not in the context of bondage. The names for many particular ties include shibari, but it was not traditional to name the entire activity in that way. Instead, Kinbaku is the term for artistic or erotic tying within traditional Japanese rope bondage circles. An even more traditional view is that shibari is a term used for erotic bondage in Japan that is practically interchangeable with the term kinbaku. Itoh Seiu (generally considered one of the fathers of contemporary Japanese rope bondage) used the term in the 1950s, with no sign of it being a "western Japonism" as did many other well-known Japanese bakushi. One of Nureki Chimuo's how-to video series from the 1980s, is titled Introduction to Shibari.

While some claim this is a somewhat hidebound definition and the word shibari is now increasingly being re-imported from the West to Japan, as the tying communities are very close-knit, there is no evidence to support such a conclusion as most practicing bakushi in Japan have very limited contact with the west and almost no interest in debating the meaning of words. Most Japanese kinbakushi do not object to the term shibari, as it is common vernacular in the global community.

The actual term Kinbaku was first developed and used in the August 1952 issue of Kitan Club (p.147-148) by author and Bakushi Minomura Kou and Bakushi Tsujimura Takashi. Until that issue, most magazines only had nude photographs of women but few in bondage. In order to specify the act of erotic bondage as opposed to the act of just tying Kinbaku was then created by the aforementioned Bakushi.

== Technique ==
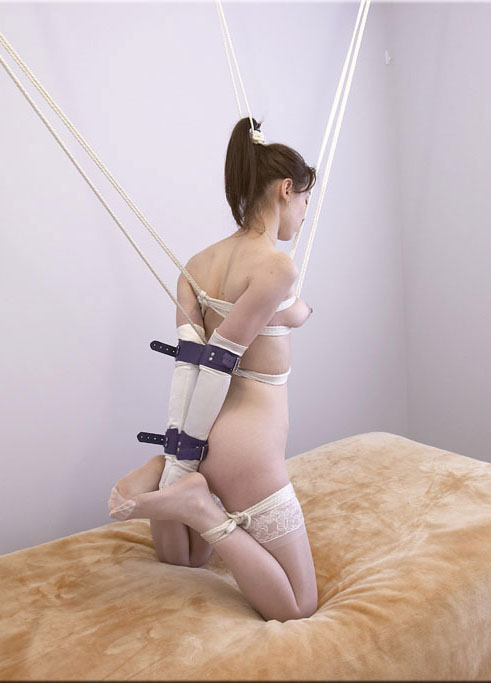
Model in vertical hogtie

Kinbaku is based on fairly specific rope patterns, many of them derived from Hojojutsu ties though significantly modified to make them safer for bondage use. Many Hojojutsu ties were deliberately designed to cause harm to a prisoner and are therefore not suitable for erotic bondage. Of particular importance are the Ushiro Takatekote (a type of box tie which surrounds the chest and arms), which forms the basis of many Kinbaku ties, and the Ebi-tie, or "Shrimp", which was originally designed as a torture tie and codified as part of the Edo period torture techniques. (Note: Kujikata Osadamegki Government Officials Guide of 1742 describes the four tortures to be used to get a confession: Muchiuchi whipping with a bamboo pole, followed by Ishidaki kneeling torture, then the Ebizeme shrimp-tie applied so strictly that bloodflow was cut off to the legs, and finally Tsurizeme upside-down hanging torture) Today the ebi-tie is used as part of BDSM play and can be considered a form of Semenawa, rope torture.

== Glossary ==
- kinbaku (緊縛): (noun) literally "tight binding". It does not convey the meaning of sexual bondage outside BDSM circles. However, some experts, e.g. Kinoko Hajime and Osada Steve, make a distinction from "shibari" in that it is used to refer to sessions with a strong emotional exchange.
- kinbakushi (緊縛師): (noun) kinbaku master, can be shortened to bakushi.
- shibari (縛り): (noun) the act of tying, binding or weaving. It does not convey the meaning of sexual bondage outside BDSM circles.
- shibaru (縛る): (verb) tie or bind with a rope
- nawashi (縄師): (noun) literally, "a maker of rope", but in BDSM circles it means a professional "rope artist"

== Kinbaku patterns ==
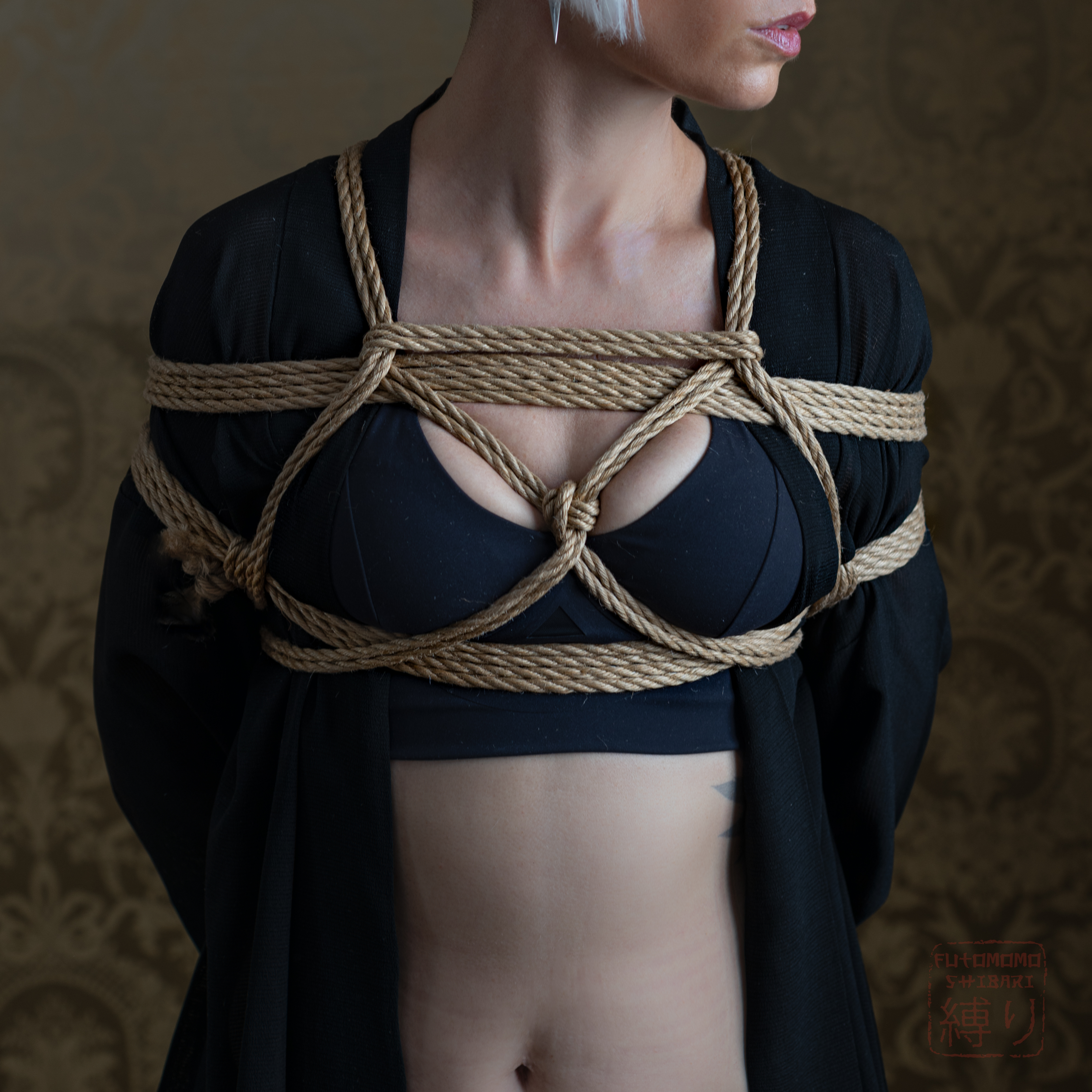
Traditional Takate Kote 3 ropes

Most of the patterns below have multiple variations:

- Ushiro takate kote – Foundational form for most shibari ties, capturing the upper body / breasts and arms behind back (when ushiro) in a "U" shape behind the back
- Single wrist binding 片手首縛り Katate kubi shibari
- Both wrists binding 両手首縛り Ryoute kubi shibari
- Handcuff binding 手錠縛り Tejou shibari
- Prisoner handcuff binding 連行手錠縛り Renkou tejou shibari
- Hands behind the back binding 後ろ手縛り Ushiro te shibari
- High hands behind the back binding 後ろ高手小手縛り(簡易型 Ushiro takate kote shibari)
- Hands behind the head tie 後頭後ろ手縛り Koutou ushiro te shibari
- Tasuki (kimono string) tied 襷(タスキ)縛り Tasuki (tasuki ) shibari
- Crotch rope tie また縄縛り Mata nawa shibari
- Turtle (diamond pattern) binding 亀甲縛り(菱縄縛り) Kikkou shibari (hishi nawa shibari)
- Upright standing binding 直立不動一本縛り Chokuritsu fudou ippon shibari
- Cross-legged binding 胡座 縛り Agura shibari
- Shrimp binding 海老縛り Ebi shibari
- Reverse shrimp binding 逆さ海老縛り Sakasa ebi shibari
- Standing partial suspension 立ち吊り縛り Tachi tsuri shibari
- One foot lifted partial suspension 片足上げ吊り縛り1 Kataashi age tsuri shibari
- Hanging letter M, open leg binding M字開脚吊り縛り M ji kaikyaku tsuri shibari
- Reverse hanging shrimp binding 逆海老吊り縛り Gyaku ebi tsuri shibari
- Reverse prayer hands 後手 合掌 縛り – Gote gasshou shibari
- Arms bound in front 前手 肘 縛り – Maete hiji shibari
- Legs bound together 両足 合体 – 文字 縛り– Ryouashi gattai Ichimonji Shibari
- Rifle tie 鉄砲 縛り– Teppou shibari
- Leg, calf to thigh 太もも – Futomomo
- High hands on front tie 前方 高手 縛り– Zenpou takate shibari

== Vocabulary ==
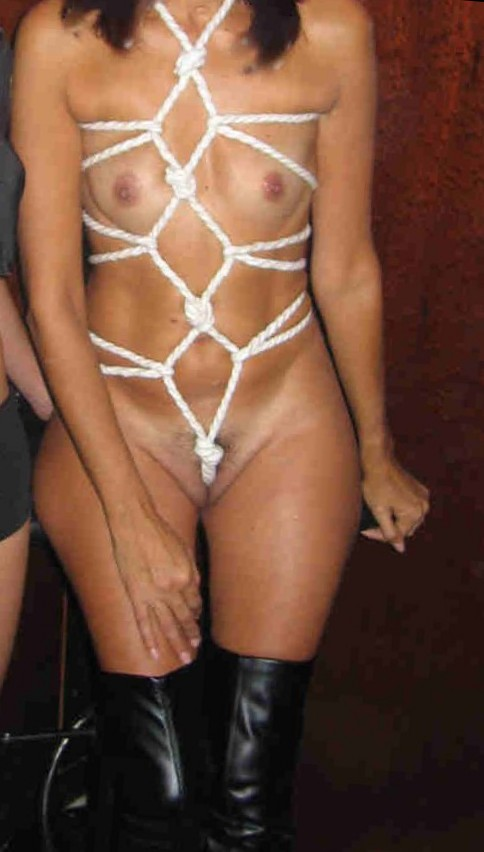
Nude model in Karada

Topics in Japanese bondage include:

- Karada – a Japanese word used in the West for body (body harness, a "rope dress")
- Kikkou – a body tie that ends with a tortoise shell design in the front upper torso.
- Hishi – a tie using diamond shapes. When done as a full body tie, it is sometimes also called hishi-kikkou. The hishi has been popularized by manga, or cartoon, art.
- Ebi – the "shrimp" tie
- Agoura – a less severe tie similar to an ebi
- Tazuki – a "criss-cross harness"
- Tanuki – a "raccoon dog"
- Kataashi tsuri – a "one-legged suspension"
- Asymmetric bondage – a common feature of Japanese bondage
- Tsuri suspension
- Gyaku ebi
- Hojojutsu

== See also ==
- Bondage positions and methods
- Rope bondage
