= Nami Matsukawa =

Japanese pink film actress and bondage and fetish model

- Born: August 18, 1961 (age 64); Hamamatsu, Japan
- Occupations: Actress, BDSM model
- Years active: 1982–1984

Nami Matsukawa (松川 ナミ, Matsukawa Nami) is a Japanese 1980s pink film actress and bondage and fetish model who is best known for being the 4th Nikkatsu SM Queen in 1983.

== Career ==
By 1980, Nami Matsukawa was a sex worker named "Emi" at the SM club Blue Chateau in Akasaka, Tokyo. Matsukawa made her Nikkatsu debut with Masaru Konuma's 1982 Slave Contract (奴隷契約書), to be later promoted as the fourth "SM Queen" (SMの女王, SM no joō) following Naomi Tani, Junko Mabuki, and Izumi Shima. She also performed as a bondage model for nawashi Hiroshi Urado in the SM Fairy Nami Matsukawa (SMの妖精・松川ナミ) series of Nikkatsu Video in 1982. Her girl-next door quality made her popular with audiences, but SM-author Oniroku Dan complained that, unlike the buxom Naomi Tani, Matsukawa was not fleshy enough to be an appealing bondage subject in his films. Rope and Breasts of Konuma was Matsukawa's farewell appearance as the Nikkatsu SM Queen and she was replaced by Miki Takakura after a brief "reign".

== Filmography ==
Title	Release date	Studio	Director	Notes
Slave Contract 奴隷契約書	22 January 1982	Nikkatsu	Masaru Konuma	Co-starring Izumi Shima
Slave Contract: Whip and High Heels 奴隷契約書 鞭とハイヒール	28 May 1982	Nikkatsu	Shun Nakahara	
Marked Ama: Stirred-Up Shell くいこみ海女 乱れ貝	9 July 1982	Nikkatsu	Atsushi Fujiura	Starring Ryoko Watanabe
Meat Slave: Sad Toy 肉奴隷 悲しき玩具	1 October 1982	Nikkatsu	Katsuhiko Fujii	Co-starring Kazuyo Ezaki
Rope and Breasts 縄と乳房	7 January 1983	Nikkatsu	Masaru Konuma	Co-starring Izumi Shima
Woman with Pierced Nipples 乳首にピアスをした女	25 April 1983	Nikkatsu	Shōgorō Nishimura	Starring Jun Izumi
Female Prisoner: Cage 女囚 檻	16 September 1983	Nikkatsu	Masaru Konuma	Starring Mina Asami
Kōichirō Uno's The Dancing Girl of Izu 宇能鴻一郎の伊豆の踊子	25 May 1984	Nikkatsu	Atsushi Fujiura	Starring Kate Asabuki
Main Theme メイン・テーマ	14 July 1984	Toei Company	Yoshimitsu Morita	Starring Hiroko Yakushimaru

=== Videos ===
Title	Release date	Studio	Director
Slave Candle Play 奴隷ローソク責め	1982	Nikkatsu Video	Hiroshi Urado
Female Prisoner Crucified Water Boarding 女囚磔 水責め	1982	Nikkatsu Video	Hiroshi Urado

== Bibliography ==
- Weisser, Thomas; Yuko Mihara Weisser (1998). Japanese Cinema Encyclopedia: The Sex Films. Miami: Vital Books : Asian Cult Cinema Publications. ISBN 1-889288-52-7.
