= List of Japanese films of 1978 =

A list of films released in Japan in 1978 (see 1978 in film).

Title	Director	Cast	Genre	Notes
1978
Bandits vs. Samurai Squadron	Hideo Gosha	Junko Miyashita; Tatsuya Nakadai		
Dainamaito dondon				
Dynamite Dondon				
The Demon	Yoshitaro Nomura	Ken Ogata; Shima Iwashita	Drama	
Empire of Passion	Nagisa Oshima	Tatsuya Fuji, Kazuko Yoshiyuki, Takahiro Tamura, Takuzo Kawatani	Drama horror romance	Japanese-French co-production; Won Best Director at the 1978 Cannes Film Festival
The Glacier Fox	Koreyoshi Kurahara	Eiji Okada (narrator)	Docufiction	
The Incident	Yoshitaro Nomura	Keiko Matsuzaka		Japan Academy Prize for Best Film
Invisible Man: Rape!	Isao Hayashi	Izumi Shima	Roman porno	
JAKQ Dengeki Tai vs. Goranger			Sci-fi for children	First Super Sentai crossover.
Lady Black Rose	Shōgorō Nishimura	Naomi Tani	Roman porno	
Lupin III: The Mystery of Mamo	Soji Yoshikawa	Yasuo Yamada	Anime	
Mottomo Kiken na Yūgi				
Panic High School	Sōgo Ishii, Yukihiro Sawada	Atsuko Asano, Hideaki Esumi, Minoru Uchida	Suspense, action	
Ringing Bell	Masami Hata	Minori Matsushima; Akira Kamiya	Anime	
Satsujin Yūgi				
Shogun's Samurai	Kinji Fukasaku	Sonny Chiba; Hiroyuki Sanada	Samurai	
Rope Cosmetology	Shōgorō Nishimura	Naomi Tani	Roman porno	
Rope Hell	Kōyū Ohara	Naomi Tani	Roman porno	
Stage-Struck Tora-san	Yoji Yamada	Kiyoshi Atsumi	Comedy	21st in the Otoko wa Tsurai yo series
Talk of the Town Tora-san	Yoji Yamada	Kiyoshi Atsumi	Comedy	22nd in the Otoko wa Tsurai yo series
Winter's Flower	Yasuo Furuhata	Susumu Fujita; Mitsuko Baisho	Crime; Drama	

== See also ==
- 1978 in Japan
- 1978 in Japanese television
