= List of Japanese films of 1977 =

A list of films released in Japan in 1977 (see 1977 in film).

== Box-office ranking ==
Rank	Title	Director	Cast	Box office
1	Mount Hakkoda	Shirō Moritani	Ken Takakura	¥2.5 billion
2	Proof of the Man	Junya Sato	Yūsaku Matsuda	¥2.25 billion
3	Village of the Eight Tombs	Yoshitarō Nomura	Kiyoshi Atsumi	¥1.98 billion
4	Torakku Yarō 4: Tenka Gomen	Norifumi Suzuki	Bunta Sugawara	¥1.28 billion
5	Torakku Yarō 5: Dokyō Ichibanboshi	Norifumi Suzuki	Bunta Sugawara	¥1.09 billion

== List of films ==
Title	Director	Cast	Genre	Notes
1977
Akuma no temari-uta	Kon Ichikawa		—N/a	
The Alaska Story	Hiromichi Horikawa	Kinya Jitaoji, Kyoko Mitsubayashi, Eiji Okada	—N/a	
Ballad of Orin	Masahiro Shinoda	Shima Iwashita, Yoshio Harada, Tomoko Naraoka		
The Devil's Bouncing Ball Song	Kon Ichikawa, Osamu Tanaka	Koji Ishizaka, Keiko Kishi, Koji Kita	—N/a	
Doberman Deka	Kinji Fukasaku		Action	
Enban senso – Ban kitto	Takeharu Kidaka	Eiji Okada, Yukei Tanabe, Akinori Umezu	—N/a	
Erotic Diary of an Office Lady	Noboru Tanaka	Asami Ogawa	Roman porno	
Fairy in a Cage	Kōyū Ohara	Naomi Tani	Roman porno	
The Far Road	Sachiko Hidari	Sachiko Hidari		Entered into the 28th Berlin International Film Festival
Fascination: Portrait of a Lady	Kōyū Ohara	Naomi Tani	Roman porno	
The Gate of Youth – Part II	Kirio Urayama	Ken Tanaka, Shinobu Otake, Ayumi Ishida	—N/a	
The Hobbit	Arthur Rankin Jr., Jules Bass	Orson Bean, Richard Boone, Hans Conried, John Huston, Otto Preminger, Cyril Ritchard, Theodore	Animated musical	
Hakunetsu – deddo hiito	Katsushin Ishida	Jun Eto, Yuko Kotegawa, Jun Fubuki	—N/a	
Hokuriku Proxy War	Kinji Fukasaku		Crime, Drama	
House	Nobuhiko Obayashi	Kimiko Ikegami; Kumiko Oba	Horror	
JAKQ Dengeki Tai			Action for children	Movie version of JAKQ Dengeki Tai Episode 7.
Jigoku no tenshi: Akai bakuon	Makoto Naitô			
Kozure Satsujinken	Kazuhiko Yamaguchi	Shinichi Chiba, Tatsuo Umemiya, Isao Natsuygi		
Lady Chatterley In Tokyo	Katsuhiko Fujii	Izumi Shima	Roman porno	
Legend of Dinosaurs & Monster Birds	Junji Kurata		Science fiction	
The Life of Chikuzan	Kaneto Shindo			Entered into the 10th Moscow International Film Festival
Manga – Nippon Makashi Banashi – Momotaro	Yasunori Kawauchi, Takao Kodama		—N/a	
Proof of the Man				
Kyojin–gun monogatari-Susume!! Eiko e	Tadao Sawashima	Sadaharu Oh, Shigeo Nagashima	Documentary	
Seinen no ki	Kiyoshi Nishimura	Tomokazu Miura, Fumi Dan, Yumeji Tuskioka	—N/a	
A Tale of Sorrow and Sadness	Seijun Suzuki	Yoko Shiraki; Yoshio Harada	Drama	
Tattooed Flower Vase	Masaru Konuma	Naomi Tani	Roman porno	
Tora-san Meets His Lordship	Yoji Yamada	Kiyoshi Atsumi	Comedy	19th in the Otoko wa Tsurai yo series
Tora-san Plays Cupid	Yoji Yamada	Kiyoshi Atsumi	Comedy	20th in the Otoko wa Tsurai yo series
Wakai hito	Yoshihiro Kawarazaki	Junko Sakurada, Akira Onodera, Kyoko Hayashi	—N/a	
The War in Space	Jun Fukuda	Kensaku Morita; Yūko Asano	Tokusatsu	
Yatta Man	Eiji Tanaka		—N/a	
The Yellow Handkerchief	Yoji Yamada	Ken Takakura		Japan Academy Prize for Best Film

== See also ==
- 1977 in Japan
- 1977 in Japanese television

== Notes ==
=== References ===
- Galbraith IV, Stuart (2008). The Toho Studios Story: A History and Complete Filmography. Scarecrow Press. ISBN 978-1461673743.
