= Ryoko Watanabe =

Japanese pink film actress

- Born: July 15, 1961 (age 64); Hamamatsu, Japan
- Other name: Yoshiko Watanabe
- Occupations: glamour model; pink film actress

Ryoko Watanabe (渡辺 良子, Watanabe Ryōko) is a Japanese 1980s pink film actress and model who is best known for her Nikkatsu Roman Porno films in the period 1982–1985.

== Career ==
Watanabe came under exclusive contract with Nikkatsu and made her studio debut as the lead role in an Atsushi Fujiura entry in the ama sex comedy series, Marked Ama: Stirred-Up Shell (くいこみ海女 乱れ貝, Kuikomi ama: midaregai) released on 9 July 1982. Watanabe had a prolific Nikkatsu career, playing both lead and supporting roles in a wide range of Roman Porno films. With her athletic build, she was also a popular glamour model and had appearances in "image videos" as well as photo-books.

== Filmography ==
=== Nikkatsu ===
Title	Release date	Director	Notes
Marked Ama: Stirred-Up Shell くいこみ海女 乱れ貝	1982	Atsushi Fujiura	
Gigolo: A Docu-drama 実録色事師 ザ・ジゴロ	1982	Kōyū Ohara	
Pink Cut: Love Me Big, Love Me Deep ピンクカット 太く愛して深く愛して	1983	Yoshimitsu Morita	starring Mayumi Terashima
Anne's Diary あんねの日記	1983	Yasuhiro Kitahata	starring Mitiko Komori
Debauchery 猟色	1983	Hidehirō Itō	
Female Prisoner: Cage 女囚 檻	1983	Masaru Konuma	starring Mina Asami
Beautiful Wrestlers: Down for the Count 美少女プロレス 失神10秒前	1984	Hiroyuki Nasu	starring Natsuko Yamamoto
Brutal! Girl Talent 残酷! 少女タレント	1984	Yasuaki Uegai	starring Yuka Kakumi
Debauchery: Salome's Lips 猟色 サロメの唇	1984	Katsuhiko Fujii	
High School Teacher: Maturing 高校教師 成熟	1985	Shōgorō Nishimura	starring Rei Akasaka
Wives' Rape Mansion 人妻暴行マンション	1985	Nobuyuki Saitō	

=== Videos ===
Title	Release date	Studio	Notes
Lesbian Stewardess スチュワーデス・レズ	1984	Nikkatsu Video	
Paradise Dream パラダイスドリーム	1984	Japan Video	image video
LOVE in LOVE	1984	Fukuro Video Pack	image video
Adult Actresses Directory Part 1: Yasuko Yagami, Mina Asami, Ryoko Watanabe, Mari Uemura アダルト女優名鑑 ＰＡＲＴ１ 他女優：八神康子、浅見美那、渡辺良子. 植村マリ	1984	Fukuro Video Pack	image video
Perverted Games: Dream Sex 倒錯遊戯 ドリームセック	1985	Nippon Audio	
DO-T AID	1985	VAP Video	image video also featuring Harumi Fukano, Yasuko Yagami, Eve, Kazumi Sawada, Natsumi Asano

=== Hong Kong ===
Title	Release date	Director	Studio	Notes
The Strange Bedfellow 兩公婆八條心	1986	Eric Tsang; Alfred Cheung	Golden Harvest	comedy - science fiction as Yoshiko Watanabe (渡邊良子)

== Photo-books ==
- 渡辺良子写真集 光と影, Kindaieigasha, 25 January 1983.
- にっかつロマンポルノ女優六人集「ひ・め・ご・と, Tatsumi Publishing, 10 April 1984, featuring Nikkatsu actresses Ryoko Watanabe, Natsuko Yamamoto, Kaoru Oda, Kate Asabuki, Mina Asami, Kaori Okamoto.
