= 1977 in Japan =

- Decades: 1950s; 1960s; 1970s; 1980s; 1990s
- See also: Other events of 1977; History of Japan • Timeline • Years

Events in the year 1977 in Japan. It corresponds to Shōwa 52 (昭和52年) in the Japanese calendar.

== Incumbents ==
- Emperor: Hirohito
- Prime minister: Takeo Fukuda (Liberal Democratic)
- Chief Cabinet Secretary: Sunao Sonoda until November 28, Shintaro Abe
- Chief Justice of the Supreme Court: Ekizo Fujibayashi until August 25, Masao Okahara from August 26
- President of the House of Representatives: Shigeru Hori
- President of the House of Councillors: Kenzō Kōno until July 3, Ken Yasui from July 28
- Diet sessions: 80th (regular session opened on December 30, 1976, to June 9), 81st (extraordinary, July 27 to August 3), 82nd (extraordinary, September 29 to November 25), 83rd (extraordinary, December 7 to December 10), 84th (regular, December 19 to June 16, 1978)

=== Governors ===
- Aichi Prefecture: Yoshiaki Nakaya
- Akita Prefecture: Yūjirō Obata
- Aomori Prefecture: Shunkichi Takeuchi
- Chiba Prefecture: Kiichi Kawakami
- Ehime Prefecture: Haruki Shiraishi
- Fukui Prefecture: Heidayū Nakagawa
- Fukuoka Prefecture: Hikaru Kamei
- Fukushima Prefecture: Isao Matsudaira
- Gifu Prefecture: vacant (until 8 February); Yosuke Uematsu (starting 8 February)
- Gunma Prefecture: Ichiro Shimizu
- Hiroshima Prefecture: Hiroshi Miyazawa
- Hokkaido: Naohiro Dōgakinai
- Hyogo Prefecture: Tokitada Sakai
- Ibaraki Prefecture: Fujio Takeuchi
- Ishikawa Prefecture: Yōichi Nakanishi
- Iwate Prefecture: Tadashi Chida
- Kagawa Prefecture: Tadao Maekawa
- Kagoshima Prefecture: Saburō Kanemaru (until 3 February); Kaname Kamada (starting 3 March)
- Kanagawa Prefecture: Kazuji Nagasu
- Kochi Prefecture: Chikara Nakauchi
- Kumamoto Prefecture: Issei Sawada
- Kyoto Prefecture: Torazō Ninagawa
- Mie Prefecture: Ryōzō Tagawa
- Miyagi Prefecture: Sōichirō Yamamoto
- Miyazaki Prefecture: Hiroshi Kuroki
- Nagano Prefecture: Gon'ichirō Nishizawa
- Nagasaki Prefecture: Kan'ichi Kubo
- Nara Prefecture: Ryozo Okuda
- Niigata Prefecture: Takeo Kimi
- Oita Prefecture: Masaru Taki
- Okayama Prefecture: Shiro Nagano
- Okinawa Prefecture: Koichi Taira
- Osaka Prefecture: Ryōichi Kuroda
- Saga Prefecture: Sunao Ikeda
- Saitama Prefecture: Yawara Hata
- Shiga Prefecture: Masayoshi Takemura
- Shiname Prefecture: Seiji Tsunematsu
- Shizuoka Prefecture: Keizaburō Yamamoto
- Tochigi Prefecture: Yuzuru Funada
- Tokushima Prefecture: Yasunobu Takeichi
- Tokyo: Ryōkichi Minobe
- Tottori Prefecture: Kōzō Hirabayashi
- Toyama Prefecture: Kokichi Nakada
- Wakayama Prefecture: Shirō Kariya
- Yamagata Prefecture: Seiichirō Itagaki
- Yamaguchi Prefecture: Toru Hirai
- Yamanashi Prefecture: Kunio Tanabe

== Events ==
- January to February – According to Japan Fire and Disaster Management Agency, a widely heavy snow and avalanche, affective winter storm hit around nationwide, resulting to official confirmed report, total 101 person were human fatalities and 834 persons were wounded.
- January 4 – Poisoned cola is placed in a telephone booth near Shinagawa Station, killing two.
- March 3 – Japan Business Federation Attack Incident (経団連襲撃事件)
- June 15 – Outbreak of cholera in Arida, Wakayama prefecture.
- August 7 – Mount Usu erupts.
- September 9 – Typhoon Babe strikes Okinoerabujima.
- September 19 – Yutaka Kume is abducted by North Korean agents in Noto Peninsula – beginning of North Korean abductions of Japanese citizens.

== Births ==
- January 3 – Mayumi Iizuka, voice actress
- January 22 – Hidetoshi Nakata, footballer
- January 30 – Takahiro Arai, former professional baseball player
- February 10 – Morihiro Hashimoto, darts player (d. 2017)
- March 15 – Norifumi Yamamoto, mixed martial artist
- April 27 – Dai Fujikura, composer
- April 29 – Daisuke Amaya, indie game developer
- May 8 – Chiaki Takahashi, voice actress
- May 26 – Misaki Ito, actress
- June 22 – Ryōko Ono, voice actress
- June 25 – Naoya Tsukahara, gymnast
- June 26 – Tite Kubo, manga artist, creator of BLEACH
- August 13 – Miho Konishi, actress
- August 22 – Miho Kanno, actress and singer
- August 23 – Kenta Miyake, voice actor
- August 25 – Masumi Asano, voice actress
- August 30 – Sayori Ishizuka, voice actress
- September 6 – Kiyoshi Hikawa, enka singer
- September 15 – Angela Aki, singer-songwriter
- September 20 – Namie Amuro, singer
- September 23 – Nozomi Momoi, Japanese AV idol, and murder victim (d. 2002)
- September 25 – Atsushi Aoki, Japanese professional wrestler (d. 2019)
- October 1 – Christel Takigawa, television presenter
- December 6 – Miwa Yasuda, voice actress

== Deaths ==
- March 21 – Kinuyo Tanaka, actress (b. 1909)
- March 31 – Yasuji Kamada, photographer (b. 1883)
- December 19 – Takeo Kurita, admiral (b. 1889)

== See also ==
- 1977 in anime
- 1977 in Japanese television
- List of Japanese films of 1977
- 1977 in Japanese music
