= 1978 in Japanese television =

Events in 1978 in Japanese television.

== Debuts ==
Show	Station	Premiere date	Genre	Finale episode date
Ikkyū-san/Highschool Baseball Ninja	Fuji TV	April 10, 1978	Anime	October 23, 1978
Spider-Man	Tokyo Channel 12	May 17, 1978	Tokusatsu	March 14, 1979
The Yagyu Conspiracy	Kansai TV	October 3, 1978	Drama	June 26, 1979
Shine Ace o Nerae!	Nippon TV	October 14, 1978	Anime	March 31, 1979

== Ongoing shows ==
- Music Fair, music (1964–present)
- Mito Kōmon, jidaigeki (1969–2011)
- Sazae-san, anime (1969–present)
- Ōedo Sōsamō, anime (1970–1984)
- Ōoka Echizen, jidaigeki (1970–1999)
- Star Tanjō!, talent (1971–1983)
- FNS Music Festival, music (1974–present)
- Ikkyū-san, anime (1975–1982)
- Panel Quiz Attack 25, game show (1975–present)
- Candy Candy, anime (1976–1979)
- Yatterman, anime (1977–1979)

== Endings ==
Show	Station	End Date	Genre	Original Run
Dinosaur War Izenborg	Tokyo Channel 12	June 30	anime/tokusatsu	October 17, 1977 – June 30, 1978
Migoro! Tabegoro! Waraigoro!!	NET	March	variety	October 1976 – March 1978

== See also ==
- 1978 in anime
- 1978 in Japan
- List of Japanese films of 1978
