= Female Prisoner: Cage =

- Directed by: Masaru Konuma
- Written by: Osamu Murakami
- Produced by: Jun'ichi Sakurai
- Starring: Mina Asami
- Cinematography: Shohei Ando
- Edited by: Jun Nabeshima
- Distributed by: Nikkatsu
- Release date: September 16, 1983
- Running time: 68 min.
- Country: Japan
- Language: Japanese

Female Prisoner: Cage (女囚 檻, Joshū ori), also known by the Mondo Macabro DVD title Female Prisoner: Caged!, is a 1983 Japanese women in prison film in Nikkatsu's Roman porno series, directed by Masaru Konuma and starring Mina Asami.

== Plot ==
Masayo is a rebellious inmate at a female prison managed by a sadistic warden. The warden develops a special interest in Masayo and makes plans to have her subdued.

== Cast ==
- Mina Asami: Masayo
- Ryoko Watanabe: Kishiko, prison guard
- Nami Matsukawa: Saeko
- Shigeru Muroi: Miwa
- Keiko Aikawa: Shigeko
- Kiwako Izumi: Prison warden
