= Miho Konishi =

Japanese actress (born 1977)

- Born: 13 August 1977 (age 49); Motosu, Gifu, Japan
- Occupation: Actress
- Years active: 1998–present

Miho Konishi (小西 美帆, Konishi Miho; born 13 August 1977) is a Japanese actress.

== Biography ==
She started acting at high school at the age of 15 years. In 1997 she was selected from 1,789 actresses in auditions and debuted as the lead role in the NHK Asadora Yanchakure, televised nationally from 5 October 1998 to 3 April 1999, spanning 150 episodes. She has since appeared in many popular television and theatrical productions in Japan, including travel programmes and documentaries in more than 15 countries across the world. In 2007, she travelled to Sweden to interview Queen Silvia of Sweden about her commitment to work with dementia and care of the elderly. In addition to acting, since 2001 she has been learning Nihon Buyo (Japanese traditional dance) in the Fujima-ryū, the Iemoto of which is Fujima Kannemon, who is also a Japanese kabuki actor, appearing under the name Onoe Shoroku IV.

In December 2010, she moved to Germany.

== Television ==
- Asadora Yanchakure (NHK) 1998-1999
- Kinpachi-sensei Part 5 (TBS) 1999-2000
- Nekketsu! Shūsaku ga yuku (TV Asahi) 2000
- Wakaresase-ya (NTV) 2001
- Ten no Hitomi 2 (TV Asahi) 2001
- Emergency Room 24 hours Series 2 (CX) 2001
- Kinpachi-sensei Part 6 (TBS) 2001-2002
- Tokyo Story (Television drama remake) (CX) 2002
- Locker no hanako-san (NHK) 2002
- Mito Kōmon Part 32 (TBS) 2003
- Kaettekita Locker no hanako-san (NHK) 2003
- Taiga dorama Shinsengumi! (NHK) 2004
- The Kawasemi Inn Season 2 (NHK) 2004
- Mito Kōmon Part 33 (TBS) 2004
- Kinpachi-sensei Part 7 (TBS) 2004-2005
- anego (NTV) 2005
- THE WINDS OF GOD (TV Asahi) 2005
- The Kawasemi Inn Season 3 (NHK) 2005
- Kindaichi Case Files (NTV) 2005
- Mei-bugyō! Ōoka Echizen (TV Asahi) 2006
- Keishichō Sōsa-ikka 9 gakari Season 1 (TV Asahi) 2006
- Mito Kōmon Part 36 (TBS) 2006
- Asadora Imo Tako Nankin (NHK) 2006-2007
- Danryū (MBS) 2007
- C.A. to Oyobi! (NTV) 2007
- Mop Girl (TV Asahi) 2007
- Aibou Season 6 (TV Asahi) 2007
- Hataraki Man (NTV) 2007
- Genjūrō hissatsu-ken (TV Tokyo) 2008
- Saturday Night at the Mysteries (ABC) 2008
- Omiya-san Season 6 (TV Asahi) 2009
- Ochaberi (MBS) 2009
- Konkatsu! (CX) 2009
- Saisei no Machi (NHK) 2009
- ROMES 06 (NHK) 2009
- Saturday Night at the Mysteries (ABC) 2010
- Tōbō Bengoshi (CX) 2010
- Keishichō Sōsa-ikka 9 gakari Season 5 (TV Asahi) 2010
- Hotaru no Hikari 2 (NTV) 2010

== Film ==
- Hotaru no Hikari the movie (location in Rome Italy) 2012

== Theatre ==
- Tokyo Sundance (Theatre Cocoon, Osaka Kintetsu Theatre, Fukuoka Mielparque Hall) Feb.-Mar. 2001
- Boeing-Boeing (The Globe Tokyo Theatre, Osaka Kintetsu Theatre) Jun.-Jul. 2003
- Star tanjo (Aoyama Theatre) Mar.-Apr. 2004
- Cho-jin (Shimokitazawa Honda Theatre, Osaka Wahha-Kamikata Wahha Hall, Yamatokōriyama kōriyama-jo Hall, Shiga-ken-ritsu Kusatsu Bunka-Geizyutsu-Kaikan) Sep.-Oct. 2004
- Tsubame no iru Eki (The Globe Tokyo Theatre, Osaka Kousei-nenkin-Kaikan Geizyutsu Hall) Sep.-Oct. 2005
- Sakura no Sono (Aoyama round Theatre) Jun.-Jul. 2007
- Love 30 vol.2 (PARCO Theatre, Aichi-ken Kinro-Kaikan, Osaka Theatre Drama City) Aug.-Sep. 2007
- Genroku Meoto Gassen ~Ogata Kōrin and Tayo~ (Osaka Shin-Kabuki-za, Chunichi Theatre, Meiji-za)) Apr. and Jul.-Aug. 2008
- Sakura no Sono (Aoyama round Theatre) Apr. 2009
- Roules of La Cosa Nostra (Shinjuku Theatre Molière) Oct. 2010
- Yoshimoto 100nen Monogatari (Namba ground Kagetsu) Oct. 2012

== Concert ==
- Tokyo Philharmonic Orchestra ~Tokyo Opera City Grand Concert Series~ 「Kodomo On・Gaku・Kan 2005」(Tokyo Opera City Concert Hall) 2005

== Narration for Documentary ==
- Yakusoku ~Nihon-Ichi no Dam ga ubau mono~ Awarded a FNS Documentary Award and nominated for Galaxy Award (Tōkai Television Broadcasting) 2007

== Radio Drama ==
- Sound drive (NHK FM) 2003
- Fushigi-ya Tosyo-kan (NHK FM) 2004
- Sayonara Birthday (NHK FM) 2006
- Sensuikan Kazoku (NHK FM) 2009

== Mobile Phone TV Drama ==
- Kamiji Yusuke no Genki no deru Koi (Bee-TV) 2009
