= Rope and Breasts =

- Theatrical poster for Rope and Breasts (1983)
- Directed by: Masaru Konuma
- Written by: Eizō Uji
- Produced by: Yoshiyuki Unno
- Starring: Nami Matsukawa
- Cinematography: Teio Noda
- Edited by: Shinji Yamada
- Music by: Hachirō Kai
- Distributed by: Nikkatsu
- Release date: January 7, 1983
- Running time: 69 min.
- Country: Japan
- Language: Japanese

Rope and Breasts (縄と乳房, Nawa to chibusa) is a 1983 Japanese film in Nikkatsu's Roman porno series, directed by Masaru Konuma and starring Nami Matsukawa.

== Synopsis ==
Sayo is running a travelling SM show with her husband, where she plays the bottom, and gets increasingly bored with her life. During their tour in Kyoto, they are arranged by a well-off couple who ask for a private show, without knowing that they will eventually be forced for the "real thing".

== Cast ==
- Nami Matsukawa: Sayo Mayuzumi
- Ryōsei Tayama: Isao, Sayo's husband
- Kazuyuki Senba: Kenzo Kawamura
- Izumi Shima: Taeko, Kawamura's wife
- Akira Takahashi: Strip club owner
- Izumi Sagawa: Girl at Kiyomizu-dera
- Yōichi Takabayashi: Man in kimono (with the girl)
- Saburō Shōji: Kawamura's contact

== Critical appraisal ==
In their Japanese Cinema Encyclopedia: The Sex Films, the Weissers write that with Rope and Breasts, director Konuma has taken the S&M theme—which he pioneered in Nikkatsu's with Afternoon Affair: Kyoto Holy Tapestry (1973)-- to the level of exploitation. In this film, they judge, nudity, bondage, and torture have taken place of a story. Rather than the interesting plotting found in some of Konuma's previous works, the film is a series of set-pieces. "The most salacious finds beautiful Nami Matsukawa floating in a large goldfish bowl as she empties her bowels for the leering crowd of old geezers."

As Jasper Sharp describes this scene, Matsukawa is given an enema, and then forced into the fishbowl. "She quivers for several moments as she is forced to hold it in, before violently releasing the viscous fluid into the waters, as the spectators stare on mesmerised in a mixture of curiosity and awe, like kids at a birthday party watching a clown conjuring up balloon animals." Sharp uses this scene to illustrate the nature of the softcore genre in Japan. Because of the censorship, we cannot be sure into which orifice the enema is inserted. "Though perverse," he writes, "this scene is not particularly explicit."

== Availability ==
Rope and Breasts was released on DVD in Japan on February 23, 2006, as part of Geneon's fourth wave of Nikkatsu Roman porno series.

== Bibliography ==
=== English ===
- Nawa to chibusa (1983) at IMDb
- "NAWA TO CHIBUSA". Complete Index to World Film.
- Sharp, Jasper (2008). Behind the Pink Curtain: The Complete History of Japanese Sex Cinema. Guildford: FAB Press. ISBN 978-1-903254-54-7.
- Weisser, Thomas; Yuko Mihara Weisser (1998). Japanese Cinema Encyclopedia: The Sex Films. Miami: Vital Books : Asian Cult Cinema Publications. ISBN 1-889288-52-7.

=== Japanese ===
- 縄と乳房(1983) (in Japanese). allcinema.net.
- "縄と乳房". Japanese Cinema Database (Agency for Cultural Affairs).
- 縄と乳房 (in Japanese). Japanese Movie Database.
- 縄と乳房 (in Japanese). www.walkerplus.com.
