= 1977 in Japanese television =

Events in 1977 in Japanese television.

== Debuts ==
Show	Station	Premiere Date	Genre	Original Run
Daitetsujin 17	MBS	March 18	tokusatsu	March 18, 1977 – November 11, 1977
Dinosaur War Izenborg	Tokyo Channel 12	October 17	anime	October 17, 1977 – June 30, 1978
J.A.K.Q. Dengekitai	TV Asahi	April 9	tokusatsu	April 9, 1977 – December 24, 1977
Kaiketsu Zubat	Tokyo Channel 12	February 2	tokusatsu	February 2, 1977 – September 28, 1977
Little Superman Ganbaron	Nippon TV	April 3	tokusatsu	April 3, 1977 – December 24, 1977
Time Bokan Series Yatterman	Fuji TV	January 1	anime	January 1, 1977 – January 27, 1979

== Ongoing shows ==
- Music Fair, music (1964–present)
- Mito Kōmon, jidaigeki (1969–2011)
- Sazae-san, anime (1969–present)
- Ōedo Sōsamō, anime (1970–1984)
- Ōoka Echizen, jidaigeki (1970–1999)
- Star Tanjō!, talent (1971–1983)
- FNS Music Festival, music (1974–present)
- Ikkyū-san, anime (1975–1982)
- Panel Quiz Attack 25, game show (1975–present)
- Migoro! Tabegoro! Waraigoro!!, variety (1976–1978)
- Candy Candy, anime (1976–1979)

== Endings ==
Show	Station	Ending Date	Genre	Original Run
Blocker Gundan 4 Machine Blaster	Fuji TV	March 28	anime	July 5, 1976 – March 28, 1977
Chōdenji Robo Combattler V	TV Asahi	May 28	anime	October 7, 1976 – March 31, 1977
Daikuu Maryuu Gaiking	Fuji TV	January 27	anime	January 1, 1976 – January 27, 1977
Daitetsujin 17	MBS	November 11	tokusatsu	March 18, 1977 – November 11, 1977
Ganbare!! Robocon	NET	March 25	tokusatsu	October 4, 1974 – March 25, 1977
Groizer X	Tokyo Channel 12	March 31	anime	July 1, 1976 – March 31, 1977
Himitsu Sentai Gorenger	NET	March 26	tokusatsu	April 5, 1975 – March 26, 1977
J.A.K.Q. Dengekitai	TV Asahi	December 24	tokusatsu	April 9, 1977 – December 24, 1977
Kaiketsu Zubat	Tokyo Channel 12	September 28	tokusatsu	February 2, 1977 – September 28, 1977
Little Superman Ganbaron	Nippon TV	December 24	tokusatsu	April 3, 1977 – December 24, 1977
Ninja Captor	Tokyo Channel 12	January 26	tokusatsu	April 7, 1976 – January 26, 1977
Piccolino no Bōken	TV Asahi	May 31	anime	April 27, 1976 – May 31, 1977
Space Ironman Kyodain	MBS	March 11	tokusatsu	April 2, 1976 – March 11, 1977

== See also ==
- 1977 in anime
- 1977 in Japan
- List of Japanese films of 1977
