= Mina Asami =

Japanese pink film actress

- Born: December 2, 1958 (age 67); Saitama
- Years active: 1979-1990

Mina Asami (浅見 美那, Asami Mina; born December 2, 1958) is a Japanese TV actress and former pink film actress.

== Life and career ==
Asami was born in Saitama, and made her screen debut in a small role in Teruo Ishii's Boryoku senshi (暴力戦士) released in October 1979 by Toei. She primarily rose to prominence in six Nikkatsu Roman Porno films in the period 1983–1984. In the 1983 Roman porno Erotic Confessions, she played the role of a farmer's daughter stranded with a group of sex hungry travelers by a flood in this Edo period historical film by Shōgorō Nishimura. In the 1984 White Uniform Story: Molestation!, Asami plays a nurse brutalized by a psychotic patient. According to film critics Thomas and Yuko Weisser, she "plays a wide-eyed perky virgin impeccably". In her final film for Nikkatsu, Asami starred in the improbable College Girls' Dormitory vs Nurse School Students' Dormitory, which the Weissers call pleasant but "ultimately very dumb".

Moving into mainstream film, Asami had a small role in the June 1986 costume drama/comedy The Shogunate's Harem (大奥十八景, Ōoku jūhakkei). More notable was her taking on the dual roles of twin sisters Princess Ial and Princess Igam in the Super Sentai tokusatsu TV series Hikari Sentai Maskman which ran in 51 episodes from February 1987 to February 1988.

== Nikkatsu filmography ==
- Porn Star Applicants (ポルノ女優志願, Poruno Joyū Shigan), (April 1983) Kōyū Ohara
- Erotic Confessions (色ざんげ, Iro zange), (June 1983), directed by Shōgorō Nishimura
- Female Prisoner: Cage (女囚 檻, Joshū ori), (September 1983), directed by Masaru Konuma
- White Uniform Story: Molestation! (白衣物語 淫す！, Hakui monogatari Midasu!), (March 1984), directed by Hidehirō Itō
- Jun Marumo's Slut Legend (丸茂ジュンの痴女伝説, Marumo Jun no Chijo Densetsu), (June 1984), directed by Shōgorō Nishimura
- College Girls' Dormitory vs Nurse School Students' Dormitory (女子大寮VS看護婦学園寮, Joshidai-ryō vs kango gakuen-ryō), (September 1984), directed by Nobuyuki Saitō
