= Hikari Sentai Maskman =

Television series

- Genre: Tokusatsu; Superhero fiction Science Fantasy
- Created by: Toei Company
- Developed by: Hirohisa Soda
- Written by: Hirohisa Soda
- Directed by: Takao Nagaishi
- Starring: Ryousuke Kaizu; Kouichi Kusakari; Issei Hirota; Yuki Nagata; Kanako Maeda; Hayato Tani; Mina Asami; Keijiro Shiga; Kaori Kubota; Shunta Fuchino
- Narrated by: Hiroshi Takeda
- Opening theme: "Hikari Sentai Maskman" by Hironobu Kageyama
- Ending theme: "Ai no Soldier" by Hironobu Kageyama
- Composer: Goro Omi
- Country of origin: Japan
- No. of episodes: 51 (list of episodes)

Production
- Producers: Kanetake Ochiai; Takeyuki Suzuki; Kyōzō Utsunomiya
- Running time: 30 minutes
- Production companies: TV Asahi; Toei Company; Toei Advertising

Original release
- Network: ANN (TV Asahi)
- Release: February 28, 1987 – February 20, 1988

Related
- Choushinsei Flashman; Choujyu Sentai Liveman

Hikari Sentai Maskman (光戦隊マスクマン, Hikari Sentai Masukuman; Light Squadron Maskman) is a Japanese television tokusatsu series broadcast by TV Asahi. The series is the 11th installment of Super Sentai. Directed by Takao Nagaishi, it stars Ryousuke Kaizu, Kouichi Kusakari, Issei Hirota, Yuki Nagata, Kanako Maeda, Hayato Tani, Mina Asami, Keijiro Shiga, Kaori Kubota and Shunta Fuchino. It aired from February 28, 1987 to February 20, 1988, replacing Choushinsei Flashman and was replaced by Choujyu Sentai Liveman. Its international English title as listed by Toei is simply Maskman.

== Plot ==
Commander Sugata is a scientist and sage who excels in mental reinforcements and is a master of every martial arts discipline. He discovered the existence of the Underground Empire Tube, a once peaceful kingdom that has turned into a malignant force under the mysterious Zeba, who desires to conquer the surface. In order to stand against them and thwart their plans, Sugata recruits five young people to become the Maskmen. Each becomes specialized in a style of martial arts, and Sugata teaches them the ways of the mystical Aura Power (オーラパワー, Ōra Pawa). A year after Sugata recruits and trains the Maskmen, the Underground Empire Tube is ready to strike. Princess Ial of the deposed Igam Royal Family, sent to spy above ground as Mio, falls in love with Takeru, and wishes for those underground and above ground to coexist. She is kidnapped and imprisoned in ice for her betrayal. As Takeru and the Maskmen battle Tube, they learn about Ial and Igam's relationship, and a terrible dark secret about Zeba, the Tube leader.

== Characters ==
=== Maskmen ===
The Maskmen transformed. From left to right: Kenta, Haruka, Takeru, Momoko, and Akira.

The eponymous Maskmen is the top secret fighting force formed by Sanjuro Sugata. Before Tube surfaced, the group posed as the pit crew of the Sugata Racing Team.

- Takeru (タケル): The 23-year-old leader of the group who fights as Red Mask (レッドマスク, Reddo Masuku). He is a specialist in Karate and a motor racing driver. He was spotted by Sugata a year prior to the beginning of the series while he saved a mother's infant from being crushed in the railway. Sugata later offered him a spot on the Maskmen. His love for Mio and desire to find her are his motivations. While in Otaki, Takeru meets Norio through whom he masters the "God Hand" technique. Igam tries to eliminate him by travelling into the past. Near the end of the series, he single-handedly defeats Baraba out of rage in battle. He reunites with Mio in the end but he is forced to split up with her.
- Kenta (ケンタ): The 21-year-old second-in-command of the team who fights as Black Mask (ブラックマスク, Burakku Masuku). He specializes in Kobudo. He is shy around women but can be a playboy at times. He is lighthearted, strong, and dependable. When a Dogler Beast stole the Aura Power of the other Maskmen, Kenta was the only one left who could fight. He worked as a mechanic for the Sugata Racing Team and once worked for the Sun Racing Team.
- Akira (アキラ): The youngest member of the group at 16 who fights as Blue Mask (ブル-マスク, Burū Masuku). He is an expert in Chinese Kung-Fu and a Jian (straight sword) expert. His father died while he was young and he was an only child. He moved to Tokyo in order to perfect his martial arts ability and to join the Maskmen. Akira unknowingly enters a Tube-rigged tournament. He wants to win to prove to his mother that he is successful in his chosen pursuit. Always cheerful, he loves apples and the idol Youko Minamino. Late in the series, he turns evil after being possessed by the spirit of a swordsman of the Royal Underground Empire named Imperial Underground Fencer Unas (地帝剣士ウナス, Chitei Kenshi Unasu). Unas was resurrected by some of the Royal Underground slaves of Tube in hopes that he would help set them free from Zeba's tyrannical rule. The underground slaves mistake Akira as a reincarnation of Unas. During the events of Kaizoku Sentai Gokaiger, Akira would appear to grant the Greater Power of the Maskmen to the Gokaigers. The Aura Power would later allow the Gokaigers to use the Aura in their attack Gokai Aura Galaxy.
- Haruka (ハルカ): A 19-year-old kunoichi (female ninja) who fights as Yellow Mask (イエローマスク, Ierō Masuku). She was raised in a family of ninja, brought up to carry the tradition at the cost of a happy childhood. Forced by her father to abandon all feminine things to focus on her ninja training, she appears tomboyish and is a fierce fighter. She is highly intelligent and loves dancing as she tutors a young girl who is unable to afford dance lessons.
- Momoko (モモコ): A 19-year-old expert in tai chi and is also strong and dedicated who fights as Pink Mask (ピンクマスク, Pinku Masuku). A young woman with a pure heart, she often teaches tai chi to young people. She once, by chance, met Ial and Igam's mother, who gave her the saintly flower known as Carollove. Momoko treasures it because it saved her when she fell underground as a child. The first four letters of her name is the kanji for her color designation.

==== Allies ====
- Commander Sanjuro Sugata (姿 三十郎 長官, Sugata Sanjūrō-chōkan): Sugata is a scientist and martial artist who formed the Maskmen. He is a wise man who excels in mental reinforcements and every martial art. Sugata was the one learned of Tube's existence and their plot to conquer the surface world. A mysterious man, Sugata fights against Takeru the year before he was chosen to become Red Mask. He is the owner of Sugata Racing, a motoring team for which Takeru is a driver and Kenta once worked as an engineer.
- Doctor Azuma (東 博士, Azuma-hakase): Sugata's assistant; she works in the computer room and monitors the performance of the Maskmen.
- Doctor Catherine (ドクター・カトリーヌ, Dokutā Katorīnu): A Caucasian woman who assists Commander Sugata alongside Doctor Azuma.
- Yu (ユウ, Yū): The daughter of Ijin of the Fu Clan, Yu is a rogue ninja who works to find any Tube relics that would reveal the true identity of Zeba.
- Lelai (レライ, Rerai): A mermaid from the Sea of Tears, an underground lake formed from human tears over the millennia. Having a lovely singing voice, Igum deceives Lelai as part of a scheme involving Horn Doggler. Once Lelai learns the truth, she is forced to sing after Igum caused the Sea of Tears to dry up. Takeru manages to save her and takes her to the ocean to keep her alive.
- Doctor Akira Yamagata (山形 晃 博士, Yamagata Akira-hakase): The deceased creator of the Galaxy Robo and a close friend of Chief Sugata. During the early development of the M-Project, Yamagata built the Galaxy Robo by himself in order to provide the future Maskman team with another robot in addition to the Great Five of Sugata. However, he died during a freak accident while testing out the Galaxy Robo. Doctor Yamagata is survived by his only daughter, Yumi (由美), who believes that the Galaxy Robo, which was programmed with a free will, was responsible for the death of her father. However, Yamagata's recording during his final test run with the Galaxy Robo proves that his death was entirely accidental and was not the fault of the Galaxy Robo.
- Akaike (赤池): The chief designer of the Jet Cannon. He loses consciousness as the final tests begin, due to the long term effects of Deathga Doggler's attack when he was a child.
- Kurokawa (黒川): A member of the Jet Cannon development staff who assists Akaike. He is played by Kazuhiko Nishimura, who would go on to play Jō Ōhara in Chōjū Sentai Liveman.
- Ryo Asuka (飛鳥 リョー, Asuka Ryō): A former disciple of Chief Sugata who was chosen to be part of the M-Project, which gave him the ability to transform into X1 Mask (X1マスク, Ekkusu Wan Masuku), a predecessor to the main Maskman team. However, Ryo abandoned Sugata's unit after his girlfriend Yūko (ユウコ) was killed during an ambush by Tube, causing Ryo to doubt his ability to protect the world since he was unable to protect the woman he loved. Ryo arrives to help the Maskmen when they are overpowered by Magma Doggler. With Takeru's help, Ryo regain his self-confidence and assists the team in defeating Magma Doggler, but at the cost of his powers. At the end, he leaves the Maskmen to teach martial arts to children with a renewed sense of hope. He is also the first Sixth Hero, although it would not occur again until five years later in 1992, where Kyoryu Sentai Zyuranger introduced an official Sixth Hero.
- Mai Kozuki (40): A talented pianist who is actually from the Underground's Melme Family (メルメ), his music soothes the most savage of Underground monsters. Zeba orders the death of the family, and Mai is the sole survivor. Sugata saves her and brings her to the Maria Orphanage after rewriting her memories so she can live without her painful memories. Targeted by Bard Doggler, her hand is turned to stone and the Maskmen restore it.
- Ise (11, 44 & 45): A rogue underground dweller who, along with her brother Teto, is part of a cult that worships the Underground Knight Unas. Though disillusioned when Unas is controlled by Igum, she and her brother help the Maskmen return their friend to normal.

=== Underground Empire Tube ===
The Underground Empire Tube (地底帝国チューブ, Chitei Teikoku Chūbu) is a peaceful underground empire that came into being five millennia ago under the rule of the Igam family. Once it comes under the rule of the usurper Zeba, Tube begins preparing for war on the surface. They are based at the Underground Castle (地帝城, Chiteijō) until Zeba has it destroyed.

- Underground Emperor Zeba (地帝王ゼーバ, Chiteiō Zēba): Zeba is the leader of the underground Empire Tube. He hates all human beings and is a master of the Dark Aura, desiring to turn the surface into a cold and dark place. His true form is the monster Lethal Doggler The 2nd (リサールドグラーII世, Risārudogurā Nisei) whose father, the original Lethal Doggler, is killed by the Igam Family for terrorizing the underground. Before dying, it spawns an egg that results in Zeba's birth; the child devours his parent to become stronger. The new Lethal Doggler grows with nothing on his mind but revenge, disguising himself as Zeba and rule the Igum Royal Family. Upon assuming the throne, Zeba corrupts the underground into a violent kingdom and enslaves the underground humans. When he learns that his defeat was foretold to be at the hands of the surviving twin daughters of the Igum family, he keeps them apart while taking measures to ensure no one learns about his true identity, momentarily assumes his true form whenever someone gets too close to the truth. With Ial revived and his identity revealed, Zeba quickly enacts his final plan to raise the Underground Castle and spread his Dark Aura around the world to usher in an age of darkness at the cost of his followers. Once on the surface, Zeba battles the Maskmen personally in his Dark Aura domain. However, Ial and Igam augment their powers with the Maskmen's to negate his Dark Aura. Forced back into his true form, the Lethal Doggler is blasted by the Jet Cannon at full power, using the energies from the weapon to enlarge himself before being finally destroyed by the Galaxy Robo.
- Underground Imperial Prince Igum (地帝王子イガム, Chiteiōshi Igamu): The older twin sister of Princess Ial, she is raised as a man to one day take the throne until Zeba overthrew her parents. As a result, Ial is spared to serve under Zeba as one of his prized warriors. She is trained in the way of combat by the Fu Clan and uses the dragon gauntlets on her forearms to execute attacks. When Ial falls in love with Takeru, Igum feels her sister is a disgrace to their family, and vows to kill Takeru. She also has a desire to kill Ial for her transgression, but she cannot carry it out under orders from Zeba himself. One of her attempts in killing Takeru involves conjuring the Death Ring, a family tradition where the user uses up their energy to project an electrified force field. When Baraba gains the Royal Underground Sword, Igum is forced to turn to the Igum Dragon for aid. When Akira is restored from being Unas, Igum's identity as a woman is revealed to the Maskmen. Takeru then hesitates to fight her and attempts to reason with her. After she is given permission to kill her sister, Igum learns the truth behind Zeba and is conflicted until she learns that he used her to achieve his goal. Disillusioned and seeing herself beyond redemption, Igam finds a new reason to live when she sees the Buddha as she helps the Maskmen defeat Zeba. Soon after, Igum becomes a Buddhist nun to repent for her sins and leaves her sister to become the new heir to the Igum Kingdom.
- Underground Curiosities Beast Anagmas (地奇地奇獣アナグマス, Chiki Chikijū Anagumasu): He is an overweight bat-like beast who is three centuries old and knows all, a master of dark arts who uses a croquet mallet as his weapon. As the advisor of Zeba, he is able to freely access the Underground Library, which contains the history of the Tube civilization. Normally remaining at the sidelines, Anagmas first reveals himself to the Maskmen prior to setting up a scheme to remove Great Five. Later, he learns the truth about Zeba and is sent to kill Ial. Anagmas is killed by the Maskmen with the Jet Cannon and the Galaxy Robo.
- Underground Imperial Commander Baraba (地帝指令バラバ, Chitei Shirei Baraba): A cold-blooded, sadistic and merciless skilled samurai and strongman of the Baluga tribe and is a rival of Igam. He carries a heavy blade called the Gigara Blade that is made from dinosaur bones which he is strong enough to use in battle. When sentenced to death by Zeba for his failure, he goes to the Underground Dungeon to kill the Devil Doggler and obtain the Royal Underground Sword. He lost the fight until he is driven mad by his mother's death at the hands of the monster, killing the monster with the Royal Underground Sword. Later, after failing to revive the War God, Baraba gets one last chance to redeem himself. He makes a deal with Kiros and kidnaps Princess Ial to lure Takeru into a trap. Once the plan falls apart, and Oyobu turns his back on him, Baraba is killed by Red Mask in a final duel.
- Underground Imperial Ninja Oyoboo (地帝忍オヨブー, Chiteinin Oyobū): An Oni-themed ninja of the Buyon tribe with red skin and large pointy ears who serves under Baraba. He can throw life-manifested fire from his hands and run at near-lightspeed. While pleading with his master not to take Ial, he ends up being frozen but manages to thaw himself out. Though he comes to the aid of his master, Oyobu refuses to aid Baraba in his final fight. Though he learns the truth about Zeba and discovers that he is nothing more than an expandable pawn, Oyobu continues his part in the fiend's plan in sacrificing the Underground Castle as he is consumed in the resulting explosion.
- Underground Imperial Ninja Fumin (地帝忍フーミン, Chiteinin Fūmin): A Kunoichi of the Fu clan, a group of ninja who have served under the Igam family for generations. She is able to shoot shurikens and fire from her mouth, Fumin's abilities rival those of Haruka. She assumes guises like that of the idol Marina Shimada during Igam's plan of turning humans into Unglers. Though she learns her mistress' identity, Fumin remains by Igam's side until she is killed in the Underground Castle while protecting Igam when the castle is being destroyed.
- Energy Beast Okelampa (エネルギー獣オケランパ, Enerugījū Okeranpa): A mole cricket/hermit crab-like creature that emerges when the monsters of the Tube Empire are defeated by the Maskmen. With its ray, the Doggler monsters are enlarged as Okelampa utters Phew, Oh goodness! (ふぅ〜、やれやれ, Fū, yareyare!) before taking his leave. The fate of Okelampa is never revealed.
- Ungler Soldiers (アングラー兵, Angurā Hei): The black-skinned foot soldiers with vines covering their faces. Their name derives from "underground".

==== Kiros ====
Thief Knight Kiros (盗賊騎士キロス, Tōzoku Kishi Kirosu) is a wandering undergrounder under no one's authority who is relentless in getting what he wants. Kiros sees Ial's beauty and attempts to make her his own. He saves her from Hell's Wind chasm but falls down into the pit. After managing to escape Hell's Wind by mastering the Crescent Screw, Kiros attacks the Maskmen, requesting Ial in exchange for aiding Tube. He learns about Takeru's relationship to Ial and Kiros became Igam's rival in trying to kill Red Mask. Kiros tricks Baraba and spirits Ial's frozen prison into Hell's Wind to break her free. Mortally wounded in an attempt to protect her, Kiros dies as he realizes that Ial is the only thing he could never have.

==== Earth Imperial Beasts Doggler ====
The Earth Imperial Beasts Doggler (地帝獣ドグラー, Chiteijū Dogurā) are a tribe of underground monsters that are released from a freezing cave by Underground Empire Tube to fight the Maskmen. A few of them consist of an Earth Imperial Doggler (地帝ドグラー, Chitei Dogurā) and a familiar called a Parasite (寄生獣, Kiseijū) that can combine into one Earth Imperial Beast Doggler. Energy Beast Okelampa would be the one to make the Earth Imperial Beasts Dogglers grow.

- Igua Doggler (イグアドグラー, Igua Dogurā): An iguana-themed Earth Imperial Doggler that has an alien-themed parasite called Igua (イグア, Igua).
- Capila Doggler (カビラドグラー, Kabira Dogurā): A flower-themed Earth Imperial Doggler that has a centipede-themed parasite called Capila (カビラ, Kabira) who was used by Underground Imperial Ninja Oyoboo.
- Skull Doggler (スカルドグラー, Sukarudogurā): A spider/caterpillar-themed Earth Imperial Doggler that has a skull-headed parasite called Skull (スカル, Sukaru) who was used by Underground Imperial Prince Igum.
- Drilla Doggler (ドリラドグラー, Dorira Dogurā): A mole/mole cricket-themed Earth Imperial Doggler used by Underground Imperial Commander Baraba.
- Doll Doggler (ドールドグラー, Dōru Dogurā): A giant aura-eating mollusk-themed Earth Imperial Doggler that has a mollusk-themed parasite called Doll (ドール, Dōru).
- Saber Doggler (サーベルドグラー, Sāberu Dogurā): A cryokinetic bird/beetle-themed Earth Imperial Doggler that was created by Underground Empire Tube.
- Magne Doggler (マグネドグラー, Magune Dogurā): An crab-themed Earth Imperial Doggler that has a crustacean-themed parasite called Magne (マグネ, Magune) who was used by Underground Imperial Commander Baraba.
- Bagil Doggler (バギルドグラー, Bagiru Dogurā): A demon-themed Earth Imperial Doggler that was used by Underground Imperial Commander Baraba.
- Zora Doggler (ゾーラドグラー, Zōra Dogurā): A Earth Imperial Doggler of indeterminate species.
- Shinobi Doggler (シノビドグラー, Shinobi Dogurā) is a ninja-themed Earth Imperial Doggler used by Underground Imperial Ninja Oyoboo and Underground Imperial Ninja Fumin.
- Garaga Doggler (ガラガドグラー, Garaga Dogurā): A plant/mollusk-themed Earth Imperial Doggler used by Underground Imperial Prince Igum.
- Akame Doggler (アカメドグラー, Akame Dogurā): A crab/insect-themed Earth Imperial Doggler used by Underground Imperial Ninja Oyoboo.
- Geruge Doggler (ゲルゲドグラー, Geruge Dogurā): A bee-themed Earth Imperial Doggler that has a flower-topped parasite called Geruge (ゲルゲ, Geruge) who was used by Underground Imperial Prince Igum.
- Gamaro Doggler (ガマロドグラー, Gamaro Dogurā): A mushroom-themed Earth Imperial Doggler used by Underground Imperial Commander Baraba.
- Giba Doggler (ギーバドグラー, Gība Dogurā): A clown-themed Earth Imperial Doggler used by Underground Imperial Prince Igum.
- Garubo Doggler (ガルボドグラー, Garubo Dogurā): An Earth Imperial Doggler that has a bloodthirsty turtle-like parasite called Garubo (ガルボ, Garubo) who was used by Underground Imperial Ninja Oyoboo.
- Igara Doggler (イガラドグラー, Igara Dogurā): A plant-themed Earth Imperial Doggler used by Underground Curiosities Beast Anagmas.
- Horn Doggler (ホーンドグラー, Hōn Dogurā): A fish/starfish-themed Earth Imperial Doggler who appears in Hikari Sentai Maskman: The Movie.
- Dokuro Doggler (ドクロドグラー, Dokuro Dogurā): A skeleton-themed Earth Imperial Doggler used by Undergroun Curiosities Beast Anagmas.
- Kimen Doggler (キメンドグラー, Kimen Dogurā): A horseshoe crab-themed Earth Imperial Doggler that has a horseshoe crab-themed parasite called Kimen (キメン, Kimen) used by Underground Imperial Prince Igum.
- Majin Doggler (マジンドグラー, Majin Dogurā): A powerful demon-themed Earth Imperial Doggler who was placed in a coffin and buried underground until it was summoned by Underground Curiosities Beast Anagmas.
- Ryu Doggler (リュウドグラー, Ryū Dogurā): A Japanese dragon/lamprey-themed Earth Imperial Doggler.
- Henge Doggler (ヘンゲドグラー, Henge Dogurā): A shapeshifting Bivalvia-themed Earth Imperial Doggler.
- Jiruga Doggler (ジルガドグラー, Jiruga Dogurā): A mantis-themed Earth Imperial Doggler used by Underground Imperial Commander Baraba.
- Beam Doggler (ベームドグラー, Bēmu Dogurā): A crab-themed Earth Imperial Doggler with horse-like arms who served as Kiros' steed.
- Rock Doggler (ロックドグラー, Rokku Dogurā): A rock-themed Earth Imperial Doggler from Hell's Wind who used by Kiros.
- Deathga Doggler (デスガドグラー, Desuga Dogurā): A deadly gas-emitting Earth Imperial Doggler used by Underground Emperor Zeba.
- Devil Doggler (デビルドグラー, Debiru Dogurā): A seahorse-themed Earth Imperial Doggler used by Underground Imperial Commander Baraba.
- Ragon Doggler (ラゴンドグラー, Ragon Dogurā): A Japanese dragon/shaman-themed Earth Imperial Doggler used by Underground Imperial Prince Igum.
- Lens Doggler (レンズドグラー, Renzu Dogurā): A lens-themed Earth Imperial Doggler used by Underground Imperial Commander Baraba.
- Gra Doggler (ゴーラドグラー, Gōra Dogurā): A gravity-manipulating Earth Imperial Doggler used by Kiros.
- Gigira Doggler (ギギラドグラー, Gigira Dogurā): An unspecified amphibian-themed Earth Imperial Doggler. It tried to kill Eiri before it was slain by Kiros.
- Guron Doggler (グロンドグラー, Guron Dogurā): A grotesque dinosaur-themed Earth Imperial Doggler used by Underground Imperial Prince Igum.
- Haniwa Doggler (ハニワドグラー, Haniwa Dogurā): A Haniwa-themed Earth Imperial Doggler that guarded Lethal Doggler's tomb and was used by Kiros.
- Nimen Doggler (ニメンドグラー, Nimen Dogurā): A mask-themed Earth Imperial Doggler.
- Mezume Doggler (メズメドグラー, Mezume Dogurā): A hypnotic bird-themed Earth Imperial Doggler who came from Hell's Wind and was used by Kiros.
- Dime Doggler (ダイムドグラー, Daimu Dogurā): A knight-themed Earth Imperial Doggler used by Underground Imperial Prince Igum.
- Magma Doggler (マグマドグラー, Maguma Dogurā): A magma-themed Earth Imperial Doggler used by Underground Imperial Commander Baraba.
- Bard Doggler (バルドドグラー, Barudodogurā): An unspecified crustacean-themed Earth Imperial Doggler that has an insect-themed parasite called Bard (バルド, Barudo) who was used by Underground Imperial Prince Igum.
- Hariga Doggler (ハリガドグラー, Hariga Dogurā): A thorn-covered Earth Imperial Doggler used by Kiros.
- Kinoga Doggler (キノガドグラー, Kinoga Dogurā): A mushroom-themed Earth Imperial Doggler.
- Gizee Doggler (ギゼードグラー, Gizē Dogurā): A Pharaoh-masked mummy-themed Earth Imperial Doggler used by Kiros.
- Yoroi Doggler (ヨロイドグラー, Yoroi Dogurā): A lizard-themed Earth Imperial Doggler wearing an Underground Knight's armor as a parasite who was used by Underground Imperial Prince Igum.
- Gamesu Doggler (ガメスドグラー, Gamesu Dogurā): A turtle-themed Earth Imperial Doggler.
- Godai Doggler (ゴダイドグラー, Godai Dogurā): An armour-themed Earth Imperial Doggler that once trained Underground Imperial Prince Igum to be a man and later comes to her aid when her identity was exposed.
- Spin Doggler (スピンドグラー, Supin Dogurā): A suit-themed Earth Imperial Doggler used by Underground Imperial Commander Baraba.
- Baruga Doggler (バルガドグラー, Baruga Dogurā): A crustacean/insectoid Earth Imperial Doggler used by Underground Imperial Commander Baraba.
- Jigoku Doggler (ジゴクドグラー, Jigoku Dogurā): A carnivorous plant-themed Earth Imperial Doggler and guardian of Hell's Wind.

==== Others ====
- Princess Ial (イアル姫, Iaru-hime): She is the twin sister of Igam, sent by Tube as a spy above ground under the name of Mio (美緒, Mio). Once on the surface, Ial meets and falls in love with Takeru. When Tube's forces are ready to attack, she warns Takeru, but is captured by Igua. Brought before Zeba, Ial is sentenced to the Eternal Freeze, living in an endless nightmare while encased in ice. Thanks to Kiros' actions, Ial is freed from her prison and helps the Maskmen destroy Zeba. She is forced to leave Takeru to fulfill her duties as the new empress, though she still has feelings for him. She has him promise to look towards the future.
- Lalaba (ララバ, Raraba): The mother of Baraba, who raised him on the ideologies of the Baluga tribe. She tricks Akira into taking her to his son. Laraba attacks the Devil Doggler and wounds the beast enough for her son to finish the job, though she dies by its hand. She was played by Machiko Soga who previously portrayed Queen Haedrian in the 1980 Series Denshi Sentai Denjiman and its 1981 Sequel Taiyou Sentai Sun Vulcan, and later Played Witch Bandora in the 1992's Kyōryū Sentai Zyuranger and Heavenly Arch Saint Magiel in 2005's Mahou Sentai Magiranger.
- Igum Dragon (イガム竜, Igamuryu): The Igan Family guardian who follows the will of an Igum clansman. It is revived by Igam to help her fight the Maskmen. Once Ial is revived, the Igam Dragon secretly aids her by giving her the water mirror ball containing the truth about Zeba.

== Episodes ==
1. The Mysterious, Beautiful Runaway (美しき謎の逃亡者, Utsukishiki Nazo no Tōbōsha)
2. Strange! The Dark Underground Castle (怪奇！ 闇の地底城, Kaiki! Yami no Chiteijō)
3. The First Step into the Unknown (未知への第一歩！, Michi e no Daiippo)
4. Burn! F1 Spirits! (燃やせ！ F1魂！, Moyase! Efu Wan Tamashii!)
5. The Small Swordsman, Blue (小さな剣士ブルー, Chiisa na Kenshi Burū)
6. The God Hand of Dreams (夢のゴッドハンド, Yume no Goddo Hando)
7. Explode! Kenta's Love (爆発！ケンタの愛, Bakuhatsu! Kenta no Ai)
8. Burn! The Flower's Sword (燃えろ！花の剣！, Moero! Hana no Ken!)
9. Combine! Aura of Life (合体！命のオーラ, Gattai! Inochi no Ōra)
10. Igam vs. Takeru (イガムVSタケル, Igamu Tai Takeru)
11. The Refugee From Underground (地底からの亡命者, Chitei Kara no Bōmeisha)
12. A Challenge! The Pride of a Shinobi (挑戦！忍びの誇り, Chōsen! Shinobi no Hokori)
13. Chase the Idol! (アイドルを追え！, Aidoru o Oe!)
14. The Great Escape to the Blue Sky! (青空への大脱出！, Aozora e no Dai Dasshutsu!)
15. Farewell, Dear Flower! (さらば愛しき花よ！, Saraba Itoshiki Hana yo!)
16. Deadly! Blazing Baraba (必殺！炎のバラバ, Hissatsu! Honō no Baraba)
17. Smash it! The Maze of Hell (破れ！地獄の迷宮, Yabure! Jigoku no Meikyū)
18. The Dear Bloodsucking Doll! (愛しの吸血人形！, Itoshi no Kyūketsu Ningyō!)
19. Phantom Magic! Anagumas (妖魔！ アナグマス, Yōma! Anagumasu)
20. A Trap! The Sinking Giant Robot (罠！ 沈む巨大ロボ, Wana! Shizumu Kyodai Robo)
21. The Black Shadow of the Misty Valley (霧の谷の黒い影, Kiri no Tani no Kuroi Kage)
22. The Winds and Clouds of an Aura Storm! (風雲オーラの嵐！, Fūun Ōra no Arashi!)
23. Mio Who Has Become a Demon (悪魔になった美緒, Akuma ni Natta Mio)
24. The Grotto of the Young Monster (鍾乳洞の少年怪獣, Shōnyūdō no Shōnen Kaijū)
25. Akira's Lover!? (アキラの恋人！？, Akira no Koibito!?)
26. A Life That Disappeared on the Hot Sand! (熱砂に消えた命！, Nessa ni Kieta Inochi!)
27. Thief Knight Kiros! (盗賊騎士キロス！, Tōzoku Kishi Kirosu!)
28. Mio is Princess Ial!? (美緒がイアル姫！？, Mio ga Iaru-hime!?)
29. The New Lethal Weapon of Friendship (友情の新必殺武器, Yūjō no Shin Hissatsu Buki)
30. Mama!! Baraba's Scream! (ママ！！バラバの絶叫！, Mama!! Baraba no Zekkyō!)
31. It Appears! The Guardian Deity Igam Dragon (出現！守護神イガム竜, Shutsugen! Shugoshin Igamuryū)
32. Oyobu's Lethal Dash (オヨブー必殺走り, Oyobū Hissatsu Hashiri)
33. Takeru!! Cut Through Love! (タケルよ！愛を斬れ！, Takeru yo! Ai o Kire!)
34. Blues of Love and Murderous Intent (愛と殺意のブルース, Ai to Satsui no Burūsu)
35. The Mystery of Zeba! The Forbidden Tomb (ゼーバの謎！ 禁断の墓, Zēba no Nazo! Kindan no Haka)
36. Elimination! The Destructive Twin Girls (消滅！双子の破壊少女, Shōmetsu! Futago no Hakai Shōjo)
37. Soldiers Who Bet on Their Dreams (夢に賭ける戦士たち, Yume ni Kakeru Senshitachi)
38. The Time to Erase Takeru (タケルが消される時間, Takeru ga Kesareru Jikan)
39. Revival! The Mysterious X1 Mask (復活！謎のX1マスク, Fukkatsu! Nazo no Ekkusu Wan Masuku)
40. Resurrect! The Melody of Love (甦れ！愛のメロディー, Yomigaere! Ai no Merodī)
41. Female Thieves Haruka & Momoko (女強盗ハルカ&モモコ, Onna Gōtō Haruka to Momoko)
42. Fly! The Poem of a Timid Boy (翔べ！いじけ少年の詩, Kakebe! Ijike Shōnen no Shi)
43. Akira Loses His Eyesight! The Mysterious Spell (アキラ失明！ 謎の呪文, Akira Shutsumei! Nazo no Jumon)
44. Transform! Underground Empire Swordsman Akira (変身！ 地帝剣士アキラ, Henshin! Chitei Kenshi Akira)
45. Prince Igam! You're a Woman! (イガム王子！君は女！, Igamu-ōji! Kimi wa Onna!)
46. Counterattack! The Secret of the Demon Pond (逆襲！魔の池の秘密, Gyakushū! Ma no Ike no Himitsu)
47. The Night Prior to the Attack! The Dance of Death (出撃前夜！ 死の踊り, Shutsugeki Zen'ya! Shi no Odori)
48. Baraba! Death for Treason (バラバ！裏切りに死す, Baraba! Uragiri ni Shisu)
49. The Revived Princess Ial (よみがえったイアル姫, Yomigaetta Iaru-hime)
50. Zeba! His Hair-Raising Secret Identity (ゼーバ！戦慄の正体, Zēba! Senritsu no Shōtai)
51. Great Destruction of Underground Empire Castle! (地帝城大崩壊！, Chitei Shiro Dai Hōkai!)

== Film ==
A film version of Hikari Sentai Maskman premiered on July 18, 1987, at the "Toei Manga Matsuri" film festival, where it was shown as part of a quadruple feature alongside Dragon Ball: Sleeping Princess in Devil's Castle, Saint Seiya: The Movie and the film version of Choujinki Metalder.

== Cast ==
- Takeru: Ryousuke Kaizu
- Kenta: Kouichi Kusakari
- Akira/Unas: Issei Hirota
- Haruka: Yuki Nagata
- Momoko: Kanako Maeda
- Commander Sanjuro Sugata: Hayato Tani
- Ryo Asuka: Shinji Higashi (39)
- Emperor Zeba: Hideaki Kusaka
- Prince (Princess) Igam, Princess Ial: Mina Asami
- Commander Baraba: Keijiro Shiga
- Oyubu: Yoshinori Okamoto
- Kiros: Shunta Fuchino
- Fumin: Kaori Kubota
- Hikari: Yoshiro Iwata
- Doctor Catherine: Mimi Bruce (3)
- Laraba: Machiko Soga (30)
- Shinya: Tohru Sakai (32)
- Lelai: Tomoko Ikeda (movie)
- Narrator: Hiroshi Takeda

=== Voice Actors ===
- Emperor Zeba: Seizō Katō (voice)
- Anagumas: Takuzo Kamiyama (voice)
- Okelamp: Nobu Shinoda (voice)

== Songs ==
Opening theme

- "Hikari Sentai Maskman" (光戦隊マスクマン, Hikari Sentai Masukuman)
  - Lyrics: Masao Urino (売野 雅勇, Urino Masao)
  - Composition: Daisuke Inoue (井上 大輔, Inoue Daisuke)
  - Arrangement: Ohzuchi Fujita (藤田 大土, Fujita Ōzuchi)
  - Artist: Hironobu Kageyama

Movie Opening theme

- "Shot Bomber Zenryoku Shūchū" (ショットボンバー全力集中, "Shot Bomber All Concentration Force")
  - Lyricist: Kazunori Sonobe
  - Composition: Takeshi Ike
  - Arrangement: Daito Fujita
  - Artist: Hironobu Kageyama

Ending theme

- "Ai no Soldier" (愛のソルジャー, Ai no Sorujā; "Soldier of Love")
  - Lyrics: Masao Urino
  - Composition: Daisuke Inoue
  - Arrangement: Ohzuchi Fujita
  - Artist: Hironobu Kageyama
- In both opening and ending themes in the Philippine dub of the series, it was composed and performed by singer and composer Norman Caraan.

== International broadcast and home video ==
- In its home country of Japan, the series aired in TV Asahi from February 28, 1987 to February 20, 1988, airing every Saturday at 6.00 p.m. Over two decades later, Video Maker released five DVD volumes from February 21, 2011, to June 21, 2011. This was the first home video release of the full series and each volume holds 2 discs and 10 episodes, with the fifth and final volume holding 11 episodes. Prior, Video Maker released the Hikari Sentai Maskman movie on VHS as well as on DVD as part of the "Super Sentai THE MOVIE BOX" set release on July 21, 2003, and it was later released on "Super Sentai The MOVIE VOL.3" on July 21, 2004. The movie was also given a Blu-Ray release on June 21, 2011, as part of the "Super Sentai THE MOVIE Blu-Ray BOX 1976-1995."
- In France, it was broadcast on TF1 in France on June 8, 1988, under the name Bioman 2: Maskman and marketed as a sequel to Choudenshi Bioman to capitalize on its success. AB Groupe produced and license the series' French dub with dubbing work by Studio Dovidis. This was the second series to be shown in the region as they also aired Choushinsei Flashman around the same year as Maskman.
  - In the Chinese speaking world, Both Mandarin (Taiwan dialect) and Cantonese dubs were made. But one aired first with another airing several years later.
    - In Hong Kong, this was the first Super Sentai series to be broadcast in years since J.A.K.Q. Dengekitai aired in the region back in 1981-1982 on Asia Television. For most of the 1980s, Tokusatsu programs were barely broadcast in the region, as there were reports of an accident that happened to a child who was trying to intimate Kamen Rider as casualties happened. With that said, most TV stations in the region did not dare purchase any Tokusatsu shows for a long time. The Super Sentai series as a whole disappeared alongside others as part of the purge. It was not until 1989 when they finally started to display tokusatsu programming once more, with Maskman being bought over. This series aired with a Cantonese Chinese dub on Asia Television's rival TVB Jade from September 9 of that year, until September 22, 1990, with all 51 episodes dubbed. Airing as Chāonéng Zhànshì (超能戰士 meaning Super Warriors).
    - In Taiwan, the series aired with a Taiwanese Mandarin dub on Shouhua Cartoon Station around 1997 with all 51 episodes dubbed. Airing as Guāng Zhànduì Méng Miàn Zhànshì (光戰隊蒙面戰士 meaning Light Sentai Masked Warrior), being a direct translation from the Japanese original title.
- It was aired in Thailand with a Thai dub from 1989 to 1990 on Channel 3, currently owned by TIGA Company. Video Square produced a separate dub for home video.
- In the Philippines, it aired on ABS-CBN from 1988 to 1989 and on Islands TV 13 from 1990 to 1991 under the title Laser Squadron Maskman and it gained popularity mainly for being the very first Super Sentai series with a full Tagalog dub. Just like in france it was also marketed as a direct sequel to Bioman, it was also alternatively titled as Bioman 2: Maskman. The series never finished its airing on both channels until airing on Hero which finished its full run around mid 2000.
- In Malaysia, it aired on TV3 from 1990 to 1991. This was also the first Super Sentai series to be given a full Malay dub.
- It was aired in Brazil with a Brazilian Portuguese dub debuting on April 22, 1991, under Defensores da Luz Maskman. (Maskman - Defenders of Light) on Rede Manchete and came out around the same time as two other Toei Tokusatsu shows on the same channel which was Jikuu Senshi Spielban and Kamen Rider Black. It was the fourth and final Super Sentai to air on the country (the other three that aired before were Dengeki Sentai Changeman, Choushinsei Flashman and Dai Sentai Goggle Five) before they decided to dub for Power Rangers adaptations starting with Mighty Morphin Power Rangers in 1994, due to the decline of interest of Japanese tokusatsu in the region and also due to financial and bureaucratic issues. Although there were more plans to bring more Super Sentai into Brazil as Choujyu Sentai Liveman and Kousoku Sentai Turboranger were already licensed and were set to be shown in Brazil, but went unaired followed by the decision to air Power Rangers, as it was getting very popular and Saban was weighing competition in most international markets.
- It was shown in South Korea from 1990 to 1991 with a Korean dub under Warriors of the Light: Maskman (빛의 전사 마스크맨). As of the Korean dub of Kaizoku Sentai Gokaiger, it was officially renamed Power Rangers Maskman. (파워레인저 마스크맨)
- In Indonesia, the series was first aired on RCTI in 1990 and later re-aired on SCTV from June 7, 1996 to May 23, 1997, with an Indonesian dub covering all episodes. Then it re-aired again from May 30, 1997 to March 6, 1998. But the re-run went unfinished with not all episodes shown again due to the impact of the 1997 Asian financial crisis.
