= Sins of Sister Lucia =

1978 Japanese film

- DVD cover

Japanese name
- Kanji: 修道女ルシア 辱＜けが＞す
Transcriptions
- Revised Hepburn: Shūdōjo Lucia: Kegasu
- Directed by: Kōyū Ohara
- Screenplay by: Chiho Katsura
- Starring: Yuki Nohira; Rumi Tama; Asami Ogawa; Kenji Fuji; Tamaki Katsura; Rei Okamoto
- Production company: Nikkatsu
- Distributed by: Nikkatsu
- Release date: 7 January 1978
- Running time: 70 minutes
- Country: Japan
- Language: Japanese

Sins of Sister Lucia (Japanese: 修道女ルシア 辱＜けが＞す, Hepburn: Shūdōjo Lucia: Kegasu; lit. 'Nun Lucia Humiliation'), also known as Sister Lucia's Dishonor, is a 1978 Japanese erotic film directed by Kōyū Ohara and produced and distributed by Nikkatsu as one of the studio's Roman Porno films.

== Cast ==
- Yuki Nohira as Rumiko Ōtaki / Sister Lucia
- Rumi Tama as Mother Superior
- Asami Ogawa as Sister Dorothea
- Kenji Fuji as Kenkichi Mikami
- Tamaki Katsura as Sister Helena
- Rei Okamoto as Sister Frida

== Home media ==
Sins of Sister Lucia was released on DVD in Japan by Nikkatsu on 22 June 2007, who later re-issued on DVD on 2 June 2016 in celebration of the 45th anniversary of the Roman Porno series. The film also received a Region 1 DVD release by Mondo Macabro.
