= Rope Hell =

1978 Japanese film directed by Kōyū Ohara

- Theatrical poster for Rope Hell (1978)
- Directed by: Kōyū Ohara
- Written by: Kyōhei Konno
- Produced by: Yoshiki Yūki
- Starring: Naomi Tani
- Cinematography: Hidenobu Nimura
- Edited by: Atsushi Nabeshima
- Music by: Hajime Kaburagi
- Distributed by: Nikkatsu
- Release date: June 24, 1978
- Running time: 69 min.
- Country: Japan
- Language: Japanese

Rope Hell (縄地獄, Nawa jigoku) is a 1978 Japanese film in Nikkatsu's Roman porno series, directed by Kōyū Ohara and starring Naomi Tani.

== Synopsis ==
Akiko is the heir to a yakuza clan. Hitoshi, who has been kicked out of the rival Hono Clan after attempting to seduce Akiko, kidnaps her at the behest of Hanamura. Hanamura has formed a new gang and intends to use Akiko as a hostage to take over her clan's territory. During the torture and abuse sessions which follow, Akiko comes to enjoy the treatment and forsakes her gangland empire.

== Cast ==
- Naomi Tani: Akiko
- Nami Aoki: Machiko
- Hirokazu Inoue: Saiji
- Hitoshi Takagi: Hitoshi Hanamura
- Kenji Fuji: Gorō

== Background ==
Rope Hell was based on Oniroku Dan's novel Yakuza Angel (やくざ天使, Yakuza tenshi). Like much of Oniroku Dan's works, Rope Hell uses the theme of a character who is changed through S&M sessions. At the same time that he was creating such dark torture-fests as Rope Hell, Kōyū Ohara was also directing the bright and upbeat Pink Tush Girl films, which were popular with women as well as men. Ohara had previously worked with Naomi Tani in Fascination: Portrait of a Lady (1977), and had teamed her with her on-screen tormentor in Rope Hell, Hirokazu Inoue in Fairy in a Cage (also 1977). Both of these films had also based on Dan's writings.

== Critical appraisal ==
Allmovie judges Rope Hell to be an inferior film compared to Fairy in a Cage. In their Japanese Cinema Encyclopedia: The Sex Films, the Weissers also write that Rope Hell is not up to the quality of Ohara and Tani's previous work together, but comment positively on Ohara's visuals. The Weissers judge Oniroku Dan's story to be more objectionable than some of his others, with the message that a woman will choose submission and reject self-expression if given the choice, to be clearer than in his other scripts.

== Availability ==
Rope Hell was released theatrically in Japan on June 24, 1978. It was released to home video in VHS format in Japan on February 6, 1998.

== Bibliography ==
=== English ===
- "NAWA JIGOKU". Complete Index to World Film.
- Nawa jigoku (1978) at IMDb
- Sharp, Jasper (2008). Behind the Pink Curtain: The Complete History of Japanese Sex Cinema. Guildford: FAB Press. pp. 220, 335. ISBN 978-1-903254-54-7.
- Weisser, Thomas; Yuko Mihara Weisser (1998). Japanese Cinema Encyclopedia: The Sex Films. Miami: Vital Books : Asian Cult Cinema Publications. ISBN 1-889288-52-7.

=== Japanese ===
- 団鬼六「やくざ天使」より 縄地獄(1978) (in Japanese). allcinema.net.
- 縄地獄 (in Japanese). Japanese Cinema Database (Agency for Cultural Affairs).
- 縄地獄 (in Japanese). Japanese Movie Database.
- 縄地獄(邦画) (in Japanese). Kinema Junpo.
- 団鬼六「やくざ天使」より・縄地獄 (in Japanese). www.nikkatsu-romanporno.com.
