= Office Lady Rope Slave =

- Theatrical poster for Office Lady Rope Slave (1981)
- Directed by: Katsuhiko Fujii
- Written by: Oniroku Dan (story); Norifumi Suzuki (screenplay)
- Produced by: Akihiko Yamaki
- Starring: Junko Mabuki
- Cinematography: Nobumasa Mizunoo
- Edited by: Shinji Yamada
- Music by: Hachirō Kai
- Distributed by: Nikkatsu
- Release date: January 23, 1981
- Running time: 68 min.
- Country: Japan
- Language: Japanese

Office Lady Rope Slave (団鬼六 ＯＬ縄奴隷, Dan Oniroku OL nawa dorei) aka Oniroku Dan's OL Rope Slave and sometimes mis-referenced as Oniroku Dan's Office Lady Rope Hell (団鬼六 ＯＬ縄地獄, Dan Oniroku OL nawa jigoku) is a 1981 Japanese film in Nikkatsu's Roman porno series, directed by Katsuhiko Fujii and starring Junko Mabuki.

== Synopsis ==
Two assistants to an S&M photographer decide to practise their master's art on their own. They convince a young woman to pose for them and subject her to bondage and torture during the photography session. After their work is finished, the three go to the home of the young woman's ex-boyfriend and attack him and his wife.

== Cast ==
- Junko Mabuki - Kimiyo Ezaki
- Asami Ogawa - Kikuko Okazaki
- Miki Yamaji - Yumiko Mizuhara
- Yōko Azusa - Keiko Fujikawa
- Masayoshi Nogami - Kaoru Mitamura
- Koshirō Asami - Taketsugu Sawada
- Hiroshi Shimakazu - Mikio Misaki
- Yūdai Ishiyama - Teruo Okazaki
- Tatsuya Hamaguchi - Bank manager
- Kensuke Tamai - Cleaning Shop Owner
- Setsuko Yamaguchi - Shizue
- Hiroko Uchida - Takako
- Chiharu Migiya - Office lady

== Background ==
The film marked one of the most significant performances of Junko Mabuki as Nikkatsu's second "SM Queen" (SMの女王, SM no joō). Actor Masayoshi Nogami made a career playing brutal rapists, ranging from Seduction of the Flesh (1968) to Office Lady Rope Slave. He surprised the pink film audience in 1983 by venturing into gay-themed pink films with Legend of the Big Penis: Beautiful Mystery and Mansion of Roses: Passion of Men.

== Critical appraisal ==
In their Japanese Cinema Encyclopedia: The Sex Films, the Weissers give Office Lady Rope Slave a negative review, giving it one and a half points out of four. They judge that Oniroku Dan's script shows none of the style that has made his work popular. They also fault director Fujii as being barely competent. "This is truly shabby entertainment," they conclude, "There's probably a redeeming maxim stuck somewhere in this mess, but the whole thing is too tasteless and too misogynist for anyone to care."

== Availability ==
Office Lady Rope Slave was released theatrically in Japan on January 23, 1981. It was released to home video in VHS format on December 22, 1989. It was released on DVD in Japan on December 21, 2007, as part of Geneon's tenth wave of Nikkatsu Roman porno series.

== Bibliography ==
=== English ===
- "DAN ONIROKU OL NAWA DOREI". Complete Index to World Film.
- Dan Oniroku OL nawa dorei at IMDb
- Sharp, Jasper (2008). Behind the Pink Curtain: The Complete History of Japanese Sex Cinema. Guildford: FAB Press. ISBN 978-1-903254-54-7.
- Weisser, Thomas; Yuko Mihara Weisser (1998). Japanese Cinema Encyclopedia: The Sex Films. Miami: Vital Books : Asian Cult Cinema Publications. ISBN 1-889288-52-7.

=== Japanese ===
- 団鬼六 ＯＬ縄奴隷(1981) (in Japanese). allcinema.net.
- 団鬼六 ＯＬ縄地獄 (in Japanese). Japanese Cinema Database (Agency for Cultural Affairs). Archived from the original on 2012-03-11.
- 団鬼六 ＯＬ縄地獄 (in Japanese). Japanese Movie Database.
- 団鬼六 ＯＬ縄地獄(邦画) (in Japanese). Kinema Junpo. Archived from the original on 2011-10-07.
- 団鬼六・ＯＬ縄奴隷 (in Japanese). www.nikkatsu-romanporno.com. Archived from the original on 2010-01-28.
