= Junko Mabuki =

Japanese pink film actress

- Born: Sumiko Kono; February 22, 1955 (age 71); Oita Prefecture
- Other name: Jun Sakaki
- Years active: 1979–1981

Junko Mabuki (麻吹 淳子, Mabuki Junko) is a retired pink film actress who became famous in Nikkatsu Roman Porno films, particularly in 1981.

== Career ==
Born Sumiko Kono (河野 寿美子, Kono Sumiko), she made her acting debut by 1979, in Aftermath of Battles Without Honor and Humanity (Eiichi Kudo), with the alias Jun Sakaki (榊淳 名, Sakaki Jun). The same year, Kono came under exclusive Nikkatsu contract with the stage name "Junko Mabuki". S&M author Oniroku Dan also approved of Mabuki and scripted her first lead role in White Uniform in Rope Hell (1980) especially for her. Following Naomi Tani's sudden retirement in 1979, Mabuki was promoted by Nikkatsu as their new "SM Queen" (SMの女王, SM no joō). Although Oniroku Dan was appreciative of her energy both onscreen and in actual sex life with her, Mabuki was not able to endure the physical strain that the S&M roles required, and she retired from acting after only two years.

== Season of Infidelity ==
Four of Oniroku Dan’s stories, originally published in Japanese in 1997, were published in English in 2010 by Vertical, Inc. The collection of these stories is titled Season of Infidelity; the collection’s last story, Bewitching Bloom, is a telling of Dan’s relationship with Naomi Tani, and also includes notes about three subsequent Nikkatsu "Queens"; Mabuki, Izumi Shima, and Miki Takakura.

== Nikkatsu filmography ==
- Onsen Pleasures (快楽昇天風呂), Atsushi Fujiura (1979)
- Showa Erotica: Noble Lady of Roses (昭和エロチカ 薔薇の貴婦人), Katsuhiko Fujii (1980)
- Nympho Diver: Tingling (若後家海女 うずく), Atsushi Fujiura (1980)
- White Uniform in Rope Hell (団鬼六 白衣縄地獄), Shōgorō Nishimura (1980)
- Blazing Bondage Lady (団鬼六 縄炎夫人) a.k.a. Madam Rope Flame, Katsuhiko Fujii (1980)
- Hell of Roses (団鬼六 薔薇地獄), Shōgorō Nishimura (1980)
- Office Lady Rope Slave (団鬼六 OL縄奴隷) a.k.a. Oniroku Dan's OL Rope Slave, Katsuhiko Fujii (1981)
- Secretary Rope Discipline (団鬼六 女秘書縄調教), Hidehiro Ito (1981)
- Zoom Up: Woman From the Dirty Magazine (ズームアップ ビニール本の女), Katsuhiko Fujii (1981)
- Lustful Life: "Nights Make Me Wet!" (愛欲生活 夜よ、濡らして), Shōgorō Nishimura (1981)
- Lecherous Flower Train (好色花でんしゃ), Mamoru Watanabe (1981)
- Female Teacher in Rope Hell (団鬼六 女教師縄地獄), Shōgorō Nishimura (1981)
- Female Beautician Rope Discipline (団鬼六 女美容師縄飼育), Hidehiro Ito (1981)
