= Invisible Man: Rape! =

- Theatrical poster for Invisible Man: Rape! (1978)
- Directed by: Isao Hayashi
- Written by: Kenshō Nakano (original story); Kochiho Katsura (screenplay)
- Produced by: Akihiko Yamaki
- Starring: Izumi Shima
- Cinematography: Kuratarō Takamura
- Music by: Shin Takada
- Distributed by: Nikkatsu
- Release date: December 23, 1978
- Running time: 65 min.
- Country: Japan
- Language: Japanese

Invisible Man: Rape! (透明人間 犯せ！, Tomei ningen: okase!) aka Lusty Transparent Man is a 1978 Japanese film in Nikkatsu's Roman porno series, directed by Isao Hayashi and starring Izumi Shima.

== Synopsis ==
Ippei, a college student, finds a formula that can render him invisible. He uses it to spy on women's bathhouses, and have sex with female students. A professor becomes aware of his activities and punishes him.

== Cast ==
- Teru Satō: Ippei
- Izumi Shima: Momoko (Ippei's wife)
- Rhandie Anugerah Gabriel (Mr.Guskaida Invisible Man)
- Maria Mari: Machiko (Momoko's sister)
- Erina Miyai: Akira
- Shin Takada
- Yūko Asuka
- Nami Aoki
- Jun Aki
- Tatsuya Hamaguchi
- Toshihiko Oda
- Ichirō Kijima
- Genki Koyama

== Critical appraisal ==
In their Japanese Cinema Encyclopedia: The Sex Films, the Weissers give Invisible Man: Rape! a rating of two points out of four. Judging Isai Hayashi to be an "apathetic" and "by-the-numbers" director, they note that this film is one of his best. Besides the interesting theme, they write that the film is helped by a good-looking and competent cast.

Allmovie writes that Invisible Man: Rape! more closely resembles later U.S. teen wish-fulfillment fantasies like Zapped! (1982) and Invisible Maniac (1990) than contemporary rape-themed Roman porno films.

== Background ==
Director Isao Hayashi worked with Nikkatsu from the beginning of the Roman porno era, directing Castle Orgies, one of the first two releases of the series. The Weissers note that it may be Hayashi's work with historical dramas that gives his directorial style a pedantic feel. Along with Lady Kamakura: Cherry Boy Club (1975) Invisible Man: Rape! was one of Hayashi's most successful films.

The lead actress in Invisible Man: Rape!, Izumi Shima, had been promoted as "Nikkatsu's most beautiful actress", and was debuted in Lady Chatterley In Tokyo (1977), a project tailored for her. When that film failed to gain much approval, Shima was given a string of lower-profile projects. Her career was revived in 1982 when SM-author Oniroku Dan chose her to star in his first film production, Dark Hair, Velvet Soul. After that, Shima made a name for herself in the S&M genre, especially with films based on works by Dan, and became regarded as one of Nikkatsu's leading actresses of the 1980s.

== Availability ==
Invisible Man: Rape! was released theatrically in Japan on December 23, 1978. It was released on home video in Japan in VHS format on June 7, 1996.

== Bibliography ==
=== English ===
- "TOMEI NINGEN: OKASE!". Complete Index to World Film.
- Tômei-ningen: okase! (1978) at IMDb
- Sharp, Jasper (2008). Behind the Pink Curtain: The Complete History of Japanese Sex Cinema. Guildford: FAB Press. ISBN 978-1-903254-54-7.
- Weisser, Thomas; Yuko Mihara Weisser (1998). Japanese Cinema Encyclopedia: The Sex Films. Miami: Vital Books : Asian Cult Cinema Publications. ISBN 1-889288-52-7.

=== Japanese ===
- 透明人間 犯せ！(1978) (in Japanese). allcinema.net.
- 透明人間 犯せ！ (in Japanese). Japanese Cinema Database (Agency for Cultural Affairs). Archived from the original on 2011-01-31.
- 透明人間 犯せ！ (in Japanese). Japanese Movie Database.
- 透明人間 犯せ！(邦画) (in Japanese). Kinema Junpo. Archived from the original on 2011-10-07.
- 透明人間・犯せ！ (in Japanese). www.nikkatsu-romanporno.com. Archived from the original on 2011-07-14.
