= Kate Asabuki =

Japanese actress and glamour model

- 朝吹 ケイト
- Born: 3 July 1962 (age 63); Tokyo, Japan
- Height: 1.60 m (5 ft 3 in)

Kate Asabuki (Japanese: 朝吹 ケイト, Hepburn: Asabuki Keito; born July 3, 1962) is a Japanese actress and glamour model who appeared in Nikkatsu's Roman Porno films of the 1980s and was also an early adult video (AV) performer.

== Life and career ==
Asabuki studied French and English in college, and joined Nikkatsu to work in their Roman Porno films in 1982, while still attending university. She took her stage name "Kate" from Kate Bush, who was her favorite singer. One of her earliest Nikkatsu appearances was in the seventh entry of the Female Teacher (Onna Kyoshi) series (1977–83), director Nobuhiko Saito's Assaulted The Female Teacher (1983).

At Nikkatsu, Asabuki appeared in several films directed by Atsushi Fujiura. She appeared in Fujiura's Lady's Triangle (Ojosan No Matagura, 1983). Fujiura also directed one of Asabuki's most successful films, Koichiro Uno's Dancer of Izu (Uno Koichiro No Izu No Odoriko, 1984). Nikkatsu's Koichiro Uno series consisted of humorous sex stories featuring strong female leads. The series was conceived as Roman Pornos designed to appeal to women, and films that couples could enjoy together. This entry, called the best in the series, was a parody of Yasunari Kawabata's famous story, The Dancing Girl of Izu. In Uno's version, Kawabata's titular classical dancer was instead a stripper.

Other prominent pinku eiga directors for whom Asabuki acted were Shōgorō Nishimura in Woman with the Pierced Nipples (Chikubi Ni Pierce O Shita Onna) (1983), and Masaru Konuma in Stewardess Scandal: Hold Me Like an Animal (Stewardess Scandal: Kemono No Youni Dakishimete) (1984). When asked to comment on Asabuki, Konuma said, "A nice girl. Very responsive. One of the only actresses who could speak multiple languages. I had her talk English in one of the sex scenes. I liked the way it sounded."

In 1983 Asabuki also appeared in some early videos released by Nikkatsu. One of them, Blue Experience Part 1, become a highly ranked AV collector's item by 2005, with an estimated price of almost 60,000 yen (about $600). A year later, in May 1984, Asabuki starred in one of the earliest adult videos produced by Japan Home Video, Happy Onanie, which was released under their Penguin label, the precursor to the Alice Japan brand.

In the late 1990s Asabuki was an anchor on the weekly TV program Tokyo Rock TV. She continued her studies in England, and hoped to work as an actress in the United States, a country she had visited four times by 1989. In 1999 she made a fifth trip to the U.S. to model for photographer Ron Vogel for several American magazines, including Penthouse and Hustler.

Back in Japan, she starred in the June 2001 pink film Uma o kau hitozuma.

== See also ==
- List of Nikkatsu Roman Porno films

== Sources ==
- Asabuki, Kate. (1999). "Hollywood or Bust - Memoirs of America" in Asian Cult Cinema #25, 4th Quarter, 1999. p. 58-62.
- "朝吹ケイト (Asabuki Keito)". JMDB (in Japanese).
- "朝吹ケイト - Asabuki Keito". Web I-dic (in Japanese). Archived from the original on 2015-01-23.
- Kate Asabuki at IMDb
- "Kate Asabuki - A pictorial", Asian Cult Cinema #22, p. 32-33
- "KATE ASABUKI". Complete Index to World Film.
- Konuma, Masaru. (1998). Interviewed by Thomas and Yuko Mihara Weisser on November 6, 1998, in Asian Cult Cinema, #22, 1st Quarter, 1999. p. 19-28.
- Saotome, Hiromi (2006-03-10). "朝吹ケイト ("Kate Asabuki"". ロマンポルノ女優 (Roman Porno Actresses) (in Japanese). Tokyo: Kawade Shobo Shinsha, Publishers. pp. 152–158. ISBN 4-309-48156-6.
- Weisser, Thomas; Yuko Mihara Weisser (1998). Japanese Cinema Encyclopedia: The Sex Films. Miami: Vital Books : Asian Cult Cinema Publications. ISBN 1-889288-52-7.
