= The Globe Tokyo =

Shakespearean theatre in Japan

Coordinates: 35.704822°N 139.700357°E

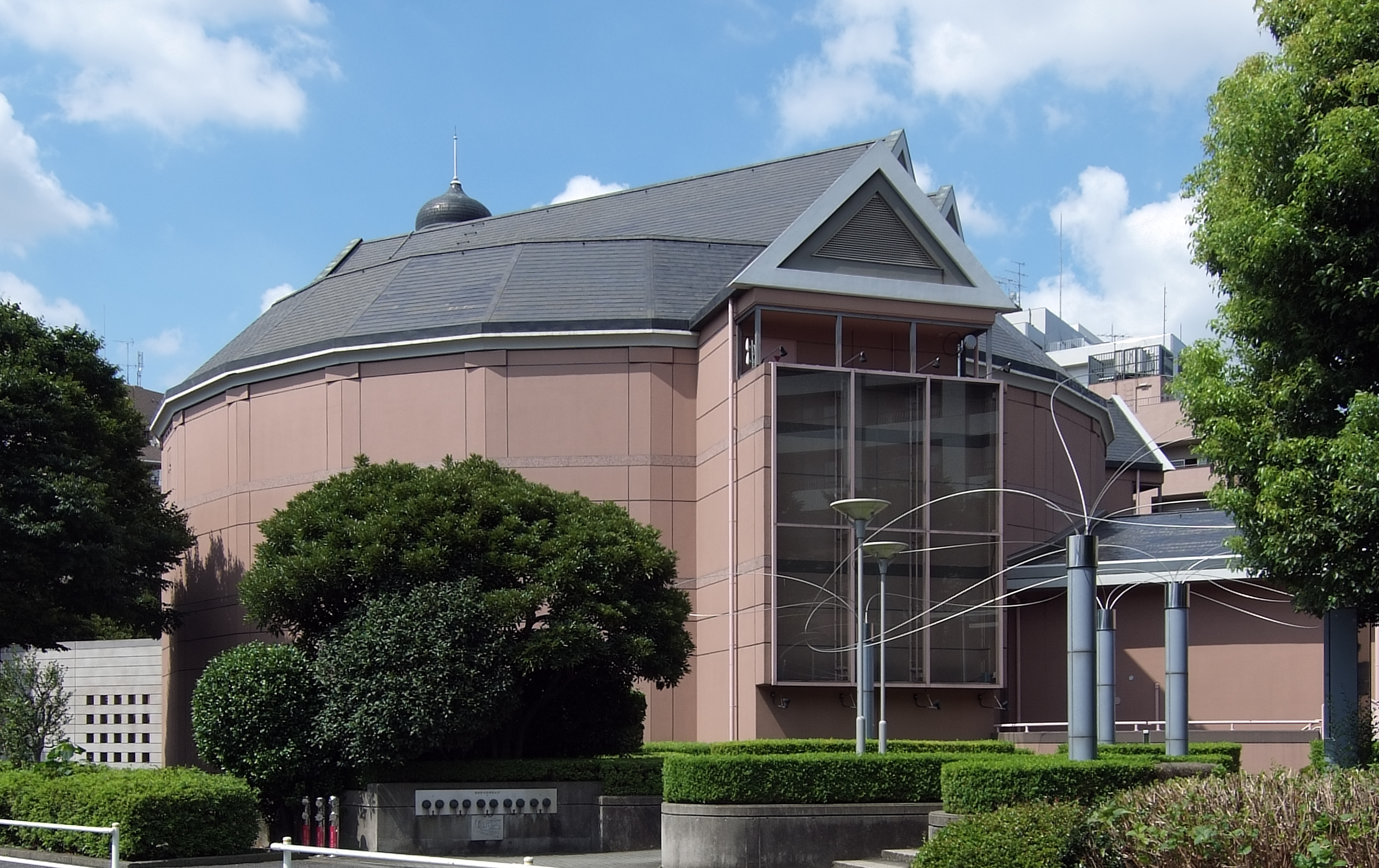
An image of Panasonic Globe Theatre

The Globe Tokyo, is a theater located in Hyakunincho, Shinjuku, Tokyo, Japan. Was designed by Isozaki Arata and opened in 1988 to showcase local and international productions of Shakespeare's plays. Guest companies and artists have included the British Royal National Theatre, Royal Shakespeare Company, Shakespeare's Globe Theatre, Ingmar Bergman, Peter Brook, Barry Kyle and Robert Lepage, as well as such Kabuki stars as Bando Tamasaburo (Lady Macbeth), and Ichikawa Somegoro (Kabuki Hamlet).

Matsushita Electric Industrial (now Panasonic) sponsored the theater from its opening until 2002, and the venue was known for a time as the "Panasonic Globe Theatre."

Since its opening, The Globe Tokyo had been known for productions related to Shakespeare. However, because it was unable to eliminate its accumulated deficits, the theater closed temporarily at the end of July 2002.

In October of that year, the former Johnny & Associates group acquired the theater. Since then, the theater has primarily hosted musicals starring actors and entertainers affiliated with the former Johnny & Associates agency, as well as other theatrical productions, musicals, and concerts.
