= Pink Tush Girl =

- Theatrical poster
- Directed by: Kōyū Ohara
- Written by: Narito Kaneko (screenplay); Osamu Hashimoto (novel)
- Starring: Kaori Takeda; Ako; Yūko Katagiri
- Cinematography: Masaru Mori
- Edited by: Atsushi Nabeshima
- Music by: Daikō Nagato
- Distributed by: Nikkatsu
- Release date: April 29, 1978
- Running time: 87 minutes
- Country: Japan
- Language: Japanese

Pink Tush Girl aka Pink Hip Girl (桃尻娘 ピンク・ヒップ・ガール, Momojiri musume: Pinku hippu gaaru) is a 1978 Japanese film in Nikkatsu's Roman porno series, directed by Kōyū Ohara and starring Kaori Takeda, Ako and Yūko Katagiri. It is based on an award-winning novel by Osamu Hashimoto.

== Synopsis ==
An extroverted high school girl befriends an introverted female classmate, and the two begin exploring their curiosity about sex together. They begin working as prostitutes, but their friendship is tested when they both fall in love with the same man. The film ends on an upbeat note with the two girls reconciling their friendship.

== Cast ==
- Kahori Takeda (竹田かほり) as Rena Sakakibara
- Ako (亜湖) as Yuko Taguchi
- Atsushi Takahashi (高橋淳) as Gen'ichi Kikawada
- Yūji Nogami (野上祐二) as Takinoue
- Akio Kuwasaki (桑崎晃男) as Yamashina
- Asami Morikawa (森川麻美) as Ryōko Matsuzaki
- Kunio Shimizu (清水国雄) as Tōru Kinoshita
- Risato Sasaki (佐々木梨里)
- Yūko Katagiri as Tokie Yamada
- Yûya Uchida (内田裕也) as Sen'ichi Yamada
- Ushi Tōyama (遠山牛) as Ken Ishida
- Satoko Ōtake (大竹智子) as High school girl
- Nobue Ichitani (一谷伸江) as Nobue Sakakibara
- Etsuko Seki (関悦子) as Hiroko Taguchi
- Shirô Kishibe (岸部シロー) as Mastumoto
- Osamu Hashimoto (橋本治) as Shop owner

== Critical appraisal ==
In their Japanese Cinema Encyclopedia: The Sex Films, the Weissers note that with the Pink Tush Girl trilogy, Kōyū Ohara reversed the style of his earlier dark films such as the True Story of a Woman in Prison trilogy (1975-1977). In the Pink Tush Girl films Ohara depicts, "an erotic world from pop music and high school tribulations". Unlike most films in the Roman Porno series, the films were popular with both men and women. The Weissers attribute this partly to the on-screen relationship between the two lead performers, Kahori Takeda and Ako.

The director noted that this upbeat, breezy take on the sex lives of two female characters was at odds with the way that women were depicted in the pink film at the time. Ohara was enthusiastic about this aspect of the project, and because of this, caused the film to go over-budget. He remembered, "I was scolded severely by the Nikkatsu management", but he felt vindicated when the film's popularity caused the studio to ask him to make sequels.

In his survey of the films of Kōyū Ohara, Graham Lewis writes that though Pink Hip Girl is less serious in tone than Ohara's earlier films, it is no less well-made and thoroughly enjoyable. He notes that Ohara's nickname, "King of Pink-Pop" derives largely from his work in this film and its sequels. Lewis concludes: "If Ohara's other films sound too rough for you, this might be your cup of tea".

Jasper Sharp judges Pink Tush Girl to be arguably Ohara's best film. He writes that the film's road movie structure, catchy theme song, and longer running length make it a more fully rounded cinematic experience than many contemporary Nikkatsu Roman Pornos. He speculates that, because of the wider popularity of this film, Nikkatsu would have been wise to pursue the lighter tone of this film rather than the dark S&M films that they concentrated on producing at the time.

== Availability ==
Pink Tush Girl was released theatrically in Japan on April 29, 1978. It was released on DVD in Japan on DVD December 22, 2005, as part of Geneon's second wave of Nikkatsu Roman porno series.
