= Lady Chatterley In Tokyo =

- Theatrical poster for Lady Chatterley In Tokyo (1977)
- Directed by: Katsuhiko Fujii
- Written by: Masayasu Ōebara
- Produced by: Akihiko Yamaki
- Starring: Izumi Shima
- Cinematography: Kenji Hagawara
- Edited by: Shinji Yamada
- Music by: Shin Takada
- Distributed by: Nikkatsu
- Release date: August 20, 1977
- Running time: 90 minutes
- Country: Japan
- Language: Japanese

Lady Chatterley In Tokyo (東京チャタレー夫人, Tōkyō Chatterly fujin) is a 1977 Japanese film in Nikkatsu's Roman porno series, directed by Katsuhiko Fujii and starring Izumi Shima.

== Synopsis ==
Mio is a young woman whose husband is a millionaire's son. When he becomes impotent following an automobile accident, she begins an affair with their gardener and chauffeur, Nitta. After her husband discovers Mio's infidelity, he forces her to leave.

== Cast ==
- Izumi Shima
- Hiromi Maie
- Kenji Shiiya
- Yōko Azusa
- Teruho Matsunaga
- Naomi Oka

== Critical appraisal ==
In their Japanese Cinema Encyclopedia: The Sex Films, the Weissers give Lady Chatterly in Tokyo a rating of two out of four. They contend that by changing the lead female character from the loyal wife with unsatisfied sexual needs, in Lawrence's original 1928 novel Lady Chatterley's Lover, Lady Chatterly in Tokyo removes the social and psychological conflict in the novel. "...all human interest", they write", "is missing from director Fujii's banal version. Instead, he merely offers a superficial adulterous story with little or no relationship to Lawrence's characters."

The film was not popular with the usual pink film and Roman Porno audience. It was advertised as a "love story", and proved surprisingly popular with female audiences, not the usual target for the Roman Porno series.

== Availability ==
Lady Chatterley In Tokyo was released theatrically in Japan on August 20, 1977. It was released on VHS in Japan on May 25, 1989, and re-released in April 1995.

== Bibliography ==
=== English ===
- "Lady Chatterley in Tokyo". Adam Film World October 1978, pp. 60–63.
- "TOKYO CHATTERLY FUJIN". Complete Index to World Film.
- Tokyo Chatterly fujin (1979) at IMDb
- Sharp, Jasper (2008). Behind the Pink Curtain: The Complete History of Japanese Sex Cinema. Guildford: FAB Press. pp. 127, 342. ISBN 978-1-903254-54-7.
- Weisser, Thomas; Yuko Mihara Weisser (1998). Japanese Cinema Encyclopedia: The Sex Films. Miami: Vital Books : Asian Cult Cinema Publications. ISBN 1-889288-52-7.

=== Japanese ===
- 東京チャタレー夫人(1977) (in Japanese). allcinema.net.
- 東京チャタレー夫人 (in Japanese). Japanese Cinema Database (Agency for Cultural Affairs).
- 東京チャタレー夫人 (in Japanese). Japanese Movie Database.
- 東京チャタレー夫人(邦画) (in Japanese). Kinema Junpo.
