= Lady Black Rose =

- Theatrical poster for Lady Black Rose (1978)
- Directed by: Shōgorō Nishimura
- Written by: Oniroku Dan (story); Chiho Katsurako (screenplay)
- Produced by: Yoshiki Yūki
- Starring: Naomi Tani; Haruka Tajima; Keijiro Shiga
- Cinematography: Yonezō Maeda
- Edited by: Toyoharu Nishimura
- Distributed by: Nikkatsu
- Release date: April 1, 1978
- Running time: 72 minutes
- Country: Japan
- Language: Japanese

Lady Black Rose (黒薔薇夫人, Kurobara fujin), also known as Madame Black Rose, is a 1978 Japanese film in Nikkatsu's Roman Porno series, directed by Shōgorō Nishimura and starring Naomi Tani.

== Synopsis ==
Saori is the wealthy, unfaithful wife of the impotent Kosaku. When she returns from a trip abroad, Tsumura, Kosaku's assistant, meets her and takes Saori to an apartment. There Tsumura rapes her and submits her to various sexual tortures while she is photographed by photo-journalist Tayama. Her husband, Kosaku uses the photographs to blackmail Saori into giving him control of the family estate. Saori is returned to her mansion, but kept in a cage in the basement where she is subjected to regular bouts of abuse from Tsumura. Besides rape, other indignities endured by Lady Saori include breast bondage, enemas and the insertion of hen's eggs into her vagina. After Kosaku dies from a stroke, Saori realizes that she has come to enjoy Tsumura's treatment.

== Cast ==
- Naomi Tani: Saori Nanbara
- Haruka Tajima: Aiko Sagara
- Keijirō Shiga: Hideo Tsumura
- Mami Yūki: Mitsuko Tsumura
- Tesshō Furukawa (Tetsuaki Furukawa): Hiroyuki Tayama

== Critical appraisal ==
Director Shōgorō Nishimura's first film in the S&M genre, Lady Black Rose was more successful than other works by the director at the time. In their Japanese Cinema Encyclopedia: The Sex Films, the Weissers write that two scenes in this film are often used as examples of the S&M genre in Nikkatsu's Roman Porno series. In one scene, brandy is poured into Tani's vagina while her skin can be seen changing from pale to red. In a 1998 interview, Tani recalled the other scene: "People still talk about the "stomach expanding" scene in Lady Black Rose. The sadist forces me to drink gallons of water through a funnel. You can see my belly growing larger and larger. But, there was no mystery or SFX trick. I was simply good at sucking my belly into a small ball and then expanding it with a large exhale." Due to scenes like this, Lady Black Rose has been called "the ultimate woman-as-an-object" film.

Though the film was successful, according to the Weissers there is an unevenness between the film's story and its realization. They have high praise for director Nishimura and "the exquisite look of the production," while Oniroku Dan's story is called "rudimentary... mean-spirited mayhem." They conclude, "[Nishimura]'s visuals are, in a word, breath-taking. Perhaps there is no other SM film in Nikkatsu's library which so lovingly depicts the art of torture." After the success of Lady Black Rose, Nishimura and Tani teamed up again for the more radical Rope Cosmetology (also 1978).

== Availability ==
Lady Black Rose was released theatrically in Japan on April 1, 1978. It was released on VHS in Japan on August 16, 1983, and re-released on March 10, 1995. Oniroku Dan's novel was remade as a V-cinema released on October 15, 1999.

== Bibliography ==
=== English ===
- Fentone, Steve (1998). "A Rip of the Flesh: The Japanese 'Pink Film' Cycle". She. 2 (11): 4.
- "KUROBARA FUJIN". Complete Index to World Film.
- Kurobara fujin (1978) at IMDb
- Weisser, Thomas; Yuko Mihara Weisser (1998). Japanese Cinema Encyclopedia: The Sex Films. Miami: Vital Books : Asian Cult Cinema Publications. ISBN 1-889288-52-7.

=== Japanese ===
- 団鬼六 黒薔薇夫人(1978) (in Japanese). allcinema.net.
- 黒薔薇夫人 (in Japanese). Japanese Cinema Database (Agency for Cultural Affairs).
- 黒薔薇夫人 (in Japanese). Japanese Movie Database.
- 黒薔薇夫人(邦画) (in Japanese). Kinema Junpo.
- 団鬼六・黒薔薇夫人 (in Japanese). www.nikkatsu-romanporno.com.
