= Kōyū Ohara =

Japanese film director

Koyu Ohara
- Born: Japan
- Died: February 20, 2004
- Occupations: Film director and screenwriter
- Years active: 1972–1988

Kōyū Ohara (小原 宏裕, Ohara Kōyū) was a Japanese film director known for his popular Roman Porno films, Fairy in a Cage (1977) and the Pink Tush Girl series (1978–1980). One of Nikkatsu's most versatile and prolific directors, filming eight movies in 1979 alone, his stylistic preoccupations led him to be known as "King of Pop Art Porn."

== Life and career ==
=== Early life ===
Kōyū Ohara attributes his interest in film to the fact that his grandfather had worked at Nikkatsu as a director. As a child, he claims to have seen up to 200 movies a year. Though he studied law at Keio University and worked as a secretary to a member of the House of Representatives, rather than take the bar exam, he took an entrance exam at Shochiku studios. He failed the Shochiku exam, but tried out for Nikkatsu, and began working there as an assistant director in 1961. He was assigned to director Koreyoshi Kurahara, under whom he worked with future Roman Porno master, Tatsumi Kumashiro.

=== Roman porno ===
When Nikkatsu made its decision to concentrate almost exclusively on its Roman porno version of the soft-core pink film genre, Ohara was not enthusiastic about the change. Many of Nikkatsu's other directors and actors left the studio at this time rather than work in sex films, but Ohara stayed with the studio, hoping for a chance to direct. He worked as chief assistant director to Shōgorō Nishimura on the first Roman porno, Apartment Wife: Afternoon Affair (1971), and made his directorial debut the following year with the successful period film, Passion: Ohichi's Love Song (1972). After a major success with 1973's College Girl: Sex Equation, Ohara became one of Nikkatsu's busiest directors. He worked exclusively for Nikkatsu until the mid-1980s, directing 42 films for the studio, four of which were among Nikkatsu's top ten money-makers of all time.

Summarizing his style, the Weissers say, "Director Ohara is one of Nikkatsu's most underrated filmmakers, finally recognized in the late '90s for his forays into pop art... He was easily the studio's hippest director, interminably mixing contemporary music and fashionable events-of-the-day within the traditional pinku eiga format."

Ohara became known for his ability to direct successful pink movies in a variety of genres. He had successes in the S&M genre with Fairy in a Cage (1977) and Wet Rope Confession. After Nikkatsu had stopped producing "violent pink" films following Yasuharu Hasebe's ''Rape! 13th Hour (1976), Ohara revived the genre with Zoom Up: Rape Site (1979). Ohara directed women-in-prison films with the True Story of a Woman in Jail series, and the pink Catholic nun films Sins of Sister Lucia (1978) and Wet Rope Confession: Convent Story (1979). On television, he directed children's shows including Three Sisters Shushutorian. He directed successful satirical films like Love Daydream (1980), and office lady sex comedies like I Like It From Behind (1981), and even a pink science-fiction film, Lady Momoko's Adventure (1979) and the musical comedy pink film Oh! Takarazuka (1982). Critic Jasper Sharp considers Ohara's "finest work" to be the 1978 coming-of-age story Pink Tush Girl which gave rise to two sequels, Pink Tush Girl: Love Attack and Pink Tush Girl: Proposal Strategy.

He worked with Nikkatsu's top actresses, including Naomi Tani in Fairy in a Cage, Rope Hell (1978) and Fascination: Portrait of a Lady (1977), all of which were based on scripts by Oniroku Dan. After directing some darker films, in 1978 Ohara started his light-hearted Pink Tush Girl trilogy. Centered around high-school life and popular music, these films were popular with both male and female audiences.

=== After Roman porno ===
In 1982 Ohara went to Hong Kong where he directed films for Golden Harvest, including the popular China Scandal: Exotic Dance, a co-production with Nikkatsu. He left Nikkatsu in 1984 to concentrate on his interest in popular music. He directed music videos for teen-oriented singers with the Warner/Pioneer label among other Japanese record companies.

Ohara retired from full-time film work in 1988. In 1999, while walking home from a drinking bout, Ohara had a stroke and injured himself in a fall, causing a slow down in his lifestyle and filmmaking. Ohara died on February 20, 2004.

== Partial filmography ==
- Fairy in a Cage a.k.a. Woman in a Cage (檻の中の妖精 - Ori no naka no yosei) (June 4, 1977)
- Fascination: Portrait of a Lady (幻想夫人絵図 - Genso fujin ezu) (October 1, 1977)
- Sins of Sister Lucia (修道女ルシア 辱＜けが＞す - Shūdōjo Lucia: Kegasu) (January 1, 1978)
- Pink Tush Girl (桃尻娘 ピンク・ヒップ・ガール - Momojiri musume: Pinku hippu gaaru) (April 29, 1978)
- Rope Hell (縄地獄 - Nawa jigoku) (June 24, 1978)
- Pink Tush Girl: Love Attack (桃尻娘 ラブアタック - Momojiri musume: rabu atakku) (April 28, 1979)
- Zoom Up: Rape Site (ズームアップ 暴行現場 - Zoom Up: boko genba) (September 8, 1979)

== Bibliography ==
- Lewis, Graham "The Films of Koyu Ohara" in Asian Cult Cinema, #27 (2nd quarter 2000), p. 24-29.
- "KOYU OHARA". Complete Index to World Film.
- Ohara, Koyū. Interviewed by Maki Hamamoto. (2000). "Koyu Ohara Speaks Out!" Asian Cult Cinema, #27 (2nd quarter, 2000), pp. 30–38.
- "小原宏裕 (Ohara Koyū)" (in Japanese). Japanese Movie Database.
- Weisser, Thomas; Yuko Mihara Weisser (1998). Japanese Cinema Encyclopedia: The Sex Films. Miami: Vital Books : Asian Cult Cinema Publications. ISBN 1-889288-52-7.
