= Izumi Shima =

Japanese mainstream film actress (born 1953)

- Born: Keiko Ishida; December 3, 1953 (age 72); Tokyo, Japan
- Other names: Keiko Ono; Emi Shirakawa; Nozomi Shirakawa
- Occupation: Actress

Izumi Shima (志麻 いづみ, Shima Izumi) is a Japanese mainstream film actress who is best known for her roles in Nikkatsu's Roman Porno film series.

== Life and career ==
Shima was born Keiko Ishida (石田恵子) in the Shinjuku district of Tokyo, Japan on December 3, 1953. Ishida made her acting debut by 1975, using the alias Keiko Ono (小野恵子), in the TV series Taiyō ni Hoero!, but this alias was soon changed to avoid confusion with another actress. Ishida also used the aliases Emi Shirakawa (白川恵美) and Nozomi Shirakawa (白川望美) during this period.

In 1977, Ishida came under exclusive contract with Nikkatsu studio and was given the stage name "Izumi Shima". She made her debut with the studio in the August 1977 Roman Porno film Lady Chatterley In Tokyo. Nikkatsu promoted Shima for this film as their "most beautiful actress" and the cinematography in the film was designed specifically to highlight her attractiveness. However, due to the disappointing reception of Lady Chatterley In Tokyo, Shima was relegated to low profile and supporting roles for years. According to noted SM-author Oniroku Dan, who was also her sexual partner, she failed to overcome her timid and restrained mood for roles that required physical intimacy, which contrasted sharply with her passionate off-screen sex life.

During this time, Shima appeared in a number of S&M works including the 1980 Blazing Bondage Lady and the 1982 Female Beautician Rope Discipline both written by Oniroku Dan. When Oniroku Dan, seemingly unhappy with the fate of his scripts, decided to produce his own film, Dark Hair, Velvet Soul in 1982, he brought in respected pink film director Mamoru Watanabe to direct the film and he also chose Shima for the starring role. According to the Weissers, Shima brought "elegance and panache" to her role and after this successful appearance, she made S&M films her specialty and became regarded as one of Nikkatsu's leading S&M actresses of the 1980s. Nikkatsu's "SM Queen" (SMの女王, SM no joō) in the period 1982 - 1983, Shima was usually cast as the staple dominatrix type in her later films.

== Season of Infidelity ==
Four of Oniroku Dan’s stories, originally published in Japanese in 1997, were published in English in 2010 by Vertical, Inc. The collection of these stories is titled Season of Infidelity; the collection’s last story, Bewitching Bloom, is a telling of Dan’s relationship with Naomi Tani, and also includes notes about three subsequent Nikkatsu "Queens"; Shima, Junko Mabuki, and Miki Takakura.

== Nikkatsu filmography ==
- Lady Chatterley In Tokyo (東京チャタレー夫人, Tokyo Chatterly Fujin) (Nikkatsu, Aug. 1977)
- Gate of Flesh (肉体の門, Nikutai no mon) (Dec. 1977)
- Tenement Apartment: Obscene Affair (四畳半・猥褻な情事, Yo-jo-han: Wasenna Joji) (Jan. 1978)
- Teacher Deer (教師 女鹿, Kyoshi Mejika) (Mar. 1978)
- Apartment Wife: Night By Ourselves (団地妻 二人だけの夜 -, Danchizuma Futari Dake No Yoru) (Apr. 1978)
- Wakazuma ga nureru toki (若妻が濡れるとき) (Jun. 1978)
- Hito natsu no kankei (ひと夏の関係) (Aug. 1978)
- Izumi daihachi no okashikko (泉大八の犯しっこ) (Oct. 1978)
- Invisible Man: Rape! (透明人間 犯せ！, Tomei Ningen: Okase!) (Dec. 1978)
- Shiroi fukurami (白いふくらみ) (Feb. 1979)
- Flesh Target: Rape! (肉の標的 奪う！！, Niku No Hyoteki: Ubau) (Mar. 1979)
- Three Juicy Sisters: Casual Sex (色情三姉妹 ひざくずし, Shikijo Sanshimai: Hizakuzushi) (Jun. 1979)
- Bridal Doll (団鬼六 花嫁人形, Dan Oniroku Hanayome Ningyo) (Oct. 1979)
- Tokyo Eros: 1001 Nights (東京エロス千夜一夜, Tokyo Eros Senya Ichiya) (Oct. 1979)
- Koichiro Uno's Wet and Purring (宇能鴻一郎の濡れて悶える, Uno Koichiro No Nurete Modaeru) (Jan. 1980)
- Haitoku fujin no yokujō (背徳夫人の欲望) (Feb. 1980)
- Uptown Lady: Days of Eros (山の手夫人 性愛の日々, Yamanote Fujin: Seiai No Hibi) (May 1980)
- Secret of Newlywed Wife (単身赴任 新妻の秘密, Tanshin Funin: Niizuma no Himitsu) (Jul. 1980)
- Blazing Bondage Lady aka Madam Rope Flame (団鬼六 縄炎夫人, Dan Oniroku Joen Fujin) (Sep. 1980)
- Sekkusu Dokku: Midarana Chiryō (セックスドック 淫らな治療) (Dec. 1980)
- Woman Who Exposes Herself (見せたがる女, Misetagaru onna) (Jan. 1981)
- "Love Me Strong... Love Me Hard" (もっと激しくもっとつよく, Motto hageshiku motto tsuyoku) (May 1981)
- Widow's Bedroom (未亡人の寝室, Mibojin no shinshitsu) (Jun. 1981)
- Female Beautician Rope Discipline (団鬼六 女美容師縄飼育, Dan Oniroku onna biyoshi nawa shiiku) (Nov. 1981)
- Dark Hair Velvet Soul (団鬼六 黒髪縄夫人, Dan Oniroku kurokami nawa fujin) (Oni Pro / Nikkatsu, Mar. 1982)
- Indecent Family: Mother & Daughter (ワイセツ家族 母と娘, Waisetsu kazoku: haha to musume) (May 1982)
- Blue Woman (団鬼六 蒼いおんな, Dan Oniroku aoi onna) (Aug. 1982)
- Rope and Breasts (縄と乳房, Nawa to chibusa) (Jan. 1983)
- Snake Hole (団鬼六 蛇の穴, Dan Oniroku hebi no ana) (Oni Pro / Nikkatsu, Feb. 1983)
- Beautiful Teacher in Torture Hell (団鬼六 美教師地獄責め, Dan Oniroku: bikyōshi jigoku seme) (Dec. 1985)
- Snake and Whip (団鬼六 蛇と鞭, Dan Oniroku hebi to muchi) (Aug. 1986)
- Angel To Be Sacrificed (いけにえ天使, Ikenie tenshi) (Jan. 1988)
