= Fascination: Portrait of a Lady =

- Theatrical poster for Fascination: Portrait of a Lady (1977); Caption: "The fair skin of a modest woman. Coyness and pain gradually open the flower of pleasure!"
- Directed by: Kōyū Ohara
- Written by: Oniroku Dan; Seiji Matsuoka
- Produced by: Yoshiki Yūki
- Starring: Naomi Tani; Yuko Asuka; Minoru Ōkochi
- Cinematography: Shōhei Andō
- Edited by: Atsushi Nabeshima
- Music by: Cosmos Factory
- Distributed by: Nikkatsu
- Release date: October 1, 1977
- Running time: 66 min (1.10 h)
- Country: Japan
- Language: Japanese

Fascination: Portrait of a Lady (幻想夫人絵図, Gensō fujin ezu) is a 1977 Japanese film in Nikkatsu's Roman porno series, directed by Kōyū Ohara and starring Naomi Tani. Known for an ability to direct well in many genres, it was the pop-art-influenced Ohara's first true S&M film.

== Synopsis ==
Hisako Ōuchi (Naomi Tani) is the sexually frustrated wife of the older art academy Professor Ōuchi (Minoru Ōkochi). Ōuchi is a repressed conservative who disdains modern art, and expels Kazuo Kobayashi (Tachiki Bessho), a student who specializes in SM painting. Hisako becomes obsessed with the expelled student, and has an affair with him. Kazuo and Hisako retire to a cabin in the countryside where they indulge in SM activities.

== Cast ==
- Naomi Tani as Hisako Ōuchi
- Minoru Ōkochi as Professor Ōuchi
- Tachiki Bessho as Kazuo Kobayashi
- Yūko Asuka as Akemi
- Eisuke Izumi as Shimoda

== Background ==
Director Kōyū Ohara had directed films at Nikkatsu in various genres, in his experimental, pop-art influenced style, earning him the nickname "King of Pop Art Porn". Though he had included some SM themes in earlier films, Fascination: Portrait of a Lady was his first true SM film. The script was written by Naomi Tani's frequent collaborator, the noted SM-author Oniroku Dan.

Of his intent in the film, Ohara said, "It represents Japanese stylistic elegance. Needless to say, Naomi Tani's beauty is an integral part of the film, but I totally devoted myself to capturing Dan's luxurious S&M world through art... by placing small art objects throughout the film."

== Critical appraisal ==
In his article "The Films of Koyu Ohara", Graham Lewis notes that Naomi Tani gives a typically excellent performance in the film. He writes that the scene in which Tani proudly displays her new rope tattoo is "both heartbreaking and liberating". "Just with her eyes", Lewis writes, "she conveys all the sadness/excitement and horror/delight of a woman caught in an emotional and sexual whirlwind. Of director Ohara's work, Lewis comments, "Overall, the film looks great. The lighting, widescreen compositions, and editing are all pretension free, but artistic nonetheless. With this first SM film, Ohara had already revealed himself to be a master filmmaker as well as a master pervert."

In their Japanese Cinema Encyclopedia: The Sex Films, the Weissers write, "This movie still enjoys all the Ohara idiosyncrasies, solidifying his reputation as the king of pink pop-art."

== Availability ==
Fascination: Portrait of a Lady was re-released on DVD in Japan on March 21, 2007, as part of Geneon's seventh wave of Nikkatsu Roman porno series.

== Bibliography ==
=== English ===
- Gensō fujin ezu (1977) at IMDb
- "Gensō fujin ezu". Complete Index to World Film.
- Lewis, Graham R. "The Films of Koyu Ohara" in Asian Cult Cinema, #27 (2nd quarter 2000), p. 24–29.
- Sharp, Jasper (2008). Behind the Pink Curtain: The Complete History of Japanese Sex Cinema. Guildford: FAB Press. ISBN 978-1-903254-54-7.
- Weisser, Thomas; Yuko Mihara Weisser (1998). Japanese Cinema Encyclopedia: The Sex Films. Miami: Vital Books : Asian Cult Cinema Publications. ISBN 1-889288-52-7.

=== Japanese ===
- 団鬼六 幻想夫人絵図(1977) (in Japanese). allcinema.net.
- 幻想夫人絵図 (in Japanese). Japanese Cinema Database (Agency for Cultural Affairs). Archived from the original on 2012-03-11.
- 幻想夫人絵図 (in Japanese). Japanese Movie Database.
- 幻想夫人絵図(邦画) (in Japanese). Kinema Junpo. Archived from the original on 2011-10-07.
- 団鬼六・幻想夫人絵図 (in Japanese). www.nikkatsu-romanporno.com. Archived from the original on 2011-07-14.
