= Shōgorō Nishimura =

Japanese film director (1930–2017)

- Born: January 18, 1930; Shiga Prefecture, Japan
- Died: August 1, 2017 (aged 87)
- Occupation: Film director

Shōgorō Nishimura (西村昭五郎, Nishimura Shōgorō; January 18, 1930 – August 1, 2017) was a Japanese film director.

== Filmography ==
- Moeru Tairiku (1968)
- Cruel Female Love Suicide (1970)
- Apartment Wife: Affair in the Afternoon (1971)
- Affair at Twilight (1972)
- Drifter's Affair (1972)
- Sigh of Roses (1972)
- Apartment Wife: Secret Rendezvous (1972)
- White Skin Glimmering In the Darkness (1972)
- Apartment Wife: Afternoon Bliss (1972)
- Love Affair Exposed (1972)
- Afternoon Affair: Rear Window (1972)
- Confessions of an Adolescent Wife: Shocking! (1973)
- Confessions of an Adolescent Wife: Climax! (1973)
- Apartment Wife: Playing with Fire (1973)
- Injū no yado (1973)
- Sex-Crime Coast: School of Piranha (1973)
- Wandering Seagull: Night In Kushiro (1973)
- Apartment Wife: Afternoon Seduction (1974)
- Gypsy Rose: A Docu-Drama (1974)
- Hihon: midaregumo (1974)
- Karūserumaki: yoru wa watashi o nurasu (1974)
- Morning Frenzy (1974)
- Secret Book: Peeled Egg (1975)
- New Apartment Wife: Prostitution In Building #113 (1975)
- Red Light Tobita Brothel (1975)
- Trembling (1975)
- New Lesbian World: Rapture (1975)
- Lady Ecstasy: Pleasure Profound (1976)
- Apartment Wife: Flesh Financing (1976)
- Cage of Lust: Wives' Afternoon (1976)
- Exposure: Call Girl's Testimony (1976)
- Midsummer Night's Affair: Bliss (1976)
- Lusty Wife: Temptation of Flesh (1976)
- Tissue Paper By the Geisha's Pillow (1977)
- The Red Petal Is Wet (1977)
- Lady Black Rose (1978)
- Rope Cosmetology (1978)
- Rope and Skin (1979)
