= List of Japanese films of 1979 =

A list of films released in Japan in 1979 (see 1979 in film).

Japanese films released in 1979
Title	Director	Cast	Genre	Notes
Adventures of the Polar Cubs	Chikao Katsui		—N/a	Animated film
Alice the Movie – Utusukushiki kizuna	Takashi Tsuboshima	Shinji Tanimura, Takao Horiuchi, Toru Yazawa	Documentary	
The Castle of Cagliostro	Hayao Miyazaki			Animated film
Eisu wo nerae	Toru Dezak		—N/a	Animated film
Faraway Tomorrow	Tatsumi Kumashiro	Tomokazu Miura, Tomisaburo Wakayama, Ayumi Ishida		
Rudolph and Frosty's Christmas in July	Arthur Rankin Jr., Jules Bass	Red Buttons, Ethel Merman, Mickey Rooney, Alan Sues, Jackie Vernon, Shelley Winters, Paul Frees, Billie Mae Richards, Hal Peary, Shelby Flint, Don Messick	Animated	
Galaxy Express 999	Rintaro		—N/a	Animated film
G.I. Samurai	Kosei Saito	Sonny Chiba, Isao Natsuki, Tsunehiko Watase		
Golden Partners	Kiyoshi Nishimura	Tomokazu Miura, Tatsuya Fuji, Misako Konno		
Grass Labyrinth	Shuji Terayama	Juzo Itami		
Hana machi no haha	Katsumi Nishikawa	Kayo Matsuo, Yuko Kotegawa, Nagisa Okuma		
The House of Hanging	Kon Ichikawa	Koji Ishizaka, Yoshiko Sakuma, Junko Sakurada		
Jigoku	Tatsumi Kumashiro	Mieko Harada, Kyōko Kishida, Ryuzo Hayashi		
Jukyusai no Chizu	Mitsuo Yanagimachi	Yuji Honma, Keizo Kanie		
Kamisama naze ainimo kokyoga aruno	Yasuhiro Yishimatsu	Tomiyuki Kunishiro, Carol Rickson, Takenori Nurano		
Kampaku sengen	Shue Matsubayashi	Shigeharu Sada, Yuko Natori, Ichiro Zaitsu		
Lady Oscar	Jacques Demy	Catriona MacColl, Barry Stokes, Christine Böhm		Japanese-French co-production
The Last Game	Kihachi Okamoto	Toshiyuki Nagashima, Hirotarō Honda, Keiko Takeshita		
The Man Who Stole the Sun	Kazuhiko Hasegawa	Kenji Sawada, Bunta Sugawara, Kimiko Ikegami		
Midare karakuri	Susumu Kodama	Yūsaku Matsuda, Hiroko Shiino, Masaya Oki		
Mouhozue wa tsukanai	Yoichi Azuma	Kaori Momoi, Eiji Okuda, Leo Morimoto		
Nomugi Pass	Satsuo Yamamoto	Shinobu Otake, Mieko Harada, Chikako Yuri		
Onmitsu doshin-O Edo sosamo	Akinori Matsuo	Hiroki Matsukata, Tetsuro Sagawa, Sanae Tsuchida		
Piiman 80	Masami Orisaku	Hayato Tani, Yasuhiro Arai, Kimie Shingyoji		
Rope and Skin	Shōgorō Nishimura	Naomi Tani	Roman porno	Naomi Tani's final film
Tenshi wo yuwaku	Toshihachi Fujita	Momoe Yamaguchi, Tomokazu Miura, Yutaka Nakajima		
Toraburuman—Warauto korosuzo	Kensho Yamashita	Eiko Kawashima, Ichiro Zaitsu, Yumi Takigawa		
The Resurrection of the Golden Wolf				
Tora-san, the Matchmaker	Yoji Yamada	Kiyoshi Atsumi	Comedy	23rd in the Otoko wa Tsurai yo series
Tora-san's Dream of Spring	Yoji Yamada	Kiyoshi Atsumi	Comedy	24th in the Otoko wa Tsurai yo series
Vengeance is Mine	Shohei Imamura	Ken Ogata, Rentarō Mikuni, Chocho Miyako	Crime	
Wet Weekend	Kichitaro Negishi	Junko Miyashita, Ako		
Woman with Red Hair	Tatsumi Kumashiro	Junko Miyashita	Roman porno	Best Actress, Kinema Jumpo & Hochi Film Awards
Shokei Yugi				
Ultraman	Akio Jissoji	Susumu Kurobe, Akiji Kobayashi, Sandayu Dokumamushi, Masanari Nihei, Hiroko Sakurai	Kaiju	
Ultraman: Great Monster Decisive Battle	Noriko Anakura	Susumu Kurobe, Akiji Kobayashi, Sandayu Dokumamushi, Masanari Nihei, Hiroko Sakurai	Kaiju	

== See also ==
- 1979 in Japan
- 1979 in Japanese television

== Footnotes ==
=== References ===
- Beck, Jerry (2005). The Animated Movie Guide. Chicago Review Press. ISBN 1569762228.
- Galbraith IV, Stuart (1994). Japanese Science Fiction, Fantasy and Horror Films. McFarland. ISBN 0-89950-853-7.
- Galbraith IV, Stuart (2008). The Toho Studios Story: A History and Complete Filmography. Scarecrow Press. ISBN 978-1461673743.
