= 1st Yokohama Film Festival =

1980 Japanese film festival edition

- Location: Tsurumi, Kanagawa, Japan
- Founded: 1980
- Festival date: 3 February 1980

The 1st Yokohama Film Festival (第1回ヨコハマ映画祭) was held on 3 February 1980 in Keihin Film Theatre, Tsurumi, Kanagawa, Japan.

== Awards ==
- Best Film: The Man Who Stole the Sun
- Best New Actor: Yuji Honma – Jūkyūsai no Chizu
- Best Actor: Ken Ogata – Vengeance Is Mine
- Best Actress: Yūki Mizuhara – Angel Guts: Red Classroom
- Best New Actress: Miyuki Matsuda – The Adventures of Kosuke Kindaichi
- Best Supporting Actor: Keizō Kanie – Angel Guts: Red Classroom, Jūkyūsai no Chizu
- Best Supporting Actress: Ako – The Woman with Red Hair, Wet Weekend
- Best Director:
  - Kazuhiko Hasegawa – The Man Who Stole the Sun
  - Chūsei Sone – Angel Guts: Red Classroom
- Best New Director: Mitsuo Yanagimachi – Jūkyūsai no Chizu
- Best Screenplay: Masaru Baba – Vengeance Is Mine
- Best Cinematography: Seizō Sengen – The Resurrection of the Golden Wolf, Hakuchū no Shikaku
- Special Prize:
  - Junko Miyashita (Career)
  - Shin'ya Yamamoto (director?) (Career)

== Best 10 ==
1. The Man Who Stole the Sun
2. The Woman with Red Hair
3. Angel Guts: Red Classroom
4. Motto Shinayaka ni Motto Shitataka ni
5. Vengeance Is Mine
6. Aftermath of Battles Without Honor and Humanity
7. Jūkyūsai no Chizu
8. Tenshi no Yokubō
9. Wet Weekend
10. Keiko
