= 12th Yokohama Film Festival =

1991 film festival in Yokohama, Japan

- Location: Kannai Hall, Yokohama, Kanagawa, Japan
- Founded: 1980
- Festival date: 10 February 1991

The 12th Yokohama Film Festival (第12回ヨコハマ映画祭) was held on 10 February 1991 in Kannai Hall, Yokohama, Kanagawa, Japan.

== Awards ==
- Best Film: The Cherry Orchard
- Best Actor: Masato Furuoya – Uchū no hōsoku
- Best Actress: Yuki Saito – Hong Kong Paradise
- Best New Actress:
  - Saki Takaoka – Swimming Upstream
  - Hiroko Nakajima – The Cherry Orchard
  - Riho Makise – Tugumi, Tokyo Heaven
- Best Supporting Actor: Keizo Kanie – Ready to Shoot, Boku to, bokura no natsu
- Best Supporting Actress: Tomoko Nakajima – Tugumi
- Best Director: Shun Nakahara – The Cherry Orchard
- Best New Director: Joji Matsuoka – Swimming Upstream
- Best Screenplay: Hiroaki Jinno – The Cherry Orchard
- Best Cinematography: Norimichi Kasamatsu – Swimming Upstream, Tekken
- Best Music Score: Shigeru Umebayashi – Tekken
- Special Prize:
  - Yoshio Harada (Career)
  - Kōji Wakamatsu (Career)

== Best 10 ==
1. The Cherry Orchard
2. Ready to Shoot
3. Swimming Upstream
4. Boiling Point
5. Tekken
6. Tugumi
7. Uchū no hōsoku
8. Tenamonya Connection
9. Saraba Itoshino Yakuza
10. Hong Kong Paradise

runner-up: Childhood Days
