= The Woman with Red Hair =

- Film poster
- Directed by: Tatsumi Kumashiro
- Written by: Haruhiko Arai
- Based on: Akai kami no onna by Kenji Nakagami
- Produced by: Akira Miura
- Starring: Junko Miyashita; Renji Ishibashi; Ako; Miyako Yamaguchi; Kai Atō
- Cinematography: Yonezo Maeda
- Edited by: Akira Suzuki
- Music by: Yuukadan
- Distributed by: Nikkatsu
- Release date: February 17, 1979 (Japan)
- Running time: 73 minutes
- Country: Japan
- Language: Japanese

The Woman with Red Hair (Japanese: 赫い髪の女, Hepburn: Akai kami no onna) is a 1979 Japanese film directed by Tatsumi Kumashiro and written by Haruhiko Arai. It is based on a novel of the same name by Kenji Nakagami. The film was produced by Nikkatsu during their Roman Porno period, and released by the company on 17 February 1979, in Japan.

== Cast ==
- Junko Miyashita as Woman with red hair
- Renji Ishibashi as Kozo
- Ako as Kazuko
- Miyako Yamaguchi as Haruko
- Kai Atō as Takao
- Moeko Ezawa as Kozo's sister

== Awards ==
=== Wins ===
- Best Actress, Junko Miyashita – Hochi Film Awards
- Best Actress, Junko Miyashita – Kinema Jumpo
- Best Supporting Actress, Ako – Yokohama Film Festival
- Fourth Best Film of the Year – Kinema Jumpo

=== Nominations ===
- Best Actress, Junko Miyashita; Best Director, Tatsumi Kumashiro; Best Screenplay, Haruhiko Arai; Best Sound, Fumio Hashimoto – Japan Academy Prize 1980

== See also ==
- List of Nikkatsu Roman Porno films

== Sources ==
- Akai kami no onna (1979) at IMDb
- "赫い髪の女 (Akai kami no onna)" (in Japanese). Japanese Movie Database.
- Crow, Jonathan. "Woman with Red Hair". Allmovie.
- Parsons, Symon. "Woman with Red Hair (movie review)". eyeforfilm.co.uk.
- Weisser, Thomas; Yuko Mihara Weisser (1998). Japanese Cinema Encyclopedia: The Sex Films. Miami: Vital Books : Asian Cult Cinema Publications. pp. 79–80. ISBN 1-889288-52-7.
