= Tappei Shimokawa =

Japanese actor (1928–2004)

- Born: December 11, 1928; Fukuoka, Japan
- Died: March 25, 2004 (aged 75); Fukuoka
- Occupation: Actor
- Years active: 1954–2004

Tappei Shimokawa (下川 辰平, Tappei Shimokawa; December 11, 1928 – March 25, 2004) was a Japanese actor.

He attended Musashino Art University, but withdrew before completing his degree. In 1964, he joined Bungakuza Theatre Company but left in 1977.

He is well known for his role as Chōsan (Detective Tarō Nozaki) in the detective drama television series Taiyō ni Hoero!. His notable films are The Sands of Kurobe (1968), Akira Kurosawas film Dodes'ka-den (1970) and Kimi yo Fundo no Kawa o Watare (1976).

== Selected filmography ==
=== Films ===
- The Sands of Kurobe (1968)
- Portrait of Hell (1969)
- Dodes'ka-den (1970)
- Karei-naru Ichizoku (1974)
- Failed Youth aka Bitterness of Youth (1974)
- Prophecies of Nostradamus (1974)
- Manhunt (1976)
- Bandits vs. Samurai Squadron (1978)
- A Distant Cry from Spring (1980)
- The Catch (1983)
- Boku to, bokura no natsu (1990)
- Edo Jō Tairan (1991)
- After the Rain (1999)

=== Television ===
- Ten to Chi to (1969)
- Haru no Sakamichi (TV series) (1971)
- Taiyō ni Hoero! (1972–1982, 1987) – Taro Nozaki
- Kunitori Monogatari (1973)
- Ronin of the Wilderness (1974) (2nd season, ep. 22 and 39)
- Oretachi wa Tenshi da! (1979)
- Choshichiro Edo Nikki (1983-1991) - Miyake Kakubei
- School Wars: Hero (1984) – Yamashiro
- Ponytail wa Furimukanai (1986)
