= Mizuhara =

Mizuhara (written: 水原 lit. "water plain") is a Japanese surname. Notable people with the surname include:

- Hiroki Mizuhara (水原 大樹, born 1975), Japanese footballer
- Ippei Mizuhara (水原 一平, born 1984), Japanese interpreter
- Kiko Mizuhara (水原 希子, born 1990), Japanese model and actress
- Yūki Mizuhara (水原 ゆう紀, born 1953), Japanese actress

Fictional characters:

- Koyomi "Yomi" Mizuhara (水原 暦), character in the manga series Azumanga Daioh
- Fuyumi Mizuhara (水原 冬美), character in the Food Wars!: Shokugeki no Soma
- Max Mizuhara, character in the anime series Beyblade
- Sara Mizuhara, a character from the film Ultraman (2004 film)
