= Retreat Through the Wet Wasteland =

- Theatrical release poster
- Directed by: Yukihiro Sawada
- Written by: Kazuhiko Hasegawa
- Starring: Yuri Yamashina; Takeo Chii; Maki Kawamura; Hirokazu Inoue; Akira Takahashi
- Cinematography: Yoshihiro Yamazaki
- Edited by: Shinya Inoue
- Music by: Mio Tama
- Distributed by: Nikkatsu
- Release date: June 23, 1973 (Japan)
- Running time: 73 minutes
- Country: Japan
- Language: Japanese

Retreat Through the Wet Wasteland (Japanese: 濡れた荒野を走れ, Hepburn: Nureta koya o hashire) is a 1973 Japanese film in Nikkatsu's Roman Porno series, directed by Yukihiro Sawada and starring Yuri Yamashina and Takeo Chii.

== Synopsis ==
A group of five policemen engages in all sorts of corrupt activity including the rape of a girl resulting in her death. They rob a church of funds intended to go to Vietnamese refugees. During the investigation of the robbery, they use their position to frame a local teenage gang.

== Cast ==
- Takeo Chii: Gorō Harada
- Yuri Yamashina: Mariko Shimizu
- Maki Kawamura: Kyōko Nakamura
- Hirokazu Inoue: Kenichi Nakamura
- Akira Takahashi: Keiji Katō
- Kōsuke Hisamatsu: Minister
- Sayori Shima: High school girl
- Masako Minami: High school girl
- Setsuko Ōyama: Prostitute

== Background ==
Nikkatsu, still in the early stages of the difficulties associated with the trial over Love Hunter (1972), was reluctant to release a film about police brutality and corruption. The high-profile staff was able to convince the executives to green-light the production, but made one compromise with the title. The addition of the word "Wet" made the film sound more like a typical Roman Porno sex film than one that dealt with serious social issues. The media controversy over the film, as well as a condemnation from a Minister of Internal Affairs only served as free publicity for the film, and it became an immediate box-office hit. The film's influence went beyond the pink film genre. Many Japanese critics claim the film noir-style anti-hero in Japanese cinema—represented in films ranging from Kinji Fukasaku's Graveyard of Honor (1975) to the films of Takeshi Kitano—had its origins in Retreat Through the Wet Wasteland.

Director Yukihiro Sawada was known for his efforts in attempting to elevate Nikkatsu's Roman Porno films above their pink film origins, such as in his previous Sex Hunter: Wet Target (1972) and later Assault! (1976). He was particularly known for bringing social issues to the pink film, such as violence, racial prejudice and police corruption. Later in his career he brought the thriller genre into his Roman Pornos. Screenwriter Kazuhiko Hasegawa went on to direct the acclaimed The Man who Stole the Sun (1979).

Lead actress Yuri Yamashina had been an actress in the pink film genre before the inception of Nikkatsu's Roman Porno series in 1971. Acting under the name Saeko Tsugawa, she was associated with director Kan Mukai's studio, appearing for the director in such films as Cruel Story of a Sex Film Actress (1968). Yamashina had been featured in a few previous Roman Porno films, but her first starring film for Nikkatsu was Retreat Through the Wet Wasteland.

== Availability ==
Retreat Through the Wet Wasteland was released theatrically in Japan on June 23, 1973. It was released on DVD in Japan on March 24, 2006, as part of Geneon's third wave of Nikkatsu Roman Porno series.

== Bibliography ==
=== English ===
- "NURETA KOYA O HASHIRE". Complete Index to World Film.
- Nureta koya o hashire (1973) at IMDb
- Weisser, Thomas; Yuko Mihara Weisser (1998). Japanese Cinema Encyclopedia: The Sex Films. Miami: Vital Books : Asian Cult Cinema Publications. ISBN 1-889288-52-7.

=== Japanese ===
- 濡れた荒野を走れ(1973) (in Japanese). allcinema.net.
- 濡れた荒野を走れ (in Japanese). Japanese Cinema Database (Agency for Cultural Affairs).
- 濡れた荒野を走れ (in Japanese). Japanese Movie Database.
- 濡れた荒野を走れ(邦画) (in Japanese). Kinema Junpo.
