= Angel Guts: Red Classroom (film) =

1979 film

- Film poster
- Directed by: Chūsei Sone
- Screenplay by: Takashi Ishii
- Produced by: Yoshiyuki Kaino
- Starring: Yūki Mizuhara; Keizo Kanie; Jun Aki
- Cinematography: Nobumasa Mizunō
- Edited by: Jun Nabeshima
- Music by: Tsutomu Izumi
- Production company: Nikkatsu
- Release date: January 6, 1979 (Japan)
- Running time: 79 minutes
- Country: Japan
- Language: Japanese

Angel Guts: Red Classroom (Japanese: 天使のはらわた 赤い教室, Hepburn: Tenshi No Harawata Akai Kyoshitsu) is a 1979 Japanese film directed by Chūsei Sone and released by the Nikkatsu studio as part of their Roman porno line. It is the second in the Angel Guts film series, based on a manga by Takashi Ishii.

== Synopsis ==
Writer Muraki becomes obsessed with a porn starlet, Nami, while doing a feature story on her. They begin a short romance after he discovers that Nami was an unwilling participant in a porn film and that its rape sequence was real. When he finds her again, years later, she has descended into prostitution.

== Cast ==
- Yūki Mizuhara as Nami Tsuchiya
- Keizo Kanie as Tetsuro Muraki
- Jun Aki (あきじゅん) as Keiko Kawashima
- Minako Mizushima (水島美奈子) as Yuko Kawana

== Background ==
Although this is the second in the Angel Guts series from Nikkatsu, it is the first written by Takashi Ishii and introduces Muraki and Nami as names for the main characters in the series. Ishii's interest was in exploring the relationships between men and women – especially how men view women. Muraki in this film has trouble distinguishing between his idealized image of Nami and her reality.

== Critical appraisal ==
The Weissers call this one of director Chūsei Sone's best films and give it a rating of three and a half stars out of four, while critic Jasper Sharp considers it not only one of Sone's best works, but one of the finest of the entire Roman porno series.

== Legacy ==
American avant-garde band Xiu Xiu named their 2014 album after the film.

== Awards ==
1st Yokohama Film Festival

- Won: Best Director - Chūsei Sone
- Won: Best Actress - Yūki Mizuhara
- Won: Best Supporting Actor - Keizo Kanie
- 3rd Best Film
