= Jūkyūsai no Chizu =

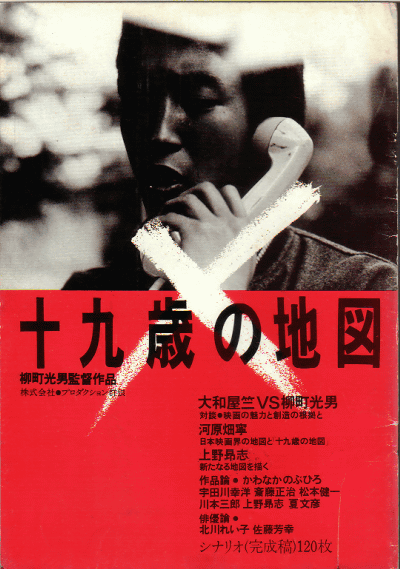
- Movie flyer
- Directed by: Mitsuo Yanagimachi
- Written by: Mitsuo Yanagimachi (script); Kenji Nakagami (novel)
- Produced by: Nakamura Kenichi
- Starring: Yūji Honma; Keizō Kanie
- Music by: Itabashi Fumio
- Release date: 1979
- Running time: 110 minutes
- Country: Japan
- Language: Japanese

Jūkyūsai no Chizu (Japanese: 十九歳の地図), also known in English as A 19-Year-Old's Map, is a 1979 coming-of-age Japanese film written and directed by Mitsuo Yanagimachi. It is the director's first feature fiction film. It is based on the Kenji Nakagami novel of the same name. The lead actor, Yūji Honma, made his fiction debut here after appearing in Yanagimachi's documentary from 1978. The film depicts an introverted and embittered young man in the process of becoming an adult and discovering the loneliness of life and the failings of human beings. It was voted the 7th best Japanese film of the year by Kinema Junpo.

== Plot ==
Yoshioka Masaru is a 19-year-old who comes from an impoverished background in the countryside. He attends a preparatory school, has no real goals or aspirations in life, and has apparently no experience with girls. To make ends meet, he works as a newspaper delivery boy. To alleviate his frustration, he carries around a notebook in which he makes notes on and assigns "marks" to all his customers on the route. If they irritate him in any way, he gives them a mark. Customers who show kindness to him, such as giving him sweets, or leaving thank you letters, are also resented and given marks. When they accumulate three marks, he begins to cause trouble for them, starting with cruel anonymous phone calls from a payphone. He tortures the dog of an owner when the dog nips at him, calls in threats to bomb houses through their gas lines while pretending to be a right-wing activist, and phones just to berate people he deems unworthy.

As he goes through his depressed life, he continues to assign grades arbitrarily to others based on what he sees. Sometimes he feels sympathy for them, and removes marks. There are fights in the next-door apartment constantly. He, too, fights with others in town.

He and his friends spend their free time boxing at a local gym. His best friend Konno, who is in his 30s, is obsessed with a woman named Maria, and dreams of growing up, becoming a champion boxer and running away with her. Though his raving about her, it is not clear whether or not Maria exists, or he is simply building a fantasy of what kind of life he wants to lead. When Masaru finally does meet her, she is anything but the idealized saint Konno had painted her as. Ugly, fat and scarred, Konno praises her as being their sad reality in human form. It frustrates Masaru.

At work, he and his co-workers make light of their unfortunate situation in life. Masaru talks big about goals and ideals, but he is cruel and lazy when not in front of others, so does not come off sympathetically. He grows increasingly paranoid and petty, even when the situation is good. He sees everyone in his slum as "unworthy," no matter how mean or nice they are to him. His work on his map continues, and he digs himself deeper and deeper into his dark hole of existence.

One day Konno goes to prison for fighting to protect Maria's honor. With Konno in prison, though, Maria tries to seduce Masaru the first chance she gets. Masaru yells at her that Konno was the only person who would ever love her, and that she is better off dead. Maria tries to kill herself by breathing in the gas from the heater. She cries that she has been trying to die for years, and can never die.

Masaru continues with his prank calls, this time to Tokyo Station. He says he has put a bomb on a train. But he is not believed. This angers him further, and he breaks down in tears. A few days later, he's on his paper route when he spots Maria digging a dress out of the trash with joy. She dances with it, ecstatic with her find. She notices Masaru and tries to approach him, but he runs away.

== Cast ==
- Yoshioka Masaru - Honma Yuji - The protagonist
- Konno - Kanie Keizo - Masaru's best friend
- Maria - Okiyama Hideko - the woman Konno obsesses over
- Shopowner - Yamaya Hatsuo

== Awards ==
1st Yokohama Film Festival

- Best Supporting Actor - Kanie Keizo
- Best New Director - Yanagimachi Mitsuo
- Best Newcomer - Honma Yuji
- 7th Best Film

== Notes ==
- Kenji Nakagami's novel paints a picture of the post-student movement society.
- Actor Honma Yuji (Yoshioka) was a leader of a bike gang, who was discovered by director Yanagimachi while he was shooting a documentary.
- Singer Yutaka Ozaki wrote his album "Seventeen's Map" in 1984 after seeing this movie.
- The movie was filmed in Oji, in one of the last slum areas left over from the war. It was demolished less than a year after the film was released.
