= Himatsuri =

Himatsuri may refer to:

- Himatsuri (film), 1985 Japanese drama film
- Himatsuri (professional wrestling)
