= Lusty Sisters =

- Theatrical poster for Lusty Sisters (1972)
- Directed by: Chūsei Sone
- Written by: Saburō Hatano
- Starring: Keiko Tsuzuki; Akemi Nijō
- Cinematography: Shigeyoshi Mine
- Edited by: Atsushi Nabeshima
- Music by: Sansaku Okuzawa
- Distributed by: Nikkatsu
- Release date: November 29, 1972 (Japan)
- Running time: 73 minutes
- Country: Japan
- Language: Japanese

Lusty Sisters (Japanese: 色情姉妹, Hepburn: Shikijō shimai), also known as Erotic Sisters, is a 1972 Japanese film in Nikkatsu's Roman porno series, directed by Chūsei Sone and starring Keiko Tsuzuki and Akemi Nijō.

== Synopsis ==
Three sisters live alienated existences in modern-day Tokyo. One works as a secretary, one is a prostitute, and one is a criminal. The secretary is cynically unhappy with the sexist business world which limits her opportunities for advancement and makes her a target for her lecherous boss. The prostitute lives an aimless life, drifting between men, and often the target of either police or jealous wives. The criminal, who lives by disrupting the society which oppresses her two sisters, is the only happy one of the three.

== Cast ==
- Akemi Nijō: Satsuki Ōtsuki
- Keiko Tsuzuki: Shinobu Ōtsuki
- Senro Sō: Sumire Ōtsuki
- Chigusa Takayama: Fujie Ōtsuki
- Kenji Shimamura: Denkichi Ōtsuki
- Nobutaka Masutoko: Honda Rokurō
- Hiroyuki Mikawa: Ichirō Sawaki
- Kiyoko Ōtani: Miyo Sawaki
- Mako Mizuki: Yōko Ikuta

== Background and critical appraisal ==
In their Japanese Cinema Encyclopedia: The Sex Films, the Weissers fault the film for its story, but praise director Sone for raising the film above its exploitation origins. According to the Weissers, the film is "a great looking production", and Sone gives the characters humanity. Nevertheless, they point out, in line with the exploitation genre, Sone delivers some "chillingly savage" moments. Allmovie agrees that the film is "not for the timid", but judges that it was one of Nikkatsu's better Roman Pornos of 1972. Dealing with societal alienation, self-destruction and violence, the film works with themes that director Hisayasu Satō would make his own in the 1980s and 1990s.

Director Chūsei Sone worked as an assistant director to Seijun Suzuki during the 1960s. He is probably best known for the first two episodes of the Angel Guts series, which he directed in 1978 and 1979. Lead actress Keiko Tsuzuki had a leading role in Yasuharu Hasebe's Kurosawa satire, Naked Seven (1974).

== Availability ==
Lusty Sisters was released theatrically in Japan on November 29, 1972. It was released on DVD in Japan on December 22, 2006, as part of Geneon's sixth wave of Nikkatsu Roman porno series.

== Bibliography ==
=== English ===
- "SHIKIJO SHIMAI". Complete Index to World Film.
- Shikijo shimai (1972) at IMDb
- Sharp, Jasper (2008). Behind the Pink Curtain: The Complete History of Japanese Sex Cinema. Guildford: FAB Press. ISBN 978-1-903254-54-7.
- Weisser, Thomas; Yuko Mihara Weisser (1998). Japanese Cinema Encyclopedia: The Sex Films. Miami: Vital Books : Asian Cult Cinema Publications. ISBN 1-889288-52-7.

=== Japanese ===
- 色情姉妹(1972) (in Japanese). allcinema.net.
- 色情姉妹 (in Japanese). Japanese Cinema Database (Agency for Cultural Affairs).
- 色情姉妹 (in Japanese). Japanese Movie Database.
- 色情姉妹(邦画) (in Japanese). Kinema Junpo.
