= Tenshi no Yokubō =

- Film poster
- Directed by: Ikuo Sekimoto
- Starring: Sumie Sasaki; Shinobu Yūki; Kan Mikami; Terumi Azuma; Sayoko Tanimoto
- Release date: October 6, 1979 (Japan)
- Country: Japan
- Language: Japanese

Tenshi no Yokubō (Japanese: 天使の欲望), also known as The Desire of Angels, is a 1979 Japanese film directed by Ikuo Sekimoto.

== Cast ==
- Sumie Sasaki
- Shinobu Yūki
- Kan Mikami
- Terumi Azuma
- Sayoko Tanimoto

== Awards ==
1st Yokohama Film Festival

- 8th Best Film
