= Blue Collar (film) =

1978 American crime drama film

- Theatrical release poster
- Directed by: Paul Schrader
- Written by: Paul Schrader; Leonard Schrader
- Produced by: Don Guest
- Starring: Richard Pryor; Harvey Keitel; Yaphet Kotto
- Cinematography: Bobby Byrne
- Edited by: Tom Rolf
- Music by: Jack Nitzsche
- Production company: T.A.T. Communications Company
- Distributed by: Universal Pictures
- Release date: February 10, 1978 (United States)
- Running time: 114 minutes
- Country: United States
- Language: English
- Budget: $1.7 million
- Box office: $6.5 million

Blue Collar is a 1978 American crime drama film directed by Paul Schrader in his directorial debut. Written by Schrader and his brother Leonard, the film stars Richard Pryor, Harvey Keitel and Yaphet Kotto. The film is both a critique of union practices and an examination of life in a working-class Rust Belt enclave.

Schrader, who wrote the script for Taxi Driver (1976), recalls the shooting as being very difficult because of the artistic and personal tensions he had with the actors (including the stars themselves). Schrader has also stated that while making the film, he suffered an on-set mental breakdown, which made him seriously reconsider his career.

The film was shot in Detroit and Kalamazoo, Michigan.

== Plot ==
A trio of Wayne County, Michigan, auto workers, two black—32-year-old Ezekiel "Zeke" Brown from Detroit, Michigan, and two-time ex-convict, 35-year-old Sam "Smokey" James from Mississippi, who spent time in Michigan State Prison—and one 33-year-old white, a Polish-American from Hamtramck, Michigan, Jerry Bartowski are fed up with their mistreatment at the hands of both management and the union brass. Smokey is in debt to a loan shark over a numbers game, Jerry works a second job as a gas station attendant to get by and finds himself unable to pay bills including the orthodontics work that his daughter needs, and Zeke is in trouble with the IRS for tax evasion by filing returns showing fictitious children in order to reduce his family's taxable income.

Coupled with the financial hardships on each man's end, the trio hatch a plan to rob a safe at United Auto Workers union headquarters. They commit the caper but find only $600 in petty cash. However, they do come away with a ledger which contains evidence of the union's illegal loan operation and ties to organized crime syndicates in Las Vegas, Chicago and New York. They decide to make an attempt to blackmail the union with the information. Meanwhile, a local loan shark has given Smokey advice on how to crack the safe in exchange for a percentage of the robbed proceeds. He gets busted by the police for his ties in an unrelated crime and attempts to get off or receive a softer conviction in exchange for spilling off the information about the trio's robbery & blackmailing. This information subsequently gets back to the union, and they begin to retaliate strongly by turning the tables on the three friends. Jerry experiences a near miss one evening when a pair of hired thugs show up at his house to attack his wife, but both get intercepted and beaten up by Smokey. The next day at work, a suspicious accident at the plant results in Smokey's death that is investigated as a work accident caused by negligent safety protocols, which Zeke and Jerry realize was a murder coordinated by the union bosses due to the incriminating knowledge they possess against the union.

FBI agent John Burrows attempts to coerce Jerry into material witness or cooperating witness on the union's corruption, which would make him an adversary of his co-workers as well as the union bosses. At the same time, corrupt union bosses succeed in coopting Zeke to work for them with promises of upward mobility being promoted to shop steward and increased remuneration. Zeke, happy with his new duties and higher pay, pragmatically prescinds from seeking justice for Smokey's murder, as it would jeopardize his newfound standing within the ranks of the union. Jerry attempts to convince Zeke to take steps to avenge Smokey's death, but Zeke rebukes him, telling Jerry that nothing will bring Smokey back and that they should just move forward. Later that evening, two gunmen, hired by the mob, try to shoot Jerry in a drive-by shooting while traveling through the Detroit–Windsor Tunnel. This evolves into a chase where Jerry ends up crashing his car but is rescued by the police. Disgusted with Zeke's capitulation and terrified after an attempt on his life, Jerry decides to cooperate with the FBI and a United States Congress special Congressional committee that have been investigating the union.

In the end, as Jerry enters the plant with federal agents, Zeke confronts him. Once friends, Jerry and Zeke now turn on each other as a heated discussion escalates into them attempting to attack each other, confirming the prescient earlier narrative that union corruption divides workers against one another.

== Cast ==
- Richard Pryor as Ezekiel "Zeke" Brown
- Harvey Keitel as Jerry Bartowski
- Yaphet Kotto as Sam "Smokey" James
- Ed Begley Jr. as Bobby Joe
- Harry Bellaver as Eddie Johnson
- George Memmoli as Jenkins
- Lucy Saroyan as Arlene Bartowski
- Lane Smith as Clarence Hill
- Cliff DeYoung as John Burrows
- Borah Silver as "Dogshit" Miller
- Chip Fields as Caroline Brown
- Tracey Walter as Union Member
- Harry Northup as Hank
- Leonard Gaines as Mr. Berg, IRS Man
- Milton Selzer as Sumabitch
- Sammy Warren as Barney
- Jimmy Martinez as Charlie T. Hernandez

== Production ==
The film was shot on location at the Checker plant in Kalamazoo, Michigan, and at locales around Detroit, including the Ford River Rouge Complex on the city's southwest side and the MacArthur Bridge to Belle Isle.

The three main actors did not get along and were continually fighting throughout the shoot. The tension became so great that at one point Richard Pryor (supposedly in a drug-fueled rage) pointed a gun at Schrader and told him that there was "no way" he would ever do more than three takes for a scene.

Schrader stated that during the filming of one take, Harvey Keitel became so irritated by Pryor's lengthy improvisations that he made eye contact with the camera and flung the contents of an ashtray into its lens, to make the take containing Pryor's ad libbing unusable. Pryor and his bodyguard responded by pinning Keitel to the floor and pummeling him with their fists. While Keitel and Yaphet Kotto got along on set, Pryor reportedly did not get along with Kotto either, and at one point attempted to attack him with a chair, but was disarmed by Pryor's assistant before he could reach his target. Keitel and Kotto also became irritated with Schrader for telling them not to improvise and instead follow the script during filming, despite originally encouraging them to act spontaneously if need be, due to it being his directorial debut. The two classically trained actors' styles also clashed with Pryor's improvisational work, with Keitel and Kotto's ad-libs focused on the drama of the scene, while Pryor's improvisation was comedic. Most of the character Zeke's jokes in the final film came from Pryor himself.

Jack Nitzsche's blues-flavored score includes "Hard Workin' Man", a collaboration with Captain Beefheart.

== Reception ==
Blue Collar was universally praised by critics. The film holds a 96% "Fresh" rating on the review aggregate website Rotten Tomatoes based on 46 reviews. The site's consensus states: "Paul Schrader's Blue Collar offers a searing, darkly funny indictment of labor exploitation and rampant consumerism that's fueled by the outstanding work of an excellent cast." Metacritic, which uses a weighted average, assigned the film a score of 77 out of 100, based on 12 critics, indicating "generally favorable" reviews. Both Roger Ebert and Gene Siskel lauded the film. Ebert awarded the film four stars in his print review for The Chicago Sun-Times, saying Keitel, Pryor and Kotto were "at the top of their forms", with Pryor showing skill as a dramatic performer beyond his earlier more comedic roles. Ebert also praised Schrader's decision to avoid cliches or tidy sanitized storytelling. Siskel placed Blue Collar in fourth position on his list of the ten best of 1978.

Filmmaker Spike Lee included the film on his essential film list "Films All Aspiring Filmmakers Must See". The New York Times placed the film on its Best 1000 Movies Ever list.

In his autobiography Born to Run, Bruce Springsteen names Blue Collar and Taxi Driver as two of his favorite films of the 1970s.

== See also ==
- Heist film
