= Farewell to the Land =

1982 film

- Film poster
- Directed by: Mitsuo Yanagimachi
- Written by: Mitsuo Yanagimachi
- Produced by: Michiko Ikeda; Tetsuya Ikeda; Mitsuo Yanagimachi
- Starring: Jinpachi Nezu; Kumiko Akiyoshi; Jirō Yabuki; Miyako Yamaguchi; Gō Awazu
- Cinematography: Masaki Tamura
- Edited by: Sachiko Yamaji
- Music by: Toshiaki Yokota
- Release date: 9 April 1982 (Japan)
- Running time: 130 minutes
- Country: Japan
- Language: Japanese

Farewell to the Land (Japanese: さらば愛しき大地, Hepburn: Saraba Itoshiki Daichi) is a 1982 Japanese drama film directed by Mitsuo Yanagimachi. It was entered into the 32nd Berlin International Film Festival.

== Cast ==
- Jinpachi Nezu as Yukio Yamazawa
- Kumiko Akiyoshi as Junko
- Jirō Yabuki as Akihiko Yamazawa (as Jirō Yabuki)
- Miyako Yamaguchi as Fumie Yamazawa
- Gō Awazu as Driver
- Sumiko Hidaka as Ine Yamazawa
- Yudai Ishiyama as Manager
- Keizō Kanie as Daijin
- Nenji Kobayashi as Farmer
- Kōjirō Kusanagi as Takejirō Yamazawa
- Seiji Matsuyama as Fumie's brother
- Yuichi Minato as Office worker
- Aoi Nakajima as Fumiko
- Rei Okamoto as Taiwanese woman
- Kiminobu Okumura as Koichirō Yamazawa
