= Mitsuo Yanagimachi =

Japanese screenwriter and film director (born 1945)

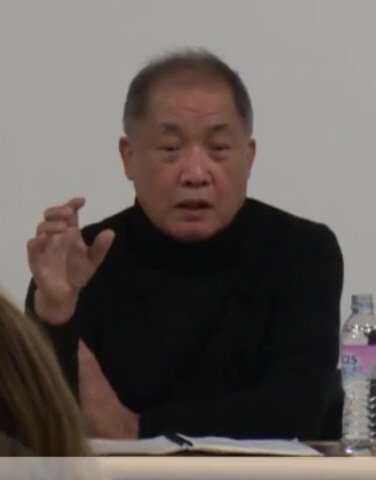
- Born: November 2, 1945 (age 80); Ibaraki Prefecture, Japan
- Occupation: Film director

Mitsuo Yanagimachi (柳町光男, Yanagimachi Mitsuo; born November 2, 1945) is a Japanese screenwriter and film director.

== Career ==
Born in Namegata District, Ibaraki, Yanagimachi attended the Faculty of Law at Waseda University but began studying filmmaking. Working as a freelance assistant director after graduating, he started his own production company in 1974 and produced the documentary film God Speed You! Black Emperor (1976) about bōsōzoku. He made his fiction film debut in 1979 with Jūkyūsai no Chizu. That and the later Himatsuri were based on novels by Kenji Nakagami. His 1982 work Saraba Itoshiki Daichi showed in the Competition at the Berlin Film Festival. His films have often focused on youth (Who's Camus Anyway?), on ethnic minorities in Japan (Ai ni Tsuite, Tokyo), as well as on Asia (Shadow of China and the documentary Tabisuru Pao-jiang-hu).

Yanagimachi was awarded the Geijutsu Senshō Prize in 1985 by the Agency for Cultural Affairs.

== Filmography as director ==
1. God Speed You! Black Emperor (1976; documentary)
2. Jūkyūsai no Chizu (A 19-Year-Old's Map) (1979)
3. Saraba Itoshiki Daichi (Farewell to the Land) (1982)
4. Himatsuri (Fire Festival) (1985)
5. Shadow of China (1989)
6. Ai ni Tsuite, Tokyo (About Love, Tokyo) (1992)
7. Tabisuru Pao-jiang-hu (Travelling Medicine Peddlers) (1995; documentary)
8. Who's Camus Anyway? (2005)

== Awards ==
Year	Award	Film	Festival
1980	Best New Director	Jūkyūsai no Chizu	Yokohama Film Festival
1985	Ernest Artaria Award	Himatsuri	Locarno International Film Festival
1986	Rotterdam Award	Himatsuri	Rotterdam International Film Festival
1992	Interfilm Award - Honorable Mention	Ai ni tsuite, Tokyo	Mannheim-Heidelberg International Film Festival
1992	Special Jury Prize	Ai ni tsuite, Tokyo	Tokyo International Film Festival
2005	Japanese Eyes: Best Film	Kamyu nante shiranai	Tokyo International Film Festival
