= Yoshiharu Yamaguchi =

Japanese rugby union player (1943–2026)

- Born: 15 February 1943 Mihama, Fukui, Japan
- Died: 29 May 2026 (aged 83)
- School: Wakasa Higashi High School
- University: Nihon University

Rugby union career
- Position: Flanker
Amateur team(s)
Years	Team	Apps	(Points)
- Nihon University RFC
International career
Years	Team	Apps	(Points)
1967–1973	Japan	13	(94)

Yoshiharu Yamaguchi (山口 良治, Yamaguchi Yoshiharu; 15 February 1943 – 29 May 2026) was a Japanese rugby union player. He made his debut for Japan against a touring New Zealand Universities team in Osaka on 12 March 1967. He last appeared for Japan against England's under 23 team in Twickenham on 13 October 1973.

Yamaguchi inspired the Japanese television series School Wars and the film School Wars: Hero which are based on his true story.

Yamaguchi died from a stroke on 29 May 2026, at the age of 83.
