= Fire Festival (film) =

1985 Japanese film

- A poster with the transliterated version of the original Japanese title: Himatsuri
- Directed by: Mitsuo Yanagimachi
- Written by: Kenji Nakagami
- Produced by: Kazuo Shimizu
- Starring: Kin'ya Kitaōji; Kiwako Taichi; Norihei Miki
- Cinematography: Masaki Tamura
- Edited by: Sachiko Yamaji
- Music by: Tōru Takemitsu
- Production companies: Seibu Saizon Group; Cine Saizon; Production Gunrō
- Distributed by: Cine Saizon
- Release date: 25 May 1985 (Japan)
- Running time: 125 minutes
- Country: Japan
- Language: Japanese

Fire Festival (Japanese: 火まつり, Hepburn: Himatsuri) is a 1985 Japanese drama film directed by Mitsuo Yanagimachi. It was screened in the Un Certain Regard section at the 1985 Cannes Film Festival.

== Cast ==
- Kin'ya Kitaōji as Tatsuo
- Kiwako Taichi as Kimiko
- Norihei Miki as Yamakawa
- Junko Miyashita as Sachiko, Tatsuo's wife
- Ryota Nakamoto as Ryota
- Aiko Morishita as Nursery school teacher
- Rikiya Yasuoka as Toshio
- Jūkei Fujioka as coolie
- Kenzo Kaneko as Kimiko's brother-in-law
- Sachiko Matsushita as Tatsuo's Sister
- Aoi Nakajima as Kimiko's sister
- Gozo Soma as (as Gôzô Sôma)
- Kin Sugai as Tatsuo's Mother
- Masako Yagi as Tatsuo's Sister

== Awards and nominations ==
40th Mainichi Film Awards

- Won: Excellence Film (shared with Sorekara, Typhoon Club and The Burmese Harp)
- Won: Best Actor – Kin'ya Kitaōji (also won for Haru no Kane)
- Won: Best Screenplay – Kenji Nakagami (shared with Yuji Kato for Typhoon Club)

10th Hochi Film Awards

- Won: Best Actor – Kin'ya Kitaōji (also won for Haru no Kane)

59th Kinema Junpo Best Ten Awards

- Won: Best Leading Actor – Kin'ya Kitaōji
