= Shadow of China =

1989 film by Mitsuo Yanagimachi

- Theatrical release poster
- Directed by: Mitsuo Yanagimachi
- Screenplay by: Richard Maxwell; Mitsuo Yanagimachi
- Based on: Snake Head by Masaaki Nishiki
- Produced by: Don Guest; Elliott Lewitt
- Starring: John Lone; Sammi Davis; Vivian Wu
- Cinematography: Toyomichi Kurita
- Edited by: Sachiko Yamaji
- Music by: Yasuaki Shimizu
- Production companies: Fuji Television Network; Nissho-Iwai; Marubeni; Nippon Herald; Sotsu; Sunrise Inc.
- Distributed by: Fine Line Features
- Release date: October 1989 (Tokyo)
- Running time: 131 minutes
- Countries: United States; Japan
- Language: English

Shadow of China is a 1989 drama film directed and co-written by Mitsuo Yanagimachi and starring John Lone, Sammi Davis and Vivian Wu. It is based on the novel Snake Head by Masaaki Nishiki. It was the first Japanese-American co-production financed entirely in Japan, and the first English-language film by director Yanagimachi.

== Plot summary ==
A Chinese political refugee tries to make his way to the top as a businessman in Hong Kong, while his former radicalism is transformed into cynicism. His past comes back to haunt him.

== Cast ==
- John Lone as Henry
- Kōichi Satō as Akira
- Sammi Davis as Katharine
- Vivian Wu as Moo-Ling
- Roland Harrah III as Xiao Niu
- Roy Chiao as Lee Hok Chow
- Constantine Gregory as Jameson
- Colin George as Burke
- Kenneth Tsang as Mr. Lau
- Dennis Chan as Mr. Wu
- Fredric Mao as Chi Fung
- Simon Yam as Po Kok
- Junko Takazawa as Phantom Mother
- Justina Vail as Caroline
- Sam Neill as John Dermot
