= Choshichiro Edo Nikki =

- Also known as: 長七郎江戸日記
- Genre: Jidaigeki
- Directed by: Kōsei Saitō; Akinori Matsuo
- Starring: Kōtarō Satomi; Tappie Shimokawa; Shōhei Hino; Yumiko Nogawa; Tetsuro Tamba
- Country of origin: Japan
- Original language: Japanese
- No. of episodes: Season 1: 118, Season 2: 63, Season 3: 39

Production
- Running time: 45 minutes (per episode)
- Production company: Union Eiga

Original release
- Network: Nippon TV (NTV)
- Release: October 18, 1983 – September 24, 1991

Choshichiro Edo Nikki (長七郎江戸日記) (Choshichiro's Edo Diaries) was a long-running prime-time television series in Japan. The title character was Matsudaira Choshichiro Nagayori, the son of Tokugawa Tadanaga. The premise of the show focuses on Tadanaga's death as a result of an alleged plot to overthrow his elder brother, the third shōgun Tokugawa Iemitsu. Choshichiro lives among the commoners in the shogunal capital city of Edo. Kōtarō Satomi portrayed Choshichiro throughout the series.

== Plot ==
During the reign of the third shōgun Tokugawa Iemitsu, Choshichiro Nagayori Matsudaira, an exalted personage who was the shogun's nephew, disobeyed the shōgun's wish and left shogunate service. He was the son of Tadanaga Tokugawa, Suruga's chief councilor who lost his life vying for the shōgun's position with Iemitsu. Now he lives in Edo, working for a local newspaper, but secretly working to bring justice to the ordinary people of Edo.

== Broadcast ==
The show ran from 1983 to 1991 on the Nippon Television network. It occupied the Tuesday evening 8:00–8:54 time slot.

The first series began on October 18, 1983 and continued to December 23, 1986. It consisted of 125 episodes. The second series, 68 episodes long, ran from January 5, 1988 to September 26, 1989. The third (and last) series consisted of 40 episodes broadcast between October 16, 1990 and September 24, 1991.

Affiliates of the Nippon Television network have regularly rebroadcast the show. Most recently, the Jidaigeki Senmon Channel has carried the series on the Sky Perfect satellite. Some other stations also include it on their daytime schedules.

Selected episodes are available in boxed sets of DVDs.

It airs subtitled in Hawaii on Nippon Golden Network.

== Episode list ==
=== First series ===
- 1. The Double-Sided Notebook (両面ノート)
- 2. The Distinguished Event of the Falcon Presentation (ファルコンプレゼンテーションの特別なイベント)
- 3. The Elegant Festival (優雅な祭り)
- SP-1 (千姫有情、母ありき)
- SP-2 (天下を取れ!仕掛けられた反乱)
- SP-3 (柳生の陰謀)
- 51. The Golden Dream (黄金の夢)
- 52. The Phantom Mother (幻の母を見た)
- SP-4 (怨霊見参!長七郎、弟と対決)
- 60. (大江戸女番長始末記)
- 61. The Shogun Games (寛永御前試合・竜、立て!)
- 62. Two Tamasaburos (ふたり玉三郎)
- 63. Mother (おふくろさんよ‥‥)
- 64. (俺ァ江戸さ行くだ)
- 65. The One Mistake (たった一度のあやまち)
- 66. Mastermind (からくり人形使い)
- 67. Female Ninja's Love (くの一化粧)
- 68. Man on the Pardon Ship (御赦免船の男)
- 69. Spunk of Old Bandits (老盗の心意気)
- 70. Don't Cry, Tora (泣くな!寅)
- SP-5 (母は敵か?!正雪の陰謀)
- 71. Eager Young Constables (十手にかけた青春)
- 72. Face in the Lightning (稲妻に浮かぶ顔)
- 73. The Edo Protection Squad (大江戸警備隊始末)
- 74. Sheltering From the Rain (雨宿り)
- 75. The Demon Mansion (鬼が住む屋敷)
- 76. (おさとの災難)
- 77. The Power of Festival Music (とどけ夫婦囃子)
- 78. The Sloth (極楽とんぼ)
- 79. Brothers-in-Law (心はひとつ義兄弟)
- 80. A Single Bellflower (桔梗、花一輪)
- 81. A Demon's Tear (鬼の目に涙)
- 82. Harukoma Dancer (初姿春駒おどり)
- 83. Stepmother (当世母親気質)
- 84. Dad's Return (父ちゃんが帰った日)
- 85. The Target (標的になった男)
- 86. Father and Son Falcons (はばたけ父子鷹)
- 87. Harmony Crackers (夫婦せんべい)
- 88. (宅兵衛に娘がいた)
- 89. Lullaby for Mother and Son (母と子の子守唄)
- 90. Behind the Alluring Mask (あで姿回り舞台)
- 91. Crossroad (別れ道)
- 92. Sing Me a Lullaby (望郷子守唄)
- 93. Takubei Detained (居残り宅兵衛)
- SP-6. (風雲!旗本奴と町奴)
- 94. Old Wounds (古傷)
- 95. Grateful Otsuru (鶴の恩返し)
- 96. Always a Cop (十手かたぎ)
- 97. Falling in Love (恋に落ちて)
- 98. Tatsu's Woman Trouble (辰三郎、女難で候)
- 99. Target: Cho-san (娘仇討ち・敵は長さん!)
- 100. Gyu-san's Marriage (牛さんの縁談)
- 101. You'll Be Okay, Dad! (頑張れ!おとう)
- 102. Unrequited Love (片思い)
- 103. (謎のエゲレス時計)
- 104. Acting Like a Cop (目明し気取り)
- 105. (風の噂の風小僧)
- 106. Don't Cry Mountain Dove (泣くな山鳩)
- 107. Even Dragonflies Cry (とんぼ、ないた)
- 108. A Sad Story of Revenge (裏町恨み唄)
- SP-7 (血闘・荒木又右衛門)
- 109. A Tragic Love Song (黒髪情話)
- 110. I Hate Teacher (寺子屋ぎらい)
- 111. Oren is Speechless (おれん、絶叫!)
- 112. Where is the Miss? (お嬢様、どこに?)
- 113. Woman from the Mountains (山から来た女)
- 114. No-work Shinbei (なまくら新兵衛)
- 115. The Bringer of Death (殺しの配達人)
- 116. Goblin Reign of Terror (天狗におびえる街)
- 117. Good Lord for Aizu (名君、会津に入る)
- 118. Choshichiro's Final Showdown (長七郎最後の対決)

=== Second series ===
- SP-1 千姫有情、母ありき
- 1. Winter Camellia (散るが命か、寒椿)
- 2. Courageous Decision (意気に感ず)
- 3. The Fugitive Returns (帰って来た逃亡者)
- 4. Never Another Spring (手折られた白梅)
- 5. (仇討ちという殺人)
- 6. Spring is Near (春遠からじ)
- 7. Passing Shower (はしり雨)
- 8. Murder Counting Song (人斬り数え唄)
- 9. Princess Who Saw Hell (地獄を覗いた姫君)
- 10. Lonely Mother's Journey (母ひとり旅)
- 11. A Man Who Sold His Life (命を売る男)
- SP-2. (天下を取れ!仕掛けられた反乱)
- 12. A Tragic Woman (悲しい女)
- 13. Old Soldiers Don't Die (老兵は死なず)
- 14. Mom's Cooking (おふくろの味)
- 15. River Styx Bridge (三途の橋)
- 16. The Boy Who Loved Birds (小鳥を愛した少年)
- 17. Love's Courier Service (夫婦飛脚・恋の綱引)
- 18. Hollyhock and Hydrangea (葵と紫陽花)
- 19. My Wife, My Life (妻こそ我が命)
- 20. (夢いくたび・母の暦)
- 21. (友情の命燃やして)
- 22. ()
- 23. ()
- 24. ()
- 25. ()
- 26. ()
- 27. ()
- 28. ()
- 29. ()
- 30. ()
- 31. ()
- 32. ()
- 33. ()
- 34. ()
- 35. ()

== Cast ==
These are the main characters in the show.

- All series
  - Choshichiro: Kōtarō Satomi
  - Tatsusaburō (Tatsu): Shōhei Hino
  - Miyake Takubei: Tappei Shimokawa
  - Oren: Yumiko Nogawa
  - Yagyū Munefuyu: Tetsuro Tamba (special appearances)
  - Narrator: Taketoshi Naitō (Series 1, part), Ryō Kurosawa (Series 1 (part), 2, 3)
- Series 1
  - Gyūkichi (Gyū-san): Kaku Takashina (1919–1994)
- Series 2
  - Tomokichi: Ichirōta Miyakawa
  - Ogin: Miho Takagi
- Series 3
  - Naniwaya Kikuzō: Gannosuke Ashiya (1931–2004)
  - Onatsu: Chizuru Azuma
