= Ikuo Sekimoto =

Japanese film director and screenwriter (born 1942)

- Born: July 18, 1942 (age 84); Kyoto, Japan
- Occupations: film director and screenwriter

Ikuo Sekimoto (関本郁夫, Sekimoto Ikuo; born July 18, 1942 in Kyoto) is a Japanese film director and screenwriter.

== Filmography ==
=== Director ===
2004 School Wars: Hero
1995 Gokudo no onna-tachi: Akai kizuna aka Yakuza Ladies: Blood Ties
1994 Shinonomerō onna no ran
1990 Nozomi Witches (live-action)
1988 Crazy Boys
1985 Dan Oniroku kinbaku manji-zeme
1984 Dan Oniroku nawazeme
1983 Jotei aka Empress
1981 Danpu wataridori
1979 Tenshi no Yokubō
1976 Ooku ukiyo-buro
1975 Kōshoku: Genroku (maruhi) monogatari
