= Wet Weekend =

- Film poster

Japanese name
- Kanji: 濡れた週末
Transcriptions
- Revised Hepburn: Nureta Shumatsu
- Directed by: Kichitaro Negishi
- Written by: Fumio Kōnami
- Starring: Junko Miyashita; Ako
- Production company: Nikkatsu
- Release date: September 22, 1979 (Japan)
- Running time: 71 minutes
- Country: Japan
- Language: Japanese

Wet Weekend (Japanese: 濡れた週末, Hepburn: Nureta Shumatsu) is a 1979 Japanese film in Nikkatsu's Roman porno series, directed by Kichitaro Negishi and starring Junko Miyashita.

== Synopsis ==
Miyashita plays an office clerk who is having an affair with her married boss. Since he refuses to leave his wife, Miyashita and another couple plan to kidnap his daughter to collect a ransom.

== Cast ==
- Junko Miyashita as Shimako Maruyama
- Aoi Nakajima (中島葵) as Noriko Goto
- Junichiro Yamashita (山下洵一郎) as Junichiro Goto
- Ako as Tokiko Kazama

== Background ==
The Weisser's, in their book Japanese Cinema Encyclopedia: The Sex Films, remark that many critics saw similarities between this work and Akira Kurosawa's 1960 film The Bad Sleep Well.

== Awards and nominations ==
4th Hochi Film Award

- Won: Best Actress - Junko Miyashita

1st Yokohama Film Festival

- Won: Best Supporting Actress - Ako
- 9th Best Film
