= Kazuhiko Hasegawa =

Japanese film director (1946–2026)

- 長谷川 和彦
- Born: 5 January 1946; Kamo District, Hiroshima Prefecture, Japan
- Died: 31 January 2026 (aged 80)
- Occupations: Film director, screenwriter
- Years active: 1972–1991

Kazuhiko Hasegawa (長谷川 和彦, Hasegawa Kazuhiko; 5 January 1946 – 31 January 2026) was a Japanese film director. He won the award for Best Director at the 1st Yokohama Film Festival for The Man Who Stole the Sun.

== Life and career ==
Hasegawa began his career in film at Nikkatsu in the early 1970s as a scriptwriter on such Roman porno projects as Chūsei Sone's Love Bandit Rat Man (1972), Yukihiro Sawada's Retreat Through the Wet Wasteland (1973) and Tatsumi Kumashiro's Evening Primrose (1974). He also served as assistant director on the 1972 Woman on the Night Train and several other Roman porno films for Nikkatsu.

After leaving Nikkatsu, he made his debut as a director in the October 1976 The Youth Killer, produced by ATG, a provocative study of alienation focusing on a young killer. In 1979, he directed his second film, the black comedy The Man Who Stole the Sun, which won him the Best Director award at the 1979 Yokohama Film Festival. This was Hasegawa's last film and although he never returned to directing, he was one of the founding members of the Director's Company in 1982 where he devoted himself to helping young directors.

He also occasionally appeared as an actor, including a role in Banmei Takahashi's 1982 Wolf (狼, Ōkami), produced by Director's Company, and later in Seijun Suzuki's 1991 Yumeji.

Hasegawa died from multiple organ failure complicated by pneumonia, on 31 January 2026, at the age of 80.

== Filmography ==
- The Youth Killer (青春の殺人者, Seishun no satsujinsha) (1976)
- The Man Who Stole the Sun (太陽を盗んだ男, Taiyō o Nusunda Otoko) (1979)
