= Too Tired to Die =

1998 American-Korean film

- Spanish DVD cover
- Directed by: Wonsuk Chin
- Written by: Wonsuk Chin
- Produced by: Donna L. Bascom; Victor Hwang; Connie Kaiserman
- Starring: Takeshi Kaneshiro; Mira Sorvino
- Cinematography: Jim Denault
- Edited by: Merril Stern
- Music by: Mader
- Production companies: Black Swan Productions; Dream Search Entertainment
- Distributed by: Daiei
- Release dates: January 20, 1998 (Sundance); August 8, 1998 (Japan)
- Running time: 97 minutes
- Countries: United States; South Korea
- Languages: English; Japanese; Mandarin; Arabic; French; Cantonese; German

Too Tired to Die is a 1998 American-Korean independent comedy-drama film written and directed by Wonsuk Chin and starring Takeshi Kaneshiro (in his American debut) and Mira Sorvino. The film is about a young Japanese man who learns he has only twelve hours left to live. It was shot in June 1997 and premiered at the Sundance Film Festival on January 20, 1998, in the American Spectrum section.

== Cast ==
- Takeshi Kaneshiro as Kenji
- Mira Sorvino as Death / Jean
- Jeffrey Wright as Balzac Man
- Michael Imperioli as Fabrizio
- Geno Lechner as Pola
- Ben Gazzara as John Sage
- Sandra Prosper as Black Soldier
- David Thornton as Lulu
- Aida Turturro as Fortune Teller 1 & 2
- Kim Hye-soo as Anouk
- Drena De Niro as Waitress
- Ako as Mother
- Bill Dawes as Dante
- Lauren Fox as Susan
- Jamie Harrold as Air France Airport Clerk
