= Hammett (film) =

1982 film by Wim Wenders

- Theatrical release poster
- Directed by: Wim Wenders
- Screenplay by: Ross Thomas; Dennis O'Flaherty
- Story by: Thomas Pope
- Based on: Hammett by Joe Gores
- Produced by: Ronald Colby; Don Guest; Fred Roos
- Starring: Frederic Forrest; Peter Boyle; Marilu Henner; Roy Kinnear
- Cinematography: Joseph Biroc; Philip H. Lathrop
- Edited by: Janice Hampton; Marc Laub; Robert Q. Lovett; Randy Roberts
- Music by: John Barry
- Production company: Zoetrope Studios
- Distributed by: Orion Pictures; Warner Bros.
- Release date: May 1982 (Cannes)
- Running time: 95 minutes
- Country: United States
- Language: English
- Budget: $7 million
- Box office: $42,914

Hammett is a 1982 American neo-noir mystery film directed by Wim Wenders and executive produced by Francis Ford Coppola. The screenplay was written by Ross Thomas and Dennis O'Flaherty, based on the novel of the same name by Joe Gores. It stars Frederic Forrest as detective story writer Dashiell Hammett, who gets caught up in a mystery very much like one of his own stories. Marilu Henner plays Hammett's neighbor, Kit Conger, and Peter Boyle plays Jimmy Ryan, an old friend from Hammett's days as a Pinkerton agent. The film was entered into the 1982 Cannes Film Festival.

== Plot ==
San Francisco-based Dashiell Hammett, trying to put his Pinkerton detective days behind him while establishing himself as a writer, finds himself drawn back into his old life one last time by the irresistible call of friendship and to honor a debt. In 1928, Hammett, known to his librarian neighbor Kit and other acquaintances as "Sam" is holed up in a cheap apartment, hard at work at his typewriter each day. He drinks heavily, smokes too much and has coughing fits. One day, a friend and mentor from his Pinkerton days, Jimmy Ryan, turns up with a request, that Hammett help him track down a Chinese prostitute named Crystal Ling in the Chinatown district of San Francisco, an area Hammett is more familiar with than Ryan. Hammett is soon pulled into a multi-layered plot, losing the only copy of his manuscript, wondering how and why Ryan has vanished, being followed by a tough-talking gunsel, discovering a million-dollar blackmail scheme and being deceived by the diabolical Crystal, right up to a final confrontation near the San Francisco wharf.

== Cast ==
- Frederic Forrest as Dashiell Hammett
- Peter Boyle as Jimmy Ryan
- Marilu Henner as Kit Conger / Sue Alabama
- Roy Kinnear as English Eddie Hagedorn
- Elisha Cook Jr. as Eli the Taxi Driver
- Lydia Lei as Crystal Ling
- R. G. Armstrong as Lt. O'Mara
- Richard Bradford as Detective Bradford
- Michael Chow as Fong Wei Tau
- David Patrick Kelly as The Punk
- Sylvia Sidney as Donaldina Cameron
- Jack Nance as Gary Salt
- Elmer Kline as Doc Fallon
- Royal Dano as Pops
- Samuel Fuller as Old Man in Pool Hall
- Fox Harris as Frank the News Vendor

== Production ==
Critically acclaimed German director Wim Wenders was hired by Francis Ford Coppola to direct Hammett as his American debut feature. Coppola and the film's financing studio, Orion, were dissatisfied with the original version and nearly the entire film was reshot. This led to allegations that most of it was directed by Coppola: The A.V. Club review of the 2005 DVD even claimed "only 30 percent of Wenders' footage remained, and the rest was completely reshot by Coppola, whose mere 'executive producer' credit is just a technicality"; the reviewer does not give any sources (noting "A Coppola or Wenders commentary track might have sorted things out a bit — or at least settled an old score — but the bare-bones DVD release leaves viewers with a fascinating mess"), but argues "The finished product is clearly more Coppola than Wenders, since its period soundstage aesthetic so closely resembles One from the Heart, The Cotton Club, and other '80s Coppola productions." Another 2011 review mentions "rumours that Coppola was unhappy with Wenders’ directorial efforts and thus re-shot and re-edited much of the film himself, although Wenders denies this. It would certainly explain some of the film's oddities."

Wenders made a 17-minute "diary film" Reverse Angle (1982), which deals among others with "the editing process of HAMMETT in the presence of Francis Ford Coppola". In a 2015 interview, Wenders with "no traces of bitterness" stated unambiguously that he directed the reshoot (although Coppola tended to micro-manage his productions direction-wise): "there wasn't much money left, and I was too stubborn to drop it and or say, 'Well then let somebody else do it.' Francis [Ford Coppola] was too stubborn to fire me so we stuck it out and we respected each other in spite of all the conflict." The reshoot was "entirely in one sound stage", which Wenders avoids: "The first film was shot entirely on location […] in real places in San Francisco." Of that, "In the final product ten shots survived from my original shoot: only exteriors […] a couple of shots from the first, maybe 5% of the film from the first version." When Wenders later wanted to finish and release his director's cut as "an interesting case study", he found the material was destroyed: "They only kept a cut negative, everything else is junked."

== Casting ==
Boyle took over the role of Jimmy Ryan from Brian Keith, who left allegedly because the lengthy production conflicted with other commitments. Keith can be seen in some long shots in the film. A number of actors from the "Golden Age" of Hollywood were cast in the film, including Sylvia Sidney, Hank Worden, Royal Dano and Elisha Cook Jr. (who played Wilmer "the gunsel" in John Huston's 1941 film The Maltese Falcon).

== Reception ==
Reviewing the film in the New York Times, Vincent Canby stated that the film "isn't quite the mess one might expect, considering the length of time it's been in production and the number of people who seem to have contributed to it. It's not ever boring, but heaven only knows what it's supposed to be about or why it was made", concluding that the film "is neither good enough to exist on its own as straight film noir, like Lawrence Kasdan's Body Heat nor is it witty and funny enough to succeed as parody", although he did praise the film sets.

On the review aggregator website Rotten Tomatoes, 75% of 12 critics' reviews are positive.
