= Don Guest =

American film producer (1934–2010)

- Born: 1934; Oklahoma, United States
- Died: 2010 (aged 75–76); Tours, Indre-et-Loire, France
- Occupation: Film Producer
- Known for: Paris, Texas (film)
- Children: Genine, Steven and Diane

Don Guest (16 July 1934, in Oklahoma – 23 April 2010, in Tours) was an American film producer, best known for winning the Palme d'Or for a film he produced, Paris, Texas. He also frequently served as a production manager for many prominent directors of the era, including Sam Peckinpah, Peter Bogdanovich, Philip Kaufman, Michelangelo Antonioni. He moved with his parents to Los Angeles during the Dust Bowl migration. Guest got his start in TV, but most of his career was as a film production manager and producer.

He died in his home in Tours, Indre-et-Loire, France, where he had lived for 9 years. He was survived by his wife, Laurie; children Genine, Steven, and Diane; he also had three grandchildren.

== Credits ==
Producer

- Everglades! (1961, TV, associate)
- The White Dawn (1974, associate)
- Blue Collar (1978)
- Hammett (1982)
- The Osterman Weekend (1983, associate)
- Paris, Texas (1984)
- At Close Range (1986)
- Shadow of China (1989)

Production Manager

- It's About Time (1966), TV Series)
- Cowboy in Africa (1967, TV Series)
- Zabriskie Point (1970)
- The Last Picture Show (1971)
- Sounder (1972)
- The Getaway (1972)
- Breakheart Pass (1975)
- Herbie Goes to Monte Carlo (1977)
- Second Thoughts (1983)
- The Osterman Weekend (1983)
- The Night They Saved Christmas (1984, TV Movie)
