= Female Ninja Magic: 100 Trampled Flowers =

- Theatrical poster for Female Ninja Magic: 100 Trampled Flowers (1974)
- Directed by: Chūsei Sone
- Written by: Masaru Takasue
- Produced by: Hiromi Higuchi
- Starring: Junko Miyashita; Kyōko Kanō; Hitomi Kozue; Yūko Katagiri; Yuri Yamashina
- Cinematography: Masaru Mori
- Edited by: Masanori Tsujii
- Music by: Hajime Kaburagi
- Distributed by: Nikkatsu
- Release date: August 3, 1974 (Japan)
- Running time: 76 minutes
- Country: Japan
- Language: Japanese

Female Ninja Magic: 100 Trampled Flowers (Japanese: くノ一淫法 百花卍がらみ, Hepburn: Kunoichi inpo: hyakka manji-garimi) is a 1974 Japanese film in Nikkatsu's Roman porno series, directed by Chūsei Sone and starring Junko Miyashita.

== Synopsis ==
In historical times, the Shogun family employs a group of Iga ninjas to take over the Akizuki clan's lands. The Akizuki hire the Fumi ninjas, a group of female warriors who enhance their fighting ability with sexual magic such as the "white snake spell". When the Akizuki emerge victorious, Tsukinojo, the leader of the Fumi ninjas, marries Lord Akizuki.

== Cast ==
- Junko Miyashita: Tsukinojo 魔羅月之丞
- Kyōko Kanō: White Snake Woman
- Hitomi Kozue: White Snake Woman
- Yūko Katagiri
- Yuri Yamashina: Blue Fox
- Setsuko Ōyama: Koyuki
- Maya Hiromi: O-kei
- Hajime Tanimoto: Mamoru Wakasa
- Keisuke Yukioka: Sansaemon Horiguchi
- Hiroshi Osa: Hattori Hanzō
- Nagatoshi Sakamoto: Norizen Kuroiwa
- Hyōe Enoki: Kamekubi
- Tadayuki Kitakami: Gankubi
- Hitomi Kozue: お真知の方
- Naomi Oka: お蓮の方
- Tatsuya Hamaguchi: Ōmi
- Kenji Shimamura: Old man

== Background ==
The film anticipates the theme of Toei's In Bed With the Enemy: Female Ninjas (1976) which itself spawned several imitations. In their Japanese Cinema Encyclopedia: The Sex Films, the Weissers write that this indicates Nikkatsu's ability to keep current with the moods of popular culture. During the mid-1970s, when director Sone's output was uneven, the Weissers judge the film to show him at his best. It also serves as an example, they write, of popular actress Yūko Katagiri's variable career. Previously promoted as a star, her career had stalled due to her typecasting in teenage roles. She had expanded her acting range by starring in Tatsumi Kumashiro's successful Wet Lust: 21 Strippers (1974). By the time of the release of Female Ninja Magic: 100 Trampled Flowers, however, her star had again faded and she was relegated to fourth billing. Allmovie writes that the film is an "action-packed softcore melodrama".

== Availability ==
Female Ninja Magic: 100 Trampled Flowers was released theatrically in Japan on August 3, 1974. It was released to home video in VHS format on December 2, 1996.

== Bibliography ==
=== English ===
- "KUNOICHI NINPO: HYAKKA MANJI-GARIMI". Complete Index to World Film.
- Kunoichi ninpo: hyakka manji-garami (1974) at IMDb
- Sharp, Jasper (2008). Behind the Pink Curtain: The Complete History of Japanese Sex Cinema. Guildford: FAB Press. ISBN 978-1-903254-54-7.
- Weisser, Thomas; Yuko Mihara Weisser (1998). Japanese Cinema Encyclopedia: The Sex Films. Miami: Vital Books : Asian Cult Cinema Publications. ISBN 1-889288-52-7.

=== Japanese ===
- くノ一淫法 百花卍がらみ(1974) (in Japanese). allcinema.net.
- くノ一淫法 百花卍がらみ (in Japanese). Japanese Cinema Database (Agency for Cultural Affairs). Archived from the original on 2011-10-08.
- くノ一淫法 百花卍がらみ (in Japanese). Japanese Movie Database.
- くノ一淫法 百花卍がらみ(邦画) (in Japanese). Kinema Junpo. Archived from the original on 2011-10-07.
- くノ一淫法・百花卍がらみ (in Japanese). www.nikkatsu-romanporno.com. Archived from the original on 2009-03-28.
