= Boku to, bokura no natsu =

- Film poster
- Directed by: Yutaka Kohira
- Screenplay by: Fumio Konami
- Starring: Emi Wakui; Akira Ōtani; Keizō Kanie; Kenji Sawada
- Music by: Mickie Yoshino
- Distributed by: Toei Company
- Release date: November 3, 1990 (Japan)
- Running time: 110 minutes
- Country: Japan
- Language: Japanese

Boku to, bokura no natsu (Japanese: タイガースメモリアルクラブバンド ぼくと、ぼくらの夏), also known as Tigers Memorial Club Band: My Summer, and Our Summer, is a 1990 Japanese film directed by Yutaka Kohira and based on a novel by Yūsuke Higuchi.

== Cast ==
- Emi Wakui as Asako Sakai
- Akira Ōtani as Shun Togawa
- Keizō Kanie as Shuzo Togawa
- Keiko Saito as Yukiko Muraoka
- Shin Takuma as Toshio Kazami
- Misa Shimizu as Yoko Asakura
- Tappei Shimokawa as Hidematsu Yamada
- Yuriko Hoshi as Haruyo Sakai
- Karin Yamaguchi as Machiko Togawa
- Shinya Owada
- Yoshiaki Ueda
- Shirō Kishibe
- Kenji Sawada as Keigo Sakai

== Reception ==
=== Awards ===
12th Yokohama Film Festival

- Won: Best Supporting Actor - Keizō Kanie
