= Yūki Mizuhara =

Japanese actress

- Born: August 30, 1953 (age 73); Osaka, Japan
- Occupation: Actress

Yūki Mizuhara (水原ゆう紀) is a Japanese actress from Minoh, Osaka. She won the award for best actress at the 1st Yokohama Film Festival for the Nikkatsu Roman Porno film Angel Guts: Red Classroom. She also appeared in Nikkatsu's 1982 production Red Scandal: Affair, a "thinly-veiled replica of Luis Buñuel's Belle de Jour."

== Filmography ==
- Angel Guts: Red Classroom (1979)
- Miracle Girl (1980 TV series)
- Red Scandal: Affair (1982)
- Okinawan Boys (1983)
