= Bōsōzoku =

Japanese youth subculture

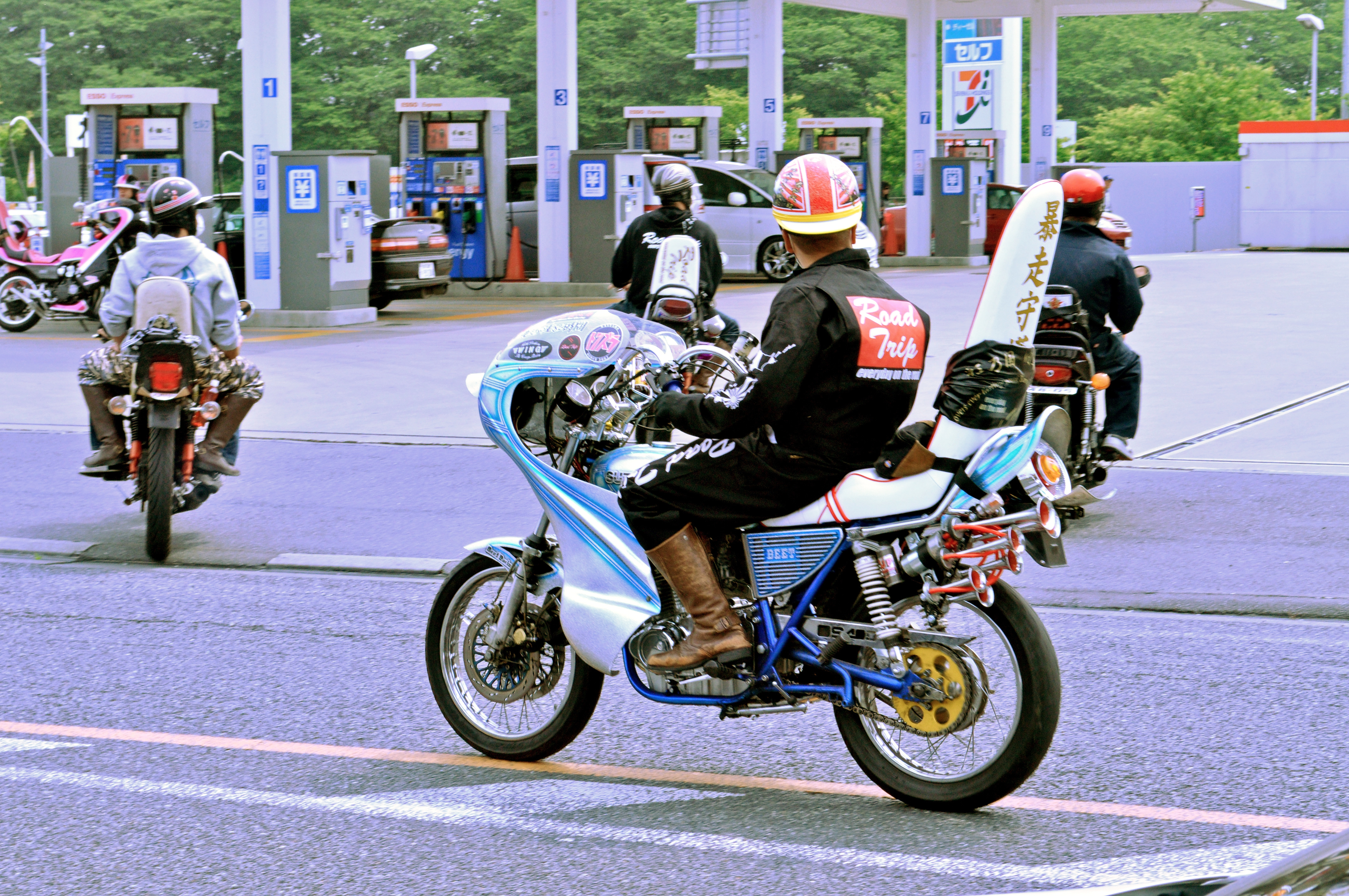
A group of bōsōzoku in 2013

Bōsōzoku (暴走族, lit. 'wild gang or group') is a Japanese youth subculture associated with customized motorcycles. The first appearance of these types of biker gangs was in the 1950s. Popularity peaked at an estimated 42,510 members in 1982. Their numbers dropped dramatically in the 2000s, with fewer than 7,297 members in 2012. Later, in 2020, a Bōsōzoku rally that used to attract thousands of members only had 53 members, with police stating that it was a long time since they had to round up that many people.

Bōsōzoku style traditionally involves boilersuits similar to those of manual laborers or leather military jackets with baggy pants, and tall boots. This uniform became known as the tokkō-fuku (特攻服, "special attack clothing") and is often adorned with kanji slogans. Typical accessories to this uniform are hachimaki, surgical masks, and patches displaying the Rising Sun Flag. Bōsōzoku members are known for taking Japanese road bikes and adding modifications such as over-sized fairings, lifted handle bars shifted inwards, large seat backs, extravagant paint jobs, and modified mufflers. Bōsōzoku styles take inspiration from choppers, greasers, and Teddy boys.

== History ==
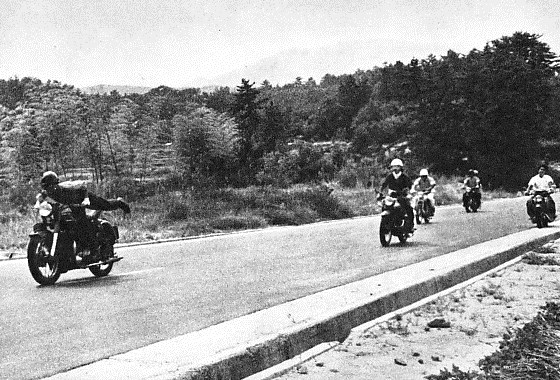
The bōsōzoku were preceded by the kaminarizoku, as young veterans adjusted to life in post-WWII Japan.

Bōsōzoku first started as groups of returning World War II veterans. The disobedient subculture originated in the 1950s when the young pilots came back from World War II. Many veterans faced difficulty readjusting to society after the war, and some turned to custom car making and gang-like activities on city streets to gain an adrenaline fix. These early bōsōzoku took inspiration from American greaser culture and imported Western films; bōsōzoku became known for its many similarities to old American biker culture. Many younger individuals began to see this style of life as very appealing, especially marginalized individuals looking for change. Eventually, these youngsters took over the identity, becoming the foundation for the modern bōsōzoku.

The 1970s were when the term of bōsōzoku first truly began to emerge. This was a period of time characterized by actual riots between police and many of these youth groups. The term bōsōzoku was not actually created by these biker groups, but was eventually widely adopted and used by these various groups. In the 1980s and 1990s, bōsōzoku would often embark on massed rides, in which up to 100 bikers would cruise together slowly en masse down an expressway or major highway. The motorcyclists would run toll booths without stopping and would ignore police attempts to detain them. New Year's Eve was a popular occasion for the massed rides. The bikers would sometimes smash the cars and threaten or beat up any motorists or bystanders who got in the way or expressed disapproval of the bikers' behavior. Participation in the gangs peaked at 42,510 members in 1982. This made bōsōzoku the prevailing form of youth delinquency within Japan.

Numbers slowly began to decline following the 1980s peak. It is reported that by the 1990s there were around 28,000 bōsōzoku sprinkled throughout the country. In 2004, the Japanese government passed a revised road traffic law which gave the police more power to arrest bikers riding recklessly in groups. With increased arrests and prosecutions, bōsōzoku participation rapidly went into decline. As of 2010, police reported that the new trend among bōsōzoku was to ride together in much smaller groups and to ride scooters instead of heavily modified motorcycles. Aichi prefecture was reported to have the highest number of riders, followed by Tokyo, Osaka, Ibaraki and Fukuoka. By 2015, there were only a reported 6,771 active bōsōzoku throughout Japan. In 2013, the National Police Agency re-classified bōsōzoku biker gangs as "pseudo-yakuza" organizations.

== Traits ==
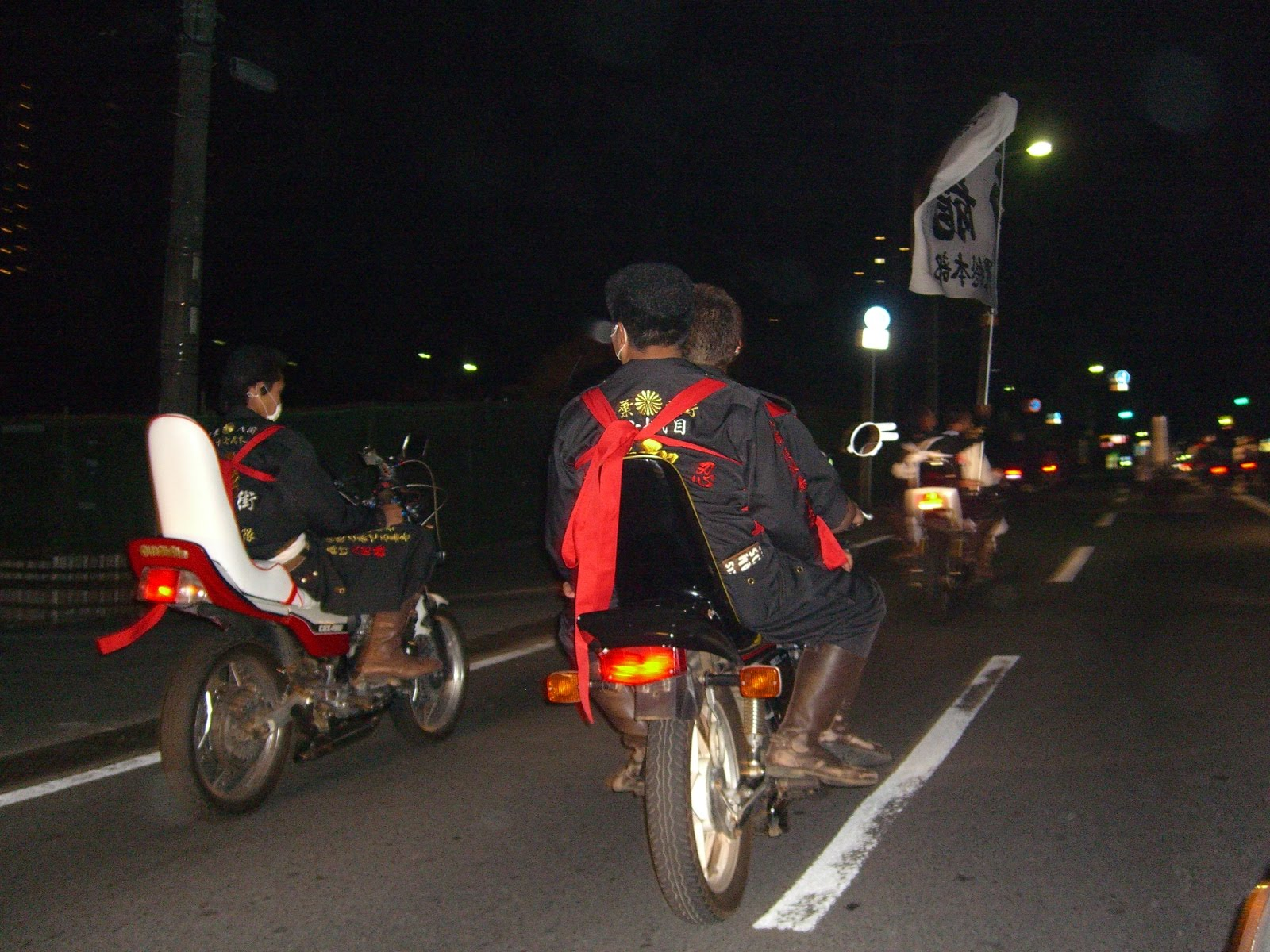
Bōsōzoku on a night ride

Bōsōzoku are usually between the ages of 16 and 20 years old. They are known for their style that heavily mimics greaser culture within the United States. This includes a pompadour style haircut, tokkō-fuku uniforms, which were often modified and embroidered jumpsuits, inspired by those worn by manual laborers during the WWII era, baggy pants and military boots. Tokkō-fuku were often embroidered with various slogans and large, intricate designs. They were seen as a status symbol to many, symbolizing both their pride in themselves and their strength. They were often worn open in the front, with bandage wrappings around their waist. They would also often be accompanied by rounded sunglasses and tasuki.

The word bōsōzoku is also applied to motorcycle subculture with an interest in motorcycle customizing, often illegal, and making noise by removing the mufflers on their vehicles so that more noise is produced. These bōsōzoku groups sometimes ride without motorcycle helmets (which in Japan is illegal), also engage in dangerous or reckless driving, such as weaving in traffic, and running red lights. Another activity is speeding in city streets, not usually for street racing but rather for thrills. With many bikes involved, the leading one is driven by the leader, who is responsible for the event and is not allowed to be overtaken. Japanese police call them Maru-Sō (police code マル走 or 丸走) and occasionally dispatch police vehicles to trail the groups of bikes for the reason of preventing possible incidents, which may include: riding very slowly through suburbs at speeds of 10–15 km/h (6.2–9.3 mph), creating a loud disturbance while waving imperial Japanese flags, and starting fights that may include weapons (such as wooden swords, metal pipes, baseball bats, and Molotov cocktails).

== Vehicles ==
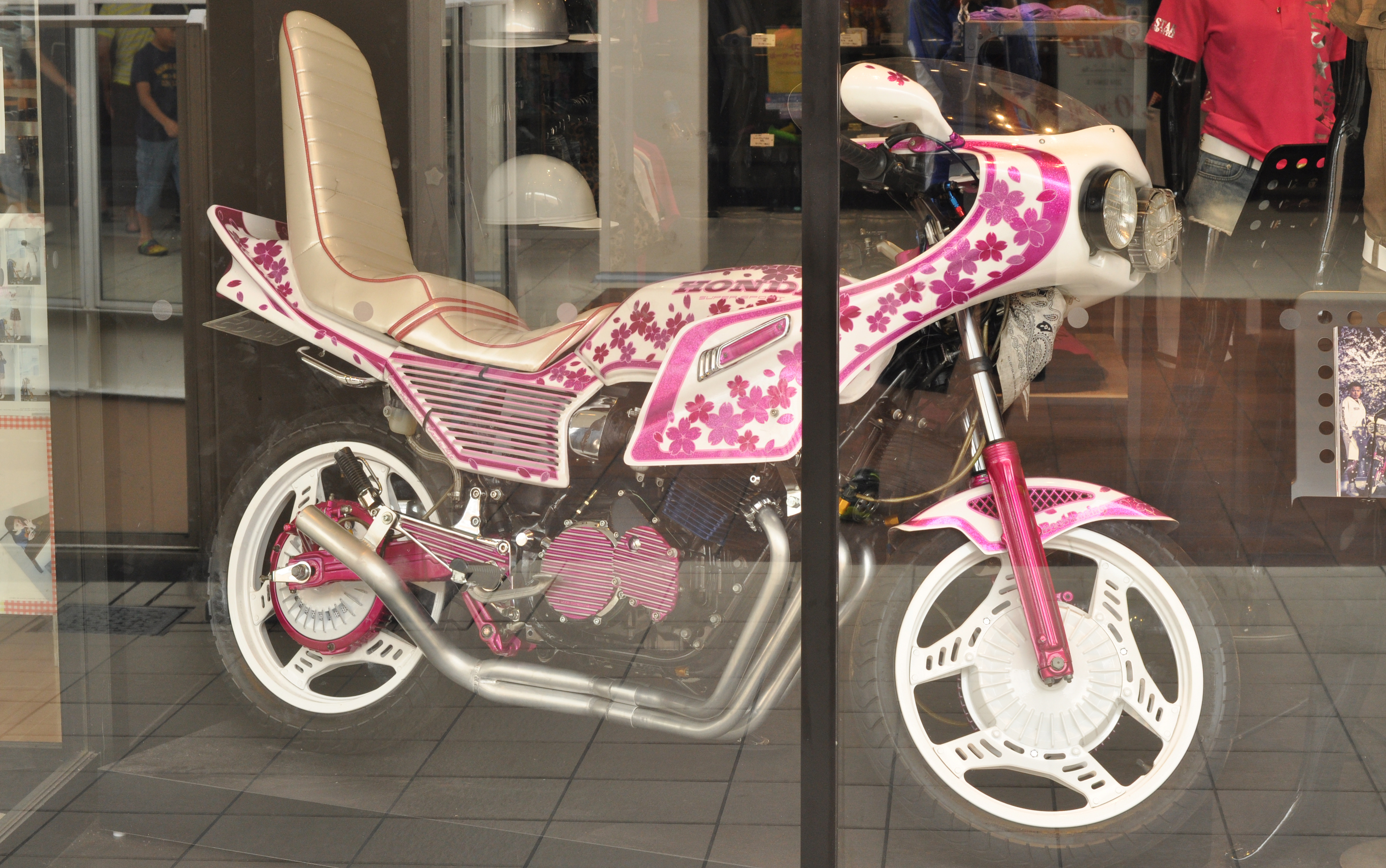
Bōsōzoku-style customized motorcycle

Bōsōzoku are known to modify their motorcycles in peculiar and showy ways, which are called Kaizōsha (改造車, "modified vehicles"). The general style of bōsōzoku bike modification appears to combine elements of an American chopper bike and a British café racer. Examples of modifications that are taken from these styles are raised handle bars like those on a chopper or over-sized fairings like those found on café racers (though bōsōzoku usually fit them much higher on the bike than their original position, and angled upwards at the front).

A typical customized bōsōzoku bike starts off by taking an average 250-400cc Japanese road bike, adding a shugo exhaust system (multiple tube header), squeezing the handlebars inwards (known as shibori, from the verb shiboru, "to squeeze"), and adding a three- or four-trumpet horn - sanren or yonren, respectively.

Loud paint schemes on the fenders or the gas tanks with motifs such as flames or kamikaze-style "rising sun" designs are also quite common. The bikes will often be adorned with stickers and/or flags depicting the gang's symbol or logo.

There are also marked regional differences in motorcycle modifications. For example, Ibaraki bōsōzoku are known to modify their motorcycles in an extensively colorful, flashy way. They will often have three or four oversized fairings in a tower-like way in and an abundance of lights.

In America, the term "Bosozoku" is also applied to cars that have undergone extreme modification. The term generally only applies to Japanese manufactured vehicles, and is somewhat interchangeable with the term "Kaido Racer". Broadly, "Bosozoku" refers to the concept of Japanese vehicle modification, whereas "Kaido Racer" refers specifically to car modification.

== Ties to organized crime ==
In general, the Japanese government sees bōsōzoku as highly organized groups, affiliated under several national federations. They generally have clear cut rules, uniforms, symbols, and other marks of organization. Some groups have membership fees and set punishments. These groups also make up a large proportion of Japanese criminal activity, being involved in vandalism, road traffic violations, and other criminal activity.

Their lives of crime generally do not end after they turn twenty, however. It is estimated that around 25% of bōsōzoku are above the age of twenty. Alongside that, they have been shown to have ties to various yakuza organizations. In fact, some numbers predict that as many as one-third of yakuza recruits come from one of a few bōsōzoku. However, as these groups become less common, their ties to the yakuza become less apparent, as they begin recruiting from other marginalized groups, such as the Japanese burakumin or Zainichi ethnic Koreans.

== International influence and diffusion ==
Beginning in the 2010s, the aesthetics and culture of bōsōzoku and its derived movements (classic motorcycle associations or kyūshakai) began inspiring automotive culture enthusiasts outside Japan. The specialized magazine ChampRoad documented this expansion in its featured section "Kyushakai in the World" (旧車會・ザ・ワールド), covering the presence of this subculture in countries such as Australia, Taiwan, Thailand, Indonesia, New Zealand, and Spain.

=== Asia and Oceania ===
In Asian countries such as Taiwan and Thailand, proximity to the Japanese market facilitated the importation of mid-displacement classic motorcycles, which were customized with elements like rocket cowls, raised seats (sandan seat), and traditional attire (tokkōfuku). Meanwhile, in Indonesia, a notable hub for handcrafted parts and accessories emerged, specializing in the manual reproduction of cowls, tail fairings, and components inspired by original Japanese models.

In Oceania (Australia and New Zealand), local enthusiasts established groups focused on the aesthetic customization of Japanese motorcycles from the 1980s and 1990s.

=== Spain ===
In Spain, the adoption of the bōsōzoku style does not exist as a delinquent subculture or youth gang phenomenon, but rather as an aesthetic trend focused on vehicle customization within the Japanese domestic market (JDM) automotive culture.

Unlike in Japan or other countries, vehicle modification in Spain is strictly regulated by national vehicle modification laws and mandatory Inspección Técnica de Vehículos (ITV) inspections, making the technical approval of extreme features—such as oversized angled cowls or high-swept exhaust pipes—particularly challenging. Despite these regulatory barriers, in December 2024 motorcycle media reported the official approval and road-legalization of the country's first bōsōzoku-style motorcycle—a Kawasaki GPz400—built independently by a creator operating under the pseudonym "Tofu Fujiwara".

Subsequently, the builder has continued hand-crafting other 1980s Japanese vehicles and sharing the process on social media. Through these activities, direct cultural exchange and ties were established with the Japanese kyūshakai scene, notably with the Tokyo-based club Shingashi (新河岸 / Tokyo Racing Team), a prominent benchmark in motorcycle tuning and repair as well as engine-revving techniques (bōsōzoku call / onshokunin). This Spanish representation was featured in a dedicated article by ChampRoad magazine.

== See also ==
- Mat Rempit
- Ah Beng
- Mod, a youth movement in the United Kingdom, associated with customised scooters
- Outlaw motorcycle club
- Raggare
- Tafheet
- Sukeban
- Akira
- Bari Bari Densetsu
- Tokyo Revengers
- Great Teacher Onizuka
- Shonan Bakusozoku
- God Speed You! Black Emperor
