= God Speed You! Black Emperor =

- DVD cover
- Directed by: Mitsuo Yanagimachi
- Produced by: Mitsuo Yanagimachi
- Cinematography: Taro Akashi; Katsutoshi Iwanaga; Makoto Sugiura; Kimio Tsukamoto; Yoshibumi Yokoyama
- Edited by: Tomoyo Ōshima; Eiko Yoshida
- Distributed by: Toei Company
- Release date: July 1, 1976 (Japan)
- Running time: 90 minutes
- Country: Japan
- Language: Japanese

God Speed You! Black Emperor (Japanese: ゴッド・スピード・ユー! Black Emperor, Hepburn: Goddo supiido yuu! Burakku emparaa) is a 1976 Japanese black-and-white 16 mm documentary film by director Mitsuo Yanagimachi that follows the exploits of young Japanese motorcyclists known as the "Black Emperors".

The 1970s in Japan saw the rise of a motorcycling movement called the bōsōzoku, which drew the interest of the media. The movie follows a member of the "Black Emperors" motorcycle club and his interaction with his parents after he gets in trouble with the police.

The Canadian post-rock band Godspeed You! Black Emperor named themselves after the film.
