= Ready to Shoot =

- DVD cover
- Directed by: Kōji Wakamatsu
- Starring: Yoshio Harada; Kaori Momoi; Keizō Kanie; Renji Ishibashi
- Production companies: Wakamatsu Productions; Shochiku
- Distributed by: Shochiku
- Release date: November 17, 1990 (Japan)
- Running time: 106 minutes
- Country: Japan
- Language: Japanese

Ready to Shoot (Japanese: われに撃つ用意あり, Hepburn: Ware ni Utsu Yōi Ari) is a 1990 Japanese film directed by Kōji Wakamatsu.

== Cast ==
- Yoshio Harada
- Kaori Momoi
- Shirley Lu
- Keizō Kanie
- Renji Ishibashi

== Reception ==
It was chosen as the 2nd Best Film at the 12th Yokohama Film Festival. Keizō Kanie also won the Award for Best Actor. Renji Ishibashi won the Award for Best Supporting Actor at the 14th Japan Academy Prize and Yoshio Harada was nominated for Best Actor.
