= Miyako Yamaguchi =

Japanese actress (born 1952)

- Born: February 3, 1952 (age 73); Osaka, Osaka, Japan
- Occupation: Actress
- Years active: 1977–present

Miyako Yamaguchi (山口美也子) (born February 3, 1952) is a Japanese actress. She won the award for best supporting actress at the 7th Hochi Film Award for Farewell to the Land.

== Filmography ==
- Onna no Hosomichi: Nureta Kaikyo (1980)
- Farewell to the Land (1982)
