= Keizō Kanie =

Japanese actor (1944–2014)

- Born: October 28, 1944; Edogawa, Tokyo, Japan
- Died: March 30, 2014 (aged 69); Shinjuku, Tokyo, Japan
- Other names: Keizou Kanie
- Occupation: Actor
- Years active: 1965–2014

Keizō Kanie (蟹江敬三, Kanie Keizō; October 28, 1944 – March 30, 2014) was a Japanese actor. He won the award for best supporting actor at the 1st Yokohama Film Festival for Angel Guts: Red Classroom and Jūkyūsai no Chizu and at the 12th Yokohama Film Festival for Ware ni utsu yoi ari and Boku to, bokura no natsu. He died on March 30, 2014, of stomach cancer at the age of 69.

== Filmography ==
=== Film ===
- Āa dōki no sakura (1967) - Second Sublieutenant Fawa
- Yasashii Nippon jin (1971)
- Kaoyaku (1971) - Sakamoto
- Asobi (1971)
- Arakajime ushinawareta koibitotchiyo (1971)
- Zatōichi goyō-tabi (1972)
- Goyōkiba (1972)
- Saihate no joji (1973) - Jirō
- Goyōkiba: Kamisori Hanzō jigoku zeme (1973)
- Goyōkiba: Oni no Hanzō yawahada koban (1974) - Mamushi
- Akasen tamanoi: Nukeraremasu (1974) - Shiwa
- Mutsugorō no kekkonki (1974)
- Okasu! (1976) - Truck Driver
- Utareru mae-ni ute! (1976) - Sone Genzo
- Kashin no irezumi: Ureta tsubo (1976) - Tattoo artist Tatsu
- Andō Noboru no waga tōbō to sex no kiroku (1976) - Kazuya Funabashi
- Brother and Sister (1976) - Kifuji
- Yokosuka otoko-gari: shoujo kairaku (1977) - Mickey Tokuda
- Onna kyōshi (1977) - Satoru Kobayashi
- Seibo Kannon daibosatsu (1977) - Man
- The Demon (1978) - Akutsu, Sōkichi's colleague
- Angel Guts: Red Classroom (1979) - Tetsuro Muraki
- Motto shinayaka ni, motto shitataka ni (1979)
- Jūkyūsai no Chizu (1979) - Konno
- Tenshi o yūwaku (1979)
- Warui yatsura (1980)
- Harukanaru sōro (1980) - Noboru Yamaguchi
- Furueru shita (1980) - Yamagishi
- Tosa No Ipponzuri (1980) - Katsu
- Muddy River (1981) - Policeman
- Yokohama BJ būrusu (1981)
- Enrai (1981) - Husband of kaede
- Farewell to the Land (1982) - Daijin
- Yaju-deka (1982) - Yakuza
- Fall Guy (1982) - Film Director
- Tantei monogatari (1983) - Detective Takamine
- Sukanpin walk (1984) - Ryusuke shiraki
- Yūgure zoku (1984) - Yasuhiko ōkubo
- Mattemashita tenkōsei! (1985)
- Nidaime wa Christian (1985) - Isomura
- Inujini sesi mono (1986) - Hitsuke
- Tabiji mura de ichiban no kubitsurinoki (1986)
- Koisuru Onnatachi (1986) - Teiko's father
- Sukeban Deka The Movie (1987) - Nishiwaki
- Sure Death 4: Revenge (1987) - Kyuzo
- Merodorama (1988)
- A Chaos of Flowers (1988) - Hogetsu Shimamura
- Yojo no jidai (1988)
- Bungakusho satsujin jiken: Oinaru jyoso (1989) - Kazuo Homata
- Zatoichi (1989)
- Boku to, bokura no natsu (1990)
- Rimeinzu: Utsukushiki yuusha-tachi (1990) - Handyman
- Ready to Shoot (1990) - Gunji
- Crest of Betrayal (1994) - Ichigaku Shimuzu
- Kura (1995) - Shin Hirayama
- Onihei hankachō (1995) - Kumehachi
- Takkyū onsen (1998)
- Ichigensan (2000) - Yakuza boss
- Drug (2001) - Yuji Takashina
- Nurse no oshigoto: The Movie (2002) - Detective Kumano
- Mana ni dakarete (2003) - Kai
- The Boat to Heaven (2003)
- Maze (2006)
- Sway (2006) - Osamu Hayakawa
- Tengoku wa matte kureru (2007)
- Zenzen daijobu (2008) - Eitaro
- The Little Maestro (2012) - Arasawa, Genji

=== Television ===
- Kaze to Kumo to Niji to (1976)
- Oretachi wa Tenshi da! (1979) Episode19
- Shadow Warriors III (1983) - Toramaro
- Haru no Hatō (1985) - Shūsui Kōtoku
- Sukeban Deka II: The Legend of the Girl In The Iron Mask (1985) - Nishiwaki
- Onihei Hankachō (1989) - Kumehachi
- The Abe Clan (1995) - Abe Gonbei
- Aoi Tokugawa Sandai (2000) - Fukushima Masanori
- Galileo (2008) - Yukimasa Tomonaga
- Ryōmaden (2010) - Yajiro Iwasaki
- Amachan (2013) - Chūbē Amano
