= Chūsei Sone =

Japanese film director

- Born: 1 October 1937; Gunma Prefecture
- Died: 26 August 2014 (aged 76); Usuki, Ōita
- Occupations: Film director Screenwriter
- Years active: 1967–2000

Chūsei Sone (曽根 中生, Sone Chūsei; 1 October 1937 – 26 August 2014) was a Japanese film director known for his stylish and popular Roman Porno films for Nikkatsu, particularly the first two installments of the Angel Guts series. Despite a somewhat uneven career, many mainstream critics consider Sone the best of Nikkatsu's Roman Porno directors.

== Life and career ==
Chūsei Sone majored in Art History at Tohoku University, and graduated in 1962. Soon after graduation, he began work as an Assistant director at Nikkatsu studios, where he worked with Seijun Suzuki. Suzuki's directing style was to have a lasting influence on Sone's own later work. In their Japanese Cinema Encyclopedia: The Sex Films, the Weissers compare Suzuki and Sone, writing, "Sone's films are riddled with quirky characters and surrealistic metaphors, but unlike the works of Suzuki, these movies are much more linear, plot driven, and ultimately crowd pleasing."

When Nikkatsu started their Roman Porno series of mainstream theatrical softcore pornographic films in November 1971, Sone was quickly given his chance to direct. His first film was the historical sex-film, Eros Schedule Book: Female Artist (1971). He directed several more films set in historical time periods such as Erotic Story: The Peony Lantern (1972), which became a mainstream hit and won several film industry awards. Later in 1972, Sone switched to contemporary themes with Lusty Sisters, but would return to the period-piece with his popular action-sex film starring Nikkatsu queen Junko Miyashita, Female Ninja Magic: 100 Trampled Flowers (1974).

By the late 1970s, Sone had become associated with a more violent style of eroticism in such films as My Sex Report: Climax Point (1976) and Shinjuku Mixed-Up Street: Wait Till I Come (1977). When Nikkatsu decided to film Takashi Ishii's Angel Guts manga, Sone was a logical choice to helm the first two episodes of the series, Angel Guts: High School Coed (1978) and Angel Guts: Red Classroom (1979). Sone was given a Best Director award at the Yokohama Film Festival for Angel Guts: Red Classroom, and the film also won Best Actress and Best Supporting Actor at the ceremony. Director Toshiharu Ikeda, who worked as Sone's screenwriter and an assistant director on Angel Guts: High School Coed, said, of Sone, "He is simply a genius. He really is a true genius... We were all tremendously influenced by him." Of the Angel Guts series, Ikeda comments, "That series definitely had an impact on Roman Porno history, as well as on the audience."

Throughout his career Sone directed many films of lesser quality, such as Overly Ripe Breasts (1973), Modern Prostitution: Lust Under A Uniform (1974) and 100 High School Girls: Secret Motel Report (1975). Nevertheless, his ability to continue to create stylish, innovative and popular films kept his reputation high.

By this point, Eiga Geijutsu magazine reported that Sone was dissatisfied with his work in the Roman Porno genre, and wanted to make other films, but that he needed the income these Nikkatsu films provided. Nikkatsu gave Sone the chance to direct the non-Roman Porno series of light comedies, Glory Cheerleaders (1976–1977), which became popular hits. While continuing to direct for Nikkatsu at this time, Sone worked for independent studios where he could enjoy more creative freedom, and not be tied to the pink film format. Hakata Kids' Innocence (1977), a simple story of one day in the lives of three junior high boys, is one such film. Following the success of Red Violation (1980), Sone took a full break from pink films for three years to try other projects. He returned to the genre with the successful sex-mystery, Demon's Room (1982). Together with director Mamoru Watanabe, Sone started the Film Workers Production Company in 1982 as an outlet for more mainstream projects.

After Tattoo (1984), based on a Tanizaki novel, Sone left Nikkatsu until 1986, when the studio gave him a relatively large budget to direct Adultery. Today judged one of his best works, the film was ignored by audiences and critics at the time because of the inferior quality of many films in the Roman Porno series of the mid-1980s. Sone directed a mainstream hit, Flying, in (1988) and then retired from directing.

He died on 26 August 2014 in Usuki, Ōita, from pneumonia.

== Filmography ==
- Branded to Kill (殺しの烙印, Koroshi no Rakuin) - writer (dir. Seijun Suzuki) (1967-06-15)
- The Blind Woman's Curse/The Haunted Life of a Dragon: Tattooed Lass, Tattooed Swordswoman (怪談昇り竜, Kaidan Nobori Ryu) - writer (dir: Teruo Ishii) (1970-06-20)
- Eros Schedule Book: Female Artist (色暦女浮世絵師, Irogoyomi Onna Ukiyoe-shi) (1971-12-18)
- Love Bandit Rat Man a.k.a. Love Bandit Nezumi Kozo (性盗ねずみ小僧, Seitou Nezumi Kozo) (1972-01-29)
- Foreigner's Mistress Oman: Holland Slope In The Rain (らしゃめんお万 雨のオランダ坂, Rashamen Oman: Ame No Oranda-zaka) (1972-03-18)
- Foreigner's Mistress Oman: Falling Autumn Flower (らしゃめんお万 彼岸花は散った, Rashamen Oman: Higanbana Wa Chitta) (1972-04-29)
- Erotic Story: The Peony Lantern a.k.a. Erotic Bride From Hell a.k.a. Hellish Love (性談牡丹燈籠, Seidan: Botandoro) (1972-06-28)
- Secret Chronicle: Prostitution Market ((秘)女郎市場, Maruhi: Joro Ichiba) (1972-09-16)
- Lusty Sisters (色情姉妹, Shikijō Shimai) (1972-11-29)
- Overly-Ripe Breasts: Married Women (熟れすぎた乳房 人妻, Uresugita Chibusa: Hitozuma) (1973-02-03)
- Naked Resume: True Story Of Kazuko Shirakawa (実録白川和子 裸の履歴書, Jitsuroku Shirakawa Kazuko: Hadaka No Rirekisho) (1973-02-21)
- Delinquent Girl: Alleycat In Heat (不良少女 野良猫の性春, Furyo Shoujo: Noraneko No Seishun) (1973-05-31)
- Showa Woman: Naked Rashomon (昭和おんなみち 裸性門, Showa Onnamichi: Rashomon) (1973-07-04)
- Secret Chronicle: Crimson Goddess In Paradise ((秘)極楽紅弁天, Maruhi: Gokuraku Aka-benten) (1973-08-25)
- Sigh (ためいき, Tameiki) (1973-11-20)
- Professional Sex Performers: A Docu-Drama (実録エロ事師たち, Jitsuroku Erogotoshitachi) (1974-01-26)
- Sigh 2 (続ためいき, Zoku Tameiki) (1974-02-16)
- Female Ninja Magic: 100 Trampled Flowers (くノ一淫法 百花卍がらみ, Kunoichi Ninpo: Hyakka Manji-garimi) (1974-08-03)
- Modern Prostitution: Lust Under A Uniform (現代娼婦考 制服の下のうずき, Gendai Shofu-ko: Seifuku No Shita No Uzuki) (1974-08-28)
- Love Doll Report: An Adult Toy (大人のオモチャ ダッチワイフ・レポート, Otona No Omocha: Dacchi Waifu Report) (1975-04-12)
- Lesbian World: Fondling (続・レスビアンの世界 －愛撫－, Zoku Lesbian No Sekai: Aibu) (1975-06-04)
- 100 High School Girls: Secret Motel Report (女高生100人 (秘)モーテル白書, Jokosei 100-nin: Maruhi Motel Hakusho) (1975-08-23)
- Hostess Confidential: Three Juicy Sisters (ホステス情報 潮ふき三姉妹, Hostess Joho: Shiofuki Sanshimai) (1975-10-18)
- My Sex Report: Intensities (わたしのSEX白書 絶頂度, Watashi No Sex-hakusho) (1976-02-21)
- Lewd Widow (淫絶未亡人, Inzesu Mibojin) (1976-05-15)
- 嗚呼！！花の応援団 Ah!! Hana no Oh-endan (1976-08-21)
- 嗚呼！！花の応援団 役者やのォー Ahh!! Hana no Oh-endan: Yakusha ya Noh (1976-12-25
- 不連続殺人事件 Furenzoku Satsujin Jiken (Arts Theatre Guild) - also writer (1977-03-15)
- 嗚呼！！花の応援団 男涙の親衛隊 Ah!! Hana no Oh-endan: Otoko Namida no Shineitai (1977-03-19)
- 新宿乱れ街 いくまで待って Shinjuku Midaregai: Ikumade Matte (1977-09-17)
- Sex Horoscope: Love Tasting (性愛占星術 SEX味くらべ, Seiai Senseijutsu: Sex Ajikurabe) (1978-02-04)
- Teacher Deer (教師 女鹿, Kyoshi Mejika) (1978-03-18)
- Angel Guts: High School Coed (女高生 天使のはらわた, Jokousei Tenshi No Harawata) (1978-07-22)
- 博多っ子純情 Hakatakko Junjo (LAL company) (1978-12-02)
- Angel Guts: Red Classroom (天使のはらわた 赤い教室, Tenshi No Harawata Akai Kyoshitsu) (also writer) (1979-01-06)
- Supergun Lady Wani Bunsho (スーパーGUNレディ ワニ分署) 1979-08-18
- Red Violation (赤い暴行, Akai Boko) (1980-01-05)
- 元祖大四畳半大物語 (co-directed with 松本零士) 1980-08-16
- Scars of the Sun (太陽のきずあと, Taiyo no Kizu Ato) 東映セントラルフィルム (Toei Central Film) (1981-02-14)
- Demon's Room (悪魔の部屋, Akuma no Heya) (1982-04-23)
- Blow the Night (夜をぶっとばせ, Yoru o buttobase) (1983)
- People Of Twilight (夕ぐれ族, Yugure-zoku) (1984-04-20)
- Tattoo (刺青 IREZUMI, Irezumi) (1984-12-22)
- Break Town Story (ブレイクタウン物語, Break Town Monogatari) - producer (K Enterprise) (dir. Masayuki Asao) (1985-08-24)
- Adultery (不倫, Furin) (1986-10-31)
- Flying (1988)
- Sigh (ためいき, Tameiki) (2000)

== Sources ==
- "Chusei Sone". 2005. in Angel Guts - The Nikkatsu Series - 5 Disc Collector's Edition ATU 017. Disc one: High School Co-ed. Biographies.
- "CHUSEI SONE". The Complete Index to World Film.
- Chusei Sone at IMDb
- Ikeda, Toshiharu. Jasper Sharp, interviewer. Sharon Hayashi, translator. 2005. An Insight into Chusei Sone in Angel Guts - The Nikkatsu Series - 5 Disc Collector's Edition. www.artsmagicdvd.com ATU 017. Disc one: High School Co-ed. Interviews.
- "曾根中生 (Sone Chusei)" (in Japanese). Japanese Movie Database.
