= Angel Guts =

Japanese film series

Angel Guts (Japanese: 天使のはらわた, Hepburn: Tenshi no Harawata) is a six-film series of pink films produced between 1978 and 1994. Nikkatsu oversaw production of the majority of the series. In accordance with the "pink film" genre, the prevalent theme in the series is sex, but violence is also featured prominently in the films. Angel Guts is based on the manga series written by Takashi Ishii, who also directed the fifth and sixth films in the series.

Angel Guts 5: Red Vertigo DVD Cover

In a public comment on the series, director Noboru Tanaka pointed out the various directorial styles exhibited in the films: "...all five versions are different. Mine is very energetic and it looks like you could burn yourself if you touch it, whilst the others are calmer and gentler. I think the audience shouldn't be bored by this series of films."

== Films ==
=== High School Co-Ed ===
Japanese: Angel Guts: High School Co-Ed (女高生 天使のはらわた, Jokousei Tenshi no Harawata) (1978, director: Chūsei Sone)

Kawashima, Kajima, and Sadakuni spend their days riding motorcycles and terrorizing/raping young girls. Kawashima is overly protective of his little sister, Megu, who does not know about her brother's terrible activities. While out with Megu, Kawashima comes upon Kajima and Sadakuni, who are going to rape a schoolgirl named Nami. Not wanting his sister to see what is happening, Kawashima stops them and tells Nami to head back home. This causes a rift among the friends and Kajima tells Kawashima that to make up for his transgression, he must rape Nami. Kawashima soon finds himself in a difficult position as his friends distance themselves from him and his sister is drawn into a bad situation.

=== Red Classroom ===
Japanese: Angel Guts: Red Classroom (天使のはらわた 赤い教室, Tenshi no Harawata: Akai Kyoshitsu) (1979, director: Chūsei Sone)

When Teruro, a writer for a porn magazine, watches a "rape" porn that is set in a school, he becomes obsessed with the lead actress, Nami, and tries to find her. He meets her by chance as he arrives for a shoot at a hotel, where she works behind the reception desk. She reluctantly agrees to discuss the possibility of working with him. When Nami takes Teruro to her room, she puts the moves on him, thinking he only wants her for sex. She confesses that she was actually raped in that film, and he tells her that he wants to help her. Despite this, he continues an abusive relationship with his girlfriend alongside his relationship with Nami.

=== Nami ===
Japanese: Angel Guts: Nami (天使のはらわた 名美, Tenshi no Harawata: Nami) (1979, director: Noboru Tanaka)

Whilst working for a women's magazine, writing articles about rape victims, Nami conducts an interview with a stripper and views a strange sex show. She leaves before the end, despite a weird man's insistence that she stay. The next day, Nami visits another rape victim and takes pictures until she meets the man from the sex club. He claims to work for a porno publisher. He cautions Nami on her growing obsession with rape stories. Nami continues to dig deeper in her research and soon starts having fantasies of rape as she comes closer to a fate that could be worse than death.

=== Red Porno ===
Japanese: Angel Guts: Red Porno (天使のはらわた 赤い淫画, Tenshi no Harawata: Akai Inga) (1981, director: Toshiharu Ikeda)

Nami works in a department store. She is asked to stand in for a friend in a magazine photo-shoot, which turns out to be for an S&M magazine called Red Porno. When the photos are published, she is sacked and her lover abandons her. Muraki, who is an unpopular otaku loner, tries to meet up with Nami, but is shot by a woman who takes him for a rapist and dies. This film is close to hard-core pornography.

=== Red Vertigo ===
Japanese: Angel Guts: Red Vertigo (天使のはらわた 赤い眩暈, Tenshi no Harawata: Akai Memai) (1988, director: Takashi Ishii)

In this film, Nami is a nurse and the unwilling object of her patients' lust. When she is hit by a car whilst fleeing from the home of her unfaithful boyfriend, the driver of the car takes her as a sexual prisoner.

=== Red Lightning ===
Japanese: Angel Guts: Red Lightning (天使のはらわた 赤い閃光, Tenshi no Harawata: Akai Senko) (1994, director: Takashi Ishii)

Nami is a photographer on the set of a porn film. When photographing a rape scene between a teacher and a schoolgirl, she becomes uncomfortable, having remembered a similar incident in her own past. Muraki, the editor, notices her discomfort and attempts to comfort her. However, he looks like Nami's attacker and she flees from him. She turns to her barmaid girlfriend for support, but finds out that she has been unfaithful, so Nami goes out to get drunk. When she wakes up the next morning with no memory of the night before, she is terrified to find the dead body of a man she takes to be her one-night stand. She runs into Muraki the next day and together they try to find out what happened.

== Availability ==
In 2005, the ArtsMagic company released a Region 1 five-DVD box-set containing the first five films in the series. The films were presented in anamorphic widescreen in Japanese with removable subtitles. The set also features commentaries on all films, original trailers, director interviews, and director and cast biographies.

== Sources ==
- Weisser, Thomas; Yuko Mihara Weisser (1998). Japanese Cinema Encyclopedia: The Sex Films. Miami: Vital Books : Asian Cult Cinema Publications. pp. 42–46. ISBN 1-889288-52-7.
- Thompson, Nathaniel (2006). DVD Delirium 3: The International Guide to Weird and Wonderful Films on DVD. U.K.: FAB Press. pp. 26–29. ISBN 1-903254-40-X.
