= The Man Who Stole the Sun =

1979 Japanese thriller film by Kazuhiko Hasegawa

- Film poster
- Directed by: Kazuhiko Hasegawa
- Screenplay by: Leonard Schrader; Kazuhiko Hasegawa
- Story by: Leonard Schrader
- Produced by: Mataichiro Yamamoto; Kei Ijichi
- Starring: Kenji Sawada; Bunta Sugawara
- Cinematography: Tatsuo Suzuki
- Edited by: Akira Suzuki
- Music by: Takayuki Inoue
- Production company: Kitty Films Corp.
- Distributed by: Toho
- Release date: 6 October 1979 (Japan)
- Running time: 147 minutes
- Country: Japan
- Language: Japanese

The Man Who Stole the Sun (Japanese: 太陽を盗んだ男, Hepburn: Taiyō o Nusunda Otoko) is a 1979 Japanese thriller film, directed by Kazuhiko Hasegawa.

== Plot ==
Makoto Kido, a high school science and chemistry teacher, has decided to build his own atomic bomb. Before stealing plutonium isotopes from Tōkai Nuclear Power Plant, he is involved in the botched hijack of one of his school's buses during a field trip. Along with a police detective, Yamashita, he is able to overcome the hijacker and is publicly hailed as a hero. He also gets close with a female radio personality nicknamed "Zero".

Meanwhile, Makoto is able to extract enough plutonium from his stolen isotopes to create two bombs. One is genuine, the other contains only enough radioactive material to be detectable, but is otherwise useless. He plants the second "bomb" in a public lavatory and phones the police. He demands that Yamashita take the case to investigate him. Since Makoto speaks to the police through a voice scrambler, Yamashita is unaware that Makoto is behind the whole thing.

Makoto next manages to extort the government into having baseball games broadcast in their entirety rather than stopping the coverage at 9pm (as per standard practice). Flush with success, Makoto follows a suggestion by Zero to use the real bomb to extort the government into allowing the Rolling Stones to play in Japan (despite a ban due to Keith Richards's arrest for narcotics possession). The request is soon granted and the band eventually is scheduled to play in Tokyo.

As Makoto makes his way to the concert with the bomb, Yamashita follows him. Makoto pulls out a gun and forces Yamashita to a rooftop. Makoto reveals that he was the extortionist and gets into a fight with Yamashita. Eventually, the two fall from the roof whilst Makoto holds on to the bomb. He is saved by grabbing onto a power line. Yamashita is not so lucky and falls to his death. Still in possession of the bomb, Makoto decides to leave. As he walks away, a ticking sound, then an explosion, is heard.

== Cast ==
- Kenji Sawada as Makoto Kido
- Bunta Sugawara as Inspector Masuo Yamashita
- Kimiko Ikegami as Reiko Sawai a.k.a. Zero
- Kazuo Kitamura as Tanaka
- Shigeru Kôyama as Nakayama
- Kei Satō as Dr. Ichikawa
- Yūnosuke Itō as Bus Hijacker

== Release ==
The Man Who Stole the Sun was released by Toho on October 6, 1979. The film's U.S. premiere was presented at Japan Society on October 10, 1980.

== Reception ==
On its release, the film won the Reader's Choice Award for Best Japanese Film in Kinema Junpo and Best Director, Reader's Choice Award at the (Mainichi Film Concours) and Best Supporting Actor for Bunta Sugawara at the Japanese Academy Awards.

In the Japanese film magazine July 2018 issue of Kinema Junpo a list was made of the Top 1970s Japanese Films voted by 115 people including film critics and directors with The Man Who Stole the Sun being voted at number one.

In 2022, American writer and critic Nick Newman placed The Man Who Stole the Sun on his Sight and Sound list of the greatest films ever made, saying, "In anything like a just world this is seen concurrent with benchmarks of Japanese cinema."
