= Kenji Nakagami =

Japanese writer (1946–1992)

- 中上 健次
- Nakagami in 1986
- Born: 2 August 1946; Shingū, Wakayama, Japan
- Died: 12 August 1992 (aged 46); Shingū, Wakayama, Japan
- Occupations: Novelist, short-story writer, essayist, critic
- Writing career
- Language: Japanese
- Notable works: The Cape (岬, Misaki); Withered Tree Straits (枯木灘, Karekinada); A Thousand Years of Pleasure (千年の愉楽, Sennen no yuraku)
- Notable awards: Akutagawa Prize (1976)

Kenji Nakagami (Japanese: 中上 健次, Nakagami Kenji; 2 August 1946 – 12 August 1992) was a Japanese writer, critic, and poet. He was one of the most prominent and influential Japanese writers of the post-war era, known for his novels, short stories, and essays that powerfully depicted the lives of Japan's burakumin outcaste community. Born into a buraku in Shingū, Wakayama, Nakagami was the first writer from this background to win the prestigious Akutagawa Prize, which he received in 1976 for his novella The Cape (岬, Misaki).

His writing is characterized by a rhythmic, visceral prose style that drew heavily on oral storytelling traditions, folklore, and the dialect of his native Kumano region. Nakagami's major works, including the "Akiyuki trilogy"—The Cape, Withered Tree Straits (枯木灘, Karekinada), and The Ends of the Earth, the Supreme Time (地の果て至上の時, Chi no hate, shijō no toki)—form a complex family saga set in the roji (路地, alleyways), a fictionalized version of his hometown's buraku. These narratives explore themes of bloodlines, incest, violence, sexuality, and the interplay between myth and history.

After publicly revealing his burakumin origins in 1977, Nakagami became a vocal public intellectual, engaging in critical dialogues about discrimination, Japanese literature, and national identity. He sought to represent the voices of the mukoku (voiceless), the socially silenced people of Japan. He consciously positioned his work against the mainstream of modern Japanese literature, which he critiqued for its exclusion of marginalized voices and its adherence to what he called the "emperor's syntax". Adopting the concept of "parallax" to describe his dual perspective as both an insider to the buraku and an outsider to mainstream society, he sought to create a "strange new tongue" rooted in the peripheral experiences of his community. He died from kidney cancer at the age of 46.

== Life ==
=== Early life in Shingū (1946–1965) ===
Kenji Nakagami was born on 2 August 1946 in a buraku (an outcaste ghetto) in the provincial city of Shingū, Wakayama Prefecture. His birth was illegitimate; his mother, Nakaue Chisato, was a widow with four surviving children from her first marriage to Kinoshita Katsuichirō, who had died in 1944. Nakagami's biological father was Suzuki Tomezō, a man from a nearby buraku in Arima who had a brief liaison with Chisato after the war. Tomezō was described as a tough, extreme man who worked on the black market. Nakagami would not formally meet him until he was an adult.

Nakagami's early life was marked by poverty and a complex family structure. His mother was illiterate, as were most of his family members. In 1954, at the age of eight, he was separated from his older half-siblings when his mother took him to live with Nakaue Shichirō, a construction contractor who became his legal stepfather. Before the age of 13, Nakagami had used two different family names (Kinoshita and Nakaue), neither from his biological father. The family's move to the Noda district, outside the main buraku of Kasuga, and Shichirō's growing prosperity provided Nakagami with financial stability and a better education than his siblings had received. He was the only one of the children to complete a secondary education, benefiting from post-war government incentives designed to keep buraku children in school. Nakagami later described himself as "the first child born from the encounter of Burakumin and letters."

Despite improvements after World War II, discrimination against burakumin in Shingū persisted, though it was less overt than in the pre-war era. The buraku itself, a network of narrow alleyways known as the roji, was a tight-knit community with its own distinct social norms and language. Nakagami's family life was also tumultuous. His older half-brother, Ikuhei, who had never attended middle school and struggled with alcoholism, behaved erratically and was resentful of the family's new arrangement. In 1959, when Nakagami was 13, Ikuhei hanged himself. This suicide would become a central, recurring trauma in Nakagami's early poetry and fiction. Another violent family event, dubbed the "Ohama Incident," in which one of his brothers-in-law fatally stabbed another, also appeared in his later work.

Nakagami began writing poetry and compositions in middle school, encouraged by a teacher, Yamamoto Ai. Even at this age, his writing stirred controversy for its challenging themes; a classmate, Tamura Satoko, later recalled that a story he wrote was deemed too provocative for a school contest because its last line was "The end justifies the means." His literary influences in high school included Ōe Kenzaburō, Ishihara Shintarō, and Etō Jun, and he avidly read the poetry of Arthur Rimbaud, whose work inspired him to write poetry.

=== Career in Tokyo and literary rise (1965–1977) ===
In February 1965, Nakagami left Shingū for Tokyo with a friend, missing his high school graduation. Receiving a generous allowance from home under the pretense of studying for university entrance exams, he instead immersed himself in the city's counterculture. He discovered jazz, particularly the free jazz of John Coltrane and Albert Ayler, which he later described as "destruction and creation," a force that "smashed everything" about his past, including the classical music he had once loved as an escape. This period was formative, with Tokyo and jazz becoming synonymous with freedom from his provincial home. From November 1967, he participated in the violent New Left protests known as gebaruto, driven by opposition to the Vietnam War and the renewal of the Anpo treaty. However, he soon grew critical of the movement's elite student activists and later found more affinity with the transgressive actions of the serial killer Norio Nagayama than with the movement's "revolutionist sentimentalism".

While working odd jobs, including as a baggage handler at Haneda Airport, he continued to write poetry and fiction. In 1966, he joined the dōjin zasshi (literary circle) Bungei shuto, where he quickly rose from member to editor. Through the circle, he met Yamaguchi Kasumi (pen name Kiwa Kyō), an educated writer from a business family, whom he married in 1970. They had three children: Nori (b. 1971), Naho (b. 1973), and Suzushi (b. 1978). During this time, Nakagami became a fixture in the Tokyo bundan (literary world), known for his heavy drinking, logical debating style, and frequent brawls.

Nakagami's early fiction, published in the late 1960s and early 1970s, focused on alienated young men, often on the fringes of society. Stories set in Tokyo, like Map of a Nineteen-Year-Old (十九歳の地図, Jūkyūsai no chizu, 1973), depicted sociopathic protagonists filled with a mixture of bravado and nihilism. Stories set in Shingū, such as The First Thing That Happened (一番はじめの出来事, Ichiban hajime no dekigoto, 1969), explored themes of buried identity, often using a nearby Korean hamlet as a proxy for the buraku.

Nakagami's major breakthrough came in 1976 when he was awarded the 74th Akutagawa Prize for his novella The Cape (岬, Misaki), the story of Akiyuki, a young laborer from an outcaste community dealing with a complex and violent family history. He was the first Akutagawa Prize winner born after World War II. The award was contentious; the judging committee debated the work's dense character relationships and its challenging prose. Nonetheless, the prize brought him mainstream critical success. The following year, he published Withered Tree Straits (枯木灘, Karekinada), a full-length novel continuing the story of Akiyuki, which was widely praised, with the influential critic Etō Jun hailing it as the fulfillment of Japanese naturalism's promise.

=== Public intellectual and later years (1977–1992) ===
In a March 1977 round-table discussion published in Asahi Journal with the senior writers Noma Hiroshi and Yasuoka Shōtarō, Nakagami made the landmark decision to publicly declare his buraku origins. This act was a turning point in modern Japanese literary history. To navigate the "double bind" of being pigeonholed as a "buraku writer", he initially spoke indirectly through the persona of "a writer whom I know", a technique Anne McKnight calls "effaced legibility". Nakagami maintained a complex and often critical stance toward organized buraku activism. He rejected the label of "minority writer," which he associated with weakness, and was frequently at odds with the Buraku Liberation League (BLL). Instead, he argued that discrimination was a structural issue embedded in the very fabric of Japanese culture and that the buraku represented a source of creative and subversive power.

Throughout the late 1970s and 1980s, Nakagami was a highly active public intellectual, collaborating closely with the critic Karatani Kōjin. Their dialogues, particularly their critique of the influential critic Kobayashi Hideo, helped shape the post-modern turn in Japanese literary criticism. Together, they developed a critical framework around the concept of the monogatari (tale) as an alternative to the modern realistic novel (shōsetsu). A key motivation for his literary project during this time was the physical destruction of his native Kasuga roji as part of urban renewal projects, which he viewed as a "tyrannical" erasure of social difference and the source of his narrative.

While based in Tokyo, Nakagami deepened his connection to his native Kumano region. In 1978, he co-founded the Buraku Youth Cultural Group and organized a series of lectures in a Shingū buraku neighbourhood, inviting prominent Tokyo writers, though the initiative ended in conflict with the local BLL. In 1990, he established "Kumano University" (熊野大学, Kumano Daigaku), a "school without walls" that sponsored annual symposia, concerts, and lectures in Shingū, drawing major intellectuals and artists from Tokyo. In 1986, he staged his play Kanakanuchi in an outdoor production at the original site of the Kumano Hongū Taisha shrine.

In his later years, Nakagami traveled extensively to Europe, the United States, Korea, and the Philippines, seeking an international audience for his work. In 1990, he gave a speech at the Frankfurt Book Fair titled "Am I Japanese?", where he presented a "parallax view" of Japanese literary history from his position between the oral world of his mother and the written world of literature. His later fiction moved away from the Akiyuki saga to explore the Tokyo underworld in works like Hymn (讃歌, Sanka, 1990) and Scorn (軽蔑, Keibetsu, 1992).

In early 1992, Nakagami was diagnosed with kidney cancer. He returned to Shingū and died on 12 August 1992, at the age of 46. His public funeral in Tokyo drew nearly 800 people. In his eulogy, Karatani Kōjin said, "Nakagami has died and I have lost my sense of gravity."

== Writing ==
Nakagami's work is notable for its exploration of buraku identity and its critical engagement with the forms and institutions of modern Japanese literature. Critic Anne McKnight argues that Nakagami's writing is structured by "parallax"—a dual perspective that views the world simultaneously through the lenses of mainstream Japanese society and the marginalized buraku community. This position allowed him to conduct a form of literary ethnography, or "writing of ethnicity," that challenged the myth of a monocultural Japan.

=== Style and language ===
Nakagami's prose is known for its rhythmic, kinetic quality and its grounding in the oral traditions of his native Kumano. He consciously sought to create a "strange new tongue" that could challenge what he called the "emperor's syntax"—the homogenized, standard written Japanese that dominated modern literature and, in his view, excluded marginalized experiences. To this end, he incorporated the sounds and cadences of the Shingū dialect, folk songs (like the Kyōdai shinjū song about brother-sister incest in Karekinada), and popular oral forms like sekkyō-bushi (sermon-ballads).

He experimented extensively with narrative voice. In contrast to the "single-consciousness narration" typical of the Japanese I-novel, Nakagami often employed a polyphonic, communal voice. In stories such as Nokori no hana ("Late Blossoms"), the narrative is voiced by a collective of "old women of the roji," an anonymous chorus that provides commentary and embodies the community's memory. This technique fractures the traditional subjective viewpoint and introduces a sense of shared, often contradictory, experience.

In his monogatari phase of the 1980s, particularly in A Thousand Years of Pleasure, his sentences became long, incantatory, and less bound by conventional grammar, reflecting the voice of the myth-telling narrator Oryū no Oba. The critic Iguchi Tokio described this style as composed of "chaotic sentences" that corrupt straightforward prose.

=== Major themes ===
==== The buraku and the roji ====
Nakagami's work is inextricably linked to his experience growing up in the Shingū buraku. His fiction is set in a semi-fictionalized version of this community, which he called the roji (路地, alleyway). For Nakagami, the roji was not simply a site of poverty and discrimination but a dense, mythical space, a "womb" that nourished his fiction with its unique language, legends, and social structures. He depicted it as a world overflowing with strong smells, vivid sights, and a raw, libidinous energy that stood in opposition to the sanitized norms of mainstream Japanese society. Unlike earlier writers who had addressed the "buraku problem," such as Shimazaki Tōson, Nakagami refused to portray the community through a lens of humanism or victimhood, instead exploring its "darkness" as a source of subversive power and mythic origins. He never used the word buraku in his fiction, referring to the community only through the neologism roji, thereby forcing readers to make the connection between the fictional space and its real-world referent.

==== Family, blood, and myth ====
At the heart of Nakagami's fiction is the saga of a single clan—the Nakaue family in the Akiyuki trilogy and the Nakamoto clan in A Thousand Years of Pleasure—scarred by a legacy of violence, poverty, and complex bloodlines. He repeatedly subverted the Oedipal father-son conflict that was a staple of modern Japanese literature (particularly the I-novel). In the Akiyuki saga, the protagonist's struggle is not primarily with his powerful, absent father, Hamamura Ryūzō, but with the tangled heritage of his mother's line, embodied by his mad half-sister Mie and his suicidal half-brother Ikuo.

The theme of incest is central, representing a dangerous but potentially creative transgression. Nakagami distinguishes between incest along the paternal line (as with Akiyuki and his half-sister Satoko), which is depicted as a path to self-creation and liberation, and incest along the maternal line (Akiyuki's unspoken desire for Mie), which represents a regressive, fatalistic pull toward a shared past and dissolution of the self. Scholar Machiko Ishikawa, drawing on the work of Eve Kosofsky Sedgwick, interprets the incestuous acts in the Akiyuki trilogy as part of a homosocial triangle where the female character (Satoko) becomes a medium for the male protagonist (Akiyuki) to confirm and enhance his bond with his father (Ryūzō). This "tyranny of the blood" is a key preoccupation, portraying identity not as a matter of individual will but as an inescapable inheritance.

==== Violence, sexuality, and silenced voices ====
Violence is a pervasive element in Nakagami's work, often erupting in shocking, visceral spectacles linked to sexuality. Critic Karatani Kōjin famously interpreted this violence not as mere brutality but as a form of "affirmation"—an embrace of the "here and now" that dissolves conventional moral categories and rigid social structures. While his depiction of violence against women has drawn criticism for its masculinist perspective, some scholars, such as Machiko Ishikawa, argue that these narratives paradoxically give voice to the mukoku (silenced), particularly the "sexed subaltern" woman whose experiences are otherwise unrepresentable.

Much of this violence is directed at or mediated through powerful female characters who often take the form of the snake woman or the miko (shaman). In stories like Ja'in ("Snake Lust"), Ukijima, and Fushi ("The Immortal"), male protagonists engage in erotic and violent encounters with mysterious, often divine or demonic women. These women are storytellers and keepers of memory who challenge the protagonist's sense of self and control. While Nakagami stated his intention was to reverse the traditional trope of the passive male victim of the snake woman, his male characters are often left broken, defeated, and overwhelmed by these encounters, suggesting an ambivalence about masculine agency in the face of a powerful, mythic femininity.

==== The South and the critique of modernity ====
Nakagami developed a critical concept of "the South" as a peripheral space of resistance against the modern, centralized "North." He was profoundly influenced by William Faulkner, seeing a parallel between the American South's experience as a "defeated nation" after the Civil War and his own native Kumano's position as a marginalized region within Japan, explicitly linking this idea of a national South to the state violence directed at buraku residents. In his later career, this concept expanded to a global scale, as he explored solidarity with other "Southern" regions, particularly Korea, which he saw as a vibrant, "animated" space that had retained the cultural and historical dynamism Japan had lost to modernization.

==== Poetry and the "expendable male" ====
Although he is primarily known as a prose writer, Nakagami began his career as a poet and stopped writing poetry only around 1969. His poetry, heavily influenced by Arthur Rimbaud, is raw and abstract, serving as a direct conduit for the traumas of his youth. A central theme is the "expendable male," the figure of a young man who dies young, often by drowning. This figure, who appears in various forms such as "Icarus," "brother," or "me," is a recurring elegy for his half-brother Ikuhei. The poetry explores a liminal space of desire and death, often associated with water, that prefigures the major themes of his later fiction. Eve Zimmerman suggests that Nakagami turned to fiction because poetry proved "too raw and direct a medium," and prose offered a "safer distance" from which to revisit his traumas.

== Legacy ==
Kenji Nakagami holds a unique and undisputed place in modern Japanese literature. His public declaration of his buraku identity broke a long-standing taboo in the literary world and opened a new path for discussions of discrimination and marginality in Japan. The writer Shimada Masahiko described him as Japan's "last author" (最後の作家, saigo no sakka), referring to his serious engagement with the political and social weight of literature.

Following his death, a "Nakagami boom" among critics and scholars helped to canonize his work. His legacy is preserved not only in his writings but also through the activities of Kumano Daigaku, which continues to hold annual events in his honor in Shingū. His life and work were the subject of the 2001 documentary film Roji e: Nakagami Kenji no nokoshita firumu ("To the Alleyway: The Film Kenji Nakagami Left Behind"), directed by Shinji Aoyama. The film incorporates 16mm footage that Nakagami himself shot in 1978, documenting the Shingū roji just before it was demolished for urban renewal. More recently, a renewed interest in his work since the 2010s has seen a number of stage and film adaptations of novels such as Wings of the Sun and A Thousand Years of Pleasure, with a notable shift in focus from his male protagonists to the female characters. In 2015, his daughter, Nori Nakagami, discovered a box of audiotapes of interviews her father had conducted with elderly burakumin women, which formed the basis for a 2016 NHK documentary.

His influence is particularly felt among younger generations of writers and readers who are drawn to his "fresh" and "intriguing" style, which stands in contrast to the literature taught in schools. Writers like Mōbu Norio, winner of the 2004 Akutagawa Prize, have cited Nakagami's modeling of how to be a writer without a university degree and how to draw on personal and local material. The enduring interest in his handwritten manuscripts, samples of which are featured on the covers of his collected works, attests to the perceived connection in his work between the physical act of writing and the visceral power of his stories. In the 2000s, critics associated with subculture studies, such as Ōtsuka Eiji and Azuma Hiroki, have revived interest in Nakagami's less-canonized genre fiction and manga, reinterpreting his narrative structures (monogatari) as precursors to the "story worlds" of contemporary popular media.

== Selected works ==
- The First Thing That Happened (一番はじめの出来事, Ichiban hajime no dekigoto, 1969)
- Map of a Nineteen-Year-Old (十九歳の地図, Jūkyūsai no chizu, 1974)
- The "Akiyuki" trilogy (1976–1983): This series of novels follows the life of Akiyuki, a young laborer from the roji, and is considered Nakagami's most significant achievement in realistic fiction.
  - The Cape (岬, Misaki, 1976): This novella introduces Akiyuki and his convoluted family, focusing on his first sexual encounter, an incestuous act with his paternal half-sister that he sees as a way to connect with his absent father. It won the Akutagawa Prize.
  - Withered Tree Straits (枯木灘, Karekinada, 1977): A full-length novel that continues Akiyuki's story. It culminates in a violent confrontation where Akiyuki murders his legitimate half-brother, Hideo. The novel delves deeper into the mythic history of the roji and the legend of the clan's ancestor, the warrior Magoichi.
  - The Ends of the Earth, the Supreme Time (地の果て至上の時, Chi no hate, shijō no toki, 1983): The final and most complex novel in the trilogy. It depicts the physical destruction of the roji by developers and the spiritual disintegration of Akiyuki, who is ultimately erased along with his world. The narrative climaxes with the suicide of his father, Ryūzō.
- Ja'in ("Snake Lust") (蛇淫, 1976)
- Kumano Stories (熊野集, Kumano-shū, 1978)
- The Woman of the Water (水の女, Mizu no onna, 1979)
- A Thousand Years of Pleasure (千年の愉楽, Sennen no yuraku, 1982): A collection of interconnected tales that marks a decisive shift away from realism toward a mythic, monogatari style. Narrated by the old midwife Oryū no Oba, it tells the stories of six exceptionally beautiful young men from the Nakamoto clan, all of whom are fated to die violently before the age of 30. The work explores themes of blood, fate, and the cyclical nature of time in the alleyway.
- Wings of the Sun (日輪の翼, Nichirin no tsubasa, 1984)
- Kishū: Land of Trees, Land of Roots (紀州 木の国・根の国物語, Kishū: Ki no kuni, ne no kuni monogatari, 1986)
- City of Gravity (重力の都, Jūryoku no miyako, 1988)
- Hymn (讃歌, Sanka, 1990)
- Different Tribes (異族, Izoku, 1984–1992, unfinished serial novel)
- Scorn (軽蔑, Keibetsu, 1992)
