= Ako (actress) =

Japanese actress

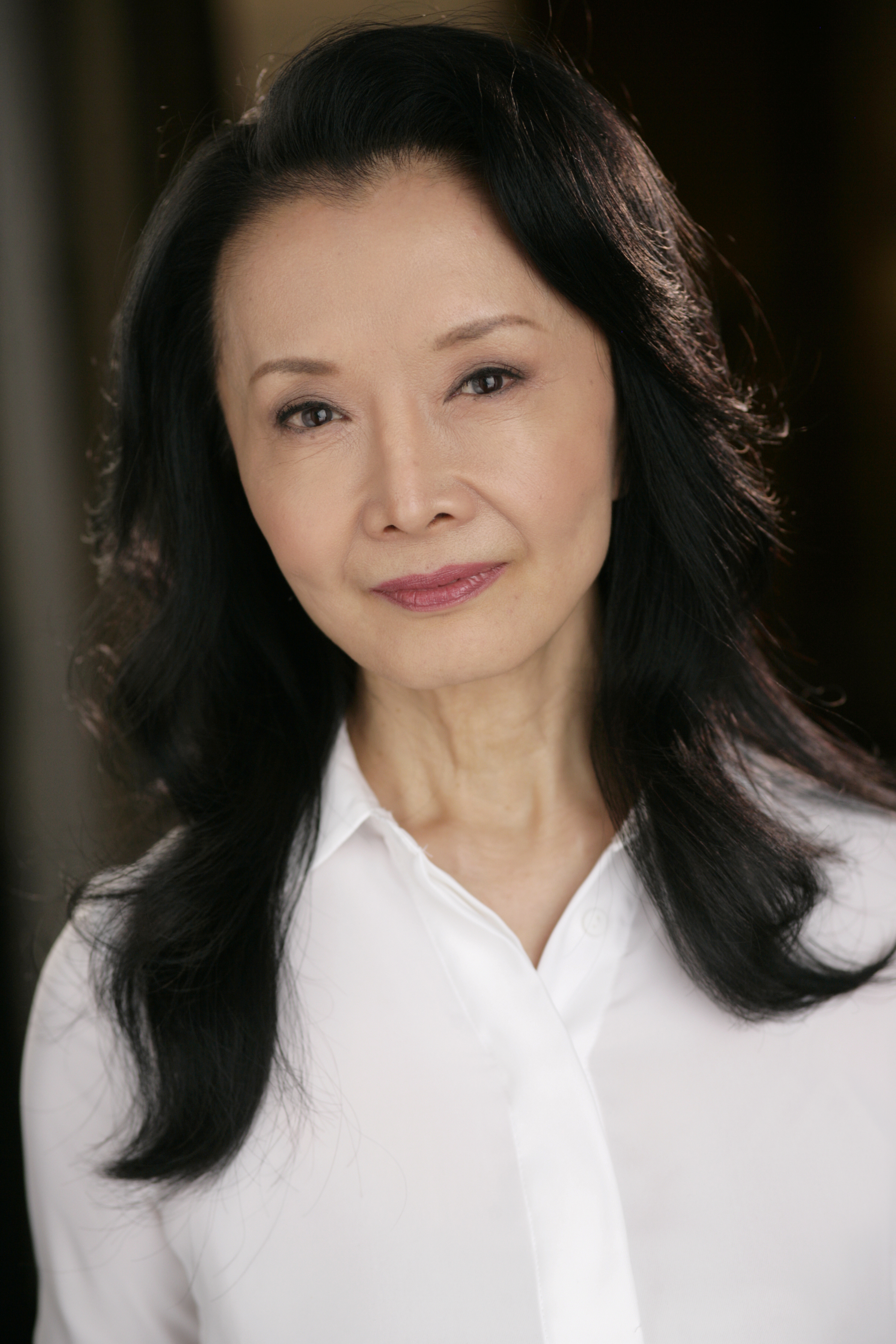
- Ako in 2019
- Born: Atsuko Taneya; Shibuya, Tokyo, Japan
- Other name: Ako Dachs
- Occupations: Actress, Producer, Director, Choreographer, Playwright
- Years active: 1960-present
- Spouse: Joshua Dachs
- Awards: Lucille Lortel Leading Actress in Play nomination, The best student Award and The excellent accomplishment award at Takarazuka Music School.

Atsuko Taneya, known professionally as Ako or Ako Dachs, is a Japanese actress who is the founding Artistic Director of the Amaterasu Za theatre company. She received a Lucille Lortel Award nomination for Outstanding Lead Actress in 2019.

== Early life and education ==
Ako was a child actress in Japan and she came to the United States to study at Lee Strasberg Theatre Institute.

Ako worked the Takarazuka Revue Company, all-female theater company in Japan.

== Acting career ==
=== Stage ===
Ako starred Off-Broadway in God Said This by Leah Nanako Winkler produced by Primary Stages at Cherry Lane Theatre and at Humana Festival. She also starred in Kentucky by Leah Nanako Winkler by Ensemble Studio Theatre.

Ako performed in repertory at the Oregon Shakespeare Festival in their 2010 and 2011 seasons. Notably, in Julius Caesar, Ako played Caius Ligarius as well as Soothsayer, speaking the nightmare scene in Japanese, from a 19th century translation. She played the Lady Macbeth character in Ping Chong's Throne of Blood, a stage adaptation of Kurosawa's film of the same name. She reprised the role later that year at Brooklyn Academy of Music and was lauded for moving "with a quiet grace, and her frequent use of stillness is equally potent."

Ako performed in the world premiere of Tamar of the River with Prospect Theater. She has worked with Papermill Play House in their production of Sayonara: The Musical, a stage version of the James A. Michener novel, Sayonara (1954) and Mikado Inc.

In 2020, Ako performed in Suicide Forest with Ma-Yi Theater Company. Play Anfisa in Moscow x6, by Williams Town Festival in 2018 and in2019 by MCC. In 2004, she performed as Chin/Suzuki in M. Butterfly at Arena Stage. She was in Pan Asian Repertory Theatre 2008 production of Shogun Macbeth, Tea House of the August Moon, and Sayonara: The Musical, She played Atsuko for Velina Hasu Huston's TEA at ATC at Seattle, Pittsburgh Public Theatre, and PanAsian Rep.

In 2022, she was in Molière's Dom Juan at Fisher Center at Bard. She directed and starred in Chushingura — 47 Ronin in New York, and the show received positive reviews. The play was in Japanese and English, both with subtitles, with Ako as narrator.

=== Film and television ===
Film credits include: These Birds Don't Fly South in the Winter (2019), I Origins (2014), Twelve (2010), No Reservations (2007), Shadowplay (short) (2002), Snow Falling on Cedars (1999), Too Tired to Die (1998), Daitoryo No Christmas Tree (1996), Prisoners in Time (1995), and Sleepwalk (1986).

Ako also appeared on an episode of 30 Rock in Season 3 (2008) and Mercy (TV series) (2010).

She appeared as Daiyoin/Lady Iyo in the 2024 FX series Shōgun.

== Directing, translation, and choreography ==
Ako adapted and translated three plays by Chikamatsu Monzaemon 'Courie of Love' and co-directed a staged reading, and she directed Yukio Mishima's Modern Noh Play 'Hanjo' and 'Aoi no Ue' in 2019.

Ako choreographed for productions of Sayonara: The Musical at Paper Mill Playhouse and Pan Asian Rep. She also choreographed for Shogun Macbeth and The Teahouse of the August Moon (play) at Pan Asian Rep.

== Awards ==
- 2019: Lucille Lortel Award for Outstanding Lead Actress in a Play - nominated
