= Beads from a Petal =

1972 film by Noboru Tanaka

- Theatrical poster for Beads from a Petal (1972)
- Directed by: Noboru Tanaka
- Written by: Keiji Kubota
- Starring: Rie Nakagawa; Keiko Maki
- Cinematography: Yoshihiro Yamazaki
- Music by: Hajime Kaburagi
- Distributed by: Nikkatsu
- Release date: February 9, 1972
- Running time: 71 min.
- Country: Japan
- Language: Japanese

Beads from a Petal (花弁のしずく, Kaben no shizuku) aka Drops on the Petal and Droplets from a Petal is a 1972 Japanese film in Nikkatsu's Roman porno series, directed by Noboru Tanaka and starring Rie Nakagawa and Keiko Maki.

== Synopsis ==
Yukie is a young woman who works at her father's flower shop. She uses her job to hide from her problems including a marriage troubled by her sexual frigidity. Her husband and her best friend engage in an affair, and Yukie goes to her father for advice on how to save her marriage.

== Cast ==
- Rie Nakagawa: Yukie Komaki
- Gen Mitamura: Haruhiko Komaki
- Keiko Maki: Kazuyo
- Kazuko Shirakawa: Akiko
- Ryūji Ōizumi: Tetsuya Kirimoto
- Keisuki Yukioka: Arashiyama Kitamura
- Hiroshi Chō: Dr. Yano
- Mitsuko Aoi: Yukie's mother
- Chieko Harada: Miho
- Chie Kanai: Takako
- Yachio Satō: Kaoru
- Yoshie Kitta: Reiko Itsuki

== Background ==
Beads from a Petal was actress Rie Nakagawa's Nikkatsu debut. For several years she had starred in independent pink films under the name Sakayu Nakagawa. When she joined Nikkatsu, the studio insisted that she change her stage name. Nakagawa would go on to star in several films for the studio, including the Office Lady Journal series, and Tatsumi Kumashiro's critically praised Lovers Are Wet.

The film also marked major Roman porno director, Noboru Tanaka's debut. The title was originally I'm Burning Up (Moeagaru watashi), which is the title Tanaka preferred. Tanaka's intent in the film was to allegorically portray Japanese society in the post-war years. In a 2005 interview, he said, "I thought the very atmosphere that surrounded us at the end of World War II, was similar to that enveloping a woman unable to feel anything when having sex. So I wanted to exemplify the situation we were facing after the war, by using the issue of a woman's frigidity. I wanted to think about the real meaning of Japan's restoration, following defeat in the war... After the war, Japan suffered from frigidity and the film described how the psychological bruises Japan suffered from would gradually be cured as time passed, through a young woman's life."

== Critical appraisal ==
Robert Firsching, writing for Allmovie, judges the film to be "disappointing" in comparison to some of Tanaka's other films made the same year, such as Woman on the Night Train. He concludes, "Tedious and formulaic, this is a film which, were it not for the sporadic sex scenes, would be the stuff of soap opera."

In their Japanese Cinema Encyclopedia: The Sex Films, the Weissers judge that despite the film's weaknesses, Tanaka's visuals and Nakagawa's performance make the film worthwhile. Director Tanaka would revisit the flower shop motif in Afternoon Affair: Transformation (1973), which the Weissers call a kind of "flip-side" of Beads from a Petal.

== Bibliography ==
=== English ===
- Kaben no shizuku (1972) at IMDb
- "KABEN NO SHIZUKU". Complete Index to World Film.
- Sharp, Jasper (2008). Behind the Pink Curtain: The Complete History of Japanese Sex Cinema. Guildford: FAB Press. pp. 134, 363. ISBN 978-1-903254-54-7.
- Weisser, Thomas; Yuko Mihara Weisser (1998). Japanese Cinema Encyclopedia: The Sex Films. Miami: Vital Books : Asian Cult Cinema Publications. ISBN 1-889288-52-7.

=== Japanese ===
- 花弁のしずく(1972) (in Japanese). allcinema.net.
- 花弁のしずく (in Japanese). Japanese Cinema Database (Agency for Cultural Affairs). Archived from the original on 2011-10-08.
- 花弁のしずく (in Japanese). Japanese Movie Database.
- 花弁のしずく(邦画) (in Japanese). Kinema Junpo. Archived from the original on 2011-10-07.
