= Watcher in the Attic =

- Theatrical poster for Watcher in the Attic (1976)
- Directed by: Noboru Tanaka
- Written by: Edogawa Rampo (story); Akio Ido (screenplay)
- Produced by: Yoshiteru Yūki
- Starring: Junko Miyashita
- Cinematography: Masaru Mori
- Edited by: Osamu Inoue
- Music by: Jirō Tateshina
- Distributed by: Nikkatsu
- Release date: June 12, 1976
- Running time: 76 minutes
- Country: Japan
- Language: Japanese

Watcher in the Attic (江戸川乱歩猟奇館 屋根裏の散歩者, Edogawa Rampo ryōkikan: yaneura no sanposha), also known as Stroller in the Attic, Edogawa Rampo Theater: Walker in the Attic, or Walker in the Attic, is a 1976 Japanese film in Nikkatsu's Roman porno series, directed by Noboru Tanaka and starring Junko Miyashita.

== Plot ==
In 1923 Tokyo Lady Minako is the owner of a shabby boarding house with a collection of bizarre characters for tenants. Gōda, one of her tenants, spends most of his time in the attic spying on the other tenants through holes he has drilled into the ceiling. During one of his peeping sessions, Gōda witnesses the murder of one of the tenants at the hand of Lady Minako. Gōda becomes obsessed with Lady Minako, and determines to commit a grotesque murder in order to prove to her that he is her soul mate. He kills another tenant - a priest - by dripping poison into his mouth through the ceiling. A series of grotesque murders follow. The film ends apocalyptically with the Great Kantō earthquake which kills both of them during their intercourse.

== Cast ==
- Junko Miyashita: Minako Kiyomiya
- Hiroshi Osa: Kōichirō Kiyomiya
- Renji Ishibashi: Gōda Saburō
- Tokuko Watanabe: Miyuki Tomita
- Kōji Yashiro: Endō
- Haruka Tajima: Ginko
- Toshihiko Oda: Hiruta
- Shirō Yumemura: Pierrot
- Reiko Akitsu: Model
- Aoi Nakajima: Prostitute
- Kyōichi Mizuki: Druggist

== Background ==
This film was the middle entry in director Tanaka's "Showa Era Trilogy", which includes A Woman Called Sada Abe (1975) and Beauty's Exotic Dance: Torture! (1977). All three films star Junko Miyashita. The story was based on a novel by the Japanese horror-mystery writer, Edogawa Rampo. It had been filmed as a pink film in 1970 by director Akitaka Kimata, and Akio Jissoji remade Watcher in the Attic in 1995 in one of the earliest un-fogged pink films. The uncensored version of Jissoji's film was released internationally, though the Japanese theatrical release of this film was fogged.

Lead actress Junko Miyashita had joined Nikkatsu with the third entry in the Apartment Wife series, Apartment Wife: Unforgettable Night (1972). She starred in several of Nikkatsu's Roman Porno(s) and became known as the second "Queen" of Roman Porno after the retirement of Kazuko Shirakawa. Besides Tanaka, she was associated with the films of Tatsumi Kumashiro.

Lead actor Renji Ishibashi had background in the live theater, and made a name for himself in Roman porno for psychologically unbalanced characters. Besides Watcher in the Attic, another of his major roles is in Tatsumi Kumashiro's Woman with Red Hair (1979), also starring Junko Miyashita. He later regularly appeared in old yakuza roles in the films of Takashi Miike and others.

== Themes and legacy ==
Jasper Sharp notes that director Tanaka portrays the Taishō period, in which the film is set, as "a pandemonium of styles and colours". Tanaka emphasizes the mixture of the erotic and the grotesque in Rampo's work, and in popular culture of the period, which led to its description as "ero guro". According to Sharp, Tanaka's vision of Rampo's world set the tone for later filmed versions of the author's works as well as biographical films. Tanaka's influence can reportedly be seen in Jissoji's 1994 remake of Walker in the Attic, Kazuyoshi Okuyama's The Mystery of Rampo (1994), Jissoji's The D-Slope Murder Case (1998), and in Rampo Noir (2005).

Voyeurism—already present in Rampo's story—is a major theme in the film. Tanaka makes the audience aware that Lady Minako is conscious of Gōda's--and, by extension the audience's--spying on her illicit sexual activities. Sharp writes that the camera views Minako through Gōda's ceiling peephole, "acknowledging the viewer's powerless and passive spectatorial role as she returns our gaze." Sharp also notes that voyeurism is a common theme in the pink film, and that it would be deeply explored in the later films of director Hisayasu Satō. Not only a psychological theme, voyeurism also provided a practical way for the director to obscure sexual organs, which were censored by law. Sharp writes, "Framing the sex scenes from an awkward nozoki point-of-view perspective, through keyholes, gaps in open doors, holes in walls, etc, proved one particularly expedient method of blocking the action."

== Critical Reception ==
Some critics had recognized Tanaka's talents in the early Roman Porno, Secret Chronicles: She Beast Market (1974), but it was Watcher in the Attic which brought him mainstream success. Peer Cinema Club Annual, a conservative, mainstream publication, wrote that the film was "a perfect marriage of decadence and art." At first treated as a standard entry of Nikkatsu's "Psycho Killer Showcase" series, after the film began receiving mainstream critical approval, Nikkatsu promoted Walker in the Attic beyond the softcore Roman Porno market.

English-language critical opinion of the film has been high in the decades since its first release. Magill's Survey of Cinema: Foreign Language Films (1985) calls Watcher in the Attic "a frenzied fantasy treat". In their Japanese Cinema Encyclopedia: The Sex Films (1998), the Weissers give the film three and a half out of four points. Jasper Sharp comments that the film shows Tanaka's versatility as a director.

In 2020, Sight & Sound magazine listed the film as the best Japanese film of 1976.

== Availability ==
Watcher in the Attic was released theatrically in Japan on June 12, 1976. It was released to home video in VHS format in Japan on September 9, 1994. As part of Geneon's second wave of Nikkatsu Roman porno series, it was released on DVD on December 22, 2005. On October 28, 2008, Mondo Macabro released Watcher in the Attic in the U.S. on region 0 DVD.

== Bibliography ==
=== English ===
- "EDOGAWA RAMPO RYOKI-KAN: YANEURA NO SANPO SHA". Complete Index to World Film.
- Sharp, Jasper (2008). Behind the Pink Curtain: The Complete History of Japanese Sex Cinema. Guildford: FAB Press. pp. 134–136. ISBN 978-1-903254-54-7.
- Weisser, Thomas; Yuko Mihara Weisser (1998). Japanese Cinema Encyclopedia: The Sex Films. Miami: Vital Books : Asian Cult Cinema Publications. ISBN 1-889288-52-7.

=== Japanese ===
- 江戸川乱歩猟奇館 屋根裏の散歩者(1976) (in Japanese). allcinema.net.
- 江戸川乱歩猟奇館 屋根裏の散歩者 (in Japanese). Japanese Cinema Database (Agency for Cultural Affairs).
- 江戸川乱歩猟奇館 屋根裏の散歩者 (in Japanese). Japanese Movie Database.
- 江戸川乱歩猟奇館 屋根裏の散歩者(邦画) (in Japanese). Kinema Junpo.
- 江戸川乱歩猟奇館・屋根裏の散歩者 (in Japanese). www.nikkatsu-romanporno.com.
