= Beauty's Exotic Dance: Torture! =

- Theatrical poster
- Directed by: Noboru Tanaka
- Written by: Akio Ido
- Starring: Junko Miyashita
- Cinematography: Masaru Mori
- Edited by: Shinji Yamada
- Music by: Jirō Takada
- Distributed by: Nikkatsu
- Release date: February 23, 1977
- Running time: 83 minutes
- Country: Japan
- Language: Japanese

Beauty's Exotic Dance: Torture! (発禁本「美人乱舞」より責める！, Hakkinbon Bijin Ranbu Yori: Semeru!) aka Torture! and From the Banned Book "Wild Dance of a Beautiful Woman": Torture! is a 1977 Japanese film in Nikkatsu's Roman porno series, directed by Noboru Tanaka and starring Junko Miyashita. Set during the Taishō period, it uses Nikkatsu's superior technical resources to create what Jasper Sharp calls a pink film-style "sumptuous festival of cruelty" portraying the artistic life of the photographer, writer and kinbakushi, Seiu Itō.

== Synopsis ==
The life of the S&M-theme artist and author Seiu Itō is depicted in the film. His artistic life and Sadian philosophy, inspired by his torturing of his two wives and Tae, his favorite prostitute, are portrayed as shown in his journalistic writings.

The film begins by introducing Tae, showing her as stuporous and unresponsive to Ito's tortures, with Ito being helped in his tortures of Tae by an elderly woman. Then, through a series of flashbacks, we see Ito submitting his wife to various tortures, including being submerged in an icy lake and being suspended upside down by rope while pregnant. During these tortures, he would use a team of photographers to capture the position and pain of his wife to then paint the photos.

Itō meets Tae in a brothel when he stays on past closing time, and intrigues Tae by telling a gruesome story of mutilating his wife when she left him, which he initially pretends to be a personal one. They begin their relationship, with Tae increasingly curious as to the tortures that he inflicted on his wife that drove her away, seemingly enjoying the challenge of being able to withstand the tortures herself.

As their relationship progresses, the tortures become more and more extreme, with Tae's resilience causing Itō to fall more and more in love with her. Eventually, Tae begins to act erratically. Itō visits a doctor and is told that Tae has congenital syphilis, and is thus going insane. At this time, Tae's mother, the elderly woman from the beginning of the film, finds Itō and Tae, and accuses Itō of driving her insane with his tortures. Realising that Tae's mother was the source of Tae's syphilis and likely similarly insane, he accepts the mother's suggestion that further torture may undo her insanity and accepts her help in torturing a mostly unresponsive Tae.

Eventually Tae dies, and she is carried away in a coffin by Itō and her mother. The film ends with Itō musing that he should have kept her corpse, as he would have been able to position it in ways not possible with his human subjects.

== Reception ==
Because of the film's more overtly sado-masochistic theme, Beauty's Exotic Dance: Torture! received less critical acclaim than the previous two entries in Tanaka's Showa trilogy-- A Woman Called Sada Abe (1975) and Watcher in the Attic (1976). However, in their Japanese Cinema Encyclopedia: The Sex Films, Thomas and Yuko Mihara Weisser give Beauty's Exotic Dance: Torture! a top-rating of four out of four stars. Noting Tanaka's use of "dark images, obsessive nihilistic philosophy, and gravely somber atmosphere", they write, "Like all of the movies from Tanaka's Mad Love period, it's filmed in matter-of-fact, non-flinching style, creating a dangerous ambivalence towards traditional concepts of right and wrong, sanity and insanity."

Allmovie calls the film "an amoral masterpiece" and one of "the most disturbing films ever released by the Nikkatsu studio". Writing that the dark and oppressive nature of the film works in its favor, the review concludes, "[t]he cumulative effect is quite powerful, and not for the faint of heart."

== Release ==
Beauty's Exotic Dance: Torture! was released theatrically in Japan on February 23, 1977.

=== Home media ===
It was released for home video in VHS format on January 12, 1996,. It was released on DVD on September 22, 2006 as part of Geneon's fifth wave of Nikkatsu Roman porno series.

== Bibliography ==
=== English ===
- "HAKKINBON BIJIN RANBU YORI: SEMERU!". Complete Index to World Film.
- Hakkinbon bijin ranbu yori: semeru! (1977) at IMDb
- Sharp, Jasper (2008). Behind the Pink Curtain: The Complete History of Japanese Sex Cinema. Guildford: FAB Press. pp. 134, 153, 363. ISBN 978-1-903254-54-7.
- Weisser, Thomas; Yuko Mihara Weisser (1998). Japanese Cinema Encyclopedia: The Sex Films. Miami: Vital Books : Asian Cult Cinema Publications. p. 61. ISBN 1-889288-52-7.

=== Japanese ===
- 発禁本「美人乱舞」より 責める！(1977) (in Japanese). allcinema.net.
- 発禁本「美人乱舞」より 責める！ (in Japanese). Japanese Cinema Database (Agency for Cultural Affairs).
- 発禁本「美人乱舞」より 責める！ (in Japanese). Japanese Movie Database.
- 発禁本「美人乱舞」より 責める！(邦画 ) (in Japanese). Kinema Junpo. Archived from the original on 2012-03-24.
- 発禁本「美人乱舞」より・責める！ (in Japanese). www.nikkatsu-romanporno.com. Archived from the original on 2010-01-28.
