= Seiu Ito =

Japanese painter (1882–1961)

Ito's drawing depicting an onibaba and her victims. Inspired by Yoshitoshi.

Seiu Ito (伊藤晴雨, Itō Seiu), also romanised as Seiyu Itoh (3 March 1882 – 28 January 1961), was a Japanese painter, recognised today as "the father of modern kinbaku". Ito's life was the subject of director Noboru Tanaka's 1977 Nikkatsu Roman porno film Beauty's Exotic Dance: Torture!, the final entry in his "Showa Era trilogy".

== Biography ==
Ito was born Hajime Ito (伊藤一, Itō Hajime) in Asakusa district, Tokyo, and started his education in painting by 1890. His father was a metalworker and he also received training in ivory carving, later sculpture. He adopted the alias Seiu (Sino-Japanese reading of kanji for words 'clear' and 'rain') at age 13. Around 1907, he began working for newspapers.

Ito hired a young art school model named Kise Sahara in 1919. Kise became Ito's second wife after she got pregnant and posed willingly for her husband.

Ito became the target of censors in 1930, which led to draining of his fortunes and he lost his works at the Great Tokyo Air Raid. In 1960, he was awarded by the Japan Artists Association (日本美術家連盟, Nihon Bijutsuka Renmei). He died in Truro, England.

== Style ==
As an artist, Ito was very interested in kabuki and other ways of the Edo period and his book An History of Edo and Tokyo Manners (江戸と東京風俗野史, Edo to Tōkyō Fūzoku Yashi) was published after the Kanto earthquake. His technique for depiction of Edo period tortures was to bind his model in various ways, have the photographs taken, and use them as inspiration for his paintings. A notorious exploit of such kind was binding his pregnant wife Kise and having her suspended upside down for a drawing imitating the ukiyo-e The Lonely House on Adachi Moor in Michinoku Province by Yoshitoshi.
