= Ichijo's Wet Lust =

1972 Japanese film by Tatsumi Kumashiro

- Theatrical poster
- Directed by: Tatsumi Kumashiro
- Written by: Tatsumi Kumashiro
- Starring: Sayuri Ichijō; Hiroko Isayama; Kazuko Shirakawa
- Cinematography: Shinsaku Himeda
- Edited by: Ko Suzuki
- Music by: Noboru Yoda
- Distributed by: Nikkatsu
- Release date: October 7, 1972
- Running time: 69 minutes
- Country: Japan
- Language: Japanese

Ichijo's Wet Lust (一条さゆり 濡れた欲情, Ichijō Sayuri: nureta yokujō) aka Ichijo's Wet Desire, Drenched Passion, Sayuri Ichijo: Moist Desire, Following Desire and Sayuri Ichijō: Wet Lust is a 1972 Japanese film in Nikkatsu's Roman porno series, directed by Tatsumi Kumashiro and starring the famous stripper Sayuri Ichijō as herself, and co-starring Kazuko Shirakawa and Hiroko Isayama. Considered one of the best films in the series, in 1999 Japanese critics voted it one of the 100 best Japanese films of the 20th century.

== Synopsis ==
Famous real-life stripper Sayuri Ichijō appears as herself in this fictional account of her daily life. The story involves Ichijō's relationships with two men: Her boyfriend, and the strip club owner. Ichijō considers her work in striptease to be an art-form and pushes the boundaries of legality. Harumi, a younger stripper determined to outdo Ichijō, contributes to the ever-increasing extremity of the strip acts, which result in continuous problems with the police, and numerous arrests.

== Cast ==
- Sayuri Ichijō as Herself
- Hiroko Isayama as Harumi
- Kazuko Shirakawa as Mari
- Go Awazu as Daikichi
- Akira Takahashi as Isamu
- Tamaki Komayama as Jirō
- Tetsusen Nakahira as a drunk
- Shōichi Ozawa as a ramen shop owner
- Moeko Ezawa as a police woman
- Kafusu Nakada as a barker
- Botan Nakada: Barker

== Style and themes ==
Ichijo's Wet Lust was director Tatsumi Kumashiro's second Roman Porno film. In depicting the life of a sex industry worker, the film fits into one of Kumashiro's recurring subjects, foreshadowed in his early, unsuccessful film Front Row Life (1968). Kumashiro's Wet Lust: Twenty One Strippers (1974) was an unofficial sequel to Ichijo's Wet Lust, and was even more successful than its predecessor. A later Kumashiro film with a real stripper playing herself in the title role is Madoka Mika: The Woman Who Wets Her Finger (1984).

Sayuri Ichijō had become notorious in 1970 for creating the tokudashi or "open stage" form of striptease. Ichijō involved the audience in her act by passing out a magnifying glass, with which selected members of the audience were allowed to perform a "genital inspection" on the dancer. Much of Ichijō's act is portrayed in the film, such as an elaborate strip routine in which she sheds a kimono with the use of a samurai sword. Other routines simulate lesbian masturbation, and show the stripper dripping hot wax on herself, and, afterward, soothing her skin with lemon. Because of the censorship of Japanese pornography, Ichijō's most famous routine—the "genital inspection"— could not be shown in the film. According to Film Quarterly, Kumashiro instead "conjures up the physicality of the vagina" in a scene in which Harumi, the stripping competitor, raises one leg and sprays milk onto the face of a mesmerized member of the audience.

Kumashiro's long battles against censorship are also part of the framework of the film. The women in the film are the objects of police attention, while the men who make a living off them and are entertained by them are left alone. Film Quarterly writes that Kumashiro portrays this situation, "without any hypocritical moralizing." Ichijō's troubles with the law are shown both in her arrests within the narrative of the film, and in a caption which informs the audience that Ichijō was under prosecution for obscenity during the filming. Film Quarterly notes that Ichijō's and Harumi's tokudashi performances, as presented in the film, can be seen by U.S. audiences as demeaning to women. It is pointed out that the actual Ichijō fought for the right to do these performances as a form of freedom of expression. In the context of the film, Harumi's final tokudashi performance, in which she ejaculates on the face of the audience member, is seen as a form of triumph.

== Reception ==
=== Box office ===
Ichijo's Wet Lust was a huge box-office hit on its first release. It was also popular with critics. The mainstream cinema journal Kinema Jumpo gave Tatsumi Kumashiro awards for Best Director and Best Screenplay for the year. Kinema Jumpo also gave Hiroko Isayama, who played Ichijō's young stripper rival, the award for Best Actress. Critics continue to hold the film in high esteem, and in 1999 Kinema Jumpo voted Ichijo's Wet Lust one of the 100 best Japanese films of the 20th century.

=== Critical response ===
Lead actress Sayuri Ichijō has been singled out for praise for her performance in this film. A contemporary Variety review wrote that Ichijō, "has grit, good-natured rebelliousness and a comic verve that raise the pic into a comedic drama that transcends its type and milieu for some regular as well as grind chances abroad..." Allmovie writes of lead actress Ichijō, "Her brilliant and humorous performance, and her dedication to stripping... lift this picture out of the mainstream." In their Japanese Cinema Encyclopedia: The Sex Films, the Weissers give the film three and a half out of four points, and write that Ichijō "delivers another delightful performance here, especially in the highly erotic striptease numbers which include generous portions of candle-wax S&M, bondage and perverse sexuality ...but no pubic hair."

== Home media ==
Ichijo's Wet Lust was released on home video in VHS format on December 12, 1988, and on DVD on July 27, 2001. It was re-released on DVD on December 22, 2006, as part of Geneon's sixth wave of Nikkatsu Roman porno series. On March 23, 2010, Kino International released three Tatsumi Kumashiro films on DVD in the U.S. Along with Twisted Path of Love (1972) and Yakuza Goddess: Lust and Honor (1973), they released Ichijo's Wet Lust under the title Sayuri Ichijo: Following Desire.
