= Sada Abe =

Japanese geisha, prostitute and murderer (1905–disappeared 1970)

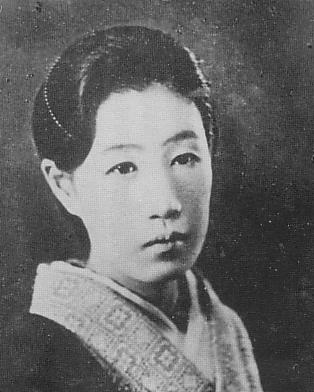
- Abe portrait, c. 1935
- Born: May 28, 1905; Kanda, Tokyo, Japan
- Disappeared: 1970 (aged 65–66)
- Occupations: Geisha; prostitute; maid; author; actress; waitress
- Criminal charges: Murder; Mutilation of a corpse
- Criminal penalty: 6 years imprisonment (commuted)
- Parents: Shigeyoshi Abe; Katsu Abe

Sada Abe (阿部 定, Abe Sada; born May 28, 1905; disappeared 1970) was a Japanese geisha and prostitute who murdered her lover, Kichizō Ishida (石田 吉蔵), via strangulation on May 18, 1936, before cutting off his penis and testicles and carrying them around with her in her kimono. The story became a national sensation in Japan, acquiring mythic overtones; it has also been interpreted by artists, philosophers, novelists and filmmakers. Abe was released after serving five years in prison and went on to write an autobiography.

== Family background ==
Sada Abe was the seventh of eight children of Shigeyoshi and Katsu Abe, an upper middle-class family of tatami mat makers in Tokyo's Kanda area. Only four of the Abe children survived to adulthood, of whom Sada was the youngest. Her father, originally from Chiba Prefecture, had been adopted into the Abe family to help with the business, which he eventually inherited. Aged 52 at the time of Sada's birth, he was described by police as "an honest and upright man" who had neither conspicuous vices nor any brushes with the law; some acquaintances reported him to be somewhat self-centered, with a taste for extravagance. Likewise, Sada's mother had no known legal or moral blemishes on her record.

Sada's brother Shintarō was known as a womanizer and, after his marriage, ran away with his parents' money. Her sister Teruko was also known to have had several lovers. Sada's father sent Teruko to work in a brothel, then not an uncommon way to punish female sexual promiscuity in Japan, although he soon bought her back. Teruko's past was not considered a hindrance to marriage for those of the Abes' class at the time, and she soon married.

== Early life ==
Abe was born on May 28, 1905. She was doted on by her mother, being the family's youngest surviving child, and was allowed to do as she wished. Abe was encouraged to take lessons in singing and in playing the shamisen, both activities which, at the time, were more closely associated with geisha – an occasionally low-class profession – and prostitutes than with classical artistic endeavor. Geisha were considered glamorous celebrities at the time, and Abe herself pursued this image by skipping school for her music lessons and wearing stylish make-up.

As family problems over her siblings Shintarō and Teruko became more pressing, Abe was often sent out of the house alone. She soon fell in with a group of similarly independent teenagers. At the age of 14, during one of her outings with this group, Abe was raped by one of her acquaintances, a Keio University student. Abe's parents initially appeared to support her but soon changed their response and, claiming that Abe had become irresponsible and uncontrollable, sold her to a geisha house in Yokohama in 1922. Abe's oldest sister, Toku, testified that she wished to become a geisha. Abe herself, however, claimed that her father made her a geisha as punishment for her promiscuity.

Abe's encounter with the geisha world proved to be a frustrating and disappointing one. To become a true star among geisha required apprenticeship from childhood, with years spent training and studying arts and music. Abe never progressed beyond a low rank, and one of her main duties was to provide sex for clients. She worked for five years in this capacity and eventually contracted syphilis. Since this meant she would be required to undergo regular physical examinations, just as a legally licensed prostitute would, Abe decided to enter a better-paying profession.

== Early 1930s ==
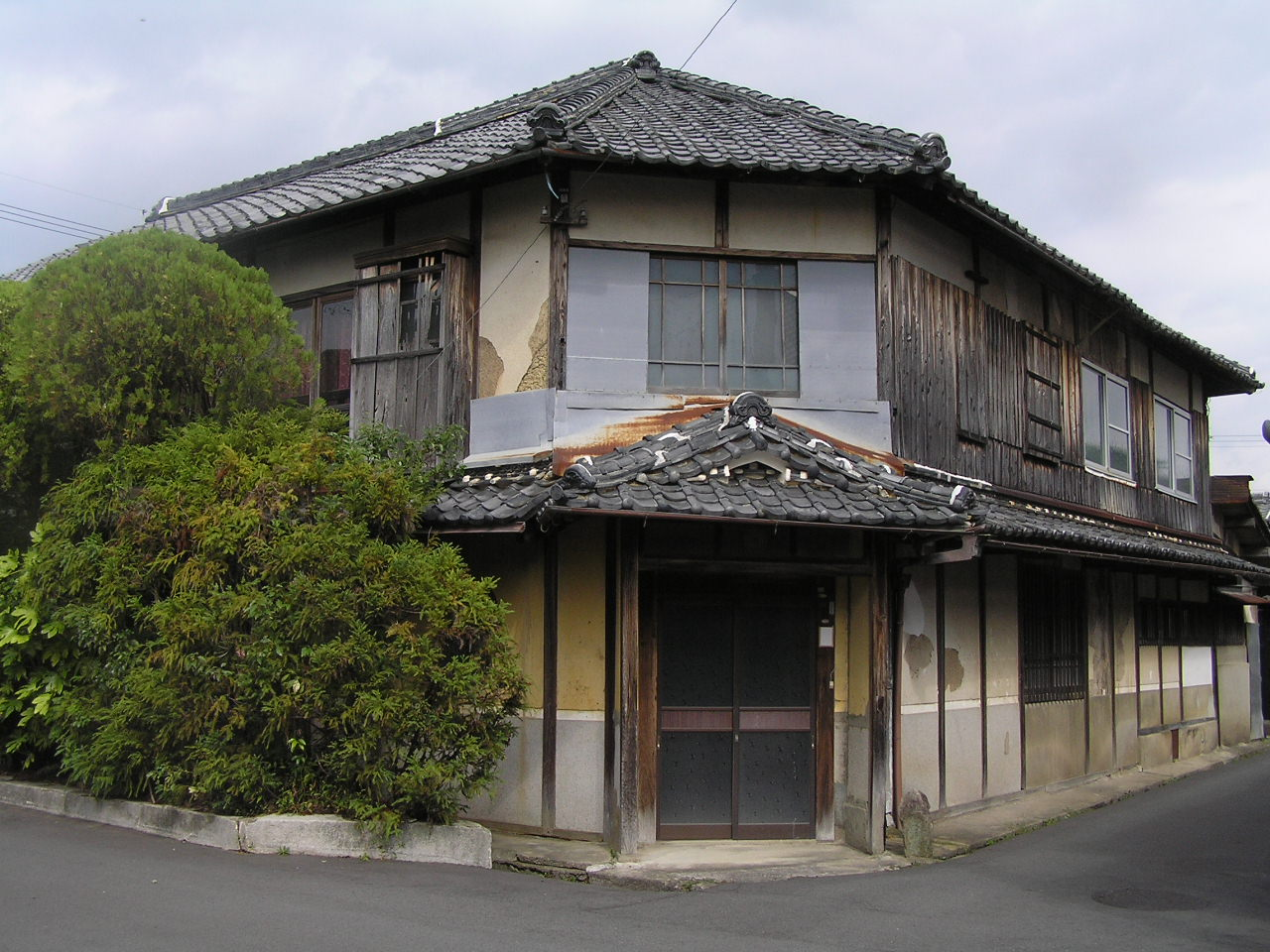
The brothel where Abe was arrested

Abe began work as a prostitute in Osaka's famous Tobita brothel district, but soon gained a reputation as a troublemaker. She stole money from clients and attempted to leave the brothel several times, but was soon tracked down by the well-organized legal prostitution system. After two years, Abe eventually succeeded in escaping and took a job as a waitress. However, not satisfied with the wages, she returned to prostitution, though now unlicensed, and began working in the unlicensed brothels of Osaka in 1932. After the death of her mother in January 1933, Abe traveled to Tokyo to visit her father, and her mother's grave. She entered into the prostitution market in Tokyo and while there became a mistress for the first time. When her father became gravely ill in January 1934, Abe nursed him for ten days until his death.

In October 1934, Abe was arrested in a police raid on the unlicensed brothel at which she was working at the time. Kinnosuke Kasahara, a well-connected friend of the brothel owner, arranged for her release. Kasahara was attracted to Abe, finding that she had no debts, and with Abe's agreement made her his mistress. He set up a house for Abe on December 20, 1934, and also provided her with an income. In his deposition to police, he remembered, "She was really strong, a real powerful one. Even though I am pretty jaded, she was enough to astound me. She wasn't satisfied unless we did it two, three, or four times a night. To her, it was unacceptable unless I had my hand on her private parts all night long… At first it was great, but after a couple of weeks I got a little exhausted." When Abe suggested that Kasahara leave his wife to marry her, he refused. She then asked Kasahara to allow her to take another lover, which he also refused. Their relationship ended and, to escape him, Abe left for Nagoya. Kasahara ended his testimony with an angry remark about Abe: "She is a slut and a whore. And as what she has done makes clear, she is a woman whom men should fear." Likewise, Abe remembered Kasahara in less than flattering terms, saying, "He didn't love me and treated me like an animal. He was the kind of scum who would then plead with me when I said that we should break up."

In Nagoya, again intending to leave the sex industry, Abe began working as a maid at a restaurant. She soon became romantically involved with a customer at the restaurant, Gorō Ōmiya, a professor and banker who aspired to become a member of the Diet of Japan. Knowing that the restaurant would not tolerate a maid having sexual relations with clients, and having become bored with Nagoya, Abe returned to Tokyo in June 1935. Ōmiya met her there and, finding that she had previously contracted syphilis, paid for her stay at a hot springs resort in Kusatsu from November 1935 until January 1936. In January, Ōmiya suggested that Abe could become financially independent by opening a small restaurant and recommended that she should start working as an apprentice in the restaurant business.

== Acquaintance with Kichizō Ishida ==
Back in Tokyo, Abe began work as an apprentice at the Yoshidaya restaurant on February 1, 1936. The owner of this establishment, 42-year-old Kichizō Ishida, had worked his way up in the business, starting as an apprentice at a restaurant specializing in eel dishes. He had opened Yoshidaya in Tokyo's Nakano ward in 1920. By the time Abe joined his restaurant, Ishida had become known as a womanizer who did little in the way of running the restaurant, which in actuality was managed by his wife.

Not long after Abe began work at Yoshidaya, Ishida began making amorous advances towards her. Ōmiya had never satisfied Abe sexually, and she was responsive to Ishida's approaches. In mid-April, Abe and Ishida initiated their sexual relationship in the restaurant to the accompaniment of a romantic ballad sung by one of the restaurant's geisha. On April 23, they met for a pre-arranged sexual encounter at a teahouse, or machiai—the contemporary equivalent of a love hotel—in the Shibuya ward. Planning only for a short fling, the couple instead remained in bed for four days. On the night of April 27, they moved to another teahouse in the distant neighborhood of Futako Tamagawa, where they continued to drink and have sex, occasionally with the accompaniment of a geisha's singing, and would continue even as maids entered the room to serve sake. They next moved to the Ogu neighborhood. Ishida did not return to his restaurant until the morning of May 8, after an absence of about two weeks. Of Ishida, Abe later said, "It is hard to say exactly what was so good about Ishida. But it was impossible to say anything bad about his looks, his attitude, his skill as a lover, the way he expressed his feelings. I had never met such a sexy man."

After their two-week encounter ended, Abe became agitated and began drinking excessively. She said that with Ishida she had come to know true love for the first time in her life, and the thought of Ishida being back with his wife made her intensely jealous. Just over a week before Ishida's eventual death, Abe began to contemplate his murder. On May 9 she attended a play in which a geisha attacked her lover with a large knife, after which she decided to threaten Ishida with a knife at their next meeting. On May 11, Abe pawned some of her clothing and used the money to buy a kitchen knife. She later described meeting Ishida that night: "I pulled the kitchen knife out of my bag and threatened him as had been done in the play I had seen, saying, 'Kichi, you wore that kimono just to please one of your favorite customers. You bastard, I'll kill you for that.' Ishida was startled and drew away a little, but he seemed delighted with it all…"

== Murder of Ishida ==
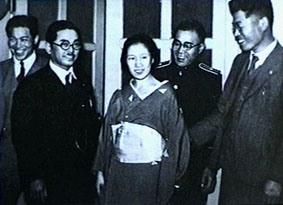
Newspaper photo taken shortly after Abe's arrest, at Takanawa Police Station, Tokyo on May 20, 1936

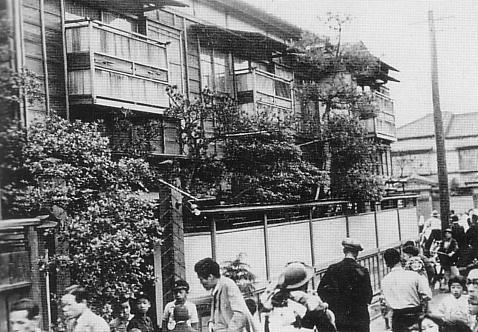
Site of the "Abe Sada Incident"

Ishida and Abe returned to Ogu, where they remained until his death. This time, during their lovemaking, Abe put the knife to the base of Ishida's penis and said she would make sure he would never play around with another woman. Ishida laughed at this. Two nights into this bout of sex, Abe began choking Ishida; he told her to continue, saying that this increased his arousal. She had him do it to her as well.

On the evening of May 16, Abe used her obi to cut off Ishida's breathing during orgasm, and they both enjoyed it. They repeated this for two more hours. Once Abe stopped the strangulation, Ishida's face became distorted and would not return to its normal appearance. He took thirty tablets of a sedative called Calmotin to try to soothe his pain. According to Abe, as Ishida started to doze, he told her, "You'll put the cord around my neck and squeeze it again while I'm sleeping, won't you… If you start to strangle me, don't stop, because it is so painful afterwards." Abe commented that she wondered if he had wanted her to kill him, but on reflection decided he must have been joking.

At about 2 a.m. on May 18, while Ishida was asleep, Abe wrapped her sash twice around his neck and strangled him to death. She later told police, "After I had killed Ishida I felt totally at ease, as though a heavy burden had been lifted from my shoulders, and I felt a sense of clarity." After lying with Ishida's body for a few hours, she next severed his penis and testicles with the knife, wrapped them in a magazine cover and kept them until her arrest three days later. With the blood she wrote Sada, Ishida no Kichi Futari-kiri (定、石田の吉二人キリ, "We, Sada and Kichi(zō) Ishida, are alone") on Ishida's left thigh, and on a bed sheet. She then carved 定 ("Sada", the character for her name) into his left arm. After putting on Ishida's underwear, she left the inn at about 8 a.m. after telling the staff not to disturb Ishida.

After leaving the inn, Abe met Ōmiya, her former lover. She repeatedly apologized to him, but Ōmiya, unaware of the murder, assumed that she was apologizing for having taken another lover. In actuality, Abe's apologies were for the damage to his political career that she knew his association with her was bound to cause. After Ishida's body was discovered, a search was launched for Abe, who had gone missing. On May 19, newspapers picked up the story. Ōmiya's career was ruined, and Abe's life was under intense public scrutiny from that point onwards.

== Abe Sada panic ==
The circumstances of Ishida's death immediately caused a national sensation. The ensuing frenzy over the search for Abe was called "Abe Sada panic". Police received reports of sightings of Abe from various cities, and one false sighting nearly caused a stampede in the Ginza, resulting in a large traffic jam. In a reference to the recent failed coup in Tokyo, the February 26 Incident or "Ni Ni-Roku Incident" ("2–26" or "February 26"), the crime was satirically dubbed "the Go Ichi-Hachi Incident" ("5–18" or "May 18").

On May 19, Abe went shopping and visited a cinema. Under a pseudonym, she stayed in an inn in the Shinagawa ward on May 20, where she had a massage and drank three bottles of beer. She spent the day writing farewell letters to Ishida, Ōmiya and a friend. Abe planned to commit suicide one week after the murder and practiced necrophilia. "I felt attached to Ishida's penis and thought that only after taking leave from it quietly could I then die. I unwrapped the paper holding them and gazed at his penis and scrotum. I put his penis in my mouth and even tried to insert it inside me… It didn't work however though I kept trying and trying. Then, I decided that I would flee to Osaka, staying with Ishida's penis all the while. In the end, I would jump from a cliff on Mount Ikoma while holding on to his penis."

At 4:00 in the afternoon, police detectives, suspicious of the alias under which Abe had registered, came to her room. "Don't be so formal," she told them. "You're looking for Sada Abe, right? Well, that's me. I am Sada Abe." When police were not convinced, she displayed Ishida's genitalia as proof.

Abe was arrested and interrogated over eight sessions. When asked why she had severed Ishida's genitalia, Abe replied, "Because I couldn't take his head or body with me. I wanted to take the part of him that brought back to me the most vivid memories." The interrogating officer was struck by Abe's demeanor when asked why she had killed Ishida: "Immediately she became excited and her eyes sparkled in a strange way." Her answer was: "I loved him so much, I wanted him all to myself. But since we were not husband and wife, as long as he lived, he could be embraced by other women. I knew that if I killed him no other woman could ever touch him again, so I killed him…"

In attempting to explain what distinguished Abe's case from over a dozen similar cases in Japan, William Johnston suggests that it is this answer which captured the imagination of the nation: "She had killed not out of jealousy but out of love." Mark Schreiber notes that the Abe case occurred at a time when Japanese media were preoccupied with extreme political and military troubles, including the February 26 Incident and a looming war with China. He suggests that a sensationalistic sex scandal such as this served as a welcome national release from the disturbing events of the time. The case also struck a chord with the ero guro nansensu ("erotic-grotesque-nonsense") cultural trend popular at the time, and the case came to represent that genre for years to come.

When the details of the crime were made public, rumors began to circulate that Ishida's penis was of extraordinary size; however, the police officer who interrogated Abe after her arrest denied this, saying, "Ishida's was just average. [Abe] told me, 'Size doesn't make a man in bed. Technique and his desire to please me were what I liked about Ishida.'" After her arrest, Ishida's penis and testicles were moved to Tokyo University Medical School's pathology museum. They were put on public display after the end of World War II but have since disappeared.

== Conviction and sentencing ==
The first day of Abe's trial was November 25, 1936; by 5 a.m., crowds were already gathering to attend. The judge presiding over the trial admitted to being sexually aroused by some of the details involved in the case yet made sure that the trial was held with the utmost seriousness. Abe's statement before receiving sentencing began, "The thing I regret most about this incident is that I have come to be misunderstood as some kind of sexual pervert… There had never been a man in my life like Ishida. There were men I liked, and with whom I slept without accepting money, but none made me feel the way I did toward him."

On December 21, Abe was convicted of murder and mutilation of a corpse. Though the prosecution demanded ten years, and Abe claimed that she desired the death penalty, she was in fact sentenced to just six years in prison. Abe was confined in Tochigi women's penitentiary, where she was prisoner No. 11. Her sentence was commuted on November 10, 1940, on the occasion of the 2,600th anniversary celebrations of the mythical founding of Japan, when Emperor Jimmu came to the throne. Abe was released exactly five years after the murder, on May 17, 1941.

The police record of Abe's interrogation and confession became a national best-seller in 1936. Christine L. Marran puts the national fascination with Abe's story within the context of the dokufu (毒婦) or "poison woman" stereotype, a transgressive female character type that had first become popular in Japanese serialized novels and stage works in the 1870s. In the wake of popular "poison woman" literature, confessional autobiographies by female criminals had begun appearing in the late 1890s. By the early 1910s, autobiographical writings by criminal women took on an unapologetic tone and sometimes included criticisms of Japanese society. Kanno Suga, who was hanged in 1911 for conspiring to assassinate Emperor Meiji in what was known as the High Treason Incident, wrote openly rebellious essays while in prison. Kaneko Fumiko, who was sentenced to death for plotting to assassinate the imperial family, used her notoriety to speak against the imperial system and the racism and paternalism she said it engendered. Abe's confession, in the years since its appearance, became the most circulated female criminal narrative in Japan. Marran points out that Abe, unlike previous criminal autobiographers, stressed her sexuality and the love she felt for her victim.

== Later life ==
Upon release from prison, Abe assumed a pseudonym. As the mistress of a "serious man", whom she referred to in her memoirs as "Y", she moved first to Ibaraki Prefecture and then to Saitama Prefecture. When Abe's true identity became known to Y's friends and family, she broke off their relationship.

In the aftermath of World War II, wishing to divert public attention from politics and criticism of the Allied occupation authorities, the Yoshida government encouraged a "3-S" policy—"sports, screen, and sex". Pre-war writings, such as The Psychological Diagnosis of Abe Sada (1937), depict Abe as an example of the dangers of unbridled female sexuality and as a threat to the patriarchal system. In the postwar era, she was treated as a critic of totalitarianism, and a symbol of freedom from oppressive political ideologies. Abe became a popular subject in literature of both high and low quality. The buraiha writer Sakunosuke Oda wrote two stories based on Abe, and a June 1949 article noted that Abe had recently tried to clear her name after it had been used in a "mountain" of erotic books.

In 1946, the writer Ango Sakaguchi interviewed Abe, treating her as an authority on both sexuality and freedom. He called Abe a "tender, warm figure of salvation for future generations." In 1947, Ichiro Kimura's The Erotic Confessions of Abe Sada became a national bestseller, with over 100,000 copies sold. The book was in the form of an interview with Abe but was actually based on the police interrogation records. As a response to this book, Abe wrote her own autobiography, Memoirs of Abe Sada, which was published in 1948. In contrast to Kimura's depiction of her as a pervert, she stressed her love for Ishida. The first edition of the magazine True Story (実話, Jitsuwa), in January 1948, featured previously unpublished photos of the incident with the headline "Ero-guro of the Century! First Public Release. Pictorial of the Abe Sada Incident." Reflecting the change in tone in writings on Abe, the June 1949 issue of Monthly Reader called her a "Heroine of That Time" for following her own desires in a time of "false morality" and oppression.

Abe capitalized on her notoriety by sitting for an interview with a popular magazine, and, beginning in 1947, appearing for several years in a traveling one-act stage production called Shōwa Ichidai Onna (A Woman of the Shōwa Period) under the direction of dramatist Nagata Mikihiko. In 1952 she began working at the Hoshikikusui, a working-class pub in Inari-chō, in Tokyo's Taitō ward. Abe lived a low-profile life in Tokyo's Shitaya neighborhood for the next twenty years, and her neighborhood restaurant association gave her a "model employee" award.

More than once, during the 1960s, film-critic Donald Richie visited the Hoshikikusui. In his collection of profiles, Japanese Portraits, he describes Abe making a dramatic entrance into a boisterous group of drinkers. She would slowly descend a long staircase that led into the middle of the crowd, fixing a haughty gaze on individuals in her audience. The men in the pub would respond by putting their hands over their crotches, and shouting out things like, "Hide the knives!" and "I'm afraid to go and pee!" Abe would slap the banister in anger and stare the crowd into an uncomfortable and complete silence, and only then continue her entrance, chatting and pouring drinks from table to table. Richie comments, "…she had actually choked a man to death and then cut off his member. It was a consequent frisson when Sada Abe slapped your back."

In 1969, Abe appeared in the "Sada Abe Incident" section of director Teruo Ishii's dramatized documentary History of Bizarre Crimes by Women in the Meiji, Taishō, and Shōwa Eras (明治大正昭和 猟奇女犯罪史, Meiji Taishō Shōwa Ryōki Onna Hanzaishi), and the last known photograph of Abe was taken in August of that year.

Abe disappeared from the public eye in 1970. That year, she fell into financial ruin when a young lover stole a large amount of cash in her possession. When the film In the Realm of the Senses (1976) was in production, director Nagisa Ōshima apparently sought out Abe and, after a long search, reportedly found her, her hair shorn, in a nunnery in Kansai.

== Legacy ==
Decades after both the incident and her disappearance, Abe continues to draw public interest:

- In addition to the documentary in which Abe herself appeared shortly before she disappeared from the public eye, and the 1976 Japanese-language In the Realm of the Senses, at least three successful films have been made based on the story. In 1998, a 438-page biography of Abe was published in Japan, and the first full-length book on Abe in English, William Johnston's Geisha, Harlot, Strangler, Star: A Woman, Sex, and Morality in Modern Japan, was published in 2005.
- Japanese Noise musician Merzbow adopted the alias Abe Sada for an early musical project. He released only one record under this name, the 1994 7" Original Body Kingdom/Gala Abe Sada 1936.
- In March 2007, a four-bass noise band from Perth, Australia, named Abe Sada won a Contemporary Music Grant from the Australian Department of Culture and the Arts to tour Japan in June and July 2007.

== Court documents ==
Undisclosed court documents were transcribed (or photographed) by someone and leaked to the outside. From his upbringing, he wrote about the situation before and after the crime, and it was published underground as "Glossy Record". From his upbringing, he wrote about the situation before and after the crime, and it was published underground as "Glossy Record".It is a first-class document related to the Abe Sada case.

  - Chimao Nakazawa's book, "Abe Retirement Chronology", contains the contents of the leaked pretrial inquiry record, summarized in a chronological format from the birth of Sada Abe to the incident and her arrest.

== Sada Abe in literature ==
- 阿部 [Abe], 定 [Sada] (1998). 前坂, 俊之 (ed.). 阿部定手記―愛の半生 [Memoirs of Abe Sada: Half a Lifetime of Love] (in Japanese). Tokyo: 中公文庫. ISBN 978-4-12-203072-5.
- 鮒橋[Funabashi], 正一 [Seiichi] (1947). 阿部定行状記 (Abe Sada gyōjō-ki) [A Record of Abe Sada's Behavior] (in Japanese). 紅書房.
- 冬木 [Fuyuki], 健 [Takeshi] (1947). 愛欲に泣きぬれる女 あべさだの辿つた半生 (Aiyoku ni nakinureta onna: Abe Sada no tadotta hansei) [Woman Tearstained in Passion: The Life Led by Abe Sada] (in Japanese). 国際書房.
- Kimura, Ichirō (1947). お定色ざんげ―阿部定の告白 [The Erotic Confessions of Abe Sada] (in Japanese). Tokyo: Kawade Shobo Shinsha. Reprint: ISBN 978-4-309-40530-8.
- Nagata, Mikihiko (1950–1951). Jitsuroku: Abe Sada/Jōen ichidai onna [True Story: Abe Sada (a.k.a.) Impassioned Woman of Love] (in Japanese).
- Oda, Sakunosuke (1946). Sesō [The State of the Times] (in Japanese).
- Oda, Sakunosuke (1947). Yōfu [The Seductress] (in Japanese).
- Satō, Makoto. Abe Sada's Dogs, avant-garde play.
- Sekine, Hiroshi (1971). "Abe Sada", poem.
- Tōkyō Seishin Bunsekigaku Kenkyōjo (1937). The Psychoanalytic Diagnosis of Sada Abe (Abe Sada no seishin bunseki teki shindan).
- Watanabe, Junichi (1997). Shitsuraken [A Lost Paradise].. A novel modeled on the Abe incident.

== Sada Abe in film ==
- 1969 - Teruo Ishii's 1969 Love & Crime starring Yukie Kagawa. The film also features an interview with Abe.
- 1975 – Noboru Tanaka's A Woman Called Sada Abe starring Junko Miyashita.
- 1976 – Nagisa Oshima's In the Realm of the Senses starring Eiko Matsuda.
- 1998 – Nobuhiko Obayashi's Sada starring Hitomi Kuroki.
- 2011 – Kyoko Aizome's Abe Sada Saigo no Nanokakan starring Yuma Asami.

== See also ==
- List of people who disappeared mysteriously: 1910–1990
