= Love Hunter =

- Theatrical poster
- Directed by: Seiichirō Yamaguchi
- Written by: Kiyomi Kōyama (pseudonym for Seiichirō Yamaguchi and Tatsumi Kumashiro)
- Starring: Hidemi Hara; Mari Tanaka; Sumiko Minami
- Cinematography: Shōhei Andō
- Edited by: Atsushi Nabeshima
- Music by: Riichirō Manabe
- Distributed by: Nikkatsu
- Release date: January 8, 1972 (Japan)
- Running time: 72 minutes
- Country: Japan
- Language: Japanese

Love Hunter (Japanese: 恋の狩人 ラブ・ハンター, Hepburn: Koi no karyūdo: Rabu hantaa) is a 1972 Japanese film in Nikkatsu's Roman Porno series, directed by Seiichirō Yamaguchi and starring Hidemi Hara, Mari Tanaka, and Sumiko Minami. The film was banned for obscenity, and director Yamaguchi arrested. The resulting trials were the last time that a film was prosecuted for obscenity in Japan.

== Synopsis ==
Kyōko is a woman with a promiscuous past who is sexually unsatisfied with her marriage. Her frustrations lead her to have hedonistic dreams, such as her mother and grandfather having sex together. Seeking to rejuvenate her marriage, she throws a wild party. The ploy is a success.

== Cast ==
- Hidemi Hara: Kyōko
- Mari Tanaka: Hisako
- Gen Mitamura: Hideyuki
- Uju Ranko: Keiko
- Ryūji Ōizumi: Kazuo
- Sumiko Minami: Mother
- Akira Takahashi: Chef
- Akemi Yamaguchi: Jōji
- Juju: Jun

== Background ==
The screenwriting credit, Kiyomi Kōyama, was a stage name for director Yamaguchi and prominent Roman Porno director Tatsumi Kumashiro. Sumiko Minami was a Nikkatsu veteran from the Nikkatsu Action days. Many of the studio's staff from this pre-Roman Porno era had left rather than make films in the softcore pink style that the studio had adopted in 1971. Minami was one of the few performers who remained, and audiences were given a shock to see this actress in previously conservative roles performing perverse scenes such as sex with her father in the dream sequence.

== Reaction ==
No Japanese film had been prosecuted for obscenity since Tetsuji Takechi's Black Snow (1965), which ended up in a victory for the filmmaker. When Nikkatsu started its Roman Porno series in November 1971, it opened to critical and box-office success with the double-release Apartment Wife: Affair In the Afternoon and Castle Orgies. The interest of the authorities was also aroused, and with the release of Love Hunter in January 1972, they took action.

The Tokyo Metropolitan Police arrested director Yamaguchi as well as other Nikkatsu employees. Inspectors for Eirin, the Japanese film industry's self-monitoring organization, were also indicted for passing the film. All copies of the film, as well as the accompanying features, Katsuhiko Fujii's Office Lady Diary: Scent of a She-Cat and Kaoru Umezawa's independent pink film, Highschool Geisha were included in the raid.

Yamaguchi had been one of the Hachirō Guryū, the eight writers for Suzuki's Branded to Kill (1967). He took an adversarial approach to the prosecution, announcing publicly that he was being "crucified", and was "nothing but a scapegoat". His confrontational stance made him popular with the media, but Nikkatsu considered him a troublemaker. During the period leading up to the trial, Yamaguchi filmed a sequel to Love Hunter, Love Hunter: Desire (1973), a story about a stripper who is arrested for obscenity. Mari Tanaka, who had had a supporting role in the original film, was the star of the sequel. The obvious baiting of the authorities intended by the film only added to his trouble with the government and the studio. After starting work on a second sequel, Love Hunter: Lustful Murder, Nikkatsu fired Yamaguchi and had Masaru Konuma finish the project. Yamaguchi moved to Art Theatre Guild where he made one more film.

Through her involvement in Love Hunter, its sequel, and Warmth of Love (1972), which the police accused of obscenity three months later, but did not prosecute, actress Mari Tanaka became a favorite of anti-establishment organizations. Leading Nikkatsu filmmaker Tatsumi Kumashiro was inspired by the Love Hunter trial to direct several films with an anti-censorship theme. Among them were The World of Geisha, and Woods Are Wet (both 1973). Kumashiro's Woods Are Wet: Woman Hell would also run afoul of the police, when they shut it down on May 29, 1973, insisting that Eirin review it again.

In 1978 the Tokyo District Court declared that while the film contained obscenity, it was not, as a whole, obscene. The prosecution appealed the decision, and in July 1980 all of the accused were acquitted. The group of legal suits instigated by Love Hunter were, as of 2009, the last time that a film was prosecuted for obscenity in Japan.

== Availability ==
Love Hunter was released on DVD in Japan on December 21, 2007, as part of Geneon's tenth wave of Nikkatsu Roman porno series.
