= Noboru Tanaka =

Japanese film director (1937–2006)

- Born: August 15, 1937; Hakuba, Nagano, Japan
- Died: October 4, 2006 (aged 69)
- Occupations: Film director and screenwriter
- Years active: 1972 – 1988
- Awards: Best New Director, Japan Society of Film Directors: 1973

Noboru Tanaka (田中 登, Tanaka Noboru; August 15, 1937 – October 4, 2006) was a Japanese film director known for his Roman Porno films, including three critically respected films known as the Showa trilogy: A Woman Called Sada Abe (aka Sada Abe: Docu-Drama) (1975), Watcher in the Attic (1976), and Beauty's Exotic Dance: Torture! (1977), all three starring Nikkatsu Roman porno queen Junko Miyashita. The first film in this trilogy recounted the story of Sada Abe a year before Nagisa Oshima's internationally released In the Realm of the Senses (1976), which told the same story. Though at the time he was working, his career was overshadowed by directors such as Tatsumi Kumashiro and Chūsei Sone, many critics today judge Tanaka the best of Nikkatsu's Roman porno directors.

== Life and career ==
=== Early life ===
Tanaka was born in Hakuba in Nagano prefecture on August 15, 1937. He majored in French literature at Meiji University in Tokyo. Tanaka said that his interest in the cinema came about through a circuitous route. Early in life he wanted to be a novelist. His interest in writing shifted to poetry. Tanaka remembered, "I wrote a lot of poems. Each expression in a poem may contain countless meanings, otherwise it wouldn't be a good poem. In other words, each expression provides a lot of imagery. Then I thought that in reverse, I could use images to express my poetic world. I thought the image world of film-making might be what I should explore."

While working on his thesis, dealing with this interest in the relationship between imagery and literature, Tanaka took a part-time job at a movie studio to gain first-hand knowledge of film production. He served as a production assistant on Kurosawa's Yojimbo (1961), an experience which created Tanaka's enthusiasm for the film industry. After graduation, he applied to Nikkatsu studios for a job as an assistant director and passed their entrance exam. In this capacity, he worked under some of the studio's best directors of the time, including Seijun Suzuki and Shōhei Imamura. Among the films on which Tanaka worked at this time was Imamura's The Pornographers.

=== Roman porno ===
"I think Nikkatsu's position in the industry is unique. It's a large company, but we worked on one single concept, sex, for 18 years, and made a very large number of films. Having sex is an activity where we clearly show our true natures. Examining the relationships between men and women is one of the best ways to show the essence of human beings. So we thought that by working with the theme of sex, we could explore ourselves more deeply and express the very core of the world."
– Noboru Tanaka

In the late 1960s, Nikkatsu began having severe financial trouble due to audiences lost to television and an influx of Western films. In order to avoid bankruptcy, Takashi Itamochi, president of Nikkatsu, made the decision to put the company's high production values and professional talent into the adult, or pink film industry as a way of attracting a new audience. Nikkatsu called its line of pink films "Roman Porno", and started the series in November 1971. Rather than work in sex films, many directors left the studio at this time, opening up positions for younger directors in their wake. Tanaka remembers his attitude about Nikkatsu's decision, "I was excited and positive about the changes, and was very eager to work in this new genre as a director."

The studio gave its Roman porno directors a great deal of artistic freedom. Beyond budgetary and time restraints, the only rule was that the film meet the official minimum quota of four nude or sex scenes per hour. Patrick Macias notes the diversity of styles this format allowed. Director Chūsei Sone "specialized in ribald tales from the past", Yasuharu Hasebe, "delivered frightening, raw, and violent images", and Tanaka created films which were "as sophisticated as they were erotic." In later years, reflecting on his work in the genre, Tanaka pointed out, "We can look at the core of human beings without disguising anything and can express ourselves very honestly. That's why working on Roman porno is such an enjoyable experience."

Tanaka was given his first chance to direct in 1972 with the early Roman porno, Beads From a Petal. Originally called I Am Burning Up (Moeagaru Watashi), a title Tanaka always preferred, the story deals with the sexual awakening of a frigid woman. Tanaka meant the film to be an allegorical depiction of Japanese society in the post-war years, later saying, "After the war, Japan suffered from frigidity and the film described how the psychological bruises Japan suffered from would gradually be cured as time passed, through a young woman's life." Though criticized for some heavy-handed symbolism, this first film showed Tanaka's ability to give a movie a strikingly interesting look.

The same year, Tanaka directed Night of the Felines, an unusually realistic look at the lives of a group of prostitutes. This is considered one of Tanaka's early major films. Also in 1972, he gained critical approval for his Woman on the Night Train. Even in this early work Tanaka's direction is called, "some of the best in any pink film."

As his career progressed, Tanaka's films became known for their imaginative, sometimes surreal, use of color and poetic imagery within the setting of a harsh, brutal world. In 1973, Tanaka directed the second entry in the Secret Chronicle trilogy, Secret Chronicle: Torture Hell. In contrast to the first entry in the trilogy, a satirical depiction of a 19th-century brothel, Tanaka's film was a serious look at religious-sexual ceremonies at a temple. For this effort, Tanaka won the Directors Guild of Japan New Directors Citation in 1973. The last film of this trilogy, Secret Chronicle: She Beast Market (1974) returned to the satirical style of the first film. The cast included the popular poet Sakumi Hagiwara playing the memorable role of a man who simultaneously commits suicide and wipes out a gang of yakuza when he explodes a gas-filled inflatable sex-doll.

Tanaka's visual flair raised Private Life of a School Mistress (1973) above its lackluster story of a female teacher and her romantic relationship with a male student. The mainstream film journal Eiga Geijutsu put the film at eighth place on its list of the top ten films of the year. While employed at Nikkatsu, Tanaka also made a few films outside of the pink genre for other studios. For Toei, he filmed Kobe International Gang (1975) and Escape of Gangster Ando Noboru, starring the yakuza-turned-actor Noboru Ando himself.

A black-and-white film employing handheld camera and a fragmented, impressionistic narrative structure, Tanaka's Confidential Report: Sex Market (1974) is among the most unusual-looking films in the Roman Porno series. The first film in Tanaka's Showa Trilogy, A Woman Called Sada Abe is more conventional than most of his films, but highly regarded by critics. Tanaka was proud of his ability to produce a high-quality film on a minimal budget. Nikkatsu allotted 7,500,000 yen (approximately US$65,000) for their Roman porno films, but Tanaka used only about 6,600,000 yen to make A Woman Called Sada Abe. Tanaka later explained, "I managed to make it for about 900,000 yen under budget. I believe it depends on the initial concept. I was confident that as long as the concept was good, it would become a great film and beat any of those films made for 10,000,000 yen. I think that's the most interesting thing about film-making: it's so unpredictable. 'Abe Sada's' simple lip movement could say more and be more appealing to an audience than thousands of horses running around a field. It's possible that lip movement could be more effective than thousands of horses and that's why film-making is very creative and incredibly interesting."

The second entry Tanaka's Showa Trilogy, Watcher in the Attic (1976), also starring Sada Abe's Junko Miyashita, was a breakthrough for Tanaka. Magill's Survey of Cinema calls this adaptation of a Rampo Edogawa novel "a frenzied fantasy treat." In 1970 the story had been given a straight pink film treatment by actress Rumi Tama's husband, director Akitaka Kimata, founder of Pro Taka and Million Film. Mainstream critics recognized that Tanaka's work in this film made it stand out from its modest pink film origins. The Peer Cinema Club Annual, a conservative publication which did not normally concern itself with Pink films, judged it "a perfect marriage of decadence and art." Tanaka's depictions of Edogawa's ero guro nansensu style, voyeurism and the Taishō period were influential on later films such as Kazuyoshi Okuyama's Mystery of Rampo (1994), Akio Jissōji's Rampo films, including The D-Slope Murder Case (1998), and Rampo Noir (2005).

The third film in the Showa Trilogy, Beauty's Exotic Dance: Torture! (1977) while still a box-office hit, was not as well-received by the critics of the time as the two preceding entries, perhaps because of its more extreme, sado-masochistic theme.

Rape and Death of a Housewife (1978), despite its sensationalistic title, is considered one of Tanaka's masterpieces, and was his major mainstream critical break-through. Kinema Jumpo gave the film their "Best Film" award for 1979, and Tanaka was nominated for Best Director at the second Japanese Academy of Films and Motion Pictures ceremony for this film and Pink Salon: Five Lewd Women (also 1978). Pink Salon: Five Lewd Women was praised for its sympathetic view to the women characters, somewhat unusual for a Roman porno. Some critics have commented on the story's similarity to Ridley Scott's 1991 Thelma & Louise.

=== Later years ===
After a few lean years, Tanaka made a come-back effort with the third entry in the Angel Guts series, the critical and box-office success, Angel Guts: Nami (1980). Jasper Sharp writes that, from the point of character, plotting and construction, Tanaka's film is the most satisfying entry in the series, based on an adult manga by Takashi Ishii. He notes, however, that Tanaka's visuals are over-active make the film a difficult one for most viewers. Tanaka recalled, "I was determined to make a film which was much more impressive than the comic. One image of a film has to be much more impressive than one frame of the comic. That's what film is all about. For the scene in which we see Nami's eye in close-up on the screen, I shot about 3,000 feet of film just to show the details of her eye and [its] movement, including the pulsing of a blood vessel."

After making nearly 25 films for Nikkatsu, Tanaka left the studio to try his hand at directing mainstream films for other studios. He directed several hits including the 1983 Shochiku film, Village of Doom, inspired by the Tsuyama massacre. He returned to Nikkatsu to direct Monster Woman '88 (1988) and then retired from the film industry. Allmovie writes that Tanaka was a director of films "so adventurous and bizarre that he soon became one of Japan's most celebrated directors," while Jasper Sharp judges him, "[t]he most visually-gifted of Nikkatsu's directors of the period." Just as international recognition was beginning to come to Tanaka, he died of a brain aneurysm on October 4, 2006.

== Filmography ==
Title	Cast	Release date
Beads from a Petal 花弁のしずく; Kaben no Shizuku	Rie Nakagawa; Keiko Maki; Kazuko Shirakawa	1972-02-09
Night of the Cats 牝猫たちの夜; Mesunekotachi no Yoru	Tomoko Katsura; Hidemi Hara; Ken Yoshizawa	1972-05-17
Woman on the Night Train 夜汽車の女; Yogisha no Onna	Mari Tanaka; Keiko Tsuzuki; Toshihiko Oda	1972-07-19
The Amorous Family: The Fox and the Badger 好色家族 狐と狸; Koshoku Kazoku: Kitsune to Tanuki	Mari Tanaka; Mikiko Sakai; Hidemi Hara	1972-09-06
Excitement Class: Love Techniques 官能教室 愛のテクニック; Kanno Kyoshitsu: Ai no Technique	Mari Tanaka; Nobutaka Masutomi; Ryoji Nakamura	1972-11-08
Love in the Afternoon: Metamorphosis 昼下りの情事 変身; Hirusagari no Joji: Henshin	Miyoko Aoyama; Keiko Aikawa; Akira Takahashi	1973-01-24
Confidential: The Hell of Tortured Prostitutes (秘)女郎責め地獄; Maruhi: Jorozeme Jigoku	Rie Nakagawa; Yuri Yamashina; Hijiri Abe	1973-04-14
Strange Feelings During the Night 真夜中の妖精; Mayonaka no Yosei	Yuri Yamashina; Morio Kazama; Setsuko Ohyama	1973-07-14
Private Life of a School Mistress 女教師 私生活; Onna Kyoshi: Shiseikatsu	Ayako Ichikawa; Morio Kazama; Hitomi Kozue	1973-08-25
Confidential: Sexual Market (秘)色情めす市場; Maruhi: Shikijo Mesu Ichiba	Meika Seri; Genshu Hanayagi; Junko Miyashita	1974-09-11
A Woman Called Sada Abe 実録阿部定; Jitsuroku: Abe Sada	Junko Miyashita; Hideaki Ezumi; Nagatoshi Sakamoto	1975-02-08
International Gang in Kobe 神戸国際ギャング; Kobe Kokusai Gang		1975-10-14
Watcher in the Attic 江戸川乱歩猟奇館 屋根裏の散歩者; Edogawa Rampo Ryoki-kan: Yaneura no Sanposha	Junko Miyashita; Renji Ishibashi; Tokuko Watanabe	1976-06-12
Sex Life and Escape of the Gangster Ando Noboru 安藤昇のわが逃亡とＳＥＸの記録; Ando Noboru no Waga Toto to Sex no Kiroku		1976-10-01
Beauty's Exotic Dance: Torture! 発禁本「美人乱舞」より責める！ Hakkinbon Bijin Ranbu Yori: Semeru!	Junko Miyashita; Hatsuo Yamaya; Maya Kudo	1977-02-23
School Mistress 女教師; Onna Kyoshi	Eiko Nagashima; Yasuo Furoya	1977-10-29
Rape And Death Of A Housewife 人妻集団暴行致死事件; Hitozuma Shudan Boko Chishi Jiken	Hideo Murota; Noriko Kurosawa; Akira Sakai	1978-07-08
Pink Salon: Five Amorous Women ピンクサロン 好色五人女; Pink Salon: Koshoku Gonin Onna	Erina Miyai; Kyoko Aoyama; Miyako Yamaguchi	1978-11-03
Angel Guts: Nami 天使のはらわた 名美; Tenshi no Harawata: Nami	Eri Kanuma; Takeo Chii; Minako Minushima	1979-07-07
Target of Lust 愛欲の標的; Aiyoku no Hyoteki	Erina Miyai; Minako Mizushima; Shin Nakamaru	1979-12-22
Hard Scandal: Drifter of Sex ハードスキャンダル 性の漂流者; Hard Scandal: Sei no Hyoryu-sha	Ako; Rie Kitahara; Yudo Yoshikawa	1980-10-04
"Love Me Strong... Love Me Hard" もっと激しくもっとつよく; Motto Hageshiku Motto Tsuyoku	Maki Kawamura; Izumi Shima; Tatsuo Yamada	1981-05-15
Village of Doom 丑三つの村; Ushimitsu no Mura		1983-01-15
View of the Bud 蕾の眺め; Tsubomi no Nagame	Yōko Kon; Mitsuru Hirata; Kōichi Satō	1986-04-26
Monster Woman '88 妖女伝説'８８; Yojo Densetsu '88		1988-09-23

== Sources ==
- Crow, Jonathan. "Noboru Tanaka (Biography)". at Allmovie. Archived from the original on 2006-04-26.
- "性と愛のフーガ 田中登の世界 (A Fugue of Sex and Love: Noboru Tanaka's World)". The Seventh Art Teather (in Japanese). 2007. Archived from the original on 2007-10-30. (Retrospective program of Tanaka's work)
- "NOBORU TANAKA". at The Complete Index to World Film.
- Noboru Tanaka at IMDb
- "Noboru Tanaka -Director". 2005. in Angel Guts - The Nikkatsu Series - 5 Disc Collector's Edition. www.artsmagicdvd.com ATU 017. Disc three: Angel Guts: Nami. Biographies.
- Sharp, Jasper (2008). Behind the Pink Curtain: The Complete History of Japanese Sex Cinema. Guildford: FAB Press. ISBN 978-1-903254-54-7.
- Sharp, Jasper (interviewer); Sharon Hayashi (interpreter) (2005). Noboru Tanaka Interview (included with Angel Guts - The Nikkatsu Series - 5 Disc Collector's Edition; Disc Three: Angel Guts: Nami) (Motion Picture/DVD). Nikkatsu / artsmagicdvd.com ATU 017.
- "田中登 (Tanaka Noboru)" (in Japanese). Japanese Movie Database.
- Thompson, Bill (1985). "Jitsuroko [sic] Abe Sada". In Frank N. Magill (ed.). Magill's Survey of Cinema: Foreign Language Films; Volume 4. Englewood Cliffs, N.J.: Salem Press. pp. 1568–1573. ISBN 0-89356-247-5.
- "ポルノ映画の巨匠・田中登監督が死去 (Obituary)" (in Japanese). www.sponichi.co.jp. 2006-10-05. Archived from the original on 2016-01-19.
- "「優美なる死骸遊び」 に魅せられた作家 プログラム・ピクチャーの遺産 (5-part interview with Tanaka)" (in Japanese). CineMagaziNet!. 1994-03-13.

== See also ==
- List of Nikkatsu Roman Porno films
