= Shinsaku Himeda =

Japanese film cinematographer (1916–1997)

- Born: November 19, 1916; Kakogawa, Hyōgo Prefecture, Japan
- Died: July 29, 1997 (aged 80)
- Occupation: cinematographer

Shinsaku Himeda (姫田 真佐久, Himeda Shinsaku; 19 November 1916 – 29 July 1997) was a Japanese cinematographer from Kakogawa, Hyōgo Prefecture.

Himeda dropped out of Teikoku Art University and started working as an assistant cameraman at the Nikkatsu Tamagawa studio in 1937. In 1949, he promoted to cinematographer. He moved to Nikkatsu film company in 1954 and often worked with Shōhei Imamura. In 1964, Himeda received the Mainichi Film Award for Best Cinematography award for his work in Unholy Desire.

He received an Oscar nomination for the Academy Award for Best Cinematography along with Charles F. Wheeler, Osamu Furuya and Masamichi Satoh for his work in Tora! Tora! Tora!.

He left Nikkatsu and became a freelance cinematographer in 1978.In 1980, he won the Best Cinematographer award at the 3rd Japan Academy Film Prize for his work in Vengeance Is Mine.

== Filmography ==
- Haha Kobai (1949)
- Keisatsu Nikki (1955)
- Red Quay (1958)
- My Second Brother (1959)
- Mutekiga Ore o Yondeiru (1960)
- Pigs and Battleships (1961)
- A Killer Without a Grave (1961)
- Foundry Town (1962)
- The Insect Woman (1963)
- Unholy Desire (1964)
- A Chain of Islands (1965)
- The Pornographers (1966)
- Higashi Shinakai (1968)
- Savage Wolf Pack (1969)
- Tora! Tora! Tora! (1970)
- Men and War (1970)
- Ichijo's Wet Lust (1972)
- Front Row Life (1972)
- The World of Geisha (1973)
- Lovers Are Wet (1973)
- Failed Youth aka Bitterness of Youth (1974)
- Tokyo Emmanuelle (1975)
- Proof of the Man (1977)
- Never Give up (1978)
- Vengeance Is Mine (1979)
- Tempyō no Iraka (1980)
- Eijanaika (1981)
- To Trap a Kidnapper (1982)
- Okinawan Boys (1983)
- Abunai Deka (1987)
- Hachiko Monogatari (1987)
- Hotarugawa (1987)
- Hana no Furu Goro (1989)
- Tobu yume o shibaraku minai (1990)
- Futaridake no Island (1991)

== Honours ==
- Nihon Eiga Gijyutsu Award for Best Cinemagraphy (1964, 1965, 1966, 1970, 1982)
- Mainichi Film Award for Best Cinematography – Unholy Desire (1964)
- Japan Academy Film Prize for Best Cinematographer – Vengeance Is Mine(1980)
- Japan Academy Film Prize for Best Cinematographer – To Trap a Kidnapper (1983)
- Japan Academy Film Prize for Best Cinematographer – Hotarugawa (1987)
- Order of the Sacred Treasure 4th Class (1992)
