= Five and the Skin =

1982 film

- Film poster
- Directed by: Pierre Rissient
- Written by: Lucie Albertini; Alain Archambault; Eugène Guillevic; Pierre Rissient
- Produced by: Ronaldo S. Atienza
- Starring: Féodor Atkine
- Cinematography: Alain Derobe
- Edited by: Marie-José Chauvel
- Release date: 2 June 1982
- Running time: 95 minutes
- Country: France
- Language: French

Five and the Skin (French: Cinq et la peau) is a 1982 French drama film directed by Pierre Rissient. It was screened in the Un Certain Regard section at the 1982 Cannes Film Festival.

== Cast ==
- Féodor Atkine – Ivan
- Eiko Matsuda – Mari
- Gloria Diaz
- Bembol Roco – Bembol (as Rafael Roco)
- Phillip Salvador – Carding
- Louie Pascua – Dencar
- Joel Lamangan
- Roberto Padua
- Maila Marcello
- Stella Ruiz
- Jenny Decolongon
- Maki Matsumoto – Maki
- Menchu Menchaca
- Tess Galang
- Chat Silayan
- Cheng Bernardez
- Merissa Menesses
- Diane Benisano
