= A Woman Called Sada Abe =

- DVD cover
- Directed by: Noboru Tanaka
- Written by: Akio Ido
- Produced by: Yoshihiro Yuhki
- Starring: Junko Miyashita; Hideaki Esumi
- Cinematography: Masaru Mori
- Music by: Koichi Sakata
- Distributed by: Nikkatsu (Japan)
- Release date: February 8, 1975
- Running time: 76 min.
- Country: Japan
- Language: Japanese

A Woman Called Sada Abe (実録阿部定, Jitsuroku Abe Sada) aka Sada Abe: A Docu-Drama (1975) is a Roman porno version of the Sada Abe story directed by Noboru Tanaka.

It is based on the true story of a woman who strangled her lover during a love-making session, then severed his penis, which she carried with her until her arrest. The story became a national sensation in Japan in 1936, developing mythic overtones, and has since been interpreted by artists, philosophers, novelists and filmmakers.

== Plot ==
Over a black screen, Sada Abe (Junko Miyashita) tells some of the aliases she had used in her past. The opening concludes when the words "Kichi Sada 2" appear on the screen, followed by a newspaper headline, "Document: Sada Abe", which is the Japanese title of the film. The lovers, Sada and Kichi (Hideaki Esumi), are then shown together, with Kichi predicting that he will die if their love-making continues.

Soldiers pass the couple as they enter an inn, placing the story in the context of Japan's military build-up. They engage in a love-making session which lasts between April 23 and May 7, 1936. Some of their S&M games involve knives, biting and mutual strangulation. When Kichi leaves Sada for a shave, she jealously accuses him of "committing adultery" on her with his wife.

Soldiers are seen marching past a crowd which is listening to a report of the "February 26 Incident" on the radio. Sada and Kichi, uninterested, leave the crowd to continue their love-making. After strangling each other with their obis (kimono sashes), Kichi's neck is red, and Sada sends for a doctor. Kichi is told to go on a liquid diet, and he plans to return home for two months to recover. Sada is upset at losing Kichi, and spills all of his medicine. During another love-making session, Kichi invites Sada to strangle him again, telling her not to stop half-way this time, since it would be too painful afterwards. After killing him, Sada rubs her breasts against Kichi's face, attempts to feed him beer, and then castrates him. She then cuts herself and writes "Kichi Sada 2" with her blood on his body. During the progress of this scene, Sada's past life is told in flashbacks. She is banished from her wealthy family after losing her virginity to rape. She wanders around Japan working as a prostitute and bar-maid, eventually finding employment at the current inn where she met Kichi.

The final sequence has her crime discovered and becoming a national sensation. Sada, while discussing the story with a masseur who is unaware of her identity, says that Sada must have loved Kichi very much since she wanted the whole country to know about them. The film ends with Sada's arrest.

== Comparison with In the Realm of the Senses ==
Tanaka's version of the Sada Abe story is inevitably compared with Nagisa Oshima's internationally-known In the Realm of the Senses. The most obvious difference between the two is that Tanaka's film, intended for a Japanese audience, could not indulge in the hardcore elements that Oshima's version employed. As a result, Oshima's film, when shown in Japan, was censored, while Tanaka's version played as the director intended it. While Oshima limits his timeframe to the period of the final sexual encounter, Tanaka gives a more rounded portrayal of Abe's life through flashbacks.

While Oshima takes an objective, cool attitude towards the characters, Tanaka takes a warm approach to the subjects, concentrating on the passion between the two lovers. Set almost exclusively in the small room in the inn, Tanaka uses popular songs not only to set up situations, but also to express the emotions of the characters. Tanaka's skillful use of a variety of camera angles prevents the limited setting from becoming monotonous or claustrophobic. Both Oshima's and Tanaka's versions were highly regarded by critics in Japan, and both films were considered among the top ten releases for their years.

== Critical appraisal ==
Midnight Eye's review of A Woman Called Sada Abe compares it to In the Realm of the Senses, notes, "Aside from being less sexually explicit, it is also smaller scale, more intimate, more cinematically stylised and arguably more erotic."

A Woman Called Sada Abe is generally considered one of Nikkatsu's five best Roman porno films. Many Japanese critics consider it to be superior to Oshima's film, and Junko Miyashita is called a more realistic Sada Abe than Eiko Matsuda. Miyashita's performance has been judged one of the best of her career, and the film has been called director Tanaka's masterpiece.

A Woman Called Sada Abe was a major box-office success in Japan, and it has been suggested that the success of Tanaka's film caused Oshima to distribute his film internationally before releasing it in Japan. Along with the earlier Roman Porno film, Wife to be Sacrificed (1974), A Woman Called Sada Abe was released to an enthusiastic reception in San Francisco in 1998.

== Sources ==
- "実録阿部定 (Jitsuroku Sada Abe)" (in Japanese). Japanese Movie Database.
- Marran, Christine (2007). "Why Perversion Is Not Subversion: Tanaka Noboru's The True Story of Abe Sada and Oshima Nagisa's In the Realm of the Senses". Poison Woman: Figuring Female Transgression in Modern Japanese Culture. Minneapolis, MN: University of Minnesota Press. pp. 150–161. ISBN 978-0-8166-4727-9.
- Sharp, Jasper (20 March 2001). "The Sada Abe Story (review)". www.midnighteye.com. Archived from the original on 23 April 2007.
- Thompson, Bill (1985). "Jitsuroko [sic] Abe Sada". In Frank N. Magill (ed.). Magill's Survey of Cinema: Foreign Language Films; Volume 4. Englewood Cliffs, N.J.: Salem Press. pp. 1568–1573. ISBN 0-89356-243-2.
- Weisser, Thomas; Yuko Mihara Weisser (1998). Japanese Cinema Encyclopedia: The Sex Films. Miami: Vital Books : Asian Cult Cinema Publications. ISBN 1-889288-52-7.
