= Lovers Are Wet =

- Theatrical release poster
- Directed by: Tatsumi Kumashiro
- Written by: Tatsumi Kumashiro; Kōji Kamoda
- Starring: Rie Nakagawa; Tetsu Ōe
- Cinematography: Shinsaku Himeda
- Edited by: Osamu Inoue
- Music by: Tōru Ōe
- Distributed by: Nikkatsu
- Release date: March 24, 1973
- Running time: 76 minutes
- Country: Japan
- Language: Japanese

Lovers Are Wet (恋人たちは濡れた, Koibito-tachi wa nureta) is a 1973 Japanese film in Nikkatsu's Roman porno series, directed by Tatsumi Kumashiro and starring Rie Nakagawa. Alternate titles for the film include Twisted Path of Youth, Twisted Path of Love, and Lovers and Wet Sands. In 1999 the mainstream Japanese film journal Kinema Junpo named it as one of the best Japanese films of the 20th century.

== Synopsis ==
Katsu, a young man who has spent five years drifting around Japan, returns to his coastal village hometown hoping to restart his life. Though the villagers recognize him, he refuses to admit to his past identity. He sets about disrupting social conventions and engaging in sexual and violent affronts to decorum. A local girl befriends him.

== Cast ==
- Rie Nakagawa: Yoko
- Tetsu Ōe: Katsu
- Koichi Hori: Mitsuo
- Kunio Shimizu: Miura
- Moeko Ezawa: Yoshie
- Chiro Kei: Sachiko

== Critical appraisal ==
In their Japanese Cinema Encyclopedia: The Sex Films, the Weissers point out that while Kumashiro's The Woman with Red Hair (1979) is rightly praised as a masterpiece of softcore porn, Lovers Are Wet is not a lesser work, writing, "Both films are equally important in shaping Japan's lucrative pinku eiga market."

In his Behind the Pink Curtain: The Complete History of Japanese Sex Cinema, Jasper Sharp writes that, like Woods are Wet and The World of Geisha (both 1973), Lovers Are Wet is one of Kumashiro's indictments of the hypocrisy of censorship. As in these other films, Kumashiro uses the censors' tools purposely to ridicule the practice. In a scene in which a group of people play nude leapfrog on a beach, Kumashiro hides the actors' genitals by scratching the surface of the film, "creating a bizarre writhing spaghetti of lines." Film historian Donald Richie pointed out that the Japanese censors had used this method on nude audience members in the film Woodstock (1970). While these non-erotic nudes passed unnoticed in countries without such censorship, Richie notes of the Japanese version, "When the film was projected the distant strolling couples consequently seemed girdled with fireworks. Though this called instant attention to what the censors were presumably attempting to hide, the letter of the law had been observed and this result satisfies all censors everywhere."

== Availability ==
Lovers Are Wet was released on DVD in Japan on March 24, 2006, as part of Geneon's third wave of Nikkatsu Roman porno series. On March 23, 2010, Kino International released three Tatsumi Kumashiro films on DVD in the U.S. Along with Ichijo's Wet Lust (1972) and Yakuza Goddess: Lust and Honor (1973), they released Lovers Are Wet under the title Twisted Path of Love.

== Bibliography ==
=== English ===
- Koibito tachi wa nureta (1973) at IMDb
- "KOIBITO-TACHI WA NURETA". Complete Index to World Film.
- Sharp, Jasper (2008). Behind the Pink Curtain: The Complete History of Japanese Sex Cinema. Guildford: FAB Press. ISBN 978-1-903254-54-7.
- Weisser, Thomas; Yuko Mihara Weisser (1998). Japanese Cinema Encyclopedia: The Sex Films. Miami: Vital Books : Asian Cult Cinema Publications. ISBN 1-889288-52-7.
- UniJapan Film Quarterly v.15 n.3, July 1972, p. 27.

=== Japanese ===
- 恋人たちは濡れた(1973) (in Japanese). allcinema.net.
- 恋人たちは濡れた (in Japanese). Japanese Cinema Database (Agency for Cultural Affairs).
- 恋人たちは濡れた (in Japanese). Japanese Movie Database.
- 恋人たちは濡れた(邦画) (in Japanese). Kinema Junpo.
- 恋人たちは濡れた (in Japanese). www.nikkatsu-romanporno.com.
