= Eiko Matsuda =

Japanese actress (1952–2011)

- Born: 18 May 1952; Yokohama, Japan
- Died: 9 March 2011 (aged 58); Tokyo, Japan
- Occupation: Actress
- Years active: 1976–1982

Eiko Matsuda (松田暎子, Matsuda Eiko) (18 May 1952 – 9 March 2011) was a Japanese actress. She is best known for her performance as Sada Abe in In the Realm of the Senses. She also appeared in Seibo Kannon daibosatsu (1977) and Pinku saron: Kōshoku gonin onna (1978).

She died on 9 March 2011 of a brain tumor.

== Filmography ==
| Year | Title | Role | Notes |
|---|---|---|---|
| 1970 | Nora-neko rokku: Mashin animaru | Sarii | |
| 1970 | Jack no irezumi | | |
| 1976 | In the Realm of the Senses | Sada Abe | |
| 1977 | Ōoku ukiyo-buro | Okoyo | |
| 1977 | Doberuman deka | Kosode | |
| 1977 | Seibo Kannon daibosatsu | Yaobikuni | |
| 1978 | Pinku saron: Kôshoku gonin onna | Mitsu | |
| 1979 | Sochō no kubi | Ukiyo | |
| 1982 | Cinq et la peau | Mari | (final film role) |
