= The World of Geisha =

- Theatrical poster for The World of Geisha (1973)
- Directed by: Tatsumi Kumashiro
- Written by: Tatsumi Kumashiro (screenplay); Kafū Nagai (original novel)
- Starring: Junko Miyashita; Naomi Oka
- Cinematography: Shinsaku Himeda
- Edited by: Akira Suzuki
- Distributed by: Nikkatsu
- Release date: November 3, 1973
- Running time: 72 min.
- Country: Japan
- Language: Japanese

The World of Geisha (四畳半襖の裏張り, Yojōhan fusuma no urahari) a.k.a. A Man and a Woman Behind the Fusuma Screen is a 1973 Japanese film in Nikkatsu's Roman porno series, directed by Tatsumi Kumashiro and starring Junko Miyashita. The mainstream film journal Kinema Junpo included it in their choices for best ten films of the year of 1973.

== Synopsis ==
In 1918, against the background of political events following the Russo-Japanese War, a geisha serves a new customer. Though he is about to be married, and it is against the rules, she falls in love with him.

== Cast ==
- Junko Miyashita: Sodeko
- Naomi Ōka: Yuko
- Hideaki Ezumi: Shinsuke
- Hatsuo Yamaya: Pinsuke
- Go Awazu: Koichi
- Moeko Ezawa: Hanae
- Meika Seri: Hanamuru

== Critical reception ==
The World of Geisha was very successful with the public and critics in Japan. The mainstream film journal Kinema Junpo selected it as the 6th best Japanese film of 1973. In Currents in Japanese Cinema, Japanese film critic Tadao Sato describes the film as a "masterful porno film rich in emotion, anarchy, and nihilism." Director Nagisa Oshima took an opposite view of the film in a well-known essay written before his own In the Realm of the Senses (1976). Oshima called Kumashiro's film "a little too refined," and took it to task for failing to "realise the effect of pornography." Oshima complained about the Roman porno films that they took "sex as their subject matter and not as their theme. The themes of their most highly regarded films tend to be something like adolescent rebellion; sex is merely the seasoning." He concludes, this "is precisely why these films are attractive to superficial critics, and young film buffs."

Contemporary Western critics were also positive towards the film. A January 1974 Variety review noted that Kumashiro showed a "definitely savvy directorial flair", but that there was "(n)othing banal, or pretentious" about the film. Further, the "love scenes... are handled with wit and insight", and the "sex bouts... all have a rightness in tone." The review continues, "It is technically fine and ranks with some well-known costumers." "Right placement," Variety concludes, "could have this gaining some following abroad and not for its sex scenes but its feeling for period, time and mores and social outlooks that are reflected from the sensual rather than the social side of its characters." François Truffaut called The World of Geisha a "great movie," adding, "The acting is perfect, and the film is humorous. In its praise for female beauty and derision for male stupidity lies the generous spirit of Jean Renoir."

Later commentators on Japanese cinema continue to hold the film in high esteem. The Weissers, in their Japanese Cinema Encyclopedia: The Sex Films (1998) comment, "The structure of the film is its most interesting aspect. Director Kumashiro is playing intentional games with linear storytelling, creating a narrative which flows unhampered, unrestricted by time." In his Behind the Pink Curtain, Jasper Sharp calls The World of Geisha Kumashiro's "most articulate attack" against censorship and state-imposed morality.

== Themes and style ==
Kumashiro's screenplay was based on Kafū Nagai's Yojohan Fusuma No Shitabari, one of several erotic novels the author circulated underground after having been censored by the government in 1907. Kumashiro uses his simple, but complexly told, story to make a comment against censorship and militarism. One characteristic of Kumashiro's cinematic style which is present in The World of Geisha is the avoidance of sync sound through the use of titles. Titles can be used ironically in the film, as when the geisha house rules are presented, "No.1: Don't fall for your first client", while Sodeko can be seen obviously breaking that rule. Cutaways are another technique Kumashiro uses prominently in The World of Geisha. Most reviews of the film comment on the opening love-making session which lasts over one-third of the film's total running time. This long scene is intercut with subplots involving the other geishas and their clients. Kumashiro's usage of inserts contrasts with that of traditional directors such as Ozu. Inserts in an Ozu film have a calming and transitional purpose, whereas Kumashiro uses them to shock the audience while also, in The World of Geisha, providing historical context. Historical events used as inserts in The World of Geisha include the Korean uprisings, Russia's October Revolution, the Japanese Rice Riots of 1918, and a police order censoring the news of these riots.

Tadao Sato notes that the lead male character in the film, who has been raised in a brothel and is accustomed to the company of prostitutes, is a variation on the traditional nanpa character: an irresponsible type dedicated to sensual pleasures rather than hard work. Kumashiro, according to Satō, makes his characters sympathetic through their devotion to sensual pleasure. Kumashiro often used Eirin's form of censoring visual depictions of genitals – fogging – against itself in an exaggerated form, as satirical commentary. In The World of Geisha, he does this while also "censoring" titles, such as Sodeko's, "I'm coming again!!", which is marked out with "X"s, as were reports of Japanese casualties in Siberia in the Russian Civil War. By using these two forms of censorship in juxtaposition, Kumashiro draws a parallel between Taishō period censorship, and Eirin's, and the government's contemporary forms of censorship.

== Availability ==
The World of Geisha was released theatrically in Japan on November 3, 1973. Nikkatsu marketed the film to the English-speaking world with the ad, "The essence of the geisha world! The art of pleasing men! ...dainty butterflies... and how these colorful beauties entertain their diverse guests night after night to the strains of the three-stringed samisen."

The World of Geisha was re-released on DVD in Japan on December 22, 2006, as part of Geneon's sixth wave of Nikkatsu Roman porno series. In the U.S., The World of Geisha has been released on home video by both Image Entertainment and Kino.

== Bibliography ==
=== English ===
- Johnson, William (2003). "A New View of Porn: The Films of Tatsumi Kumashiro" (PDF). Film Quarterly, vol. 57, no.1, Fall 2003. University of California Press. pp. 11–19. Archived from the original (PDF) on March 4, 2007.
- Mosk. Yojohan Fusuma No Shitabari (film review). Variety, 1974-01-02.
- Sharp, Jasper (2008). Behind the Pink Curtain: The Complete History of Japanese Sex Cinema. Guildford: FAB Press. ISBN 978-1-903254-54-7.
- Weisser, Thomas; Yuko Mihara Weisser (1998). Japanese Cinema Encyclopedia: The Sex Films. Miami: Vital Books : Asian Cult Cinema Publications. ISBN 1-889288-52-7.
- Yojôhan fusuma no urabari (1973) at IMDb
- "YOJOHAN FUSUMA NO URABARI". Complete Index to World Film.

=== Japanese ===
- 四畳半襖の裏張り(1973) (in Japanese). allcinema.net.
- 四畳半襖の裏張り (in Japanese). Japanese Cinema Database (Agency for Cultural Affairs).
- 四畳半襖の裏張り (in Japanese). Japanese Movie Database.
- 四畳半襖の裏張り(邦画 ) (in Japanese). Kinema Junpo.
- 四畳半襖の裏張り (in Japanese). www.nikkatsu-romanporno.com.
