= Junko Miyashita =

Japanese actress (born 1949)

- Born: January 29, 1949 (age 77); Tokyo, Japan
- Years active: 1971–present
- Spouse: None

Junko Miyashita (宮下順子, Miyashita Junko; born 29 January 1949) is a Japanese actress who had a long and varied career working both in pink film and mainstream cinema.

== Career ==
Junko Miyashita was born in Tokyo on January 29, 1949. She was working as a waitress at a coffee shop when she was recruited to work in Pink films. Her debut film was in July 1971 with That's How I Lost (私はこうして失った). Her work in Nikkatsu's Roman Porno genre included eight entries in the Apartment Wife series from 1972 until 1974. She worked with leading pink film director Kōji Wakamatsu, and some of the best directors in Nikkatsu's Roman Porno films, including Noboru Tanaka, and Tatsumi Kumashiro. Among the highlights of her early career were starring roles in Tanaka's Showa Trilogy (A Woman Called Sada Abe (1975), Watcher in the Attic (1976), and Beauty's Exotic Dance: Torture! (1977)). An exceptionally good actress for the genre, she was nominated for a Japanese Academy Award for best new actress in her roles in Kihachi Okamoto's film Dynamite Bang Bang and Hideo Gosha's Bandit vs. Samurai Squad (both 1978). She was awarded the Blue Ribbon Award for both of these roles. She was again nominated for a Japanese Academy Award in 1979 for best actress for her role in Woman with Red Hair, and won the Hochi News award for both this role and for Wet Weekend. The following year, she was given a special award for her career at the Yokohama Film Festival.

From the 1980s, she began working more in mainstream films, including two award-winning films for Mitsuo Yanagimachi: Fire Festival (Himatsuri) (1985) and About Love, Tokyo (Ai ni tsuite, Tokyo) (1992). Commenting on his work with Miyashita, director Noboru Tanaka later said, "I liked her natural manner. She always looks very natural, but you can feel the great power and strength that she has. She had a very traditional and conservative Japanese style, but her determination could be seen on the screen... she was a traditional Japanese beauty who also had energy and strength, and that was what I liked about her."

== Filmography ==
=== 1970s ===
- 私はこうして失った (葵映画) (7/1971)
- 女紋交悦 (葵映画) (9/1971)
- 性の求道者 (World Films) (10/1971)
- セックスNo．1 (Million Film) (12/1971)
- 女体貸します (関東ムービー) (12/1971)
- Sex Family (性家族, Sei Kazoku) (Wakamatsu Films) (12/1971)
- (日本姦通風俗史) (Million Film) (1/1972)
- (強烈！性を好む女) (World Films) (1/1972)
- (幼い性と熟した性) (World Films) (2/1972)
- (続・ニッポン発情地帯) (葵映画) (2/1972)
- (セックス・ゲリラ) (大東映画) (2/1972)
- (夫婦ごっこ) (Million Film) (3/1972)
- (淫魔) (大蔵映画) (3/1972)
- (女くらべ寝室日記) (Million Film) (4/1972)
- (性と生活 ネオン裏の25時) (Million Film) (4/1972)
- (けだもの美女) (World Films) (5/1972)
- (婦女暴行脱走犯) (葵映画) (5/1972)
- (男・女のセックス処理) (大蔵映画) (5/1972)
- (入浴は情事の前に) (Million Film) (6/1972)
- Apartment Wife: Unforgettable Night (団地妻 忘れ得ぬ夜, Danchizuma Wasureenu Yoru) (Nikkatsu) (7/8/1972)
- (艶技の極致) (大東映画) (7/1972)
- (情婦 - Jofu) (Nikkatsu) (8/26/1972) (two roles)
- やり逃げ専科) (関東ムービー) (8/1972)
- (影狩り ほえろ大砲 - Kage Gari: Hoero Taihô) (石原プロ) (10/10/1972)
- (団地妻 女ざかり - Danchizuma Onna-Zakari) (Nikkatsu) (10/28/1972)
- (（秘）高校生の性生活) (Wakamatsu Productions) (11/7/1972)
- Afternoon Affair: Rear Window (昼下がりの情事 裏窓, Hirusagari no Joji: Uramado) (Nikkatsu) (11/18/1972)
- (OL日記 牝猫の情事 - OL Nikki Mesuneko no Joji) (Nikkatsu) (12/16/1972)
- Office Lady Journal: Poaching (OL Nikki: Mitsuryo) (1972)
- (団地妻 奪われた夜 - Danchizuma Ubawareta Yoru) (Nikkatsu) (1/13/1973
- (日本猟奇事件) (東京興映) (1/1973)
- (熟れすぎた乳房 人妻 - Uresugita Chibusa: Hitozuma) (Nikkatsu) (2/3/1973)
- (（秘）大奥外伝 尼寺淫の門 - Maruhi Ooku Gaiden Amadera In no Mon) (Nikkatsu) (2/211973)
- (実録白川和子 裸の履歴書 - Jitsuroku Kazuko Shirakawa: Hadaka no Rirekisho) (Nikkatsu) (2/21/1973) (cameo)
- (団地妻 歓喜の夜 - Danchizuma Kanki no Yoru) (Nikkatsu) (3/14/1973)
- Afternoon Affair: Kyoto Holy Tapestry (昼下りの情事 古都曼陀羅, Hirusagari no Joji Koto-Mandara) (Nikkatsu) (4/4/1973)
- Apartment Wife: Scent of a Woman (団地妻 女の匂い, Danchizuma Onna no Nioi) (Nikkatsu) (4/14/1973)
- (（秘）温泉穴場さがし) (Nikkatsu) (5/5/1973)
- Love Affair on Rainy Night (雨の夜の情事, Ame no Yo No Joji) (Nikkatsu) (5/23/1973)
- (（秘）穴場情報 牝馬の吐息) (Nikkatsu) (6/13/1973)
- Apartment Wife: Playing with Fire (団地妻 火遊び, Danchizuma: Hiasobi) (Nikkatsu) (7/4/1973)
- (愛に濡れたわたし - Ai ni Nureta Watashi) (Nikkatsu) (7/25/1973)
- Erotic Journey: Love Affair in Hong Kong (色情旅行 香港慕情, Shikijo Ryoko: Hong Kong Bojo) (Nikkatsu) (8/4/1973)
- Sex Report From a Female Private Detective: Housewife Prostitution (女調査員SEXレポート, Onna Chosain Sex Report: Shufu Baishun) (Nikkatsu) (8/15/1973)
- Legend of Sex Thief in Edo (大江戸性盗伝 －女斬り－, Ōedo Seito-Den Onnagiri) (Nikkatsu) (9/12/1973)
- (さすらいかもめ －釧路の夜 - Sasurai Kamome: Kushiro no Yoru) (Nikkatsu) (10/05/1973)
- Married Woman: Smoldering Fire (人妻－残り火, Hitozuma: Nokoribi) (Nikkatsu) (10/24/1973)
- The World of Geisha (四畳半襖の裏張り, Yojōhan fusuma no urahari) (Nikkatsu) (11/3/1973)
- (OL日記 密漁 あさる - OL Nikki Mitsuryo: Asaru) (Nikkatsu) (12/5/1973)
- The Vanity of the Shogun's Mistress (大奥秘話 晴姿姫ごと絵巻, Ooku Hiwa Haresugata Himegoto-Emaki) (Nikkatsu) (1/3/1974)
- Apartment Wife: Afternoon Seduction (団地妻 昼下りの誘惑, Danchizuma: Hirusagari no Yuuwaku) (Nikkatsu) (1/15/1974)
- Man & Woman Behind Fusuma Screen II / Man & Woman Behind Fusuma Screen: Enduring Skin (四畳半襖の裏張り しのび肌, Yojohan Fusuma no Urabari: Shinobi Hada) (Nikkatsu) (2/16/1974)
- Sukeban Deka: Dirty Mary (すけばん刑事 ダーティ・マリー, Sukeban Deka: Daati Marii) (Nikkatsu) (4/20/1974)
- Last Day of Red Light District: March 31, 1958 (赤線最後の日 昭和33年3月31日, Akasen Saigo no Hi: Showa 33-nen 3-gatsu 31-nichi) (Nikkatsu) (6/22/1974)
- Secret Book series: Turbulent Cloud (秘本 乱れ雲, Hihon: Mideregumo) (Nikkatsu) (7/6/1974)
- New Apartment Wife: Afternoon Beast (新・団地妻 けものの昼下り, Shin Danchizuma: Kemono no Hirusagari) (Nikkatsu) (7/20/1974)
- Female Ninja Magic: 100 Trampled Flowers (くノ一淫法 百花卍がらみ, Kunoichi Inpo: Hyakka Manji-Garimi) (Nikkatsu) (8/3/1974)
- Secret Chronicle: She-Beast Market (（秘）色情めす市場, Maruhi - Shikijo mesu ichiba) (Nikkatsu) (9/11/1974)
- Street of Joy / Red Light District: Gonna Get Out (赤線玉の井 ぬけられます, Akasen Tamanoi: Nukeraremasu) (Nikkatsu) (9/21/1974)
- Secret Book: Sleeve and Sleeve (秘本 袖と袖, Hihon: Sode to Sode) (10/26/1974)
- Secret Book: Peeled Egg (秘本むき玉子, Hihon: Muki Tamago) (1/14/1975)
- A Woman Called Sada Abe / Sada Abe: Docu-Drama (実録阿部定, Jitsuroku Abe Sada) (Nikkatsu) (2/8/1975)
- Housewife's Experience: Tenement Apartment (主婦の体験レポート おんなの四畳半, Shufu no Taiden Report: Onna no Yo-jo-han) (Nikkatsu) (4/26/1975)
- Housewife's Experience: The Sequel (主婦の体験レポート 続おんなの四畳半, Shufu no Taiken Report: Zoku Onna no Yo-jo-han) (Nikkatsu) (7/23/1975)
- (日本ポルノ史 濡れ場活動大写真) (Shintōhō Eiga) (7/1975)
- Office Lady Journal: Indecent Relations (OL日記 猥褻な関係, OL Nikki Waisetsuna Kankei) (Nikkatsu) (9/6/1975)
- Lady Kamakura: Cherry Boy Club (鎌倉夫人 童貞倶楽部, Kamakura Fujin: Dotei Club) (Nikkatsu) (9/20/1975)
- (ポルノ事件簿 性の暗黒) (Shintōhō Eiga) (9/1975)
- Great Edo: Secret Story of a Female Doctor in Trouble (大江戸 （秘）おんな医者あらし, Ohedo: Maruki Onna Isha Arashi) (Nikkatsu) (10/18/1975)
- Housewife's Experience: New Tenement (主婦の体験レポート 新・おんなの四畳半, Shufu no Taiken Report: Shin Onna No Yo-jo-han) (Nikkatsu) (12/24/1975)
- Documentary on High School Girls Prostitution Ring (Jitsuroku Jokosei Shudan Baishun) (Wakamatsu Films) (1975)
- Competition: Married Couples Technique (夫婦秘戯くらべ, Fufu Higi Kurabe) (2/21/1976)
- (太陽は泣かない ) (日本福祉映画協会) (3/15/1976)
- Cage of Lust: Wives' Afternoon (「妻たちの午後」より 官能の檻, Tsumatachi no Gogo wa Yori: Kano no Ori) (Nikkatsu) (5/1/1976)
- Watcher in the Attic (江戸川乱歩猟奇館 屋根裏の散歩者, Edogawa Rampo Ryoki-Kan: Yaneura no Sanpo Sha) (Nikkatsu) (6/12/1976)
- Getting Raped (犯される, Okasareru) (Nikkatsu) (7/31/1976)
- (嗚呼！！花の応援団 - Ah!! Hana no Oh-Endan) (8/21/1976)
- (東京秘密ホテル けものの戯れ - Tokyo Himitsu Hotel: Kemono no Tawamure) (Nikkatsu) (10/20/1976)
- Student Mistress: Taste of a Virgin (学生情婦 処女の味, Gakusei Mabu: Shojo no Aji) (Nikkatsu) (11/27/1976)
- (嗚呼！！花の応援団 役者やのォー - Ah!! Hana no Oh-Endan: Yakusha Ya Noh) (Nikkatsu) (12/25/1976)
- Tissue Paper by the Geisha's Pillow (四畳半芸者の枕紙, Yo-jo-han Geisha no Makuragami) (Nikkatsu) (1/22/1977)
- The Alaska Story (アラスカ物語, Arasuka Monogatari) (東京映画) (1/22/1977)
- Beauty's Exotic Dance: Torture! (発禁本「美人乱舞」より 責める！, Hakkinbon Bijin Ranbu Yori: Semeru!) (Nikkatsu) (2/23/1977)
- (不連続殺人事件 - Furenzoku Satsujin Jiken) (タツミキカク=ATG) (3/15/1977)
- (嗚呼！！花の応援団 男涙の親衛隊 - Ah!! Hana no Oh-Endan: Otoko Namida no Shineitai) (Nikkatsu) (3/19/1977)
- Dannoura Pillow War (壇の浦夜枕合戦記, Dannoura Yomakura Kassenki) (Nikkatsu) (4/23/1977)
- Wet and Crying (中山あい子「未亡人学校」より 濡れて泣く, Nakayama Aiko 'Mibôjin Gakko' Yori: Nurete Naku) (Nikkatsu) (5/21/1977)
- Showtime! (「市井」より 本番, Shisei Yori: Honban) (6/25/1977)
- Apartment Wife: Rainy Day Affair (団地妻 雨やどりの情事, Danchizuma Amayadori no Joji) (7/23/1977)
- (昼下りの情事 すすり泣き - Hirusagari no Joji: Susurinaki) (10/15/1977)
- Gate of Flesh (肉体の門, Nikutai no Mon) (12/24/1977)
- Teacher's Mark Card (Sensei no Tsushinbo) (1977)
- Tenement Apartment: Obscene Affair (四畳半 猥褻な情事, Yo-jo-han: Waisetsuna Joji) (1/21/1978)
- Junko's Bliss (順子わななく, Junko Wananaku) (Nikkatsu) (3/4/1978)
- Bandit vs. Samurai Squad / Bandits vs. Samurai Squadron (雲霧仁左衛門, Kumokiri Nizaemon) (Shochiku=俳優座) (7/1/1978)
- Panic in High School (高校大パニック, Koko dai Panikku) (8/19/1978)
- Dynamite Bang Bang (ダイナマイトどんどん, Dainamaito Dondon) (大映映画) (10/7/1978)
- (博多っ子純情 - Hakatakko Junjô) (エル・アイ・エル) (12/2/1978)
- Woman's Bedroom: Lusty Competition (おんなの寝室 好きくらべ, Onna no Shinshitsu: Sukikurabe) (Nikkatsu) (12/23/1978)
- The Woman with Red Hair (赫い髪の女, Akai Kami no Onna) (Nikkatsu) (2/17/1979)
- (禁じられた体験 - Kinjirareta Taiken) (Nikkatsu) (3/17/1979)
- Rope and Skin (団鬼六 縄と肌, Dan Oniroku Nawa to Hada) (Nikkatsu) (7/21/1979)
- Wet Weekend (濡れた週末, Nureta Shumatsu) (Nikkatsu) (9/22/1979)
- Faraway Tomorrow (遠い明日, Tooi Ashita) (東宝映画) (11/3/1979)
- Hell Worms (地獄の蟲, Jigoku no Mushi) (マツダ映画) (12/1/1979)
- The Golden Dog (黄金の犬, Ôgon no Inu) (1979)

=== 1980s ===
- (きらめきの季節) (共同映画=青銅プロ) (2/16/1980)
- Bad Sorts (わるいやつら, Warui Yatsura) (Shochiku=霧プロ) (6/28/1980)
- Koichiro Uno's Shell Competition (Uno Koichiro no Kaikurabe) (7/19/1980)
- (お母さんのつうしんぼ) (Nikkatsu) (10/18/1980)
- Pleasure Campus: Secret Games (快楽学園 禁じられた遊び, Kairaku Gakuen: Kinjirareta Asobi) (Nikkatsu) (11/21/1980)
- (仕掛人梅安 - Shikake-nin Baian) (Toei) (4/11/1981)
- (ダンプ渡り鳥 - Danpu Wataridori) (Toei) (4/29/1981)
- (真夜中の招待状 - Mayonaka no Shôtaijô) (Shochiku) (9/26/1981)
- Island of the Evil Spirits (悪霊島, Akuryo-To) (角川春樹事務所) (10/3/1981)
- (とりたての輝き - Toritate no Kagayaki) (Toei) (10/10/1981)
- Ekisutora (1982)
- The Living Koheiji (怪異談 生きてゐる小平次, Kaiidan: Ikiteiru Koheiji) (磯田事務所・ATG) (9/4/1982)
- (父と子 - Chichi to Ko) (サンリオ) (1/15/1983)
- Namidabashi (1983)
- (十階のモスキート - Jukkai no Mosquito) (ニュー・センチュリー・プロデューサーズ) (7/2/1983)
- Mermaid Legend (人魚伝説, Ningyo Densetsu) (ディレクターズ・カンパニー=ATG) (4/14/1984)
- (ときめき海岸物語) (Shochiku) (8/4/1984)
- Fire Festival (火まつり, Himatsuri) (西武セゾングループ=シネセゾン=プロダク) (5/25/1985)
- Tracked (薄化粧, Usugesho) (Shochiku=五社プロ=映像京都) (10/26/1985)
- (魔の刻 - Ma no Toki) (1985)
- (友よ、静かに瞑れ - Tomo yo Shizukani Nemure) (1985)
- Early Spring Story (早春物語, Soushun Monogatari) (1985)
- (恋人たちの時刻 - Koibitotachino Jikoku) (角川春樹事務所) (3/14/1987)
- Magino Village: A Tale (1000年刻みの日時計, 1000-nen Kizami no Hidokei) (牧野村物語 小川プロ) (12/1/1987)
- Shinran: Path to Purity (親鸞 白い道, Shinran: Shiroi Michi) (1987)
- Lady Camellia or Princess Tsubuki (椿姫, Tsubaki Hime) (1988)
- (文学賞殺人事件 大いなる助走 - Bungakusho Satsujin Jiken: Oinaru Joso) (アジャックス) (1/28/1989)
- A Festival of Dreams (夢の祭り, Yume no Matsuri) (フジテレビジョン=ヘラルド・エース) (6/24/1989)

=== 1990s ===
- (悪人専用) (Toei Video) (12/14/1990)
- (遺産相続 - Isan Sôzoku) (1990)
- Skinless Night (スキンレスナイト) (イースタッフユニオン) (4/6/1991)
- Scorpion Woman Prisoner: Death Threat (女囚さそり 殺人予告, Joshuu Sasori: Satsujin Yokoku) (Toei Video) (5/17/1991)
- About Love, Tokyo (愛について、東京 「愛について、東京」, Ai ni Tsuite, Tokyo) (製作委員会) (2/19/1993)
- Alone in the Night (夜がまた来る, Yoru ga Mata Kuru) (ビデオチャチャンプ=キングレコード=テレ) (10/22/1994)
- Female Teacher's Diary: Forbidden Sex (女教師日記 禁じられた性, Jokyoshi Nikki: Kinjirareta Sei) (Toei Video) (9/8/1995)
- (嗚呼！！花の応援団 「嗚呼！！花の応援団」製作実行委員会) (11/9/1996)
- (MUSASHI) イーハーフィルムズ=プロT&N) (11/3/1996)
- (虹をつかむ男 - Niji o Tsukamu Otoko) (Shochiku) (12/28/1996)
- (平成極道伝 外道は殺れ！) (Toei Video) (2/14/1997)
- (新サラリーマン専科 - Shin Sarariiman Senka) (Shochiku=アミューズ) (11/22/1997)
- Zakuro Yakata (1997)
- (イーストサイドワルツ 悦楽の園) (Toei Video) (6/12/1998)
- (第七官界彷徨 尾崎翠を探して - Dai-Nana Kankai Hoko: Osaki Midori o Sagashite) (旦々舎=「第七官界彷徨 尾崎翠を探して」) (7/3/1999)

=== 2000s ===
- (守ってあげたい！ 「守ってあげたい！」 - Mamotte Agetai) (製作委員会) (3/4/2000)
- Kamome (Kamome) (映像塾プロジェクト) (3/4/2000)
- Closed Ward (いのちの海, Inochi no Umi) (2000)
- (白い船 「白い船」製作委員会) (7/6/2002)
- (美しい夏キリシマ キリシマ1945) (12/14/2002)
- (デコトラの鷲) (オフィスサンヨー) (10/13/2003)
- (デコトラの鷲 会津・喜多方・人情街道！) (オフィスサンヨー企画) (10/2/2004)
- Sea Cat (海猫, Umineko) (製作委員会) (11/13/2004)
- A Boy's Summer in 1945 (美しい夏キリシマ キリシマ1945, Utsukushii Natsu Kirishima) (12/14/2002)
- Portrait of the Wind (誰がために, Taga Tameni) (2005)
- Dekotora no Shu: Koino Hanasaku Shimizuko (デコトラの鷲: 恋の花咲く清水港) (2006)
- One Night in Ruder
- Dekotora no shu: Hinokuni kumamoto (デコトラの鷲（しゅう） 其の五 火の国熊本親子特急便) (June 2008)

=== 2010s ===
- Maestro! (2015)
- Dangerous Cops: Final 5 Days (2016)

=== 2020s ===
- The Voice of Sin (2020)
- The Stars and Moon are Holes in the Sky (2025)

== Sources ==
- "JUNKO MIYASHITA". The Complete Index to World Film.
- Junko Miyashita at IMDb
- "Junko Miyashita (profile)". Urabon Navigator 1997-2006.
- "宮下順子 Miyashita Junko" (in Japanese). Japanese Movie Database.
- 宮下順子 （ミヤシタジュンコ） at movie.goo.ne.jp (in Japanese)
- "宮下順子のプロフィール Miyashita Junko Profile". Yahoo! (in Japanese).
- Saotome, Hiromi (2006-03-10). "売りはデカダン*宮下順子 ("Selling Decadence: Junko Miyashita"". ロマンポルノ女優 [Roman Porno Actresses] (in Japanese). Tokyo: Kawade Shobo Shinsha, Publishers. pp. 26–34. ISBN 4-309-48156-6.
- Weisser, Thomas; Yuko Mihara Weisser (1998). Japanese Cinema Encyclopedia: The Sex Films. Miami: Vital Books : Asian Cult Cinema Publications. ISBN 1-889288-52-7.
- "Report on the Success of the 'Roman Porno for Women Special Collection': Junko Miyashita and Akane Shiratori Speak, Heat of the Nikkatsu Roman Porno" (in Japanese). www.walkerplus.com. 2007-03-30. Archived from the original on 2009-01-03.
