= Front Row Life =

- Theatrical poster
- Directed by: Tatsumi Kumashiro
- Written by: Tatsumi Kumashiro
- Starring: Hatsue Tonooka
- Cinematography: Shinsaku Himeda
- Edited by: Akira Suzuki
- Music by: Riichiro Manabe
- Distributed by: Nikkatsu
- Release date: April 13, 1968
- Running time: 94 min.
- Country: Japan
- Language: Japanese

Front Row Life (かぶりつき人生, Kaburitsuki jinsei) a.k.a. Fan Life, Front Row, A Thirsty Life and Life of a Striptease Love is a 1968 Japanese film directed by Tatsumi Kumashiro. The Roman Porno director's first film, it was a box-office failure, and stalled his directing career until 1972.

== Synopsis ==
Based on the 1964 novel of the same name by Komimasa Tanaka, the film tells the story of a strip-teaser, and her daughter who wishes to join her mother's profession.

== Cast ==
- Hatsue Tonooka: 笑子
- Shizu Niwa (aka Shizu Tanba): 洋子
- Shuntaro Tamamura: 勝チン
- Yoshihiro Nakadai: 坂本っちゃん
- Hiroko Hanae: 秋子
- Yukimasa Natori: 恭やん
- Masanori Nagase: 倉さん
- Tatsuo Mizuki: ふとん屋
- Hiroshi Ichimura: 若いやくざ
- Takeshi Yoshida: 錦ちゃん
- Hisako Nitta
- Bonji Masuda

== Production ==
Tatsumi Kumashiro had been working at Nikkatsu as an assistant director and screenwriter when he was given his first chance to direct, at the age of 41. Front Row Life gained positive reviews from critics, but was not popular with the public. As a result of the film's failure, Nikkatsu returned Kumashiro to assistant directing and scripting. Kumashiro was given his second chance to direct in 1972 after the studio had decided to take over the pink film genre by devoting its resources almost entirely to the output of Roman Porno films. This second film, Wet Lips was a success, and Kumashiro's string of pink blockbusters, which lasted over two-decades, had begun. Kumashiro and leading lady Hatsue Tonooka were married the year the film was released, but were divorced after only a few months.

== Bibliography ==
=== English ===
- Fentone, Steve (1998). "A Rip of the Flesh: The Japanese 'Pink Film' Cycle". She. 2 (11): 13.
- Kaburitsuki jinsei (1968) at IMDb
- "KABURITSUKI JINSEI". Complete Index to World Film.
- Sharp, Jasper (2008). Behind the Pink Curtain: The Complete History of Japanese Sex Cinema. Guildford: FAB Press. pp. 137, 349. ISBN 978-1-903254-54-7.
- Weisser, Thomas; Yuko Mihara Weisser (1998). Japanese Cinema Encyclopedia: The Sex Films. Miami: Vital Books : Asian Cult Cinema Publications. pp. 137–138. ISBN 1-889288-52-7.

=== Japanese ===
- かぶりつき人生(1968) (in Japanese). allcinema.net.
- かぶりつき人生 (in Japanese). Japanese Movie Database.
- "Variety Japan" かぶりつき人生 (in Japanese). Variety Japan.
- かぶりつき人生 (in Japanese). www.walkerplus.com. Archived from the original on 2005-03-19.
