= Woman on the Night Train =

- Theatrical poster for Woman on the Night Train (1972)
- Directed by: Noboru Tanaka
- Written by: Norio Miyashita
- Starring: Mari Tanaka; Keiko Tsuzuki; Tomoko Katsura
- Cinematography: Yoshihiro Yamazaki
- Edited by: Akira Suzuki
- Music by: Kōichi Sakata
- Distributed by: Nikkatsu
- Release date: July 19, 1972
- Running time: 71 minutes
- Country: Japan
- Language: Japanese

Woman on the Night Train (夜汽車の女, Yogisha no Onna) aka Night Train Woman is a 1972 Japanese film in Nikkatsu's Roman porno series, directed by Noboru Tanaka and starring Mari Tanaka.

== Synopsis ==
Saeko is abnormally attached to her older sister, Yumi. When Yumi becomes engaged to Arikawa, Saeko schemes to separate the two. She seduces Arikawa who then becomes confused over his attraction to both sisters. He approaches their father about his dilemma. The father explains that the two are actually half-sisters, Saeko being the result of his affair with Tomoko, a family maid. After Arikawa explains this to the sisters, Saeko's obsession with Yumi seems to end. However, when Yumi and Arikawa leave for a vacation together, Saeko follows them on the night train. When she catches up to them, she kills her sister with a razor blade and then kills herself.

== Cast ==
- Mari Tanaka (田中真理) as Saeko Mizuki
- Keiko Tsuzuki (続圭子) as Yumi Mizuki
- Tomoko Katsura (桂知子) as Hiroko
- Kibaji Tankoba (丹古母鬼馬二) as Okajima
- Akemi Yamaguchi (山口明美) as Mika
- Keisuke Yukioka (雪丘恵介) as Hajime Mizuki
- Toshihiko Oda (織田俊彦) as Yōji Arikawa
- Hidetoshi Kageyama (影山英俊) as Gorō
- Hiroyuki Mikawa (三川裕之) as Kishibe

== Critical appraisal ==
During Woman on the Night Train's Japanese critics noted the influence of European filmmakers on Tanaka's style. The use of metaphor and symbolism in the film was said to be similar to some of Roger Vadim's films. Luis Buñuel's Diary of a Chambermaid (1964), and Octave Mirbeau's original novel were said to be particular influences on Woman on the Night Train.

In their Japanese Cinema Encyclopedia: The Sex Films, Thomas and Yuko Mihara Weisser give Woman on the Night Train a rating of three out of four stars. They judge the film's weakness to be the rambling and far-fetched plot, but they write that this is compensated for by Tanaka's visuals and camera work, which they call, "some of the best in any pink film". They also note the welcome influence of French cinema on Tanaka's style. They single out the flashback scene in which the father seduces the maid as indicative of Tanaka's visual flair. Rather than staging the scene in a mundane bedroom setting, Tanaka makes the seduction more shocking by filming it among the stuffy, professorial father's books and papers in his study.

Allmovie judges Woman on the Night Train "memorable", "[s]tylish and absorbing", and one of Nikkatsu's best entries in the softcore genre of this period. They note that this film set a high standard against which Tanaka's later work often seemed lesser in comparison.

== Availability ==
Woman on the Night Train was released theatrically in Japan on July 19, 1972. It was released on DVD in Japan on September 22, 2006 as part of Geneon's fifth wave of Nikkatsu Roman porno series.

== Bibliography ==
=== English ===
- "YOGISHA NO ONNA". Complete Index to World Film.
- Yogisha no onna (1972) at IMDb
- Sharp, Jasper (2008). Behind the Pink Curtain: The Complete History of Japanese Sex Cinema. Guildford: FAB Press. pp. 134, 363. ISBN 978-1-903254-54-7.
- Weisser, Thomas; Yuko Mihara Weisser (1998). Japanese Cinema Encyclopedia: The Sex Films. Miami: Vital Books : Asian Cult Cinema Publications. pp. 511–512. ISBN 1-889288-52-7.

=== Japanese ===
- 夜汽車の女(1972) (in Japanese). allcinema.net.
- 夜汽車の女 (in Japanese). Japanese Cinema Database (Agency for Cultural Affairs).
- 夜汽車の女 (in Japanese). Japanese Movie Database.
- 夜汽車の女(邦画 ) (in Japanese). Kinema Junpo.
