= Tatsumi Kumashiro =

Japanese film director (1927–1995)

- Born: April 24, 1927; Saga, Kyūshū, Japan
- Died: February 24, 1995 (aged 67)
- Occupations: Film director; screenwriter
- Years active: 1972–1995

Tatsumi Kumashiro (Kumashiro Tatsumi (神代 辰巳); 24 April 1927 – 24 February 1995) was a Japanese film director and screenwriter known for his critically acclaimed, award-winning Roman Porno films.

Kumashiro was the most highly acclaimed director of the early Nikkatsu Roman Porno era, with many box-office successes, and films regularly appearing on the yearly Best Ten lists of the mainstream Kinema Junpo and Eiga Geijutsu film journals. Notable films include Ichijo's Wet Lust (1972) and The Woman with Red Hair (1979). Kumashiro has been called, "the most consistently successful director in Japan's cinematic history," and Allmovie calls him, "the most important Japanese director to emerge during the 1970s."

== Life and career ==
=== Early life ===
Tatsumi Kumashiro was born on April 24, 1927, in Saga, on Kyūshū—the southernmost of Japan's four main islands. His father was a pharmaceuticals merchant and judo master descended from the samurai class. A strict disciplinarian, Kumashiro's father believed in the warrior philosophy of Yamamoto Tsunetomo as written in Hagakure and supported Japan's military exploits of the 1930s and 1940s. Early in life Kumashiro rebelled against this upbringing by immersing himself in film and Western literature. During World War II, Kumashiro entered medical school as a means of avoiding the draft, but dropped out as soon as the war ended in Japan's defeat. He studied English literature at Waseda University, but, deciding he could not make a living writing novels, entered Shochiku studio as an assistant director in 1952, and moved to Nikkatsu in 1955.

Kumashiro worked as an assistant director and screenwriter until he was finally given a chance to direct in 1968. His debut film, Front Row Life, told the story of a stripper and her daughter who wished to join her mother's profession. The star of the movie, Hatsue Tonooka, became Kumashiro's wife later in the year, though the marriage ended in divorce within a few months. Front Row Life anticipated Kumashiro's later career in its focus on striptease performers. The film was a critical success, but because it failed at the box-office Nikkatsu put Kumashiro's directing career on hold again.

=== Directorial success ===
"My films are about people not biology."
-- Tatsumi Kumashiro

In 1971, facing bankruptcy due to a loss of their audience to television, Nikkatsu decided to devote its facilities almost exclusively to theatrical soft-core pornography. Several directors, not wishing to work in pornography, left the studio, opening up vacant positions.

Nikkatsu gave its Roman porno directors a great deal of artistic freedom in their films, as long as they met the official minimum quota of four nude or sex scenes per hour. In this environment, at the age of 44, Kumashiro was given his second chance to direct. Though his later films took full advantage of Nikkatsu's lenient policies by experimenting with cinematic time and space in an almost surreal manner, his first Roman porno, Wet Lips (Nureta Kuchibiru) (1972), was fairly simplistic. However, this story of a prostitute and her lover on the run after killing her pimp proved to be a major critical and box-office success, and established Kumashiro's directorial career. Wet Lips was also the first of Kumashiro's many films to use the word "Wet" (nureta) in the title.

His next film, Ichijo's Wet Lust (1972) was another hit with the critics and the public. Japan's most famous sex performer of the time, Sayuri Ichijō, played the title role for which she won the important Kinema Jumpo prize for best actress. Accepting the best director and best script awards at the same ceremony, Kumashiro commented, "If I can shoot what I like without the pressure of how it will turn out, I am motivated."

=== Mid career ===
For the next 20 years, Kumashiro directed a string of financial and critical hits unprecedented in Japanese cinematic history, completing ten films in 1972 and 1973 alone. His prolific and successful career during these years earned him the title, "King of Nikkatsu Roman porno" Contrasting him with more mainstream filmmakers like Nagisa Oshima, who sometimes make use of pornographic elements in their films, Film Quarterly’s New York editor, William Johnson calls Kumashiro, "an indisputable maker of screen porn whose films also deserve 'serious' interest." Kumashiro's work was noted for its humanistic themes and for its sympathetic treatment of its characters. Stylistically, his films were experimental, using a variety of avant-garde cinematic devices, and complex narrative structure.

Woods are Wet: Woman Hell (1973) was an adaptation of the Marquis de Sade's Justine (1791). Jasper Sharp writes that Kumashiro uses de Sade's story as a platform for criticizing morality imposed by power, with particular relevance to the censorship trial Nikkatsu was undergoing at the time with the prosecution of Love Hunter (1972). Underlying this theme, common in Kumashiro's work, Kumashiro has one of his characters say, "What you accept as ethical is contrived by those in authority so they can control people." Kumashiro also employs censorship as one of the stylistic devices of the film, exaggerating the fogging required by Japanese law by placing black blocks over large areas of the screen.

Lovers Are Wet and The World of Geisha (both 1973) were two more films in which Kumashiro similarly used the censor's tools to make an anti-censorship statement. François Truffaut called The World of Geisha (1973) a "great movie," adding, "The acting is perfect, and the film is humorous. In its praise for female beauty and derision for male stupidity lies the generous spirit of Jean Renoir." Street of Joy a.k.a. Red Light District: Gonna Get Out (1974), employing the same setting as Mizoguchi's Street of Shame (1956), illustrates Kumashiro's common use of devices such as internal animated sequences to situate characters, and enka songs to comment on the action.

Kumashiro's 1974 film, Man and Woman Behind the Fusuma Screen: Enduring Skin starred Nikkatsu's reigning Roman porno Queen, Junko Miyashita. Movie critic Tadao Sato called the film "a masterful porno film rich in emotion, anarchy, and nihilism." Junko Miyashita won the Hochi News award for best actress of 1979 after starring in Kumashiro's The Woman with Red Hair, which the Weissers, in their Japanese Cinema Encyclopedia: The Sex Films call "one of the very best Nikkatsu pink films." Uncharacteristically for Kumashiro, The Woman with Red Hair has a straightforward narrative structure, but Jasper Sharp writes that it is still a "difficult" film for viewers who are not familiar with Kumashiro's work. The story, in which a woman running away from her husband and their two kids comes to live with a construction worker, can be viewed from many point of views: the one of a changing male friendship, the enormous difficulty of understanding that separates different sexes, or a woman's search for sexual satisfaction, as stated by Kumashiro himself. Sharp notes that "There is certainly more to the film than its superficial reading as a straightforward male fantasy [...] It is a love triangle character study built upon archetypes." Roughly one-third of the film takes place in the bedroom, with the claustrophobic atmosphere heightened by such exterior sounds as moaning from neighboring drug addicts, and non-stop rain.

Kumashiro also took breaks from the Roman Porno genre to direct mainstream films, beginning with Bitterness of Youth (1974), a story of student radicalism with similarities to Dreiser's An American Tragedy (1925). Other such films include Light of Africa (1975) for Toho and Jigoku (1979), a remake of Nobuo Nakagawa's 1960 film Jigoku, for Toei. For the German-Japanese co-production, Woman with the Red Hat (1982), Kumashiro worked with Pink Film producer-director Kōji Wakamatsu. The production was an unsuccessful attempt on Wakamatsu's part to emulate the success he had had in collaborating with the French in Nagisa Ōshima's In the Realm of the Senses (1976). The story, dealing with a Japanese man in Germany and his obsessive sexual relationship with a German woman during Hitler's rise to power, also seemed to echo Ōshima's film. Jasper Sharp notes with surprise that Kumashiro, who had long been an opponent of Japanese censorship, did not take advantage of the more liberal European laws. Instead he followed the Japanese practice of obscuring genital areas with props.

=== Death ===
Throughout his life Kumashiro was a frail and sickly man. In the 1980s, as the rising AV (Adult Video) industry took away most of the audience for the theatrical Roman pornos, Kumashiro's health began failing. He suffered from a collapsed lung in 1983, but, in spite of his poor health, he continued making films until his death. He directed his last two films, Like a Rolling Stone (Bo no Kanashimi) (1994) and Immoral: Indecent Relations (1995) while using an oxygen tank. He died of heart and lung failure on February 24, 1995.

Kumashiro is remembered with affection by those who worked with him, and is considered one of the best directors to have worked in the Roman Porno series. When interviewed for the British television program, Mondo Macabro, actress Kazuko Shirakawa observed that it may have been Kumashiro's poor physical condition which helped him to portray the fragility of human existence. The Japanese film critic and filmmaker Chiseko Tanaka summarized his career with, "Kumashiro was not a great poet like Mizoguchi, Imamura and Oshima. He was a little poet, but he was unique. He devoted himself to his works as a true artist."

== Filmography ==
- Front Row Life a.k.a. A Thirsty Life a.k.a. Fan Life (かぶりつき人生, Kaburitsuki Jinsei) (1968-04-13)
- Wet Lips a.k.a. Twisted Path of Love (濡れた唇, Nureta Kuchibiru) (1972-01-29)
- Ichijo's Wet Lust a.k.a. Ichijo Sayuri: Wet Desire (一条さゆり 濡れた欲情, Ichijo Sayuri: Nureta Yokujo) (1972-10-07)
- Lovers Are Wet (恋人たちは濡れた, Koibito-tachi wa Nureta) (1973-03-24)
- Female Hell: The Moist Forest a.k.a. Woods are Wet: Woman Hell (女地獄 森は濡れた, Onna Jigoku: Mori wa Nureta) (1973-05-23)
- Yakuza Justice: Erotic Code of Honor a.k.a. Yakuza Goddess: Lust and Honor (やくざ観音 情女仁義, Yakuza Kannon: Iro Jingi) (1973-07-14)
- The World of Geisha a.k.a. A Man & a Woman Behind the Fusuma Screen (四畳半襖の裏張り, Yojo-han Fusuma no Urabari) (1973-11-03)
- Moist Desires: 21 Strippers (濡れた欲情 特出し２１人, Nureta Yokujo: Tokudashi 21-nin) (1974-01-03)
- Behind the Sliding Door: Chaste Skin a.k.a. Man and Woman Behind the Fusuma Screen: Enduring Skin (四畳半襖の裏張り しのび肌, Yojo-han Fusuma no Urabari: Shinobi Hada) (1974-02-16)
- The Key (鍵, Kagi) (1974-05-04)
- Failed Youth a.k.a Bitterness of Youth (青春の蹉跌, Seishun no Satetsu) (1974-06-29)
- Street of Joy a.k.a. Red Light District: Gonna Get Out (赤線玉の井 ぬけられます, Akasen Tamanoi: Nukeraremasu) (1974-09-21)
- Evening Primrose (宵待草, Yoimachigusa) (1974-12-28)
- Invitation of Lust a.k.a. Love in a Small Room (櫛の火, Kushi no Hi) (1975-04-05)
- Light of Africa (アフリカの光, Africa no Hikari) (1975-06-21)
- Black Rose Ascension (黒薔薇昇天, Kurobara Shoten) (1975-08-09)
- Moist Desires: The Open Tulip a.k.a. Wet Lust: Opening the Tulip (濡れた欲情 ひらけ！チューリップ, Nureta Yokujo: Hirake! Churippu) (1975-12-24)
- Painful Bliss! Final Twist (悶絶！！どんでん返し, Monzetsu!! Dondengaeshi) (1977-02-01)
- Dannoura Pillow War (壇の浦夜枕合戦記, Dannoura Yomakura Kassenki) (1977-04-23)
- The Woman with Red Hair (赫い髪の女, Akai Kami no Onna) (1979-02-17)
- Hell a.k.a. The Inferno (地獄, Jigoku) (1979-06-03)
- Faraway Tomorrow (遠い明日, Tooi Ashita) (1979-11-03)
- Path of the Beast (少女娼婦 けものみち, Shoujo Shofu: Kemonomichi) (1980-03-29)
- Forbidden Games a.k.a. Pleasure Campus: Secret Games (快楽学園 禁じられた遊び, Kairaku Gakuen: Kinjirareta Asobi) (1980-11-21)
- Mister, Missus, Miss Lonely (ミスター・ミセス・ミス・ロンリー) (1980-12-20)
- Rolling on the Road a.k.a. Viva the Women! The Dirty Songs a.k.a. Oh! Women: A Dirty Song (嗚呼！おんなたち 猥歌, A! Onnatachi: Waika) (1981-10-23)
- Woman with the Red Hat a.k.a. Die Frau mit dem roten Hut (赤い帽子の女, Akai Boshi no Onna) (1982-10-16)
- River of No Return a.k.a. Modori River (もどり川, Modori-gawa) (1983-06-18)
- Okuhida Double Suicide (奥飛騨二重心中, Oku hida nijû shinjû) (1983-11-30)
- Mika Madoka: A Woman Who Moistens Her Finger a.k.a. Woman With Wet Fingers (美加マドカ 指を濡らす女, Mika Madoka: Yubi o Nurasu Onna) (1984-04-20)
- Love Letter (恋文, Koibumi) (1985-10-05)
- Women Who Do Not Divorce (離婚しない女, Rikon Shinai Onna) (1986-10-25)
- Bedtime Eyes (ベッドタイムアイズ) (1987-04-25)
- Love Bites Back a.k.a. A Woman Who Bites (噛む女, Kamu Onna) (1988-07-01)
- Like a Rolling Stone (棒の哀しみ, Bo no Kanashimi) (1994-10-01)
- Immoral: Indecent Relations (インモラル･淫らな関係, Immoral: Midarana Kankei) (1995-04-25)

== See also ==
- List of Nikkatsu Roman Porno films

== Sources ==
- Crow, Jonathan. "Tatsumi Kumashiro (Biography)". at Allmovie.
- "FILMOGRAPHY: Director Tatsumi Kumashiro (1927–1995)" in The Woman with Red Hair: A film by Tatsumi Kumashiro. (2003) Kimstim Collection DVD; Nikkatsu, Kino Video, Kimstim, Inc. KS2012.
- Hoberman, J. (2001-01-17). "Waking the Dread... A Tatsumi Kumashiro Retrospective". The Village Voice (in Japanese). Archived from the original on 2007-06-25.
- Johnson, William (2003). "A New View of Porn: The Films of Tatsumi Kumashiro" (PDF). Film Quarterly, vol. 57, no.1, Fall 2003. University of California Press. pp. 11–19. Archived from the original (PDF) on 2007-03-04.
- Kehr, Dave (January 12, 2001). "AT THE MOVIES; Profile in Acting: Playing J. F. K. ... On Kumashiro". The New York Times.
- "神代辰巳 (Kumashiro Tatsumi)". [Japanese Movie Database] (in Japanese).
- "TATSUMI KUMASHIRO". The Complete Index to World Film.
- Sharp, Jasper (2008). Behind the Pink Curtain: The Complete History of Japanese Sex Cinema. Guildford: FAB Press. ISBN 978-1-903254-54-7.
- Tatsumi Kumashiro at IMDb
- Weisser, Thomas; Yuko Mihara Weisser (1998). Japanese Cinema Encyclopedia: The Sex Films. Miami: Vital Books : Asian Cult Cinema Publications. ISBN 1-889288-52-7.
