= In the Realm of the Senses =

1976 Japanese film by Nagisa Ōshima

- Japanese theatrical poster
- Directed by: Nagisa Ōshima
- Screenplay by: Nagisa Ōshima
- Produced by: Anatole Dauman; Kōji Wakamatsu
- Starring: Eiko Matsuda; Tatsuya Fuji
- Cinematography: Hideo Ito
- Edited by: Keiichi Uraoka
- Music by: Minoru Miki
- Production companies: Oshima Productions; Argos Films; Oceanic
- Distributed by: Toho-Towa (Japan); Argos Films (France)
- Release dates: 15 September 1976 (France); 16 October 1976 (Japan)
- Running time: 102 minutes (Producer's Cut); 108 minutes (theatrical cut)
- Countries: Japan; France
- Language: Japanese
- Box office: $7.65 million (France/Germany); 1,424,906 kr (Sweden)

In the Realm of the Senses (Japanese: 愛のコリーダ, lit. 'Bullfight of Love', French: L'Empire des sens) is a 1976 erotic art film written and directed by Nagisa Ōshima. It is a fictionalised and sexually explicit treatment of a 1936 murder committed by Sada Abe. An international coproduction between Japanese and French companies, the film generated great controversy at the time of its release. The film had the involvement of pink film luminary Kōji Wakamatsu as co-screenwriter and assistant producer. While intended for mainstream wide release, the film contains scenes of unsimulated sexual activity between the actors (Eiko Matsuda and Tatsuya Fuji, among others). The film belongs to the romance/thriller genre.

== Plot ==
In 1936 Tokyo, Sada Abe is a former prostitute who now works as a maid in a hotel. The hotel's owner, Kichizo Ishida, initiates an intense affair that consists of sexual experiments and various self-indulgences. Ishida leaves his wife to pursue his affair with Sada. Sada becomes increasingly possessive and jealous of Ishida, and Ishida more eager to please her. Their mutual obsession escalates until Ishida finds that she is most excited by strangling him during lovemaking, and he is killed in this fashion. Sada then severs his penis. While she is shown next to him naked, it is mentioned that she will walk around with his organ for four days before being arrested while smiling radiantly. Words written with blood can be read on his chest: "Sada Kichi the two of us forever."

== Themes ==
The film explores themes of sexual obsession, power dynamics, and the blurred lines between violence and love, representing extreme consequences of resistance to social repression.

== Cast ==
- Eiko Matsuda as Sada Abe
- Tatsuya Fuji as Kichizō Ishida
- Aoi Nakajima as Toku
- Yasuko Matsui as Tagawa Inn manager
- Meika Seri as Matsuko
- Kanae Kobayashi as old geisha Kikuryū
- Taiji Tonoyama as old beggar
- Kyôji Kokonoe as teacher Ōmiya
- Naomi Shiraishi as geisha Yaeji
- Komikichi Hori as Mitsuwa Geisha

== Title ==
The film was released under the title of In the Realm of the Senses in the U.S. and the U.K., and under L'Empire des sens (Empire of the Senses) in France. The French title was taken from Roland Barthes's book about Japan, L'Empire des signes (Empire of Signs, 1970).

The original Japanese title Ai no Korīda was later reimagined as the title of the 1980 funk song "Ai No Corrida", originally recorded by Chaz Jankel and later brought to success by Quincy Jones in 1981.

== Censorship ==
Strict censorship laws in Japan would not have allowed the film to be made according to Ōshima's vision. This obstruction was bypassed by officially listing the production as a French enterprise, and the undeveloped footage was shipped to France for processing and editing. At its premiere in Japan, the film's sexual activity was optically censored using reframing and blurring. As of 2009, an uncensored version of the film had never been released in Japan. A book with stills and script notes from the film was published by San’ichishobo, and in 1976 the Japanese government brought obscenity charges against Ōshima and San’ichishobo. Ōshima testified in the trial and said. "Nothing that is expressed is obscene. What is obscene is what is hidden." Ōshima and the publisher were found not guilty in 1979; the government appealed and the Tokyo High Court upheld the verdict in 1982.

In the United States, the film was initially banned upon its premiere at the 1976 New York Film Festival but was later screened uncut, and a similar fate awaited the film when it was released in West Germany. It was also banned because of a scene in which Kichi pushes an egg into Sada's vagina, forcing her to push it out before Kichi eats the egg. The film was not available on home video until 1990, although it was sometimes seen uncut in film clubs.

At the time, the only European country in which the film was banned was Belgium. The ban was lifted in 1994, and Belgium has not censored a film of any kind since.

At the time of its initial screening at the 1976 London Film Festival, the British Board of Film Censors recommended that it be shown under private cinema club conditions to avoid the need for heavy cuts, but only after the Obscene Publications Act had been extended to films in 1977 to avoid potential legal problems. The film opened at the Gate Cinema Club in 1978. It was given an official countrywide cinema release in 1991, though the video release was delayed until 2000 when it was passed with an "18" certificate (suitable for adults only). All of the adult sexual activity was left intact, but a shot in which Sada yanks the penis of a prepubescent boy after he misbehaves was reframed, zooming in so that only the reaction of the boy was shown. In Australia, the film was originally banned, but a censored version was made available in 1977. In 2000, it finally became available in its complete version. The graphic sexual content of the production also caused it to be banned in Israel in 1987.

The film is available in uncut form in France, Germany, the United States (as part of The Criterion Collection), the Netherlands, Belgium and several other territories.

In Canada, when originally submitted to the provincial film boards in the 1970s, the film was rejected in all jurisdictions except Quebec, Manitoba and British Columbia. It was not until 1991 that individual provinces approved the film and gave it a certificate. However, in the Maritimes, the film was rejected again as the policies followed in the 1970s were still enforced.

In Brazil, the film was banned during the military dictatorship due to its explicit sex scenes. The ban was lifted in 1980.

Due to its sexual themes and explicit scenes, the film was the cause of great controversy in Portugal in 1991 after it aired on RTP. Some deemed it inappropriate even for the watershed slot, while others appreciated its airing. The film aired again on RTP2, almost unnoticed.

== Box office ==
In France, the film sold 1,730,874 tickets, grossing approximately €4,673,360 ($5,203,732). In Germany, where it was released in 1978, the film sold 693,628 tickets, grossing approximately €1,803,433 ($2,446,050). Combined, the film sold 2,424,502 tickets and grossed approximately $7,649,782 in France and Germany.

== Critical reception ==
On the film's release, Boxoffice wrote: "Oshima has handled some delicate themes in his past films and it is obvious here that he is attempting to make a bold statement, but what could have been a breakthrough in presenting explicit sex within a serious context quickly deteriorates into a very dull film."

In a 2009 retrospective review in The Guardian, Peter Bradshaw gave the film 5/5 stars, writing: "This uncompromising film has not dated one iota, perhaps because films that are really about sex are still such a rarity, despite the supposed sexiness of everything that surrounds us. ... Oshima's film widens and deepens the sensual realm."

In 2012, Sight and Sound wrote: "Thirty-six years on, In the Realm of the Senses is still startlingly confrontational, the unambiguously unsimulated sex scenes staged with an acute awareness of their participants' inner psychology in a way that conventional porn doesn't just omit but actively shuns. At a time (the mid-1930s) when Japanese foreign policy was becoming aggressively externalised, the lovers Sada and Kichi try to achieve both total privacy and perfect sexual fusion, constantly under the scrutiny of numerous onscreen voyeurs and, even when ostensibly closeted away from prying eyes, the film's own audience. In a way that Bishop Berkeley would undoubtedly recognise, the private is permanently public."

Empire wrote: "Argued by some to be a serious exploration of the connection between death and eroticism, and by others to be a particularly repellent piece of pornography, Ai No Corrida is an undeniably powerful, stylish and impressive piece of work."

On review aggregator website Rotten Tomatoes, the film holds a rating of 84% based on 38 critic reviews, with an average rating of 7.5 out of 10. The website's critical consensus reads, "Sexual taboos are broken and boundaries crossed In the Realm of the Senses, a fearlessly provocative psychosexual tale."

== See also ==
- Unsimulated sex
- Nudity in film (East Asian cinema since 1929)
- Erotic art
- List of cult films
