= Kokkuri-san (disambiguation) =

Kokkuri-san (こっくりさん) is a Japanese game popular during the Meiji era that is also a form of divination, partially based on Western table-turning.

Kokkuri-san may also refer to:

- Kokkuri-san (film), a 1997 Japanese horror film
- Kokkuri-san: Gekijoban, a 2011 Japanese horror film
- Kokkuri-san: Shin Toshi Densetsu, a 2014 Japanese horror

== See also ==
- Gugure! Kokkuri-san, a Japanese manga series
