= List of Japanese films of 1995 =

== Highest-grossing films ==
Rank	Title	Gross
1	Whisper of the Heart	¥1.85 billion
2	Godzilla vs. SpaceGodzilla	¥1.65 billion
3	Tora-san's Easy Advice	¥1.55 billion

== List of films ==
A list of films released in Japan in 1995 (see 1995 in film).

Japanese films released in 1995
Title	Director	Cast	Genre	Notes
Blissful Genuine Sex: Penetration!	Toshiki Satō	Hotaru Hazuki	Pink	Pink Grand Prix for Best Film
Crayon Shin-chan: Unkokusai's Ambition	Mitsuru Hongo		—N/a	
Deep River	Kei Kumai	Kumiko Akiyoshi, Eiji Okuda, Hisashi Igawa	Drama	
Dragon Ball Z: Fusion Reborn	Shigeyasu Yamauchi		Anime	
Dragon Ball Z: Wrath of the Dragon	Mitsuo Hashimoto		Anime	The final Dragon Ball Z animated film to be released in theaters until Dragon Ball Z: Battle of Gods in 2013.
East Meets West	Kihachi Okamoto	Hiroyuki Sanada	—N/a	
Eko Eko Azarak: Wizard of Darkness	Shimako Sato	Kimika Yoshino, Miho Kanno, Miho Tamura	Horror	
Emergency Call	Kazuki Ōmori	Hiroyuki Sanada, Lorna Tolentino, Sharmaine Arnaiz, Daniel Fernando	Drama	Japanese-Filipino co-production
Eternal Moment	Seijiro Koyama	Yasuko Sawaguchi, Kumiko Goto, Masahiro Takashima	—N/a	
Farewell to Nostradamus	Takeshi Shirato		—N/a	
Flirt	Hal Hartley	Martin Donovan, Parker Posey	Comedy-drama, romance	American-German-Japanese co-production
Gamera: Guardian of the Universe	Shusuke Kaneko	Shinobu Nakayama, Ayako Fujitani, Yukijiro Hotaru	Science fiction	
Getting Any?	Takeshi Kitano	Dannkann	Comedy	
Ghost in the Shell	Mamoru Oshii		Science fiction	
Godzilla vs. Destoroyah	Takao Okawara	Takurō Tatsumi, Yōko Ishino, Yasufumi Hayashi	Science fiction	
Gonin	Takashi Ishii	Takeshi Kitano, Kōichi Satō, Masahiro Motoki	Crime, thriller	
Good Men, Good Women	Hou Hsiao-hsien	Lim Giong, Annie Shizuka Inoh, Jack Kao	Drama	Taiwanese-Japanese co-production
Hana Yori Dango	Yasuyuki Kusuda	Yuki Uchida	Romance	
Hiroshima	Koreyoshi Kurahara, Roger Spottiswoode	Kenneth Welsh, Hisashi Igawa	Drama	
Kamikaze Taxi	Masato Harada			
Kura	Yasuo Furuhata	Yūko Asano		
A Last Note	Kaneto Shindō	Haruko Sugimura; Nobuko Otowa		Japan Academy Prize for Best Film, entered into Moscow
Like Grains of Sand	Ryosuke Hashiguchi	Yoshinori Okada, Ayumi Hamasaki	Drama	
Listen to the Voices of the Sea	Hideo Sekigawa	Akitake Konō, Hajime Izu, Yasumi Hara	War	
Love Letter	Shunji Iwai	Miho Nakayama, Etsushi Toyokawa, Bunjaku Han	Drama, romance	
Maborosi	Hirokazu Koreeda	Makiko Esumi, Tadanobu Asano, Akira Emoto	Drama, mystery	
Mechanical Violator Hakaider				
Memories	Katsuhiro Otomo, Koji Morimoto, Tensai Okamura		Fantasy, science fiction	
Mr. Children in Film	Takeshi Kobayashi	Kazutoshi Sakurai, Kenichi Tahara, Keisuke Nakagawa	Documentary	
Ohranger Movie				
Ring: Kanzenban	Chisui Takigawa	Katsunori Takahashi, Yoshio Harada, Mai Tachihara		Television film
Sailor Moon SuperS: The Movie	Hiroki Shibata		Anime	The final Sailor Moon film released in theaters.
School Ghost Stories	Hideyuki Hirayama	Hironobu Nomura, Ayako Sugiyama, Masahiro Sato	—N/a	
Sexual Desires in the Ladies' Restroom: Dripping!	Yutaka Ikejima	Kimitake Hiraoka; Kaoru Yuzu	Pink	Silver Prize at the Pink Grand Prix
Sharaku	Masahiro Shinoda			Entered into the 1995 Cannes Film Festival
Slam Dunk: Howling Basketman Spirit!!			Anime	
Slam Dunk: Shohoku's Greatest Challenge!			Anime	
Sleeping Beauty	Toshi Hiruma	Garry Chalk, Ian James Corlett, Terry Klassen, Andrea Libman	Animation	Japanese American co-production
Tokyo Fist	Shinya Tsukamoto	Shinya Tsukamoto, Kahori Fujii, Kōji Tsukamoto	Avant-garde, horror	
Tora-san to the Rescue	Yoji Yamada	Kiyoshi Atsumi	Comedy	48th and last in the Otoko wa Tsurai yo series
Whisper of the Heart	Yoshifumi Kondō		Drama	

== See also ==
- 1995 in Japan
- 1995 in Japanese television
