= Tōru Nakane =

Japanese actor

- Born: November 6, 1957 (age 68); Tokyo, Japan
- Occupation: Actor
- Years active: 1982-

Tōru Nakane (中根徹, Nakane Tōru) is a Japanese actor who was born in Tokyo, Japan on November 6, 1957. He has appeared extensively in pink films and on television. The pink film critics Thomas and Yuko Mihara Weisser commented in 1998 that "he is generally considered one of the best actors in the pink business."

== Life and career ==
=== Pink film ===
Nakane's earliest film credit in the Japanese Movie Database is the April 1982 Roman Porno film Female Teacher: In Front of the Students (女教師 生徒の眼の前で, Onna kyōshi: seito no me no maede), which was part of the Female Teacher series from Nikkatsu. In the next two years, Nakane starred in three gay-themed films for ENK, a studio which almost exclusively produced homosexual oriented works. The trilogy, consisting of Male Season a.k.a. Our Season (ぼくらの季節, Bokura No Kisetsu), Male Generation a.k.a. Our Generation (Bokura No Jidai) and Male Moment a.k.a. Our Moment (Bokura No Shunkan), all directed by Ryūichi Hiroki, were frank and sympathetic to their gay protagonists.

In July 1984, Nakane also appeared in the pink film High Noon Ripper (真昼の切り裂き魔, Mahiru No Kirisaki-ma) for the Shintōhō Eiga studio, where he was cast as a tabloid editor who plays amateur detective to catch a serial killer slasher. Later that same year, in November 1984, he played a college tutor who was "very popular with the college girls" in the Nikkatsu production Teacher, Don't Turn Me On! (先生、私の体に火をつけないで, Sensei, Watashi No Karada Ni Hi O Tsukenaide).

In 1985 and again in 1986, Nakane was honored by the Zoom-Up Film Festival (ズームアップ映画祭) as Best Actor in their Zoom-Up Awards for his work in pink film during the previous year. Nakane appeared with actor-director Kazuhiro Sano in the Hisayasu Satō-directed feature for Shintōhō Eiga in March 1988, called Hard Focus: Eavesdrop (ハードフォーカス 盗聴＜ぬすみぎき＞, Hādo Fōkasu tōchō - Nusumi-giki) - also known under the director's title of Survey Map of a Paradise Lost. The film took the 9th Place Best Film award from the 1988 Pink Grand Prix ceremony.

In October 1989, Nakane played opposite Nao Saejima in the supernatural pink thriller Abnormal Excitement: Nao Saejima, where the Weissers noted his fine performance. The film was chosen as Best Film of the year at the 1989 Pink Grand Prix festival. That same year also saw Nakane in Molester's Train: Get On From The Back!, which took the award for Seventh Best Film from the Pink Grand Prix. For his work in such films, Nakane himself won the Pink Grand Prix Best Actor award for the year 1989.

For Toshiki Satō's 1990 film, Soaking Wet: Touching All Over the Body (ぐしょ濡れ全身愛撫 ＢＯＤＹ ＴＯＵＣＨ, Gushonure: Zenshin Aibu), the Weissers remarked that Nakane was lauded by the mainstream critics for his performance in the film. In April 1993, Nakane performed with AV Idol Yumika Hayashi in the pink film Molester's Commuter Train: Office Lady's Sexuality (痴漢通勤電車 ＯＬたちの性, Chikan Tsūkin Densha: OL-tachi no Sei), which was distributed by Shintōhō Eiga.

=== Later career ===
Nakane started his television acting career as early as 1997 with a small role in the Tokyo Broadcasting System romantic series A Forever Love (最後の恋, Saigo no koi). He subsequently appeared in The Conductor Murder episode in season 3 (aired in 1999) of the Fuji TV mystery series Furuhata Ninzaburō. In 2008, he performed in Episode 11 of the NTV series Gokusen, which was based on the manga of the same name. Nakane also appeared in several episodes of the 2009 Fuji TV miniseries The Waste Land (不毛地帯, Fumō Chitai), which was based on the book by Toyoko Yamasaki.

Additionally, Nakane played a part in the 2010 action drama movie The Negotiator - The Movie - also known as Kōshōnin: The movie - Taimu rimitto kōdo 10,000 m no zunōsen (交渉人 THE MOVIE タイムリミット 高度10,000mの頭脳戦), which was based on the TV show Kōshōnin.

== Roles ==
- Naruto - Fuki's Father
- Naruto Shippuden - Ishikawa
- Hunter x Hunter - Basho
- One Piece - Daifugo, Vice-Admiral Pomsky
