= Lolita: Vibrator Torture =

- Theatrical poster for Lolita: Vibrator Torture (1987)
- Directed by: Hisayasu Satō
- Written by: Shirō Yumeno
- Starring: Sayaka Kimura; Kiyomi Itō
- Cinematography: Toshihiko Ryū
- Edited by: Shōji Sakai
- Music by: Sō Hayakawa
- Distributed by: Shishi Productions; Nikkatsu
- Release date: September 19, 1987
- Running time: 63 minutes
- Country: Japan
- Language: Japanese

Lolita: Vibrator Torture (ロリータ・バイブ責め, Roriita: Baibu Zeme) is a 1987 Japanese pink film directed by Hisayasu Satō. It was produced by producer-director Kan Mukai's Shishi Productions. It was released by Nikkatsu and shown as the third feature of a triple-bill with two films in their Roman Porno series. The film includes the first screen role for Takeshi Itō, who would go on to be one of the most popular pink film actors of his era. Takeshi Itō won the first Best Actor award at the Pink Grand Prix for his performance in Toshiya Ueno's Keep on Masturbating: Non-Stop Pleasure, and lead actress of Lolita: Vibrator Torture, Kiyomi Itō was awarded Best Actress at the same ceremony for Hisayasu Satō's Dirty Wife Getting Wet.

== Synopsis ==
A man captures schoolgirls and takes them to an abandoned freight container in Shinjuku which he has decorated with enlarged black & white images of the faces of his previous victims. He smears the captive girls with paint and shaving cream, rapes, tortures and brutally murders them.

== Cast ==
- Sayaka Kimura
- Kiyomi Itō
- Rio Yanagawa
- Yūko Suwano
- Ayako Toyama
- Yutaka Ikejima

== Critical reception ==
Allmovie, noting the film's "strong graphic visuals" judges Lolita: Vibrator Torture to be "[o]ne of Sato's most repellent and excessive pinku-eiga films." In reference to genre, the review concludes that "[t]he focus here is on sadism and gore rather than erotica." In their Japanese Cinema Encyclopedia: The Sex Films the Weissers confirm that this "is usually cited as Sato's most grotesque film."

Jasper Sharp writes that Lolita: Vibrator Torture "does for the marital aid what Tobe Hooper did for the chainsaw." He uses the film as an example of Satō's use of the distorting ability of the camera, pointing out the "stroboscopic intensity" that the flashing stills camera adds to the disturbing imagery of the film.

Award-winning director Yūji Tajiri, one of the "Seven Lucky Gods of Pink" (ピンク七福神, Shichi Fukujin), cites Lolita: Vibrator Torture as one of the inspirations for his own career. He remembers, "One day I saw Lolita Vibrator Torture by Hisayasu Satō, and was fascinated by this film, which was completely different from anything I had ever seen before." Satō's presence at Shishi Productions, where he directed Lolita: Vibrator Torture was influential in Tajiri's decision to join the studio in 1990.

== Availability ==
Lolita: Vibrator Torture was released theatrically on September 19, 1987. On March 22, 2002, Uplink released the film on DVD in Japan as The Secret Garden (秘蜜の花園, Himitsu no Hanazono). This was Satō's original title for the film.

== Bibliography ==
=== English ===
- Lolita vib-zeme (1987) at IMDb
- Sharp, Jasper. "Lolita Vibrator Torture (review)". www.midnighteye.com. Archived from the original on 2009-09-13.
- Sharp, Jasper (2008). Behind the Pink Curtain: The Complete History of Japanese Sex Cinema. Guildford: FAB Press. pp. 5, 18, 263, 268, 269, 315, 357. ISBN 978-1-903254-54-7.
- Weisser, Thomas; Yuko Mihara Weisser (1998). Japanese Cinema Encyclopedia: The Sex Films. Miami: Vital Books : Asian Cult Cinema Publications. ISBN 1-889288-52-7.

=== French ===
- Vieillot, Martin. "Lolita Vibrator Torture" (in French). eigagogo.free.fr.

=== Japanese ===
- ロリータ・バイブ責め(1987) (in Japanese). allcinema.net.
- ロリータ・バイブ責め (in Japanese). Japanese Movie Database.
- "ロリータ・バイブ責め". Japanese Cinema Database (Agency for Cultural Affairs).
- ロリータ・バイブ責め(邦画 ) (in Japanese). Kinema Junpo.
