= 1995 in Japanese television =

Events in 1995 in Japanese television.

== Events ==
- November 1 – Tokyo MX (Tokyo Metropolitan Television) was first official broadcasting start.

== Debuts ==
Show	Station	Premiere Date	Genre	Original Run
Azuki-chan	NHK	March 17	anime	April 4, 1995 - March 17, 1998
Bonobono	TV Tokyo	April 20	anime	April 20, 1995 – March 28, 1996
Bit the Cupid	TV Tokyo	April 20	anime	April 20, 1995 – March 28, 1996
The Brave of Gold Goldran	TV Asahi	February 4	anime	February 4, 1995 – January 27, 1996
Chibi Maruko-chan	Fuji TV	January 8	anime	January 8, 1995 – present
Choriki Sentai Ohranger	TV Asahi	March 3	tokusatsu	March 3, 1995 – February 23, 1996
Fushigi Yûgi	TV Tokyo	April 6	anime	April 6, 1995 – March 28, 1996
Juukou B-Fighter	TV Asahi	February 5	tokusatsu	February 5, 1995 – February 25, 1996
Mobile Suit Gundam Wing	TV Asahi	April 7	anime	April 7, 1995 – March 29, 1996
Neon Genesis Evangelion	TV Tokyo	October 4	anime	October 4, 1995 – March 27, 1996
Nurse Angel Ririka SOS	TV Tokyo	July 7	anime	July 7, 1995 - March 29, 1996
Sailor Moon SuperS	TV Asahi	March 4	anime	March 4, 1995 - March 2, 1996
Slayers	TV Tokyo	April 7	anime	April 7, 1995 – September 29, 1995

== Ongoing shows ==
- Music Fair, music (1964–present)
- Mito Kōmon, jidaigeki (1969–2011)
- Sazae-san, anime (1969–present)
- Ōoka Echizen, jidaigeki (1970–1999)
- FNS Music Festival, music (1974–present)
- Panel Quiz Attack 25, game show (1975–present)
- Doraemon, anime (1979–2005)
- Kiteretsu Daihyakka, anime (1988–1996)
- Soreike! Anpanman, anime (1988–present)
- Dragon Ball Z, anime (1989–1996)
- Downtown no Gaki no Tsukai ya Arahende!!, game show (1989–present)
- Soreike! Anpanman, anime (1988–present)
- Crayon Shin-chan, anime (1992–present)
- Iron Chef, cooking show (1993–1999)
- Shima Shima Tora no Shimajirō, anime (1993–2008)
- Nintama Rantarō, anime (1993–present)
- Sailor Moon, anime (1992–1997)

== Endings ==
Show	Station	End Date	Genre	Original Run
Blue Seed	TV Tokyo	March 29	anime	October 5, 1994 - March 29, 1995
Blue SWAT	TV Asahi	January 27	tokusatsu	January 30, 1994 – January 27, 1995
Brave Police J-Decker	Nagoya TV	January 28	anime	February 5, 1994 – January 28, 1995
Captain Tsubasa J	TV Tokyo	December 22	anime	October 21, 1994 - December 22, 1995
Chō Kuse ni Narisō	NHK	March 28	anime	April 5, 1994 - March 28, 1995
Cooking Papa	TV Asahi	May 25	anime	April 9, 1992 – May 25, 1995
Ginga Sengoku Gun'yūden Rai	TV Tokyo	March 31	anime	April 8, 1994 – March 31, 1995
Haō Taikei Ryū Knight	TV Tokyo	March 28	anime	April 5, 1994 – March 28, 1995
Macross 7	MBS	September 24	anime	October 16, 1994 – September 24, 1995
Montana Jones	NHK	April 8	anime	April 2, 1994 – April 8, 1995
Ninja Sentai Kakuranger	TV Asahi	February 24	tokusatsu	February 18, 1994 – February 24, 1995
Pig Girl of Love and Courage: Tonde Burin	MBS	August 26	anime	September 3, 1994 - August 26, 1995
Sailor Moon S	TV Asahi	February 25	anime	March 19, 1994 - February 25, 1995
Slayers	TV Tokyo	April 7	anime	April 7, 1995 – September 29, 1995
Shirayuki Hime no Densetsu	NHK	March 29	anime	April 6, 1994 - March 29, 1995
Tottemo! Luckyman	TV Tokyo	April 6	anime	April 6, 1994 - March 23, 1995
YuYu Hakusho	Fuji TV	January 7	anime	October 10, 1992 - January 7, 1995

== See also ==
- 1995 in anime
- List of Japanese television dramas
- 1995 in Japan
- List of Japanese films of 1995
