= Office Lady Love Juice =

- DVD cover art
- Directed by: Yūji Tajiri
- Distributed by: Shintōhō Eiga
- Release date: February 26, 1999
- Running time: 58 min.
- Country: Japan
- Language: Japanese

Office Lady Love Juice (ＯＬの愛汁 ラブジュース, OL no aijiru: rabu jūsu) is a 1999 Japanese Pink film directed by Yūji Tajiri. It was chosen as Best Film of the year at the Pink Grand Prix ceremony.

After her boyfriend leaves her, a 28-year-old woman has a romance with a 20-year-old man. Jasper Sharp writes that Office Lady Love Juice is a good entry film for newcomers to the pink film genre. It is, he judges, a "subtly-realised and well-drawn character study" which marked a change in style for Kokuei.

Longtime fans of the genre also showed their approval by awarding it Best Film at the 1999 Pink Grand Prix. The film also won awards for Best Director (Yūji Tajiri), Best Screenplay (Kōsuke Takeda) and Best Actor (Mikio Satō). The film became something of a symbol of the rift between the older pinku shitenno ("Four Heavenly Kings" or "Four Devils") and the shichifukujin ("Seven Lucky Gods") groups of directors when it beat Takahisa Zeze's Anarchy in Japansuke: The Woman Who Comes When Watched for the top spot. The older Zeze had been a vocal critic of the younger directors' films which avoided the experimentation and politically charged messages which characterize the work of the shitenno. Calling the shichifukujin's films "weak" and "light", Zeze engaged in a heated spat with Tajiri on the stage of the awards ceremony. Jasper Sharp writes that the scuffle was mainly a staged controversy for the benefit of the audience, as no real personal animosity exists between the two groups of directors. The younger group all gained their first filmmaking experiences by working on films of the older directors.

The mainstream film community also awarded the film at the 9th "Japanese Film Professional's Award" ceremony, where Love Juice was named the 7th best release of the year. In 2002, three years after its initial release, the film had the distinction of winning the last P-1 Grand-Prix. This festival was designed to highlight the current crop of pink films by showing 16 of the best releases on double-bills over a one-week period. At the end of the showings, the audience voted for the best film. Because of the expense involved in mounting the festival, it was only held three times. The 2002 ceremony was included as part of the Udine Far East Film Festival.

Preceded by Moon Light Dinner	Pink Grand Prix for Best Film; 1999	Succeeded by Sad and Painful Search: Office Lady Essay
