= The Dream of Garuda =

- DVD cover
- Directed by: Takahisa Zeze
- Starring: Takeshi Itō; Saki Kurihara; Shirō Shimomoto; Hotaru Hazuki
- Production company: Kokuei
- Distributed by: Shintōhō Eiga
- Release date: 22 April 1994 (Japan)
- Running time: 62 minutes
- Country: Japan
- Language: Japanese

The Dream of Garuda (Japanese: 高級ソープテクニック４ 悶絶秘戯) is a 1994 Japanese erotic film directed by Takahisa Zeze and starring Takeshi Itō, Saki Kurihara and Shirō Shimomoto.

== Cast ==
- Takeshi Itō
- Saki Kurihara
- Shirō Shimomoto
- Hotaru Hazuki

== Reception ==
It was selected for the main programme of the 1996 International Film Festival Rotterdam, where it had its international premiere. It was chosen as the 9th best film at 7th Pink Grand Prix and as the 10th best film at the 4th Japanese Professional Movie Awards.
