= I Thought About You (disambiguation) =

"I Thought About You" is a 1939 popular song composed by Jimmy Van Heusen with lyrics by Johnny Mercer.

I Thought About You may also refer to:

- I Thought About You (Shirley Horn album), 1987
- I Thought About You (Eliane Elias album)
- I Thought About You (film), a 1997 Japanese film
