= Adultery Diary: One More Time While I'm Still Wet =

- DVD cover
- Directed by: Toshiki Satō
- Written by: Masahiro Kobayashi
- Produced by: Daisuke Asakura
- Starring: Hotaru Hazuki
- Edited by: Naoki Kaneko
- Production company: Kokuei
- Distributed by: Shintōhō Eiga
- Release date: July 5, 1996
- Running time: 59 minutes
- Country: Japan
- Language: Japanese

Adultery Diary: One More Time While I'm Still Wet (不倫日記 濡れたままもう一度, Furin nikki: nureta mama mō ichidō) is a 1996 Japanese pink film directed by Toshiki Satō. It was chosen as Best Film of the year at the Pink Grand Prix ceremony. The film was released on video as My Wife is a Ghost: One More Time While I'm Still Wet (奥様はゆうれい 濡れたままもう一度, Okusama wa yūrei: nureta mama mō ichidō).

== Synopsis ==
A bored housewife dreams of becoming a novelist. She enrolls in a writing class and commences an affair with her tutor.

== Cast ==
- Hotaru Hazuki
- Yukiko Izumi
- Takeshi Itō
- Kazuhiro Sano

== Reception ==
Besides winning Best Film spot at the Pink Grand Prix, lead actress Hotaru Hazuki was awarded Best Actress and Masahiro Kobayashi won Best Screenplay at the awards ceremony. As an indication of the growing female audience for the pink film genre in recent years, the film was featured as a "Ladies Theatre" selection on the AII broadband service. The site described Adultery Diary as a pink Ghost.

== Bibliography ==
=== English ===
- Sharp, Jasper (2008). Behind the Pink Curtain: The Complete History of Japanese Sex Cinema. Guildford: FAB Press. pp. 273, 293, 358. ISBN 978-1-903254-54-7.

=== Japanese ===
- 不倫日記 濡れたままもう一度(1996) (in Japanese). allcinema.net.
- 不倫日記 濡れたままもう一度 (in Japanese). Japanese Movie Database.
- 禁断の"Ｒ"シリーズ (in Japanese). P.G. Web Site.

| Preceded by Blissful Genuine Sex: Penetration! | Pink Grand Prix for Best Film; 1996 | Succeeded by I Thought About You |
