= Serial Rape: Perverted Experiment =

- Theatrical poster for Serial Rape: Perverted Experiment (1990)
- Directed by: Hisayasu Satō
- Written by: Shirō Yumeno
- Starring: Rokuzō; Asuka Morimura
- Cinematography: Kōichi Saitō
- Edited by: Shōji Sakai
- Music by: Kirara
- Distributed by: Shishi Productions; Xces Films
- Release date: February 1990
- Running time: 60 minutes
- Country: Japan
- Language: Japanese

Serial Rape: Perverted Experiment (連続レイプ 変態実験, Renzoku Rape: Hentai Jikken) is a 1990 Japanese pink film directed by Hisayasu Satō.

== Synopsis ==
Tired of the belligerence and bad manners of a female customer, two shop owners kidnap her and subject her to a series of sexual assaults and tortures with utensils from the shop.

== Cast ==
- Rokuzō
- Asuka Morimura
- Kazuhiro Sano
- Kiyomi Itō
- Sayoko Nakajima

== Critical appraisal ==
Allmovie dismisses Serial Rape: Perverted Experiment as, "another barbaric pinku-eiga from cult filmmaker Hisayasu Sato". The review judges the plot to be "paper-thin" and "just an excuse to portray the woman being tied up, beaten, and raped with various home appliances". Noting that the sexual content is less pronounced than in most of Satō's pink films, Allmovie concludes that the film is, "likely to repel the average softcore viewer while disappointing fans of harder-edged entertainment".

In their Japanese Cinema Encyclopedia: The Sex Films, the Weissers give Serial Rape: Perverted Experiment two and a half stars out of four noting of the vicious violence towards women displayed in the film, that at least Satō gives the attacks some motivation this time.

== Bibliography ==
=== English ===
- Renzoku rape: hentai jikken (1990) at IMDb

=== Japanese ===
- 連続レイプ 変態実験 (in Japanese). Japanese Movie Database.
- "連続レイプ 変態実験". Japanese Cinema Database (Agency for Cultural Affairs).
