= Anarchy in Japansuke =

- DVD cover
- Directed by: Takahisa Zeze
- Written by: Takahisa Zeze
- Produced by: Nakato Kinukawa; Akira Fukuhara
- Starring: Kazuhiro Sano; Yumeka Sasaki
- Cinematography: Kōichi Saitō
- Edited by: Shōji Sakai
- Music by: Gorō Yasukawa
- Production company: Kokuei
- Distributed by: Shintōhō Eiga
- Release date: April 23, 1999
- Running time: 68 min.
- Country: Japan
- Language: Japanese

Anarchy in Japansuke (アナーキー・イン・じゃぱんすけ, Anaakii in jyapansuke) original title Anarchy in Japansuke: The Woman Who Comes When Watched (アナーキー・イン・じゃぱんすけ 見られてイク女, Anaakii in jyapansuke: mirarete iku onna) is a 1999 Japanese pink film directed by Takahisa Zeze. It won the Silver Prize at the Pink Grand Prix ceremony.

Along with Office Lady Love Juice, the film became something of a symbol of the rift between the older pinku shitenno ("Four Heavenly Kings" or "Four Devils") group of pink film directors and the younger shichifukujin ("Seven Lucky Gods"). Yūji Tajiri's Office Lady Love Juice beat Anarchy in Japansuke for the top spot at the Pink Grand Prix. The older Zeze had been a vocal critic of the younger directors' films, which avoided the experimentation and politically charged messages which characterize the work of the shitenno. Calling the shichifukujin's films "weak" and "light", Zeze engaged in a spat with Tajiri on the stage of the awards ceremony. Jasper Sharp writes that the scuffle was mainly a staged controversy for the benefit of the audience, as no real personal animosity exists between the two groups of directors. The younger group all gained their first film-making experiences by working on films of the older directors.

== Synopsis ==
The lives of a group of punk-like characters, and their growing maturity, or lack thereof, is explored in a storyline shifting between 1981 and 1989. In contrast to Zeze's usual somber style, and like the later Tokyo X Erotica, Anarchy in Japansuke is one of the director's lighter films.

== Cast ==
- Kazuhiro Sano as Tatsutoshi
- Yumeka Sasaki as Mizuki
- Yukiko Izumi
- Natsuko Sawada
- Mariko Naka
- Mikio Satō
- Yūichi Minato
- Tarō Suwa as Tatsutoshi's friend (with sunglasses)
- Shirō Shimomoto as Gumyoji

== Availability ==
The film was released theatrically under its full title, Anarchy in Japansuke: The Woman Who Comes When Watched, on April 23, 1999. On October 30, 1999, it was released on DVD in Japan under the shorter title, Anarchy in Japansuke.

== Bibliography ==
=== English ===
- Anâkî in Japansuke: Mirarete iku onna (1999) at IMDb
- Sharp, Jasper (2008). Behind the Pink Curtain: The Complete History of Japanese Sex Cinema. Guildford: FAB Press. pp. 273, 288, 314, 368. ISBN 978-1-903254-54-7.

=== Japanese ===
- アナーキー・イン・じゃぱんすけ 見られてイク女(1999) (in Japanese). allcinema.net.
- アナーキー・イン・じゃぱんすけ (in Japanese). www.dmm.co.jp.
- アナーキー・インじゃぱんすけ 見られてイク女 (in Japanese). Japanese Movie Database.
- "Variety Japan" アナーキー・インじゃぱんすけ 見られてイク女 (in Japanese). Variety Japan.
- アナーキー・インじゃぱんすけ 見られてイク女 (in Japanese). www.walkerplus.com. Archived from the original on 2005-03-19.
