= Kokkuri =

Japanese game

Kokkuri (こっくり, 狐狗狸) or Kokkuri-san (こっくりさん) is a Japanese game popular during the Meiji era that is also a form of divination, partially based on Western table-turning. The name kokkuri is an onomatopoeia meaning "to nod up and down", and refers to the movement of the actual kokkuri mechanism. The kanji used to write the word is an ateji, although its characters reflect the popular belief that the movement of the mechanism is caused by supernatural agents (ko 狐, kitsune; ku 狗, dog/tengu; ri 狸, tanuki). The modern version is similar to a Ouija board.

== Ancient kokkuri ==
The word kokkuri refers to the game and physical apparatus, while kokkuri-san refers to the being that is summoned: it is considered by the Japanese to be some sort of animal spirit that is a mix between a fox, dog, and raccoon. These three animals are meant to reflect the dual nature of the being, justifying its different personality traits: the fox being a trickster or teacher, and the raccoon being both a bearer of mischief and good fortune. Kokkuri-san is believed to possess the apparatus in order to communicate with humans. The physical mechanism is composed of three bamboo rods arranged to make a tripod, upon which is placed a small pot lid or platter, which is covered by a cloth. In some versions, tags are inserted into each of the three rods, with the words kitsune, tengu, and tanuki, respectively; in others, the words are merely traced with a finger on the bottom of the plate. Three or more people will place both their hands upon the kokkuri (lined-up, as in table-turning) and ask the spirit a question, which that spirit will in theory answer by moving (or not moving) the legs underneath the plate.

Japanese folklorist Inoue Enryō wrote about the kokkuri phenomenon, denouncing it as mere superstition, yet his efforts did not succeed in de-popularizing the game. Some scientific figures of the age attempted to explain the phenomena with the more scientific sounding yet ultimately equally mysterious term "human-electricity;" these same figures claimed the cloth used should always be of a white or gold color. Blue cloth was (incorrectly) said to hamper the human-electricity's passage. The human-electricity needing a passage, it was stated the game required participants to place both hands on the apparatus, with finger tips touching - as in Western table-turning.

The game is sometimes referred to as Okatabuki, Angel-san or Cupid-san.

== Modern kokkuri ==
Modern kokkuri has changed heavily from its original form, now resembling the much more common Ouija board, but played with a sheet of paper. A torii is drawn in the top-center of the paper, with the words 'Yes' and 'No' written on either side; a letter grid (most often hiragana) is placed underneath the torii, along with the numbers 0-9. A small coin (most recommended being the ten yen) is used as a planchette.

A session of kokkuri involves more rituals than a session with an Ouija board. Before playing, a door or window must be propped open to allow the spirit to enter the room, and it must be closed again when the spirit leaves at the end of the session. In addition, the implements must be expended during the first 24 hours after the game is played; the paper must be burned, the ink in the pen used to draw on the paper must be used up, and the coin should be spent in a financial transaction. This modern version is sometimes referred to as Spirit of the Coin.

== In popular culture ==
- In Gugure! Kokkuri-san, the three main yōkai characters are a fox spirit (kitsune), dog spirit (inugami), and tanuki spirit (bake-danuki).
- In episode 2 of Haven't You Heard? I'm Sakamoto, the eponymous character ends a dispute between 3 students playing the game by pretending to be possessed.
- In episode 5 of Nichijou, the character Yuuko Aioi goes to great lengths to explain the game to her classmate, Mio Naganohara, who then declines to play the game.
- In Junji Ito’s short story Souichi's Home Tutor, Souchi lists kokkuri as one of his personal hobbies, but explains he doesn't need paper and simply asks a geisha doll questions instead.
- The 1997 Japanese horror film Kokkuri-san revolves around the playing of the game. The game is also a central element of the films Kokkuri-san: Gekijoban (2011) and Kokkuri-san: Shin Toshi Densetsu (2014). Despite the similar titles, the films are unrelated.
- In both the manga and the live action version of Tomodachi Game, the main characters have to play Kokkuri to try and reduce their debt.
- In the first chapter of Jujutsu Kaisen, Yuji Itadori is seen using a kokkuri. This scene also appears in the first episode of the anime adaptation.
- In the manga and anime Shaman King, the character Tamao Tamamura frequently uses a kokkuri.
- A kokkuri appears in episode 8 of Great Teacher Onizuka.
- In episode 3 of the popular CLAMP anime xxxHOLiC (vol. 3 chap. 17 of the manga), the main conflict revolves around students playing Kokkuri too much. The episode itself is titled "Angel" (エンゼル, "Enzeru")

== See also ==
- Bunshinsaba
- Charlie Charlie challenge
- Fuji
- Futomani
- Jailangkung
- O-mikuji
- Ouija
- Tengenjutsu
