= Hotaru Hazuki =

Japanese actress and gravure model

- Born: Sayoko Ishii; February 21, 1970 (age 56); Fukushima Prefecture, Japan

Hotaru Hazuki (葉月螢 or 葉月蛍, Hazuki Hotaru) is a Japanese actress and gravure model known for her work on the stage and in more pink films. She has appeared in award-winning pink films and was given "Best Actress" awards at the Pink Grand Prix for her work in this genre in 1995 and 1996. Including second-place awards, Hazuki has won five awards in the Best Actress category and one Best New Actress award, a record at the Pink Grand Prix. She has been called the "Queen of Pink Eiga" and the "Last Pink Actress."

== Life and career ==
Hotaru Hazuki was born in Fukushima Prefecture in 1970 as Sayoko Ishii (石井佐代子, Ishii Sayoko). She joined the Suizokukan Gekijō (Aquarium Theater) theatrical group while in university. Besides performing in the groups' productions, she works as co-organizer. She uses her birth name in her stage career.

Hazuki made her screen debut in director Takahisa Zeze's 1993 film Modern Story About Bandits a.k.a. The Legend of the Thief. Her role in Toshiya Ueno's Keep on Masturbating: Non-Stop Pleasure (1994) won her the Best New Actress, 2nd Place at the Pink Grand Prix. To pink film audiences she is known less for her beauty than for her strong stage presence and unique vocal performance. Anglophone pink film critic Jasper Sharp notes her "aloof, composed and slightly melancholic figure."

She became closely associated with the work of Toshiki Satō, starring in some of his highest-regarded films, including the Pink Grand Prix Best Film-winners Blissful Genuine Sex: Penetration! (1995) and Adultery Diary: One More Time While I'm Still Wet (1996). Hazuki was given the Best Actress award for her work in both films. Her work in Satō's Apartment Wife: Midday Adultery (1997), Ueno's The Lustful Sister-in-Law 2: Erotic Games (1999) and pink film actor-director Yutaka Ikejima's Obscene Stalker: It Holds in Darkness! (2002) won her the Best Actress Silver Prize in three more of the annual ceremonies.

In recent years Hazuki has appeared in mainstream films such as Man Walking on Snow, which screened in the Un Certain Regard section at the 2001 Cannes Film Festival. The cast listing gives her name as Sayoko Ishii.

Awards and achievements
Pink Grand Prix
Preceded by Kiyomi Itō for Iyarashii hitozuma: nureru	Pink Grand Prix for Best Actress; Hotaru Hazuki; 1995 for Blissful Genuine Sex: Penetration!	Succeeded by Hotaru Hazuki for Adultery Diary: One More Time While I'm Still Wet
Preceded by Hotaru Hazuki for Blissful Genuine Sex: Penetration!	Pink Grand Prix for Best Actress; Hotaru Hazuki; 1996 for Adultery Diary: One More Time While I'm Still Wet	Succeeded by Megumi Makihara for Big Tits * Beautiful Tits * Obscene Tits: Rubbing Competition
