= Love & Loathing & Lulu & Ayano =

- Japanese poster
- Directed by: Hisayasu Satō
- Screenplay by: Naoko Nishida
- Based on: Namae no nai Onnatachi by Atsuhiko Nakamura
- Starring: Norie Yasui; Mayu Sakuma
- Release date: September 4, 2010 (Japan)
- Running time: 105 minutes
- Country: Japan
- Language: Japanese

Love & Loathing & Lulu & Ayano (Japanese: 名前のない女たち, Hepburn: Namae no nai Onnatachi; lit. "Women Without Names") is a 2010 Japanese drama film directed by Hisayasu Satō and based on a book by Atsuhiko Nakamura.

== Plot ==
Lulu and Ayano are porn actresses who encounter issues that derive from working in that industry.

== Cast ==
- Norie Yasui as Lulu
- Mayu Sakuma as Ayano
