= Keep On Masturbating: Non-Stop Pleasure =

- DVD cover for Keep On Masturbating: Non-Stop Pleasure (1994), released as Water God and Crimson Lotus
- Directed by: Toshiya Ueno
- Written by: Takahisa Zeze
- Produced by: Naoki Iwata; Toshiki Satō
- Starring: Takeshi Itō; Hitomi Aikawa
- Cinematography: Yasumasa Konishi
- Edited by: Naoki Kaneko
- Music by: E-tone
- Production company: Kokuei
- Distributed by: Shintōhō Eiga
- Release date: March 4, 1994
- Running time: 55 min.
- Country: Japan
- Language: Japanese

Keep On Masturbating: Non-Stop Pleasure (連続ＯＮＡＮＩＥ 乱れっぱなし, Renzoku onanie: midareppanashi) aka Serial Masturbation: Disorder is a 1994 Japanese Pink film directed by Toshiya Ueno. It was chosen as Best Film of the year at the 1994 Pink Grand Prix ceremony.

== Synopsis ==
A man with a troubled past including incest with a younger sister and the murder of a woman travels to an isolated countryside town in Nagano. There a local who mistakes him for a famous television actor shows him the town's sites, including a strip bar in which the performers remove Heian era costumes. The film's narrative is in an allegorical and disjointed manner with references to Buddhist concepts. The title bears no relation to the story, and there are no masturbation scenes in the film. Loosely based on Kenji Nakagami's short story Aragami.

== Cast ==
- Takeshi Itō (伊藤猛)
- Hitomi Aikawa (相川瞳)
- Hotaru Hazuki (葉月螢)
- Shirō Shimomoto (下元史朗)
- Kazuhiro Sano (佐野和宏)

== Critical reception ==
Besides winning the Best Film of the year at the Pink Grand Prix covering the year 1994, awards for Best Director (Ueno), Best Screenplay (Takahisa Zeze), Best Actor (Takeshi Itō), and Best New Actress, 2nd Place (Hotaru Hazuki) also went to the film.

Anglophone Pink film scholar Jasper Sharp calls the film one of director Ueno's most accomplished. He notes that by winning the Pink Grand Prix with this film, Ueno served as an advance guard for the "new wave" shichifukujin ("Seven Lucky Gods") group of pink film directors who came to prominence after the shitennō ("Four Devils"). In their Japanese Cinema Encyclopedia: The Sex Films, the Weissers call the film "an energetic, anxious-to-please pinku eiga", which "manage[s] to generate some of the most powerful, authentic sex scenes since the golden age of Nikkatsu."

== Availability ==
The film was released on DVD in Japan on April 26, 2002, as Water God and Crimson Lotus (竜神と朱蓮華, Ryūjin to shurenge) aka The Dragon God and Shurenge.

== Bibliography ==
=== English ===
- Renzoku onanie: midareppanashi (1994) at IMDb
- "RENZOKU ONANIE: MIDAREPPANASHI". Complete Index to World Film.
- Sharp, Jasper (2008). Behind the Pink Curtain: The Complete History of Japanese Sex Cinema. Guildford: FAB Press. pp. 291, 311, 317, 364. ISBN 978-1-903254-54-7.
- Weisser, Thomas; Yuko Mihara Weisser (1998). Japanese Cinema Encyclopedia: The Sex Films. Miami: Vital Books : Asian Cult Cinema Publications. p. 375. ISBN 1-889288-52-7.

=== Japanese ===
- 竜神と朱蓮華(1994) (in Japanese). allcinema.net.
- 竜神と朱蓮華 (in Japanese). www.dmm.co.jp.
- "連続ONANIE 乱れっぱなし" (in Japanese). Japanese Movie Database.
- ＮＩＰＰＯＮ ＥＲＯＴＩＣＳ (in Japanese). P.G. Web Site. Archived from the original on March 2, 2007.

New title	Pink Grand Prix for Best Film; 1994	Succeeded by Blissful Genuine Sex: Penetration!
