= Apartment Wife: Moans from Next Door =

2001 film by Toshiki Satō

- DVD cover
- Directed by: Toshiki Satō
- Written by: Shinji Imaoka
- Produced by: Nakato Kinukawa; Kazuhito Morita; Kyōichi Masuko
- Starring: Mao Nakagawa; Tsukasa Saitō
- Cinematography: Yasuhito Hironaka
- Edited by: Naoki Kaneko
- Music by: Isao Yamada
- Production company: Kokuei
- Distributed by: Shintōhō Eiga
- Release date: June 1, 2001
- Running time: 69 min.
- Country: Japan
- Language: Japanese

Apartment Wife: Moans from Next Door (団地妻 隣りのあえぎ, Danchi-zuma: tonari no aegi) aka Empty Room (空き部屋, Akibeya) is a 2001 Japanese pink film directed by Toshiki Satō. It was chosen as Best Film of the year at the Pink Grand Prix ceremony. Shinji Imaoka was awarded Best Screenplay and actress Mao Nakagawa was chosen Best New Actress for their work on this film.

== Cast ==
- Mao Nakagawa
- Tsukasa Saitō
- Yumeka Sasaki
- Yūji Tajiri
- Takeshi Itō

== Home media ==
The film was released on DVD in Japan under its theatrical title on October 25, 2002. Besides an individual release, the DVD was included in a 3-disc Toshiki Satō collection. The Film was released on DVD in the UK under Salvation's Sacrament DVD label on 28 May 2004.

== Bibliography ==
- 団地妻 隣りのあえぎ(2001) (in Japanese). allcinema.net.
- 団地妻 隣りのあえぎ (in Japanese). www.dmm.co.jp.
- 団地妻 隣りのあえぎ (in Japanese). Japanese Movie Database.
- 団地妻 隣りのあえぎ (in Japanese). P.G. Web Site. Archived from the original on 2008-04-19.

Preceded by Sad and Painful Search: Office Lady Essay	Pink Grand Prix for Best Film; 2001	Succeeded by A Saloon Wet with Beautiful Women
