= Perfect Blue: Yume Nara Samete =

Japanese fantasy suspense film

- Theatrical release poster
- Directed by: Toshiki Satō
- Screenplay by: Masahiro Kobayashi
- Based on: Yume nara Samete... by Yoshikazu Takeuchi
- Release date: 24 August 2002 (Japan)
- Running time: 103 minutes
- Country: Japan
- Language: Japanese

Perfect Blue: Yume Nara Samete (Perfect Blue 夢なら醒めて……) is a 2002 Japanese fantasy suspense film directed by Toshiki Satō and based on the novel Yume nara Samete... by Yoshikazu Takeuchi. It was released on 24 August 2002.

== Cast ==
- Ayaka Maeda as Ai
- Makiko Watanabe
- Masahiro Toda
- Nao Ōmori
- Taro Suwa
- Yumi Shimizu

== Reception ==
Jasper Sharp of Midnight Eye wrote that "for the most part Yume Nara Samete is downright boring".
