= Sad and Painful Search: Office Lady Essay =

- DVD cover for Sad and Painful Search- Office Lady Essay (2000)
- Directed by: Tarō Araki
- Written by: Yumi Yoshiyuki
- Starring: Emi Kawana; Yumi Yoshiyuki; Korii Sumisu
- Cinematography: Shōji Shimizu
- Edited by: Shōji Sakai
- Distributed by: OP Eiga
- Release date: June 22, 2000 (Japan)
- Running time: 61 minutes
- Country: Japan
- Language: Japanese

Sad and Painful Search: Office Lady Essay (Japanese: せつなく求めて ＯＬ編, Hepburn: Setsunaku motomete: OL hen) is a 2000 Japanese Pink film directed by Tarō Araki. It was chosen as Best Film of the year at the Pink Grand Prix ceremony. Tomohiro Okada was given the Best Actor award and cinematographer Shōji Shimizu was also awarded for his work on the film at the ceremony.

Writer-actress Yumi Yoshiyuki wrote and directed a sequel to the film released in July of the same year, Sad and Painful Search II: Housewife Essay (Japanese: せつなく求めてII 人妻編, Hepburn: Setsunaku motomete II: hitozuma hen). Yoshiyuki starred in the sequel, which included AV idol Yumika Hayashi.

== Cast ==
- Emi Kawana
- Yumi Yoshiyuki
- Ayumu Tokitō
- Tomohiro Okada
- Kenichirō Tajima
- Korii Sumisu
- Tarō Araki

== Bibliography ==
- "せつなく求めて-OL編-" (in Japanese). www.dmm.co.jp.
- "New Movie: 2000.5～6; せつなく求めて ＯＬ編" (in Japanese). P.G. Web Site.
- せつなく求めて‐ＯＬ編‐ (in Japanese). www.okura-movie.co.jp. Archived from the original on December 25, 2008.
- せつなく求めて ＯＬ篇 (in Japanese). Japanese Movie Database.

Preceded by Office Lady Love Juice	Pink Grand Prix for Best Film; 2000	Succeeded by Apartment Wife: Moans from Next Door
