= Kishu Izuchi =

Japanese screenwriter and film director

Kishu Izuchi (井土紀州, Izuchi Kishū; born 1968) is a film director and screenwriter from Japan. He has often collaborated with Takahisa Zeze.

== Career ==
Izuchi began making films while a student at Hosei University, winning an award at the Tokyo Student Film Festival. He began writing screenplays for pink films while starting his own independent production company, Spiritual Movies. His 8mm directorial film Jesus in Nirvana was released commercially in theaters. His films have been introduced at Frankfurt's Nippon Connection film festival.

== His works ==
=== As director ===
- Jesus in Nirvana (Hyakunen no zesshō), 1998
- Mole’s Festival (Mogura no matsuri), 2010
- Muddy Planet (Doro no wakusei), 2010
- Naomi, 2024

=== As screenwriter ===
- Moon Child

== See also ==
- Haruhiko Arai
- Kojin Karatani- who appears in a documentary film 'Left Alone' directed by Izuchi
