= Yoshikazu Takeuchi =

Japanese author

- 竹内 義和
- Born: February 27, 1955 (age 71); Wakayama Prefecture, Japan
- Occupation: Novelist

Yoshikazu Takeuchi (竹内 義和, Takeuchi Yoshikazu; born February 27, 1955 in Wakayama Prefecture) is a Japanese writer of fan guides and novels, as well as a radio co-host. His work Perfect Blue: Complete Metamorphosis (パーフェクト・ブルー 完全変態, Pāfekuto Burū: Kanzen Hentai) was the basis for the 1997 Satoshi Kon anime film Perfect Blue and a 2002 live-action film titled Perfect Blue: Yume Nara Samete. Takeuchi's book Ultraman Visits the Grave is about a young boy who happens to be a fan of Ultraman. Takeuchi has expressed interest in getting his work translated for an English-speaking audience.

Seven Seas Entertainment published English-language versions of his Perfect Blue novels in 2018.

== Bibliography ==
- The Encyclopedia of World Monsters (世界の妖怪全百科, Sekai no Yōkai Zen Hyakka) (1982, Shogakukan)
- The History of Toho Special Effects Movies (1983)
- Perfect Blue: Complete Metamorphosis (パーフェクト・ブルー 完全変態, Pāfekuto Burū: Kanzen Hentai) (March 1991) (ISBN 4-89-595022-0)
- Perfect Blue 1998 (パーフェクト・ブルー１９９８, Pāfekuto Burū 1998) (March 1998, Metamor Publishing) (ISBN 4-89-595192-8) (reprint of Perfect Blue: Complete Metamorphosis)
- Perfect Blue: Awaken from a Dream (2002)
- The Promise of Gachopon (2009)
- Wanting to meet Arashi (2010)
- Ultraman Visits the Grave (November 2011)
