= I Thought About You (film) =

- DVD cover
- Directed by: Yukio Kitazawa
- Written by: Yukio Kitazawa
- Starring: Yōta Kawase
- Cinematography: Kazuhiro Suzuki
- Edited by: Yukio Kitazawa
- Music by: Taoka
- Distributed by: Iizumi Productions / ENK
- Release date: January 3, 1997
- Running time: 61 min.
- Country: Japan
- Language: Japanese

I Thought About You (思いはあなただけ, Omoi wa anata dake) is a 1997 Japanese Pink film directed by Yukio Kitazawa. It was chosen as Best Film of the year at the Pink Grand Prix ceremony.

== Synopsis ==
A gay pink film about two detectives who investigate a gang rape after a video is sent to their office.

== Cast ==
- Yōta Kawase
- Osamu Shimokawa
- Kyōsuke Sasaki
- Hajime Mao
- Hotaru Hazuki

== Reception ==
The pink film community chose I Thought About You as the Best Film of the year at the Pink Grand Prix—the first, and, as of 2009, only gay pink film to be so awarded.

Anglophone pink film authority Jasper Sharp judges that the violence in I Thought About You—particularly the video of the gang rape which the detectives receive—will be difficult viewing for most audiences, gay or straight. As one of the gay ENK studio's most highly regarded films, Sharp notes that I Thought About You sheds light on the violence against women often portrayed, and often criticized in "straight" pink films. Sharp writes, "If these films had laid themselves open to criticism for the often rough treatment the female characters received at the hands of men, the violence contained within them seems relatively restrained compared to gay porno's images of man-on-man brutality, rough sado-masochistic lovemaking and frequent scenes of violent sexual assault."

== Bibliography ==
=== English ===
- Sharp, Jasper (2008). Behind the Pink Curtain: The Complete History of Japanese Sex Cinema. Guildford: FAB Press. pp. 304, 347. ISBN 978-1-903254-54-7.

=== Japanese ===
- 思いはあなただけ ～I Thought About You～(1997) (in Japanese). allcinema.net.
- 思いはあなただけ ～I Thought About You～ (in Japanese). Japanese Movie Database.

Preceded by Adultery Diary: One More Time While I'm Still Wet	Pink Grand Prix for Best Film; 1998	Succeeded by Moon Light Dinner
