= Naked Blood =

1996 Japanese horror film directed by Hisayasu Satō

- DVD cover (US Region 1 version)
- Directed by: Hisayasu Satō
- Written by: Taketoshi Watari
- Produced by: Hirohiko Satō
- Starring: Misa Aika; Yumika Hayashi; Mika Kirihara; Sadao Abe
- Cinematography: Akiko Ashizawa
- Music by: Kimitake Hiraoka
- Distributed by: Museum K.K.
- Release date: February 20, 1996 (Japan)
- Running time: 76 minutes
- Country: Japan
- Language: Japanese

Splatter: Naked Blood (Japanese: ネケッドブラーッド女虐 (女虐: NAKED BLOOD), Hepburn: Naked Blood: Megyaku), literally, Naked Blood: Mischief, is a 1996 Japanese body horror film directed by Hisayasu Satō. It is a remake of Satō's 1987 film, Genuine Rape (暴行本番, Boko honban), and, according to AllMovie, "contains one of the most appalling scenes in Japanese horror."

== Plot ==
A scientist named Eiji has developed a new chemical called "MySon" that can turn pain into pleasure and also drastically increases the pain threshold of those who receive the drug, causing them to become immune to pain. He decides to put three girls who attend a different experiment held by Eiji's mother—this experiment involving a clinical trial of a soon-to-be-released contraceptive—to the test. Meanwhile, Eiji has a crush on one of the girls, Rika. MySon influences the girls gradually, and Eiji discovers that his experiment is going horribly wrong when he finds out the drug results in too many endorphins being produced in the bodies of the people who take it when they become injured, causing them to develop an addiction to the endorphins and a tolerance to the chemical. Thus, to experience the same amount of pleasure, the test subjects begin to inflict greater and greater harm on themselves to experience the same effect. Despite the experiment beginning to run out of control, Eiji opts to simply observe what happens next.

The first woman, who regularly indulges in gluttony, wishes to have the best food in the world, but she ends up cooking and consuming various parts of her body, notably, her labia. The second woman, who is extremely vain and self-conscious, wishes to have the thinnest and most beautiful body in the world. However, noticing hairs and pores all over her body, she tries to mutilate herself, piercing her skin all over with needles and jewellery before Rika intervenes. Shortly afterwards, both the first and second of the three women are found dead.

Rika does not seem to be influenced by MySon, but Eiji finds out that it has turned her into a homicidal murderer who gets enjoyment from witnessing the pain and suffering of her victims, and that she killed the other two girls and his mother. The two engage in sexual intercourse, but Rika then stabs Eiji to death.

Eiji's mother is frequently visited by his father in the afterlife. Eventually, he pulls open her abdomen (which was cut open previously by Rika) and climbs inside. In the final scene, set several years later, Rika and her young son, also named Eiji, have apparently perfected MySon, and depart on a motorcycle to administer a vaporised version of the drug to the population of a city.

== Cast ==
- Misa Aika as Rika
- Yumika Hayashi as Gluttonous Woman
- Mika Kirihara as Vain Woman
- Sadao Abe as Eiji Kure
- Masumi Nakao as Yuki Kure, Eiji's mother
- Tadashi Shiraishi as Eiji's father
- Seiya Hiramatsu as Eiji, the son of Eiji Kure and Rika

== See also ==
- Japanese horror

== Bibliography ==
- McRoy, Jay (2005). "Cultural Transformation; Corporeal Prohibitions and Body Horror in Sato Hisayasu's Naked Blood". In McRoy, Jay (ed.). Japanese Horror Cinema. Honolulu: University of Hawaii Press. ISBN 0-8248-2990-5.
- McRoy, Jay (2008). Nightmare Japan: contemporary Japanese horror cinema. Contemporary cinema. Vol. 4. Rodopi. pp. 49–59. ISBN 978-90-420-2331-4.
- Firsching, Robert. "Megyaku: Naked Blood". Allmovie.
- 女虐／ＮＡＫＥＤ ＢＬＯＯＤ (in Japanese). Japanese Movie Database.
