= Kokkuri-san (film) =

- DVD cover
- Directed by: Takahisa Zeze
- Written by: Kishu Izuchi; Takahisa Zeze
- Produced by: Shigehiro Arake; Minoru Yokote
- Starring: Ayumi Yamatsu; Hiroko Shimada; Moe Ishikawa
- Cinematography: Shogo Ueno
- Edited by: Shinichi Fushima
- Music by: Goro Yasukawa
- Release date: 1997
- Running time: 87 minutes
- Country: Japan
- Language: Japanese

Kokkuri (Japanese: こっくりさん, Hepburn: Kokkuri: Kokkuri-san) is a 1997 Japanese film directed by Takahisa Zeze about three girls, Mio, Hiroko, and Masami, who attempt to summon a spirit through a divination game.

== Plot ==
A group of friends play the Japanese game Kokkuri to summon Kokkuri-san, a spirit who can answer any question as a pastime but apparently reveals dark secrets that will make these girls turn against each other.

== Cast & Crew ==
Screenplay by:

- Rikiya Mizushima
- Isao Kiriyama

Executive Producers:

- Tomozo Yamaguchi
- Tatsuo Uruga

Producer:

- Kazuyuki Kobayashi
- Minoru Yokote
- Shigehiro Arake

Screenplay:

- Takahisa Zeze
- Kishu Izuchi

Director:

- Takahisa Zeze

Lighting:

- Shinichi Hayashi

Supervising Production Designer:

- Yoshinobu Nishioka

Art Director:

- Hisayuki Kobayashi

Music:

- Goro Yasukawa
- Sound Director:
- Atsushi Sugiyama

Editing:

- Shinichi Fushima

Cast:

- Ayumi Yamatsu
- Hiroko Shimada
- Moe Ishikawa

== Release ==
It was distributed in the United States by AsiaVision, the Asian live action label of Urban Vision Entertainment.
