= Perfect Blue =

1997 Japanese animated film by Satoshi Kon

- Theatrical release poster
- Directed by: Satoshi Kon
- Screenplay by: Sadayuki Murai
- Based on: Perfect Blue: Complete Metamorphosis by Yoshikazu Takeuchi
- Produced by: Masao Maruyama; Hitomi Nakagaki; Yoshihisa Ishihara; Yutaka Tōgō; Hiroaki Inoue
- Starring: Junko Iwao; Rica Matsumoto; Shiho Niiyama; Masaaki Okura; Shinpachi Tsuji; Emiko Furukawa
- Cinematography: Hisao Shirai
- Edited by: Harutoshi Ogata
- Music by: Masahiro Ikumi
- Production company: Madhouse
- Distributed by: Rex Entertainment
- Release dates: August 5, 1997 (Fantasia); February 28, 1998 (Japan)
- Running time: 81 minutes
- Country: Japan
- Language: Japanese
- Budget: ¥90 million (US$830,442)
- Box office: $3 million €572,669 (Italy rerelease)

Perfect Blue (Japanese: パーフェクトブルー, Hepburn: Pāfekuto Burū) is a 1997 Japanese animated psychological thriller film directed by Satoshi Kon. It is loosely based on the novel Perfect Blue: Complete Metamorphosis (パーフェクトブルー：完全変態, Pāfekuto Burū: Kanzen Hentai) by Yoshikazu Takeuchi, with a screenplay by Sadayuki Murai. Featuring the voices of Junko Iwao, Rica Matsumoto, Shiho Niiyama, Masaaki Okura, Shinpachi Tsuji and Emiko Furukawa, the plot follows a member of a Japanese idol group who retires from music to pursue an acting career. As she becomes a victim of stalking by her obsessive fan, gruesome murders take place, and she begins losing her grip on reality. The film deals with the blurring of the line between fantasy and reality, a commonly found theme in Kon's other works, such as Millennium Actress (2001), Paranoia Agent (2004), and Paprika (2006).

The film garnered critical acclaim and is now regarded as a masterpiece of animation and one of the greatest animated films of all time.

== Plot ==
Mima Kirigoe decides to leave the J-pop idol group CHAM! to become a full-time actress. Many of her fans are dismayed by her change from a clean-cut image, particularly an obsessive fan, Me-Mania, who begins stalking her. Following directions from a fan letter, Mima discovers a website called "Mima's Room" comprising public diary entries written from her perspective, recording her daily life and private thoughts in great detail. She confides in her manager, former pop idol Rumi Hidaka, about the site, but Rumi advises her to ignore it.

Mima lands a minor role in the television detective drama Double Bind as Yoko Takakura; however, her agent, Tadokoro, lobbies the producers of Double Bind and succeeds in securing Mima a larger part, though her new role requires her to film a rape scene at a strip club. Despite Rumi's objections, Mima accepts the role, but filming the scene proves distressing, prompting Rumi to leave the set in tears, and Tadokoro shows regret. Mima begins to fall into a delirious state during the rape scene. When Mima returns home and learns that her fish have suddenly passed away after irregular feedings, she goes into a rage, destroying her apartment, saying she "of course" didn't want to film the scene but felt she had no choice but to secure her role as an actress. Between the ongoing stresses of filming Double Bind, her lingering regret over leaving CHAM! after learning that her former groupmates' next single without her has become a hit, and the paranoia she experiences from being stalked, Mima is distressed about her double life and begins to suffer from psychosis. She especially struggles to distinguish real life from her acting pursuits, and is repeatedly visited by an apparition of her former idol self, who claims to be "the real Mima."

A string of murders is committed, all against people who have been involved in Mima's acting career in some respect. Mima finds evidence in her closet suggesting her to be the prime suspect. Her increasing mental instability makes her doubt her own memories and innocence, as she vaguely recalls brutally murdering photographer Murano after he implored her to allow him to take naked photos of her. Mima manages to finish shooting Double Bind, the final scene of which reveals that her character killed and assumed the identity of her sister due to trauma-induced dissociative identity disorder. After the filming staff have left the studio, Me-Mania, acting on e-mailed instructions from "the real Mima" to "eliminate the impostor," corners Mima and attempts to rape and kill her, but Mima bludgeons him with a hammer and escapes. Rumi finds Mima beaten and disheveled, prompting her to take Mima to her home. Later, Me-Mania is murdered by "the real Mima" for failing to kill Mima.

Mima awakens, believing Rumi has taken her back to her apartment. She notices the fish are alive and well. Mima discovers that Rumi's bedroom is a replica of her own and realizes that Rumi is the one behind "Mima's Room," the serial murders, and the doppelgänger who manipulated Me-Mania: Displeased by Mima's retirement from the idol industry, Rumi's underlying schizophrenia developed an alternate personality of the "real Mima", now seeking to destroy and replace her in order to redeem her image. As Rumi pursues Mima through the city, Mima pulls Rumi's wig off resulting in Rumi unintentionally impaling herself on a glass shard during the struggle. Rumi stumbles into the street and the path of an oncoming truck; hallucinating the headlights as stage lights, she smiles and poses instead of moving out of the way, but Mima tackles her, allowing Rumi to be apprehended.

Sometime later, Mima, now established as an actress, visits Rumi in a mental institution. Rumi's doctor says Rumi still believes she is a pop idol most of the time. Mima says she has learned a lot from her experiences with Rumi. As Mima leaves the hospital, she overhears two nurses, who recognize her but conclude that she must be a look-alike, as the real Mima Kirigoe would have no reason to visit a mental institution. As Mima enters her car, she smiles at herself in the rear-view mirror before declaring, "No, I'm the real thing".

== Cast ==
Character	Japanese	English
Main characters
Mima Kirigoe (霧越 未麻, Kirigoe Mima)	Junko Iwao	Ruby Marlowe
Rumi Hidaka (日高 ルミ, Hidaka Rumi)	Rica Matsumoto	Wendee Lee
Mamoru Uchida (Me-Mania) (内田 守, Uchida Mamoru)	Masaaki Ōkura	Bob Marx
Television drama personnel
Tejima (手嶋)	Yōsuke Akimoto	–
Takao Shibuya (渋谷 貴雄, Shibuya Takao)	Yoku Shioya	–
Kenichi Sakuragi (桜木 健一, Sakuragi Ken'ichi)	Hideyuki Hori	Sparky Thornton
Eri Ochiai (落合 恵理, Ochiai Eri)	Emi Shinohara	–
Murano (村野)	Masashi Ebara	–
Director (監督, Kantoku)	Kiyoyuki Yanada	–
Assistant Director	Kyousei Tsukui	–
CHAM personnel
Tadokoro (田所)	Shinpachi Tsuji	Gil Starberry
Yada (矢田)	Tōru Furusawa	–
Yukiko (雪子)	Emiko Furukawa	–
Rei (レイ)	Shiho Niiyama	–
Electric Soldiers Powertron (電脳戦士パワートロン, Dennou Senshi Pawātoron)
Red (レッド, Reddo)	Kōichi Tōchika	–
Green (グリーン, Gurīn)	Sōichirō Hoshi	–
Blue (ブルー, Burū)	Kishō Taniyama	–
Other characters
Tadashi Doi (土居 正, Doi Tadashi)	Akio Suyama	–
Taku (タク)	Shin-ichiro Miki	–
Salaryman (サラリーマン, Sararīman)	Osamu Hosoi	–
Child (子供, Kodomo)	Megumi Tano	–
Child (子供, Kodomo)	Emi Motoi	–
Reporter (レポーター, Repōtā)	Kaori Minami	–
Reporter (レポーター, Repōtā)	Makoto Kitano	–
Presenter (司会者, Shikaisha)	Shocker OH!NO!	–

The following actors in the English adaptation are listed in the credits without specification to their respective roles: James Lyon, Frank Buck, David Lucas, Elliot Reynolds, Kermit Beachwood, Sam Strong, Carol Stanzione, Ty Webb, Billy Regan, Dari Mackenzie, George C. Cole, Syd Fontana, Sven Nosgard, Bob Marx, Devon Michaels, Robert Wicks and Mattie Rando.

== Analysis ==
In an analysis of Perfect Blue and Kon's other works, professor Susan Napier states that "Perfect Blue announces its preoccupation with perception, identity, voyeurism, and performance — especially in relation to the female — right from its opening sequence. The perception of reality cannot be trusted, with the visual set up only to not be reality, especially as the psychodrama heights towards the climax." Napier also sees themes related to pop idols and their performances as impacting the gaze and the issue of their roles. Mima's madness results from her own subjectivity and attacks on her identity. The ties to Alfred Hitchcock's work are broken with the murder of her male controllers. Otaku describes the film as a "critique of the consumer society of contemporary Japan." (Note: Reference to the quote is provided by Napier as: Jay, "Satoshi Kon", Otaku (May/June 2003):22)

Critics have also noted the film’s deliberate narrative ambiguity. The story frequently blurs the boundaries between Mima’s real life, scenes from the television series Double Bind, and possible hallucinations, creating uncertainty about which events occur objectively and which may be subjective perceptions. Reviewers have described the film as presenting Mima’s experiences through an unreliable perspective that causes viewers to question "where reality ends and delusions begin." Scholars and critics have therefore interpreted the film as exploring the fragmentation of identity and the instability of perception in modern media culture.

== Production ==
This film was Satoshi Kon's first directorial effort. Masao Maruyama, a producer at Madhouse at the time, appreciated Kon's work on the OVA JoJo's Bizarre Adventure and contacted him to ask if he would be interested in directing in the fall of 1994. The original author, Yoshikazu Takeuchi, allegedly first planned a live-action film based on his novel. However, due to funding difficulties, it was downgraded to direct-to-video and then direct-to-video animation. When Kon received the initial offer, it was for an OVA project, so he made Perfect Blue as a video animation. Then, it was decided to be released as a movie in a hurry just before its completion. This work was originally made as a video animation for a narrow market, so it was expected to disappear as soon as a few people talked about it. The fact that such a work was treated as a film, invited to many film festivals around the world, and released as a package in many countries was unexpected for those involved. Psychological horror was not a mainstream genre in Japanese animation, and there was no precedent for it at the time, so it would normally have been rejected.

By the time Kon was offered the job, the title Perfect Blue and the content, a story about a B-class idol and a perverted fan had already been set. He had not read the original novel and only read the script for the film, which was said to be close to the original and was never used in the final film. There is no play-within-a-play in the original story, nor is there a motif of blurring the boundary between dream and reality. The first plot was a simple splatter/psycho-horror story about an idol girl that is attacked by a perverted fan who cannot tolerate her image change, and there were also many depictions of bleeding, so it was not suitable for Kon who does not like horror or idols. Kon said that if he were free to make a plan, he would never have thought of such a setting. This genre was overused, having already been dealt with in various works such as Se7en, Basic Instinct and The Silence of the Lambs and was also something that anime was not good at. Since most of the works in that genre pursue how perverted or crazy the perpetrators, the murderers, are, Kon focused on "how the inner world of the protagonist, the victim, is broken by being targeted by the stalker" in order to outsmart the audience. On the other hand, the play within a play, Double Bind, is more like a parody than a straight psycho-horror, and he made it with the intention of criticizing Japanese TV dramas that are easily made by imitating Hollywood fads immediately.

Kon decided to take on the role of director because he was attracted by the allure of directing for the first time, and because the original author allowed him to change the story as he liked as long as he kept three things in mind to make the film work: the main character is a B-grade idol, she has a rabid fan (stalker), and it is a horror film. Kon took some elements from the original work, such as the uniquely Japanese existence of idols, the "otaku" fans that surround them, and the stalkers that have become more radical, and came up with as many ideas as possible with the scriptwriter, Sadayuki Murai, with the intention of using them to create a completely new story. To find the film's core motif, Kon came up with the motif of two things that should have a "borderline", such as "dream and reality", "memory and fact", and "oneself and others", becoming borderless and blending together, based on the short film Magnetic Rose (from Memories), for which he had written a script, and the suspended manga Opus. The concept of "memory and fact" in the plot was inspired by the album Sim City by Susumu Hirasawa. He said, "This album is like a city that was suddenly created with a high degree of modernity without any evolutionary process". In the meantime, he came up with the idea that "a character more like 'me' than 'I', the protagonist, to the people around 'me' " is created on the Internet without 'my' knowledge". The character is "the past me" for the protagonist, and this "other me" that should have existed only on the Internet has materialized due to external factors (the consciousness of the fans who want the protagonist to be like that) and internal factors (the protagonist's regret that she might have been more comfortable in the past). And then the composition that the character and the protagonist herself confronted emerged. It was only then that he became convinced that this work could be established as his own video work. Kon decided to interpret the original story above as a story about an idol girl who was broken down by a sudden change in her environment or by a stalker who targets her, and wrote a completely new script with Sadayuki Murai. Initially, Murai wrote the first draft of the script, and Kon added or removed ideas from it. They spent a lot of time discussing, and many of the ideas came out of that. Next, Kon wrote all the storyboards, where he also made changes to dialogue and other elements. The drawing work was also carried out in parallel.

The company that purchased the videogram and television rights to Perfect Blue before the film was completed advised the distributor to submit the film to the Fantasia International Film Festival in Montreal, Canada, so that it could be released overseas first. Since it was his first film, director Kon was still unknown. Therefore, the distributor introduced the film as the first directorial effort of a disciple of Katsuhiro Otomo, the creator of Akira, which had already become a hit overseas. Otomo is credited as a planning collaborator, but he never arranged for the company to ask Kon to direct the film, nor was he involved in the film. However, Otomo apparently once advised the original author about the circumstances of the animation industry when he was touting around the animation project. At Fantasia, the film was so well received that a second screening was hurriedly arranged for those who could not see it, and it was eventually voted by the audience as the best international film. This acclaim brought the distributor invitations from more than 50 film festivals, including in Germany, Sweden, Australia, and South Korea. The distributor began negotiations with distributors in various European countries and eventually succeeded in selling the film in major markets such as Spanish, French, Italian, English and German-speaking countries prior to its release in Japan. The distributor was successful in obtaining permission from filmmakers Roger Corman and Irvin Kershner to use their comments in recommending the film free of charge worldwide. As a result, their comments were used on international theater flyers and in worldwide promotions.

== Release ==
Perfect Blue premiered on August 5, 1997, at the Fantasia Film Festival in Montreal, Canada, and had its general release in Japan on February 28, 1998.

The film was also released on UMD by Anchor Bay Entertainment on December 6, 2005. It featured the film in widescreen, leaving the film kept within black bars on the PSP's 16:9 screen. This release also contains no special features and only the English audio track. The film was released on Blu-ray and DVD in Region B by Anime Limited in 2013. In the U.S., Perfect Blue aired on the Encore cable television network and was featured by the Sci Fi Channel on December 10, 2007, as part of its Ani-Monday block. In Australia, Perfect Blue aired on the SBS Television Network on April 12, 2008, and previously sometime in mid 2007 in a similar timeslot.

The film had a theatrical re-release in the United States by GKIDS on September 6 and 10, 2018, with both English dubbed and subtitled screenings. GKIDS and Shout! Factory released the film on Blu-ray Disc in North America on March 26, 2019. The film received a wide theatrical release in Finland in 2025. GKIDS screened a 4K restoration of the film in US theaters on October 3, 2025.

In the United Kingdom and Ireland, Anime Limited released the new 4K restoration theatrically on 10 October 2025, followed by a Deluxe Edition 4K UHD release.

== Reception and legacy ==
The film was well received critically in the festival circuit, winning awards at the 1997 Fantasia Festival in Montréal, and Fantasporto Film Festival in Portugal.

Critical response in the United States upon its theatrical release was also positive. As of October 2026, the film holds an 88% approval rating on Rotten Tomatoes based on 59 reviews, with an average score of 7.4/10. The consensus states: "Perfect Blue is overstylized, but its core mystery is always compelling, as are the visual theatrics". On Metacritic, the film has a score of 67 based on 17 reviews, indicating "generally favorable reviews". Time included the film on its Top 5 Anime film list, Total Film ranked Perfect Blue twenty-fifth on their list of greatest animated films, and /Film named it the scariest animated film ever. It also made the list for Entertainment Weekly's best movies never seen from 1991 to 2011. In 2022, IndieWire named Perfect Blue the twelfth best movie of the 1990s.

Dennis Harvey of Variety wrote that, while the film "ultimately disappoints with its just-middling tension and underdeveloped scenario, it still holds attention by trying something different for the genre". Hoai-Tran Bui of /Film called Perfect Blue "deeply violent, both physically and emotionally", writing that "this is a film that will leave you with profound psychological scars, and the feeling that you want to take a long, long shower". Bob Graham of the San Francisco Chronicle noted the film's ability to "take the thriller, media fascination, psychological insight and pop culture and stand them all on their heads" via its "knowing, adult view of what seems to be a young-teenage paradise". Writing for Anime News Network, reviewer Tim Henderson described the film as "a dark, sophisticated psychological thriller" with its effect of "over-obsession funneled through early Internet culture" and produces a "reminder of how much celebrity fandom has evolved in only a decade". Reviewing the 2019 GKIDS Blu-ray release, Neil Lumbard of Blu-ray.com heralded Perfect Blue as "one of the greatest anime films of all time" and "a must-see masterpiece that helped to pave the way for more complex anime films to follow", while Chris Beveridge of The Fandom Post noted that "this is not a film one can watch often overall, nor should you, but when you settle into it you put everything else away, turn down the lights, and savor an excellent piece of filmmaking". In a contemporary review for Sight and Sound, Jonathan Romney praised the film's treatment of celebrity, fan fantasy and the emerging internet, describing it as a "culturally astute invention" and highlighting its visual blurring of reality and fantasy.

American performer Madonna incorporated clips from Perfect Blue into a remix of her song "What It Feels Like for a Girl" as a video interlude during her Drowned World Tour in 2001.

American director Darren Aronofsky was rumored to have purchased the remake rights for Perfect Blue. However, when he spoke with Kon in a magazine in 2001, he stated that he had to abandon the purchase for various reasons. His 2000 film Requiem for a Dream pays homage to Perfect Blue in some of its angles and shots, including a remake of the bathtub scene. Aronofsky acknowledged the similarities to Perfect Blue in his 2010 film Black Swan, but denied that Black Swan was inspired by Perfect Blue. A re-issued blog entry mentioned Requiem for a Dream as being among Kon's list of films he viewed for 2010. In addition, Kon blogged about his meeting with Aronofsky in 2001.

Perfect Blue made USA Today's top 100 Animated films, notably praised by an editor on Kubo and the Two Strings.

== Other media ==
Seven Seas Entertainment obtained the English-language publication rights for the 1991 novel Perfect Blue: Complete Metamorphosis and the 1995 anthology (re-released in 2002 under the current title) Perfect Blue: Awaken from a Dream in April 2017. They released the translated novels in December 2017 and April 2018, respectively.

== See also ==
- List of films featuring fictional films
