= Mariya Suzuki =

Japanese idol, singer and actress (born 1991)

Mariya Suzuki 鈴木 まりや
- Born: April 29, 1991 (age 35); Saitama Prefecture, Japan
- Genres: J-pop
- Occupations: Japanese idol, singer, actress

Mariya Suzuki (鈴木 まりや, Suzuki Mariya; born April 29, 1991) is a Japanese idol, singer and actress. She joined the girl group AKB48 in 2009 where she participated in a number of their singles, and was one of two Japanese members to transfer and to become founding members of the Chinese idol sister group SNH48 in 2012. She then was a concurrent member of both AKB48 and SNH48 from 2013 to 2016, after which she returned to AKB48 until she graduated from the group in 2017. She has starred in three horror films. In March 2019, Suzuki Mariya join new idol group called Sotsugyosei Tokyo.

== Filmography ==
- Kokkuri-san: Gekijoban (2011), Eri Ōshima
- 2-channel no Noroi: Shin Gekijōban, Honki (2012), Yūka Kinami
- Kokkuri-san Movie - Shin Toshi Densetsu - (2014), Mari
- Miss Machiko (2018)
