= Kokkuri-san: Gekijoban =

- Directed by: Jirō Nagae
- Screenplay by: Jiro Nagae
- Starring: Mariya Suzuki; Asuka Kataoka; Shizuka Umemoto
- Release date: November 26, 2011
- Country: Japan
- Language: Japanese

Kokkuri-san: Gekijoban (こっくりさん 劇場版) is a 2011 Japanese horror film directed by Jirō Nagae, starring Mariya Suzuki and involving the game of Kokkuri.

== Plot ==
The remains of a child lost for 38 years become found in a mountain forest near his hometown. They belong to Yano, a newcomer the other children thought to be weird for his obsession with kokkuri, a Japanese form of ouija. He got the other students so addicted to engaging in it that they began to go insane. When their teacher forbade kokkuri, Yano used it to curse the teacher and cause him to have a car accident. The other students bullied the boy, taking him up a mountain road to a steep embankment. One of them told him that he had to jump off to atone for hurting the teacher. When he hesitated, she pushed him. He broke his legs, but they abandoned him after photographing him. They told no one because they thought the police would find him, but in his disorientation, Yano crawled into the woods and died.

After the discovery of his remains, the gang that tormented him begin quickly to die off. One of them has a daughter in high school, Oshima Eri. Her teacher, who has had experience with a student being possessed, recognizes the danger surrounding the girl and tries to help. The girl also meets Makise, the adult son of one of the gang of tormentors. Getting to know him, the girl finds out that he has a 2 year-old baby. Makise learns about the gang and who the members were and finds the last living one. He tells the pair what happened. He, the last of the gang, is found dead at the embankment but then Makise is also found dead in his own home. The teacher tells the girl that Yano's spirit is so hate-filled that he's cursed not only the gang, but their living descendants. The only way to stop this is to call other spirits, called kokkuri-san, to come and take him away. Eri and the teacher try, but realize they need the kokkuri equipment the boy used. They get it and take it to where he died and they use kokkuri to shift the girl into the spirit realm where the boy is. She then uses kokkuri to summon spirits to come and take they boy's spirit to where it belongs. Yano's spirit approaches Eri and she is suddenly shot back into the normal world. She says it all went well and the boy was sent away. The teacher drives Eri home and gives her the next day off of school, but expects to see her the day after that. Driving to her own home, she hears on the radio that a 2 year-old baby has mysteriously died and murder is suspected. Then she hears the Eri's voice coming out of the radio, yelling that she's trapped and can't get back. The teacher brakes the car and the scene shifts to Eri standing where the teacher had dropped her off. The irises in her eyes have changed to bluish-white as an evil expression spreads over her face.

== Cast ==
- Mariya Suzuki as Eri
- Asuka Kataoka
- Shizuka Umemoto

== See also ==
- Kokkuri-san Movie - Shin Toshi Densetsu -
