= Gugure! Kokkuri-san =

Japanese manga series

- Cover of Gugure! Kokkuri-san volume 1 by Square Enix

繰繰れ！コックリさん
- Genre: Comedy; Supernatural
- Manga
- Written by: Midori Endō
- Published by: Square Enix
- Magazine: Gangan Joker
- Original run: 2011 – 2016
- Volumes: 12 + 1
- Anime television series
- Directed by: Yoshimasa Hiraike
- Written by: Yoshimasa Hiraike
- Music by: Hajime Hyakkoku
- Studio: TMS Entertainment
- Licensed by: NA: Sentai Filmworks
- Original network: TV Tokyo, TVO, TVA, TSC, TVh, TVQ, AT-X
- Original run: October 5, 2014 – December 21, 2014
- Episodes: 12 +11 OVA
- Manga

Gugure! Shigaraki-san
- Written by: Midori Endō
- Published by: Square Enix
- Magazine: Gangan Joker
- Original run: August 22, 2014 – January 22, 2016
- Volumes: 4

Gugure! Kokkuri-san (繰繰れ! コックリさん; "Repeat! Kokkuri-san") is a Japanese manga series by Midori Endō, serialized in Square Enix's Gangan Joker since 2011. It has been collected in 12 (plus 1) tankōbon volumes until 2016 when it ended. An anime television series adaptation by TMS Entertainment aired in Japan from October to December 2014.

== Plot ==
Kohina Ichimatsu is an expressionless elementary school girl who lives alone, proclaims herself to be a doll, and eats nothing but instant noodles. One day, she plays the Kokkuri game by herself and summons the fox spirit Kokkuri-san who, upon seeing her unhealthy lifestyle, takes it upon himself to become her guardian and raise her properly. Thus starts Kohina's new life of being haunted by various unique spirits.

== Characters ==
=== Main characters ===
Kohina Ichimatsu (市松 こひな, Ichimatsu Kohina)
Voiced by: Ryō Hirohashi
Kohina is an emotionless and eccentric girl living by herself in a house. She explains her lack of emotions and normal responses by claiming to be a living doll. She is obsessed with cup noodles, even having a wide variety of special edition noodles that she had hidden away until Kokkuri-san confiscated them and returned them to the store. She is usually seen in her chibi form and possessing rectangular shaped eyes.
Narrator
Voiced by: Yukari Tamura
Kokkuri-san (コックリさん)
Voiced by: Daisuke Ono (male), Ryoko Shiraishi (female)
A handsome fox spirit who was summoned by Kohina. He knew Kohina before this incident as Kohina would often visit his shrine, despite its ruined state. After seeing how she lives as a 'doll' and wanting to help her, Kokkuri began to haunt Kohina. Convinced that her current life wasn't suitable for a young girl, he became her legal guardian. He often fights with Inugami over Kohina and her affections. Despite being an ancient spirit, Kokkuri has adjusted to modern life with incredible ease.
Inugami (狗神)
Voiced by: Takahiro Sakurai (male), Chiwa Saitō (female)
A dog spirit who adores Kohina because she was the only person to acknowledge Inugami when they were still a real dog. This leads to Kokkuri-san and Inugami often fighting with one another. Inugami owns a pair of handguns that they use when angered or challenged, and can even use them when in their tiny dog form.
Shigaraki (信楽)
Voiced by: Jōji Nakata
An old tanuki spirit who is very lazy, drinks a lot, and is determined to keep his NEET lifestyle intact. At some point in the past he was once Kokkuri-san's roommate. Despite his bad behavior, he can't stand to see someone in trouble, especially girls and children. For example, Shigaraki used his pachinko winnings to fund an orphanage inhabited by the children whose families he ruined financially. He also cares for Kohina deeply and allowed a violent spirit she had befriended to curse him so that she wouldn't have to see him kill it. He appears to be interested in both Kokkuri-san and Inugami's female forms. Shigaraki occasionally dresses as Kohina, and his tanuki form was once taken to be so real (and scary) that he later changed the appearance to be cuter so he would be more popular.

=== Other characters ===
Tama-san (タマ)
Voiced by: Yukana
A cat spirit who is the poster girl for a failing traditional sweets shop. She has a strong obsession with dolls, which leads to a stalker-like fixation on Kohina. Her store is destitute because of her massive collection of broken and haunted dolls as well as all of her sweets being tailored to her tastes rather than that of any of her customers.
Jimeko-chan (じめ子さん; lit. 'Miss Bully')
Voiced by: Hisako Kanemoto
Kohina's classmate who is described as a shy tsundere. Having never had a friend in her life, her attempts to get Kohina to be her friend led her to become a self-proclaimed bully who often puts flowers on Kohina's desk.
Yamamoto-kun (山本君)
Voiced by: Kazutomi Yamamoto
A student from Kohina's school, who resembles a Grey alien. He looks and behaves very much like an alien, and Kokkuri believes him to be one, but Kohina is convinced that he is a "normal Earthling." Although he appears to be an alien, he is friendly and interacts with his schoolmates normally.
Tengu (天狗)
Voiced by: Kōsuke Toriumi
A tengu spirit who is well-versed in local history, although he is only willing to assist Kokkuri-san in exchange for pictures of cup noodles.
Kureha (紅葉)
Voiced by: Rina Satō
The ghost of a woman who is bound to the maple tree where she waited for her boyfriend to return. She later discovers her boyfriend was reborn as the very same tree.

== Media ==
=== Manga ===
Gugure! Kokkuri-san

No.	Release date	ISBN
1	December 22, 2011	978-4-7575-3450-6
2	July 27, 2012	978-4-7575-3632-6
3	October 22, 2012	978-4-7575-3756-9
4	March 22, 2013	978-4-7575-3906-8
5	August 22, 2013	978-4-7575-3957-0
6	March 22, 2014	978-4-7575-4255-6
7	September 22, 2014	978-4-7575-4419-2
8	December 22, 2014	978-4-7575-4507-6
8.5	December 22, 2014	978-4-7575-4460-4
9	May 22, 2015	978-4-7575-4488-8
10	November 22, 2015	—
11	March 21, 2017	—
12	January 21, 2017	—

Gugure! Shigaraki-san

No.	Release date	ISBN
1	December 22, 2014	—
2	May 23, 2015	—
3	November 22, 2015	—
4	March 21, 2016	—

=== Anime ===
An anime television series adaptation by TMS Entertainment aired in Japan between October 5, 2014, and December 21, 2014, and was simulcast by Crunchyroll. The opening theme is "Welcome!! DISCO Kemokemoke" (Welcome!!DISCOけもけもけ), performed by the voice actors Daisuke Ono, Takahiro Sakurai and Jōji Nakata while the ending theme "This Merry-Go-Round Song" performed by Suemitsu Atsushi.

==== Episode list ====
No.	Title	Original release date
1	"Doll Girl Meets Kokkuri-san!"; Transliteration: "Ningyō Shōjo Mītsu Kokkuri-san!" (Japanese: 人形少女・ミーツ・コックリさん!)	October 5, 2014
Kohina Ichimatsu, an expressionless elementary schoolgirl, summons the fox spirit Kokkuri-san whilst playing the Kokkuri game by herself. Kokkuri, finding Kohina to be living an unhealthy lifestyle, takes it upon himself to be her guardian.
2	"A Refreshing Smile is the First Step to Being a Decent Person!"; Transliteration: "Sawayaka Egao wa Maningen e no Daiippo!" (Japanese: 爽やか笑顔は真人間への第一歩!)	October 12, 2014
Kokkuri tries to teach Kohina to smile, whilst Kohina is approached by an overly loyal dog spirit named Inugami.
3	"Inugami, Stay! Go to Your House!"; Transliteration: "Inugami Sutei Hausu!" (Japanese: 狗神ステイハウス!)	October 19, 2014
Inugami starts haunting Kohina, causing stress on Kokkuri.
4	"The One on My Mind is into Sci-Fi!"; Transliteration: "Kininaru Aitsu wa SF-kei!" (Japanese: 気になるアイツはSF系!)	October 26, 2014
The house is now haunted by the tanuki spirit, Shigaraki, who has an unexpected use for Kokkuri's life savings.
5	"The Flowers on the Desk are a Message!"; Transliteration: "Tsukue no Ohana wa Messēji!" (Japanese: 机のお花はメッセージ!)	November 2, 2014
Kohina discovers that her classmate, dubbed Jimeko-san, is the one who had been putting flowers on her desk.
6	"Kohina, the Cyclops, and Shigaraki!"; Transliteration: "Kohina to Hitotsume to Shigaraki!" (Japanese: こひなと一つ目と信楽!)	November 9, 2014
As Kohina starts being able to see more spirits, she starts to raise a small Cyclops, despite warnings from the others.
7	"Cat God Tama's Love at First Sight!"; Transliteration: "Nekogami Tama no Hitomebore!" (Japanese: 猫神タマの一目惚れ！)	November 16, 2014
Tama, a cat god obsessed with dolls, takes an interest in Kohina, who she believes to be an actual doll, and kidnaps her. Later, Kokkuri finds a cursed box in the family storehouse that turns him into a woman.
8	"Kokkuri-san's Steamy Secret Hot Spring Tour!"; Transliteration: "Kokkuri-san no Yukemuri Onsen Meguri!" (Japanese: コックリさんの湯けむり温泉めぐり!)	November 23, 2014
Still stuck as a woman, Kokkuri reluctantly accompanies Shigaraki and the others to a hot springs town in the hope of finding a legendary hot spring that can undo the curse.
9	"The Age of Many Worries!"; Transliteration: "Nayami Ōki To-shi-go-ro!" (Japanese: 悩み多きト・シ・ゴ・ロ！)	November 30, 2014
When Kokkuri starts losing hairs, he tries to keep his stress to a minimum to keep himself from going bald. Later, Inugami tries to catch the attention of Kohina to no avail, leading him to run away from home.
10	"Kureha's Days Spent Waiting in Vain!"; Transliteration: "Kureha Machibōke no Hibi!" (Japanese: 紅葉待ちぼうけの日々！)	December 7, 2014
Kokkuri and Kohina meet a strange woman named Kureha waiting under a mysterious red maple tree. To find out more information on the man she is waiting for, the gang visit the mountain god Tengu, who informs them that Kureha is a ghost who died waiting for a man who will never come and is bound to the tree. Wanting to help Kureha pass on to the afterlife, Kokkuri looks up his spirit, learning he was actually reborn as the maple tree the entire time.
11	"Adult Dropout Cosplay!"; Transliteration: "Otona Duroppuauto Kosupure!" (Japanese: 大人ドロップアウトコスプレ!)	December 14, 2014
As a result of drinking Kokkuri's water of youth, Inugami and Shigaraki end up turning into children. After growing tired of being their parent, Kokkuri uses the water on himself to become a child himself, so Kohina brings in Tama to look after them.
12	"Destiny!" (Japanese: DESTINY!)	December 21, 2014
Kokkuri and Kohina end up helping a nervous lawyer pick out a Christmas present for his daughter, Noelle. After being able to have a Christmas party with his daughter, the lawyer reveals he is a ghost who wanted to make one final memory passing on. Later, the group see the New Year in with some cleaning, soba, and a shrine visit.
