= Blissful Genuine Sex: Penetration! =

- Directed by: Toshiki Satō
- Written by: Kenji Fukuma
- Produced by: Naoki Iwata
- Starring: Hotaru Hazuki
- Cinematography: Yasumasa Konishi
- Edited by: Naoki Kaneko
- Music by: E. Tone
- Production company: Kokuei
- Distributed by: Shintōhō Eiga
- Release date: February 10, 1995
- Running time: 62 minutes
- Country: Japan
- Language: Japanese

Blissful Genuine Sex: Penetration! (悶絶本番 ぶちこむ, Monzetsu honban: buchikomu) is a 1995 Japanese pink film directed by Toshiki Satō. It was chosen as Best Film of the year at the Pink Grand Prix ceremony. Hotaru Hazuki was given the Best Actress award and cinematographer Yasumasa Konishi won a Technical Award for their work on the film. Satō's original title for the film was Like a Rolling Stone (ライク・ア・ローリング・ストーン).

== Synopsis ==
A man travels to a countryside town seeking employment. He becomes romantically involved with a woman who cannot smile, and works for her parents' printing company. When he learns that his girlfriend in Tokyo has disappeared he returns to look for her. Screenwriter Kenji Fukuma based the script on his poetry.

== Cast ==
- Hotaru Hazuki (葉月螢)
- Kikujirō Honda (本多菊雄)
- Takeshi Itō (伊藤猛)
- Yōji Tanaka (田中要次)
- Yumi Yoshiyuki (吉行由実)
- Takahiro Hosoya (細谷隆広)
- Koichi Imaizumi (今泉浩一)
- Rumine Minamiguchi (南口るみね)
- Kazuhiro Ueda (上田和弘)
- Takao Iida (飯田孝男)

== Bibliography ==
=== English ===
- Monzetsu honban: buchikomu! (1995) at IMDb
- "MONZETSU HONBAN: BUCHIKOMU!". Complete Index to World Film.
- Weisser, Thomas; Yuko Mihara Weisser (1998). Japanese Cinema Encyclopedia: The Sex Films. Miami: Vital Books : Asian Cult Cinema Publications. p. 485. ISBN 1-889288-52-7.

=== Japanese ===
- 悶絶本番 ぶちこむ！！ (in Japanese). Japanese Movie Database.

Preceded by Keep on Masturbating: Non-Stop Pleasure	Pink Grand Prix for Best Film; 1995	Succeeded by Adultery Diary: One More Time While I'm Still Wet
