= Hisayasu Satō =

Japanese exploitation film director (born 1959)

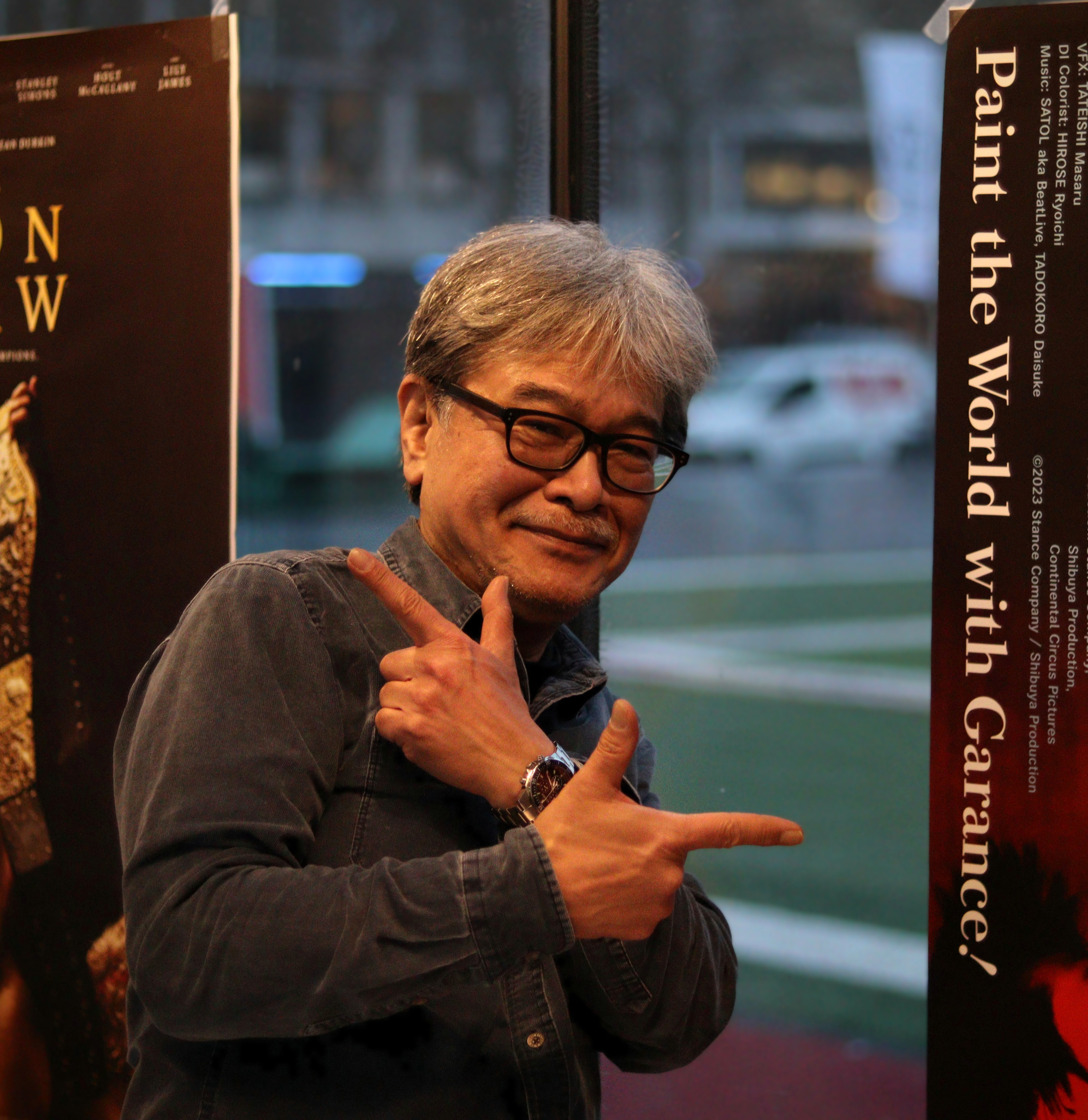
- Born: 15 August 1959 (age 67); Shizuoka City, Japan
- Occupations: Film director Screenwriter
- Years active: 1985–present

Hisayasu Satō (佐藤 寿保, Satō Hisayasu; born 15 August 1959 in Shizuoka City, Japan) is a Japanese exploitation film director. He has worked prolifically in the genre of pinku eiga films, which refers to Japanese films that prominently feature nudity or sexual content. His best-known works are the 1992 pink film The Bedroom and the 1996 V-Cinema splatter film Splatter: Naked Blood. He is known for his "sledgehammer" filmmaking style, and using his exploitation career to tackle serious subjects like obsession, alienation, perversion and voyeurism.

He has been likened to Canadian director David Cronenberg due to his penchant for body horror as well as dark eroticism. Along with fellow directors Kazuhiro Sano, Toshiki Satō and Takahisa Zeze, he is known as one of the "Four Heavenly Kings of Pink" (ピンク四天王, pinku shitenno).

== Life and career ==
Satō is a very prolific director, having directed about two dozen films in 1988 and 1989. To date, he has directed more than fifty films dealing with eroticism, sadism, and horror among the lower classes of Japan. He is famous for his "guerilla shooting technique" in which his actors appear on location in public and incorporate unknowing bystanders into the film. One notorious example of this technique can be seen in Widow's Perverted Hell (1991) (aka Look Into Me) in which the lead actress, nude and bound in S&M gear, appears in a busy downtown location and begs confused passers-by to help her masturbate. Allmovie comments, "Like Divine's memorable strut through the streets of Baltimore in Pink Flamingos, this scene was shot guerrilla-style, with no planning, and some of the reactions from unsuspecting pedestrians are priceless. Intended as a dark meditation on the unhinging effects of grief, the mondo aspects of its climactic scene makes the rather lackluster Mibojin Hentai Jigoku worth seeing."

Satō's 1987 film Temptation of the Mask was important for several reasons. One of the first gay films produced by a major pink film director, the film also brought together three members of the shitenno for the first time. Takahisa Zeze worked as Satō's assistant director for the film, and through him began hiring future-director Kazuhiro Sano as an actor in his films. Zeze later recalled, "I remember once there was a gay pink film, and Satō wanted to use Sano, so I was the go-between and negotiated with him to appear in it. That's how we all started working together."

Satō's second gay-themed film was Muscle (1988) (also known as Mad Ballroom Gala), a tribute to Italian director Pier Paolo Pasolini. For this film, Satō was awarded the grand prize at the Berlin Gay and Lesbian Festival in 1993. From this and later films like Hunters' Sense of Touch (1995), Satō has gained a reputation as one of the few directors who can competently alternate between gay and heterosexual-themed pink films.

Satō's 1990 film, Horse and Woman and Dog (also known as Poaching by the Water), another film featuring Kazuhiro Sano, became a success due to its scandalous scenes involving bestiality between the three characters in the film's title. Another controversial but highly regarded film from Satō is The Bedroom (1992), for which the director hired the Paris cannibal, Issei Sagawa (aka Kazumasa Sagawa) to appear in a cameo role.

Famed for the offensiveness of his films, Lolita: Vibrator Torture (1987) (also known as Secret Garden), dealing with a homeless man who rapes and murders women, is often singled out as Satō's most repulsive film. In his later works, Satō has collaborated with the female pink film writer, Kyoko Godai. While the violence in his films has sometimes been less extreme since this collaboration, the Weissers, in their Japanese Cinema Encyclopedia: The Sex Films call Godai and Satō's work on Uniform Punishment: Square Peg in Round Hole! (1991) (also known as Just an Illusion) "Perhaps the most mean-spirited satire on film.". The film deals with a religious cult who worships a maniacal young woman who spends her nights hunting the city for people to rape and kill with the help of a male slave. Allmovie judges the film a "perversely entertaining jet-black satire" and a "dark but highly watchable softcore effort".

Yoshiyuki Hayashida, editor of P*G magazine—currently the leading journal on pink film—and founder of the Pink Grand Prix, became a fan of Satō's work and wrote a script using many of Satō's major themes. Satō filmed the script as Uniform Masturbation: Virgin's Underpanties (1992) (also known as Close Dancing). Though Satō's style seems to have softened somewhat as the 1990s progressed, he was still capable of producing such works as Splatter: Naked Blood (1996), which, Allmovie warns, "contains one of the most appalling scenes in Japanese horror, with a young woman mutilating and eating her own body."

== Partial filmography ==
Release title	Satō's title	Release date	Studio
Mad Love! Lolita Poaching 激愛！ロリータ密猟; Gekiai! Lolita Mitsuro	Distorted Sense of Touch	February 1985	Shishi; Toei Central
Sex Virgin Unit: Party of Beasts; SEX乙女隊 獣たちの宴; Sex Otome-tai: Kemonotachi no Utage	Zero Flight	June 1985	Shishi; Toei Central
Wife Collector 人妻コレクター; Hitozume Collector	Decaying Town	1985-09-28	Nikkatsu; Shishi
Office Lady Rape: Disgrace! OL暴行汚す; OL Boko: Yogosu!	Save the Last Dance for Me	July 1986	Shintōhō Eiga/Kokuei
Uniform Virgin: The Prey 制服処女 ザ・えじき; Seifuku Shojo: The Ejiki	Explosion...	1986-08-09	Nikkatsu; Shishi
Exciting Eros: Hot Skin エキサイティング・エロ 熱い肌; Exciting Ero: Atsui Hada	Gimme Shelter	October 1986	Shishi; Million Film
Rape Climax! 暴行クライマックス; Boko Climax	Water's High	April 1987	Shishi; Shintōhō Eiga
Lolita: Vibrator Torture ロリータ・バイブ責め; Lolita Vibe-Zeme	Secret Garden	1987-09-19	Shishi; Nikkatsu
Genuine Rape 暴行本番; Boko Honban	Pleasure Kill	October 1987	Shishi; Shintōhō Eiga
Temptation of the Mask 仮面の誘惑; Kamen no Yuwaku	Temptation of the Mask	December 1987	Shishi; ENK Production
Hard Focus: Eavesdrop ハードフォーカス 盗聴＜ぬすみぎき＞ Hard Focus: Nusumi-giki	Survey Map of a Paradise Lost	1988-03-09	Kokuei; Shintōhō Eiga
Abnormal: Ugly Abuse アブノーマル 陰虐; Abnormal: Ingyaku	Rewind	July 1988	Kokuei; Shintōhō Eiga
Pervert Ward: Torturing the White Uniform 変態病棟 白衣責め; Hentai Byoto: Hakui-zeme	Love Letter in the Sand	1988-10-15	Kokuei; Shintōhō Eiga
Lolita Disgrace ロリータ恥辱; Lolita Chijoku	Radical Hysteria Tour	1988-12-23	Shishi; Shintōhō Eiga
Mad Ballroom Gala 狂った舞踏会; Kurutta Butokai	Asti: Lunar Eclipse Theater	March 1989	Shishi; ENK
Rape Between Sisters: Penetration! 姉妹連続レイプ えぐる！ Shimai Renzoku Rape: Eguru!	Welcome to the Illusion	1989-03-04	Shishi; Excess
Ecstasy Game 陶酔遊戯; Tosui Yugi	Bondage Ecstasy	May 1989	ENK Productions
Pervert Ward: S&M Clinic 変態病棟 SM診療室; Hentai Byoto: SM Shinryo-shitsu	Fuga Music for Alpha and Beta	1989-09-02	Kokuei; Shintōhō Eiga
Beauty Reporter: Rape Broadcast 美人レポーター 暴行生中継; Bijin Reporter: Boko Nama-chukei	Love Obsession	1989-10-07	Shishi; Shintōhō Eiga
Naked Action: College Girl Rape Edition 半裸本番 女子大生暴行篇; Hanra Honban: Joshidaisei Boko-hen	Psychic Rose	January 1990	Media Top/Shintōhō Eiga
Serial Rape: Perverted Experiment 連続レイプ 変態実験; Renzoku Rape: Hentai Jikken	Ki*Ra*Ra	February 1990	Shishi; Excess
Rapist with Handcuffs: Defile! 手錠暴行魔 いたぶる！ Tejo Boko-ma: Itaburu!	Interlocking Locks	May 1990	Shishi; Excess
Horse and Woman and Dog 馬と女と犬; Uma to Onna to Inu	Poaching by the Water	May 1990	Media Top/Shintōhō Eiga
Office Lady Rape: Devouring the Giant Tits; OL連続レイプ 巨乳むさぼる; OL Renzoku Rape: Kyonyu Musaboru	Slush	September 1990	Shishi; Excess
Special Lesson: Perverted Sex Education スペシャルレッスン 変態性教育; Special Lesson: Hentai Sei-kyoiku	The Gods Have a Nervous Breakdown	September 1990	Kokuei; Shintōhō Eiga
Hidden Video Maniac: Uniform Hunting 制服盗聴魔 激射・なぶる！ Seifuku Nusumi-dori-ma: Gekisha Naburu	Naked City	December 1990	Shishi; Excess
Lesbian Rape: Sweet Honey Juice レズビアンレイプ 甘い蜜汁; Lesbian Rape: Amai Mitsujiru	Silencer Made of Glass	1991-02-02	Shishi; Shintōhō Eiga
Uniform Punishment: Square Peg in Round Hole! 制服私刑 ねじり込め！ Seifuku Lynch: Nejirikome!	Just an Illusion	1991-03-01	Shishi; Excess
Widow's Perverted Hell 未亡人変態地獄; Mibojin Hentai Jigoku	Look Into Me	1991-04-26	Shishi; Excess
Hidden Video Report: Dark Shot! 盗撮レポート 陰写！ Nusumidori Report: Insha!	Turtle Vision	1991-07-20	Shintōhō Eiga
New Wife's Private Parts: Caress 新妻下半身 わしづかみ; Nizuma Kahanshin: Washizukami	Doll	1991-11-22	Shishi; Excess
Lady of the Stable 馬小舎の令嬢; Umagoya no Reijo	Wave	1991-12-21	Shintōhō Eiga
Real Action: Vibrator Punishment 本番バイブ 折檻; Honban: Vibe Sekken	Symbol of Release	1992-01-24	Shishi; Excess
Housewife Punishment: Triple Torture 人間拷問 三段責め; Hitozuma Gomon: Sandan-zeme	Labyrinth of Primary Colors	1992-07-31	Shishi; Excess
Promiscuous Wife: Disgraceful Torture 浮気妻 恥辱責め; Uwaki-zuma: Chijoku-zeme	An Aria on Gazes	1992-09-12	Kokuei; Shintōhō Eiga
Uniform Masturbation: Virgin's Underpanties 制服ONANIE 処女の下着; Seifuku Onanie: Shojo no Shitagi	Close Dancing	1992-10-10	Shintōhō Eiga
S&M Group Wax Torture; SM集団?責め; SM Shudan Ro-zeme	Dirty Blue	1992-11-06	Shishi; Excess
Wife in Mourning: Pubic-Shaved Rope Slave 喪服妻 剃毛縄奴隷; Mofuku-zuma: Teimō Nawa-dorei	Negation	1993-02-05	Shishi; Excess
Real Time Tapping Report: Pillow Talk (生)盗聴リポート 痴話; Nama Tocho Report: Chiwa	Kyrie Eleison	1993-03-05	Shintōhō Eiga
Pleasure Masturbation: New Wife Version 快感ONANIE 新妻篇; Kaikan Onanie: Niizuma-hen	Light Sleep	1993-05-28	Shishi; Excess
Real Action: Drink Up ナマ本番 飲み干す！ Nama Honban: Nomihosu!	Angel in the Dark	1993-08-13	Shishi; Excess
Molester's Train: Nasty Behavior 痴漢電車 いやらしい行為; Chikan Densha: Iyarashii Kōi	Birthday	1993-11-26	Kokuei; Shintōhō Eiga
Wife's Perverted Beauty Salon 人妻変態美容師; Hitozuma Hentai Biyoshitsu	Dead End	1994-01-14	Shishi; Excess
Molester and the Peeper: Gynecology Ward 痴漢と覗き 婦人科病練; Chikan to Nozoki: Fujin-ka Byoto	Sick People	1994-04-01	Shishi; Excess
Young Wife: Opening Juicy Thighs 若奥様 太股びらき; Wakaoku-sama: Futomono-biraki	Rental Love	1994-06-17	Shishi; Excess
Filthy Wife: Wet いやらしい人妻 濡れる; Iyarashii Hitozuma: Nureru	Love - Zero = Infinity	1994	Kokuei; Shintōhō Eiga
Wife in Heat: While Husband is Away すけべ妻 夫の留守に; Sukebe-zuma: Otto no Rusu ni	Rafureshia	1995-01-06	Kokuei; Shintōhō Eiga
Hunters' Sense of Touch 狩人たちの触覚; Karyudo-tachi no Shokkaku	Hunters' Sense of Touch	1995-05-02	ENK Productions
In a Grove 薮の中; Yabu no Naka		1996-05-18	Image Factory
Splatter: Naked Blood 女虐/NAKED BLOOD; Megyaku: Naked Blood		1996-02-20	TM Project/Museum
Night of the Anatomical Doll 人体模型の夜; Jintai-mokei no Yoru		1996-11-08	Excellent Film/Toei Video
Meet Me in the Dream: Wonderland 夢で逢いましょう; Yume de Aimasho: Wonderland		1996-02-09	Pink Pineapple
Soft Skin やわらかい肌; Yawarakai Hada		1998-01-31	Kokuei; Shintōhō Eiga
The Fetist: Hot Breath THE FETIST 熱い吐息 The Fetist: Atsui toiki		1998-05-02	ENK Production
Scent of a Married Woman 人妻の値段 匂いたつ欲情; Hitozuma no Nedan: Nioutatsu Yokujou		2001-28-12	Legend Pictures
Rampo Noir (segment: "The Caterpillar") 乱歩地獄; Ranpo Jigoku		2005-05-11	Albatros Film; Toei
The Tattooer 刺青; Si-Sei		2006-24-03	ArtPort Inc.
Love & Loathing & Lulu & Ayano 名前のない女たち; Namae no nai Onnatachi		2010-04-09	There's Enterprise Inc. Makotoya
Hana-Dama: The Origin 華魂; Hana-Dama		2014-18-01	Shibuya Production
Hana-Dama: Phantom 華魂 幻影; Hana-Dama: Gen'ei		2016-30-04	Shibuya Production
The Eye's Dream 眼球の夢; Gankyu no yume		2016-01-07	Arrete Ton Cinema; Stance Company
Cute Devil 可愛い悪魔; Kawaii akuma		2018-23-06	Is Field

== Notes ==
=== Bibliography ===
- Hunter, Jack. "Abnormal Ward: The Forbidden Visions of Hisayasu Sato" in Andy Black (ed), Necronomicon: The Journal of Horror and Erotic Cinema: Book Two, London: Creation Books, 1999, pp. 30–39.
- Koyama, Akirashi (24 February 2003). "Hisayasu Satō Interview" (in Japanese). channel.slowtrain.org. Archived from the original on 6 November 2003.
- Seveon, Julien. Le cinema enrage au Japon. France : 1st edition : Sulliver 2006 / 2nd edition : Rouge Profond 2009. ISBN 978-2-911199-85-1 (in French)
- Seveon, Julien. USA : "Interview with Hisayasu Sato" in Asian Cult Cinema #34, 1st quarter 2002.
- Weisser, Thomas; Yuko Mihara Weisser (1998). "Spotlight: Four Kings of Pink (Hisayasu Sato)". Japanese Cinema Encyclopedia: The Sex Films. Miami: Vital Books : Asian Cult Cinema Publications. pp. 463–479. ISBN 1-889288-52-7.
