= 1995 in anime =

The events of 1995 in anime.

== Accolades ==
At the Mainichi Film Awards, Junkers Come Here won the Animation Film Award and Memories won the Ōfuji Noburō Award. Internationally, Pom Poko won the award for best feature film at the Annecy International Animated Film Festival.

== Releases ==
English name	Japanese name	Type	Demographic	Regions
Armitage III	アミテージ・ザ・サード (Amitēji Za Sādo)	OVA		
The Biography of Confucius	孔子傳 (Koushi-den)	TV movie		JA
Catnapped!	とつぜん！猫の国 バニパルウィット (Totsuzen! Neko no Kuni Baniparu Uitto)	Movie		
Compiler Festa	COMPILER FESTA	OVA	Seinen	
Cool Devices	クールディバイシス (Kūru Dibaishisu)	OVA		
Crayon Shin-chan: Unkokusai's Ambition	クレヨンしんちゃん 雲黒斎の野望 (Kureyon Shinchan: Unkokusai no Yabō)	Movie		
The Diary of Anne Frank	アンネの日記 (Anne no Nikki)	Movie		
Doraemon: Nobita's Diary on the Creation of the World	ドラえもん のび太の創世日記 (Doraemon: Nobita no Sousei Nikki)	Movie		JA
Dragon Ball Z: Fusion Reborn	ドラゴンボールZ 復活のフュージョン!!悟空とベジータ (Doragon Bōru Zetto Fukkatsu no Fusion!! Gokū to Bejīta)	Movie		
Dragon Ball Z: Wrath of the Dragon	ドラゴンボールZ 龍拳爆発!!悟空がやらねば誰がやる？ (Doragon Bōru Zetto Ryū-Ken Bakuhatsu!! Gokū ga Yaraneba Dare ga Yaru?)	Movie		
Dragon Knight: Another Knight on the Town	ドラゴンナイト外伝 (Doragon Naito Gaiden)	OVA		JA
Dragon Rider	ドラゴンライダー (Doragon Raidā)	OVA		JA
Elementalors	精霊使い (Seirei Tsukai)	OVA		
Elf Princess Rane	妖精姫レーン (Yōsei Hime Rēn)	OVA		
El-Hazard	神秘の世界エルハザード (Shinpi no Sekai Eru Hazādo)	OVA		
Fushigi Yugi: The Mysterious Play	ふしぎ遊戯 (Fushigi Yūgi)	TV		
Galaxy Fräulein Yuna	銀河お嬢様伝説ユナ (Ginga Ojōsama Densetsu Yuna)	OVA		
Ghost in the Shell	Ghost in the Shell/攻殻機動隊 (Gōsuto in za Sheru/Kōkaku Kidōtai)	Movie		
Golden Boy	Golden Boy	OVA	Seinen	
Mobile Suit Gundam Wing	新機動戦記ガンダムウイング (Shin Kidō Senki Gandamu Wingu)	TV		
Gunsmith Cats	GUN SMITH CATS	TV	Seinen	
Iczer Girl Iczelion	戦ー少女 イクセリオン (Ikusā Gāru Ikuzerion)	OVA		JA
Idol Project	アイドルプロジェクト (Aidoru Purojekuto)	OVA		JA
Junkers Come Here	ユンカース・カム・ヒア (Yunkāsu Kamu Hia)	Movie		JA
Jurassic Tripper	恐竜冒険記ジュラトリッパー (Kyōryū Bōkenki Jura Torippā)	TV		
The Katta-kun Story	カッタ君物語 (Katta-kun Monogatari)	Movie	Family	JA
Kazu & Yasu: Birth of a Hero	KAZU&YASU ヒーロー誕生 (Kazu & Yasu Hero Tanjō)	Movie		JA
Legend of Crystania: The Motion Picture	はじまりの冒険者たち レジェンド・オブ・クリスタニア (Hajimari no Bōkenshatachi: Rejendo obu Kurisutania)	Movie		
The Legend of the Blue Wolves	銀河帝国の滅亡・外伝 蒼き狼たちの伝説 (Ginga Teikoku no Metsubō Gaiden: Aoki Ōkami-tachi no Densetsu)	OVA		JA
Lesson of Darkness	淫獣家庭教師	OVA		JA
Lesson XX	Lesson XX	OVA		JA
Let's Go! Anpanman: Let's Defeat the Haunted Ship!!	それいけ! アンパンマン ゆうれい船をやっつけろ!! (Soreike! Anpanman Yūreisen o Yattsukero!!)	Movie		JA
Lupin III: Farewell to Nostradamus	ルパン三世 くたばれ!ノストラダムス (Rupan Sansei: Kutabare! Nosutoradamusu)	Movie		
Lupin III: The Pursuit of Harimao's Treasure	ルパン三世 ハリマオの財宝を追え!! (Rupan Sansei: Harimao no Zaihō o oe!!)	TV special		
Macross Plus: Movie Edition	マクロスプラス MOVIE EDITION (Makurosu Purasu Mūbī Edition)	Movie		JA
Magical Girl Pretty Sammy	魔法少女プリティサミー (Mahō Shōjo Puriti Samī)	OVA		
Memories	MEMORIES	Movie		
Neon Genesis Evangelion	新世紀エヴァンゲリオン (Shinseiki Evangerion)	TV		
The Ping Pong Club	行け!稲中卓球部 (Ike! Inachū Takkyū-bu)	TV		
Romeo and the Black Brothers	ロミオの青い空 (Romeo no Aoi Sora)	TV		
Ruin Explorers	秘境探検ファム&イーリー (Hikyō Tanken Famu to Īrī)	OVA		
Run	5等になりたい。 (Gotō ni Naritai.)	Movie		JA
Saber Marionette R	セイバーマリオネットR (Seibā Marionetto R)	OVA		
Sailor Moon SuperS	美少女戦士セーラームーン SuperS (Bishōjo Senshi Sērā Mūn Sūpāzu)	TV		JA
Sailor Moon SuperS: The Movie	美少女戦士セーラームーンSuperS セーラー9戦士集結！ブラック・ドリーム・ホールの奇跡 (Bishōjo Senshi Sērā Mūn Sūpāzu: Sērā Kyū Senshi Shūketsu! Burakku Dorīmu Hōru no Kiseki)	Movie		JA
Saint Tail	怪盗セイント・テール (Kaitō Seinto Tēru)	TV		
The Silent Service	沈黙の艦隊 (Chinmoku no Kantai)	OVA		JA
Slam Dunk: Shohoku's Greatest Challenge! Burning Hanamichi Sakuragi	SLAM DUNK 湘北最大の危機! 燃えろ桜木花道 (SLAM DUNK Shohoku Saidai no Kiki! Moero Sakuragi Hanamichi)	Movie		JA
Slam Dunk: Howling Basketman Spirit!! Hanamichi and Rukawa's Hot Summer	SLAM DUNK 吠えろバスケットマン魂!! 花道と流川の熱き夏 (SLAM DUNK Hoero Basukettoman Tamashii!! Hanamichi to Rukawa no Atsuki Natsu)	Movie		JA
Slayers	スレイヤーズ (Sureiyāzu)	TV		
Slayers The Motion Picture	スレイヤーズ (Sureiyāzu)	Movie		
Soar High! Isami	飛べ！イサミ (Tobe! Isami)	TV		JA
Sorcerer Hunters	爆れつハンター (Bakuretsu Hantā)	TV		JA
Stainless Night	ステンレス・ナイト	OVA		JA
Tenchi Universe	天地無用! (Tenchi Muyō!)	TV		JA
Tokyo Revelation	真・女神転生 東京黙示録 (Shin Megami Tensei: Tokyo Mokushiroku)	OVA		JA
Twelve Warrior Explosive Eto Rangers	十二戦支 爆烈エトレンジャー (Jūni Senshi Bakuretsu Etorenjā)	TV		JA
Whisper of the Heart	耳をすませば (Mimi o Sumaseba)	Movie		
Wild Knights Gulkeeva	獣戦士ガルキーバ (Juu Senshi Garukība)	TV		JA
World Fairy Tale Series	世界名作童話シリーズ・ワ～ォ！メルヘン王国 (Sekai meisaku dōwa shirīzu - Wa-o! Meruhen ōkoku)	TV		JA
Zenki	鬼神童子ZENKI (Kishin Dōji Zenki)	TV		JA
Zukkoke Trio: Guruguru-sama of Kusunoki Mansion	ズッコケ三人組 楠屋敷のグルグル様 (Zukkoke Sanningumi: Kusunoki Yashiki no Guruguru-sama)	TV special		JA

== Deaths ==
=== March ===
- March 19: Yasuo Yamada, Japanese voice actor (voice of Lupin III in the Lupin the Third franchise), dies at age 62.

== See also ==
- 1995 in animation
