= Toshiya Ueno =

Japanese film director (1963–2013)

- Born: 2 October 1963; Japan
- Died: 15 April 2013 (aged 49)
- Occupations: Film director, Screenwriter, Actor, Producer
- Years active: 1991–present

Toshiya Ueno (上野俊哉, Ueno Toshiya) (2 October 1963 – 15 April 2013) was a Japanese film director, actor, screenwriter, and producer. He is one of the pink film directors known collectively as the "Seven Lucky Gods of Pink" (ピンク七福神, pinku shichifukujin), a group which comprises Ueno, Mitsuru Meike, Yūji Tajiri, Shinji Imaoka, Yoshitaka Kamata, Toshirō Enomoto and Rei Sakamoto.

== Life and career ==
Ueno began his film career as an assistant director on "pinku shitenno" (ピンク四天王) director Toshiki Satō's debut film Beast (獣 けだもの, Kedamono) aka Dream Woman (1989). Ueno's directing debut came the following year with Latest Soap Technique (最新ソープテクニック, Saishin soopu tekunikku) (1990). Ueno acted as an "advance guard" for the pinku shichifukujin group of directors when his Keep on Masturbating: Non-Stop Pleasure (1994) became the first film to win the "Best Film" award at the Pink Grand Prix. Ueno was also awarded Best Director at the ceremony. Ueno's 2003 film Ambiguous also won the Best Film prize at the Pink Grand Prix. Ueno was given a six-film career retrospective at Tokyo's Athénée Francais in September 2004.

Awards and achievements
Pink Grand Prix
Preceded by Toshiki Satō	Pink Grand Prix for Best Director; Toshiya Ueno; 1994 for Keep on Masturbating: Non-Stop Pleasure	Succeeded by Takahisa Zeze for Endless Sex
