= Kokkuri-san: Shin Toshi Densetsu =

- Starring: Mariya Suzuki; Momoko Kaechi; Mao Kanjo
- Release date: February 8, 2014 (Japan)
- Running time: 70 minutes
- Country: Japan
- Language: Japanese

Kokkuri-san: Shin Toshi Densetsu (こっくりさん ‐新都市伝説‐, Kokkuri: New Urban Legend) is a 2014 Japanese horror film directed by Masaaki Jindo and starring Mariya Suzuki.

== Plot ==
A girl named Mari and her friend Saki decide to do fortune telling games

== Cast ==
- Mariya Suzuki
- Momoko Kaechi
- Mao Kanjo

== See also ==
- Kokkuri-san: Gekijoban
