= Toshiki Satō =

Japanese film director and screenwriter (born 1961)

- Born: May 6, 1961 (age 65); Fukushima Prefecture, Japan
- Occupations: Film director and screenwriter
- Years active: 1989 – present
- Spouse: Ayaka Konno (married 2022)

Toshiki Satō (サトウトシキ, Satō Toshiki; born May 6, 1961) a.k.a. 佐藤としき, 佐藤俊喜, and 本藤新 is a Japanese film director and screenwriter best known for his pink films of the 1990s. Along with fellow directors, Takahisa Zeze, Kazuhiro Sano and Hisayasu Satō, he is known as one of the "Four Heavenly Kings of Pink" (ピンク四天王, pinku shitenno).

== Life and career ==
Toshiki Satō was born in 1961 and graduated from Nikkatsu Arts School. After graduation, Satō was scheduled to make his directorial debut in 1986 with the pink film studio, Million Film, but this project was canceled when the studio ceased production that year. Satō worked as an AV (Adult Video) director for a few years, and made two films for Nikkatsu's post-Roman Porno subsidiary, Nikkatsu Video, in 1988. His debut film was the unsuccessful 1989 pink film drama, The Beast. AV idol Maya Asabuki starred in this film judged "light on drama, but heavy on sex scenes".

Though he often collaborates, Satō usually writes or co-write his own scripts. His films deal with the difficulties of relationships in modern society, and his typical subject matter includes "pornographers, panty-sniffers, lesbians, and lusty murderers". His films often end with the protagonist committing suicide in spectacular style. The director's stylistic concerns began to show themselves in his second film, E-Cup Action Take Two: Rich and Ripe (1989). Allmovie calls Latest Bathhouse Sex Technique: Palace of the Soapsud Princess (1990) an oddly moving film, and one of Satō's most erotic.

Soaking Wet: Touching All Over the Body (1990), had an upbeat tone, somewhat atypical for Satō. Actor Tōru Nakane was lauded by the mainstream critics for his performance in the film. That's Hentatainment! Perverted Sex Document (1991) is an exploration of gender which could be interpreted as either a gay or a straight film, depending upon one's personal definitions of gender. Satō followed this tale of transsexualism with Abnormal Ecstasy, another, more psychological treatment of the same subject the same year.

In 1995 Satō made the two-part mainstream Fighting Dragon Story, but continued in the pink film genre after that. Atashi wa juice (1996), the second in a series of theatrical releases by Fujii TV, was a popular and profitable lesbian erotic film.

== Partial filmography ==
Release title	Satō's title	Release date	Studio
Beast 獣 けだもの; Kedamono	Woman of Dreams	1989-03-04	Burst Brain/Shintōhō Eiga
E-Cup Real Action Take Two: Rich & Ripe; Eカップ本番 II 豊熱; E-Cup Honban II: Hojuku	Landscape with a Key	1989-04-29	Burst Brain/Shintōhō Eiga
Mizue Tashiro's The Genuine Orgasm 田代水絵 ザ・本番アクメ おいしい水の作り方; Tashiro Mizue The Honban Acme	How to Make Good Tasting Water	1989-08-12	Burst Brain/Shintōhō Eiga
Soaking Wet: Touching All Over the Body ぐしょ濡れ全身愛撫 BODY TOUCH; Gushonorue: Zenshin Aibu	Forbidden Zone	February 1990	Burst Brain/Shintōhō Eiga
Latest Bathhouse Sex Technique: Palace of the Soapsud Princess 最新ソープテクニック2 泡姫御殿; Saishin Soap Technique: Awahime Goten	Yoshiwara District	August 1990	Media Top/Shintōhō Eiga
Extremely Wild Genuine Sex: Night of the Perverts 過激本番ショー 異常者たちの夜; Kageki Honban Sho: Ijosha-tachi no Yoru	Night of the Perverts	December 1990	Outcast Produce/Shintōhō Eiga
That's Hentatainment! Perverted Sex Document ザッツ変態テインメント 異常SEX大全集; That's Hentatainment! Ijo Sex Daizenshi	Hobby	1991-04-27	Outcast Produce/Shintōhō Eiga
Abnormal Ecstasy アブノーマル・エクスタシー	Late Blooming	1991-11-02	Outcast Produce/Shintōhō Eiga
Special Live Show: Sex Video 特別（生）企画 ザ・投稿ビデオ; Tokubetsu Nama Kikaku: Toko Video	The Home Sex Video	1992-06-06	Outcast Produce/Shintōhō Eiga
Promiscuous Wife's Sexuality: Pleasure Hunting 不倫妻の性 快楽あさり; Furin-zuma no Sei: Kairaku-asari	Simple Story	1992-08-29	Outcast Produce/Shintōhō Eiga
Molester's Commuter Train: Office Lady's Sexuality 痴漢通勤電車 OLたちの性; Chikan Tsukin Densha: OL-tachi no Sei	Sex * Conversation * Commuter Train	1993-04-02	Outcast Produce/Shintōhō Eiga
Petting Lesbians: Sensitive Zone ペッティング・レズ 性感帯; Petting Lez: Seikan-tai	Naomi	1993-10-01	Kokuei/Shintōhō Eiga
Molester's Train Housewife: Madam is a Pervert 痴漢電車人妻篇 奥様は痴女; Chikan Densha Hitozuma-hen: Okusama wa Chijo	In Tandem	1994-04-01	Outcast/Shintōhō Eiga
Lots of Peeping: Hot Underpanties of a Lover 覗きがいっぱい 愛人の生下着; Nozoki ga Ippai: Aijin no Nama-shitagi	"Tomorrow Joe" is Alive	1994-07-01	Kokuei/Shintōhō Eiga
Blissful Genuine Sex: Penetration! 悶絶本番 ぶちこむ！！ Monzetsu Honban: Buchikomu!	Like a Rolling Stone	1995-02-10	Kokuei/Shintōhō Eiga
Fighting Dragon Story 闘龍伝; Toryu-den		1995-02-10	SHS Project
Fighting Dragon Story 2 闘龍伝2; Toryu-den 2		June 1995	SHS Project
Lunatic		1996-06-01	Excellent Film
Kawarasaki Family 河原崎家の一族; Kawarasaki-ke no Ichizoku		1996-06-07	Pink Pineapple
Adultery Diary: One More Time While I'm Still Wet 不倫日記 濡れたままもう一度; Furin nikki: nureta mama mō ichidō		1996-07-05	Kokuei /Shintōhō Eiga
I Am Juice アタシはジュース; Atashi wa juice		1996-07-13	Fujii/Tohokushinsha Film
Apartment Wife: Moans from Next Door 団地妻 隣りのあえぎ; Danchi-zuma: tonari no aegi		2000-06-01	Kokuei /Shintōhō Eiga
Perfect Blue: Yume Nara Samete		2002-08-24	
Cuffs / Lost Virgin ロスト・ヴァージン やみつき援助交際; Tejyo		2002-09-27	Kokuei/Shintōhō Eiga

Awards and achievements
Pink Grand Prix
Preceded by Kazuhiro Sano	Pink Grand Prix for Best Director; Toshiki Satō; 1993	Succeeded by Toshiya Ueno
