= Takahisa Zeze =

Japanese film director and screenwriter (born 1960)

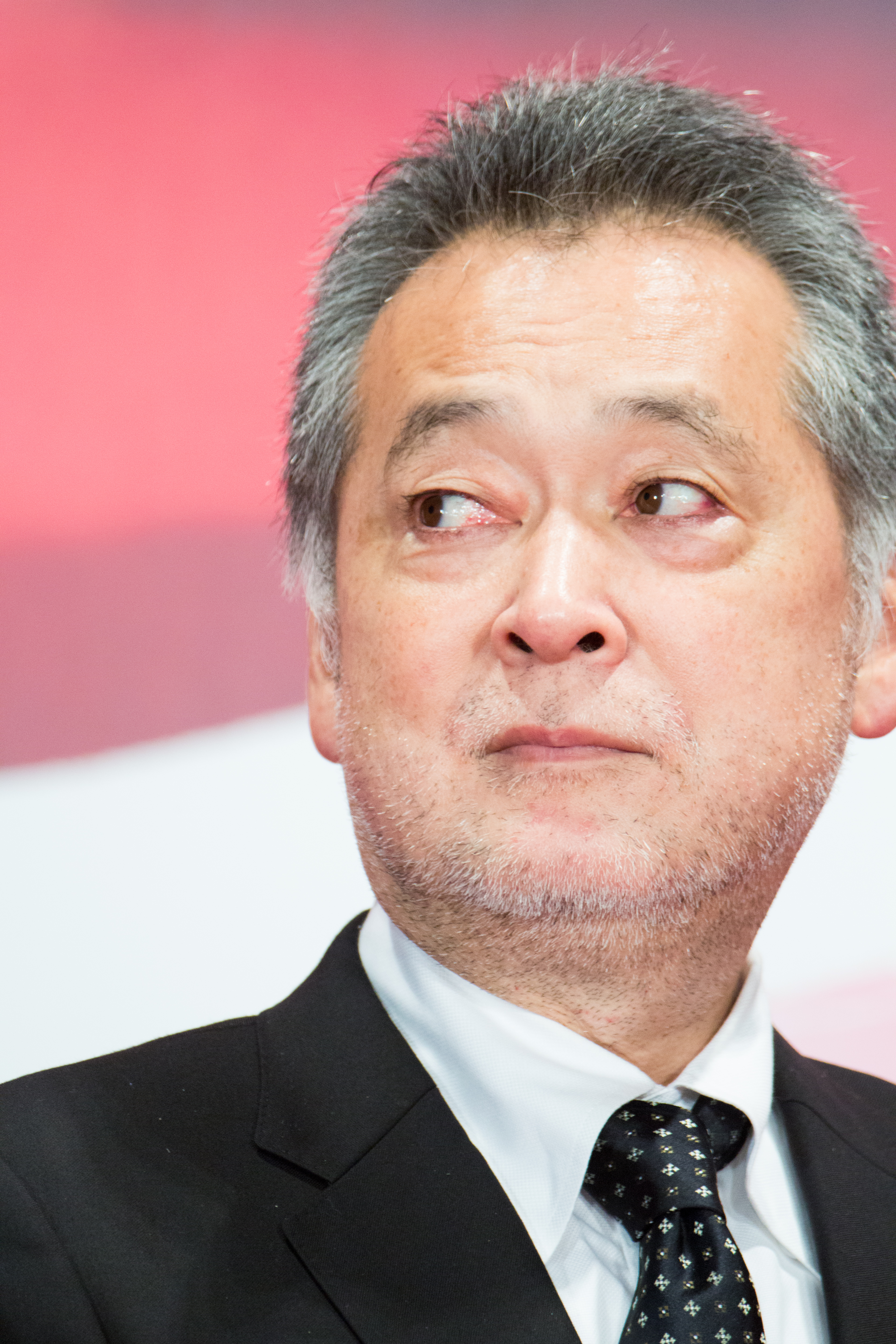
- Born: 24 May 1960 (age 66); Tochigi, Japan
- Occupations: Film director Screenwriter
- Years active: 1989–present
- Movement: Pinku eiga

Takahisa Zeze (瀬々敬久, Zeze Takahisa; born 24 May 1960) is a Japanese film director and screenwriter first known for his soft-core pornographic pink films of the 1990s. Along with fellow directors, Kazuhiro Sano, Toshiki Satō, and Hisayasu Sato, he is known as one of the "Four Heavenly Kings of Pink" (ピンク四天王, pinku shitennō). In recent years, he has directed such major commercial hits as 64: Part I, 64: Part II, and The 8-Year Engagement, while continuing to make independent art films like Heaven's Story and The Chrysanthemum and the Guillotine.

== Life and career ==
"I try to show relationships, I make films about love. It's not just about the act of having sex, but what leads up to it and what comes after. What are the feelings of the people before, while they do it and after they did it? It's this development that interests me. I don't care very much about rape, because it's very one-sided and doesn't allow for this kind of development... I don't want to depict characters as having sex, but as making love."
-- Takahisa Zeze

Takahisa Zeze was born in 1960 and graduated from Kyoto University in 1986. While attending this prestigious university, Zeze began making experimental films. He began his career in the film industry working for Shishi Productions as a screenwriter and assistant director for various pink film directors, including Hisayasu Satō.

Zeze usually writes the scripts for his films, which often contain examinations of social concerns not usually found in the pink film genre. His style is much less violent than Sato's, and rarely includes rape, one of the traditional thematic staples of the pink film from earliest times. Zeze also engages in more satire and self-conscious humor than is typical in the genre. He has the habit of giving his films eccentric titles during their production which the studios replace with a more commercially exploitable name before release. For example, Zeze's title My Existence Is a Phenomenon Based on the Hypothesis of Blue Light Generated by Organic Currency was changed to Amazon Garden: Uniform Lesbians. He sometimes uses whimsical pseudonyms in his directorial credit, such as "Jean-Luc Zeze" or "South Pole #1". After a decade of making pink films, Zeze turned to mainstream releases in 1997 with Kokkuri. While continuing to work in the pink film genre, he has since directed several mainstream successes such as Rush!, Hysteric and Dog Star. In 2002 Zeze was honored with a career retrospective at Italy's Far East Film Festival.

He often works with the cinematographer Kōichi Saitō.

== Partial filmography ==
| Release title | Zeze's title | Release date | Studio |
|---|---|---|---|
| Extracurricular Activity: Rape! 課外授業 暴行; Kagai Jugyo: Boko | Go to Haneda and You Will See Kids Dressed like Pirates Ready to Attack | 1989-06-24 | Kokuei/Shintōhō Eiga |
| Beast Lust: Devil Rampage 獣欲魔 乱行; Juyoku-ma Ranko | Blue Sky | 1989-12-02 | Kokuei/Shintōhō Eiga |
| Indecent Tongue Technique 破廉恥舌戯テクニック; Harenchi Zetsugi Technique | Moon Over the Desert | June 1990 | Kokuei/Shintōhō Eiga |
| Molester's Train: Rie's Fundoshi Underwear 痴漢電車 りえのフンドシ; Chikan Densha: Rie no Fundoshi | Coconut Crush | June 1990 | Media Top/Shintōhō Eiga |
| Obscene Runaway Gang: Beast 猥褻暴走集団 獣 Waisetsu Boso Shudan: Kemono | Noman's Land | 1991-05-18 | Kokuei/Shintōhō Eiga |
| Amazon Garden: Uniform Lesbians 禁男の園 ザ・制服レズ; Kindan no Sono: The Seifuku Les | My Existence Is a Phenomenon Based on the Hypothesis of Blue Light Generated by Organic Currency | 1992-10-10 | Kokuei/Shintōhō Eiga |
| Molester's Train: Mischievous Wives 痴漢電車 いけない妻たち; Chikan Densha: Ikenai Tsuma-tachi | My Train Is Supposed to be Going North But It's Going South | 1992-11-28 | Kokuei/Shintōhō Eiga |
| Widow: Bliss on the Seventh Day of Mourning 未亡人 初七日の悶え; Mibojin: Shonanuka no Modae | The Monk Farted | 1993-03-19 | Kokuei/Shintōhō Eiga |
| Widow: Bliss in a Mourning Dress 未亡人 喪服の悶え; Mibojin: Mofuku no Modae | Modern Story About Bandits | 1993-11-19 | Kokuei/Shintōhō Eiga |
| High Class Bathhouse Sex Technique: Blissful Secret Acts 高級ソープテクニック4 悶絶秘戯; Kokyu Soap Technique: Monzetsu Higi; The Dream of Garuda | Dream of the Phoenix | 1994-04-22 | Kokuei/Shintōhō Eiga |
| Genuine Lesbian: Embarrassing Position 本番レズ 恥ずかしい体位; Honban Les: Hazukashii Taii | Fallen Angels in September | 1994-11-25 | Kokuei/Shintōhō Eiga |
| Lots of Dirty Stuff すけべてんこもり; Sukebe Tenkomori | End of the World | 1995-07-28 | Kokuei/Shintōhō Eiga |
| Endless Sex 終わらないセックス; Owaranai Sex | Night-Chirping Locust | 1995-09-15 | Kokuei/Shintōhō Eiga |
| Red Love Affair 赫い情事; Akai Joji | The Expected Scene | 1996-01-12 | Kokuei/Shintōhō Eiga |
| Kokkuri / Fox Spirit; KOKKURI・こっくりさん; Kokkuri-san | | 1997-05-24 | Nikkatsu |
| Woman with Black Underwear: Snake-Headed Fish 黒い下着の女 雷魚; Kuroi Shitagi no Onna: Raigyo | | 1997-05-31 | Kokuei/Shintōhō Eiga |
| Anarchy in Japansuke: The Woman Who Comes When Watched アナーキー・インじゃぱんすけ 見られてイク女; Anaakii in jyapansuke: mirarete iku onna | | 1999-04-23 | Kokuei/Shintōhō Eiga |
| Hysteric | I Don't Want to Let You Go Until Dawn | 2000-05-06 | Legend Pictures |
| Tokyo X Erotica トーキョー×エロティカ 痺れる快楽; Tokyo X Erotica: Shibireru Kairaku | | 2001-08-31 | Kokuei/Shintōhō Eiga |
| Rush! | | 2001-06-23 | ElkInfinity |
| Dog Star ドッグ・スター | | 2002-04-27 | Omega Micott Inc./Legend Pictures |
| SF Whipped Cream | | 2002-12-14 | Twins Japan |
| Moon Child | | 2003-04-19 | Shochiku/Mainichi Shimbun/WoWow |
| Yuda 「エロス番長」シリーズ ユダ "Eros Honban" Series: Yuda | | 2004-08-21 | EuroSpace |
| A Gap in the Skin 肌の隙間; Hada no Sukima | | 2004-12-07 | Kokuei/Shintōhō Eiga |
| Sanctuary | | 2006-10-07 | Legend Pictures |
| Shisei: Ochita Jorōgumo | | 2007-01-13 | NTT Resonant/Art Port |
| Heaven's Story | | 2010-10-02 | |
| Antoki no Inochi | | 2011-11 | Shochiku |
| Strayer's Chronicle | | 2015-06-27 | |
| 64: Part I | | 2016-05-07 | |
| 64: Part II | | 2016-06-11 | |
| Nariyuki na Tamashii | | 2017 | |
| The 8-Year Engagement | | 2017 | Shochiku |
| The Chrysanthemum and the Guillotine | | 2018 | |
| My Friend "A" | | 2018 | |
| The Promised Land | | 2019 | Kadokawa |
| Threads: Our Tapestry of Love | | 2020 | Toho |
| In the Wake | | 2021 | Shochiku |
| Tomorrow's Dinner Table | | 2021 | Kadokawa |
| Fragments of the Last Will | | 2022 | Toho |
| One Last Bloom | | 2023 | Gaga |
| The Boy and the Dog | | 2025 | Toho |
| Sukiyaki | | 2026 | Toho |
| Cry Out | | 2026 | Tokyo Theatres |
| All That Exists | | 2027 | Toei |

Awards and achievements
Pink Grand Prix
| Preceded by Toshiya Ueno for Keep on Masturbating: Non-Stop Pleasure | Pink Grand Prix for Best Director; Takahisa Zeze; 1995 for Endless Sex | Succeeded by Takahisa Zeze for Upcoming Scenery |
| Preceded by Takahisa Zeze for Endless Sex | Pink Grand Prix for Best Director; Takahisa Zeze; 1996 for Upcoming Scenery | Succeeded by Yumi Yoshiyuki for Sisters Donburi: No Pulling Out |
