= Kazuhiro Sano =

Japanese film director and actor (born 1956)

- Born: 1956 (age 69–70)
- Occupations: Film director, Screenwriter; Actor
- Years active: 1980 – present

Kazuhiro Sano (佐野和宏, Sano Kazuhiro; born in 1956) is a Japanese film director, screenwriter and actor best known for his pink films of the 1990s. Along with fellow directors, Takahisa Zeze, Toshiki Satō and Hisayasu Sato, he is known as one of the "Four Heavenly Kings of Pink" (ピンク四天王, pinku shitenno). Sano's films differ from those of other Pink film directors of the time in that, while not necessarily optimistic or upbeat, they are more concerned with relationships and romance than violence and sadism. He has the distinction of winning the Best Director prize three consecutive years at the Pink Grand Prix. He has also been given two Best Actor awards, two Best Actor second place awards, and a Best Screenplay award at this ceremony.

== Life and career ==
Kazuhiro Sano was born in 1956 and studied at Meiji University. It was while at university that he first became involved in film, acting in director Sogo Ishii's student film Crazy Thunder Road (1980). Toei Studios later released this film theatrically. Noticing Sano in the film, veteran pink film director Mamoru Watanabe gave him a role in his Dark Hair Velvet Soul (1982). Sano acted in films of Kazuo "Gaira" Komizu and Hisayasu Sato before he began directing. In 1989 Sano was awarded the Best Actor prize at the Pink Grand Prix, an award he won again in 1993. Sano's directorial debut was Capturing: Dirty Foreplay (1989), which, like most of his films, he also wrote and starred in. His 1990 film Young Wife: Modest Indecency was chosen as the second Best Film of the year at the 1990 Pink Grand Prix and Sano was given the award for Best Director. In 1991 he won the Best Director and Screenplay awards. In 1992 Sano's Molester: Peeping on Masturbation was awarded Best Film, and Sano was given the Best Director award for the third consecutive year.

== Sources ==
- "Kazuhiro Sano". Allmovie. Archived from the original on 2006-04-26.
- "KAZUHIRO SANO". The Complete Index to World Film.
- Kazuhiro Sano at IMDb
- "佐野和宏 (Sano Kazuhiro)" (in Japanese). Japanese Movie Database.
- Weisser, Thomas; Yuko Mihara Weisser (1998). "Spotlight: Four Kings of Pink (Kazuhiro Sano)". Japanese Cinema Encyclopedia: The Sex Films. Miami: Vital Books : Asian Cult Cinema Publications. pp. 457–462. ISBN 1-889288-52-7.

Awards and achievements
Pink Grand Prix
Preceded by Masahiro Kasai	Pink Grand Prix for Best Director; Kazuhiro Sano; 1990	Succeeded by Kazuhiro Sano
Preceded by Kazuhiro Sano	Pink Grand Prix for Best Director; Kazuhiro Sano; 1991	Succeeded by Kazuhiro Sano
Preceded by Kazuhiro Sano	Pink Grand Prix for Best Director; Kazuhiro Sano; 1992	Succeeded by Toshiki Satō
