= Kin'ichi Kusumi =

Japanese actor (born 1950)

- Born: September 23, 1950 (age 75); Kanagawa Prefecture, Japan

Kin'ichi Kusumi (久須美欽一, Kusumi Kin'ichi) (born September 23, 1950) is a Japanese actor who has also used the stage name Mamoru Kusumi (久須美護, Kusumi Mamoru). He has appeared in tokusatsu kaiju productions (monster movies) and in pink films.

== Life and career ==
Kusumi started appearing on Japanese TV as early as 1971 (under the name Mamoru Kusumi) when he played the role of Mirror Man in the Fuji TV superhero series of the same name, which ran from December 1971 to November 1972. In 1973, he was the giant Zone Fighter in the Nippon Television series, again using the name Mamoru Kusumi. Again under the same name, he played the monsters Anguirus and King Caesar in the 1974 Toho film Godzilla vs. Mechagodzilla.

Still as Mamoru Kusumi, by November 1977, he also started acting in the Japanese softcore pornographic genre of pink film with a starring role in the Pro Taka studio movie Ijou seiyoku ma (異常性欲魔) for director Seiji Izumi. Two years later, he starred in the pink film studio Shintōhō Eiga's 1979 film Molester Invisible Man Part 3: Obscene? (痴漢透明人間ＰＡＲＴ３わいせつ？, Chikan tōmei ningen part III waisetsu?) directed by Kōji Seki. He appeared in several more movies as Mamoru Kusumi but in 1982 started acting as Kin'ichi Kasumi, and according to the Japanese Movie Database, had made over 170 films by 2004.

The year 1985 saw Kusumi in two films for Shintōhō Eiga, Celebrating Together (痴漢奥まで覗く, Chikan oku made nozoku), directed Kōji Seki, and Ruff Trade (変態牝犬調教, Hentai mesuinu chōkyō) directed by Akifumi Kageyama and with a screenplay by Kazuyoshi Sekine.

Kusumi continued making films for Shintōhō Eiga in the 1990s with Latest Soap Technique (最新ソープテクニック, Saishin sōpu tekunikku) directed by Toshiya Ueno, one of the "Seven Lucky Gods of Pink". He also worked for the budget pink film studio Tokatsu in their May 1990 release Wicked Salesman (悪を売る不良セールス, Aku o uru foryō sērusu). In this movie, directed and written by Kōsuke Fujiwara, Kusumi plays a hapless newspaper salesman who receives some supernatural help in furthering his career through sexual techniques. Kusumi was the subject of an interview in the August 1994 issue of PG, a "[s]pecialist Japanese magazine on pink films."

In May 2002, Kusumi appeared with veteran AV Idol Hitomi Kobayashi in a pink film distributed by Xces Film, Kobayashi Hitomi idaki tai onna, idaka re tai onna (小林ひとみ 抱きたい女、抱かれたい女). Kusumi was still active in films in 2009 when he performed in Yatai no Oneesan: Tabegoro na Momojiri (屋台のお姉さん 食べごろな桃尻) with pink film actress Motoko Sasaki. The film was directed by Tarō Araki and released by OP Eiga in April 2009.

== Films ==
- Godzilla vs. Mechagodzilla (1974) as Anguirus, King Caesar
- The 6 Ultra Brothers vs. the Monster Army (1974)
- Molester Invisible Man Part 3: Obscene? (痴漢透明人間ＰＡＲＴ３わいせつ？, Chikan tōmei ningen part III waisetsu?), Shintōhō Eiga (May 1979), dir:Kōji Seki
- Za Reipu: Tōsaku Sekkusu (ザ・レイプ 倒錯ＳＥＸ), Million Film (February 1986), dir:Rumi Tama
- Latest Soap Technique (1990)
- Kaiman Hitomi: Nandemo Irasshai (貝満ひとみ 何でもいらっしゃい！), Xces Film (August 1991), dir:Sachi Hamano
- Chikan Densha: Hentai Urawazashi (痴漢電車 変態裏わざ師), Xces Film (November 1991), dir:Sachi Hamano
- Za Honban: Seikan Taihisho (ザ・本番 性感帯秘書), Xces Film (July 1992), dir:Sachi Hamano

== Television ==
- Redman as Redman
- Mirrorman as Mirrorman
- Ike! Godman
- Zone Fighter as Zone Fighter
- Ultraman Ace as Zoffy, Alien Steal
- Ultraman Leo as Astra (uncredited)
