= Izumi Aki =

Japanese actress

- Born: 15 May 1960 (age 66); Japan
- Other name: Yasuko Takahashi
- Occupation: Actress

Izumi Aki (亜希 いずみ, Aki Izumi), a.k.a. Yasuko Takahashi (高橋 靖子, Takahashi Yasuko) (born May 15, 1960), is a Japanese actress especially known for her roles in pink film.

Izumi made her pink film debut in October 1980 in Ryōjoku gishiki (凌辱儀式) produced by Shishi Pro (Shishi Puro (獅子プロ)) and released by Toei. In the next four years, Aki appeared in about sixty pink films primarily for the Shintōhō Eiga and Million Film studios. In November 1981 she had a role in actress Rumi Tama's debut as a director in the pink film Revenge Sex: Girl Rape (復讐セックス 女が犯す) distributed by Million Film. Aki starred in two low-budget films directed by Hiroki Hirakawa, the August 1982 Sex Documentary: Rape and Abuse (セックスドキュメント 器具販売人) and the April 1983 production Prostitution Inquisition (トルコ拷問 抉る) for Million Film.

In June 1984 Aki starred in Meow Meow Girl (ニャンニャン娘, Nyan nyan-musume), an entry in Nikkatsu's Roman Porno series, directed by Genji Nakamura, one of "The Three Pillars Of Pink". In one of her last pink film roles, in February 1985 she played opposite actor and director Yutaka Ikejima in another Million Film production Woman in the Black Lingerie (黒い下着の女).

After marrying the film director Kazuyoshi Sekine her pink film acting career seemed to have ended. Izumi later returned to the screen in 1999, starring in Hatsujō midare zuma (発情乱れ妻).
