= Serpent's Path =

Serpent's Path may refer to:

- Serpent's Path (1998 film), a Japanese crime thriller film
- Serpent's Path (2024 film), a French-language remake of the 1998 film
