= Chime (film) =

2024 Japanese thriller short film

- Theatrical release poster
- Japanese: チャイム
- Directed by: Kiyoshi Kurosawa
- Written by: Kiyoshi Kurosawa
- Produced by: Misaki Kawamura; Hideyuki Okamoto; Miyuki Tanaka
- Starring: Mutsuo Yoshioka; Seiichi Kohinata; Hana Amano; Junpei Yasui; Koji Seki; Giiko
- Cinematography: Koichi Furuya
- Edited by: Azusa Yamazaki
- Music by: Takuma Watanabe
- Production companies: Sunborn Inc.; C&I Entertainment Inc.
- Distributed by: Roadstead
- Release dates: February 19, 2024 (Berlin); April 12, 2024 (Japan)
- Running time: 45 minutes
- Country: Japan
- Language: Japanese
- Box office: $165,329

Chime (Japanese: チャイム, Hepburn: Chaimu) is a 2024 Japanese psychological horror short film written and directed by Kiyoshi Kurosawa. It stars Mutsuo Yoshioka as a cooking teacher, whose life is disrupted by a chime which induces violent and erratic behaviour in those who hear it.

Chime premiered at the 74th Berlin International Film Festival in February 2024. It went on to be distributed as an NFT (non-fungible token) via Roadstead, a Japanese platform for "digital video trading" which also produced the film. It received positive reviews.

== Plot ==
Matsuoka is a cooking teacher. While most students in his class are able to cook calmly and complete their tasks, one student, Tashiro, is distant from the rest, and struggles to complete his work. Tashiro asks Matsuoka if he can hear a 'chime', saying he believes it is a message for him. Matsuoka brushes him off, and Tashiro becomes briefly aggressive.

As Matsuoka is leaving school, another student informs him that Tashiro asked for his address, which they refused to give out. Matsuoka goes on to attend an interview for a job at a restaurant, where he informs the interviewer he will quit his teaching job if hired. In the next lesson, Matsuoka speaks with Tashiro again, who tells him that a surgery has replaced half of his brain with a machine, controlling him on behalf of the chime. In attempting to prove this, he kills himself by cutting into his own neck with a knife. After a detective interviews those present, Matsuoka returns home and eats quietly with his family, not mentioning what has happened.

Matsuoka shows another student, Akemi, how to butcher a chicken. After she refuses to follow his example, he abruptly and emotionlessly stabs her to death and then hides her body in a sleeping bag to bury her in the countryside. When he returns to school the following day, a student informs him the detective has returned, investigating Akemi's disappearance. A second student rushes downstairs, informing him that Akemi is upstairs waiting for him. Matsuoka and the student hurry upstairs, but they find only an empty chair where the student had seen Akemi. Something by the chair terrifies the student, and she runs out of the room. A couple of seconds later, Matsuoka sees the same, and he runs in terror. Outside, he encounters the detective, who notices a bandaid on Matsuoka's hand, which he attributes to a kitchen accident.

Matsuoka attends a second interview at the restaurant, where he rants about himself; he is ultimately refused the job. As the interview ends, a customer at one table attempts to stab another patron and is restrained. At home, Matsuoka argues with his son after being asked for money, and he contemplates killing him. He walks around his house distraught. The intercom rings, but the camera shows only flickering lights. When it rings a second time, he goes outside, finding nobody at the door. Matsuoka walks around the street, before returning to his home. The film ends with him closing the door behind him.

== Cast ==
- Mutsuo Yoshioka as Takuji Matsuoka, a cooking teacher
- Seiichi Kohinata as Ichiro Tashiro, an unusual student in Matsuoka's class
- Hana Amano as Akemi Hishida, another cooking student
- Junpei Yasui as Sakuma
- Kôji Seki as Yoshizawa
- Giiko as Hiroko Tachibana
- Ikkei Watanabe as Detective Makoto Otsuki

== Release ==
The film first screened on 19 February 2024 as part of the 74th Berlin International Film Festival.

Chime was released as an NFT to Roadstead.io on April 12, 2024, where individual digital copies of the film were sold in the form of "Supertickets", which could be rented or resold to other users. Owners also received access to Les Cuisiniers of Chime, a behind-the-scenes documentary.

In October, the film was shown at Beyond Fest, a Los Angeles-based film festival, and in December, it was screened as a part of the Jogja-NETPAC Asian Film Festival in Jakarta, Indonesia.

Janus Films acquired American distribution rights to Chime in 2026. The film had a limited release at the IFC Center in New York on March 24, alongside a 4k restoration of Kurosawa's 1998 thriller Serpent's Path by Kadokawa with a national release starting in Los Angeles on 10 April. Janus Films noted that Chime would only play in theaters.

== Reception ==
Writing for Polygon, Austen Goslin said it was "perfectly calibrated to unsettle viewers", and described it as one of the "best horror movies of the year so far". The Film Stage's Rory O'Connor described it as a film that "keeps secrets guarded and lives off the shocks of its knife-edge turns".
