= Kin'ichi =

- Gender: Male

Origin
- Origin: Japanese
- Meaning: Different meanings depending on the kanji used

Kin'ichi or Kinichi (written: 欽壹 or 欽一) is a masculine Japanese given name. Notable people with the name include:

- Azumafuji Kin'ichi (東富士 欽壹; 1921–1973), Japanese sumo wrestler
- Kinichi Hagimoto (萩本 欽一; born 1941), Japanese comedian
- Kin'ichi Kusumi (久須美 欽一; born 1950), Japanese actor

Fictional characters:

- Kinichi Tohyama, a character from anime series Aria the Scarlet Ammo
