= Sekine =

Sekine (Arabic: سكينه) is a kind of dua (pray). It is a Japanese surname. Notable people with the surname include:

- Akiko Sekine, athlete
- Akira Sekine, Japanese voice actress
- Kazumi Sekine, film director
- Keiko Sekine, maiden name of actress Keiko Takahashi
- Nobuo Sekine (関根 伸夫, 1942–2019), Japanese sculptor
- Shinobu Sekine (1943–2018), judoka
- Shiori Sekine, bassist for the Japanese indie band, Base Ball Bear
- Thomas T. Sekine (1933–2022), economist
- Tsutomu Sekine, Japanese comedian and television presenter

== See also ==
- 9960 Sekine, a main-belt asteroid
- Sekine Station, a railway station in Yonezawa
