= Rumi Tama =

Japanese director, actress, and screenwriter

- Born: Rumi Otani; January 15, 1949 (age 77); Setagaya, Tokyo, Japan
- Occupations: Actress; Film director Screenwriter
- Years active: 1965 –
- Partner: Akitaka Kimata

Rumi Tama (珠瑠美, Tama Rumi) (also, 珠るみ, 珠ルミ) aka Rumi Kimata (木俣瑠美, Kimata Rumi) is a Japanese film director, actress, and screenwriter, known for her work in the pink film genre. After making her acting debut in 1965, she appeared in independent pink films throughout the rest of the decade, often for director Akitaka Kimata, whom she would later marry, and his son Seiji Izumi. Tama took a brief retirement in the early 1970s, then began appearing in films in Nikkatsu's Roman Porno series in 1975. She began directing in 1981, helming at least 80 films as of 2002.

== Life and career ==
=== Early life and career ===
Rumi Tama was born Rumi Otani (小谷瑠美) on January 15, 1949, in Tokyo's Setagaya neighborhood. Her family had close ties to the film industry. Her father was a set designer at Daiei Film, and her uncle was the cinematographer Kimio Watanabe at the same studio. Tama's brother was employed at Toei as a lighting technician. Her sister also became a pink film actress, following Tama's entry into the field, appearing in Masao Adachi's Rebel Woman: Dream Hell (叛女・夢幻地獄; 1970). Using the stagename Michiko Tani (谷身知子, Tani Michiko), her career mostly involved acting in supporting roles in films with Tama.

Rumi Tama made her film debut as an actress in the 1965 Tokyo Eiga pink film release, Naked Girl Mountain Range (裸女山脈). She starred in many of these independent softcore theatrical films throughout the rest of the decade, appearing often in films by Akitaka Kimata (木俣堯喬) and his son Akiyoshi, who was born in 1946 and directed under the stagename Seiji Izumi (和泉聖治). These films were produced through Kimata's Pro Taka, and usually distributed by Million Film. Akitaka Kimata was born in 1915 and founded Pro Taka as a pink film production company in 1965. His first film in the genre, River of Flesh, was directed by his son, and included Tama in the cast. Tama would later marry Akitaka Kimata, becoming his third wife.

Typical of the films Tama made with her future husband was Pervert (Koshokuma, 1968), in which she was cast as one of the victims of a college professor who enjoys capturing women for torture. Tama received attention particularly for her role in Shin'ya Yamamoto (director)'s Both Sides of Prostitution (売春うら表; 1969). She retired from the film industry for a time in the early 1970s to devote time to her family.

=== Acting at Nikkatsu ===
Rumi Tama came out of retirement to act for the major film studio Nikkatsu in 1975, and appeared in their Roman Porno films for the next six years. In order to offset the loss of many filmmakers who had left when the studio changed its production to almost solely its Roman Porno series in 1971, Nikkatsu recruited performers from the pink film world. An admirer of Tama, Nikkatsu director Shogorō Nishimura was instrumental in the studio's decision to hire the actress to star in their Apartment Wife series.

The Apartment Wife series was one of the leading titles in Nikkatsu's Roman Porno genre. Nikkatsu inaugurated its Roman porno line with Nishimura's Apartment Wife: Affair In the Afternoon (1971), and its success ensured the continuation of the Roman Porno direction the studio took for the next 17 years. The "Apartment Wife" series had made Roman Porno "queens" out of Kazuko Shirakawa and then Junko Miyashita, who starred in eight entries in the series. Nikkatsu chose Tama to be Miyashita's successor in the series, and her debut film for the studio was Nishimura's New Apartment Wife: Prostitution Group Building 13 (新・団地妻 売春グループ１３号館; 1975). Tama's husband Akitaka Kimata also came out of retirement to write the script for Tama's second "Apartment Wife" episode, New Apartment Wife: Blue Film Woman (新・団地妻 ブルーフィルムの女; 1975). This film is credited with rejuvenating the series. Its story, in which a husband discovers that his wife has been appearing in pornography without his knowledge, has been cited as an influence on the Angel Guts series (1978–1994). Tama refused to act in the next entry in the Apartment Wife series, director Shinichi Shiratori's New Apartment Wife: Swapping (新・団地妻 夫婦交換; 1975), complaining that the script was inferior.

Among the films in which Tama acted for Seiji Izumi, her future stepson, during this era were Sex Document: Serial Rapists (連続婦女暴行魔; 1975), which Jasper Sharp describes as "Pinku eiga at its most mean-spirited and thuggish". Sharp notes that the film, while not very explicit, is nonetheless disturbing due to its sober depictions of a series of assaults. He comments that Tama performing these scenes for her future-stepson director lends the film some inadvertently Freudian connotations.

Tama starred for Shogorō Nishimura again in Extreme Indulgence Woman: Pleasure Deep Within a.k.a. Lady Ecstasy: Pleasure Profound (淫絶夫人 快楽の奥; 1976). This film had Tama straying far from her "Apartment Wife" persona, playing the role of a woman who has served prison time for physically abusing her unfaithful husband. Upon her release from incarceration she goes on a love-making spree with the intent of exacting revenge on her ex-husband by seducing his mistress' lover. Though Nishimura was an enthusiastic supporter of Tama, most of their collaborations are not ranked among the best efforts of either of the two.

Tama played pop-singer-turned-Roman Porno-actress Runa Takamura's mother in Kōyū Ohara's 1976 Roman Porno, Runa's Confession: The Men Who Flocked Around Me (ルナの告白 私に群がった男たち), based on Takamura's life. Known as the "King of Pop Art Porn", director Ohara again worked with Tama in the 1978 nunsploitation film, Sister Lucia's Dishonor (修道女ルシア 辱す, Shūdōjo Lucia: Kegasu). Tama returned to the Apartment Wife series in 1978, for Apartment Wife: Night By Ourselves. She and Akitaka Kimata were married on September 15, 1978.

=== Directing ===
In the early 1980s, Rumi Tama began directing, becoming one of the few women to direct in the pink film genre. According to publicity from the Ōkura Eiga studio (later renamed OP Eiga), Kyōko Ōgimachi was the first female director of a pink film when she helmed Yakuza Geisha in 1965. Pink film industry insiders, however, doubt the veracity of this claim, noting that Ōgimachi was the mistress of Mitsugu Ōkura, head of the studio, and that he was known for showing preferential treatment to Ōgimachi. After this film, Ōgimachi never directed again. Sachi Hamano was the first significant female pink film director. She debuted in 1971 and founded her own studio in 1984. Rumi Tama made her debut as a director in 1981 with the film Revenge Sex: Girl Rape (復讐セックス 女が犯す). By 2002 she had directed and scripted about eighty films, most of which were produced and distributed by her husband's Pro Taka and Million Film studios. Her later films were distributed by Exces.

Tama's College Girl: Pretty Sacrifice (女子大生 可憐ないけにえ; 1983), distributed by Million Film, is a rape and revenge film involving a college-aged protagonist who avenges herself against her abusers: her father and her professor. Some of Tama's directorial credits are Molester and Divorcee (痴漢と離婚妻; 1985), Swaying Huge Breasts 103cm (揺れる巨乳１０３ｃｍ; 1989), and Young Wife: SM Confinement (若奥様 ＳＭ監禁; 1991).

During the late 1990s, Tama worked in Shintōhō Eiga's "Hard Porno" line of videos. Her last directorial effort, as of 2009, was the V-cinema Aphrodisiac (媚薬; 2002).

== Bibliography ==
=== English ===
- "RUMI TAMA". Complete Index to World Film.
- Rumi Tama at IMDb
- Sharp, Jasper (2008). Behind the Pink Curtain: The Complete History of Japanese Sex Cinema. Guildford: FAB Press. ISBN 978-1-903254-54-7.
- Weisser, Thomas; Yuko Mihara Weisser (1998). Japanese Cinema Encyclopedia: The Sex Films. Miami: Vital Books : Asian Cult Cinema Publications. p. 237. ISBN 1-889288-52-7.

=== Japanese ===
- 木俣瑠美 きまた・るみ (in Japanese). allcinema.net.
- 珠瑠美( 出演/監督/製作 ) (in Japanese). Kinema Junpo. Archived from the original on 2012-03-09.
- 珠瑠美 (in Japanese). Japanese Movie Database.
- 珠瑠美(タマルミ)の映画作品 (in Japanese). www.walkerplus.com.
