= Cloud (film) =

2024 Japanese thriller film

- Theatrical release poster
- Japanese: クラウド
- Directed by: Kiyoshi Kurosawa
- Written by: Kiyoshi Kurosawa
- Starring: Masaki Suda
- Cinematography: Yasuyuki Sasaki
- Music by: Takuma Watanabe
- Production companies: Nikkatsu; Tokyo Theatres Company
- Release dates: August 30, 2024 (Venice); September 27, 2024 (Japan)
- Running time: 123 minutes
- Country: Japan
- Language: Japanese
- Box office: $1 million

Cloud (Japanese: クラウド, Hepburn: Kuraudo) is a 2024 Japanese psychological thriller film written and directed by Kiyoshi Kurosawa, and starring Masaki Suda.

The film premiered out of competition at the 81st Venice International Film Festival, on 30 August 2024. It was selected for the Best International Feature Film as the Japanese entry at the 97th Academy Awards, but was not nominated.

== Plot summary ==
Yoshii is a factory worker who moonlights as an online reseller. He is first seen ripping off a supplier of health devices, which he later sells online at a substantial markup. After turning a profit, he turns down a promotion from his boss in order to expand his reselling business instead. He resigns from his job and moves into a larger house in a suburb, which he also uses as an office and warehouse, and asks his girlfriend Akiko to move in with him. He also hires an assistant, Sano, to help run the business.

Tension escalates as Yoshii becomes more ruthless in his dealings. He is harassed both online and in real life, and meanwhile, Akiko, feeling increasingly neglected by Yoshii’s coldness and preoccupation with his business, moves out. Yoshii fires Sano after he suggests potential new products to target.

As everyone in Yoshii's life leaves, his disgruntled suppliers and customers grow more emboldened through an online forum. When Yoshii’s new address is found, some of them decide to band together to enact revenge. An angry mobster is also joined by Yoshii’s jaded senior and former boss from work. They arm themselves and threaten Yoshii at his home. Yoshii escapes into the woods, leading to a cat-and-mouse chase. He manages to shake them off and, on his way back home, runs into Akiko. The two plan to salvage what’s left and flee. However, the group finds Yoshii again, and this time, succeeds in kidnapping him.

The group intend to burn Yoshii alive and stream it online. Akiko secretly follows them. Sano, revealed to have shady connections himself, tracks Yoshii’s phone via GPS and intervenes. He guns down several attackers and rescues Yoshii. Yoshii asks him why he'd go so far after having been fired as his assistant. They engage in a deadly shootout with the assailants and eliminate them. Outside, Yoshii meets Akiko, who had returned shortly after the house was attacked. Yoshii goes to embrace her, only to realize she intends to shoot him dead to get his credit cards. However, inexperienced in firing a gun, she is shot by Sano.

The final scene shows Sano and Yoshii driving into the distance. Sano urges Yoshii to keep working and making a profit, promising him whatever Yoshii could ever want, “even things that can end the world”. Yoshii mutters, “So this is how you get into Hell”, leaving Sano’s true nature and their situation ambiguous.

== Cast ==
- Masaki Suda as Ryosuke Yoshii, an internet reseller
- Kotone Furukawa as Akiko, Yoshii's lover
- Daiken Okudaira as Sano, Yoshii's assistant
- Amane Okayama as Miyake, a man who resides in an internet cafe
- Yoshiyoshi Arakawa as Takimoto, who owns the factory where Yoshii works
- Masataka Kubota as Muraoka, who brings Yoshii into the online resale business
- Yutaka Matsushige as the yakuza
- Masaaki Akahori as Tonoyama Souichi, factory president
- Maho Yamada as Chizuru, Tonoyama's wife
- Mutsuo Yoshioka as Yabe
- Yusei Mikawa as Inoue
- Toshihiro Yagi as Hojo, a police officer
- Yoshiyuki Morishita as Murota
- Tetsuya Chiba as the hunter

== Release ==
Cloud premiered out of competition at the 81st Venice International Film Festival. The film was released in Japan on September 27, 2024 and was selected as Japan's entry for best international film for 97th Academy Awards.

It was also selected for the Gala Presentation at the 29th Busan International Film Festival on October 3, 2024 and for the MAMI Mumbai Film Festival 2024 under the World Cinema section.

== Reception ==
=== Critical response ===
On the review aggregator website Rotten Tomatoes, 90% of 52 critics' reviews are positive. The website's consensus reads: "Writer-director Kiyoshi Kurosawa returns to the theme of technology being a haunting force with disturbing success in Cloud, a slow-burn examination of social media that ends with a bang." Metacritic, which uses a weighted average, assigned the film a score of 76 out of 100, based on 25 critics, indicating "generally favorable" reviews.

=== Accolades ===
Award	Ceremony date	Category	Recipient	Result	Ref.
Sitges Film Festival	13 October 2024	Best Feature Film	Cloud	Nominated	

== See also ==
- Cinema of Japan
- List of submissions to the 97th Academy Awards for Best International Feature Film
- List of Japanese submissions for the Academy Award for Best International Feature Film
