= Hiroyuki Yoshikawa =

Japanese engineer (born 1933)

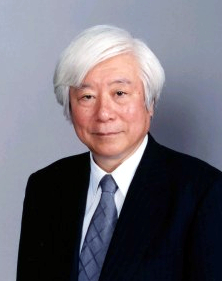
- Yoshikawa in 2005
- Born: August 5, 1933 (age 93); Tokyo, Empire of Japan
- Occupation: 25th President of the University of Tokyo

Academic background
- Education: Faculty of Engineering, University of Tokyo

Academic work
- Discipline: precision engineering

Hiroyuki Yoshikawa (吉川弘之) is a Japanese engineer. He specialises in precision engineering and general design theory. He served as the 25th president of the University of Tokyo and the 20th and 21st president of the Science Council of Japan. He is a member of the Japan Academy and a recipient of the Grand Cordon of the Order of the Sacred Treasure.

== Career ==
After graduating from the University of Tokyo (UTokyo) in 1956, he began his career as an engineer at Mitsubishi Shipbuilding. He later returned to academia, earning his PhD from UTokyo in 1964. He remained in academia and became a professor at UTokyo in 1978. He is known for advocating a new perspective in design and engineering, one that does not overly focus on achieving local optima in individual fields, but rather aims to achieve a global optimum and maximise the outcome of the work. He coined the term 'modern evils' to describe the unwanted outcomes that human efforts for a better world have created. He maintains that addressing this issue requires this new perspective, which bridges fragmented academic disciplines to synthesise new solutions and artificial objects.

When the Second World War ended, we welcomed peace and the hope that from now on the world would use scientific knowledge to create prosperous and secure societies, and indeed we have been on that path. We have managed to live through the era of local conflicts and problems, but now that hope has been betrayed. We are now in an age of global environmental degradation and global warming, resulting in an increase in natural disasters, epidemics worldwide, intensifying conflicts and increasing inequalities, and the outbreak of horrific wars that take many lives, filling the world with countless challenges. These conundrums are diverse and their solution requires knowledge from many disciplines. To solve this situation, mankind must consider that the time has come when it is necessary to use all the knowledge it possesses. To this end, scientists must not only protect and produce knowledge in their own field, but also conduct research to use knowledge to solve difficult problems, in association with knowledge from other fields. The results of this work will provide advice to actors in society, and action to solve difficult problems will be generated, supported by many fields of study.

— Hiroyuki Yoshikawa, December 2022

Academic offices
Preceded by Akito Arima	President of University of Tokyo; April 1993 – March 1997	Succeeded by Shigehiko Hasumi
