= Real (2013 film) =

- Theatrical release poster
- Directed by: Kiyoshi Kurosawa
- Written by: Kiyoshi Kurosawa; Sachiko Tanaka
- Based on: A Perfect Day for Plesiosaur by Rokuro Inui
- Starring: Takeru Satoh; Haruka Ayase
- Cinematography: Akiko Ashizawa
- Edited by: Takashi Saito
- Music by: Kei Haneoka
- Production company: Twins Japan
- Distributed by: Toho
- Release date: 1 June 2013 (Japan)
- Running time: 127 minutes
- Country: Japan
- Language: Japanese
- Box office: $3,801,975

Real (Japanese: リアル〜完全なる首長竜の日〜, Hepburn: Riaru: Kanzen Naru Kubinagaryū no Hi) is a 2013 Japanese science fiction drama film directed by Kiyoshi Kurosawa, starring Takeru Satoh and Haruka Ayase. It is Kurosawa's first feature film since Tokyo Sonata (2008). It is based on Rokuro Inui's novel A Perfect Day for Plesiosaur. It was released in Japan on 1 June 2013.

== Plot ==
Suffering from writer's block, a manga artist Atsumi (Haruka Ayase) has attempted suicide and is in a coma. Koichi (Takeru Satoh), Atsumi's lover, tries to awaken her. With help from doctors Aihara (Miki Nakatani) and Yonemura (Keisuke Horibe), Koichi enters the mind of Atsumi by using the experimental technology called "sensing".

== Cast ==
- Takeru Satoh as Koichi Fujita
- Haruka Ayase as Atsumi Kazu
- Miki Nakatani as Eiko Aihara
- Joe Odagiri as Sawano
- Shota Sometani as Shingo Takagi
- Keisuke Horibe as Yonemura
- Yutaka Matsushige as Haruhiko
- Kyōko Koizumi as Makiko

== Release ==
The film was released in Japan on 1 June 2013. It also screened at the 2013 Locarno Festival, the 2013 Toronto International Film Festival, and the 2013 New York Film Festival.

== Reception ==
On review aggregator website Rotten Tomatoes, the film holds an approval rating of 57%, with an average rating of 5.85/10, based on 7 reviews.

Eric Kohn of IndieWire gave the film a B− grade, saying: "While the two main leads share enough chemistry to inject their drama with purpose, it's hardly enough to justify the two hour-plus journey." Maggie Lee of Variety had a mixed reaction, describing the films as "Kiyoshi Kurosawa at his least disturbing or mesmerizing," and said: "Although the aesthetics retain the Nipponese horror maestro's trademark haunting quality, the yarn's U-turn from psycho-horror to hokey childlike fable is unexpected and disappointing". Boyd Van Hoeij of The Hollywood Reporter praised the production design by Takeshi Shimizu.
