= Lily Festival =

2001 film by Sachi Hamano

- Directed by: Sachi Hamano
- Written by: Kuninori Yamazaki
- Starring: Kazuko Yoshiyuki; Mickey Curtis
- Cinematography: Katsuji Oyamada
- Edited by: Naoki Kaneko
- Music by: Shigemi Yoshioka
- Distributed by: Tantan-sha Company
- Release date: August 26, 2001
- Running time: 100 minutes
- Country: Japan
- Language: Japanese

Lily Festival (百合祭, Yurisai) is a 2001 Japanese movie directed by Sachi Hamano, based on the novel Yurisai by Houko Momotani. The film focuses on the sexuality of older women and won the Jury Prize for "Best Feature - Lesbian" at the Philadelphia International Gay & Lesbian Film Festival.

== Cast and characters ==
- Kazuko Yoshiyuki as Rie Miyano
- Mickey Curtis as Terujiro Miyoshi
- Utae Shoji as Umeka Mariko
- Kazuko Shirakawa as Renako Yokota
- Sanae Nakahara as Teruko Satoyama
- Chisako Hara as Atsuko Namiki

== See also ==
- Tokyo International Lesbian & Gay Film Festival
- List of LGBT-related films directed by women
