= Bright Future (film) =

- Film poster
- Directed by: Kiyoshi Kurosawa
- Written by: Kiyoshi Kurosawa
- Produced by: Takashi Asai
- Starring: Joe Odagiri; Tadanobu Asano; Tatsuya Fuji
- Cinematography: Takahide Shibanushi
- Edited by: Kiyoshi Kurosawa
- Music by: Pacific 231 (Shigeomi Hasumi, Takemasa Miyake)
- Distributed by: Uplink Company (Japan); Palm Pictures (U.S.)
- Release date: January 18, 2003 (Japan)
- Running time: 115 minutes (Original Version); 92 minutes (International Version)
- Country: Japan
- Language: Japanese
- Box office: $5,166 (US)

Bright Future (Japanese: アカルイミライ, Hepburn: Akarui Mirai) is a 2003 Japanese drama film written, directed, and edited by Kiyoshi Kurosawa, starring Tadanobu Asano, Joe Odagiri and Tatsuya Fuji. It was entered into the 2003 Cannes Film Festival.

== Plot ==
Yuji Nimura (Joe Odagiri) and Mamoru Arita (Tadanobu Asano) are two factory workers, who are constantly irritated by their boss, Fujiwara (Takashi Sasano). Mamoru entrusts his poisonous jellyfish, which he has been acclimating to fresh water, to Nimura.

Nimura goes to Fujiwara's house one night with the intent of hurting Fujiwara, only to find that Mamoru has already murdered him and his wife. Mamoru is convicted of the murder but commits suicide on death row, leaving Nimura a private message to "go ahead." Meanwhile, Mamoru's jellyfish escapes its tank and reproduces in the waterways of the city.

Mamoru's divorced father, Shinichiro (Tatsuya Fuji), takes Nimura in. Nimura helps with Shinichiro's electronics salvage business, but leaves after the two argue about Nimura's future.

Nimura takes a job at his sister's office and later falls in with a gang of youths. He helps the group gain after-hours access to the office, which they rob and vandalize. The police arrest the gang but Nimura escapes.

With nowhere to go, Nimura seeks refuge with Shinichiro, who forgives him, saying that he can "stay forever." Later, the two see a large school of jellyfish in a river, making their way to the sea. Excitedly, Shinichiro wades into the river to see the jellyfish and is stung, rendering him unconscious though not badly hurt.

The last scene of the film returns to the gang of youths, laughing as they question what might have come of Nimura. One of the young men believes he sees Nimura outside, but is mistaken. The final tracking shot transitioning into the end credits follows the gang of youths as they aimlessly wander the street.

== Cast ==
- Joe Odagiri – Yûji Nimura
- Tadanobu Asano – Mamoru Arita
- Tatsuya Fuji – Shinichiro Arita
- Takashi Sasano – Mr. Fujiwara
- Marumi Shiraishi – Mrs. Fujiwara
- Sayuri Oyamada
- Hanawa
- Ryo Kase
- Yoshiyuki Morishita
- Sakichi Sato
- Kenichi Matsuyama

== Reception ==
On the review aggregator website Rotten Tomatoes, 71% of 21 critics' reviews are positive. The website's consensus reads: "Flawed yet alluring, Bright Future slowly draws the viewer into an enigmatic world of surreal imagery and entrancing ambiguity." Metacritic, which uses a weighted average, assigned the film a score of 64 out of 100, based on 11 critics, indicating "generally favorable" reviews.

Ed Gonzalez of Slant Magazine gave Bright Future 2 and a half stars out of 4. Manohla Dargis of The New York Times gave the film a favorable review, saying: "One of the pleasures of Mr. Kurosawa's films is how casually he tosses in ideas about contemporary life, the state of the family, the place of technology, all while steadily shredding your nerves." Scott Tobias of The A.V. Club felt that the final tracking shot of the film is mesmerizing.
