= Shigehiko Hasumi =

Japanese film critic

- Born: April 29, 1936 (age 90); Tokyo, Japan
- Education: University of Tokyo
- Occupation: Film critic
- Spouse: Chantal Van Melkebeke
- Children: Shigeomi Hasumi
- Writing career
- Language: Japanese, French, English
- Period: 1974-present

Japanese name
- Kanji: 蓮實 重彥
- Hiragana: はすみ しげひこ
- Katakana: ハスミ シゲヒコ
Transcriptions
- Romanization: Hasumi Shigehiko
- Website: www.mube.jp

Shigehiko Hasumi (Japanese: 蓮實重彥, also romanized Shiguéhiko; born 29 April 1936) is a Japanese literary critic, film critic, French literature scholar, and novelist. He was a professor at the University of Tokyo (Cultural Studies, or the Study of Culture and Representation), dean of the College of Arts and Sciences, and the 26th President (1997-2001).

Hasumi started his academic career as a Gustave Flaubert scholar, and played a central role in the early introduction of the contemporary French philosophy, such as Gilles Deleuze and Michel Foucault, into Japan in the 1970s. He is known as one of the most prolific Japanese reviewers of modern literature and film.

Since the 1980s, Hasumi has been active in introducing the French New Wave filmmakers' thought and Hollywood B-films. His method of viewing and writing about film, inspired by the 1950s French film criticism appearing in Cahiers du Cinéma, played a major role in Japanese film culture in the late 20th century. His influential work includes Directed by Yasujiro Ozu (1983). Reflecting on Hasumi, Kiyoshi Kurosawa noted, "The international recognition of Yasujiro Ozu and Mikio Naruse would never have been achieved without Hasumi. Even the popularity of Clint Eastwood and Wim Wenders in Japan owes much to his influence. And as for myself—there’s no doubt that I’m only able to be here, doing what I do, all thanks to the good fortune of having met Shiguéhiko Hasumi."

He is married to Chantal Van Melkebeke, the daughter of the Belgian painter, journalist, and writer Jacques Van Melkebeke, who is known for having been the first chief editor of Tintin magazine. They had one son, Shigeomi Hasumi.

In 1970, the French Broadcasting and Television Office interviewed him, his wife and his son in French in Tokyo for 20 minutes.

Hasumi curated a film series entitled Shiguéhiko Hasumi: Another History of the Movie in America and Japan for Japan Society in 2025, including works by Richard Fleischer, Michael Mann and Makoto Sato. Director Sho Miyake attended, presenting his collaboration with Hasumi—the montage film John Ford and Throwing.

== Life and work ==
Shigehiko Hasumi was born in Tokyo in 1936 as the son of Shigeyasu Hasumi, an art historian known for his study on Japanese traditional art of Sesshu Toyo.

He studied at the University of Tokyo and later the University of Paris, where he specialized in Gustave Flaubert and actively translated French post-structuralist texts into Japanese.

As a French literature scholar, his main works include *Portrait of a mediocre artist: Maxime du Camp (Bonyō na Geijutsuka no Shōzō)(1988) and *A Study of Madame Bovary (Bovary Fujin-ron) (2014). His introductory works of contemporary French philosophy include: *Criticism, or the Celebration of Temporal Death (Hihyō Aruiwa Kashi no Saiten) (1974) and Foucault, Deleuze and Derrida (1978).

What made Hasumi widely popular in Japan is his vast amount of literary and film criticism outside of academia. In his literary criticism, he published his views on Soseki Natsume, Kenzaburo Oe, and other Japanese contemporary novelists.

As a film critic, Hasumi used the way of viewing the details of films of Cahiers du Cinéma and re-evaluated Hollywood films, directed by such auteurs as Howard Hawks, John Ford, Don Siegel, Nicholas Ray, Richard Fleischer and other directors. Since traditional Japanese film criticism heavily focused on the viewers' impression and meaning of the narrative, Hasumi's new film writings of the screen detail shocked the Japanese film culture in the 1980s, and created many followers. His Directed by Yasujiro Ozu (1986) is known as a landmark of his film criticism, and believed as one of the most influential work in film writings in the late 20th century Japan.

Hasumi is known for his wide network among the international filmmakers, including Wim Wenders or Daniel Schmid. He presided over the committee of the Lion of the Year competition in the Venice Film Festival (2001). Hasumi's film lectures in his early days in Tokyo attracted young Japanese filmmakers, such as Kiyoshi Kurosawa, Masayuki Suo, and Shinji Aoyama. Hasumi is also known as a novelist and published two fictional work: *A Collapsed Land (Kanbotsu Chitai)(1986) and *A Countess (Hakushaku Fujin).(2016). His wife Chantal Van Melkebeke is a teacher from Belgium.

=== His name ===
His personal name has been spelt variously as Shigehiko, the standard Hepburn romanization, Shiguehiko and Shiguéhiko on his publications. For example, his biography of Yasujirō Ozu features the name Shiguéhiko on both the original Japanese and the French translation, whereas many translations of his books feature the form Shigehiko.

== Selected bibliography ==
- Directed by Yasujiro Ozu, tr. by Ryan Cook, U. Of California Press, 2024. ISBN 978-0-520-39672-2 (Kantoku Ozu Yasujirō, 1983)

Articles

- "Signification du mouvement bercant de l'eau dans le roman de Gustave Flaubert: Madame Bovary," Etudes de langue et litterature francaises, Volume 10, 1967.
- "The eloquence of the taciturn: an essay on Hou Hsiao-Hsien," Inter-Asia cultural studies, Volume 9, Issue 2, 2008.
- "Fiction and the 'Unrepresentable'," Theory, culture & society, Volume 26, Issue 2-3, 2009.
- "Absence d'Emma Bovary : 'Réalité textuelle' de la fiction," MLN, Volume 125, Issue 4, 2010.
- "For the Liberation of a Pluralist Thinking," Cultural politics, Volume 11, Issue 3, 2015, p. 301
- "Identiques et différentes – à propos des répétitions dans Madame Bovary," Flaubert, Issue 20, 2018.
- "Le cinéma comme institution," Ebisu : etudes japonaises, Volume 59, Issue 59, 2022.

== Books in Japanese ==
- Hihyō Aruiwa Kashi no Saiten (1974)
- Han Nihongo Ron (1977)
- Natsume Sōseki Ron (1978)
- Eiga no Shinwagaku (1979)
- Eizō no Shigaku (1979)
- Hyōsō Hihyō Sengen (1979)
- Cinema no Kioku Sōchi (1979)
- Eiga: Yūwaku no Ekurichūru (1983)
- Kantoku Ozu Yasujirō (1983)
- Monogatari Hihan Josetsu (1985)
- Kanbotsu Chitai (1986)
- Bonyō na Geijutsuka no Shōzō (1988)
- Shōsetsu Kara Tōku Hanarete (1989)
- Teikoku no Inbō (1991)
- Hollywood Eigashi Kōgi (1993)
- Zettai Bungei Jihyō Sengen (1994)
- Tamashii no Yuibutsuronteki na Yōgo no Tame ni (1994)
- Opera Opérationnelle (1994)
- Watakushi ga Daigaku ni Tsuite Shitteiru Ni San no Kotogara (2001)
- Supōtsu Hihyō Sengen (2004)
- Eiga e no Fujitsunaru Sasoi (2004)
- Miserarete: Sakka Ronshū (2005)
- Godāru Kakumei (2005)
- Hyōshō no Naraku (2006)
- Aka no Yūwaku (2007)
- Eiga Hōkai Zenya (2008)
- Eigaron Kōgi (2008)
- Godāru Mane Fūkō (2008)
- Zuisō (2010)
- Eiga Jihyō 2009-2011 (2012)

Academic offices
| Preceded by Hiroyuki Yoshikawa | President of University of Tokyo; April 1997 – March 2001 | Succeeded by Takeshi Sasaki |
