= Kandagawa Pervert Wars =

1983 film by Kiyoshi Kurosawa

- Korean film poster
- Directed by: Kiyoshi Kurosawa
- Written by: Kiyoshi Kurosawa
- Starring: Usagi Aso
- Edited by: Junichi Kikuchi
- Production company: Director's Company
- Distributed by: Million Film
- Release date: August 1983
- Running time: 60 minutes
- Country: Japan
- Language: Japanese

Kandagawa Pervert Wars (Japanese: 神田川淫乱戦争, Hepburn: Kandagawa Inran Sensō) is a 1983 Japanese pink film directed by Kiyoshi Kurosawa, who would later go on to a career directing mainstream horror films.

== Synopsis ==
A young girl, Akiko, in a tenement block in Tokyo's Kandagawa area, uses a telescope to spy on her neighbors in between sex sessions with her boyfriend. When she discovers what seems to be an incestuous relationship between a mother and son, she decides, with her friend Masami, to rescue the son from this predicament and introduce him to a "healthy sex life".

== Cast ==
- Usagi Asō (麻生うさぎ) as Akiko
- Makoto Yoshino / Makoto Mino (美野美琴) as Masami
- Houen Kishino (岸野萌圓) as the Son
- Miiko Sawaki / Mimi Sawaki (沢木美伊子) as the Mother
- Tatsuya Mori as Ryō (Akiko's Boyfriend)
- Masayuki Suo as the Apartment Manager

== Background ==
Kiyoshi Kurosawa was one of a number of young Japanese filmmakers, several associated with Nikkatsu, who belonged to a production organization called the Director's Company which had been founded in 1982. Through the influence of fellow Director's Company member Banmei Takahashi, Kiyoshi was offered a chance to direct a pink film for Million Film. This film became Kandagawa Pervert Wars with its references to Alfred Hitchcock's Rear Window, inventive directorial devices, playful mannerisms and in-joke allusions to Kurosawa's favorite western films. Jasper Sharp suggests that the studio was less than delighted with the result and Million shelved his second pink film effort College Girl: Shameful Seminar as not sexy enough. Kurosawa was able to buy the footage and reworked it into the 1985 non-pink film The Excitement of the Do-Re-Mi-Fa Girl.

The cast and staff of Kandagawa Pervert Wars present a kaleidoscope of figures who would become an important part of filmmaking in Japan in the 1990s and later. These include Assistant Director Toshiyuki Mizutani, Second Assistant Director Masayuki Suo who also had a minor role in the film, Third Assistant Director Akihiko Shiota, and actor Tatsuya Mori.

== Release ==
Kandagawa Pervert Wars was released theatrically in Japan in August 1983 by Million Film and published as a DVD on April 26, 2004, by AceDeuce (販売元:エースデュース).

== Reception ==
Thomas and Yuko Mihara Weisser praised the "witty dialogue and very likable characters" and gave the film a 3 star rating (out of four).
