= Godzilla vs. Mechagodzilla =

1974 film by Jun Fukuda

- Theatrical release poster

Japanese name
- Kanji: ゴジラ対メカゴジラ
Transcriptions
- Revised Hepburn: gojira tai mekagojira
- Directed by: Jun Fukuda
- Screenplay by: Hiroyasu Yamamura; Jun Fukuda
- Story by: Shinichi Sekizawa; Masami Fukushima
- Produced by: Tomoyuki Tanaka
- Starring: Masaaki Daimon; Kazuya Aoyama; Akihiko Hirata; Hiroshi Koizumi
- Cinematography: Yuzuru Aizawa
- Edited by: Michiko Ikeda
- Music by: Masaru Sato
- Production company: Toho–Eizo
- Distributed by: Toho
- Release date: March 21, 1974 (Japan)
- Running time: 84 minutes
- Country: Japan
- Language: Japanese
- Budget: ¥100 million (est.) (Note: According to the film's special effects assistant director Kōichi Kawakita, its budget was roughly the same as that of Godzilla vs. Hedorah (1971). That film was budgeted at ¥100 million.)
- Box office: $17 million (overseas)

Godzilla vs. Mechagodzilla (ゴジラ対メカゴジラ, Gojira tai Mekagojira) is a 1974 Japanese kaiju film directed by Jun Fukuda, with special effects by Teruyoshi Nakano. Distributed by Toho and produced under their effects subsidiary Toho–Eizo, it is the 14th film of the Godzilla franchise. The film stars Masaaki Daimon, Kazuya Aoyama, Gorō Mutsumi, and Akihiko Hirata, with Isao Zushi as Godzilla, Satoru Kuzumi as both Anguirus and King Caesar, and Kazunari Mori as Mechagodzilla.

Godzilla vs. Mechagodzilla was released theatrically in Japan on March 21, 1974, to generally positive reviews. The film received a limited release in the United States in 1977 by Cinema Shares, under the title Godzilla vs. the Bionic Monster. It was then quickly re-released under the title Godzilla vs. the Cosmic Monster which was also the UK theatrical title.

The film was followed by Terror of Mechagodzilla, released on March 15, 1975.

== Plot ==
In Okinawa, an Azumi priestess has a vision of a city being destroyed by a giant monster. Masahiko Shimizu discovers space titanium while spelunking and takes it to Professor Miyajima for examination. An excavation led by Masahiko's brother Keisuke uncovers a chamber filled with ancient artifacts and a mural bearing an ominous prophecy: "When a black mountain appears above the clouds, a huge monster will arise and try to destroy the world; but when the red moon sets and the sun rises in the west, two monsters shall appear to save the people." Keisuke is joined by archaeologist Saeko Kaneshiro, who translates the prophecy and takes a statue bearing the likeness of Okinawa's guardian monster King Caesar to study. Two men stalk them, one claiming to be a reporter while the other attempts to steal the statue.

Following the appearance of a black cloud resembling a mountain, a Godzilla imposter emerges from Mount Fuji and begins a destructive rampage. Godzilla's ally, Anguirus, confronts the imposter, only to be injured and forced to retreat. Keisuke arrives shortly after to check on Masahiko and Miyajima. As the Godzilla imposter's rampage continues, the real Godzilla confronts the imposter, revealed to be Mechagodzilla, a massive mecha with advanced weaponry made of space titanium. Both monsters injure each other and retreat.

Keisuke and Saeko take the statue back to the temple, but are confronted by the thief once again. During the fight, the skin on half of the stranger's face melts away, revealing an ape-like alien from the Third Planet of the Black Hole called Simeon. The Simeon intruder attempts to kill Keisuke, but an unseen gunman kills him before Keisuke and Saeko catch a brief glimpse of the reporter. Godzilla arrives on Monster Island during a thunderstorm and is struck by lightning multiple times, reinvigorating it.

Masahiko, Miyajima and his daughter Ikuko explore the cave where the space titanium was found, but are captured by Simeons, who plan to use Mechagodzilla to conquer Earth. Their commander, Kuronuma, forces Miyajima to repair the mecha. While Saeko checks into a hotel and guards the statue, Keisuke leaves to meet Masahiko at the caves, only to encounter the reporter, who reveals himself as Nanbara, an Interpol agent who has been tracking the Simeons. After Nanbara and Keisuke infiltrate Simeon base and free the prisoners, Keisuke and Ikuko leave to pick up Saeko and the statue while Miyajima, Nanbara, and Masahiko stay behind, only to be recaptured by Kuronuma.

The next morning, a lunar eclipse results in a red moon and a mirage of the sun rising in the west. Seeing this, the team realizes they have to awaken Caesar. They meet with the priestess and her grandfather and place the statue in the temple, revealing Caesar's resting place. As Kuronuma dispatches Mechagodzilla, the priestess sings to awaken Caesar and Godzilla arrives. The two monsters join forces to fight Mechagodzilla. When the mecha tries to escape, Godzilla creates an electromagnetic field to attract Mechagodzilla before tearing off its head, destroying Mechagodzilla. While the Simeons are distracted, Nanbara and the others free themselves, kill their captors, and sabotage the base, fleeing as it explodes. With the enemy defeated, Godzilla heads out to the ocean and Caesar returns to its resting place while the humans rejoice.

== Cast ==
- Masaaki Daimon as Keisuke Shimizu (清水 敬介, Shimizu Keisuke)
- Kazuya Aoyama as Masahiko Shimizu (清水 正彦, Shimizu Masahiko)
- Akihiko Hirata as Professor Hideto Miyajima (宮島 秀人, Miyajima Hideto)
- Hiroshi Koizumi as Professor Wagura (和倉 博士, Wagura-hakase)
- Reiko Tajima as Saeko Kanagusuku (金城 冴子, Kanagusuku Saeko)
- Hiromi Matsushita as Ikuko Miyajima (宮島 郁子, Miyajima Ikuko)
- Gorō Mutsumi as Kuronuma, Black Hole Alien Commander
- Shin Kishida as Nanbara, Interpol Agent
- Takayasu Torii as Tamura, Interpol Agent
- Beru-Bera Lin as Princess Nami, Azumi
- Masao Imafuku as High Priest Azumi
- Daigo Kusano as Yanagawa, Alien Agent #1
- Kenji Sahara as Ship Captain
- Isao Zushi as Godzilla
- Kazunari Mori as Mechagodzilla
- Kin'ichi Kusumi as Anguirus and King Caesar

== Production ==
=== Development and writing ===
Produced to commemorate the 20th anniversary of the Godzilla film series, the film went through several conceptual phases during pre-production. An early draft of the film by Shinichi Sekizawa and Masami Fukushima, titled "Giant Monsters Coverage on Okinawa! Showdown in Zampamisaki", featured Godzilla, Anguirus, and Mothra teaming up to battle an alien monster named Garugan, controlled by the "Gargua Aliens".

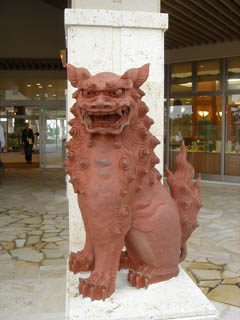
A shisa, which the character King Caesar is based on

The draft was ultimetely scrapped and reworked by director Jun Fukuda and screenwriter Hiroyasu Yamamura. The Gargua Aliens were replaced with the Black Hole Planet 3 Aliens, and Garguan was replaced with Mechagodzilla. Mothra was also scrapped, replaced by a new guardian monster initially named "King Barukan", before being redesigned and renamed to King Caesar. The character of King Caesar was based on an Okinawan tale about a shisa protecting a village from a dragon.

=== Creature design ===
As with all previous entries in the Godzilla film series, the kaiju characters featured in Godzilla vs. Mechagodzilla were depicted through suitmation. The body of the Mechagodzilla suit, worn by suit actor Kazunari Mori, was made from a polyethylene material, while the suit's head and hands were made using fibre-reinforced plastic.

== Release ==
Cinema Shares' theatrical posters for the 1977 U.S release of the film. The film changed titles while in theaters from Godzilla vs. the Bionic Monster to Godzilla vs. the Cosmic Monster.

Godzilla vs. Mechagodzilla was released in Japan on March 21, 1974, where it was distributed by Toho.

The film was released in the United States in March 1977. It was released by Cinema Shares in the United States under the title Godzilla vs. the Bionic Monster where the film was shown predominantly at Saturday "kiddie" matinees. The Cinema Shares theatrical version deleted four minutes of credits, profanity and blood-letting from the film. Universal Television threatened to sue Cinema Shares over the use of the name "Bionic" in the film's title, as they owned the rights to The Six Million Dollar Man and The Bionic Woman TV series. The film title was quickly changed to Godzilla vs. the Cosmic Monster, which was also used for the 1977 U.K. theatrical release.

=== Box office ===
The film made slightly more money than Godzilla vs. Megalon, but was still not making as big a box office profit as the other films in the Godzilla series had in the early 1960s. The 1974 Japanese release earned a distribution income (rentals) of ¥370 million. It also grossed $17.1 million overseas.

=== Home video ===
In 1988, New World Video restored the film on home video, using a complete and unedited print titled Godzilla vs. Mechagodzilla. Columbia TriStar Home Entertainment released an HD remaster of the film on DVD on October 19, 2004, with both English and Japanese audio included. In 2019, both the Japanese version and export English version were included in a Blu-ray box set released by the Criterion Collection, which included all 15 films from the franchise's Shōwa era. In 2025, a 4K remaster of the film was released on 4K Blu-ray and remastered Blu-ray in Japan; it was bundled with other Godzilla films in a 70th anniversary box set.

=== Reception ===
In a contemporary review in the Monthly Film Bulletin, Tony Rayns stated that at this point in the Godzilla series, there was no way the film "could have been anything other than formulary, but it could clearly have been much less shambling than it is." Rayns noted that Shinichi Sekizawa's story was "for once, quite ambitious" while noting that the film's "'mythic' elements are never coherent or impressive enough to match the array of alien technology, and the script seems to forget all about fulfilling its own prophecies as it hurries towards the regulation free-style wrestling climax."

From retrospective reviews, Stuart Galbraith IV discussed the film in his book on Japanese genre films. Galbraith described the film as a "complete mess", finding that the aliens in the film were a rip-off of Planet of the Apes and that the film had poor effects work and "equally poor direction of Jun Fukuda." Galbraith opined that the film was "an improvement over Godzilla vs. Megalon, but that's not saying much." Among the positive attributes, Galbraith noted that Masaru Sato's score was interesting and series veterans Akihiko Hirata, Hiroshi Koizumi and Kenji Sahara "make welcome appearances." In Phil Hardy's book Science Fiction (1984), a review stated that "the final fight is suitably impressive although the tongue-in-cheek reference to Leone slows the action down too much."

On Rotten Tomatoes, the film has an approval rating of 86% based on 7 reviews, with a rating average of 6.3/10."

== See also ==
- List of Japanese films of 1974
- List of science fiction films of the 1970s

== Bibliography ==
- Galbraith IV, Stuart (1994). Japanese Science Fiction, Fantasy and Horror Films. McFarland. ISBN 0899508537.
- Hardy, Phil, ed. (1984). Science Fiction. New York : Morrow. ISBN 0688008429.
- Kalat, David (2007). A Critical History and Filmography of Toho's Godzilla Series. McFarland. ISBN 9780786430994.
- Ryfle, Steve (1998). Japan's Favorite Mon-Star: The Unauthorized Biography of the Big G. ECW Press. ISBN 1550223488.
