= Scarlet Prostitute: Stabbing =

1981 Japanese film

- Theatrical poster for Scarlet Prostitute: Stabbing (1981)
- Directed by: Genji Nakamura
- Written by: Nanae Shimada
- Starring: Yuka Asagiri; Atsushi Imaizumi; Maria Satsuki
- Distributed by: Million Film
- Release date: March 1981
- Running time: 61 minutes
- Country: Japan
- Language: Japanese

Scarlet Prostitute: Stabbing (赤い娼婦 突き刺す, Akai Shōfu: Tsukisasu) is a 1981 Japanese pink film directed by Genji Nakamura. Considered one of the most important pink film makers of the 1980s, this is judged to be one of Nakamura's best films as an independent director. Nakamura later made films in Nikkatsu's Roman Porno series, and then directed some of the earliest major gay-themed pink films for ENK.

== Synopsis ==
A gang boss orders the execution of a prostitute who witnessed a murder. When the boss' henchman discovers the prostitute is actually blind, he falls in love with her and protects her. The prostitute regains her sight just in time to see the death of her boyfriend. At his funeral, overcome with feelings of mixed joy and grief, she secretly masturbates.

== Cast ==
- Yuka Asagiri (朝霧友香)
- Maria Satsuki (五月マリア)
- Rima Aono (青野梨魔)
- Atsushi Imaizumi (今泉厚)
- Ren Aosugi (大杉漣)
- Kenji Uchimura (内村健治)
- Yōichi Iijima (飯島洋一)
- Tarō Iwate (岩手太郎)

== Critical appraisal ==
In their Japanese Cinema Encyclopedia: The Sex Films, Thomas and Yuko Mihara Weisser give Scarlet Prostitute: Stabbing a rating of three and-a-half out of four stars, writing that director Genji Nakamura handles the far-fetched plot in a skillful way, evoking strong emotions out of the material. According to the Weissers, Nakamura's direction gives the film a "high-level tension punctuated by intricately drawn characters". The depiction of the blind prostitute's daily life is judged to be particularly effective. The final scene in which the prostitute masturbates at her boyfriend's funeral is singled out as especially moving. Though this was a controversial scene at the time of the film's release, the Weissers write that it has "an erotic yet melancholy effect on the audience. Even the most calloused viewer will become misty-eyed."

== Bibliography ==
=== English ===
- Akai shoufu: tsukisasu (1981) at IMDb
- "AKAI SHOFU: TSUKISEI". Complete Index to World Film.
- Weisser, Thomas; Yuko Mihara Weisser (1998). Japanese Cinema Encyclopedia: The Sex Films. Miami: Vital Books : Asian Cult Cinema Publications. ISBN 1-889288-52-7.

=== Japanese ===
- 赤い娼婦 突き刺す (in Japanese). Japanese Movie Database.
- 赤い娼婦 突き刺す (in Japanese). Japanese Cinema Database (Agency for Cultural Affairs).
