= Million Film =

Japanese pink film studio

- Industry: Pornography
- Founded: 1969
- Defunct: 1988
- Headquarters: Tokyo, Japan
- Products: Pink films
- Parent: Keitsū Productions; Humax Group
- Subsidiaries: Joypack Film

Million Film (ミリオンフィルム) was one of the early independent studios which produced pink films. Along with OP Eiga, Shintōhō Eiga, Kantō and Kōji Wakamatsu's production studio, Million Film was one of the most influential on the genre during its first decade. Many of the most prominent directors and performers in the pink film genre worked for Million Film.

== Million's beginning ==
Million Films was a subsidiary of Keitsū Productions, which ran a string of cinemas during the post-war years, including the Shinjuku Moulin Rouge, which Keitsū revived and ran as a movie theater beginning in April 1947. Late in 1968, Million began distributing films for other production companies, beginning with pink film pioneer Kan Mukai's Cruel Story of a Sex Film Actress (セックス女優残酷史, Sex Joyū Zankokushi) in September.

In its first year of existence, Million Film distributed films starring some of the leading performers in the pink film industry. Sex Drive (セックスドライブ), produced by Unimonde and released by Million in October 1968, gave future Nikkatsu Roman Porno queen Kazuko Shirakawa a role as one of lead actor Masayoshi Nogami's sex partners. Unusual for Nogami, who specialized in roles as rapists, Shirakawa's character is a willing participant. Produced by Yamabe Pro and released by Million in November 1968, director Jirō Matsubara's Orgy of Flesh or Bewitching of the Flesh (肉の競艶, Niku no Kyōen) was notable for teaming two of the most popular pink film actresses of the day, Naomi Tani and Mari Iwai.

While continuing to distribute films from other production companies, in 1969, the year in which the production company was founded, Million Film began producing films for Keitsū's theater chain. During the boom years of the pink film industry, in the mid- to late-1960s, dozens of small studios produced pink films. The major studios, including Toei, and especially Nikkatsu took over the sexploitation film in the early 1970s. This was a period of weeding-out of smaller independent studios, leaving only a few major pink studios. Along with Shintōhō Eiga and Ōkura Eiga (OP Eiga), Million was one of the few independent studios to survive this era.

== 1970s ==
Among the prominent pink filmmakers who worked at Million were prolific director Kin'ya Ogawa. In 1970, Ogawa came to Million from Ōkura Eiga, and after a short stay at Million, moved on to Shintōhō Eiga. Prominent female pink film director, Sachi Hamano shot her debut film at Million Film in 1971. Titled 17-Year-Old Free Love Tribe (十七才すきすき族, Jūnana-sai Sukisukizoku), Million released the film in September 1972.

Under his pseudonym Yoshikazu Kishimoto (岸本恵一, Kishimoto Yoshikazu), Sōjirō Motoki began directing films at Million with Sex No. 1 (セックスＮｏ．１) (December 1971), starring future Nikkatsu Roman Porno queen Junko Miyashita. Motoki's ties to the pink film went back to 1962, the year of the production of the first film in that genre. Motoki's Free Trade in Flesh (肉体自由貿易, Nikutai Jiyū Bōeki) was one of only four pink films made in 1962. Previous to his career in sex films, Motoki had been a producer at Toho where he was behind such major films as Akira Kurosawa's Ikiru (1952) and Seven Samurai (1954). Motoki continued directing for Million Film until his last film, Sensual College Girl: I Want to Give It to You! (好色女子大生 あげちゃいたい！, Kōshoku Joshi Daisei: Agechaitai!) (June 1977).

The year 1970 also encapsulated the brief pink film career of science fiction author Izumi Suzuki, who made a number of films with Million under the stage name Naomi Asaka, including A Virgin at Play (処女の戯れ), White Paper on the Violation of Prostitutes: Sexual Violence (売春暴行白書・性暴力を斬る), and A Woman's Sexual Development (女性の性徴期).

The survival rate of early independent pink films is very low, but the DVD company Ace Deuce Entertainment has preserved several early Million Film releases and made them available on home video. Yokohama Cheyenne: Woman Swamp Zone (横浜シャイアン 女の湿地帯, Yokohama Shaian: Onna no Shicchi-tai) and New Bride: Mixed Up Figure (新妻 乱れ姿, Niizuma: Midaresugata) (both 1974) are significant both for being examples of surviving early pink films from an independent studio other than Shintōhō Eiga. These are also among the earliest surviving all-color pink film productions. Both these films were produced by Akitaka Kimata's Pro Taka production studio and directed by his son Akiyoshi Kimata under the pseudonym Seiji Izumi (和泉聖治, Izumi Seiji). Both films show a light-hearted and easy-going style which contrasts with the darker style of the director and of Million Film productions in later years. The non-political nature of these two films contrasts with the politically charged pink films of the 1960s, such as those by Kōji Wakamatsu, which often tackled current events. Woman Crime Demon (女犯魔, Johan-ma) made by Genji Nakamura for his own Genji Pro, and released by Million in October 1977 shows a similarly relaxed style, though it does make reference to the political themes of earlier pink film, particularly the Anpo.

Beginning in 1976, Million distributed yō pin, or "Western pink" film, Western films in the sexploitation genre such as those directed by Russ Meyer and Jesús Franco. Million continued this distribution of foreign films in Japan until the mid-1980s through a subsidiary called Joypack Film. Million's parent company, Keitsū had built the Shinjuku Joypack Building Annex in July 1976. In 1978 Keitsū established Joypack Amusement, and in July 1979 Joypack Leisure, which included Joypack Amusement and two other companies. Joypack Leisure was involved with aspects of entertainment outside of film.

== 1980s ==
Million Film hosted some of the most important pink filmmakers during the early 1980s, and distributed some of the most significant independent pink films made during this era, though the company ceased production in 1986, and withdrew from pink film distribution in 1988. Known as one of the "Three Pillars of Pink", several of Genji Nakamura's most important films were distributed by Million Film during the early 1980s. After working on more than fifty films, Wet Lips: Sleek and Hot (濡れた唇 しなやかに熱く, Nureta Kuchibiru: Shinayaka ni Atsuku) (April 1980) was Nakamura's breakthrough as a personal statement, and as his first award-winning film. Another highly regarded Nakamura film released by Million, Scarlet Prostitute: Stabbing (1981), concludes with a controversial, yet poignant scene which, Thomas and Yuko Mihara Weisser write in their Japanese Cinema Encyclopedia: The Sex Films, will leave, "[e]ven the most calloused viewer... misty-eyed".

One of the earliest significant female pink film directors, Rumi Tama made her directorial debut for Million Film with the November 1981 release, Revenge Sex: Girl Rape (復讐セックス 女が犯す, Fukushū Sekkusu: Onna ga Okasu). Many of Tama's earlier films as an actress—often produced and directed by her husband Akitaka Kimata, or his son, Seiji Izumi—had also been released by Million.

Another of the "Three Pillars of Pink", Banmei Takahashi's November 1981 Million Film release, Attacked Woman (襲られた女, Yarareta Onna) won several awards and was named by the mainstream Kinema Jumpo as one of the best films of 1981. Though Takahashi is considered one of the most prominent pink filmmakers of this era, and many critics regard Attacked Woman as his best pink film, the Weissers reported in 1998 that Million Film had declared Attacked Woman a lost film. All prints had been either lost or destroyed, though a 7-minute clip was rediscovered in the late 1980s. However, the film became available on DVD through the Ace-Deuce site in April 2002. Takahashi introduced the noted horror-film director Kiyoshi Kurosawa to Million Film at the start of his career. Though he had a short and troubled relationship with the studio, and eventually only made one pink film, Kurosawa made his debut with Million. Million agreed to produce Kurosawa's project Kandagawa Pervert Wars (神田川淫乱戦争, Kandagawa Inran Sensō), which was released August 1983. Jasper Sharp writes that Kurosawa's script resembles a pink film tribute to Jean-Luc Godard as filtered through Rear Window (1954). Sharp writes that the combination of Kurosawa's film scholar sensibilities, and the low budget afforded him to film his scenario no doubt appeared as sarcasm to the studio. Nevertheless, Million Film gave Kurosawa a second chance to direct, with his script College Girl: Shameful Seminar. However, after seeing what Kurosawa had filmed, they canceled the project, proclaiming it not sufficiently erotic. Kurosawa later bought back the footage to use it in his mainstream film, The Excitement of the Do-Re-Mi-Fa Girl (1985). After his experience with Million, Kurosawa left the pink film genre behind, finding success in the yakuza and horror fields.

Million Film's parent company, Keitsū's film distribution subsidiary was broken off from Million and named Joypack Cinema in 1983. In 1984, the Japanese Prosecutor's Office decided to enforce the Moral Sensibility law more strictly, targeting pink film theaters, their advertising, and the studios. Hoping to prevent drastic actions, representatives of the pink film studios met with Eirin, the police and the prosecutor's office. The result of this meeting, known as "the Ice Age summit", was that the studios agreed to a set of conditions in exchange for a promise of leniency from the authorities. The conditions included the banning of 184 words—such as those implying underage performers, or graphic words such as "rape", "lick", etc.-- in film titles, and the banning of nudity, or two bodies touching affectionately, in poster graphics. The result of the studios' compliance with these new rules was disastrous for the pink film industry, with box-office attendance dropping 36% in the first month of their implementation.

Actress Kiyomi Itō debuted at Million, in director Ryūji Akitsu's April 1984 release, High School Girl: Thrill of the Chase (女高生猟色, Jokōsei: Ryōshoku). Itō went on to become controversial director Hisayasu Satō's favorite leading actress after working in his debut film, Mad Love! Lolita Poaching (激愛！ロリータ密猟, Gekiai! Roriita Mitsuryō). She appeared in Satō's October 1986 release for Million, Exciting Eros: Hot Skin (エキサイティング・エロ 熱い肌, Exciting Ero: Atsū Hada), and in some of his most notorious works, including Lolita: Vibrator Torture (1987) and Widow's Perverted Hell (1991).

In January 1984, Million produced Molester's Train: Insert Deeply (痴漢電車奥まで入れて, Chikan Densha: Oku Made Irete), a film linked to Shintōhō Eiga's popular and long-running "Molester's Train" series. Gō Ijūin (伊集院剛) is a pseudonym used by various filmmakers working individually and together at Genji Nakamura's production studio. Director Ryūichi Hiroki made the first Gō Ijūin film, The SM, in 1984 and it was distributed by Million Film. Hiroki began a successful mainstream career in the late 1980s.

Million Film served as the distributor of the debut works of significant filmmakers even in its last years in production. Bizarre Experience: Dreamy (猟奇体験 夢性, Ryōki Taiken: Musei), released in September 1985, was a pink science-fiction fantasy which provided director Tsutomu Watanabe with his career debut. Watanabe found greater success in horror and fantasy cinema. Hidekazu Takahara, today best known for his musical comedies, made his career debut at Million with the November 1985 release, Sexy Up: Pink Nipple (セクシーアップ 桃色乳首, Sexy Up: Momoiro Chikubi).

Million Film ceased production in 1986. The closing of the studio's production facilities resulted in the stalling of the debut of prominent "Four Heavenly Kings of Pink" (ピンク四天王, pinku shitenno) director Toshiki Satō for two years. Originally scheduled to make a film for Million in 1986, Satō did not make his first film until 1988, for Nikkatsu Video. Keitsū's film exhibition arm, Joypack Cinema, was renamed Humax in 1987. Million Film stopped distributing pink films in 1988. In 1989 the Humax Group was formed. The Humax Group currently includes Joypack Cinema which produces and distributes non-pink films, and runs several theaters in Tokyo.

== Personnel and output ==
=== Directors ===
Notable directors whose films were produced or released by Million Film include:

- Sachi Hamano
- Ryūichi Hiroki
- Kazuyuki Izutsu
- Akiyoshi Kimata
- Kiyoshi Kurosawa
- Sōjirō Motoki

- Kan Mukai
- Genji Nakamura
- Kin'ya Ogawa
- Hisayasu Satō
- Hidekazu Takahara
- Banmei Takahashi

- Ario Takeda
- Rumi Tama
- Tadashi Yoyogi
- Mamoru Watanabe
- Tsutomu Watanabe
- Shin'ya Yamamoto (director)

=== Actors and actresses ===
Notable actors and actresses who performed at Million Film include:

- Yutaka Ikejima
- Kiyomi Itō
- Mari Iwai

- Shirō Shimomoto
- Kazuko Shirakawa

- Rumi Tama
- Naomi Tani

=== Films ===
Notable films produced and/or released by Million Film include:

- Yokohama Cheyenne: Woman Swamp Zone (横浜シャイアン 女の湿地帯, Yokohama Shaian: Onna no Shicchi-tai) (Akiyoshi Kimata as Seiji Izumi, 1974)
- New Bride: Mixed Up Figure (新妻 乱れ姿, Niizuma: Midaresugata) (Akiyoshi Kimata as Seiji Izumi, 1974)
- Wet Lips: Sleek and Hot (濡れた唇 しなやかに熱く, Nureta Kuchibiru: Shinayaka ni Atsuku) (Genji Nakamura, 1980)
- Attacked Woman (襲られた女, Yarareta Onna) (Banmei Takahashi, 1981)
- Scarlet Prostitute: Stabbing (Genji Nakamura, 1981)
- Kandagawa Pervert Wars (Kiyoshi Kurosawa, 1983)
- The SM (Ryūichi Hiroki as Gō Ijūin, 1984)

== Bibliography ==
=== English ===
- Cowie, Peter, ed. (1977). "Japan". World Filmography 1968. London: Tantivy Press. ISBN 0-904208-36-2.
- Sharp, Jasper (2008). Behind the Pink Curtain: The Complete History of Japanese Sex Cinema. Guildford: FAB Press. ISBN 978-1-903254-54-7.
- Weisser, Thomas; Yuko Mihara Weisser (1998). Japanese Cinema Encyclopedia: The Sex Films. Miami: Vital Books : Asian Cult Cinema Publications. ISBN 1-889288-52-7.

=== Japanese ===
- "Japanese Cinema Database". Agency for Cultural Affairs.
- "Japanese Movie Database" (in Japanese). Japanese Movie Database.
