= Redman (TV series) =

- The superhero Redman battles the Ultraman monster Jirahs. Many of Redman's foes were from Ultraman
- Genre: Tokusatsu; Kyodai Hero; Kaiju
- Created by: Tsuburaya Productions
- Directed by: Tatsumi Andō
- Starring: Kin'ichi Kusumi
- Composer: Takeo Yamashita
- Country of origin: Japan
- No. of episodes: 138

Production
- Producer: Tsunehiko Kondo
- Running time: 5 minutes

Original release
- Network: Nippon TV (Japan)
- Release: April 3 – September 8, 1972

Redman (レッドマン, Reddoman) is a Japanese tokusatsu television series. A Kyodai Hero programme, featuring the titular hero growing to immense size and fighting similarly sized monsters. Originally broadcast as 138 five-minute segments as part of the children's variety show Ohayo! Kodomo Show on Nippon TV, it was produced by Tsuburaya Productions. Redman was initially aired between April 3, 1972, to September 8 of that same year. In 2016, Tsuburaya Productions uploaded the series to its official YouTube channel.

It is similar in many ways to Tsuburaya Productions' other Kyodai Hero programmes, particularly the Ultra Series, with all of Redman's foes being reused Ultra Series monsters. The titular hero, described as a peace-loving alien from Planet Red in the Red Nebula, has a reputation among fans for the level of aggression he displays in fights, earning the fan nickname of Red Phantom Killer (赤い通り魔, Akai Tōrima). Redman's original premise, similar to that of various other Tsuburaya Kyodai Heroes, is that he is an incorporeal alien being who, upon escaping the destruction of Planet Red, bonds with Officer Sakomizu of the Scientific Investigation Agency (SIA) and must protect Earth from evil spirits that are able to revive fallen monsters from the dead. Redman's signature moves include Redarrow, Redjump, Redkick, Redknife, and Redfall.

Most of the filming took place in the Ukuta development area in Kawasaki, a 30-minute drive from Tsuburaya Productions' main office due to the fast paced production schedule. Some filming was conducted at Tajiri Beach in Onjuka, Chiba Prefecture.

== Comic book ==
A comic series titled Redman: The Kaiju Hunter, written and illustrated by Matt Frank and Gonçalo Lopes, began in Japan in November 2017. An English-language trade paperback collecting chapters 1-5 was published by Night Shining, Inc. in August 2018. The second volume, collecting chapters 6-10, was published in February 2019. The third volume, collecting chapters 11-15, was published in April 2020. The comic series adheres to the popular fan interpretation of Redman as an aggressive killer, featuring the titular hero wandering a desolate world populated by monsters and framed as a television show controlled and narrated by a mysterious entity. The comic also features the "Monster of Justice" Bemdora (ベンドラ) , who is based on one of the early concepts for what would eventually become Ultraman known as Scientific Special Search Party: Bemular (科学特捜隊ベムラー, Kagaku Tokusō Tai - Bemurā)
