= Shigeomi Hasumi =

Japanese-Belgian composer

Shigeomi Hasumi 蓮実重臣
- Shigeomi Hasumi

Background information
- Also known as: Glenn Miyashiro
- Born: December 7, 1967; Tokyo, Japan
- Died: June 18, 2017 (aged 49)
- Occupations: Composer, arranger, musician
- Years active: 1995–2017
- Education: Tokyo University of Foreign Studies
- Parents: Shigehiko Hasumi (father); Chantal Van Melkebeke (mother)

Shigeomi Hasumi (蓮実重臣, Hasumi Shigeomi) (7 December 1967 – 18 June 2017) was a Japanese composer, arranger and musician. He also used the alias Glenn Miyashiro. He graduated from Tokyo University of Foreign Studies, Faculty of Foreign Studies, Department of Mongolian Studies.

He was the grandson of Shigeyasu Hasumi, a historian of Japanese art. His father, Shigehiko Hasumi, a French literature scholar, literary and film critic, was a professor at the University of Tokyo and the 26th President (1997-2001). His mother was Chantal Van Melkebeke, a French-speaking Belgian.

== Life and work ==
He was born on 7 December 1967 in Tokyo, Japan, to a Japanese father, Shigehiko Hasumi, and a Belgian mother, Chantal Van Melkebeke, whose native language was French. His father's book Han Nihongo Ron (1977) describes an episode about Shigeomi's life, who grew up to be bilingual when he was a child. In 1970, the French Broadcasting and Television Office interviewed him and his parents in French for 20 minutes.

While in high school, he joined Keihin Kyodaisha, a musician group consisting of Yuichi Kishino, Midori Okamura, Hibiki Tokiwa, and Yu Yamaguchi.

In 1995, he made his debut with the electronic light music unit PACIFIC 231 formed with Takemasa Miyake, and in 1998 released the album MIYASHIRO. Their song "SORA NO KOTOZUTE" was covered by Hei Tanaka in 2017. He was also active in the fields of film music, anime music, and TV ad music.

In 2003 he composed the music score for the drama film Bright Future. In 2009, he won the 64th Mainichi Film Award for Best Music for the music for the movie I'm a Cat Stalker (Japanese: 私は猫ストーカー).

He died of colon cancer on 18 June 2017 at the age of 49.

== Awards ==
| Year | Award | Category | Project | Result | Ref. |
|---|---|---|---|---|---|
| 2009 | Mainichi Film Awards | Best Music | I'm a Cat Stalker | Won | |
