= Serpent's Path (1998 film) =

- DVD cover
- 蛇の道
- Directed by: Kiyoshi Kurosawa
- Written by: Hiroshi Takahashi
- Produced by: Atsuyuki Shimoda; Tsutomu Tsuchikawa
- Starring: Show Aikawa; Teruyuki Kagawa
- Cinematography: Masaki Tamura
- Edited by: Kan Suzuki
- Music by: Hikaru Yoshida
- Production company: Daiei Film
- Release date: 21 February 1998 (Japan)
- Running time: 85 minutes
- Country: Japan
- Language: Japanese

Serpent's Path (Japanese: 蛇の道, Hepburn: Hebi no michi) is a 1998 Japanese crime thriller film directed by Kiyoshi Kurosawa, and written by Hiroshi Takahashi. It follows the story of two men who engage in kidnapping and torture in order to discover the identity of a child murderer. The film stars Show Aikawa as Nijima, a calm professional, and Teruyuki Kagawa as Miyashita, a grieving ex-yakuza. Positioned by Kurosawa as a continuation of his V-Cinema productions, the production company Daiei ensured that it had a theatrical release. The film has since become a cult classic. A 2024 remake written and directed by Kurosawa uses the same premise but is set in France.

== Plot ==
Arriving at an abandoned warehouse on the edge of town, two men drag a man from the boot of their car and chain him to a wall in the warehouse. A former low-level yakuza member named Miyashita has enlisted his friend Nijima (a schoolteacher) to track down the person who kidnapped and murdered his daughter. Miyashita watches home video footage of his daughter obsessively as the two of them torture the man they have captive. Upon finding out that he is not the killer, he confesses that more people were involved in the plot, leading the two of them deeper down the path of revenge.

== Cast ==
- Show Aikawa as Nijima
- Teruyuki Kagawa as Miyashita
- Yûrei Yanagi as Hiyama
- Shirō Shimomoto as Otsuki
- Kaiei Okina as Ariga
- Kaoru Sunada as Otsuki's mistress
- Takumi Tanji as Girl's younger brother
- Hana Sato as Math class student
- Satoshi Morihiro as Okabayashi
- Ayami Oda as Emi
- Mizuho Tanaka as Nijima's daughter
- Kazutaka Niyama as Hiyama's Underling
- Yoshitaka Kowashi as Hiyama's Underling
- Hideo Usui as Hiyama's Underling
- Takeshi Ôshima as Hiyama's Underling

== Production ==
Around the time of the film's creation, Kurosawa was in the middle of an extremely productive period. Between 1996 and 1998 he produced eleven different films, two of them (Cure and License to Live) released theatrically. He received an offer to make two films in two weeks on a very low budget; the second of these was Eyes of the Spider, a more light-hearted take on the genre. Both feature Show Aikawa as a character named Nijima.

== Release ==
The film was released in Japan on 21 February 1998 along with Eyes of the Spider. Despite being released direct-to-video, the production company Daiei Film ensured that Serpent's Path also received theatrical distribution. The film is regarded as a cult classic.

A DVD containing both Serpent's Path and Eyes of the Spider was released in the UK by Third Window Films on 9 September 2013.

A 4K restoration was screened theatrically in Taiwan in October of 2024.

=== Remake ===
In 2024, Kurosawa re-made the film based on his own script. The remake stars Damien Bonnard and Ko Shibasaki.
