= Apartment Wife: Affair in the Afternoon =

- Theatrical poster for Apartment Wife: Affair in the Afternoon (1971)
- Directed by: Shōgorō Nishimura
- Written by: Kazuo Nishida
- Produced by: Yasushi Takeda
- Starring: Kazuko Shirakawa
- Cinematography: Shōhei Andō
- Edited by: Atsushi Nabeshima
- Music by: Sansaku Okuzawa
- Distributed by: Nikkatsu
- Release date: November 20, 1971
- Running time: 64 minutes
- Country: Japan
- Language: Japanese

Apartment Wife: Affair in the Afternoon (団地妻 昼下がりの情事 / 団地妻 昼下りの情事, Danchizuma hirusagari no jōji) a.k.a. From 3 to Sex is a 1971 Japanese film in Nikkatsu's Roman Porno series. The first film in this successful new direction for the studio, it was directed by Shōgorō Nishimura and starred Kazuko Shirakawa.

== Synopsis ==
A working-class housewife is sexually unsatisfied by her husband, and seeks fulfillment through extramarital relationships. Her affairs are discovered by a female brothel-owner who then blackmails the woman into working in her stable of prostitutes.

== Cast ==
- Kazuko Shirakawa - Ritsuko Kasai
- Tatsuya Hamaguchi - Ryōhei Kasai
- Maki Nanjō - Yōko Higashiyama
- Junpō Sekido - Ichirō Irimura
- Yōko Mita - Kazumi Kōno
- Sōichirō Maeno - Hatanaka
- Ryūji Ōizumi - Koike
- Kunosuki Koizumi - Naked man

== Background ==
During the late 1960s and early 1970s, Nikkatsu, Japan's oldest film studio, was losing much of their audience to television and the importation of American films, and suffering from expensive, unsuccessful projects. Struggling to keep the studio out of bankruptcy, Takashi Itamochi, Nikkatsu's president, decided to put the company's high production values and professional talent into the adult, or pink film industry as a way of attracting a new audience. Until this time the pink film market had been almost entirely the realm of low-budget independent companies. This new direction for the studio was inaugurated with Apartment Wife: Affair in the Afternoon. These often well-made and artistic softcore pornographic films proved popular with both the public and the critics. This introduction of pornography into mainstream Japanese movie theaters has been credited with saving Nikkatsu from collapse at that time. For the next 17 years Nikkatsu produced Roman Porno films almost exclusively.

== Release ==
Apartment Wife: Affair in the Afternoon was released in Japan on 20 November 1971.

== Critical appraisal ==
Apartment Wife: Affair in the Afternoon was an immediate hit with film audiences, and gained critical approval. The film made a mainstream star of Kazuko Shirakawa, who had been appearing in independent pink films since 1967.

In their Japanese Cinema Encyclopedia: The Sex Films, the Weissers credit the success of the film both to director Nishimura and lead actress Kazuko Shirakawa. Nishimura, they write, "pays particularly close attention to his characters, often allowing their lusty personalities to carry the tale without clichéd action subplots. This results in a highly unique voyeuristic view of life, seldom achieved in the cinema." They judge that Shirakawa gives the film, "a wide-eyed innocence that is both fresh and convincing."

== Legacy ==
The success of Apartment Wife: Affair in the Afternoon inspired 20 direct sequels—four in 1972—and numerous unofficial sequels and series. Shōgorō Nishimura became a regular Nikkatsu director, helming seven of the Apartment Wife sequels. Kazuko Shirakawa became Nikkatsu's first Roman Porno queen. Though she appeared in only the first Apartment Wife sequel, titles to unrelated films in which she starred, such as Afternoon Affair: Rear Window and Affair at Twilight (both 1972), capitalized on the success of her first starring role for Nikkatsu. Besides the official sequels, the success of the film created the "Apartment wife" genre of pink film, a genre still popular with directors of the current "Four Heavenly Kings of Pink" (ピンク四天王, pinku shitenno) generation, represented by such works as Toshiki Satō's "Apartment Wife" films of the 1990s, including his Apartment Wife: Moans from Next Door (2000).

== Availability ==
Apartment Wife: Affair in the Afternoon was re-released on DVD in Japan on March 21, 2007, as part of Geneon's seventh wave of Nikkatsu Roman Porno series.

== Bibliography ==
=== English ===
- "DANCHIZUMA HIRUSAGARI NO JOJI". Complete Index to World Film.
- Sharp, Jasper (2008). Behind the Pink Curtain: The Complete History of Japanese Sex Cinema. Godalming, Surrey, England: FAB Press. ISBN 978-1-903254-54-7.
- Weisser, Thomas; Yuko Mihara Weisser (1998). Japanese Cinema Encyclopedia: The Sex Films. Miami: Vital Books: Asian Cult Cinema Publications. ISBN 1-889288-52-7.

=== Japanese ===
- 団地妻 昼下がりの情事(1971) (in Japanese). allcinema.net.
- 団地妻・昼下りの情事 (in Japanese). Japanese Movie Database.
- "団地妻 昼下りの情事". Japanese Cinema Database (Agency for Cultural Affairs). Archived from the original on 2011-10-08.
- 団地妻 昼下りの情事(邦画 ) (in Japanese). Kinema Junpo. Archived from the original on 2010-07-13.
- 団地妻・昼下りの情事 (in Japanese). www.nikkatsu-romanporno.com. Archived from the original on 2009-01-06.
- 団地妻 昼下りの情事 (in Japanese). www.walkerplus.com. Archived from the original on 2004-11-25.
