= Serpent's Path (2024 film) =

2024 film directed by Kiyoshi Kurosawa

- Theatrical release poster
- French: La Voie du serpent
- Directed by: Kiyoshi Kurosawa
- Screenplay by: Kiyoshi Kurosawa; Aurélien Ferenczi
- Based on: Serpent's Path (1998) by: Kiyoshi Kurosawa; Hiroshi Takahashi
- Starring: Damien Bonnard; Ko Shibasaki
- Cinematography: Alex Kavyrchine
- Edited by: Thomas Marchand
- Music by: Nicolas Errera
- Production companies: Cinefrance Studios; Kadokawa; Tarantula
- Release date: 14 June 2024 (Japan)
- Running time: 112 minutes
- Countries: France; Belgium; Luxembourg; Japan
- Language: French

Serpent's Path (French: La Voie du serpent) is a 2024 thriller film directed by Kiyoshi Kurosawa starring Damien Bonnard and Ko Shibasaki.

A French-language remake of Kurosawa's 1998 film of the same name, Serpent's Path screened at the 2024 San Sebastián International Film Festival.

== Plot ==
Grieving father Albert enlists Japanese psychiatrist Sayoko to exact revenge on members of The Circle, an organ trafficking organization involved in the death of his eight-year-old daughter.

== Cast ==
- Damien Bonnard as Albert Bachelet
- Ko Shibasaki as Sayoko Niijima
- Mathieu Amalric as Laval
- Grégoire Colin as Pierre Guérin
- Hidetoshi Nishijima as Yoshimura, Sayoko's patient
- Munetaka Aoki as Soichiro, Sayoko's husband
- Éric Bernard as a police officer

== Production ==
According to Kurosawa, the film originated with Cinefrance Studios' offer to remake one of his prior films in France. Kurosawa and French journalist Aurélien Ferenczi wrote the new version of the screenplay, changing the gender of the doctor role from the original screenplay by Hiroshi Takahashi. Serpent's Path was filmed on location in France in 2023, specifically in Île-de-France. Shibasaki took French lessons for six months to prepare for the role.

== Release ==
Serpent's Path was released theatrically in Japan on 14 June 2024. The film screened in competition at the 72nd San Sebastián International Film Festival in September 2024. It was released in France on 3 September 2025.

It was also selected in Gala Presentation at the 29th Busan International Film Festival to be screened on October 4, 2024.

== Reception ==
=== Critical response ===
On the review aggregator website Rotten Tomatoes, 83% of 18 critics' reviews are positive, with an average rating of 7/10. Metacritic, which uses a weighted average, assigned the film a score of 56 out of 100, based on 5 critics, indicating "mixed or average" reviews.

=== Accolades ===
| Award | Ceremony date | Category | Recipient(s) | Result | Ref. |
|---|---|---|---|---|---|
| San Sebastián International Film Festival | 28 September 2024 | Golden Shell for Best Film | Serpent's Path | Nominated | |
