= License to Live =

- DVD cover
- Directed by: Kiyoshi Kurosawa
- Written by: Kiyoshi Kurosawa
- Produced by: Atsuyuki Shimoda; Satoshi Jinno; Tsutomu Tsuchikawa; Hiroyuki Kato
- Starring: Hidetoshi Nishijima; Kōji Yakusho
- Cinematography: Junichiro Hayashi
- Edited by: Masahiro Onaga
- Music by: Gary Ashiya
- Release dates: 7 November 1998 (Tokyo); 23 January 1999 (Japan)
- Running time: 109 minutes
- Country: Japan
- Language: Japanese

License to Live (Japanese: ニンゲン合格, Hepburn: Ningen gōkaku) is a 1998 Japanese drama film written and directed by Kiyoshi Kurosawa. Starring Hidetoshi Nishijima and Kōji Yakusho, the film follows a young man's attempts to rebuild his life after waking up from a 10 year coma. It premiered at the 1998 Toronto International Film Festival to mostly positive reviews.

== Plot ==
Twenty-four-year-old Yutaka Yoshii wakes up in a hospital room after lying in a coma for ten years. His family is nowhere to be found, with only the man who was responsible for his accident and subsequent coma coming to visit him and giving him money upon his wake-up in an attempt to "put this behind [him]". Shortly after, he is picked up by his father's old loner friend, Fujimori, who takes him to his fish farm to live, which is on the Yoshii family plot.

From here on, he is assigned a number of odd jobs around the farm. While an adult physically, Yutaka displays childlike behavior mentally and finds it difficult to adjust to his new life. The most notable aspect of this was when he was forcefully taken to a prostitute by Fujimori. He also hangs out with his childhood friends from time to time.

His family eventually comes to visit him one by one after learning about his recovery. His father comes by first and learns that he and his mother divorced after his coma, his sister is engaged to a man and are seemingly bound to leave for America and his mother works in a cloth shop. His mother is the only one he has some sort of connection with as they had all made their peace with his coma and said their goodbyes. His mom tells him that he should lead his own life.

This propels Yutaka to reopen their family's old pony farm as he starts to build one in their plot in hopes of reuniting his family. He even opens up a small milk bar on the side as well. One day, he meets the man responsible for his accident again who is envious about his apparent "success" while he only lives a miserable existence as a construction worker riddled with guilt about the incident. That night, he destroys most of the pony farm in rage in front of Yutaka who initially tries to defend the place but realizes that the farm was just a part of his childhood that he deemed as a happy memory and that he has accomplished his task to recreate and relieve in that familial feeling again. Yutuka ultimately finishes the destruction of the farm himself.

Fujimori, who had been gone for an extended period of time following Yutaka's father deeding him and Chizuru the family property, leaving Yutaka alone, comes back again to the more mature Yutaka. They agree to leave the farm and travel around the country in search of a new life. However, while loading Yutuka's salvaged horse from the "pony farm", in a freak accident, a load of refrigerators that Fujimori had previously brought back toppled onto him, killing him with Fujimori by his side. Yutaka is, at the end of his life, content with the way he lived upon waking from his coma. After the funeral, with his father, mother, and sister together for the first time in the film, Fujimori decides to leave by himself while carrying memories of Yutaka with him.

== Cast ==
- Hidetoshi Nishijima as Yutaka Yoshii
- Kōji Yakusho as Fujimori
- Shun Sugata as Shinichiro Yoshii
- Lily as Sachiko
- Kumiko Asō as Chizuru Yoshii
- Show Aikawa as Kazaki
- Yoriko Dōguchi as Miki
- Ren Osugi as Murota
- Hiromitsu Suzuki as Kurume
- Kōsuke Toyohara as Doctor
- Masahiro Toda as Akira Ueda

== Reception ==
Stephen Holden at the New York Times stated that "the metaphysical humor it gleans from the situation marks Mr. Kurosawa (who is no relation to Akira Kurosawa) as a quirky, smart filmmaker." The critic Tom Mes wrote that the film "strays far off the beaten path, shunning the predictability of your average celluloid tragedy to deliver genuine laughs".
