= Kiyoshi Kurosawa =

Japanese filmmaker and critic (born 1955)

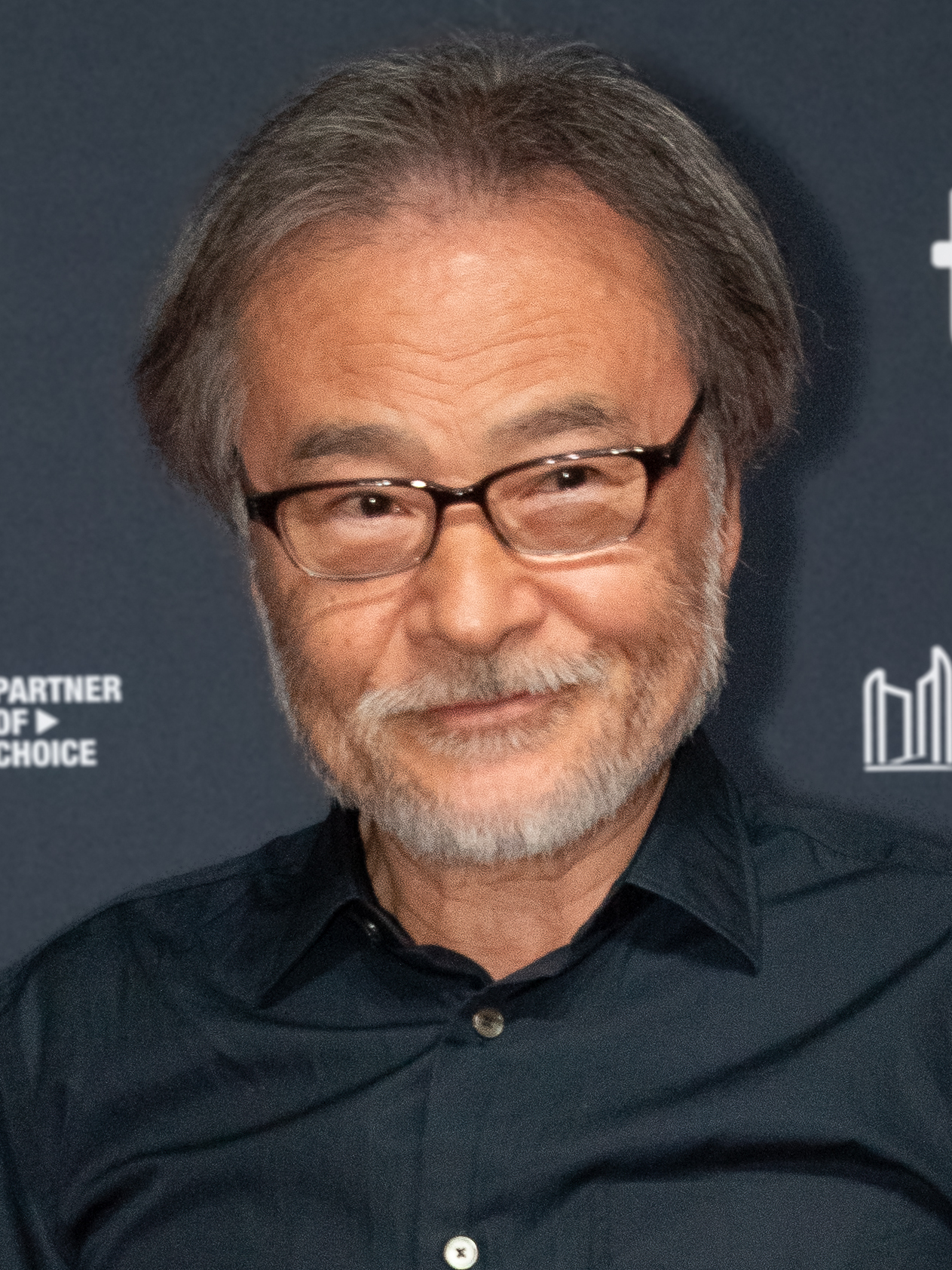
- Kurosawa at the 2024 Toronto International Film Festival
- Born: July 19, 1955 (age 71); Kobe, Japan
- Education: Rikkyo University
- Occupations: Film director, screenwriter, film critic, author, actor
- Years active: 1973–present

Kiyoshi Kurosawa (Note: /kʊərəˈsɑːwə/) (黒沢 清, Kurosawa Kiyoshi; born July 19, 1955) is a Japanese filmmaker, critic, author, actor, and a former professor at Tokyo University of the Arts (2005–23).

Noted for his psychological films that often focus on ambiguous narratives and on their characters' inner turmoils and quests for meaning and connections, he is best known for his contributions to psychological horror and Japanese horror, notably his acclaimed 1997 film Cure and his 2001 film Pulse, although he has also worked in a variety of other genres. While most of his work has been in Japanese, two of his films, Daguerrotype (2016) and Serpent's Path (2024; a remake of his own 1998 film of the same name), were in French.

Kurosawa received the Medal with Purple Ribbon for his contributions to Japanese cinema, in 2021. The New York Times stated that Kurosawa "is to psychological fright what David Cronenberg is to body horror."

== Early life and education ==
Born in Kobe on July 19, 1955, Kiyoshi Kurosawa started making films about his life in high school. He studied at Rikkyo University in Tokyo under the guidance of prominent film critic Shigehiko Hasumi, where he began making 8mm films.

Though they share a surname, he is not related to filmmaker Akira Kurosawa.

== Filmmaking career ==
Kurosawa began directing commercially in the 1980s, working on pink films and low-budget V-Cinema (direct-to-video) productions such as formula yakuza films. In 1981, his 8mm film Shigarami Gakuen (しがらみ学園) was nominated for the Oshima Prize at the PFF (Pia Film Festival). In 1983, after he worked with Shinji Soumai, he released his first feature film Kandagawa Pervert Wars (1983). He became popular after The Excitement of the Do-Re-Mi-Fa Girl (1985) and The Guard from Underground (1992).

In the early 1990s, Kurosawa won a scholarship to the Sundance Institute by submitting his original screen play Charisma. Then, he was able to study filmmaking in the United States, although he had been directing for nearly ten years professionally.

Kurosawa first achieved international acclaim with his 1997 crime thriller film Cure. A year later, he completed two thrillers back-to-back, Serpent's Path and Eyes of the Spider, both of which shared the same premise (a father taking revenge for his child's murder) and lead actor (Show Aikawa) but spun entirely different stories. In March 1999, the Hong Kong International Film Festival presented his first retrospective, a five-title-program including The Excitement of the Do-re-mi fa Girls, The Guard from Underground, Serpent's Path, Eyes of the Spider, and License to Live.

Kurosawa followed up Cure with a semi-sequel in 1999 with Charisma, a detective film starring Kōji Yakusho. In 2000, Seance, Kurosawa's adaptation of the novel Seance on a Wet Afternoon by Mark McShane, premiered on Kansai TV. It also starred Yakusho, as well as Jun Fubuki (the two had appeared together in Charisma as well). In 2001, he directed the horror film Pulse. Kurosawa released Bright Future, starring Tadanobu Asano, Joe Odagiri and Tatsuya Fuji, in 2003. He followed this with another digital feature, Doppelganger, later the same year. Both Bright Future and Doppelganger have nominated for the Cannes Film Festivals

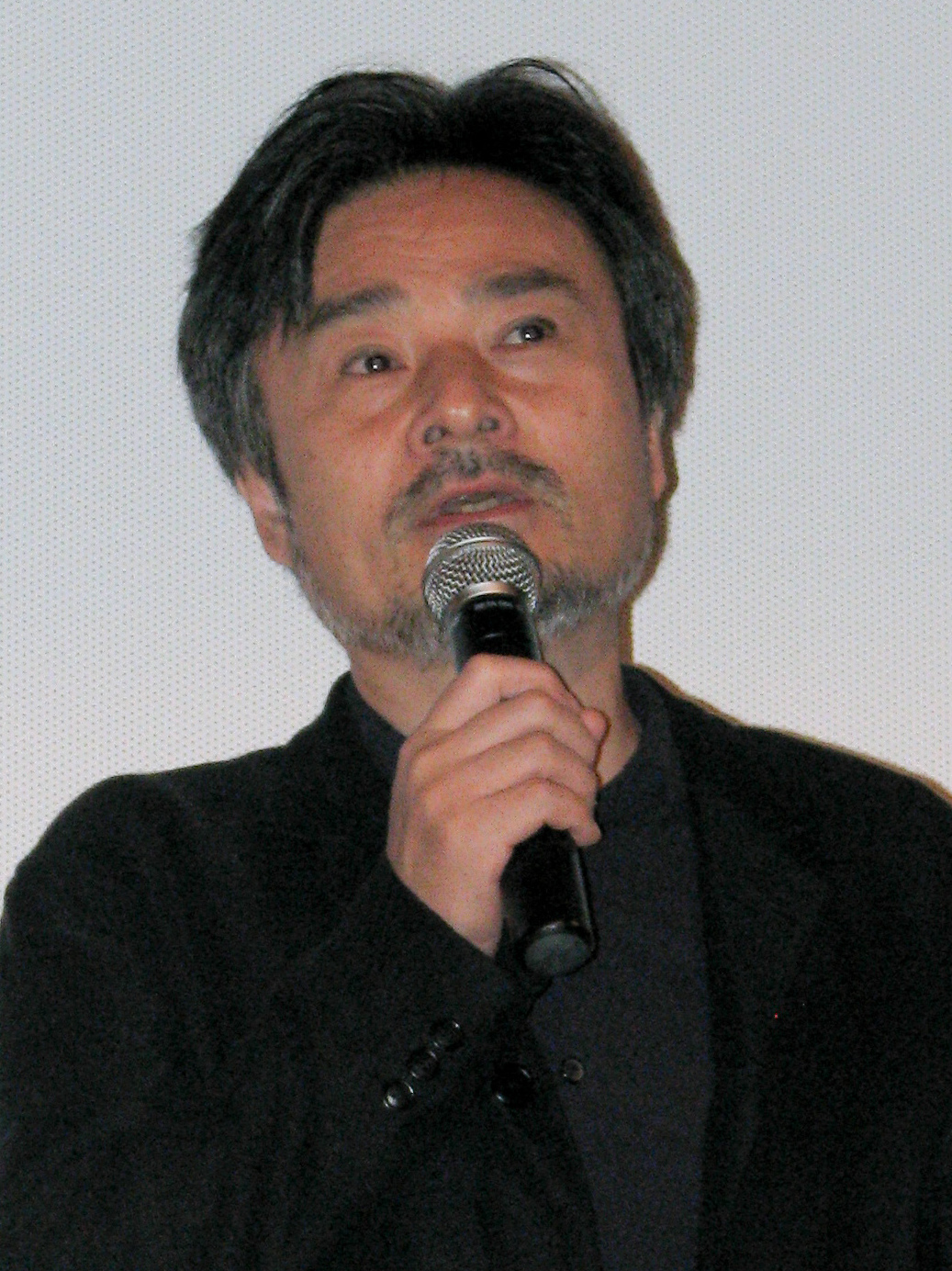
Kurosawa in 2008

In 2005, Kurosawa returned with Loft, his first love story since Seance. Another horror film, Retribution, followed in the next year. With his 2008 film, Tokyo Sonata, Kurosawa was considered to step "out of his usual horror genre and into family drama".

He has written a novelization of his own film Pulse, as well as a history of horror cinema with Makoto Shinozaki.

In September 2012, it was announced that he would direct 1905, a film starring Tony Leung Chiu-Wai, Shota Matsuda and Atsuko Maeda. In February 2013, it was announced that production of the film had been cancelled before filming could start.

Kurosawa directed a 2012 five-part television drama Penance. Beautiful 2013, an anthology film featuring Kurosawa's Beautiful New Bay Area Project, screened at the Hong Kong International Film Festival in 2013.

Kurosawa's next feature film Real, which stars Takeru Sato and Haruka Ayase, was released in 2013. He won the Best Director award at the 8th Rome Film Festival for Seventh Code later that year.

His 2015 film Journey to the Shore was screened in the Un Certain Regard section at the 2015 Cannes Film Festival where he won the prize for Best Director.

In 2016, his thriller Creepy premiered at the 66th Berlin International Film Festival. The film marked Kurosawa's first cinematic return to the horror genre since 2006.

His 2017 film Before We Vanish was screened in the Un Certain Regard category at the Cannes Film Festival.

His 2019 film To the Ends of the Earth was screened as the closing film in the Piazza Grande program of the 72nd Locarno Film Festival.

In 2020, Kurosawa won the Silver Lion for Best Direction at the 77th Venice International Film Festival for his film Wife of a Spy.

Kurosawa directed three films in 2024: the short film Chime, a French-language remake of Serpent's Path, and the thriller Cloud. The latter was nominated for Best Film at that year's Sitges Film Festival.

His first jidaigeki (period drama) The Samurai and the Prisoner is scheduled to premiere in June 2026.

== Academic career ==
From 2005 to 2023, Kurosawa was a Professor at the Tokyo University of the Arts's Graduate School of Film and New Media.

== Style and influences ==
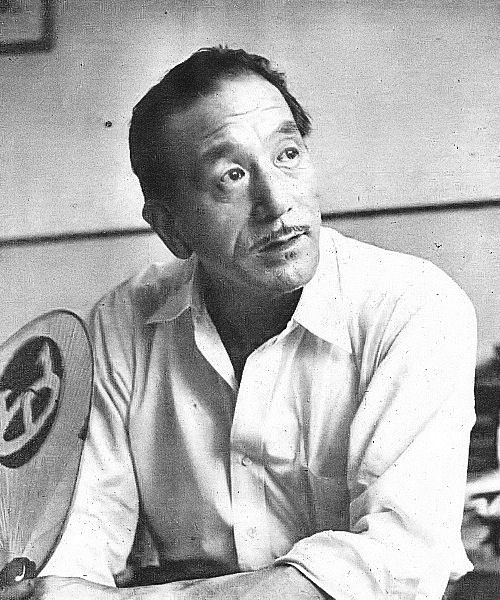
Yasujiro Ozu

Kurosawa's filmmaking style has been compared to those of Stanley Kubrick and Andrei Tarkovsky, though he has never expressly listed those directors as influences. In an interview, he claimed that Alfred Hitchcock and Yasujirō Ozu contributed to shaping his personal vision of the medium. He has also expressed admiration for American film directors such as Don Siegel, Sam Peckinpah, Robert Aldrich, Richard Fleischer, and Tobe Hooper. In a 2000 interview with Time, Kurosawa noted his appreciation for John Cassavetes, stating, "When I watch a Cassavetes film, I am awed by the understanding that people can subtly change in the course of a simple conversation." Through his association with mentor Shigehiko Hasumi, Kurosawa was also influenced by Jean-Luc Godard.

In a 2009 interview with IFC, Kurosawa talked about the reason why he has cast the actor Kōji Yakusho in many of his films: "He has similar values and sensitivities. We're from the same generation. That's a big reason why I enjoy working with him on the set."

According to Tim Palmer, Kurosawa's films occupy a peculiar position between the materials of mass genre, on the one hand, and esoteric or intellectual abstraction, on the other. They also clearly engage with issues of environmental critique, given Kurosawa's preference for shooting in decaying open spaces, abandoned (and often condemned) buildings, and in places rife with toxins, pestilence and entropy.

In an interview with the Tokyo Art University, where he is a professor, Kurosawa talks about not wanting his directorial style to be too fixed. The interviewer makes reference to Kurosawa's versatility when they talk about Clint Eastwood; Kurosawa says he admires people who can do many things and that he doesn't box himself into one style or one theme. When asked what he wants to try next, he answered: "The next thing I want to do is something I have never done." Kurosawa also mentions that he has seen many films since he was young, and that he knows there are many great films from around the world. Those films motivate him to be a better filmmaker; he always asks himself how to make films that will be memorable for a long time.

In the same article by the Tokyo Art University, Kurosawa names film critic Hasumi Shigehiko as a mentor and early influence in his filmmaking career. Much of Hasumi's influence would go on to shape the core of Kurosawa's filmography. Kurosawa met Hasumi in University, where he was one of the few students to finish his course, and credits Hasumi with teaching him that film is worth dedicating your entire life to. Hasumi and Kurosawa believe that every element of the film matters and should be meticulously planned. Kurosawa has also stated that one of his goals as a filmmaker is to share Hasumi's teachings.

== Personal life ==
=== Political activities ===
In December 2023, alongside 50 other filmmakers, Kurosawa signed an open letter published in Libération demanding a ceasefire and an end to the killing of civilians amid the 2023 Israeli invasion of the Gaza Strip, and for a humanitarian corridor into Gaza to be established for humanitarian aid, and the release of hostages.

== Filmography ==
=== Feature films ===
Year	English title	Original title	Notes
1983	Kandagawa Pervert Wars	神田川淫乱戦争	
1985	The Excitement of the Do-Re-Mi-Fa Girl		
1989	Sweet Home	スウィートホーム	
1989	Dangerous Bedtime Stories	危ない話 夢幻物語	Segment: "They Came Tonight As Well"
1992	The Guard from Underground	地獄の警備員	
1996	Door III	DOOR III	
1997	Cure	キュア	
1998	Serpent's Path	蛇の道	
1998	Eyes of the Spider	蜘蛛の瞳	
1998	License to Live	ニンゲン合格	
1999	Charisma	カリスマ	
1999	Barren Illusion		
2001	Pulse	回路	
2003	Bright Future	アカルイミライ	
2003	Doppelganger	ドッペルゲンガー	
2005	Kazuo Umezu's Horror Theater: House of Bugs	楳図かずお恐怖劇場	
2005	Loft		
2006	Retribution	叫	
2008	Tokyo Sonata	トウキョウソナタ	
2013	Real	リアル〜完全なる首長竜の日〜	
2015	Journey to the Shore	岸辺の旅	
2016	Creepy	クリーピー 偽りの隣人	
2016	Daguerrotype	Le Secret de la chambre noire	French-language debut
2017	Before We Vanish	散歩する侵略者	
2017	Foreboding	予兆 散歩する侵略者	
2019	To the Ends of the Earth	旅のおわり世界のはじまり	
2020	Wife of a Spy	スパイの妻	
2024	Serpent's Path	La Voie du serpent	
2024	Cloud	クラウド	
2026	The Samurai and the Prisoner	黒牢城	

=== Unrealized projects ===
- 1905 (一九〇五) - A period drama set in early-20th-century Yokohama, starring Tony Leung Chiu-wai, Shota Matsuda, and Atsuko Maeda. Partly financed by Hong Kong studio Sil-Metropole Organisation. Filming was set to begin in Taiwan in fall 2012, for a fall 2013 release. Production was cancelled prematurely due to Leung's involvement exacerbated by the Senkaku Islands dispute and the bankruptcy of studio Prenom H on 20 February 2013.

=== Short films ===
- Vertigo College (1980)
- Ghost Cop (2003)
- Beautiful New Bay Area Project (2013)
- Seventh Code (2013)
- Chime (2024)

=== V-Cinema ===
- Yakuza Taxi (1994)
- Men of Rage (1994)
- Suit Yourself or Shoot Yourself: The Heist (1995)
- Suit Yourself or Shoot Yourself: The Escape (1995)
- Door 3 (1996)
- Suit Yourself or Shoot Yourself: The Loot (1996)
- Suit Yourself or Shoot Yourself: The Gamble (1996)
- Suit Yourself or Shoot Yourself: The Nouveau Riche (1996)
- Suit Yourself or Shoot Yourself: The Hero (1996)
- The Revenge: A Visit from Fate (1997)
- The Revenge: A Scar That Never Fades (1997)
- Eyes of the Spider (1998)

=== DVD ===
- Soul Dancing (2004)

=== Television ===
- Wordholic Prisoner (1990)
- Whirlpool of Joy (1992)
- Séance (2000)
- Matasaburo, the Wind Imp (2003)
- Penance (2012)
- Foreboding (2017)
- Wife of a Spy (2020)
- Modern Love Tokyo (2022, episode 5)

=== Acting credits ===
- The Funeral (1984) – Assistant director
- The Legend of the Stardust Brothers (1985) – Customer
- The Enchantment (1989) – Librarian
- Stranger at Night (1991) – Taxi rider
- Reincarnation (2005) – College professor
- Occult (2009) – Himself

=== Music videos ===
- Marquees – Tongati Musume (1991)
- Sōtaisei Riron – Flashback (2016)
- Nogizaka46 – Actually... (2022)

== Bibliography ==
Year	English Title	Original Title	Publisher	Notes
1992	Film History of Kiyoshi Kurosawa	映像のカリスマ 黒沢清映画史	Film Art Inc.	
2001	Eiga wa Osoroshi	映画はおそろしい	Seidosha	
2006	Technique of Kiyoshi Kurosawa	黒沢清の映画術	Shinchosha	
2007	Scary Story of Film	映画のこわい話 黒沢清対談集	Seidosha	
2008	More Scary Story of Film	恐怖の対談 映画のもっとこわい話	Seidosha	
2010	Kurosawa Kiyoshi talking about 21st century movies	黒沢清、21世紀の映画を語る	Boid	
Co-written
2000	Lost in America	ロスト イン アメリカ	Digital Hollywood	
2003	Scary film history of Kurosawa Kiyoshi	黒沢清の恐怖の映画史	Seidosha	
2004	Film Class, from class room of School of Cinema	映画の授業 映画美学校の教室から	Seidosha	
2010	Modern American film discussion with Eastwood, Spielberg, and Tarantino from Tokyo	東京から 現代アメリカ映画談 イーストウッド、スピルバーグ、タランティーノ	Seidosha	
2010	Japanese Film is Living	日本映画は生きている	Iwanami Shoten	
2011	Long Story about Film	映画長話	Little More	
Films adapted into novels
1997	Cure	キュア	Tokuma Bunko	
2001	Pulse	回路	Tokuma Bunko	

== Accolades ==
Institution	Year	Category	Work	Result	Ref.
Asian Film Awards	2009	Best Screenplay	Wife of a Spy	Nominated	
Asian Film Awards	2016	Best Screenplay	Journey to the Shore	Nominated	
Asian Film Awards	2021	Best Director	Tokyo Sonata	Won	
Asia Pacific Screen Awards	2008	Best Director	Tokyo Sonata	Nominated	
Asia Pacific Screen Awards	2008	Best Screenplay	Tokyo Sonata	Nominated	
Busan International Film Festival	2024	Asian Filmmaker of the Year	—N/a	Won	
Cahiers du Cinéma	2009	Annual Top 10 Lists	Tokyo Sonata	9th place	
Cahiers du Cinéma	2015	Annual Top 10 Lists	Journey to the Shore	10th place	
Cannes Film Festival	1999	SACD Prize	Charisma	Nominated	
Cannes Film Festival	1999	CICAE Award	Charisma	Nominated	
Cannes Film Festival	2001	Un Certain Regard	Pulse	Nominated	
Cannes Film Festival	2001	FIPRESCI Prize	Pulse	Won	
Cannes Film Festival	2003	Palme d'Or	Bright Future	Nominated	
Cannes Film Festival	2008	Un Certain Regard	Tokyo Sonata	Nominated	
Cannes Film Festival	2008	Un Certain Regard Jury Prize	Tokyo Sonata	Won	
Cannes Film Festival	2015	Un Certain Regard	Journey to the Shore	Nominated	
Cannes Film Festival	2015	Un Certain Regard Directing Prize	Journey to the Shore	Won	
Cannes Film Festival	2017	Un Certain Regard	Before We Vanish	Nominated	
Chicago International Film Festival	2008	Grand Jury Prize	Tokyo Sonata	Won	
El Gouna Film Festival	2020	Golden Star	Wife of a Spy	Nominated	
Fantasia Film Festival	2001	Critics' Prize	Séance	Nominated	
Fantasia Film Festival	2016	Best Director	Creepy	Nominated	
Fribourg International Film Festival	2013	Grand Prix	Penance	Nominated	
Fribourg International Film Festival	2013	FIPRESCI Prize	Penance	Won	
Hainan International Film Festival	2020	Golden Coconut	Wife of a Spy	Nominated	
Hainan International Film Festival	2020	Audience Award	Wife of a Spy	Nominated	
Huading Awards	2021	Best Global Director	Wife of a Spy	Won	
Japan Academy Film Prize	2018	Director of the Year	Before We Vanish	Nominated	
Japanese Professional Movie Awards	1998	Best Film	Cure	Won	
Japanese Professional Movie Awards	1999	Best Film	Serpent's Path	Won	
Japanese Professional Movie Awards	2004	Best Film	Bright Future	Won	
Japanese Professional Movie Awards	2004	Best Director	Bright Future	Won	
Japanese Professional Movie Awards	2004	Best Director	Doppelganger	Won	
Jeonju International Film Festival	2001	Asian Indie Cine-Forum Woosuk Award	Séance	Nominated	
Kinema Junpo	2009	Best Film of the Year	Tokyo Sonata	Nominated	
Kinema Junpo	2017	Best Film of the Year	Creepy	Nominated	
Kinema Junpo	2018	Best Film of the Year	Before We Vanish	Nominated	
Locarno Film Festival	2013	Golden Leopard	Real	Nominated	
Locarno Film Festival	2019	Variety Piazza Grande Award	To the Ends of the Earth	Nominated	
Mar del Plata International Film Festival	2008	International Competition	Tokyo Sonata	Nominated	
Mar del Plata International Film Festival	2008	Best Director	Tokyo Sonata	Won	
Munich Film Festival	2015	Best International Film	Journey to the Shore	Nominated	
Munich Film Festival	2021	Best International Film	Wife of a Spy	Nominated	
Neuchâtel International Fantastic Film Festival	2017	Best Film	Before We Vanish	Nominated	
Nippon Connection	2016	Nippon Honor Award	—N/a	Won	
Nippon Connection	2021	Best Film	To the Ends of the Earth	Nominated	
Osian's Cinefan Festival of Asian and Arab Cinema	2008	Best Film	Tokyo Sonata	Won	
Pink Film Awards	1984	Top 10 Films	Kandagawa Pervert Wars	3rd place	
Rome Film Festival	2013	Cinema XXI Award	Beautiful New Bay Area Project	Nominated	
Rome Film Festival	2013	Golden Marc'Aueilo	Seventh Code	Nominated	
Rome Film Festival	2013	Best Director	Seventh Code	Won	
San Sebastián International Film Festival	2020	Audience Award	Wife of a Spy	Nominated	
San Sebastián International Film Festival	2024	Golden Seashell	Serpent's Path	Nominated	
Seattle International Film Festival	2001	Emerging Masters Showcase Award	—N/a	Won	
Shanghai International Film Festival	2015	Golden Goblet	Journey to the Shore	Nominated	
Singapore International Film Festival	2000	Best Asian Feature Film	Charisma	Nominated	
Sitges Film Festival	2001	Best Film	Pulse	Nominated	
Sitges Film Festival	2001	Critics' Award	Pulse	Won	
Sitges Film Festival	2006	Time-Machine Honorary Award	—N/a	Won	
Sitges Film Festival	2015	Best Motion Picture	Journey to the Shore	Nominated	
Sitges Film Festival	2017	Best Motion Picture	Before We Vanish	Nominated	
Sitges Film Festival	2024	Best Motion Picture	Cloud	Nominated	
Sydney Film Festival	2008	Best Film	Tokyo Sonata	Nominated	
Tokyo International Film Festival	1997	Tokyo Grand Prix	Cure	Nominated	
Tokyo International Film Festival	1998	Tokyo Grand Prix	License to Live	Nominated	
Tokyo International Film Festival	1998	Special Mention	License to Live	Won	
Tokyo International Film Festival	2016	Samurai Award	—N/a	Won	
Toronto International Film Festival	2016	Platform Prize	Daguerrotype	Nominated	
Venice International Film Festival	1999	Cinema of the Present	Barren Illusion	Nominated	
Venice International Film Festival	2020	Golden Lion	Wife of a Spy	Nominated	
Venice International Film Festival	2020	Silver Lion	Wife of a Spy	Won	
Yokohama Film Festival	1999	Best Director	Cure	Nominated	

== Honors ==
- Medal with Purple Ribbon (2021)
