= Kazuko Shirakawa =

Japanese actress (born 1947)

- Born: September 30, 1947 (age 79); Nagasaki, Japan
- Years active: 1967–present

Kazuko Shirakawa (白川 和子, Shirakawa Kazuko) (born September 30, 1947) is a Japanese actress who is best known for her appearances in Nikkatsu's Roman Porno films during the 1970s. She appeared in Nikkatsu's first film in the Roman Porno series, Apartment Wife (1971), and is considered the first of the three "Nikkatsu Queens" of the 1970s. After 1976 she embarked on a successful career in mainstream film.

== Life and career ==
=== Early career ===
Shirakawa was born in Nagasaki, on Japan's southernmost main island of Kyūshū. She debuted in pink films in 1967, at first working in supporting roles. Though her early performances in films such as Nihon Cinema's Technique of Fainting have been called "green," she still overshadowed the nominal star of the movie. It was in her films for independent studios in the late 1960s that Shirakawa established her on-screen character as that of a "naive whore." The naivete was not entirely an act, since, in an interview for Book Cinematheque, Shirakawa admitted that she was a virgin until after her debut for Nikkatsu in 1971.

By 1968, Shirakawa was starring in these low-budget softcore films. Top Secret Account of Japanese Customs and Manners: Breasts had Shirakawa playing the role of an innocent geisha, though the story took second place in this film which was "primarily concerned with exposing Kazuko Shirakawa's impressive chest as often as possible." About these early performances, Shirakawa later said, "I was scared to death. I didn't know how to express the ecstasy expected from these parts."

Also in 1968, she starred in Sex Before Marriage for Tokyo Koei studio. Like Shirakawa, Yamamoto would gain lasting fame later making Roman Porno films for Nikkatsu. In 1969, Shirakawa co-starred in Hunting Breasts, another breast-fixated opus. Starring the buxom Minoru Sawada, and directed by Sawada's husband, the film was a financial failure at the time, but has gained a cult audience in recent years.

=== Nikkatsu ===
Until the late 1960s, the "pink film" market was almost entirely the domain of low-budget independent companies. At the beginning of the 1970s, now losing their audiences to television and imported American films, Japan's major film studios were struggling for survival. In order to attract a new audience, Toei entered the sexploitation market in 1971 with its "Pinky Violence" series. Takashi Itamochi, president of Nikkatsu, Japan's oldest major film studio, then made the decision to put his own company's high production values and professional talent into the lucrative pink film genre.

As one of the leading actresses of the pink film, Nikkatsu hired Shirakawa to star in its first effort in this genre. Most actresses who moved to Nikkatsu after starring in independent pink films had to change their stage names. However Nikkatsu did not demand that Shirakawa do this. Nikkatsu launched its Roman Porno series in November 1971 with Apartment Wife: Affair in the Afternoon, which featured Shirakawa in the starring role. The film became a huge hit and made Shirakawa "the first mega-star of Nikkatsu's lucrative pinku eiga period in the '70s." The film was such a success it inspired 20 sequels within seven years, and launched the high-profile Roman porno version of pink film which Nikkatsu would make almost exclusively, at an average rate of three per month, for the next 17 years.

=== Later career ===
Kazuko Shirakawa has gone on to a successful mainstream film career. She had roles in three films by Shohei Imamura, and appeared in director Hirokazu Koreeda's After Life (1998).

== Selected filmography ==
=== 1967 ===
- Girl's Dormitory (女子寮 - Joshiryo) (May 16)
- Technique of Fainting (Shisshin no Technique)

=== 1968 ===
- Top Secret Account of Japanese customs and Manners: Breasts (日本（秘）風俗史 乳房 - Nihon Maruhi Fuzokushi Chibusa) (February)
- Taste of Woman… Taste of Man (女と男の味くらべ - Onna to Otoko no Ajikurabe) (August)
- Sex Drive (セックスドライブ - Sex Drive) (October)
- Crimson Haired Girl (Makka na Ubuge)
- Certain Pregnancy (Aru Ninshin)
- Orgy at the Tea House (Ozashiki 48 Tai)
- Sex Before Marriage (Kozen Kojyoki)

=== 1969 ===
- All the Tricks in Life (Shin Jinsei Yonjuhatte Uraomote)
- Hunting Breasts (Chibusa no Mitsuryoh)

=== 1971 ===
- Apartment Wife: Affair in the Afternoon (団地妻 昼下がりの情事 - Danchizuma Hirusagari no Joji) (November 20)
- Crazy for Love (恋狂い - Koigurui) (December 1)

=== 1972 ===
- Apartment Wife: Secret Rendezvous ( - Danchizuma Wasureenu Shinobiai)
- Midafternoon Love Affair: Apartment Wife ( - Danchizuma: Mahiru no Joji)
- Affair at Twilight (たそがれの情事 - Tasogare no Joji) (January 8)
- Drifter's Affair (さすらいの情事 - Sasurai no Jouji) (February 19)
- White Skin Glimmering in the Dark (闇に浮ぶ白い肌 - Yami ni Ukabu Shiroi Hada) (June 28)
- Ichijo's Wet Lust (一条さゆり 濡れた欲情 - Ichijo Sayuri Nureta Yokujo) (October 7)
- Love Affair Exposed (覗かれた情事 - Nozokareta Joji) (September 16)
- Afternoon Affair: Rear Window (昼下がりの情事 裏窓 - Hirusagari no Joji: Uramado) (November 18)

=== 1973 ===
- Apartment Wife: Night of the Rape (団地妻 奪われた夜 - Danchizuma: Ubawareta Yoru) (January 13)
- Overly Ripe Breasts: Married Women (熟れすぎた乳房 人妻 - Uresugita Chibusa: Hitozuma) (February 3)
- Naked Resume: True Story of Kazuko Shirakawa (実録白川和子 裸の履歴書 - Jitsuroku Kazuko Shirakawa: Hadaka no Kirekisho) (February 21)

=== 1976 ===
- The Youth Killer (青春の殺人者 - Seishun no satsujin sha) (October 23)

=== 1979 ===
- Vengeance Is Mine (復讐するは我にあり - Fukushu suru wa ware ni ari) (April 21)

=== 1980s ===
- Eijanaika (ええじゃないか - Eijanaika) (March 14, 1981)
- The Family Game (家族ゲーム - Kazoku gêmu) (June 4, 1983)
- Haru no Kane (春の鐘 - Spring Bell) (November 9, 1985)
- Black Rain (黒い雨 - Kuroi ame) (1989)

=== 1990s ===
- After Life (ワンダフルライフ - Wandafuru raifu/Wonderful Life) (April 17, 1999)

=== After 2000 ===
- Lily Festival (2001)
- Blooming Again (2004)
- The Devil's Path (2013)
- Radiance (2017)
- The Nikaidos' Fall (2019)
- Struggling Man (2021)
- Mountain Woman (2023)
- Thorns of Beauty (2023)
- Picture of Spring (2023)
- Six Singing Women (2023)
- Onpaku (2024)
- Sunset Sunrise (2025)
- I Am Kirishima (2025)
- Kaneko Fumiko: Because I Wanted to (2026)
- The Hikikomori Extraction (2026)
- August Grove (2026)
- Trophy (2026)
- Dot to Dot: Will I Be Single Forever? (2026)
- Sleeping in the Red Earth (2027)
- The Intertwining (2027)

== Honours ==
- Kinuyo Tanaka Award (2018)

== See also ==
- List of Nikkatsu Roman Porno films

== Sources ==
- Saotome, Hiromi (2006-03-10). "ロマンポルノの女王*白川和子 ("Roman Porno Queen: Kazuko Shirakawa"". ロマンポルノ女優 (Roman Porno Actresses) (in Japanese). Tokyo: Kawade Shobo Shinsha, Publishers. pp. 12–18. ISBN 4-309-48156-6.
- "Kazuko Shirakawa". The Complete Index to World Film.
- Kazuko Shirakawa at IMDb
- "白川和子 (Shirakawa Kazuko)" (in Japanese). Japanese Movie Database.
- "白川和子 (Shirakawa Kazuko)" (in Japanese). biz.sbrain.co.jp. Archived from the original on 2007-05-09.
- Weisser, Thomas; Yuko Mihara Weisser (1998). Japanese Cinema Encyclopedia: The Sex Films. Miami: Vital Books : Asian Cult Cinema Publications. ISBN 1-889288-52-7.
