= Sachi Hamano =

Japanese film director

- Born: Sachiko Suzuki; March 19, 1948 (age 78); Tokushima Prefecture, Japan
- Occupation: Film director
- Years active: 1971 – present
- Website: http://www.h3.dion.ne.jp/~tantan-s/

Sachi Hamano (浜野佐知, Hamano Sachi) a.k.a. Sachiko Hamano (浜野佐知子, Hamano Sachiko) and Chise Matoba (的場ちせ, Matoba Chise) (born March 19, 1948), is a Japanese film director. She is the most prolific and written-about female pink film director.

== Life and career ==
Sachi Hamano was born as Sachiko Suzuki in Tokushima Prefecture on March 19, 1948. While in high school, Hamano decided she wanted to become a film director. She studied photography for a while in college in Tokyo, then quit to work in film.

"In my 30 years of making porn films, I've always wanted to present them from a woman's perspective."
-- Sachi Hamano

Though the film industry was male-dominated and reluctant to hire a female director, Hamano was able to begin working as an assistant director at independent studios beginning in 1968. Early in her career, at the advice of film producers, Hamano dropped the feminine "ko" ending from her name, Sachiko. She has also used the name Chise Matoba for directing credits. She worked for a while at Kōji Wakamatsu's Wakamatsu Pro, then for other major pink film directors including Genji Nakamura. She made her debut as a director in 1971, with Million Film in 17-Year-Old Free Love Tribe (17才好き好き族) (released 1972).

With the goal of making films from a woman's perspective, in 1984, Hamano founded her own film production company, Tantansha. As a producer and director, she has released over 300 films. For ENK, Hamano filmed the 1990 gay pink film Blazing Men. Her 1997 film, Whore Hospital was given Honorable Mention at the Pink Grand Prix. In 1998, with the financial support of over 12,000 donations from women throughout Japan, she made the film, In Search of a Lost Writer: Wandering the World of the Seventh Sense (第七官界彷徨－尾崎翠を探して), based on the life and work of the female author, Midori Osaki. The film was given the Amari Hayashi Prize at the 2000 Japanese Independent Film Festival.

In 2001 she filmed Lily Festival (2001), based on Hoko Momotani's novel about sexuality among senior citizens. The film was given the Best Feature Film award at the Philadelphia International Gay & Lesbian Film Festival in 2003. In 2006, Hamano returned to Midori Osaki, filming The Cricket Girl, based on one of Osaki's novels. Hamano published her autobiography, When a Woman Makes a Film in 2005.

== Awards ==
- Honorable Mention, Pink Grand Prix, for Whore Hospital
- 4th Women's Culture Prize in 2000
- Japanese Independent Film Festival, 2000
- 9th Festival Internazionale Cinema Delle Donne, 2' Premio
- Philadelphia International Gay & Lesbian Film Festival, Best Feature Film
- Mix Brasil 11, Best Feature Film

== See also ==
- List of female film and television directors
- List of LGBT-related films directed by women
