= Kazuyoshi Sekine =

Japanese Director

Kazuyoshi Sekine (関根和美 Sekine Kazuyoshi), also known as Kazumi Sekine, was a Japanese film director, a dramatist, and a movie producer and the president of Sekine Production production company (関根プロ). He was born in Tokyo in 1954, and died in 2019.

He mainly directs films produced by independent studios.

He is married to the actress Izumi Aki, who has appeared in his films.

Many of his films are urban love stories.
