= Naoyuki Tomomatsu =

Japanese film director and screenwriter (born 1967)

- Born: 1967 (age 58–59); Osaka, Japan
- Occupations: Film director Screenwriter
- Years active: 1992 –

Naoyuki Tomomatsu (友松 直之, Tomomatsu Naoyuki) (born 1967) is a Japanese film director and screenwriter who has worked in the pink film and horror genres.

== Life and career ==
Tomomatsu was born in Osaka, Japan in 1967. He was interested in manga and film from high school and started working as an office assistant to manga artist Shungicu Uchida. In 1992, he wrote his first screenplay for Shintōhō Eiga's pink film The Pregnant Woman (ザ・妊婦). His first film as a director was the independently produced Summer Color Romance (夏色浪漫, Natsu shoku rōman) in 1992 but he made his debut as a commercial director in 1993 for ENK (ENKプロ) with the film Baraado ni idaka re te (バラードに抱かれて), for which he also wrote the screenplay.

Tomomatsu mixed genres with his pink film-thriller-gangster movie Kogyaru-gui: Oosaka terekura hen (コギャル喰い 大阪テレクラ篇), known in English as Eat the Schoolgirl or Eating Schoolgirls: Osaka Telephone Club, released in Japan March 10, 1997. The film, which Tomomatsu directed and co-wrote, follows two young men working for the yakuza, one of them a telephone-sex addict, the other gets sexual gratification from killing while dressed as a schoolgirl. A reviewer described it as "one depraved sex scene after another". It was also released as a DVD in May 2004.

Tomomatsu is best known internationally for his August 2001 comic-horror zombie film Stacy also known as Stacy: Attack of the Schoolgirl Zombies. With various references to George A. Romero's films, this teen-aged girl zombie work was called "a good effort at expanding a staid subgenre" by AllMovie.

A March 2005 drama, Kiss me or kill me: Todokanakutemo aishiteru (kiss me or kill me 届かなくても愛してる), written and directed by Tomomatsu, starred AV Idol Asami and was produced by Tomomatsu's first employer Shungicu Uchida. Another pink film directed by Tomomatsu, Chikan Densha: Suggestive Indecent Hips (痴漢電車 挑発する淫ら尻, Chikan densha: chōhatsusuru midara shiri), produced by Shintōhō Eiga, won the 3rd place Best Film award at the 2005 Pink Grand Prix ceremony.

In April 2006, he returned to the zombie genre when he directed and co-wrote the V-Cinema horror film, Zombie Self-Defense Force (ゾンビ自衛隊, Zonbi jieitai) featuring AV actress Mihiro. Also in 2006, he directed AV star Sakura Sakurada in the V-Cinema erotic video My Sister's Secret (妹の秘密).

He won a second award at the Pink Grand Prix when his film Female Prisoner Ayaka: Tormenting and Breaking in a Bitch (女囚アヤカ いたぶり牝調教, Joshū Ayaka: itaburi mesu chōkyō) released by OP Eiga won an Honorable Mention for Best Film at the 2008 ceremony. For Maid-Droid, Tomomatsu was named Best Director at the 2009 Pink Grand Prix.

The 2009 production Vampire Girl vs. Frankenstein Girl (吸血少女対少女フランケン, Kyūketsu Shōjo tai Shōjo Furanken) brought together an ensemble of Japanese gore and action talent. Tomomatsu co-directed with Yoshihiro Nishimura, the director of Tokyo Gore Police who also did the special effects for The Machine Girl. The fight choreographer was Taku Sakaguchi who had previously worked with Nishimura on Tokyo Gore Police and Meatball Machine and directed his own Yoroi: Samurai Zombie. The screenplay was written by Tomomatsu and his one-time boss Shungicu Uchida, based on her manga of the same name. The movie had its world premiere as a Centerpiece Presentation at the New York Asian Film Festival on June 26 and opened in Japan August 15, 2009.

In 2011, Tomomatsu directed the V-Cinema science fiction horror film released in Japan as Karei naru erogami-ke no ichizoku: Shinsō reijō wa denki shitsuji no yume o miru ka (華麗なるエロ神家の一族 -深窓令嬢は電気執事の夢をみるか-) and internationally with English subtitles as Erotibot in September 2011. The work, starring three AV actresses, Mahiro Aine, Maria Ozawa and Asami, had its European premier at the 12th Japan Film Fest Hamburg in May 2011. In 2012 he released Rape Zombie: Lust of the Dead and began casting extras for a sequel.

== Awards ==
=== Pink Grand Prix ===
- 2005 3rd place: Chikan Densha: Suggestive Indecent Hips (痴漢電車 挑発する淫ら尻, Chikan densha: chōhatsusuru midara shiri)
- 2008: Honorable mention: Female Prisoner Ayaka: Tormenting and Breaking in a Bitch (女囚アヤカ いたぶり牝調教, Joshū Ayaka: itaburi mesu chōkyō)
- 2009: 2nd place Maid-Droid as Rōjin to Rabudōru: Watashi ga Shochō ni Natta Toki (老人とラブドール 私が初潮になった時; lit. The Old Man and the Love Doll: The Time of My First Period) (Tomomatsu was named Best Director for this film)
- 2009: 3rd place: Waisetsu Seirakuen: Ojisama to Watashi (わいせつ性楽園 おじさまと私)

Awards and achievements
Pink Grand Prix
Preceded by Yutaka Ikejima for Chō Inran: Yarebayaruhodo Iikimochi	Pink Grand Prix for Best Director; Naoyuki Tomomatsu; 2009 for Maid-Droid	Succeeded by To be announced
