= Helldriver =

- Film poster

Japanese name
- Kanji: ヘルドライバー
Transcriptions
- Revised Hepburn: Herudoraibā
- Directed by: Yoshihiro Nishimura
- Written by: Yoshihiro Nishimura; Daichi Nagisa; Takeshi Furusawa; Sayako Nakoshi
- Produced by: Yoshinori Chiba; Hiroyuki Yamada
- Starring: Yumiko Hara; Eihi Shiina; Yurei Yanagi; Kazuki Namioka
- Cinematography: Shu G. Momose
- Edited by: Yoshihiro Nishimura
- Music by: Go Nakagawa
- Distributed by: Nikkatsu
- Release dates: September 28, 2010 (Austin, Texas); July 23, 2011 (Japan)
- Running time: 117 minutes
- Country: Japan
- Language: Japanese

Helldriver (Japanese: ヘルドライバー, Hepburn: Herudoraibā) is a 2010 Japanese splatter film directed by Yoshihiro Nishimura. It stars Yumiko Hara and Eihi Shiina, and was written by Nishimura and Daichi Nagisa.

== Plot ==
Siblings Rikka and Yasushi, who had turned into insane cannibals, pursue Rikka's daughter Kika, who is on the run with her father. The murderous duo corners and burns Kika's father to death. Suddenly, a meteorite descends and punctures Rikka's torso, destroying her heart. Rikka rips out her daughter's heart and puts it inside her chest. Immediately, an unknown substance encases the two, putting them in cocoon-like states. Black ash emits from Rikka and eventually covers the northern half of Japan, turning people into bloodthirsty zombies. To contain the infection, the government builds a large wall dividing Japan in two, protecting the humans in the south.

One year later, Kika is freed from her cocoon-like state and awakens with an artificial heart inside her chest. Having been dropped off at the wall, she is cornered by several zombies. With a chainsword that shares the power source with her heart, she quickly kills the zombies by severing the horns on their foreheads. Later, Rikka also emerges from the cocoon and is recognized by the zombies as their "queen."

Kika rescues a man named Taku and his mute companion, No-Name. The duo collects the zombies' horns, which can be turned into a drug and sold on the black market. Sometime later, the three are arrested for selling the zombie horns, which also contain a volatile substance.

Prime Minister Hatoda and his supporters protest the killing of zombies, claiming they are still human. The opposing side, led by Justice Minister Osawa, believes the zombies must be wiped out. When Hatoda makes a speech near the wall, Osawa's men destroy part of it, allowing zombies to come through. Before Hatoda is torn apart, he declares that all zombies are, indeed, no longer human. Osawa declares himself the new prime minister. After identifying Rikka as the source of the outbreak, the government releases Kika's group and tasks them with tracking her down.

After crossing the wall, the trio is attacked by someone using decapitated zombie heads as bombs, but a former policeman named Kaito helps them. Shortly after the group finds No-Name's sister Maya being tortured and fed on by Yasushi in a zombie-infested bar. They rescue her and escape, pursued by Yasushi. During the chase, Kika kills the zombified bar owner, and Taku sacrifices himself to force Yasushi's vehicle over a cliff. Maya dies from blood loss.

Kika, Kaito, and No-Name eventually reach Rikka, who controls a giant body made out of zombies. No-Name fires a tracking signal onto Rikka's location, allowing the army to fire missiles at her. The attack backfires, as the giant creature catches two missiles and uses them to fly toward southern Japan. Meanwhile, the breach at the wall is unable to be contained and thousands of zombies have broken through. After being attacked by a zombie, Osawa is killed by his guards.

Kika climbs onto the giant and is confronted by Yasushi, who had survived the crash. After a fight, Kika kicks him into one of the missiles which explodes, veering the giant back to northern Japan. Kika confronts and fights her mother. Eventually, Kika rips out the heart from Rikka's chest and decapitates her. Immediately, all of the zombies fall to the ground dead. As the giant falls apart, No-Name and Kaito save Kika. No longer needing her original heart, Kika crushes it.

During the end credits, the other missile explodes, launching Rikka's severed head into space. It eventually reaches an alien planet and presumably strikes an inhabitant (in the same way the meteorite did to Rikka).

== Cast ==
- Yumiko Hara as Kika Miyata
- Eihi Shiina as Rikka Miyata
- Kazuki Namioka as Kaito
- Yūrei Yanagi as Taku
- Minoru Torihada as President Businessman Prime Minister Hatada
- Kentaro Kishi as Yasushi Miyata
- Gadarukanaru Taka as Justice Minister Osawa The Traitor
- Mizuki Kusumi as Nanashi (No-Name)
- Asami Sugiura as Wall Guard Kozue
- Honoka as Oiran Zombie
- Miyashita Tomomi as Ando Mobster Boss
- Takumi Saito as Hyperpolis Natsuki
- Ishikawa Yuya as Kika's father Mr Miyata
- Saotome Rui as Maya
- Taro Suruga as Member Ishino Mobster
- Hiroyuki Ota as Hyper Police Captain Guard
- Norman England as Annoyed Patron Sushi Customer Man

== Production ==
Director Yoshihiro Nishimura began working on the script to Helldriver in 2009. Nishimura took influence from George A. Romero's film Night of the Living Dead which dealt with current events of the day. Nishimura stated that there was "quite a lot of satire and social criticism in this film...I describe what ensues after the nation splits in two, with humans controlling one half and zombies the other, and the kind of discrimination that would occur within Japan were something severe like this to happen."

On May 15, 2010, Helldriver began filming in an abandoned warehouse in Choshi, Japan. Other scenes involving hordes of zombies were filmed outside Mount Fuji.

== Release ==
Helldriver had its world premiere at Fantastic Fest in Austin, Texas on September 28, 2010. It was also an Official Selection at the Sitges International Fantastic Film Festival in 2010, the Brussels International Fantastic Film Festival in 2011, the Calgary International Film Festival in 2011 and Montreal's Fantasia International Festival in 2011.

The film had its theatrical release in Japan on July 23, 2011. The screening of Helldriver at the New York Japan Society in April 2011 was a benefit in aid for the 2011 Tōhoku earthquake and tsunami.

== Reception ==
Film Business Asia gave the film a six out of ten rating, calling it an "average-to-occasionally-inspired effort" that was not as strong as Nishimura's Tokyo Gore Police but better than Vampire Girl vs Frankenstein Girl. The review went on to say that the film "suffers from the perennial problem with all zombie movies: the creatures have only one way of attacking and the heroes have only one way of killing—which soon becomes repetitive unless there's an interesting story or characters." The Hollywood Reporter gave the film a negative review, stating that "Even for a genre film, the storyline is negligible" and the "action choreography is run-of-the-mill." The review went on to praise the make-up in the film, stating that "Nishimura put tender loving care into image and costume design...Even "walk-ons" have distinct facial features and expressions."
