= Noriko Kijima =

Japanese gravure idol and actress (born 1988)

Noriko Kohara 小原徳子^{?}
- Born: Noriko Kijima きじま のりこ^{?} 木嶋 のりこ^{?} March 22, 1988 (age 38); Nagano Prefecture, Japan
- Other names: のりぞ〜^{?}, のーりー^{?}
- Years active: 2005–present
- Modeling information
- Agency: Pike Planning (パイク・プランニング株式会社)
- Website: http://www.diamondblog.jp/official/norikokijima/

Noriko Kohara (小原徳子, Kohara Noriko; born Noriko Kijima (木嶋 のりこ, Kijima Noriko; March 22, 1988)) is a Japanese gravure idol and actress.

== Life and career ==
Kijima was born in Nagano Prefecture, Japan on March 22, 1988. She was one of the winners at the 2005 Seikore competition, short for Zenkoku Joshikousei Seifuku Collection, a Japanese national contest for girls of high school age to model school uniforms and bikinis. She has since made a number of gravure videos.

In May 2006, at age eighteen, she appeared in Masato Tsujioka's award-winning film Divide. That same year saw her playing a literal "living doll" in the Tetsuya Ikea produced Legend of the Doll. The Crystal Acids reviewer notes "The acting is fairly solid ... with Noriko Kijima proving that she is more than just a pretty face." She also played the role of Yoshie, Ami's best friend, in Noboru Iguchi's 2008 cult gore film The Machine Girl and was the star of the short direct-to-video sequel Shyness Machine Girl.

Along with actresses Noriko Eguchi and Saori Hara she appeared in the comedy Yuriko's Aroma (ユリ子のアロマ, Yuriko no Aroma), which debuted at the Yubari International Fantastic Film Festival in February 2010 and was released theatrically in May of that same year. At a press conference in January 2012, it was announced that Kijima, along with Rika Sakurai (櫻井里佳) and Miki Ichikawa (市川みき) had taken the Grand Prize as "Miss East Sports 2012" (ミス東スポ2012}. In March 2013, she co-starred with Hiroko Kamata and Maki Fukumi in the lesbian-themed movie Kotatso, Orange and Meow! (こたつと、みかんと、ニャー。, Kotatsu to, Mikan to, Nya.), the title referring to the online "handles" of the three girls who go on a trip to a hot springs.

The July 2014 light S&M comedy with lesbian overtones, The Torture Club, is described by critic Derek Elley as a "star vehicle" for Kijima and as a lead-in for the schoolgirls vs. zombies Z ~Zed~, also released in July 2014.

== Filmography ==
Theatrical releases

- Divide (DIVIDE ディバイド) May 2006
- The Machine Girl (片腕マシンガール The Machine Girl) August 2008
- Pyocotan Profile (ピョコタン・プロファイル) November 2008
- Samurai Princess (サムライプリンセス 外道姫) June 2009
- Yuriko's Aroma (ユリ子のアロマ) February 2010
- Kotatso, Orange and Meow! (こたつと、みかんと、ニャー。, Kotatsu to, Mikan to, Nya.) March 2013
- The Torture Club (ちょっとかわいいアイアンメイデン, Chotto Kawaii Aian Meiden) July 2014
- Z ~Zed~ July 2014
- The Cornered Mouse Dreams of Cheese (TBA)
- Manji (2023)

Direct-to-video (V-Cinema)

- Legend of the Doll (萌えキュン@MOVIE 聖・美少女フィギュア伝) 2006
- Shyness Machine Girl (hajiraiマシンガール) 2009

Television

- Hana Moyu 2015

== DVD appearances ==
Gravure videos.

- Abunai Kyujitsu December 2005 (with Megumi Koga)
- Angel Kiss (June 2006)
- GO!! GO!! Seijun School Five August 2006 (with 4 other models)
- Angel Kiss Norinori Panic 2 September 2006
- Tamayura November 2006 (with Yuki Suzuki)
- Gekisha Vol.20 Noriko Kijima December 2006
- Rinkai March 2007
- Norinori Dream May 2007
- Angel Kiss - Nori Nori Vacances December 2007
- Mitsumeteitai July 2008
- Mitsumetehoshii October 2008
- Yuwaku Temptation November 2008
- Noriko no Michi March 2009
- Sweet Heart July 2010
- Warunori February 2011
- Moso Honey July 2011
- Hadakano Mermaid December 2011
- Eden June 2012
- Kinjirareta Asobi February 2013
