= Norman England (writer) =

American writer and film professional based in Japan (born 1959)

- Born: April 24, 1959 (age 67); San Mateo, California, U.S.
- Occupations: Reporter; journalist; author; screenwriter; set photographer; film subtitler; actor; film director
- Years active: 1998–present
- Spouse: Miyako Cojima

Norman C. England (ノーマン・イングランド, Nōman Ingurando; born April 24, 1959) is an American writer, set photographer, subtitler, actor, and filmmaker based in Japan since the 1990s. He is known for his extensive work documenting and participating in Japanese genre cinema, particularly kaiju and horror films, as well as his independent directing projects and books on Japanese film production.

He is married to horror manga artist Miyako Cojima.

== Early life and New York years (1959–1990s) ==
Norman C. England was born on April 24, 1959, in San Mateo, California. He and his siblings spent theirformative years in the New York metropolitan area, growing up in Rockland County, approximately 40 minutes from New York City. This East Coast upbringing exposed him to a vibrant cultural environment that fostered an early interest in cinema, particularly genre films such as horror and kaiju.

In the late 1970s, England shifted focus to rock and roll, playing in a popular band in New York City during Japan's "bubble economy." Interactions with Japanese friends rekindled his interest in Godzilla and Japanese pop culture.

== Move to Japan and career (1992–present) ==
In 1991, following his band's breakup, England moved to Tokyo in 1992 or 1993, having learnt how to speak and read day-to-day Japanese language. Initially without a clear plan, he leveraged his English-language skills and passion for cinema. He took on diverse roles in the Japanese film industry, including set and still photography, English subtitling, "making of" videos, scriptwriting, PR writing, poster catchphrases, set reporting, acting, and directing. He has attributed this versatility to a desire to avoid boredom and comprehensively learn filmmaking. By his own estimate, he spent nearly 200 days on various film sets.

After working on a George A. Romero-directed live-action commercial for Resident Evil 2 (1998) due to his expertise as its Japanese production company hired him as he was a widely known a "Romero expert", he established himself by securing a journist career with horror magazine Fangoria and becoming its corrispding reporter in Japan. His first major set was Gamera 3: Revenge of Iris (1999), directed by Shusuke Kaneko, where England appeared as an uncredited extra in the Kyoto Station battle. He quickly befriended Kaneko and became deeply involved in kaiju productions throughout the early 2000s. Soon after, he worked on Godzilla 2000: Millennium (1999), with another uncredited cameo running in a yellow Hawaiian Star Wars shirt.

England immersed himself particularly in Kaneko's Godzilla, Mothra and King Ghidorah: Giant Monsters All-Out Attack (GMK, 2001), visiting four times a week for nearly six months. He took around 25,000 photos, kept a detailed diary, and reported monthly for Kaneko's and Toho's Godzilla website on its production, and subsequently wrote reports. He also contributed to Godzilla vs. Megaguirus (2000), Godzilla Against Mechagodzilla (2002), Godzilla: Tokyo SOS (2003), and Godzilla Final Wars (2004), as well as Gamera the Brave (2006).

During the J-horror boom, England reported extensively for Fangoria (material equivalent to seven or eight issues), Sci-Fi Teen, and The Japan Times. He visited sets such as Ju-on 2 (2000) and worked on films like Stacy: Attack of the Schoolgirl Zombies (2001). He interviewed directors including Kaneko, Takashi Shimizu, Hideo Nakata, and Nobuhiko Obayashi, as well as producers like Shogo Tomiyama.

As a director, England made The iDol (2006), the kaiju documentary Bringing Godzilla Down to Size (2008), and the semi-feature New Neighbor (2013). His acting credits include roles in kaiju films, Death Note (2006), The ABCs of Death (2012), and tokusatsu television. He learned Japanese set culture on the job, noting its hierarchy, respect for directors (kantoku), dedication to practical effects, and occasional challenges with ego.

Since around 2008, subtitling has been his primary work. He specializes in horror dialogue and often consults directors for nuance. Credits include Vampire Girl vs. Frankenstein Girl (2009), and Takashi Miike's The Great Yokai War: Guardians (2021).

== Filmography ==
=== Director/screenwriter ===
- The iDol (2006)
- Bringing Godzilla Down to Size (2008)
- New Neighbor (2013)

=== Acting ===
- Gamera 3: Revenge of Iris (1999) as a running man at Kyoto Station (extra)
- Godzilla 2000 (1999) as a running man in a yellow Hawaiian Star Wars shirt
- Pyrokinesis (2000) as restaurant patron
- Stacy: Attack of the Schoolgirl Zombies (2001) as Jeff
- Godzilla: Tokyo S.O.S. (2003) as a U.S. military officer
- Death Note (2006) as an FBI agent
- Ultraseven X (TV 2007)
- Tokyo Gore Police (2008)
- Helldriver (2010)
- The Great Buddha Arrival (2018) as an American newscaster
- Nezura 1964 (2020)

== Selected bibliography ==
- Behind the Kaiju Curtain: A Journey Onto Japan's Biggest Film Sets (2021)
- Ring of Fear: Dispatches from the Trenches of Japanese Genre Film Sets (2023)
