= Shyness Machine Girl =

- DVD cover
- Directed by: Noboru Iguchi
- Written by: Noboru Iguchi
- Produced by: Yoshinori Chiba; Yoko Hayama; Kazuto Morita
- Starring: Noriko Kijima; Yūya Ishikawa; Demo Tanaka; Kentarō Kishi; Hiroaki Murakami; Yukihide Benny; Takatoshi Naoi; Masahiro Aoki
- Cinematography: Yoshihiro Nishimura
- Edited by: Takeshi Wada
- Music by: Kou Nakagawa
- Distributed by: Fever Dreams
- Release date: January 23, 2009 (Japan)
- Running time: 22 minutes
- Country: Japan
- Language: Japanese

Shyness Machine Girl (Japanese: hajiraiマシンガール, Hepburn: Hajirai mashin gāru) was released January 23, 2009 in Japan as part of the Japanese DVD release for The Machine Girl. It is a brief side-story or gaiden to The Machine Girl rather than a direct sequel. This version stars gravure idol Noriko Kijima as Yoshie, who has not only a machine-gun arm but another gun which extends from her lower anatomy.

== Synopsis ==
Yoshie's friend, Ami Hyūga, was murdered and desecrated by the Kimura Gang (in the first movie). She was saved and, like Ami in the previous film, received modifications from the same mechanics. Remembering her past, Yoshie decides to avenge herself and Ami.

== Cast ==
- Noriko Kijima as Yoshie
- Minase Yashiro as Ami Hyūga (flashback sequences) (archive footage)
- Asami Miyajima as Miki Sugihara (as Asami Sugiura)
- Hiroaki Murakami
- Yūya Ishikawa as Suguru Sugihara
- Demo Tanaka as Kaneko/Kimura gang member
- Kentarō Kishi as Yōsuke Fujii
- Yukihide Benny (as Yukihide Benii)
- Kentarō Shimazu as Ryūji Kimura/Kimura gang boss
- Takatoshi Naoi
- Masahiro Aoki
