= Eihi Shiina =

Japanese fashion model and actor (born 1976)

- 椎名英姫
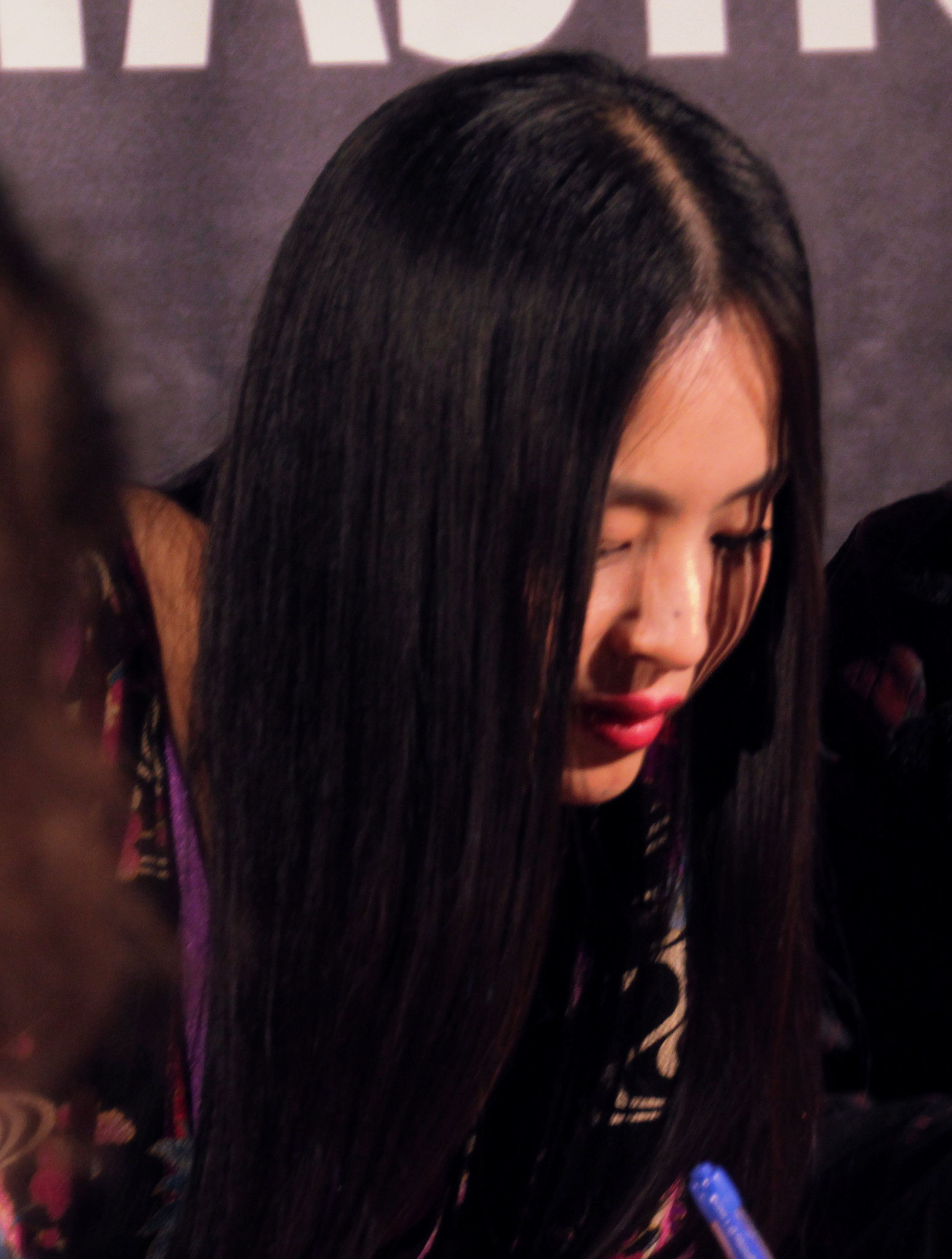
- Shiina in 2015
- Born: February 3, 1976 (age 50); Fukuoka, Japan
- Years active: 1995–present

Eihi Shiina (椎名英姫, Shiina Eihi; born February 3, 1976) is a Japanese fashion model and actress from Fukuoka, Japan. She got her first big break in 1995, working for Benetton, after which she represented Japan at the global Elite Model Look '95, then continuing as a magazine model.

Shiina made her film debut in 1998 with Open House. She also published a book of photographs and poems, entitled No Filter, Only Eyes, that same year. She is recognized internationally for her role as Asami Yamazaki in Takashi Miike's Audition, and as the vengeful police officer Ruka in Yoshihiro Nishimura's Tokyo Gore Police.

== Filmography ==
- Audition (オーディション) (1999) as Asami Yamazaki (山崎麻美)
- Eureka (2000) as Keiko Kōno
- Harmful Insect (害虫) as Music Teacher (2002)
- A Day on the Planet (2003) as Yamada's Lover
- Sky High (2003) (TV) as Izuko
- Jam Films 2: Fastener (2004) as Actress
- Animusu anima (2005) as Sui
- Tokyo Gore Police (2008) as Ruka
- Vampire Girl vs. Frankenstein Girl (2009) as Monami's mother
- Outrage (2010) as Jun
- Helldriver (2010) as Rikka
- The Profane Exhibit (segment: The Hell Chef) (2013) as The Hell Chef
- Use the Eyeballs! (2015)
- The Ninja War of Torakage (2015) as Gensai Shinonome
- Kazoku Gokko (2015)
- Kodoku Meatball Machine (2017)
