= Oira Sukeban =

Japanese manga created by Go Nagai in 1974

- Cover of Oira Sukeban #7 (1976) published by Shogakukan.

おいら女蛮
- Genre: Comedy
- Manga
- Written by: Go Nagai
- Published by: Shogakukan
- Magazine: Weekly Shōnen Sunday
- Original run: August 4, 1974 – January 25, 1976
- Volumes: 7
- Live-action film

Oira Sukeban: Kessen! Pansutō
- Directed by: Teruyoshi Ishii
- Produced by: Tsuburaya Eizō
- Written by: Masaki Tsuji
- Music by: Yoshihiro Kunimoto; Go Nagai (song lyrics)
- Studio: Taki Corporation
- Released: July 24, 1992
- Runtime: 72 minutes
- Original video animation
- Directed by: Yūsaku Saotome
- Written by: Go Nagai
- Studio: Studio Signal Club
- Licensed by: NA: ADV Films
- Released: August 21, 1992
- Runtime: 43 minutes
- Live-action film
- Directed by: Noboru Iguchi
- Produced by: Yukihiko Yamaguchi; Masaki Takemura; Hiroyuki Yamada
- Written by: Noboru Iguchi
- Music by: Masako Ishii
- Studio: King Records
- Licensed by: NA: Discotek Media
- Released: February 4, 2006
- Runtime: 62 minutes

Oira Sukeban (Japanese: おいら女蛮; "I'm Sukeban"), sometimes called Sukeban Boy, is a Japanese manga written and illustrated by Go Nagai, serialized in Shogakukan's Weekly Shōnen Sunday from 1974 to 1976. It is a comedy with several erotic touches, where the protagonist Banji Suke (or Sukeban) is accidentally enrolled in a new school as a girl, and he goes along with the farce. He intends it to only be temporary, but he accidentally commits to a long-term deception. As Sukeban is a rebellious boy, this situation creates several comedic troubles.

The manga was adapted to an OVA in 1992, and was released by ADV Films in the US under the name Delinquent in Drag. This OVA changed the premise to him deliberately pretending to be a girl to attend an all-female school.

It has also spawned two live-action movies, Oira Sukeban: Kessen! Pansutō (おいら女蛮 決戦!パンス党) in 1992 starring actor Shinji Takeda, and Oira Sukeban (called mostly Sukeban Boy) in 2006 starring AV idol Asami (亜紗美).

== Staff of Oira Sukeban: Kessen! Pansutō (1992) ==
- Studio: Taki Corporation
- Director: Teruyoshi Ishii
- Original work: Go Nagai
- Writer: Masaki Tsuji
- Music: Yoshihiro Kunimoto
- Producer: Tsuburaya Eizō
- Song lyrics: Go Nagai
- Cast: Shinji Takeda, Kazuyo Harada, Keiko Hirota, Keiko Hata, Yoshikatsu Fujimoto, Shingo Kazami, Go Nagai, Daijirō Harada, Kuma Leonard, Rie Asai, Yuka Watanabe

== Staff of Oira Sukeban (Sukeban Boy) (2006) ==
- Studio: King Records
- Director: Noboru Iguchi
- Producer: Yukihiko Yamaguchi, Masaki Takemura, Hiroyuki Yamada
- Original work: Go Nagai
- Writer: Noboru Iguchi
- Cinematography: Yasutaka Nagano
- Special makeup: Yoshihiro Nishimura
- Art: Shinpei Inoe
- Music: Masako Ishii
- Illumination: Reiji Ōkubo
- Cast: Asami, Emiru Momose, Saori Matsunaka, Shizuka Itō, Demo Tanaka, Chisa Imai, Shō Sawamura, Kaori, Miwa, Kentarō Kishi, Hiroaki Murakami, Beat Arima, Atsuko Miura, Kōichi Ōbori
