= Raiga =

Raiga can refer to:

- Raiga Fujimura from Fate
- Raiga Kurosuku from Naruto
- Raiga From Raiga: The Monster From The Deep Sea (2009 Japan and 2020 America)
