= Yukie Kawamura =

Japanese gravure idol and actress (born 1986)

- Born: Yukie Kawamura (川村 雪絵); January 23, 1986 (age 40); Otaru, Hokkaidō, Japan
- Other name: Yukkī
- Occupations: gravure idol; tarento; actress
- Years active: 2003–present
- Height: 1.58 m (5 ft 2 in)
- Spouse: Hisashi Kurihara (m. 2019)
- Children: 1
- Website: http://www.yukie-kawamura.com/

Yukie Kawamura (川村 ゆきえ, Kawamura Yukie; born January 23, 1986) is a Japanese gravure idol, tarento, and actress signed to Japan Art.

== Biography ==
Born in Otaru, Hokkaidō, Kawamura grew up in Yokohama, Kanagawa and later in Abiko, Chiba. She made her debut in 2003 as a gravure idol. In 2006 she started her career as an actress. On November 22, 2019, Kawamura announced that she married Back Number drummer, Hisashi Kurihara. On November 20, 2021, Kawamura announced on her Twitter account that she had given birth to her first child.

== Filmography ==
=== Films ===
- Kikyū Club, Sono go (気球クラブ、その後) (2006)
- A Slit-Mouthed Woman 2 (口裂け女2) (2008)
- Vampire Girl vs. Frankenstein Girl (吸血少女対少女フランケン) (2009)
- Creepy Hide and Seek (ひとりかくれんぼ 劇場版) (2009)
- Battle of Demons (2009)
- Finding the Adolescence (思春期ごっこ) (2014)
- Hōzuki-san Chi no Aneki (2014)
- Inemuri Iwane (2019)

=== TV dramas ===
- Donto Hare (2007)
- Juken Sentai Gekiranger as Cherry (2007, episode 36)
- Ultraseven X (2007)
- Mirai Seiki Shakespeare (2008)
