= Z: Zed =

Japanese manga series

Z～ゼット～
- Genre: Horror
- Manga
- Written by: Koji Aihara
- Published by: Nihon Bungeisha
- Imprint: Seinen
- Magazine: Bessatsu Manga Goraku
- Original run: April 2013 – present
- Volumes: 2
- Live-action film
- Directed by: Norio Tsuruta
- Released: July 26, 2014
- Runtime: 109 minutes

Z: Zed (Z～ゼット～) is a Japanese zombie horror manga series created by Koji Aihara. It was serialized in Bessatsu Manga Goraku magazine by Nihon Bungeisha. The first volume was published in April 2013. It was adapted into a live action film in 2014 directed by Norio Tsuruta.

== Film cast ==
- Mayu Kawamoto
- Noriko Kijima
- Miharu Tanaka
