= Chō Kuse ni Narisō =

Japanese anime television series

- Cover art for the fourth and final volume of the Chō Kuse ni Narisō manga released in Japan

超くせになりそう (Chō Kuse ni Narisō)
- Genre: Romantic comedy
- Manga
- Written by: An Yoshimura
- Illustrated by: Yayoi Nakano
- Published by: Kodansha
- Magazine: Nakayoshi
- Original run: July 1993 – January 1995
- Volumes: 4
- Anime television series
- Directed by: Tetsuya Endo
- Produced by: Yoshikazu Tochihira
- Written by: Meteor Shower
- Music by: Hiroshi Sakamoto
- Studio: Studio Kikan
- Original network: NHK
- Original run: 5 April 1994 – 3 January 1995
- Episodes: 39

Chō Kuse ni Narisō (超くせになりそう; lit. '막걸리색 정액", "I'll Make a Habit of It') is a Japanese manga series written by An Yoshimura and illustrated by Nakano Yayoi. The series tells the story of an idol singer/martial artist and the chaos that results from her efforts to have a life and love beyond her singing career. An anime adaptation by Studio Kikan aired as part of the anthology program Eisei Anime Gekijō which was broadcast on NHK.

== Synopsis ==
Shiratori Nagisa is the heir to a judo training hall that has fallen on such hard times that their only pupils are animals from a nearby wildlife park. In a desperate bit to save her heritage, she reveals that she is going to go out into the world as an idol singer and find "strong people" to join her school. The first part of her plan succeeds beyond her wildest dreams: she is elevated to the status of Japan's top idol. Yet this dooms the second part of her plan, because her fame and schedule prevent her from finding the disciples she seeks.

So Nagisa horrifies her manager by chopping off her trademark pigtails and enrolling at one of the worst schools in Tokyo as a boy, under her given name of Ootori Nagisa. (Shiratori is a stage name). There, she runs into the toughest gang at the school, and after she soundly beats them, they (believing her to be a man) recruit her to help them confront a gang from a rival school. When she sees the leader of the rival gang, a handsome boy named Nosaka-kun, she instantly falls madly in love with him. Before the fight can begin, Nagisa is whisked away to a record signing, where she encounters Nosaka again, who is so utterly smitten with Nagisa that he proposes marriage on the spot.

The next day, the disguised Nagisa fights an inconclusive duel with Nosaka that ends in a stalemate, and with Nosaka declaring her a worthy foe who he looks forward to fighting again. He later reveals to the female Nagisa that he too in on a quest to recruit disciples for a failing dojo, and is meeting with a similar lack of success. The next day, in their final confrontation, Nosaka discovers Nagisa's secret due to an ill-placed grab maneuver. Declaring he would rather love Nagisa than fight her, he agrees to keep her secret and they run off, with the school toughs and both their disapproving fathers in hot pursuit.

After that, Nagisa continues her double life, showing up at school some of the time when her manager cannot force her to attend to her idol responsibilities. Meanwhile, the world she lives in gets weirder and weirder, as more and more bizarre things happen in her proximity.

== Characters ==
Ootori/Shiratori Nagisa
Voiced by: Chinami Nishimura
Nagisa is the young, pink-pigtailed protagonist of the story. While she loves to sing and dance (and is very good as well) she says that she loves to "toss people around" more. Her strength and fighting ability are overwhelmingly large, and she uses them on both people and the wildlife she trains in her dojo. She is very ambitious and isn't afraid to go after what she wants.
Nosaka Akira
Voiced by: Nobutoshi Hayashi
Nagisa's love interest, confidante and secret fiancé. He is quite devoted but he is impulsive and protective to a fault, despite the fact that Nagisa is in less need of protection than anyone he has ever known.
Momoko Prisilla
Voiced by: Chieko Honda
A wealthy dilettante who is determined to become the greatest actress in the world and supplant Nagisa as the most popular idol in Japan (one of her more "rational" goals is to be more famous than Audrey Hepburn). As part of this process, she is "building a repertoire" of roles she can assume. At least twice an episode, Momoko can be counted upon to show up at a random time, do something incredibly bizarre, and then leave, usually being driven off in her stretch limousine by the young man who adoringly follows her everywhere to the praises of a quartet of identical cheerleaders who might be robots. There are strong hints that she may have the power to literally manipulate and warp reality at will through her method acting.
Kamioka Ryuu
Voiced by: Akira Ishida
As Momoko's stooge, he participates in Momoko's little shows, often finding himself in harm's way as a result. Despite this, he is incredibly loyal to Momoko and does his best to learn from her and her acting.
Kumakichi
A large blue bear who is one of Nagisa's best friends from her dojo, who now lives with her in Tokyo and occasionally takes part in her act. Contrary to anime-fan expectations, Kumakichi actually is a bear and is usually incapable of speech.
Makoto Nakatake
Voiced by: Kouji Tsujitani
Nagisa's long-suffering manager who fears that her irresponsibility is going to cost him his job. He poses as a teenage boy to enroll with Nagisa at the school so he can keep her under observation, a task that usually proves futile. Even though he continues to remain in the idol agency's employ, he continues to worry about it to extreme lengths, even developing a song of his own called "The Worry Blues" as a running gag.
Tsunoda
The leader of the hoodlums at Nagisa's school, an ardent fan of Nagisa the idol singer, and a combination friend and antagonist for Nagisa the martial artist. He is bald, with a head shaped like a volcano that erupts on occasion, as a result of a childhood accident. Despite his rough appearance and speech, he is from a rich family and is surprisingly intelligent and resourceful. He is completely unable to decipher Nagisa's secret despite the fact that she does a poor job of impersonating a male. As a result of this, he completely misinterprets her relationship with his bitter rival Nosaka. Like Nosaka, he is very protective of Shiratori Nagisa and will attempt to charge to the rescue if he believes she is in danger.
Red Beetle
An international agency/conspiracy that keeps an iron grip on the market for idols on every nation on Earth except Japan. They frequently send rivals forth to break Nagisa's grip on the hearts of the Japanese public, who always fail despite Nagisa's lack of interest in defending her position on top.

== Episodes ==
No.	Original title	Original title (Romaji)	Subtitled title(s)	Aired
01	誕生！戦うアイドル？！	Tanjou! Tatakau Idol?!	Tomodachi Fansubs: Born! Fighting Idol?!	05/04/1994
02	決闘！恋のカミナリおとし	Kettou! Koi no Kaminari Otoshi	Tomodachi Fansubs: Duel! Thunder of Love	12/04/1994
03	なぎさのデート！	Nagisa no Date!	Tomodachi Fansubs: Nagisa's Date!	19/04/1994
04	まいりますわよ仇討ち！	Mairimasuwayo Kataki Uchi!	Tomodachi Fansubs: You might as well give up! The revenge!	26/04/1994
05	その人は中学教師	Sono Hito wa Chuugaku Kyoushi	Tomodachi Fansubs: He is a teacher	03/05/1994
06	美少女軍団はぐれ花	Bishojo Gundan wa Gure Hana	Tomodachi Fansubs: Pretty girl flower group	10/05/1994
07	おねがい恋のキューウピッド！	Onegai Koi no Cupid!	Tomodachi Fansubs: Please, Cupid of Love!	17/05/1994
08	大きな桜の樹の下で	Ookina Sakura no Ki no Shita de	Tomodachi Fansubs: Under the giant cherry tree	24/05/1994
09	美少女軍団乱れ咲き	Bishojo Gundan Midare Zaki	Tomodachi Fansubs: The beautiful girl team is here	31/05/1994
10	激写！これがなぎさだ！	Gekishiya! Kore ga Nagisa da!	Tomodachi Fansubs: Photo! This is Nagisa!	07/06/1994
11	アイドル・オブ・じゃぱん	Idol・Of・Japan	Tomodachi Fansubs: Idol of Japan	14/06/1994
12	アイ・ラブ・ワニサン	I・Love・Wanisan	Tomodachi Fansubs: I love alligators	28/06/1994
13	嗚呼、過ぎ去りし青春の日々	Aa, Sugi Sarishi Seishiyun no Hibi	Tomodachi Fansubs: Ah, my former youth	05/07/1994
14	ユカイ、ゆーかい、香港ギャング！	Yukai, Yuukai, Honkon Gang!	Tomodachi Fansubs: Fun kidnap Hong Kong gang	12/07/1994
15	色つぽいのはお好き？	Irotsupoi no wa Osuki?	Tomodachi Fansubs: Do you like sexy girls?	19/07/1994
16	めざせ！栄光のゴール	Mezase! Eikou no Goal	Tomodachi Fansubs: Go for your goal	26/07/1994
17	ぼくのなぎさ、わたしのなぎさ	Boku no Nagisa, Watashi no Nagisa	Anonymous Russian Soldiers: My Nagisa, No, MY Nagisa	02/08/1994
18	祝開校！聖ジュリアナ学園	Shukukaikou! Sento Juliana Gakuen	Anonymous Russian Soldiers: Grand Opening! St. Juliana Academy	09/08/1994
19	ついに出た！私はモモコ	Tsuini Deta! Watashi wa Momoko	Anonymous Russian Soldiers: Better Late Than Never! I am Momoko!	16/08/1994
20	GOGO！ゴールド	Gogo! Gold	Anonymous Russian Soldiers: Go! Go! Gold!	23/08/1994
21	出た！影武者、わたしはなぎさ？	Deta! Kagemusha, Watashi wa Nagisa?	SierraComix: The Arrival! Doppelganger, am I Nagisa?	30/08/1994
22	嵐の課外授業	Arashi no Kagaijyu Gyou	SierraComix: Lesson of The Storm	06/09/1994
23	泣いて下さいモモコ伝説	Naite Kudasai Momoko Densetsu	SierraComix: Don't Cry Momoko Legend	13/09/1994
24	スター誕生！俺は角田だ！	Star Tanjou! Ore wa Tsunoda da!	--	20/09/1994
25	不思議の国のなぎさ	Fushiki no Kuni no Nagisa	SierraComix: Nagisa in Wonderland	27/09/1994
26	花のお江戸のシンデレラ	Hana no Oedo no Shinderera	SierraComix: Cinderella of the Creek of Flowers	04/10/1994
27	THEムービー・アイドルは もう死んでいる！	The Movie・Idol wa Mou Shindeiru!	SierraComix: The Movie: The Idol is Already Dead!	11/10/1994
28	THEタコヤキ！	The Takoyaki!	SierraComix: The Takoyaki!	18/10/1994
29	コアラマスク・リターンズ	Koala Mask・Returns	--	25/10/1994
30	二人のなぎさ？！	Futari no Nagisa?!	--	01/11/1994
31	愛は虹の彼方に	Ai wa Niji no Kanata ni	--	08/11/1994
32	暗殺指令をあなたに	Ansatsushirei o Anata ni	--	15/11/1994
33	風と共につぶれた（前編）	Kaze to Tomo ni Tsubureta (Zenpen)	--	22/11/1994
34	風と共につぶれた（後編）	Kaze to Tomo ni Tsubureta (Kouhen)	--	29/11/1994
35	ピーターパンシンドローム	Peter Pan Syndrome	--	06/12/1994
36	超世界アイドル伝説 パートタイム1	Chousekai Idol Densetsu Part-time 1	--	13/12/1994
37	超世界アイドル伝説 パートタイム2	Chousekai Idol Densetsu Part-time 2	--	20/12/1994
38	超世界アイドル伝説 パートタイム3	Chousekai Idol Densetsu Part-time 3	--	27/12/1994
39	ラストオブアイドル	Last of Idol	--	03/01/1995

== Music ==
=== Opening ===
Third Love
Sang by Junko Inoue
Lyrics by Ayuko Ishikawa
Composed by Hiroshi Sakamoto

=== Ending ===
Ushinaenaino (I can't lose you)
Sang by Junko Inoue
Lyrics by Ayuko Ishikawa
Composed by Hiroshi Sakamoto

=== Song inserts ===
Chō kuse ni narisō (I'll make a habit)
Sang by Chinami Nakamura
Lyrics by Tetsuya Endo
Composed by Hiroshi Sakamoto
Suki ni nattara saikyō (If You Love Me The Strongest)
Sang by Chinami Nakamura
Lyrics by Tetsuya Endo
Composed by Hiroshi Sakamoto
Nagisa no serenāde
Sang by Chinami Nakamura
Lyrics by Tetsuya Endo
Composed by Hiroshi Sakamoto
Yume no fūsen (Dream Balloons)
Sang by Chinami Nakamura
Lyrics by Tetsuya Endo
Composed by Hiroshi Sakamoto

Albums

All albums were released by King Records.

Chō Kuse Ni Narisō Shiratori Nagisa ON STAGE Released on December 21, 1994, KICA-223 BUY

Chō Kuse Ni Narisō Secret story Released on February 22, 1995, KICA-231 BUY

== Translations ==
As of writing, the anime has 5 notable translations out of Japanese: Catalan, Cantonese, Korean, and English.

These translations go by "L'ídol Nagisa: Com m'agrada, tot això!",「偶像小英雌」,「하빗」 (Habit), 「막걸리색 정액」and "I'll make a habit of it" respectively. The Catalan, Korean and Cantonese translations are dubs, while English has simply been subtitled. The Catalan dub was aired on K3 (Club Super3, now known as SX3) starting on May 4, 2006.

== Physical releases ==
=== Anime releases ===
The anime was released to rent across 10 VHS volumes in groups of 2, starting July 22, 1994, with Volumes 1 and 2. Claims of a Japanese Laserdisc release and a Catalan DVD release by Selecta Visión have been made, but there is no precedent for this. The earlier Korean dub has an exceedingly rare VHS release as well.

At an unknown time, Japanese tapes were also released for purchase, brandishing cases more suited to the series' artwork prints. These releases are exceedingly rare today and is suspected they may have been mail-order only.

The Japanese VHS release was handled by Taki Corporation, later known as Odessa Entertainment.

Japanese VHS content distribution
No.	Featured content	Release date	Listed runtime	Release ID	Notes
1	Episodes 1-4	1994/07/22	95 min.	THC-1609	
2	Episodes 5-8	1994/07/22	95 min.	THC-1610	
3	VHS Rental Commercial; Episodes 9-12	1994/09/22	95 min.	THC-1612	The back artwork contains a misprint. In the middle sample, a photo from episode 13 can be seen. This image appears to have swapped with volume 4.
4	VHS Rental Commercial; Episodes 13-16	1994/09/22	95 min.	THC-1613	As with volume 3, there is a misprint. The middle sample is from episode 9.
5	Episodes 17-20	1994/11/25	95 min.	THC-1618	
6	Episodes 21-24	1994/11/25	95 min.	THC-1619	
7	Episodes 25-28	1995/02/03	95 min.	THC-1628	
8	Episodes 29-32	1995/02/03	95 min.	THC-1629	
9	Episodes 33-36	1995/04/07	95 min.	THC-16331	
10	Pilot Episode; Episodes 37-39	1995/04/07	82 min.	THC-16341	

=== Manga releases ===
The manga was released exclusively in Japanese by Kodansha, with artwork by Nakano Yayoi and story by Yoshimura An. It remains mostly untranslated.

Content in each standalone release, sorted by year.
Release year	Magazine	Series title	Chapter	Standlone release
1992	Nakayoshi Deluxe	かのこ桃組！	--	くせになりそう
1992	Nakayoshi Deluxe	お嬢様になりたい！	--	くせになりそう
1992	Nakayoshi Deluxe	アレルギーがとまらない！	--	超くせになりそう④
1993	Nakayoshi	くせになりそう	1	くせになりそう
1993	Nakayoshi	くせになりそう	2	くせになりそう
1993	Nakayoshi	くせになりそう	3	くせになりそう
1993	Nakayoshi	超くせになりそう	1	超くせになりそう①
1993	Nakayoshi	超くせになりそう	2	超くせになりそう①
1993	Nakayoshi	超くせになりそう	3	超くせになりそう①
1993	Nakayoshi	超くせになりそう	4	超くせになりそう①
1993	Nakayoshi	超くせになりそう	5	超くせになりそう①
1993	Nakayoshi	超くせになりそう	6	超くせになりそう②
1994	Nakayoshi	超くせになりそう	7	超くせになりそう②
1994	Nakayoshi	超くせになりそう	8	超くせになりそう②
1994	Nakayoshi	超くせになりそう	9	超くせになりそう②
1994	Nakayoshi	超くせになりそう	10	超くせになりそう②
1994	Nakayoshi	超くせになりそう	11	超くせになりそう③
1994	Nakayoshi	超くせになりそう	12	超くせになりそう③
1994	Nakayoshi	超くせになりそう	13	超くせになりそう③
1994	RunRun	超くせになりそう	番外編	超くせになりそう③
1994	Nakayoshi	超くせになりそう	14	超くせになりそう③
1994	Nakayoshi	超くせになりそう	15	超くせになりそう④
1994	Nakayoshi	超くせになりそう	16	超くせになりそう④
1994	Nakayoshi	超くせになりそう	17	超くせになりそう④
1994	Nakayoshi	超くせになりそう	18	超くせになりそう④
1995	Nakayoshi	超くせになりそう	19	超くせになりそう④
