= Minase Yashiro =

Japanese gravure idol and actress

- Born: February 3, 1985 (age 41); Gifu Prefecture, Japan
- Years active: 2006–present
- Height: 1.65 m (5 ft 5 in)
- Website: https://plaza.rakuten.co.jp/yashiro0minase/

Minase Yashiro (八代みなせ, Yashiro Minase born February 3, 1985) is a Japanese gravure idol, actress and TV personality.

== Life and career ==
Minase Yashiro was born on February 3, 1985, in Gifu Prefecture, Japan. She debuted as a gravure (swimsuit) model in 2006, releasing her first DVD MINASE Minakuru! February 17, 2006 just after her 21st birthday, and by mid-2009 she had issued 10 solo DVDs.

Yashiro has appeared on several TV programs including Sports eye ESPN on SkyPerfecTV, Idol Star (アイドルの星) on ENTA!371, Pao Pao on BS NHK, Sabadol! (サバドル!) on TV Tokyo and Ranking Kingdom (ランク王国) from TBS. More recently, she also was on the TBS show Beach Angels filmed in Okinawa. In addition, she has been featured in such magazines as Weekly Young Jump, Flash Exciting, Monthly Gon and Weekly Asahi Geinō.

In 2007 Yashiro was selected as one of the three winners of the Sanyo Image Girl "Marin-chan o Sagase!" ("Search for Marine-chan!") contest. The three models are the third generation of the "Miss Marine-Chan" (ミスマリンちゃん, Misu marin-chan) character used for advertising for the Sanyo Bussan company which makes "pachinko" and slot machines. They are also featured in a photo book Miss Marine-chan Umi Monogatari.

Yashiro made her film debut in Noboru Iguchi's gore-fest The Machine Girl in 2008 playing the lead role of Ami, the girl who goes on a revenge spree with a machine gun for a left arm. The movie was released theatrically and on DVD in both Japan and the United States. According to the Nippon Cinema reviewer, "she plays Ami with 100% conviction - and that really helps sell some of the funny lines she has to deliver with a snarl". In 2010, Yashiro appeared in Kamen Rider Double Forever: A to Z/The Gaia Memories of Fate as one of the antagonists, Reika Hanehara the Heat Dopant. She reprised her role as Reika Hanehara in the 2011 V-Cinema spinoff Kamen Rider W Returns: Kamen Rider Eternal. In 2018, Yashiro appeared in Kamen Rider Zi-O as Kaoru Kinoshita.

== DVD appearances ==
DVD listing sources:

- MINASE Minakuru! (みなくるっ) February 2006
- Positive (タオ) May 2006
- Shangrila (竹書房) August 2006
- Afternoon Breeze (そよ風の中で) December 2006
- Doushitemo... (どうしても・・・) May 2007
- Idol One: Shi, a, wa, se! (アイドル・ワン 八代みなせ / し・あ・わ・せ!) July 2007
- Minan Chu (みなんChu) October 2007
- Minasa Biyori (みなせ日和) February 2008
- With (WITH -ウィズ-) January 2009
- Pavilion (PAVILION) June 2009

== Sources ==
- "Minase Yashiro at IMdB". IMDb.
- "Official Blog" (in Japanese). Archived from the original on 2013-06-02.
- "八代みなせ (Minase Yashiro at SpySee)" (in Japanese). Archived from the original on 2009-08-20.
- "八代みなせ(やしろみなせ) (Minase Yashiro at DMM)" (in Japanese).
- "八代みなせ（女優・タレント・モデル） (Minase Yashiro at Yahoo! Japan" (in Japanese). Archived from the original on 2011-07-22.
