= Cat Eyed Boy =

Japanese manga series

- The cover of the first tankōbon volume, featuring the protagonist

猫目小僧 (Nekome Kozō)
- Genre: Dark fantasy; Thriller
- Manga
- Written by: Kazuo Umezu
- Published by: Shōnen Gahōsha (1969); Shogakukan (1976, 1991, 2006); Asahi Sonorama (1982, 1986)
- English publisher: NA: Viz Media
- Magazine: Shōnen Gaho (1967–1968); Shōnen King (1968–1969); Weekly Shōnen Sunday (1976)
- Original run: December 1967 – 1976
- Anime television series

Yōkaiden Nekome Kozō
- Directed by: Keinosuke Shiyano
- Written by: Yuji Amemiya
- Music by: Masahiko Nishiyama
- Studio: Wako Productions
- Original network: Tokyo Channel 12
- Original run: April 1, 1976 – September 30, 1976
- Episodes: 22
- Live-action film
- Directed by: Noboru Iguchi
- Produced by: Tomoyuki Imai
- Written by: Mana Yasuda
- Music by: Takashi Nakagawa
- Studio: Art Port
- Released: June 10, 2006
- Runtime: 104 minutes

Cat Eyed Boy (Japanese: 猫目小僧, Hepburn: Nekome Kozō) is a Japanese manga series written and illustrated by Kazuo Umezu. The story is narrated by the titular cat-eyed boy, hated by both humans and demons, who gets involved in tales of horror including monsters and children. The manga was initially serialized in 1967 in Shōnen Gahōsha's shōnen manga magazine Shōnen Gaho and eventually two other magazines, and has been compiled and published several times in different formats. In 2008, Viz Media licensed and released the manga in North America in two omnibus volumes. The manga has also been adapted into an anime series in 1976 and a live-action film in 2006. The manga has been noted for Umezu's grotesque style of Japanese horror storytelling and art. Response to the design of the Viz edition has also been positive.

== Plot ==
Cat Eyed Boy revolves around the unnamed titular character, a monster born to a nekomata in the mountains, only to be abandoned by them for being too similar to a human. After disaster strikes his childhood village despite his attempts to save it, he becomes a wanderer. Each chapter tends to follow a pattern wherein the boy visits a new location and moves into the attic of a human family, only for the family to be plagued by a supernatural threat. Despite often using his own supernatural abilities to oppose the violent monsters he encounters, the boy is invariably blamed by humans for the mysterious happenings.

Stuck between two extremes and unable to fit in with either, the boy's main companions end up being cats, with whom he can communicate. Although he possesses many unusual abilities, such as regeneration and illusions, he is often outmatched by the more bloodthirsty monsters he encounters and forced to escape using trickery. Although he tries to warn and assist humans, he is a morally gray character that takes great pride in his status as a monster, even if other ones despise him, as seen in the Band of One Hundred Monsters arc. He has no qualms about seeing unpleasant and evil people punished, and sometimes even sides with supernatural beings when they target someone he dislikes.

== Release ==
The manga was first serialized in Shōnen Gahōsha manga magazine Shōnen Gaho from December 1967 to May 1968 for the stories "The Immortal Man" and "The Ugly Demon". Five more stories until "The Thousand-Handed Demon" were serialized in Shōnen Gahōsha's Shōnen King until 1969. The series was continued in Shogakukan's Weekly Shōnen Sunday for four more stories in 1976.

The chapters of the manga were first compiled together by Shōnen Gahōsha into three volumes starting in 1969. After that, Shogakukan published five volumes of the manga in 1976 under its imprint Shonen Sunday Comics. The third publisher, Asahi Sonorama, published five volumes of the manga in 1982 under its Sun Comics imprint as well. Asahi Sonorama then republished three volumes of the manga in 1986 under its Sun Wide Comics imprint. Shogakukan republished the manga in 1991. Because of the release of the 2006 film adaption of the manga, Shogakukan republished the manga as two large volumes on June 16, 2006.

In January 2008, Viz Media listed two volumes of the manga on the online retailer Amazon.com with page counts corresponding to the 2006 Shogakukan two-volume edition. The 2 volumes were subsequently released in June 2008 under its Viz Signature imprint. The design of the manga as well as its size in dimensions and length have been complimented by reviewers. Veronica Casson, the designer for the Viz edition of the manga, noted that unlike many of her previous titles, she was given freedom to design the book without adhering to the original Japanese version. In an interview with Alvin Lu, the Vice President of Viz Media, Lu stated that Viz focused on presenting the content of the book as much as possible which influenced the decision to release omnibus editions as well as the cover design.

During their panel at New York Comic Con 2022, Viz Media announced that they are releasing a deluxe hardcover edition of the manga, with the first volume releasing on August 22, 2023.

== Analysis and themes ==
=== Social criticism and hypocrisy ===
A central theme in Cat Eyed Boy is social criticism, specifically targeting prejudice and hypocrisy within Japanese society. Umezu stated he "filled the series with criticism (fūshi), making fun of how in human society people suffer bias based on their looks." The narrative often reveals the "ugly moral interior" of characters who present a veneer of respectability or perfection. The horror in the stories frequently stems from a character's realization of their own complicity or flawed, prejudiced nature, with the reader witnessing their "exquisitely painful anguish." The series critiques societal norms by showing that "even beautiful young boys and pretty young girls are capable of great ugliness" and hypocrisy.

=== The liminal observer ===
The titular Cat Eyed Boy, a half-feline, half-human outcast, functions less as a conventional protagonist and more as an observer or narrator who discovers horror. He often takes residence in the attics of family homes, looking down on the human drama below. As a liminal figure rejected by both the human and yōkai (monster) worlds, he is uniquely positioned to critique both. His primary role is to witness the "darkly human tragedies" and occasionally intervene, though often with a sense of emotional distance or genre obligation rather than pure altruism. Scholar Jon Holt describes him as a "discoverer of horror" whose power is "seeing something unknown, something to be feared."

=== Visual style and narrative technique ===
Umezu's visual style in Cat Eyed Boy is noted for its psychologically intense focus on characters' eyes. Jon Holt argues that Umezu synthesized techniques from shōjo (girls') manga and horror manga, using tight close-up panels on characters' eyes to convey a deep interiority, a technique common in shōjo manga, combined with expressions of fear, disgust, or shock. These eye close-ups are often drawn from oblique angles, suggesting a complex and tortured inner state.

Umezu uses these panels to slow down the narrative and intensify a character's moment of psychological horror or self-realization. Katō Mikirō describes the "eye flares" in Umezu's characters as creating an "extreme slow-motion effect" that disjoins action, focusing the reader on a moment of explosive internal realization. Holt analyzes these sequences using Scott McCloud's taxonomy of panel transitions, arguing that Umezu's eye panels often function simultaneously as both "subject-to-subject" and "aspect-to-aspect" transitions, creating a sophisticated narrative rhythm that emphasizes mood and internal crisis. This contrasts with scholar Akihiko Takahashi's proposal that Umezu's style requires a new, seventh "iterative" (hanpuku) type of panel transition to describe its slow, nuanced focus on mental states.

The visual style evolves between the late 1960s and 1976 stories. The earlier stories prominently feature these introspective eye close-ups to reveal a character's "physiological" or "psychological" fear. In the later 1976 stories, such as "The Stairs", Umezu employs a more dispassionate, distant perspective, which scholar Yūichirō Kurihara notes aligns with a shift toward themes of "delusion and karma" and reflects a greater interest in "societal fear" (shakaiteki na kyōfu).

== Adaptations ==
=== Anime ===
In 1976, the manga was adapted into an anime series called Yōkaiden Nekome Kozō (妖怪伝 猫目小僧, "Ghost Story: Cat Eyed Boy"). The anime was produced by Wako Productions and Tokyo Channel 12. The series contained 22 episodes of 15 minutes each.

=== Live-action film ===
Daiei Film once attempted to produce a live-action adaptation of the manga after the 1968 film The Snake Girl and the Silver-Haired Witch based on another manga by Umezu, however the Cat Eyed Boy project was eventually cancelled due to the financial problems of the company.

In 2006, Noboru Iguchi directed a live-action film adaption of the anime. The movie, with gravure idol Miku Ishida, Asami Kumakiri, Hiromasa Taguchi, Naoto Takenaka and Kanji Tsuda, was released theatrically in Japan in June 2006, and on DVD in October of the same year.

== Reception ==
Response to the manga has been positive overall, with critics applauding Umezu's grotesque style of horror, but also recognizing its similarities to low-budget horror of the past. Critics have likened the manga to pulp horror and to the television series Tales from the Crypt, but also acknowledged its divergences such as the focus on the narrator himself. The art has been complimented for creating a dark atmosphere, as well as for Umezu's imaginative monsters. Critics have also noted that the manga will likely be more appealing to audiences interested in manga classics rather than modern horror fans. Opinions on the effectiveness of the short and long stories has been mixed.

Carlo Santos of Anime News Network criticized the similarities of the stories to B-horror movies as well as the weakness of the shorter monster-based stories, but commended Umezu's ability to "create a chilling portrait of the human soul". Shaenon K. Garrity of Anime News Network enjoyed the range of monsters Umezu created and commended the longer stories. Otaku USA's Joseph Luster highly recommended it while calling it an "impeccable classic" based on Umezu's thoughtful storytelling and the horror elements. Greg McElhatton of Comic Book Resources liked how the manga broke from its horror anthology mold by involving the protagonist and deviating from the traditional sense of justice for the good. Connie C. of Comic Book Resources praised Umezu's ability to set a horror mood as well as his art, but felt mixed about his bizarre ideas which she thought were better suited to his shorter stories. Ain't It Cool News categorized the manga as an example of Japanese horror and called it "a chilling concoction of dark vignettes with the macabre, the grotesque and the absurd", despite Umezu's weaker storytelling at the beginning. Manga Bookshelf interpreted Umezu's goal with the manga as wanting to create a hallucinatory atmosphere devoid of logic and enjoyed the origin story of the cat eyed boy, while criticizing the story "The Band of One Hundred Monsters". IGN remarked that the humor in the manga set it apart from Umezu's more serious works such as The Drifting Classroom and that the longer stories were harder to read through. Comics Village also categorized the manga as Japanese horror and noted that the Viz release will appeal more to collectors. It also acknowledged the dated style of the artwork, but said that the story has "timeless qualities". Describing the type of horror in Cat Eyed Boy, Graphic Novel Reporter called it strange and creepy "...in the sense that the pictures are more likely to momentarily unsettle your stomach than keep you up at night." It also complimented Umezu's imagery. ComicBooksBin enjoyed Umezu's approach to horror where he eschews logic, contrasting it with American horror. It also described his works as "...a gathering of grotesqueries and absurdities that almost defy imagination."

The Viz release of the manga was nominated for the 2009 Eisner Award in the category "Best U.S. Edition of International Material—Japan". In a 2008 reader poll of seinen manga by About.com, Cat Eyed Boy won 8th place.
