= Maid-Droid =

- Poster for Maid-Droid (2009) in its theatrical release as The Old Man and the Love Doll: The Time of My First Period
- Directed by: Naoyuki Tomomatsu
- Written by: Chisato Ōgawara
- Produced by: Masaru Ikeda
- Starring: Akiho Yoshizawa; Anri Suzuki; Mari Yamaguchi; Yōko Satomi
- Cinematography: Kenji Oyamada
- Edited by: Sakai Editing
- Production company: Gensō Haikyūsha (幻想配給社)
- Distributed by: Xces
- Release date: January 30, 2009 (Japan)
- Running time: 80 minutes
- Country: Japan
- Language: Japanese

Maid-Droid (Japanese: メイドロイド), also known as Rōjin to Rabudōru: Watashi ga Shochō ni Natta Toki (Japanese: 老人とラブドール 私が初潮になった時; lit. The Old Man and the Love Doll: The Time of My First Period) and AI Kōkando Sensaa Tōsai: Maid-Droid (Japanese: AI（アイ）高感度センサー搭載 メイドロイド), is a 2009 Japanese science-fiction fantasy pink film directed by Naoyuki Tomomatsu. Among the awards it won at the Pink Grand Prix ceremony was the Silver Prize for Best Film.

== Synopsis ==
In the near future, Ueno is a man who has been raised with his parents' cyborg maid Maria. His parents pass away while he is a teenager, leaving Maria to care for Ueno. As an adult, Ueno's attachment to Maria leads him to attempt to program her for sex. This attempted consummation of their relationship fails, and when Ueno is an old man, Maria's power supply comes to an end, leaving Ueno alone. Meanwhile, a series of rapes occur in the city and Detective Yuri Akagi suspects a droid is responsible.

== Cast ==
- Akiho Yoshizawa as Maria
- Anri Suzuki (鈴木杏里) as Yuri
- Yōko Satomi as Woman A
- Mari Yamaguchi (山口真里) as Fiancee
- Masayoshi Nogami (野上正義) as Old Man
- Hiroyuki Kaneko (金子弘幸) as Rape Machine
- 如春 as Ueno
- Hiroshi Fujita (藤田浩) as Otaku critic
- Abō (亜坊) as Detective
- Kōji Senō (妹尾公資) as Detective

== Critical appraisal ==
Maid-Droid won several honors at the annual Pink Grand Prix. Besides winning the second place in the Best Film category, Naoyuki Tomomatsu was awarded Best Director for his work on this film. Prizes for Best Actor (Masayoshi Nogami) and Best Screenplay (Chisato Ōgawara) were also given for Maid-Droid.

The German-language site molodezhnaja, however, gives Maid-Droid a less-than-positive review, awarding it two out of five stars. While admitting that it can be enjoyed for its trashiness, and some good sex scenes, the review complains about the perceived misogynistic message behind the film. A scene in which young robots are praised while women over 30 are labeled "ugly" and physically abused for this reason is singled out as a particularly offensive jab at feminism. The review concludes that despite a few interesting ideas, the film as a whole is a clumsy misfire on the part of director Tomomatsu.

== Availability ==
Maid-Droid was released under the title Maid-Droid (メイドロイド) as an original video in Japan in 2008. The pink film studio, Xces gave the film a theatrical release in Japan on January 30, 2009 under the title Rōjin to Rabudōru: Watashi ga Shochō ni Natta Toki (老人とラブドール 私が初潮になった時; lit. The Old Man and the Love Doll: The Time of My First Period). It was released on DVD in Japan on March 6, 2009 under the title AI Kōkando Sensaa Tōsai: Maid-Droid (AI（アイ）高感度センサー搭載 メイドロイド). Cinema Epoch released Maid-Droid on DVD in the US through its Tokyo Erotique series on December 22, 2009.

Preceded by Nakagawa Jun Kyōju no Inbina Hibi	Pink Grand Prix Silver Prize; 2009	Succeeded by To be announced
