= A Larva to Love =

- DVD cover
- Directed by: Noboru Iguchi
- Written by: Noboru Iguchi
- Produced by: Yukiyasu Shimada
- Starring: Aki Arai; Yoshiyoshi Arakawa; Kimiko Inui; Akira Takatsuki
- Cinematography: Noboru Iguchi; Hiroshi Nishikawa; Jo Ōta; Demo Tanaka
- Music by: Yuuji Kitano
- Production companies: Image Rings; Noboru Puro
- Release date: 2003 (Japan)
- Running time: 110 minutes
- Country: Japan
- Language: Japanese

A Larva to Love (Japanese: 恋する幼虫, Hepburn: Koi-suru Yōchū) is a 2003 Japanese film directed by Noboru Iguchi.

== Cast ==
- Aki Arai as Yuki
- Yoshiyoshi Arakawa as Fumio
- Kimiko Inui as Yoshie
- Akira Takatsuki
