= Asami Sugiura =

Japanese pornographic actress (born 1985)

- 杉浦 亜紗美
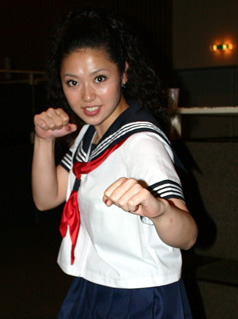
- Asami at Weekend of Horrors, in Germany, 2011
- Born: 19 August 1985 (age 41); Tokyo, Japan
- Other names: Asami Miyajima; Asami
- Years active: 2005–present
- Height: 1.60 m (5 ft 3 in)

Asami Sugiura (杉浦 亜紗美) performed under the name Asami (亜紗美), is a Japanese actress, model, and pornographic actress.

== Life and career ==
Asami was born in Tokyo, Japan on September 19, 1985. At age 19, she appeared in the theatrical film Kiss Me or Kill Me (届かなくても愛してる, Kiss me or kill me: Todokanakutemo aishiteru), directed by Naoyuki Tomomatsu and released March 12, 2005 by TMC. She also made a gravure (non-sex) video in March 2005 titled Wash Me! and she made her debut as an adult video (AV) actress in the April 2005 Kuki Tank release In Love. She continued working for Kuki through 2005, most often with director Harry Sugino, before moving on to other studios.

Outside the adult video field, Asami appeared in several V-Cinema releases and theatrical films including starring in the February 2006 film Sukeban Boy or Oira Sukeban (おいら女蛮 スケバン, Oira sukeban), directed by Noboru Iguchi, where she played a boy with a girl's face who decides to join a girls' school. One reviewer commented that she is "a woman playing a boy playing a girl. Which isn't easy to pull off. However, she actually does a thoroughly decent job of it."

In 2008, she also had a lead role playing the title heroine's sidekick Miki in Noboru Iguchi's gore-fest The Machine Girl which premiered at the Yubari International Fantastic Film Festival in March 2008. She reprised her role (billed as Asami Sugiura) in the January 2009 V-Cinema sequel Shyness Machine Girl, although no new footage of her was shot for the short. In between, she also had a part in Yūdai Yamaguchi's horror film Tamami: The Baby's Curse released in August 2008.

For her performances in such pink films as Female Prisoner Ayaka: Tormenting and Breaking in a Bitch, Asami won third place in the "Best New Actress" category at the Pink Grand Prix for the year 2008. Her performance in director Tsukasa Satō's Three Slaves (三匹の奴隷, Sanbiki no Dorei) won Asami the Best Actress award at the ceremony for 2009.

Asami's November 2008 adult video with three other actresses, Three Sisters Ninja Sex, a period costume female ninja (kunoichi) piece, was the Kasakura entry for the 2009 AV Grand Prix contest. At the end of 2008 and the beginning of 2009, Media Station's Bazooka label released three elaborate historical cosplay AVs starring Asami. Asami announced her retirement from the AV industry November 8, 2008 to devote herself to mainstream acting as Asami Sugiura.

Sugiura continued her association with director Noboru Iguchi, whom she credits with giving her the chance to do mainstream film work, with a role in his 2009 film RoboGeisha. In 2010, she starred in the action films Yakuza-Busting Girls: Duel in Hell (逆襲！スケ番☆ハンターズ ～地獄の決闘～, Gyakushū! Sukeban hantāzu: Jigoku no kettō) directed by Shin'ichi Okuda, and its sequel Yakuza-Busting Girls: Final Death Ride Battle (爆発！スケ番☆ハンターズ ～総括殴り込み作戦～, Bakuhatsu! Sukeban hantāzu: Sōkatsu nagurikomi sakusen) with the blood and gore effects for both films provided by Yoshihiro Nishimura. Both films made their world premier at the 2010 Yubari International Fantastic Film Festival and were released theatrically a week apart in May 2010.

Other features include co-starring with AV Idol Saori Hara in the 2010 gory sex comedy Horny House of Horror and a small role in Mutant Girls Squad (directed by Iguchi, Yoshihiro Nishimura, and Tak Sakaguchi). She appears in the original version of Nishimura's 2010 film Helldriver, but her scenes were removed from the international cut of the film.

In 2011, she co-starred with Maria Ozawa in Naoyuki Tomomatsu's science fiction V-Cinema release Karei naru erogami-ke no ichizoku: Shinsō reijō wa denki shitsuji no yume o miru ka which was also released with English subtitles as Erotibot. Sugiura also appeared in two more comic horror films for Noboru Iguchi, the September 2011 Zombie Ass and the July 2012 Dead Sushi. Sugiura traveled to Dallas, Texas in May 2014 to make her first North American convention appearance to promote her 2014 action film Gun Woman by director Kurando Mitsutake. The film had won the Special Jury Prize in its debut at the 2014 Yubari International Fantastic Film Festival and Sugiura was given a special mention at the festival for her performance as the heroine.

== Partial filmography ==
- Oira Sukeban or Sukeban Boy (おいら女蛮 スケバン, Oira sukeban) (February 2006)
- The Machine Girl (片腕マシンガール, Kataude mashin gâru) (March 2008)
- Female Prisoner Ayaka: Tormenting and Breaking in a Bitch (女囚アヤカ いたぶり牝調教, Joshū Ayaka: itaburi mesu chōkyō) (September 2008) (pink film)
- RoboGeisha (ロボゲイシャ, Robogeisha) (October 2009)
- Mutant Girls Squad (戦闘少女 血の鉄仮面伝説, Sentō Shōjo: Chi no Tekkamen Densetsu) (May 2010)
- Gothic & Lolita Psycho (ゴスロリ処刑人, Gosu Rori shokeinin) (September 2010)
- Helldriver (ヘルドライバー, Heru Doraibā) (September 2010)
- Karate-Robo Zaborgar AKA Denjin Zaborger (電人ザボーガー, Denjin Zabōgā) (January 2011)
- Zombie Ass (ゾンビアス) (September 2011)
- Dead Sushi (デッド寿司) (July 2012)
- Gun Woman (女体銃 ガン・ウーマン) (July 2014)
- Live (ライヴ) (May 2014)
- Antiporno (アンチポルノ) (September 7, 2016)

Awards and achievements
Pink Grand Prix
Preceded by Riri Kōda for Chō inran: yareba yaruhodo iikimochi	Pink Grand Prix for Best Actress; Asami; 2009 for Three Slaves	Succeeded by To be announced
