= Horny House of Horror =

- Film poster
- Directed by: Jun Tsugita
- Written by: Jun Tsugita
- Produced by: Hideomi Nagahama; Shin Hayasaka
- Starring: Saori Hara; Asami; Mint Suzuki; Yuya Ishikawa; Toushi Yanagi; Wani Kansai; Akira Murota; Demo Tanaka; Takashi Nishina
- Cinematography: Shin Hayasaka
- Edited by: Kazutoshi Usa; Jun Tsugita
- Music by: Piranha Orchestra
- Release date: 2010
- Running time: 75 minutes
- Country: Japan
- Language: Japanese

Horny House of Horror (ファッション·ヘル（ス）, Fasshon heru(su)) is a 2010 Japanese horror parody film directed and written by Jun Tsugita. The film is about three men, Nakazu (Yuya Ishikawa), Toshida (Wani Kansai) and Uno (Toushi Yanagi) who enter a brothel in Japan to allow Nakazu to have the experience paying for sex before his upcoming marriage. What the three men do not know is that the prostitutes plan to sexually torture the three men instead.

Tsugita created the film being a fan of western exploitation films and had a desire to make a parody of the film Motel Hell. In 2011, the film was shown at various film festivals around the world including the Brussels International Fantastic Film Festival and the New York Asian Film Festival.

== Plot ==
In Japan, Nakazu (Yuya Ishikawa) is about to marry a woman who insists on keeping up with his daily events through a cellphone. His baseball fan friends Toshida (Wani Kansai) and Uno (Toushi Yanagi) feel that Nakazu needs one last thrill before tying the knot as they stumble upon a brothel called the Shogun Massage Parlor after a night of playing baseball. Toshida and Uno insist on entering into the brothel with Nakazu who has never paid for sex before. The three are presented before female buttocks that are displayed through holes in a wall to give them a taste of what the brothel has to offer. Each of the three men separate into rooms with their selected ladies of the night, Nagisa (Saori Hara), Nonoko (Asami) and Kaori (Mint Suzuki). The trio of men are unaware of the brothel's mission to sexually torture customers.

== Production ==
Director and writer Jun Tsugita was a writer on Mutant Girls Squad with director and friend Noboru Iguchi. Tsugita was a fan of western exploitation films, and desired to make a film in that style. He felt that there wasn't this style of film in Japan and he specifically desired to make a parody of the film Motel Hell. In Japan, the film is called Fashion Hell with an extra letter S. By adding the extra H the title becomes "Fashion health" which is a Japanese name for a kind of whorehouse.

Tsugita cast pornographic actress Saori Hara who was known for her hardcore pornography films in Japan. Hara had begun appearing in more mainstream films in Japan and was cast by Tsugita because of her "sexy mood" which he felt was "perfect for this movie". While filming Horny House of Horror, Tsugita specifically kept in mind the foreign market outside Japan, later tracking the film's reception by reading internet discussions.

== Release ==
The North American premiere was at the New York Asian Film Festival on July 1, 2011, where it was shown with the short film Dark on Dark. The film premiered in Canada at the Fantasia Festival on July 29, 2011.

== Reception ==
Variety gave the film a mixed review, stating that Tsugita's film direction "feels rushed" and that the "production values are cheap" while saying that "Schlock-crazed fanboys everywhere will be engorged with excitement for the pic's ancillary release." Fangoria gave the film a rating of two and a half out of four, opining that the film "doesn't really break any new ground in the exploitation field".
