= Gun Woman =

- Film poster
- 女体銃 ガン・ウーマン
- Directed by: Kurando Mitsutake
- Starring: Asami Sugiura
- Release date: July 19, 2014
- Running time: 86 minutes
- Country: Japan
- Languages: English, Japanese

Gun Woman (女体銃 ガン・ウーマン, Nyotaiju Gan Ūman) is a 2014 Japanese erotic action film directed by Kurando Mitsutake and starring Asami Sugiura. It was released in Japan on July 19, 2014. The majority of the film was filmed in English, with some scenes in Japanese.

== Plot ==
Two assassins cross the desert to reach their evacuation point. During their journey, one recounts the tale of a man known as Mastermind. The man turned a junkie prostitute into a lethal killing machine.

== Cast ==
- Asami Sugiura as Mayumi - Gun Woman
- Kairi Narita as Mastermind
- Matthew Floyd Miller as Assassin (as Matthew Miller)
- Dean Simone as Driver
- Noriaki Kamata as Hamazaki's Son (as Noriaki R. Kamata)
- Tatsuya Nakadai as Mr. Hamazaki
- Midori M. Okada as Keiko

== Reception ==
Tom Mes of Midnight Eye included the film among the best Japanese films of the year and said it "offers thrills aplenty and features an absolutely electrifying physical performance from cult actress Asami."

At the 2014 Yubari International Fantastic Film Festival, the film won the Special Jury Prize.
