= Odessa Entertainment =

Japanese film distributor

- Odessa Entertainment logo.
- Company type: Kabushiki-gaisha
- Industry: Film, Anime
- Headquarters: Tokyo, Japan
- Products: Films, Anime
- Website: odessa-e.co.jp/

Cherry Lips logo.

Odessa Entertainment Co., Ltd. (株式会社オデッサ・エンタテインメント, Kabushiki-gaisha Odessa Entateinmento) is a Japanese film distributor. It was founded as Taki Corporation Inc. (株式会社タキ・コーポレーション, Kabushiki-gaisha Taki Kōporēshon). Some of their adult anime productions were released under their Cherry Lips (チェリーリップス, Cherī Rippusu) label.

== Films and anime produced and distributed ==
Films

- Chaos: Distribution
- Nagai Go no Horror Gekijo: Mannequin: Distribution
- Nagai Go no Horror Gekijo: Kirikagami: Distribution
- Oira Sukeban: Kessen! Pansutō: Distribution

Anime

- Black Jack: Distribution
- Chō Kuse ni Narisō: Distribution
- Dragon Knight Gaiden: Production
- Hi-sCoool! SeHa Girls: Distribution
- Seikon no Qwaser: Production
- Sonic the Hedgehog: Distribution
- Panzer Dragoon (OVA): Distribution
- Tama & Friends: Distribution
- Voltage Fighter Gowcaizer: Distribution

Anime (as Cherry Lips)

- Legend of the Wolf Woman: Production
- One: True Stories: Production
- Slave Nurses: Production
