= Stacy: Attack of the Schoolgirl Zombies =

2001 film by Naoyuki Tomomatsu

Stacy
- Film poster
- Directed by: Naoyuki Tomomatsu
- Screenplay by: Chisato Ōgawara
- Based on: Stacy by Kenji Ohtsuki
- Produced by: Naokatsu Ito
- Starring: Tomoka Hayashi; Yukijiro Hotaru; Natsuki Katō; Shirô Misawa; Masayoshi Nogami
- Cinematography: Masahide Iioka
- Music by: Tokusatsu
- Production companies: GAGA Corporation; Gensou Haikyuu-sha Ltd.
- Release date: August 18, 2001 (Japan)
- Running time: 80 minutes
- Country: Japan
- Language: Japanese

Stacy (Japanese: ステーシー, Hepburn: Suteishi), also known as Stacy: Attack of the Schoolgirl Zombies, is a Japanese horror comedy film directed by Naoyuki Tomomatsu and released in 2001. It is based on a novel of the same name by Kenji Ohtsuki, in which teenage girls aged 14-16 turn into zombies.

== Plot ==
In the near future, the entire world is struck with a bizarre malady which affects every girl between the ages of 14 and 16 years old.

Victims first experience a period of giddiness called "Near Death Happiness" ("NDH" or 臨死遊戯状態) before expiring. Within minutes of death the victim rises again as a flesh-eating zombie—a "Stacy". These Stacies run amok until they are cut into pieces in an act called a "Repeat-Kill" (再殺).

The government has organized the poorly trained "Romero Repeat-Kill Troops," who ride around on garbage trucks, ordered to act out the disposal of the Stacies. By law, a Stacy may only be Repeat-Killed by her loved ones or the Romero Repeat Kill Troops.

Through research, it is discovered that a key to the Stacy phenomenon is the "Butterfly Twinkle Powder" (BTP or 蝶羽状輝徽粉) that accumulates on the Stacies' skin.

== Cast ==
(in alphabetical order)

- Norman England - Jeff
- Tomoka Hayashi - Nozomi
- Yukijiro Hotaru
- Natsuki Katō - Eiko
- Shirô Misawa
- Masayoshi Nogami - Father
- Toshinori Omi - Shibukawa
- Kenji Otsuki
- Hinako Saeki
- Youji Tanaka - Rokuyama
- Donbei Tsuchihira
- Yasutaka Tsutsui - Dr. Inugami Sukekiyo
- Shungicu Uchida

== Soundtrack ==
The music featured in the movie is by Tokusatsu, of which Kenji Otsuki is a member.
