= The iDol (2006 film) =

- Directed by: Norman England
- Written by: Norman England
- Screenplay by: Takashi Yamazaki; Jiro Kaneko
- Story by: Norman England
- Produced by: Shinako Sudo; Norman England
- Starring: Jin Sasaki; Erina Hayase; Mitsu Katahira; Masayasu Nakanishi; Takako Fuji; Hirotaka Miyama; Shio Chino; Tomoo Haraguchi; Toshiyuki Watarai; Takashi Yamazaki; Yukijiro Hotaru
- Cinematography: Hiroo Takaoka
- Edited by: Rob Moreno; Yasu Inoue
- Music by: Kow Otani
- Production company: iMages from the iD
- Release date: 2006
- Running time: 52 minutes
- Country: Japan
- Language: Japanese
- Budget: US$10,000

The iDol is a 2006 film written, directed, and produced by independent filmmaker Norman England. A science fiction satire, filmed entirely in Japan, The iDol tells the story of a Japanese collector who comes into possession of a figure with origins not of this world. It is a satirical look at the world of otaku and the mass marketing of media culture, so prevalent in Japan, that creates these legion of obsessed fans. The iDol was a small production which did not receive worldwide attention due to its limited budget of $25,000.

The iDol premiered at the Fantasia Festival in Montreal, Quebec, Canada on July 16, 2006 and has subsequently played at various festivals around the world. It was shown on television for the first time on Japan's SKY Perfect satellite channel on March 3, 2008.

== Plot ==
Ken is a mild-mannered man in his mid-twenties who, like many men his age, has interests that stopped developing during adolescence. On a visit to a local toy collectors' shop, he acquires a rare alien action figure. Unexpectedly, Ken's world is turned inside out as the somewhat silly looking toy alters his life by benevolently giving him everything he has ever dreamed of and then callously taking it all back.

Ken's immature desires and indecisive nature are pit against a collection of seemingly normal, yet equally misguided characters who are meant to illustrate how people are victims of a socially implanted drive for things not in their own best interests.

== Production ==
First time director, Norman England, felt the urge to direct his own film after a year spent as a reporter on the set of the 2001 movie Godzilla, Mothra and King Ghidorah: Giant Monsters All-Out Attack. His idea for The iDol came in early 2002 while travelling on the subway in Tokyo, where he sketched a drawing of the alien figure and wrote a short synopsis.

England wrote the first version of the script in English. The Japanese version, on which he worked closely with Japanese scriptwriter Jiro Kaneko, was initially written as a literal translation of the English, however, readers responded saying it "came across like subtitles". This version of the script was abandoned, and England and Kaneko rewrote it from a purely Japanese perspective. Takashi Yamazaki also rewrote the script while he was directing Always Sanchōme no Yūhi. England produced the final script combining elements from his and Kaneko's version and Yamazaki's.

Casting began in 2004. Lead actor Jin Sasaki was recommended by director Shusuke Kaneko, with whom he worked on the TV series Holy Land. Takako Fuji joined the production after director England saw her performance on the set of the 2004 movie The Grudge.

Shooting took place over 10 days in August 2005, filming around Shimokitazawa, Shibuya, Shiba Park, Tamagawa River and at the Tokyo Film Centre School of Arts.

== Distribution ==
The iDol first premiered at the Fantasia Festival in Montreal on July 16, 2006.

Other festival screenings have included The Festival of Fantastic Films (Manchester, England - Sep 2006), Lyon Asian Film Festival (Lyon, France - Sep 2006), Nipponbashi International Film Festival (Osaka, Japan - Nov 2006), Kansai International Film Festival (Osaka, Japan - Oct 2007), Club Bollywood (Osaka, Japan - Oct 2007), Vancouver Comicon (Vancouver, British Columbia, Canada - Oct 2007), Yubari International Fantastic Film Festival (Yubari, Japan - Mar 2008), Japanisches Filmfest Hamburg (Hamburg, Germany - May 2008), Lost Plus One (Tokyo, Japan - Apr 2009).

The iDol had its television premiere on March 22, 2008 on Japan's SKY Perfect satellite channel.

== Cast ==
- Jin Sasaki as Ken
- Erina Hayase as Mayuka
- Mitsu Katahira as Yamada
- Masayasu Nakanishi as Tanaka
- Takako Fuji as Rika
- Hirotaka Miyama as Taki
- Tomoo Haraguchi as Boss Goro
- Toshiyuki Watarai as Alien-Kun
- Takashi Yamazaki as Cameraman
- Yukijiro Hotaru as Homeless Man
