= Prison Girl =

- Theatrical poster
- Directed by: Naoyuki Tomomatsu
- Written by: Chisato Ogawara
- Starring: Asami Sugiura; Hiroshi Fujita; Yukiharu Inoue; Fumiaki Kato
- Cinematography: Katsuji Oyamada
- Edited by: Shoji Sakai
- Distributed by: OP Eiga
- Release date: September 19, 2008
- Running time: 61 minutes
- Country: Japan
- Language: Japanese

Prison Girl (女囚アヤカ いたぶり牝調教, Joshū Ayaka: Itaburi Mesu Chōkyō) also titled Female Prisoner Ayaka: Tormenting and Breaking in a Bitch (女囚アヤカ いたぶり牝調教, Joshū Ayaka: Itaburi Mesu Chōkyō) is a 2008 Japanese pink film directed by Naoyuki Tomomatsu. Tomomatsu shot the film for the Gensō Haikyū-sha production company, and it was released theatrically in Japan by OP Eiga on September 19, 2008. It was given an Honorable Mention for Best Film at the 2008 Pink Grand Prix ceremony, where lead actress Asami Sugiura was also given one of the Best New Actress Awards.

== Synopsis ==
Prison Girl follows Ayaka, a bored housewife, trapped in a loveless and pointless marriage. Her imagination, on the other hand, is vibrant. Ayaka has been experiencing the same dream since she was a teenager. The dream is of her in prison, repeatedly getting molested by the prison guards and warden. The line between fantasy and reality increasingly gets blurred, as Ayaka struggles to make sense of her vivid prison assaults and her deteriorating marriage.

== Cast ==
- Asami Sugiura: Ayaka Kaminuma
- Hiroshi Fujita: Jail guard 1 / Debt collector 1
- Yukiharu Inoue: Jail guard 2 / Debt collector 2
- Fumiaki Kato: Lawyer
- Yoko Satomi: Misa
- Mari Yamaguchi: Woman / Kyoko
- Hiroaki Yanagi: Kenji Kaminuma

== Availability ==
The film was released in theaters in Japan on September 19, 2008. In the fall 2014, the independent distributor Pink Eiga, Inc. released the film on DVD along with their other titles Milk the Maid and Educating Yuna.
