= Yūko Daike =

Japanese actress (born 1971)

- Born: 9 August 1971 (age 54); Kōchi, Japan
- Occupation: Actress
- Years active: 1996–present

Yūko Daike (大家由祐子, Daike Yūko; born 9 August 1971) is a Japanese actress. She appeared in more than thirty seven feature films and in numerous doramas since 1996. A regular collaborator of Takeshi Kitano, Daike is better known for her roles in Fireworks, The Blind Swordsman: Zatoichi and Ju-on: The Curse 2.

== Selected filmography ==
Film
Year	Title	Role	Notes
2018	The Master Samurai	Mutsu's mother	
2013	The Crone	Saki Uesaka	
2010	Yakuza Hunters: The Revenge Duel In Hell		
2009	Onsen Waka Okami no Satsujin Suiri 20		
2005	Rampo Noir	Kagami jigoku	
2005	All About My Dog		
2003	Kill Devil	Chigusa	
2003	The Suicide Manual 2: Intermediate Stage	Masae Isoyama	
2003	Zatōichi	O-kinu	
2003	Kaidan Shin Mimibukuro: Yūrei Mansion	Yoko	
2002	Dolls	Young Ryoko	
2000	Ju-On: The Curse 2	Kyoko Suzuki	
2000	Ju-On: The Curse	Kyoko Suzuki	
1999	Kikujiro	Satoko Sugiyama	
1998	Murder on D Street	Mayumi Hanazaki	
1997	Hana-Bi	Tanaka's widow	
1996	Kids Return	Sachiko	

TV
Year	Title	Role	Notes
2011	Kaseifu no Mita		
