= Saikin-rettō =

- Theatrical poster
- Directed by: Kenji Murakami
- Written by: Jun Tsugita; Shiro Tsukasaki (novel)
- Starring: Naoto Takenaka; Kentaro Sudo; Saori Hara; Panzetta Girolamo
- Release date: 4 April 2009
- Running time: 82 minutes
- Country: Japan
- Language: Japanese

Saikin-rettō (細菌列島, さいきんれっとう; lit. 'Bacteria Archipelago') is a 2009 Japanese comedy film. It stars comedian Naoto Takenaka as "the General", the dictator of a fictional Asian country, parodying North Korean leader Kim Jong-il. The film also satirizes the 2009 Japanese disaster film Pandemic (Japanese film).

== Plot ==
A mysterious virus with a 100% mortality rate begins to spread across Japan. Everyone infected dies screaming, followed by their heads exploding. After the explosion, their faces transform into a smiling expression that strongly resembles Kim Jong-il.
