= Lala Pipo =

Lala Pipo: A Lot of People
- Directed by: Masayuki Miyano
- Written by: Hideo Okuda (novel)
- Screenplay by: Tetsuya Nakashima
- Produced by: Yûji Ishida, Michiyo Satô
- Starring: Hiroki Narimiya; Saori Hara
- Music by: Yasushi Sasamoto
- Distributed by: Nikkatsu
- Release date: February 7, 2009
- Running time: 93 minutes
- Country: Japan
- Language: Japanese

Lala Pipo: A Lot of People (Japanese: ララピポ) is a 2005 Japanese novel by Hideo Okuda. It was made into a movie by the same name in 2009. Lala Pipo is the directorial debut of Masayuki Miyano. The screenplay was written by Tetsuya Nakashima, writer-director of Kamikaze Girls and Memories of Matsuko.

The novel and movie both chronicle the life of six people involved with the Japanese porn industry. The book is divided into 6 chapters, with each chapter telling the story of one character.

The book is distributed by Vertical, Inc., and the movie is distributed by Third Window Films in the UK.
