= Miku Ishida =

Japanese singer, actress and idol (born 1988)

- Born: June 15, 1988 (age 38)
- Other names: Singer, actress, gravure idol
- Years active: 1999-2008; 2009-present

Miku Ishida (石田未来, Ishida Miku; born June 15, 1988) is a Japanese female singer and used to be a gravure idol, actress and a teen idol, had belonged to the show-business production LesPros Entertainment from 1999 to 2008. She is from Komaki, Aichi, and graduated from Hinode High School in March 2007. Then, on 9 October 2008, she retired as an actress. On June 17, 2009, she returned to the entertainment industry through her musical activities.

== Filmography ==
=== Television ===
==== Variety shows ====
- THE! Sekai Gyoten News (ザ!世界仰天ニュース), Nippon Television 2006

==== Dramas ====
- Yan-papa (やんパパ), TBS 2002
- Anata no Tonari ni Dareka Iru (あなたの隣に誰かいる), Fuji Television 2003
- Kato-ke e Irasshai! –Nagoya Jo- (加藤家へいらっしゃい! ～名古屋嬢っ～), NBN 2004
- Kinpachi-sensei 7th series, TBS 2004-05
- Diamond no Koi (ダイヤモンドの恋), NHK 2005
- Oishi Propose (おいしいプロポーズ), TBS 2006-
- PS -Rashomon- (PS -羅生門-) as a guest cast in episode 5, TV Asahi 2006
- Hanbun no Tsuki ga Noboru Sora, TV Tokyo 2006-
- Mikkaokure no Happy New Year! (三日遅れのハッピーニューイヤー!), TBS 2007
- Keishicho Sousa-ikka Kyu-gakari (警視庁捜査一課9係), TV Asahi 2008
- Shichinin no Onna-bengoshi (7人の女弁護士), TV Asahi 2008
- Yottsu no Uso (四つの嘘), TV Asahi 2008

=== Web films ===
- Shorai no Wakiyaku (将来の脇役) as Mayumi Miyano, Tokyo DisneySea

=== Films ===
- Kamen Rider Blade Missing Ace, Toei 2004
- Mirrorman Reflex, VAP 2006
- Nekome Kozo (猫目小僧), Art Port 2006
- Kamen Rider The Next, Toei 2007

=== Video game ===
- Harry Potter and the Chamber of Secrets - Japanese-language version - Ginny Weasley

=== CM ===
- Minute Maid, Coca-Cola 1999–2000
- Filet-O-Fish at Half Price, McDonald's 2000
- Idemitsu Kosan, 2000
- Kuro-goma Pudding (黒ごまプリン), House Foods Corporation 2002
- Gyunyu ni Soudan da. (「牛乳に相談だ。」ラブレター編), Japan Dairy Council 2006-
