= Ju-On: The Curse 2 =

- Directed by: Takashi Shimizu
- Written by: Takashi Shimizu
- Produced by: Takashige Ichise; Kazuo Katô; Masaaki Takashima
- Starring: Taro Suwa; Denden; Yūko Daike; Makoto Ashikawa; Kahori Fujii; Takako Fuji; Ryōta Koyama; Takashi Matsuyama
- Cinematography: Nobuhito Kisuki
- Music by: Gary Ashiya
- Release date: 25 March 2000
- Running time: 76 minutes
- Country: Japan
- Language: Japanese
- Box office: $196,200 (Thailand)

Ju-on: The Curse 2 (呪怨2), also known as simply Ju-on 2, is a 2000 Japanese V-Cinema supernatural horror film and the second installment in the Ju-on series being a sequel to Ju-on: The Curse. The film was released in Japan on March 25, 2000, and was later released on video on April 14.

It was followed by Ju-On: The Grudge in 2002, the first theatrically released movie of the saga.

== Plot ==
Teacher Shunsuke Kobayashi visits the Saeki household but finds his student, the young Toshio Saeki, alone. He finds the corpse of Kayako Saeki hidden in the attic and receives a phone call from her husband Takeo Saeki who reveals he has killed Kobayashi's pregnant wife Manami and butchered her unborn child, believing Kayako was being unfaithful upon discovering she has an obsessive crush on Kobayashi. Kayako's body rises as an Onryō and kills Kobayashi, before tracking down and killing the rampaging Takeo.

Sometime later, a woman named Kyoko helps her brother Tatsuya, a real estate agent, to examine the Saeki house and put it on the market. They sell the house to Yoshimi and Hiroshi Kitada but Yoshimi is possessed by Kayako after receiving anonymous mail from her and Toshio. Kyoko sees a possessed Yoshimi staring at her one day, prompting her to leave and visit her nephew Nobuyuki, who lives in the apartment once owned by the Kobayashis. They witness a vision of Takeo murdering Manami and are affected by the Saeki curse. Tatsuya moves them to his parents' house in the countryside, where Kyoko is seemingly possessed and rocks back and forth with a baby whilst Nobuyuki has become mute. Convinced the Saeki house's curse is responsible, Tatsuya heads off to investigate. Meanwhile, Yoshimi murders her husband by bludgeoning him with a frying pan and kills Tatsuya when he visits. All of Tatsuya's relatives, except Nobuyuki, subsequently perish from the curse.

Around a month later, detectives Kamio and Iizuka observe Nobuyuki, who is still mute. Both visit police officer Yoshikawa, who has been driven insane by his investigation of the deaths surrounding the Saeki house. After the visiting detectives leave, Kayako appears in Yoshikawa's home and kills both him and his wife. At the police station, Kamio gets frightened when he sees Kayako, alerting Iizuka and another female officer who go to check his office. Kamio remains outside out of fear but Kayako reappears and kills him.

At school, Nobuyuki spots Kayako outside the window, who suddenly crawls through it. Nobuyuki tries to hide in a nearby science lab but is killed and turned into an onryō by two Kayakos. An army of Kayakos is also seen outside; some scratch the windows of the lab whilst others stand outside in the rain emitting the death rattle while rocking left and right in the school yard.

Meanwhile, three schoolgirls named "Saori", "Chiaki", and "Ayano" visit the now-abandoned Saeki house on a dare and drink from a bottle of sake lying around, finding that it tastes horrible. In the end, as they explore the second floor, they notice something bad has happened inside the attic.

== Cast ==
- Yūko Daike as Kyoko Suzuki (鈴木 響子, Suzuki Kyōko)
- Makoto Ashikawa as Tatsuya Suzuki (鈴木 達也, Suzuki Tatsuya)
- Kahori Fujii as Yoshimi Kitada (北田 良美, Kitada Yoshimi)
- Yūrei Yanagi as Shunsuke Kobayashi (小林 俊介, Kobayashi Shunsuke)
- Ryota Koyama as Toshio Saeki
- Takako Fuji as Kayako Saeki
- Takashi Matsuyama as Takeo Saeki
- Kaei Okina as Hiroshi Kitada (北田 洋, Kitada Hiroshi)
- Tomohiro Kaku as Nobuyuki Suzuki (鈴木 信之, Suzuki Nobuyuki)
- Taizo Mizumura as Taiji Suzuki (鈴木 泰二, Suzuki Taiji)
- Harumi Matsukaze as Fumi Suzuki (鈴木 ふみ, Suzuki Fumi)
- Yue as Manami Kobayashi (小林 真奈美, Kobayashi Manami)
- Denden as Yoshikawa (吉川)
- Taro Suwa as Kamio (神尾)

== Release ==
Ju-On 2: The Curse was released in Japan on home video on March 25, 2000. The film will be released in Japan in theaters in 4K resolution on August 8, 2025.

== Stage adaptation ==
A stage play adaptation of Ju-On was developed in 2023. It adapts the plots from this film and its prequel.

== Reception ==
The website Moira Reviews wrote that, although Ju-On: The Grudge was the high point of the film series, The Curse, although a B-budget film, did "produce a number of uncanny scares – the images of the mother’s croaking body crawling down the stairs; the eerie appearances of the little boy. Especially effective is the scene where a mother sees her bloodied daughter walking up the stairs and follows a trail of bloody footprints."

== Sources ==
- Choi, Jinhee; Wada-Marciano, Mitsuyo (2009). Horror to the Extreme: Changing Boundaries in Asian Cinema. Hong Kong University Press. ISBN 978-9622099739.
- Kalat, David (2007). J-Horror: The Definitive Guide to The Ring, The Grudge and Beyond. Vertical Inc. ISBN 978-1-932234-08-4.
