= Deep Sea Monster Reigo =

- Theatrical release poster
- Directed by: Shinpei Hayashiya
- Written by: Shinpei Hayashiya; Keita Toriumi
- Produced by: Shinpei Hayashiya
- Starring: Taiyo Sugiura; Mai Nanami; Yukijiro Hotaru; Susumu Kurobe; Yoji Tanaka; Yumika Hayashi; Mickey Curtis
- Cinematography: Masayuki Nakazawa
- Edited by: Yutaka Arai; Keiichirô Imamura
- Music by: Keiichirô Kitazono
- Distributed by: Intermedia
- Release date: 10 May 2008 (Japan)
- Running time: 81 min
- Country: Japan
- Language: Japanese

Deep Sea Monster Reigo (深海獣レイゴー, Shinkaijū Reigō) also known as Reigo: The Deep-Sea Monster vs. the Battleship Yamato is a 2008 independently-made Japanese tokusatsu kaiju film by Shinpei Hayashiya. Veteran artist Keita Amemiya designed the titular monster. The film's original working title was Reigo vs. Yamato (レイゴー対大和 - Reigô tai Yamatô).

The film, set in World War II, depicts the story of the real-life Japanese battleship, the Yamato, which is confronted in the Pacific Ocean by giant monsters, including the most fearsome of them all, Reigo.

The film was released on home video in the United States in 2019 under the title Reigo: King of the Sea Monsters.

== Plot ==
In September 1942, Captain Yamagami is ordered to rendezvous the Yamato with the Combined Fleet that is gathering at the Truk Islands (aka Chuuk Islands) in Micronesia, a key strategic point in the South Pacific. With clear blue skies above and surrounded by coral reefs below, the South Seas became a strong base for the Combined Fleet and the front lines of the naval war; a place where many battles were fought. Decades later, the sea bed surrounding the Truk Islands is still littered with the remains of more than 60 warships and airplanes.

Among Yamagami’s crew is the cantankerous Divisional Officer Noboru Osako and the young Ensign Takeshi Kaido. Unsure of what the future may bring, Kaido went off to war without declaring his intentions for his childhood sweetheart, Chie Kojima. He always carries her photo in his coat pocket, while Chie longs for his return to their seaside hometown.

When the Yamato arrives at Truk, the married Osako decides to ease his worries over leaving behind a pregnant wife by sneaking an island woman named Momoka aboard ship for some private recreation. But to Osako’s annoyance, Momoka brings along her elderly grandfather who insists on telling him a local tale about monsters that has been passed down for generations. The disbelieving naval officer is told that the surrounding waters are home to man-sized, carnivorous Bonefishes…and, as dangerous as the fish are, they are nothing more than an "opening act" for an even greater menace; the legendary Hell King of the Seas called Reigo.

The next night, a lookout spots a massive shape half-submerged in the distance. Believing it to be an enemy submarine, the Yamato fires on it and scores a direct hit. Osako is shocked when the object emits a strange cry as it sinks beneath the waves. He reports the incident and the story of Reigo to his commander and shipmates. Unbeknownst to the crew, they have killed the offspring of Reigo.

Not long after that first encounter, a school of luminous Bonefish launch themselves from the water like flying fish and attack a group of soldiers standing watch on the Yamato’s deck. Kaido hears their screams and rushes to the rescue, but finds the men already torn to pieces.

Just as Momoka's grandfather had predicted, the Bonefish heralded the arrival of Reigo, an 80 meters-long beast resembling a cross between Godzilla and a shark. Enraged by the murder of its cub, the monster attacks the Combined Fleet. The naval forces are caught off guard, and Reigo is able to destroy the escort ships and damage the Yamato before returning to the ocean depths.

The crew quickly regroups and plans a counterattack, but when Reigo returns it manages to stay one step ahead of the Japanese forces. Almost as if it is aware that the Yamato’s main guns are long range weapons which are ineffective up close, the monster attacks at close range or blasts the ships from underwater with blue bursts of electricity.

Thoughts of family and lovers back home… fear at being confronted by an unknown enemy… conflict and confrontation explode among the officers and crew over the best battle strategy to use against the threat of Reigo.

Over Osako’s loud objections, Kaido suggests a last-ditch plan of attack that will either stop Reigo or sink the Yamato. Now the stage is set for a final battle to unfold between the world’s largest battleship and the mysterious dragon-like monster that glides through the seas at will.

== Cast ==
- Taiyou Sugiura
- Susumu Kurobe
- Yukijirō Hotaru as Hajime Edo
- Miyu Oriyama as Matsuri Edo
- Mao Urata as Hibari Edo
- Isamu Ago
- Mickey Curtis
- Mai Nanami as Chie Kojima

== Sequel ==
In 2009, director Hayashiya made a follow-up entitled The Deep-Sea Monster Raiga (深海獣雷牙, Shinkai-jū raiba). The film features a more traditional Godzilla-like kaiju called Raiga. The creature rises from the sea to do battle with another of his kind.

The film was released in the United States under the title of Raiga: God Of The Monsters.
