= Yoshihiro Nishimura =

Japanese film director (1967–2026)

- 西村 喜廣
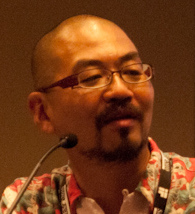
- Nishimura in 2010
- Born: 1 April 1967; Tokyo, Japan
- Died: 25 May 2026 (aged 59); Tokyo, Japan
- Occupations: Make-up artist, special effects, film director, screenwriter
- Years active: 1995–2026

Yoshihiro Nishimura (西村喜廣, Nishimura Yoshihiro) (1 April 1967 – 25 May 2026) was a Japanese film director, special effects and makeup effects artist, and screenwriter who worked predominantly in the horror genre. Nishimura has been described as "a legendary director and effects artist" and "the Tom Savini of Japan" with "talent to burn".

== Life and career ==
Nishimura, born on 1 April 1967, had been interested in film from childhood but a major influence on his career was a painting by Salvador Dalí with distorted human bodies that he saw when in elementary school. He majored in law in college. Nishimura said that he didn't watch much television or movies but read horror magazines and gained much of his inspiration from his dreams.

He started making films while in junior high school by teaching himself about filming, lighting, special effects, and modeling. In 1995 with a small crew he made the independently produced movie Anatomia Extinction (限界人口係数, Genkai jinkō keisū meaning boundary population coefficient). Nishimura wrote the screenplay, directed, and did the special effects. The film was shown at the Yubari International Fantastic Film Festival in February 1995 where it won a Special Jury Award. The film would later form the basis for Tokyo Gore Police.

For several years, Nishimura did special effects and special makeup effects for a number of movies including the controversial thriller from Sion Sono, Suicide Club, and Noboru Iguchi's 2003 comedy-romance-horror A Larva to Love (恋する幼虫, Koi-suru Yōchū). In 2005, he did the special effects for the science fiction horror film Meatball Machine (ミートボールマシン, Mîtobōru mashin) directed by Yūdai Yamaguchi and Jun'ichi Yamamoto. One review of the film says "the makeup and special effects that the film is sold on are solid. Produced on a very meager budget, the make-up appliances look great."

Nishimura worked with Noboru Iguchi again in 2008 when he was in charge of special effects and makeup effects for the low-budget action and gore film The Machine Girl. When he finished The Machine Girl, Media Blasters, the USA distributors of the DVD, asked if he wanted to do another movie. He decided to do a re-make of his earlier short film Anatomia Extinction from 1995 and created the science fiction horror movie Tokyo Gore Police. Nishimura co-wrote the screenplay, directed the movie, did the special make-up effects and modeling, and had a small cameo role. He said that one difference was that as director, he could no longer take naps during breaks as he could when he was only concerned with special effects. The film was screened at numerous film festivals worldwide, credited with influencing a new wave of Japanese ultra-violent horror and science-fiction cinema.

In 2009, he did the makeup effects on Samurai Princess (also called Samurai Princess: Devil Princess) for director Kengo Kaji and also on director Kōsuke Suzuki's Stop the Bitch Campaign. For the 2009 production of Vampire Girl vs. Frankenstein Girl (吸血少女対少女フランケン, Kyūketsu Shōjo tai Shōjo Furanken), Nishimura teamed with Naoyuki Tomomatsu as co-director and with fight choreographer Taku Sakaguchi who had previously worked with Nishimura on Tokyo Gore Police and Meatball Machine. The movie had its world premier at the New York Asian Film Festival on June 26 and opened in Japan August 15, 2009.

Nishimura started his own effects company based in Tokyo, Nishimura Eizo Co., Ltd. Partnering with visual effects company Studio Buckhorn and Studio HigeMigane in 2010, it became part of Pabaan: The Image Production Group.

In 2010, Nishimura co-directed Mutant Girls Squad with Noboru Iguchi and Tak Sakaguchi, as well as directing the action/horror film Helldriver, his first solo directing duty since "Tokyo Gore Police." The same year, he created the special effects for Horny House of Horror, starring AV starlets Asami, Mint Suzuki, and Saori Hara.

In 2011, Nishimura directed the "Killer" music video for Osaka rock band The 50 Kaitenz (ザ５０回転ズ, The 50 Kaitenz).

He directed the music video for Ena Fujita's June 2018 single "Ienai Koto wa Uta no Naka". It was released in two versions as the uncensored one was banned from TV due to its gore. Nishimura then expanded the music video into the October 2019 feature film Welcome to Japan: Hinomaru Lunch Box, which Fujita also stars in.

Nishimura died from cirrhosis of the liver on 25 May 2026, following a two-week hospital stay. He died at the age of 59.

== Credits ==
As director

- Welcome to Japan: Hinomaru Lunch Box (2019)
- Ienai Koto wa Uta no Naka (music video for Ena Fujita) (2018)
- Meatball Machine Kodoku (2017)
- The Ninja War of Torakage (2014)
- Zombie TV (2013)
- The Profane Exhibit (segment "The Hell Chef") (2013)
- The ABCs of Death (Segment "z is for Zetsumetsu") (2012)
- Gekijo-ban: Harapeko Yamagami-kun (2010)
- The Ancient Dogoo Girls (TV Series-1 Episode "Yokai: Sukinshippu) (2010)
- Helldriver (2010)
- Mutant Girls Squad (2010)
- Vampire Girl vs. Frankenstein Girl (2009)
- 63-fun-go (short) (2009)
- Tokyo Gore Police (2008)
- Meatball Machine: Reject of Death (Short) (2007)
- Speakerman: The Boo (2004)
- Anatomia Extinction (1995)
- Sham Nation (1987)
- Seija ga machi ni yatte kita (1986)
- The Face (short) (1985)
- Paradox (Short) (1984)

== Awards ==
Yubari International Fantastic Film Festival

- 1995 Special Jury Award Off Theatre Competition: Anatomia Extinction (Genkai jinkō keisū)

Fant-Asia Film Festival

- 2009 3rd Place Guru Prize For Most Energetic Film
- 2008 Best Asian Film: Tokyo Gore Police

Cyber Horror Awards

- 2008 Nominee for Best Film: Tokyo Gore Police
- 2008 Nominee for Tom Savini Award for Best Makeup: Yoshihiro Nishimura
