= Vampire Girl vs. Frankenstein Girl =

- Film poster
- Directed by: Yoshihiro Nishimura; Naoyuki Tomomatsu
- Screenplay by: Yoshihiro Nishimura
- Based on: Manga of the same name by Shungiku Uchida
- Produced by: Masatsugu Asahi
- Starring: Yukie Kawamura; Eri Otoguro; Takumi Saito
- Cinematography: Shu G. Momose
- Music by: Kou Nakagawa
- Distributed by: Excellent Film; Eleven Arts
- Release dates: 26 June 2009 (United States); 15 August 2009 (Japan)
- Running time: 85 minutes
- Country: Japan
- Language: Japanese

Vampire Girl vs. Frankenstein Girl (Japanese: 吸血少女対少女フランケン, Hepburn: Kyūketsu Shōjo tai Shōjo Furanken) is a 2009 Japanese gore film. It was directed by Yoshihiro Nishimura and Naoyuki Tomomatsu and premiered at the New York Asian Film Festival in June 2009. It is based on a manga of the same name by Shungiku Uchida.

== Plot ==
In a typical Tokyo high school, a perpetually teenage vampire named Monami falls for her male classmate, Mizushima; however, despite him reciprocating her feelings, the young man is already (reluctantly) dating a girl named Keiko, who is both the leader of a Sweet Lolita gang and the vice principal/science professor's daughter.

The ensuing love triangle soon leads Keiko to seek the assistance of her father who, unbeknownst to his daughter, moonlights as a Kabuki-clad mad scientist with the school nurse as his assistant. The pair experiment on students in the school basement, hoping to discover the secret of reanimating corpses in a matter akin to the work of the fictional mad scientist, Victor Frankenstein.

Their hopes are soon answered when they discover a solution of Monami's blood holds the properties to bring life to dead body parts and inanimate objects.

The story begins to unfold after Mizushima carelessly accepts a honmei choco spiked with Monami's blood, turning him into a half vampire. When Keiko discovers their secret, she attacks Monami but accidentally throws herself off the school roof in the process. Her premature death leads to her father using the blood solution to transform her into a vicious Frankenstein's monster determined to get revenge against Monami.

From then on, Monami and Keiko battle each other in the pursuit of winning Mizushima's heart, regardless of his feelings towards either of them. Monami ultimately kills her archrival by ripping the flesh off the latter's body using droplets of her own blood to form spikes and impaling her skeletal corpse on top of Tokyo Tower.

At the end, Keiko's father turns himself in a Franken Advanced Composite Life Form with use of Monami's blood, and it is revealed that Igor was turned into a vampire by Monami a hundred years ago, and that Mizushima is only one in a long succession of boyfriends.

== Cast ==
- Yukie Kawamura as Monami / Vampire Girl
  - Honoka Nagai as Young Monami
- Eri Otoguro as Keiko / Frankenstein Girl
- Takumi Saito as Jyugon Mizushima (as Takumi Saitô)
- Eihi Shiina as Monami's Mother
- Takashi Shimizu as Chinese Professor
- Jiji Bû as Igor
- Erina
- Sayaka Kametani as Nurse Midori
- Sayako Nakoshi
- Aya Nishisaki
- Sayo
- Kanji Tsuda as Kenji Furano
- Ewan Anning as Francis Xavier

== Subculture references ==
The film parodies subcultures prevalent in Japan, including ganguro and Lolita. Wrist cutting is a theme that returns from Nishimura's 2008 film, Tokyo Gore Police.

== Release ==
In the United States, the film was released on 26 June 2009 from American Film Market.
