= Saori Hara =

Japanese AV idol, model and actress

- 原 紗央莉
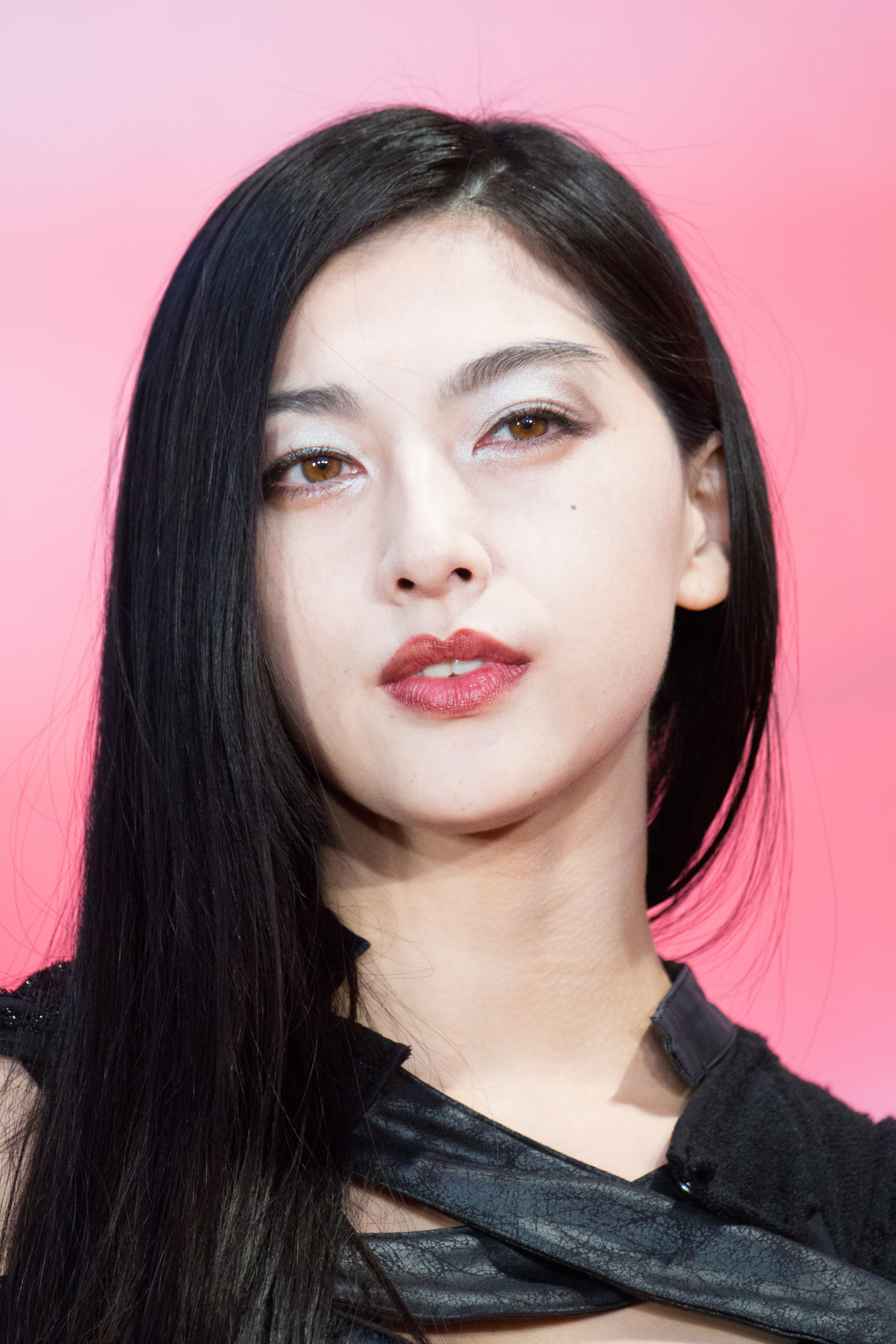
- Hara at the 2017 Tokyo International Film Festival
- Born: Mai Kato; January 1, 1988 (age 38); Hiroshima, Japan
- Years active: 2004–2011; 2014–present
- Height: 1.65 m (5 ft 5 in)
- Website: http://blog.livedoor.jp/harasaori/

Saori Hara (Japanese: 原 紗央莉, Hepburn: Hara Saori; born January 1, 1988) is a Japanese former pornographic actress, model and actress who has also used the name Mai Nanami (七海 まい, Nanami Mai) and most recently Miyabi Matsunoi or Miyavi Matsunoi (松野井 雅, Matsunoi Miyabi).

== Early life ==
Saori Hara was born in Hiroshima Prefecture to a Japanese mother and a father of mixed German-Japanese parentage.

== Mai Nanami ==
Hara started her career as a child performer under the name Mai Nanami. As a teenager, she sang the theme song Spicy Days (スパイシーデイズ, Supaishiideizu) for the animated TV show The Marshmallow Times on TV Osaka in 2004. She also had parts in two movies in 2005, the March TV drama The Dream of Delinquent Boys (不良少年の夢, Furyō Shōnen No Yume) for TBS, and the April theatrical release, horse-racing melodrama Haru Urara (Lovely Fields), which was later released as a DVD.

She had also made a bikini-model photobook, Mai Nanami First Photobook, in May 2005 and a non-nude (gravure) DVD titled Mai Nanami: Yamagishi Shin Digital Movie Museum which was released in August 2005. As Nanami, she also played the female lead in another mainstream movie that was due to be released in Japan in 2006 but had its debut at the American Film Market in Santa Monica, California in November 2005 as Deep Sea Monster Reigo. The film was eventually released in Japan as Reigo: The Deep Sea Monster vs the Battleship Yamato.

== AV career ==
After a long hiatus, she re-emerged as Saori Hara in August 2008 and appeared in a non-nude gravure video titled Clear Water. The next month, in September, she posed nude for the first time in the Japanese men's magazine Sabra, and it was announced that she was contracted to the Soft On Demand (SOD) adult video studio. She became the face of the SOD group in its anti-STD campaign in November 2008, a role formerly played by long-time SOD AV actress Nana Natsume. Hara's first adult video (AV) was released by SOD in January 2009 with the title Real Celebrity Saori Hara: Miraculous AV Debut and was reported to have sold 100,000 copies.

About the same time as her AV debut, Hara posed for a set of nude photos set in Tokyo public places by photographer Kishin Shinoyama which was published January 28, 2009, by Asahi Press as NO NUDE by KISHIN 1 20XX TOKYO. Shinoyama has said that he likes working with porn stars because they have no problems with nudity. However, both Shinoyama and Hara were charged by Tokyo authorities with public indecency.

Also in early 2009, Hara was in the TV Asahi movie Mission Section Chief Hitoshi Tadano: Season 4 Special, a tie-in to the fourth season of the manga-based TV show.

Her May 2009 hamedori adult video for SOD, Real Celebrity Saori Hara: Brown Eyes, directed by Company Matsuo, had the quarter-German Hara traveling to Germany for six days to explore her roots. The SOD studio celebrated the end of Hara's first year with the company with the four-hour cosplay video, Real Celebrity Saori Hara: 8 Changes and Sweet Sex, where she plays eight different characters.

Not long after her AV debut, Hara had a role in the Nikkatsu sex comedy about the porn industry, Lala Pipo, written by Tetsuya Nakashima, which reached theatres in February 2009. In April of that same year, Hara had a featured part in the disaster-parody comedy Saikin-rettō and also sang the theme song for the movie. July 2009 saw her play the protagonist in kunoichi sexploitation V-Cinema film Female Ninja Spy (隠密くノ一列伝~秘められた女忍び~) that was also released in an AV version.

Hara made a TV appearance with a major role in the late night 24-part manga-based J-dorama series Jōō Virgin, which was broadcast on TV Tokyo from October to December 2009. Also in the cast were fellow AV actresses Yuma Asami, Akiho Yoshizawa and Sora Aoi.

On December 11, 2009, Shueisha published Hara's autobiography titled My Real Name Is Mai Kato: Why I Became an AV Actress (本名、加藤まい 私がAV女優になった理由) (ISBN 4087805409). The 144 page book details Hara's upbringing and family life, her views on sex and her career as a teen idol and eventual AV idol. Her book is one of a number of autobiographical publications by actresses about the AV industry going back to Ai Iijima's million-selling Platonic Sex and including Mihiro's partially fictional May 2009 work nude and Honoka's tell-all Biography of Honoka: Mama, I Love You published in January 2010, which adult media reporter Rio Yasuda sees as marking a trend in which the AV industry is losing its stigma and being assimilated into Japanese popular culture.

Hara continued her AV career with SOD in 2010 including the January release Real Celebrity Saori Hara: 22 Years Old – Awakening Sexual Desire and the August SOD Star x SOD Cinderella – Mega Gangbang where the plot revolves around "veteran" SOD actresses being paired against newcomers. She was the winner of Adult Broadcasting Award for Best Actress in March 2010 for her 2009 appearances on adult channel Midnight Blue.

Hara's presence in mainstream films was maintained in 2010 with her role as an aromatherapy client in Yuriko's Aroma (ユリ子のアロマ, Yuriko no Aroma), which debuted at the Yubari International Fantastic Film Festival in February and was released theatrically in May. She also co-starred with Asami Sugiura and Mint Suzuki in the 2010 horror parody Horny House of Horror.

According to a 2010 article in Shukan Post, Hara and Maria Ozawa were the two most downloaded AV actresses in China and in August 2010, it was announced that Hara was cast with fellow SOD actress Yukiko Suo (周防ゆきこ, Suō Yukiko) for the US$3.2 million 3-D Hong Kong erotic film 3D Sex and Zen: Extreme Ecstasy produced by Stephen Shiu who was the executive producer of the Category III film Sex and Zen. The film opened in April 2011.

== Hiatus ==
Hara reportedly went through a nervous breakdown following the March 2011 Tōhoku earthquake and tsunami and decided to retire from show business, subsequently terminating her contract with SOD. As of April 2011, 3D Sex and Zen co-star Yukiko Suo said that she had not been able to contact Hara after the events. Her last original adult video, Real Celebrity Saori Hara vs. Amateur Men: Gonzo Initiation, was released on May 19, 2011. She announced her official retirement in August 2011 and a 5-disc compilation set marking her formal retirement that also featured some previously non-released scenes appeared on September 8, 2011.

Before her retirement Hara also appeared as the lead actress in the Japanese-directed British-produced art film, Venus In Eros which premiered at the Cannes Film Festival in May 2011 and was released as a feature film in Japan in October 2012.

In 2011, Complex magazine ranked her at #19 in their list of “The Top 50 Hottest Asian Porn Stars of All Time.”

== Career restart ==
After an absence of more than two years, in February 2014, Hara announced her return to the entertainment industry under the performing name Miyabi Matsunoi, given to her by actor Lily Franky (リリー・フランキー). She revealed that for a while after her retirement she had been working part-time in a Ginza bar and that after a short courtship, she had married a man 24 years her senior in October 2012. According to an article in Nikkan Sports her new start will not directly involve the AV industry, as she now wants to engage in entertainment activities that her mother would approve of. She also said she had been depressed and was drinking heavily before her retirement from adult videos.

Matsunoi appeared in the April 21, 2014, issue of Weekly Playboy in a nude photo spread under the headline "Rebirth."

In 2015, Matsunoi was cast along Masahiro Inoue in the television series Garo: Gold Storm Sho where she plays Amily who serves as a reoccurring antagonist in the Garo series.
