= The Machine Girl =

2008 Japanese action gore film

- Japanese theatrical release poster
- Directed by: Noboru Iguchi
- Written by: Noboru Iguchi
- Produced by: Yoshinori Chiba; Yōko Hayama; Satoshi Nakamura
- Starring: Minase Yashiro; Asami; Noriko Kijima; Honoka; Kentarō Shimazu; Ryōsuke Kawamura; Kentarō Kishi; Ryōji Okamoto; Tarō Suwa
- Cinematography: Yasutaka Nagano
- Edited by: Kenji Tanabe
- Music by: Takashi Nakagawa
- Production companies: Fever Dreams; Nikkatsu; Tokyo Shock
- Distributed by: Spotted Productions
- Release dates: May 23, 2008 (US); August 2, 2008 (Japan)
- Running time: 96 minutes
- Countries: Japan; United States
- Language: Japanese

The Machine Girl (Japanese: 片腕マシンガール, Hepburn: Kataude Mashin Gāru; lit. "One-Armed Machine Girl") is a 2008 Japanese-language horror action comedy film written and directed by Noboru Iguchi, and starring Minase Yashiro, Asami, Kentarō Shimazu and Honoka. An international co-production of Japan and the United States, the plot follows an orphaned Japanese schoolgirl whose life is destroyed when her brother is killed by a son of a Ninja-Yakuza clan. When her hand is cut off, she replaces it with a makeshift machine gun and seeks revenge.

Special effects were completed by Yoshihiro Nishimura, who went on to direct Tokyo Gore Police. It was initially released in the United States on May 23, 2008, before premiering in Japan on August 2, 2008.

== Plot ==
Ami Hyūga is an average high school girl whose world comes crashing down when her brother Yu and his friend Takeshi Sugihara are killed by bullies, led by Sho Kimura. As Ami tracks down Sho, she discovers that the bullies are associated with a ninja-yakuza family. She goes after the clan for revenge, but they brutally overpower her, cutting off her left arm. Ami escapes and seeks shelter with Takeshi's parents, Suguru and Miki Sugihara, two kindly mechanics who fit her with a multi-barrelled machine gun prosthetic. Ami and Miki (who uses a chainsaw) pursue the clan, massacring them one by one. Their victims' families, meanwhile, band together to get revenge.

Eventually, they reach the Yakuza's hiding place. As the fight continues, Miki loses her right foot and eventually dies. Ami loses her machine gun during her fight with Sho's father Ryūgi Kimura, but gets Miki's chainsaw. Finding Sho with hostages to keep Ami at bay, his mother Violet Kimura manages to disarm Ami while attempting to kill her with her drill bra. Noticing one of the hostages wet himself, Ami takes advantage and trips Violet onto the urine, electrocuting her. She then beheads Sho and Violet. Feeling she has nothing left to live for, she attempts to commit suicide. At that moment, Ami hears noise behind her and turns, sword at the ready.

== Cast ==
- Minase Yashiro – Ami Hyuga
- Asami Miyajima – Miki Sugihara
- Noriko Kijima – Yoshie
- Honoka – Sumire Kimura
- Yūya Ishikawa – Suguru Sugihara
- Kentarō Shimazu – Ryūji Kimura
- Ryosuke Kawamura – Yu Hyuga
- Nobuhiro Nishihara – Sho Kimura
- Taro Suwa – Kimura gang member

=== English dub Version ===
The English dubbed version was dubbed at NYAV Post in the United States and Philippines.

- Brina Palencia – Ami Hyuga
- Carrie Keranen – Miki Sugihara
- Kevin T. Collins – Suguru Sugihara
- Charles Bunting – Ryūji Kimura
- Stephanie Sheh – Yoshie
- Michael Sinterniklaas – Yu Hyuga
- Christopher Kromer – Sho Kimura
- Drew Aaron – Takeshi Sugihara, Teppei
- Wayne Grayson – Kitamura
- Dan Green – Yusume
- Jason Griffith – Ryota, various
- Erica Schroeder – Masako
- Mike Pollock – Sushi Chef
- Brandon Potter – Kaneko
- Dara Seitzman – Sumire
- Robby Sharpe – Hiroshi
- Christine Shipp – Yumiko, Old Lady
- Tom Wayland – Shinsuke
- David Wills – Suguano

== Production ==
According to writer and director Iguchi, the idea for The Machine Girl went back to a simple idea he had about a one-armed girl in a bikini looking for revenge. The idea for the machine gun arm came later.

== Release ==
The film premiered at the Yubari International Fantastic Film Festival in March 2008. It was released theatrically in the United States on May 23, 2008 and on DVD June 3, 2008, and in Japan on August 2, 2008. The Japanese DVD from Nikkatsu came out January 23, 2009 as a 2 disc set including the short Shyness Machine Girl (hajiraiマシンガール, Hajirai mashin gāru). Tokyo Shock, the Media Blaster label which released the original US DVD, announced that they were bringing out a two-disc special titled The Machine Girl Remix on August 4, 2009. The set includes the Shyness Machine Girl short, renamed Machine Girlite.

== Reception ==
The film's reception has been mixed to positive. It currently holds a 63% "fresh" rating on Rotten Tomatoes from eight reviews.

=== Rating ===
The film was rated 18 in countries such as Chile, Peru, and Spain because of nonstop gore, bloody action sequences and a rape scene with suggested necrophiliac overtones.

== Legacy ==
A direct-to-video sequel called Shyness Machine Girl (hajiraiマシンガール, Hajirai mashin gāru) was released on January 23, 2009 along with the Japanese DVD of The Machine Girl.

The American electronic music project Machine Girl was named after the film, as well as their song "Mg1" sampling several pieces of dialogue from the film.
