= Tokyo Gore Police =

2008 Japanese science fiction horror film

- Theatrical release poster
- Directed by: Yoshihiro Nishimura
- Written by: Kengo Kaji; Sayako Nakoshi; Yoshihiro Nishimura
- Produced by: Satoshi Nakamura; Yoko Hayama; Yoshinori Chiba; Tzadik Penimi
- Starring: Eihi Shiina; Itsuji Itao; Yukihide Benny; Jiji Bū; Ikuko Sawada; Shun Sugata
- Cinematography: Shu G. Momose
- Edited by: Yoshihiro Nishimura
- Music by: Kou Nakagawa
- Production company: Fever Dreams
- Distributed by: Nikkatsu (Japan); Media Blasters (US)
- Release date: 1 January 2008 (Japan)
- Running time: 110 minutes
- Country: Japan
- Language: Japanese

Tokyo Gore Police (Japanese: 東京残酷警察, Hepburn: Tōkyō Zankoku Keisatsu) is a 2008 Japanese science fiction horror film co-written, edited, and directed by Yoshihiro Nishimura and starring Eihi Shiina as Ruka, a vengeful police officer.

Tokyo Gore Police was released to several film festivals in North America. It received generally positive reviews, with some noting that it lives up to its title by being gory, perverse, and bizarre.

== Plot ==
In a dystopian Japan, a mad scientist known as the "Key Man" creates a virus that mutates humans into monstrous creatures called "Engineers" that sprout bizarre biomechanical weapons from injuries. To deal with Engineers, the Tokyo Police Force forms a special squad called "Engineer Hunters." The Hunters are a private quasi-military force that utilizes violence, sadism, and streetside executions to maintain law and order.

Among the Hunters is Ruka, a troubled loner skilled in dispatching Engineers. Besides helping the police, she is obsessed with finding the mysterious assassin who killed her father, an old-fashioned officer, in broad daylight. After killing a cannibalistic Engineer named Koji Tanaka, Ruka receives a new case that leads to the Key Man himself. He infects her by inserting a key-shaped tumor into her scar-riddled left forearm before disappearing. Meanwhile, while visiting a strip-club featuring several Engineers as dancers, the Police Chief becomes infected. He massacres the main precinct, causing the Tokyo Police Commissioner to order a city-wide crackdown on Engineers – indiscriminately executing anyone suspected of being one.

Continuing her investigation, Ruka learns that the Key Man was originally a scientist named Akino Miyama, and confronts him at his home. There she learns the truth about their past. Akino's father was a police sniper forced to resign after a failed operation resulted in him sustaining a severe leg injury. Desperate to keep his family out of poverty, he agrees to assassinate Ruka's father, who was leading a rally against the privatization of the police force. Shortly after gunning down Ruka's father, Akino's father was killed by the police commissioner – the real mastermind. Determined to avenge his father's death, Akino injected himself with the DNA of several infamous criminals, turning himself into the Key Man. Realizing they are seeking vengeance on the same man, Ruka slices Akino in half with her katana and heads back to the precinct.

On her way, she witnesses the police force brutalizing civilians accused of being Engineers. When her friend, a local bar owner, is drawn and quartered, Ruka's left arm mutates into an alien-like head with razor-sharp claws before she beheads the officers behind the execution. During her rampage, she is shot in the right eye by one of the officers, but her body quickly replaces it with a biomechanical one. Ruka confronts the police commissioner, who admits to her father's assassination, but explains that upon learning of the Key Man and the Engineers, he raised her to become the perfect Engineer Hunter as a form of atonement. Following a grueling sword fight, Ruka dismembers and eventually decapitates the commissioner – effectively ending his reign over the police force.

The post-credit scene reveals the Key Man is alive, having mended himself with the help of one of his test subjects.

== Cast ==
- Eihi Shiina as Ruka
- Itsuji Itao as Akino Miyama/The Key Man
- Yukihide Benny as Tokyo Police Chief Officer
- Jiji Bū as Barabara-Man
- Ikuko Sawada as bar independent owner
- Shun Sugata as Tokyo Police Commissioner General
- Tak Sakaguchi as Koji Tenaka
- Keisuke Horibe as Ruka's father
- Shōko Nakahara as prostitute club owner
- Cherry Kirishima
- Mame Yamada
- Marry Machida
- Maiko Asano
- Ayano Yamamoto
- Takashi Shimizu as Chinaman
- Tsugumi Nagasawa as Alligator Girl
- Cay Izumi as Dog Girl
- Sayako Nakoshi as Snail Girl
- Moko Kinoshita
- Norman England

== Production ==
While working on special effects for Noboru Iguchi's The Machine Girl, Yoshihiro Nishimura was asked by Media Blasters if he wanted to do another film. Nishimura decided to make Tokyo Gore Police, a remake of an independent film that he made many years before called Anatomia Extinction which received the Special Jury Award in the Off Theatre competition at the 1995 Yubari International Fantastic Film Festival. Shot and completed in just two weeks, Tokyo Gore Police would be Nishumura's first commercial film.

The fight choreographer for the film was Taku Sakaguchi who Nishimura has worked with previously on the film Meatball Machine. The comical yet satirical television commercial scenes in the film were filmed by Noboru Iguchi and Yūdai Yamaguchi. Yamaguchi suggested this to bring a different flavor to the film to balance out the rest of the film's more dark tone.

== Release ==
Tokyo Gore Police premiered in several film festivals before being released in Japan. The film had its North American premiere at the New York Asian Film Festival on June 21, 2008. The film premiered in Canada at the Fantasia Festival on July 12, 2008. The film has its Asian premiere at the Puchon International Fantastic Film Festival in July 2008.

A Region 1 DVD of the film was released on January 13, 2009 by Tokyo Shock A Region 2 DVD of the film was released on April 13, 2009 by 4Digital Media. A straight to video prequel has been announced for release in Japan.

== Critical reception ==
Tokyo Gore Police was received well by American critics on its original release. The film ranking website Rotten Tomatoes reported an 82% "Fresh" rating and an average rating of 6 out of 10, based upon a sample of eleven reviews. Brian Chen reviewed Police with a score of 3.5/5. He comments, "It's not a horrible film; it's not a great film; it's just everything it tries to be — perverse, grotesque, bizarre — and a little more." V.A. Musetto of the New York Post gave the film three stars out of four calling the film "bloody good". Michael Esposito of the Chicago Tribune gave the film three stars noting the film as "sick, twisted and gory, but surprisingly funny in an adolescent boy fantasy way — Beavis and Butt-head would love it."

Russel Edwards of Variety claimed, "Like Tokyo Shock's recent "Machine Girl," for which helmer provided gore effects, [the] pic[ture] will fleetingly exist in midnight sidebars at fests and much longer on fanboy ancillary." Edwards also said that Tokyo Gore Police had "occasionally witty moments, but the relentless catalog of mutilations lacks the emotional power of similar fare in pics by, say, fellow Japanese gorehound Shinya Tsukomoto [sic]."
