= Noboru Iguchi =

Japanese film director, screenwriter and actor (born 1969)

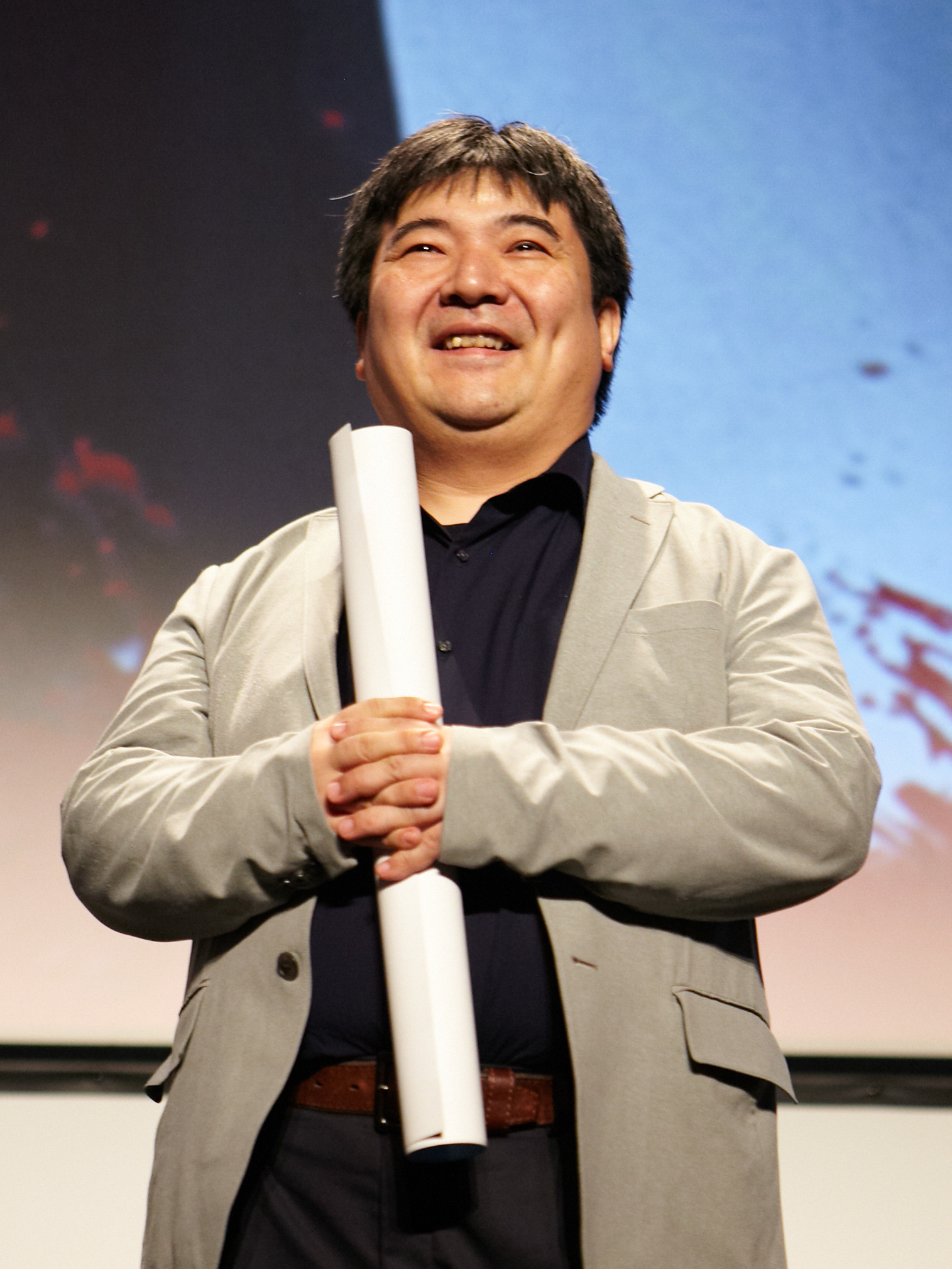
- Director Noboru Iguchi at the Horror and Fantasy Film Festival, Donostia-San Sebastián, 2016
- Born: June 28, 1969 (age 57); Tokyo Prefecture, Japan
- Occupations: Film director Screenwriter; Actor
- Years active: 1996 – present
- Height: 162 cm (5 ft 4 in)
- Website: http://blog.livedoor.jp/iguchinoboru/

Noboru Iguchi (井口昇, Iguchi Noboru) (born June 28, 1969) is a Japanese film director, screenwriter and actor. He has worked as a director in adult video (AV) as well as in the horror and gore genres.

== Life and career ==
Iguchi was born on June 28, 1969. In an interview he said he was influenced in his work by the ghost houses and freak shows he went to as a child in Japanese play lands, and that his aim in his films is to both entertain and surprise.

=== Adult videos ===
In his extensive career as an AV director, Iguchi has worked for a number of studios including CineMagic, Big Morkal, Try-Heart, h.m.p and Soft On Demand (SOD). Nana Natsume and Risa Coda have been among the AV Idols featured in his videos. His videos have explored several of the typical Japanese AV genres, from incest for SOD to "nakadashi", bondage, group sex and some enema fetish videos for CineMagic.

His video Final Pussy starring Nana Natsume won the Best Rental Video Award at the 2005 SOD Awards. In this January 2005 video, Natsume's character (as the result of a military experiment gone wrong) has guns burst from her breasts when sexually aroused. The special makeup effects were by Yoshihiro Nishimura.

=== Mainstream film ===
One of Iguchi's early movies was Kurushime-san (クルシメさん) which was first released in 1997. Iguchi was screenwriter, editor, cinematographer and director of the black comedy-horror film which won the Encouragement Prize at the 1998 Yubari International Fantastic Film Festival and starred Aki Arai, Miako Tadano and Tomoko Matsunashi.

In 2003, Iguchi wrote and directed the horror comedy A Larva to Love (恋する幼虫, Koi-suru Yōchū) (with effects by Yoshihiro Nishimura) about a strange relationship involving a boy, a girl, and a parasite. Iguchi also wrote and directed the February 2006 film Sukeban Boy or Oira Sukeban (おいら女蛮 スケバン, Oira sukeban) with AV star Asami. At an interview at the New York Asian Film Festival, Iguchi told of an incident where one of the actresses in the movie, completely unaware of her role, balked at doing action scenes totally naked. According to Iguchi "We had to calm her down, capture her, and convince her to do the job ... We made it so she could not leave the set ... [in] America we would have been sued."

Later in 2006, Iguchi directed Cat-Eyed Boy (猫目小僧, Nekome kozō) based on the manga by Kazuo Umezu. The movie, with gravure idol Miku Ishida, Asami Kumakiri, Hiromasa Taguchi, Naoto Takenaka and Kanji Tsuda, was released theatrically in Japan in June 2006, and on DVD in October of the same year.

Iguchi was also both the screenwriter and director for the 2008 action and gore cult film The Machine Girl (片腕マシンガール, Kataude mashin gāru) where he once again teamed up with Yoshihiro Nishimura who did the special effects and makeup effects. Iguchi said he wanted to make an action movie with a woman fighting and it started with just an idea of a girl losing her arm and going out for revenge and was originally called "One Armed Big Busty Girl" – the machine gun came later. Iguchi was a special guest at the 2009 and 2010 New York Asian Film Festival.

In 2010, Iguchi directed his largest-budgeted feature, the action film Karate-Robo Zaborgar, based on the popular 1970s television series Denjin Zaborger. He followed it with the scatological horror/comedy Zombie Ass in 2011.

In 2012 he directed the short film Fart for The ABC’s of Death.

== Theatrical releases ==
- A Larva to Love (恋する幼虫, Koi-suru Yōchū) (2003)
- Kazuo Umezu's Horror Theater: Snake Girl (2005)
- Manji (2006)
- Sukeban Boy (おいら女蛮（スケバン）, Oira sukeban) (2006)
- Cat-Eyed Boy (猫目小僧, Nekome kozō) (2006)
- The Machine Girl (片腕マシンガール, Kataude mashin gāru) (2008)
- Shyness Machine Girl (hajiraiマシンガール, Hajirai mashin gāru) (2009)
- RoboGeisha (ロボゲイシャ, Robogeisha) (2009)
- Mutant Girls Squad (戦闘少女 血の鉄仮面伝説, Sentō Shōjo: Chi no Tekkamen Densetsu) (2010)
- Karate-Robo Zaborgar AKA Denjin Zaborger (電人ザボーガー, Denjin Zabōgā) (2011)
- Tomie Unlimited (富江 アンリミテッド, Tomie anrimiteddo) (2011)
- Zombie Ass (ゾンビアス, Zonbiasu) (2011)
- Dead Sushi (デッド寿司, Deddo sushi) (2012)
- Nuigurumaa Z (ヌイグルマーZ) (2014)
- Live (ライヴ) (2014)
- Lock-On Love (覚悟はいいかそこの女子。, Kakugo wa Iika Soko no Joshi) (2018)
- Ghost Squad (ゴーストスクワッド) (2018)
- The Flowers of Evil (2019)
- IDOL NEVER DiES (アイドル・ネバー・ダイ) (2022)
- Tales of Bliss and Heresy (異端の純愛, Itan no junnai) (2023)

== Sources ==
- Noboru Iguchi at IMDb
- "Noboru Iguchi 井口昇". Urabon Navigator. Archived from the original on 2012-03-26.
- 井口昇 (in Japanese). Japanese Movie Database.
- 井口昇 いぐち・のぼる (in Japanese). AllCinema.
