= Rinako Hirasawa =

Japanese AV idol and pink film actress (born 1983)

- 平沢里菜子
- Born: May 18, 1983 (age 42); Miyagi Prefecture, Japan
- Height: 1.56 m (5 ft 1 1/2 in)
- Website: http://d.hatena.ne.jp/rinarinako/

Rinako Hirasawa (Japanese: 平沢里菜子, Hepburn: Hirasawa Rinako) is a Japanese AV idol and pink film actress. She has appeared in award-winning pink films, and was given a "Best Actress" award for her work in this genre in 2007.

== Life and career ==
Hirasawa had a part-time job at the video arcade in Tokyo's Ōkura Theater, a long-running venue for pink films, and became curious about the genre through the posters. She entered the entertainment field in 2003 through AVs where she specialized in the S&M genre while working for such major AV studios as Moodyz, Soft On Demand, CineMagic and Wanz Factory. After she had appeared in over 40 AVs, Hirasawa made her pink film debut in director Shinji Imaoka's Frog Song (2005). Hirasawa played the role of Kyōko, an aspiring comic book artist who works as a prostitute. The film was named the Best Film of the year, and Hirasawa was given the Best Actress award, second place, at the Pink Grand Prix. A few months later, in October 2005, she starred in the sex comedy The Strange Saga of Hiroshi the Freeloading Sex Machine, directed by Yūji Tajiri, which was shown at the 14th Raindance Film Festival in September 2006. Hirasawa had the role of the indulging love interest of the film's titular character.

After mid-2005, Hirasawa moved away from adult video work and more into mainstream and pink films, and V-Cinema. In her last entry on her AV blog in May 2006, she announced that she was leaving her agency "GOT" (ガットエージェンシー) and would be working freelance. Director Osamu Sato's 2007 film New Tokyo Decadence - The Slave was reportedly based on Hirasawa's own experiences. The film was named 9th best pink release of the year, and Hirasawa won the Best Actress award for her performance.

== Selected filmography ==
Video title	Release date	Studio	Director	Notes
=== Adult Videos (AV) ===
Anal Adultery 2 アナル姦通 第2章	2004-02-15	Moodyz Joker; MDJ-074	Katsuyuki Hasegawa	With Rin Nonomiya (AKA Mei Hasegawa) & Himika Aihara
Amateur Model Recruitment False Interview Trick 素人モデル面接ハメ撮り 偽りの募集と面接官の策略	2004-04-22	Red; D-075		With 3 other actresses
Eromesu 7 凌辱エロメス 7	2004-03-19	Wild Side / King of Realism; DWD-07	Kaoru Toyoda
THE HIP - Rinako Hirasawa; THE HIP 平沢里菜子	2004-03-27	Aurora Kokuryu; APKR-014	Kokuryu
LUSH Double Anal; LUSH ダブル アナル	2004-09-11	Aurora; DVKR-014		With Eri Ueno
Woman Who Wants to Be Beaten 打擲願望の女	2004-09-17	CineMagic; BA-068	Koisaburo Akai
Watashi O Idi Me Te Kudasai 私をイジめてください	2004-11-13	Hayabusa Agency; DVH-230		With Miku Sakashita & Yuria Hidaka
Remote Control Vibrator Club リモコンバイブ倶楽部がイク	2005-01-06	SOD; SDDM-553		With 5 other actresses
Immoral Anal Temptation 彼女の肛門 アナル小悪魔娘	2005-01-10	AVS; DAPS-20
Anal Orgasm アナルオーガズム	2005-04-01	Wanz Factory M-Mode; IO-102	Iceman Ochiai
White Shirt Fetish; Yシャツっ娘	2005-05-01	Wanz Factory e-kos CO-111		With 6 other actresses
Anal Temptation : Rinako Hirasawa	2005-06-25	Red Hot; RED-007		Uncensored
Slave Press No. 27 奴隷通信 No．27	2005-07-16	Art Video; 2335	夢流ZOU
Dera Beppin Rinako Hirasawa; Dera Beppin 平沢里菜子	2005-10-25	On Air Dekachin-Z; DRBP-01
Woman Who Wants to Be Beaten 打擲願望の女	2005-11-25	CineMagic Jyoh; DD-160	Koisaburo Akai	Compilation with Shiho Miyasaki
Exposure Rhapsody 4: Full View of Passersby, Car Sex Part 露出狂想曲 4 通行人から丸見え！カーセックス編	2005-12-01	Bakky; COZD-004
Paipan Jūkan 2 (Shaved Girl Beast Rape 2) パイパン獣姦 2	2006-01-13	Karma; KRFV-003		Bestiality
Beautiful Schoolgirl Rape Clinic 美人女子校生陵辱クリニック	2006-08-01	DreamVision21 con flower CFRJ-01
Maniac Love Text Lesson 5 マニアック・ラブ・テキスト 5 M女性の愛し方	2007-05-25	Sanwa Publishing; MCD-008		With Tsubaki Kanda

Movie title	Release date	Studio	Director	Notes
=== Theatrical films ===
Paid Companionship Story: Girls Who Want to Do It AKA Frog Song 援助交際物語 したがるオンナたち; Enjo-kōsai monogatari: shitagaru onna-tachi	2005-06-10	Kokuei; Shintōhō Eiga	Shinji Imaoka	65 Min. With Konatsu
The Strange Saga of Hiroshi the Freeloading Sex Machine; SEXマシン 卑猥な季節; Sex mashin: Hiwai na kisetsu	2005-10-07	Kokuei; Shintōhō Eiga	Yūji Tajiri	64 Min. With Mutsuo Yoshioka
Uncle's Paradise おじさん天国 (絶倫絶女); Ojisan tengoku aka Mighty Extreme Woman おじさん天国; Zetsurin Zetsujo	2006-05-12	Kokuei; Shintōhō Eiga	Shinji Imaoka	64 Min. With Shirō Shimomoto & Minami Aoyama
The Wife and the Secretary: Overflowing Love Juice 人妻とOL あふれる愛液; Hitozuma to OL: afureru ai-eki	2006-09-29	Shintōhō Eiga	Osamu Satō	With Erina Aoyama & Sakurako Kaoru
New Tokyo Decadence – The Slave 奴隷; Dorei	2007-03-09	Shintōhō Eiga	Osamu Satō	62 min.
Fushidara Bojō: Shirahada o Nameru Shita ふしだら慕情 白肌を舐める舌	2007-03-16	Tarō Productions; OP Eiga	Tarō Araki	60 min. With Yutaka Ikejima, and Lemon Hanazawa
Riyōten no nyōbō: yobai nema -->理容店の女房 夜這い寝間	2007-04-27	Sakae Planning; Xces	Sakae Nitta	60 min. With Kyōko Kazama
Yami o Kakenukero 闇を駆け抜けろ！	2007-06-09	Toka Jungle	Keita Tokaji	60 min. With Lemon Hanazawa & Akiho Yoshizawa
Waisetsu Oshō: Nyotai Hitsu Ijiri ワイセツ和尚 女体筆いじり	2007-06-09	Powerful; OP Eiga	Shigeo Moriyama (森山茂雄)	With Kazuhiro Sano
Nakagawa Jun Kyōju no Inbina Hibi 中川准教授の淫びな日々; Nakagawa Jun Kyōju no Inbina Hibi	2008-03-28	Matsuoka Productions; Xces	Kunihiko Matsuoka	With Minami Aoyama
Shaarii no Kōshoku Jinsei to Tenraku Jinsei シャーリーの転落人生	2009-04-11		Masanori Tominaga	With Kenzô Fukutsuya & Izumi Kasagi

== Bibliography ==
=== English ===
- Rinako Hirasawa at IMDb
- "Rinako Hirasawa". pinkeiga.com. Archived from the original on 2011-12-09.
- Sharp, Jasper (2008). Behind the Pink Curtain: The Complete History of Japanese Sex Cinema. Guildford: FAB Press. pp. 175, 326, 339, 345, etc. ISBN 978-1-903254-54-7.

=== Japanese ===
- 平沢里菜子 ひらさわ・りなこ (in Japanese). allcinema.net.
- 平沢里菜子（ひらさわりなこ） (in Japanese). www.dmm.co.jp.
- "女優・平沢里菜子インタビュー (Interview with Actress Rinako Hirasawa)" (in Japanese). www.walkerplus.com. 2006-12-06. Archived from the original on 2008-01-15.

Awards and achievements
Pink Grand Prix
Preceded by Minami Aoyama for Uncle's Paradise	Pink Grand Prix for Best Actress; Rinako Hirasawa; 2007 for New Tokyo Decadence – The Slave	Succeeded by Kiri Kōda for Chō inran: yareba yaruhodo iikimochi
Pinky Ribbon Awards
Preceded by New Award	Pinky Ribbon Award for Outstanding Performance by an Actress; Rinako Hirasawa; 2006; With: Erina Aoyama; Komari Awashima	Succeeded by Lemon Hanazawa; Kiri Kōda
Preceded by Akiho Yoshizawa	Pinky Ribbon Award for Best Actress; Rinako Hirasawa; 2007	Succeeded by Maki Tomoda
