= List of Japanese films of 2005 =

== Highest-grossing films ==
Rank	Title	Gross
1	Howl's Moving Castle	¥19.6 billion
2	Pokémon: Lucario and the Mystery of Mew	¥4.30 billion
3	Negotiator: Mashita Masayoshi	¥4.20 billion
4	Nana	¥4.03 billion
5	The Suspect: Muroi Shinji	¥3.83 billion

== List of films ==
A list of films released in Japan in 2005 (see 2005 in film).

Title	Director	Cast	Genre	Notes
All About My Dog		Yūki Amami, YosiYosi Arakawa	Drama	
Always Sanchōme no Yūhi	Takashi Yamazaki	Maki Horikita; Hidetaka Yoshioka		Japan Academy Prize for Best Film; Based on a manga
Azumi 2: Death or Love	Shusuke Kaneko	Aya Ueto, Yuma Ishigaki, Chiaki Kuriyama, Shun Oguri	Action, Samurai film	
Bashing	Masahiro Kobayashi		Based on actual events	Entered into the 2005 Cannes Film Festival
Blind Love	Daisuke Gotō	Konatsu, Yōta Kawase	Pink	Silver Prize, Pink Grand Prix
Crayon Shin-chan: Buri Buri 3 Minutes Charg			Anime	
CUSTOM MADE 10.30	Hajime Ishimine(ANIKI)	Kaela Kimura, Erika Saiemon, Tamio Okuda, Kenichi Matsuyama, Susumu Terajima, Ryō Kase, Mickey Curtis, Yoshiko Miyazaki	Comedy, Music	
Dekaranger vs. Abaranger			Action, Super Sentai	
Detective Conan: Strategy Above the Depths			Anime	
Fullmetal Alchemist the Movie: Conqueror of Shamballa			Anime	
For Every Fukui Revolution	Yoichiro Morikawa	Kanji Tsuda; Hiroshi Yamamoto		
Frog Song	Shinji Imaoka	Konatsu; Rinako Hirasawa	Pink	Best Film, Pink Grand Prix
Funky Forest	Katsuhito Ishii	Tadanobu Asano; Susumu Terajima	Comedy	
The Great Yokai War	Takashi Miike		Fantasy	
Itsuka dokusho suruhi	Akira Ogata	Yūko Tanaka, Ittoku Kishibe		
Kamataki	Claude Gagnon	Matthew Smiley, Tatsuya Fuji, Kazuko Yoshiyuki	Drama	Canada-Japan coproduction
Kamen Rider Hibiki & The Seven Senki			Action / Superhero	
Kamen Rider the First			Action / Superhero	Remake of the original Kamen Rider
Konjiki no Gash Bell!!: Attack of the Mechavulcan			Anime	
Linda Linda Linda	Nobuhiro Yamashita	Bae Doona, Aki Maeda, Yu Kashii, Shiori Sekine		
Lorelei: The Witch of the Pacific Ocean	Shinji Higuchi			
Magiranger vs. Dekaranger				
Memoirs of a Geisha	Rob Marshall	Zhang Ziyi; Ken Watanabe; Michelle Yeoh; Kōji Yakusho; Youki Kudoh; Kaori Momoi; Gong Li	Epic period drama	
Miss Peach: Peachy Sweetness Huge Breasts	Yumi Yoshiyuki	Yumika Hayashi; Sakurako Kaoru	Pink romantic comedy	Yumika Hayashi's last film
My God, My God, Why Hast Thou Forsaken Me?	Shinji Aoyama		Drama	Screened at the 2005 Cannes Film Festival
Nana	Kentarō Ōtani	Aoi Miyazaki; Mika Nakashima	Manga; Drama	
Naruto the Movie 2: Great Clash! The Illusionary Ruins at the Depths of the Earth			Anime	
Negadon: The Monster from Mars				
Noriko's Dinner Table				
One Piece the Movie: Baron Omatsuri and the Secret Island		Mayumi Tanaka, Kazuya Nakai, Akemi Okamura, Kappei Yamaguchi, Hiroaki Hirata, Ikue Ōtani, Yuriko Yamaguchi		
Otokotachi no Yamato			Historical; War	
Pacchigi!	Kazuyuki Izutsu	Erika Sawajiri, Shun Shioya		
Poketto Monsutā Adobansu Jenerēshon Myū and the Wave Guiding Hero Rukario			Anime	
The Princess in the Birdcage Kingdom	Itsuro Kawasaki	Miyu Irino, Yui Makino, Tetsu Inada, Daisuke Namikawa, Mika Kikuchi	Anime	Based on a manga
Princess Raccoon	Seijun Suzuki	Zhang Ziyi; Joe Odagiri	Musical fantasy	Screened at the 2005 Cannes Film Festival
Rinne	Takashi Shimizu	Yuka	Horror	
The Samurai I Loved	Mitsuo Kurotsuchi			Entered into the 28th Moscow International Film Festival
Sayonara Midori-chan	Tomoyuki Furumaya			
Shinobi: Heart Under Blade				
Strange Circus				
A Stranger of Mine				
Summer Time Machine Blues
Tetsujin 28: The Movie	Shin Togashi			Based on a manga
The Prince of Tennis - The Two Samurai: The First Game				
Tomie: Beginning				
Tomie: Revenge				
xxxHolic: A Midsummer Night's Dream	Tsutomu Mizushima	Jun Fukuyama, Sayaka Ohara	Anime	Based on a manga
Yaji and Kita: The Midnight Pilgrims				
