= List of Japanese films of 2006 =

A list of films released in Japan in 2006 (see 2006 in film).

== Highest-grossing films ==
Rank	Title	Gross
1	Tales from Earthsea	¥7.65 billion
2	Limit of Love: Umizaru	¥7.10 billion
3	Suite Dreams	¥6.08 billion
4	Sinking of Japan	¥5.34 billion
5	Death Note 2: The Last Name	¥5.20 billion
6	Yamato	¥5.09 billion
7	Pokémon Ranger and the Temple of the Sea	¥3.40 billion
8	Doraemon: Nobita's Dinosaur 2006	¥3.28 billion
9	Tears for You	¥3.10 billion
10	Detective Conan: The Private Eyes' Requiem	¥3.03 billion

== List of films ==
Title	Director	Cast	Genre	Notes
Atagoal: Cat's Magical Forest	Mizuho Nishikubo	Kōichi Yamadera; Asahi Uchida	Anime	
Big Tit Sisters: Blow Through the Valley aka Three Rules to be the Witch	Yumi Yoshiyuki	Sakurako Kaoru	Pink love comedy	7th Best Film of the year at the Pink Grand Prix
BLEACH the Movie: Memories of Nobody	Noriyuki Abe		Supernatural/action/anime	Based on a manga/anime series created by Tite Kubo
Boys Love	Kotaro Terauchi	Yoshikazu Kotani; Takumi Saito		
Boukenger the Movie: The Greatest Precious				
Crayon Shin-chan: Dance! Amigo!				
Death Note	Shūsuke Kaneko	Tatsuya Fujiwara; Kenichi Matsuyama; Nakamura Shidō; Erika Toda	Detective fiction, Drama	
Death Note 2: The Last Name	Shūsuke Kaneko	Tatsuya Fujiwara; Kenichi Matsuyama; Nakamura Shidō; Erika Toda	Detective fiction, Drama	
Detective Conan: The Private Eyes' Requiem				
Fascinating Young Hostess: Sexy Thighs	Tetsuya Takehora	Akiho Yoshizawa	Pink	Best Film, Screenplay, Cinematography and third Best Actress at the Pink Grand Prix
Gamera the Brave			Kaiju	First (and currently only) Millennium era Gamera film.
The Girl Who Leapt Through Time	Mamoru Hosoda		Anime	
Hula Girls	Sang-il Lee	Yasuko Matsuyuki; Etsushi Toyokawa; Yū Aoi; Shizuyo Yamazaki	Comedy, Drama	Winner of five major awards at the 2007 Japan Academy Awards, including best film, best director, best screenplay, best supporting actress (for Yū Aoi), and most popular film.
The Inugamis	Kon Ichikawa			Entered into the 29th Moscow International Film Festival
Japan Sinks	Shinji Higuchi	Tsuyoshi Kusanagi; Kou Shibasaki; Etsushi Toyokawa; Mao Daichi	Disaster film	
Letters from Iwo Jima				
Kamen Rider Kabuto: GOD SPEED LOVE				
Kamome Shokudo				
Nana 2	Kentarō Ōtani	Yui Ichikawa; Mika Nakashima		
Naruto the Movie 3: The Animal Riot of Crescent Moon Island				
Oira Sukeban	Noboru Iguchi			Based on a manga
One Piece the Movie: The Giant Mechanical Soldier of Karakuri Castle		Mayumi Tanaka, Kazuya Nakai, Akemi Okamura, Kappei Yamaguchi, Hiroaki Hirata, Ikue Ōtani, Yuriko Yamaguchi		
Paprika	Satoshi Kon		Science fiction anime	
Poketto Monsutā Adobansu Jenerēshon Pokémon Renjā and the Prince of the Sea, Manafi				
The Prince of Tennis	Yuichi Abe	Kanata Hongo, Yuu Shirota, Hirofumi Araki, Hiroki Suzuki	School, Sports	
Rainbow Song	Naoto Kumazawa	Hayato Ichihara, Juri Ueno, Ami Suzuki, Yū Aoi, Kuranosuke Sasaki		
Retribution	Kiyoshi Kurosawa	Kōji Yakusho, Manami Konishi, Tsuyoshi Ihara	Horror film	
Rokkasho Rhapsody	Hitomi Kamanaka		Documentary	
Rough	Kentarō Ōtani		Romantic comedy, School, Sports	
Tada, Kimi wo Aishiteru	Takehiko Shinjo	Aoi Miyazaki; Hiroshi Tamaki; Meisa Kuroki	Romance, Drama	International title: "Heavenly Forest"
Taiyou no uta	Norihiro Koizumi	YUI; Takashi Tsukamoto	Drama	
Oh! Oku	Toru Hayashi	Yukie Nakama; Hidetoshi Nishijima; Reiko Takashima	History	
Tales from Earthsea	Gorō Miyazaki		Fantasy anime	
Tekkon Kinkreet	Michael Arias	Kazunari Ninomiya, Yū Aoi	Science fiction anime	
The Angel's Egg	Shin Togashi	Manami Konishi		Based on a novel
Tokyo Friends: The Movie				
Ultraman Mebius & Ultraman Brothers	Kazuya Konaka	Shunji Igarashi, Daisuke Watanabe, Minoru Tanaka		
Uncle's Paradise	Shinji Imaoka	Shirō Shimomoto; Minami Aoyama	Pink comedy	Best Actor and Actress, Pink Grand Prix
Water Flower	Yusuke Kinoshita			Screened at Berlin International Film Festival 2006
We Can't Go Home Again	Toshi Fujiwara			
