= Pinky Ribbon Awards =

Japanese erotic cinema awards

The Pinky Ribbon Awards (ピンキーリボン賞, Pinkiiribon shō) are a Japanese cinema awards ceremony which recognizes excellence in the pink film genre. The award is held by Pink Link (ぴんくりんく), a Kansai region paper covering the pink film industry. Readers of the paper elect the winners of the awards, which have been held annually since 2004. Honors go to the best three films of the year—Gold, Silver and Pearl awards—and to the best actresses. Actress awards are Best Actress, Best Supporting Actress, Best New Actress, and since 2006, Outstanding Performance by an Actress.

== 2004 ==
Award	Film	Studio	Director	Cast
Gold	Housekeeper with Beautiful Skin: Made Wet with Finger Torture 美肌家政婦 指責め濡らして; Mihada Kaseifu: Yubi Zeme Nurashite	OP Eiga	Tarō Araki	Mayu Asada
Silver	Uniform Beauty: Shag Me Teacher! 制服美少女 先生あたしを抱いて; Seifuku bishōjo: Sensei atashi wo daite	Kokuei / Shintōhō Eiga	Hidekazu Takahara	Sora Aoi
Pearl (tie)	Aspiring Home Tutor: Soiled Pure Whiteness 憧れの家庭教師 汚された純白; Akogare no kateikyōshi: yogosareta junbaku	OP Eiga	Yumi Yoshiyuki	Mai Sakurazuki; Yumika Hayashi; Yumi Yoshiyuki
Pearl (tie)	食堂のお姉さん 淫乱にじみ汁; Shokudō no o neesan inran ni jimi jiru	OP Eiga	Tarō Araki	Mayu Asada; Kyōko Kazama
Pearl (tie)	Bitter Sweet 濃厚不倫 とられた女; Nōkō furin torareta onna	Kokuei / Shintōhō Eiga	Mitsuru Meike	Konatsu; Yumika Hayashi
Pearl (tie)	Married Couple Swap Night: My Wife and Your Husband 夫婦交換<スワップ>前夜 私の妻とあなたの奥さん; Fūfu kōkan zenya: watashi no tsuma to anata no okusan	Shintōhō Eiga	Daisuke Goto	Kyōko Natsume

- Best Actress: Mayu Asada
- Best Supporting Actress: Yumika Hayashi, Chinami Hayashida
- Best New Actress: Sora Aoi, Mai Sakurazuki, Konatsu, Kyōko Natsume

== 2005 ==
Award	Film	Studio	Director	Cast
Gold	Miss Peach: Peachy Sweetness Huge Breasts ミスピーチ 巨乳は桃の甘み; Misu Piichi: kyonyū wa momo no umami	OP Eiga	Yumi Yoshiyuki	Yumika Hayashi; Sakurako Kaoru
Silver	Huge Tits G-Cup: Rapturous Valley 爆乳Ｇカップ とろける谷間; Bakunyū G kappu: torokeru tanima	OP Eiga	Tarō Araki	Kazumi Hiraishi; Mayuko Sasaki; Motoko Sasaki
Pearl	外人妻×スケベな妹 丸見えエロ騒ぎ; Gaijin tsuma x sukebena imōto: marumie ero sawagi	OP Eiga	Mototsugu Watanabe	Minami Hoshikawa; Maria Hayashi; Minami Aoyama

- Best Actress: Yumika Hayashi
- Best Supporting Actress: Lemon Hanazawa
- Best New Actress: Mari Yamaguchi, Sakurako Kaoru, Komari Awashima, Erina Aoyama

== 2006 ==
Award	Film	Studio	Director	Cast
Gold	Fascinating Young Hostess: Sexy Thighs 悩殺若女将 色っぽい腰つき; Nōsatsu waka-okami: iroppoi koshitsuki	OP Eiga	Tetsuya Takehora	Akiho Yoshizawa
Silver	Mighty Extreme Woman 絶倫絶女; Zetsurin zetsujo	Kokuei / Shintōhō Eiga	Shinji Imaoka	Shirō Shimomoto; Minami Aoyama
Pearl	Three Naked Sisters: Lewdness 裸の三姉妹 淫交; Hadaka no Sanshimai: Inkō	Shintōhō Eiga	Yasufumi Tanaka	Mayu Asada; Sakurako Kaoru

- Best Actress: Akiho Yoshizawa
- Best Supporting Actress: Kyōko Kazama
- Outstanding Performance by an Actress: Erina Aoyama, Komari Awashima, Rinako Hirasawa
- Best New Actress: Yuria Hidaka

== 2007 ==
Award	Film	Studio	Director	Cast
Gold	Molester's Train: Sensitive Fingers 痴漢電車 びんかん指先案内人; Chikan densha: binkan yubi saki annai nin	OP Eiga	Yoshikazu Katō	Miki Arakawa
Silver	Adultery Addiction: Sensual Daze 不倫中毒 官能のまどろみ; Furinchūdoku: kannō no madoromi	OP Eiga	Yumi Yoshiyuki	Sakurako Kaoru; Yumi Yoshiyuki
Pearl	淫 情 ～義母と三兄妹～ Injō ~gibo to san kyōdai~	Kokuei / Shintōhō Eiga	Rei Sakamoto	Yūichi Ishikawa; Hiroyuki Kaneko; Lemon Hanazawa

- Best Actress: Rinako Hirasawa
- Best Supporting Actress: Kyōko Kazama
- Outstanding Performance by an Actress: Lemon Hanazawa, Kiri Kōda
- Best New Actress: Rina Yūki

== 2008 ==
Award	Film	Studio	Director	Cast
Gold	超いんらん やればやるほどいい気持ち; Chō inran: yareba yaruhodo iikimochi	Shintōhō Eiga	Yutaka Ikejima	Yuria Hidaka; Kiri Kōda; Erina Aoyama
Silver	喪服の未亡人 ほしいの… Mofuku no mibōjin: hoshii no...	Kokuei / Shintōhō Eiga	Mamoru Watanabe	Komari Awashima, Tomohiro Okada
Pearl	半熟売春 糸ひく愛汁; Hanjuku baishun: itohiku aishiru	OP Eiga	Yutaka Ikejima	Yuria Hidaka, Mayuko Tanaka

- Best Actress: Maki Tomoda
- Best Supporting Actress: Kiri Kōda
- Best New Actress: Aya
- Outstanding Performance by an Actress: Komari Awashima, Yuria Hidaka

== 2009 ==
Award	Film	Studio	Director	Cast
Gold	いくつになってもやりたい不倫; Ikutsu ni Nattemo Yaritai Furin	Shintōhō Eiga	Rei Sakamoto (坂本 礼)	Mutsuo Yoshioka; Tsubasa Haruya; Fujino Miki; Daisuke Iijima; Yumeka Sasaki
Second	裸身の裏顔 ふしだらな愛; Rashin no Uragao: Fushidarana Ai	OP Eiga	Yumi Yoshiyuki	Amu; Miho Wakabayashi; Rina Yūki; Naoyuki Chiba; Kazu Itsuki
Second	エッチな襦袢 濡れ狂う太もも; Ecchi na Juban: Nure Kurū Futomomo	OP Eiga	Yutaka Ikejima	Yuria Hidaka; Nao Masaki; Yū Uehara; Takahiro Nomura
Second	わいせつ性楽園～おじさまと私～ Waisetsu Seirakuen: Ojisama to Watashi	OP Eiga	Naoyuki Tomomatsu	Reira Minatsuki; Yōko Satomi; Mari Yamaguchi; Masayoshi Nogami
Second	Maid-Droid 老人とラブドール 私が初潮になった時… Rōjin to Rabudōru: Watashi ga Shochō ni Natta Toki	Xces	Naoyuki Tomomatsu	Akiho Yoshizawa; Anri Suzuki; Mari Yamaguchi; Yōko Satomi
Second	本番オーディション やられっぱなし; Honban Ōdishon: Yarareppanashi	Shintōhō Eiga	Tsukasa Satō (佐藤吏)	Ami Natsui; Yuria Hidaka; Nao Okabe; Kōji Makimura
Second	熟女 淫らに乱れて; Jukujo: Midara ni Midarete	Shintōhō Eiga	Naokazu Chinzei (鎮西尚一)	Takeshi Itō; Kyōko Hayami; Hotaru; Fumio Moriya

- Note: Three-way tie for second-place this year. No Silver or Pearl awards given.
- Best Actress: Ami Natsui
- Best Supporting Actress: Minami Aoyama
- Best New Actress: Nao Masaki
- Outstanding Performance by an Actress: Riri Kōda, Mayuko Sasaki, Yuria Hidaka, Yumi Yoshiyuki

== 2010 ==
Gold-潮吹き花嫁の性白書(shiofuki hanayomeno seihakusyo)

- Best Actress: Kaho Kasumi

== Bibliography ==
- "もろもろ告知 (Various notices)" (in Japanese). Pinky Ribbon Award site. Archived from the original on 2009-06-07.
- "NEWS" (in Japanese). P.G. Web Site.
