= List of Japanese film directors =

This article is a list of Japanese film directors.

== A ==
- Yutaka Abe
- Masao Adachi
- Kyōko Aizome
- Masatoshi Akihara
- Keita Amemiya
- Tetsurō Amino
- Hiroshi Ando
- Hideaki Anno
- Shinji Aoyama
- Tarō Araki
- Genjiro Arato
- Mari Asato

== D ==
- Masanobu Deme
- Nobuhiro Doi

== F ==
- Kei Fujiwara
- Kinji Fukasaku
- Jun Fukuda
- Yasuo Furuhata
- Tomoyuki Furumaya

== G ==
- Hideo Gosha
- Heinosuke Gosho

== H ==
- Sachi Hamano
- Tsutomu Hanabusa
- Susumu Hani
- Masato Harada
- Yasuharu Hasebe
- Kazuhiko Hasegawa
- Ryusuke Hamaguchi
- Ryōsuke Hashiguchi
- Kaizo Hayashi
- Shinji Higuchi
- Hideyuki Hirayama
- Ryūichi Hiroki
- Ishirō Honda

== I ==
- Jun Ichikawa
- Kon Ichikawa
- Mako Idemitsu
- George Iida
- Takahiko Iimura
- Toshiharu Ikeda
- Kazuo Ikehiro
- Yutaka Ikejima
- Kaoru Ikeya
- Kunihiko Ikuhara
- Tadashi Imai
- Shohei Imamura
- Shinji Imaoka
- Hiroshi Inagaki
- Haruo Inoue
- Umetsugu Inoue
- Isshin Inudo
- Minoru Inuzuka
- Yu Irie
- Katsuhito Ishii
- Sōgo Ishii
- Takashi Ishii
- Teruo Ishii
- Yuya Ishii
- Kyōhei Ishiguro
- Noboru Ishiguro
- Hiroshi Ishikawa
- Itsumichi Isomura
- Juzo Itami
- Mansaku Itami
- Daisuke Itō
- Shunya Itō
- Shunji Iwai
- Yuki Iwata
- Shigeru Izumiya
- Kazuyuki Izutsu

== K ==
- Norimasa Kaeriyama
- Shusuke Kaneko
- Yoshikazu Katō
- Naomi Kawase
- Yūzō Kawashima
- Keisuke Kinoshita
- Teinosuke Kinugasa
- Ryuhei Kitamura
- Takeshi Kitano
- Masaki Kobayashi
- Satoru Kobayashi
- Takashi Koizumi
- Satoshi Kon
- Masaru Konuma
- Hirokazu Koreeda
- Seijirō Kōyama
- Eiichi Kudo
- Kei Kumai
- Tatsumi Kumashiro
- Minoru Kunizawa
- Kazuo Kuroki
- Akira Kurosawa
- Kiyoshi Kurosawa

== M ==
- Kunitoshi Manda
- Yasuzo Masumura
- Urara Matsubayashi
- Toshio Matsumoto
- Mitsuru Meike
- Mitsuhiro Mihara
- Takashi Miike
- Takahiro Miki
- Kenji Misumi
- Kōki Mitani
- Hayao Miyazaki
- Kenji Mizoguchi
- Yoshimitsu Morita
- Katsuyuki Motohiro
- Kan Mukai
- Ryū Murakami
- Minoru Murata

== N ==
- Kenji Nagasaki
- Shunichi Nagasaki
- Masahiko Nagasawa
- Sadao Nakajima
- Hiroyuki Nakano
- Tetsuya Nakashima
- Hideo Nakata
- Mikio Naruse
- Mika Ninagawa
- Giichi Nishihara
- Katsumi Nishikawa
- Miwa Nishikawa
- Yoshitaro Nomura

== O ==
- Mipo O
- Nobuhiko Obayashi
- Masayuki Ochiai
- Motoyoshi Oda
- Akira Ogata (film director)
- Shinsuke Ogawa
- Naoko Ogigami
- Kōhei Oguri
- Kōyū Ohara
- Kihachi Okamoto
- Eiji Okuda
- Shutaro Oku
- Kazuki Ōmori
- Tatsushi Ōmori
- Hideo Onchi
- Mamoru Oshii
- Nagisa Oshima
- Kentarō Ōtani
- Katsuhiro Otomo
- Keiichi Ozawa
- Yasujirō Ozu

== S ==
- Sabu (Tanaka Hiroyuki)
- Yoichi Sai (Choi Yang-il)
- Kōichi Saitō
- Torajiro Saito
- Junji Sakamoto
- Kazuhiro Sano
- Hirohisa Sasaki
- Hisayasu Satō
- Junya Sato
- Shimako Satō
- Toshiki Satō
- Yūichi Satō
- Kōji Seki
- Kazuyoshi Sekine
- Makoto Shinkai
- Yasujirō Shimazu
- Hiroshi Shimizu
- Takashi Shimizu
- Kaneto Shindo
- Kōji Shiraishi
- Masahiro Shinoda
- Tetsuo Shinohara
- Makoto Shinozaki
- Akihiko Shiota
- Shinji Sōmai
- Chūsei Sone
- Sion Sono
- Masayuki Suo
- Nobuhiro Suwa
- Seijun Suzuki

== T ==
- Yūji Tajiri
- Yoichi Takabayashi
- Gō Takamine
- Lisa Takeba
- Tetsuji Takechi
- Tetsuya Takehora
- Yōjirō Takita
- Yuki Tanada
- Eizō Tanaka
- Kinuyo Tanaka
- Noboru Tanaka
- Tomotaka Tasaka
- Shūji Terayama
- Hiroshi Teshigahara
- Shirō Toyoda
- Toshiaki Toyoda
- Eiji Tsuburaya
- Yutaka Tsuchiya
- Shinya Tsukamoto

== U ==
- Kenji Uchida
- Tomu Uchida
- Toshiya Ueno
- Kirio Urayama
- Kiyohiko Ushihara

== W ==
- Kōji Wakamatsu
- Mamoru Watanabe

== Y ==
- Takeshi Yagi
- Yamada Yoji
- Kazuhiko Yamaguchi
- Masashi Yamamoto
- Satsuo Yamamoto
- Sadao Yamanaka
- Takashi Yamazaki
- Mitsuo Yanagimachi
- Daihachi Yoshida
- Keisuke Yoshida
- Kōta Yoshida
- Yoshishige Yoshida
- Isao Yukisada
- Yumi Yoshiyuki

== Z ==
- Takahisa Zeze
