= Kyōko Kazama =

Japanese AV idol and pink film actress (born 1974)

- 風間今日子 or 風間恭子
- Born: January 12, 1974 (age 52); Tokyo, Japan
- Height: 1.56 m (5 ft 1 1/2 in)

Kyōko Kazama (Japanese: 風間今日子 or 風間恭子, Hepburn: Kazama Kyōko) is a Japanese AV idol and pink film actress. She has appeared in award-winning pink films, and was herself given a "Best Supporting Actress" award in two successive years for her work in this genre in 2006 and 2007.

== Life and career ==
Kyōko Kazama was born in Tokyo on January 12, 1974. She first became known in the mid-1990s as an AV idol. In AV profiles, her birthday is reported as February 20, 1977, and the kanji used to spell her name is "風間恭子". In the shift from focus on AV work to pink film theatrical releases she uses "風間今日子". Both versions of her name are pronounced "Kazama Kyōko". Among the prominent AV studios at which Kazama has performed are Alice Japan, Dogma, and, more recently, the MILF (熟女jukujo)-specialist Madonna studio. Kazama was one of the early AV idols associated with the Attackers studio, and has continued to appear in videos for the studio throughout her career. In September 2005 she appeared in the Attacker's AV Slave Island which won the Attackers Award at the 2005 Moodyz Awards.

Kazama made her pink film debut in 1997, and has appeared in films directed by the most prominent filmmakers in the genre, including Satoru Kobayashi, the director of Flesh Market (1962), the first pink film. She often plays "bad girl" roles in films, but the Shintōhō Eiga studio site describes her, in life, as "a shy, kind, and friendly woman". Besides several films with Kobayashi, Kazama has also worked with directors Yutaka Ikejima, Tarō Araki, Tetsuya Takehora, and Toshiki Satō. In Satō's satire of the pink film profession, Woman of the House: Going to the Class Reunion aka Tokyo Booty Nights (2004), pink veterans Yōta Kawase and Yumeka Sasaki were cast as a married couple of pink film performers. Kazama played the role of a sex-film actress, with director Mitsuru Meike in a cameo as her henpecked husband. During filming, Yōta Kawase's director demands that he perform "honban"—actual sex—with Kazama for a more realistic scene. Kawase demands to know why Kazama should be paid more than himself for the performance, and the director replies, "Because no one is looking at the guy."

By 2002, known as a leading actress in the pink film, the main feature of issue #93 of the pink film journal P*G was an interview with Kazama. Since 1994 P*G has been the leading journal on the pink film, and is the host of the Pink Grand Prix, the major awards ceremony for the genre.

Kazama has also acted in films by female directors in the pink film genre, Sachi Hamano, Yumi Yoshiyuki, and Kyōko Aizome. For the Shintōhō Eiga studio, she appeared in Whore Hospital, the first in a series of films also known as "Pink Salon Hospital", directed by Hamano credited as "Chise Matoba". The film was given Honorable Mention at the 1997 Pink Grand Prix awards. Kazama returned for the fourth film in the series, also directed by Hamano. In 2001 she appeared in director Hamano's Lily Festival (2001), a film about sexuality among senior citizens. The film was given the Best Feature Film award at the Philadelphia International Gay & Lesbian Film Festival in 2003. Known for her prominent bustline, Kazama co-starred with the buxom Sakurako Kaoru in Yoshikawa's Big Tit Sisters: Blow Through the Valley (2006). The film was named the seventh best pink release of the year at the Pink Grand Prix, and the sixth best by walkerplus.com. At the Kansai region Pinky Ribbon Awards, Kazama was named Best Supporting Actress for her work in the pink film in 2006 and 2007.

Kazama joined with actresses Akiho Yoshizawa, Mihiro and Lemon Hanazawa for the Edo period historical costume drama, The Inner Palace: Indecent War, in July 2006. A sequel The Inner Palace: Flower of War came out in August of the same year. Both videos were released by the AV studio Max-A in hardcore versions under their DoraMax label and also as shorter softcore R-15 rated versions for the Pure Max label.

== Bibliography ==
=== English ===
- Kyôko Kazama at IMDb
- "風間今日子 かざま・きょうこ". SHIN-TOHO. Archived from the original on 2008-02-28.
- "Kyoko Kazama 風間恭子 ( Actress )". Urabon Navigator 1997-2006.

=== Japanese ===
- "風間恭子 ( かざまきょうこ ) (Attackers profile and filmography)" (in Japanese). www.attackers.net. Archived from the original on August 31, 2004.
- 風間今日子 かざま・きょうこ (in Japanese). allcinema.net.
- "風間今日子（かざまきょうこ） (Profile and filmography)" (in Japanese). www.dmm.co.jp.
- 風間恭子 (in Japanese). Japanese Movie Database.

== Notes ==
Awards and achievements
Pinky Ribbon Awards
Preceded by Lemon Hanazawa	Pinky Ribbon Awards for Best Supporting Actress; Kyōko Kazama; 2006	Succeeded by Kyōko Kazama
Preceded by Kyōko Kazama	Pinky Ribbon Awards for Best Supporting Actress; Kyōko Kazama; 2007	Succeeded by Kiri Kōda
