= Konatsu (actress) =

Japanese pink film actress (born 1982)

- Born: January 14, 1982 (age 44); Nagano Prefecture, Japan
- Website: http://konatsu.seesaa.net/

Konatsu (向夏) is a Japanese pink film actress. She has appeared in award-winning pink films, and was herself given a "Best Actress" award for her work in this genre in 2005.

== Life and career ==
Konatsu was born in Japan's Nagano Prefecture in 1982. After graduating from junior college, she moved to Tokyo where she worked in the beauty industry and did some gravure modeling in 2003. She made her acting debut in the July 2004 V-cinema production Forbidden Fruit (禁断の果実, Kindan no kajitsu) directed by Yuji Tajiri.

Konatsu had her film debut in director Mototsugu Watanabe's Beppin kyōshi: toiki no aibu (べっぴん教師 吐息の愛撫) (2004). Her first leading role was later that same year, in Mitsuru Meike's Bitter Sweet.

January 14, 2006, the premiere date of Shinji Imaoka's Paid Companionship Story: Girls Who Want to Do It (援助交際物語 したがるオンナたち, Enjo-kōsai monogatari: shitagaru onna-tachi) aka Frog Song, was also Konatsu's birthday. The director and staff presented Konatsu with a surprise birthday cake on stage at the occasion. The film was named the best pink release for 2005, and Konatsu was given the award for Best Actress for her performance.

She gave birth to her first child in February 2007; as of 2011, she was working for a "well-known clothing company".

== Filmography ==
- Beppin kyōshi: toiki no aibu (べっぴん教師 吐息の愛撫) (September 2004)
- Bitter Sweet (October 2004)
- Paid Companionship Story: Girls Who Want to Do It (June 2005)
- Blind Love (August 2005)
- Ikusa (戦 ＩＫＵＳＡ) (October 2005)
- Tokyo Zombie (December 2005)
- Riaru men: Sutando! (リアルメン・スタンド！) (January 2006)

== Bibliography ==
=== English ===
- Konatsu at IMDb

=== Japanese ===
- 向夏 こなつ (in Japanese). allcinema.net.
- "進化する女優・向夏と傑作ピンクの甘い誘惑 (Evolving Actress: Konatsu and the Sweet Temptation of Pink Art)" (in Japanese). www.walkerplus.com. 2005-11-30.
- "新着情報―ピンク映画女優 向夏さんに独占インタビュー (Interview with Konatsu)" (in Japanese). www.otoshin.jp. 2005-11-25. Archived from the original on 2007-01-24.

Awards and achievements
Pink Grand Prix
Preceded by Yumika Hayashi for Lunch Box	Pink Grand Prix for Best Actress; Konatsu; 2005 for Paid Companionship Story: Girls Who Want to Do It	Succeeded by Minami Aoyama for Uncle's Paradise
Pinky Ribbon Awards
Preceded by New Award	Pinky Ribbon Award for Best New Actress; Konatsu; 2004; With: Sora Aoi; Mai Sakurazuki; Kyōko Natsume	Succeeded by Mari Yamaguchi; Sakurako Kaoru; Komari Awashima; Erina Aoyama
