= Lemon Hanazawa =

Japanese pink film actress

- 華沢レモン
- Born: July 17, 1984 (age 42); Hyōgo, Japan
- Other name: Remon Hanazawa
- Height: 1.59 m (5 ft 2 1/2 in)

Lemon Hanazawa (Japanese: 華沢レモン, Hepburn: Hanazawa Lemon; born July 17, 1984), a.k.a. Remon Hanazawa, is a Japanese pink film actress who has also performed in adult videos (AV). She has appeared in award-winning pink films such as Lunch Box (2004) and Molester's Train: Sensitive Fingers (2007). She was named "Best New Actress" for her work in this genre in 2004, and "Best Actress" second place in 2005 at the Pink Grand Prix. The Kansai region Pinky Ribbon Awards chose Hanazawa for Best Supporting Actress in 2005, and Outstanding Performance by an Actress in 2007.

== Career ==
Hanazawa began working in adult videos at least as early as December 2003 when she took part in the "train molester" video Chikan deruta haji tai (痴漢デルタ恥帯) for the Starboard (スターボード) studio. In May 2004, she appeared with Sakura Sakurada in the lesbian-themed Female-Littered Lesbian Neruton (女だらけのレズねるとん) for the Moodyz studio and has also performed in a number of other adult videos for various studios.

Hanazawa made her pink film debut in Shinji Imaoka's Lunch Box (March 2004), which was selected as Best Film at the 2004 Pink Grand Prix. In the film, Hanazawa plays the role of one of star Yumika Hayashi's co-workers and sexual rivals. Her performance in this film earned her a "Best New Actress" award at the 2004 Pink Grand Prix, beating popular AV idol Sora Aoi, who had also made her pink film debut that year. During 2004 Hanazawa performed in 20 of these theatrical pink film releases. Her performance in Akira Katō's Teacher with Beautiful Skin: Big Tit Vibe-Torture (2005), earned her the Best Actress, 2nd place award at the 2005 Pink Grand Prix ceremony.

In his book Behind the Pink Curtain: The Complete History of Japanese Sex Cinema, Jasper Sharp uses one of Hanazawa's scenes in Yutaka Ikejima's Family Gets Rude Chapter 1: Perverts' Fun (2004) to illustrate the creative means pink film directors employ to suggest more than is legally possible in Japanese softcore pornography. Hanazawa masturbates in a scene that Sharp characterizes as "pretty lewd", yet she is seen only in soft focus in the background. The foreground focus of the camera is a bouquet of flowers, behind which the masturbating Hanazawa moans, "Look at my flower!"

Besides Imaoka and Ikejima, other major pink film directors in whose films Hanazawa has appeared include Toshiki Satō (Tokyo Booty Nights, 2004), Tetsuya Takehora (Peep Show, 2004), Yumi Yoshiyuki, Sachi Hamano, and Yoshikazu Katō. Katō's Molester's Train: Sensitive Fingers (2007) gave Hanazawa a second appearance in a Pink Grand Prix Best Film-winner. The film was also given the Gold Prize at the Pinky Ribbon Awards.

Hanazawa also appeared with Kyōko Kazama, Akiho Yoshizawa and Mihiro in the Edo period historical costume drama, The Inner Palace: Indecent War, in July 2006. A sequel The Inner Palace: Flower of War came out in August of the same year. The two videos were released by AV studio Max-A in hardcore versions under their DoraMax label and also shorter softcore R-15 rated versions for the Pure Max label.

In February 2008, Hanazawa had a supporting role in the mainstream horror film Rika: The Zombie Killer starring Risa Kudō. The movie, described by one reviewer as an "outrageously silly film", was released on DVD with English subtitles in September 2009. Hanazawa was one of several colleagues and friends who appeared in Korean-Japanese director Tetsuaki Matsue's 2009 documentary on Yumika Hayashi, Annyeong Yumika (あんにょん由美香, An nyon Yumika).

== Partial filmography ==
Title	Release date	Director	Studio	Notes
Lunch Box a.k.a. Mature Woman: Rutting Ball-Play 熟女・発情 タマしゃぶり たまもの; Jukujo: hatsujo tamashaburi Tamamono	2004-03-09	Shinji Imaoka	Kokuei / Shintōhō Eiga / V-Theater 135	Best Film, Pink Grand Prix
Family Gets Rude Chapter 1: Perverts' Fun 淫乱なる一族 第一章 痴人たちの戯れ; Inran naru ichizoku: dai-isshō - chijin-tachi no tawamure	2004-04-23	Yutaka Ikejima	Cement Match / Shintōhō Eiga	63 min.
Woman of the House: Going to the Class Reunion a.k.a. Tokyo Booty Nights 団地の奥さん、同窓会に行く; Danchi no okusan, dōsōkai ni iku	2004-06-08	Toshiki Satō	Kokuei / Shintōhō Eiga / V-Theater 135	63 min. With Yumeka Sasaki, Yōta Kawase, Takeshi Itō, Mitsuru Meike, Kyōko Kazama, and Shirō Shimomoto
Family Gets Rude Chapter 2: Unequalled Limits 淫乱なる一族 第二章 絶倫の果てに; Inran naru ichizoku: dai-nishō - zetsurin no hate ni	2004-06-25	Yutaka Ikejima	Cement Match / Shintōhō Eiga	60 min.
Peep Show a.k.a. Married Wife's Secret: Peeping and Peeped At 人妻の秘密 覗き覗かれ; Hitozuma no himitsu: nozoki nozokare	2004-09-06	Tetsuya Takehora	Ogawa Planning / OP Eiga	60 min. Tetsuya Takehora's directorial debut With Kyōko Kazama
Wife Taxi: Crowded with Big Tits 人妻タクシー 巨乳に乗り込め; Hitozuma Takushii: Kyonyū ni Norikomu	2004-09-29	Yutaka Ikejima	Cement Match; OP Eiga	Honorable Mention, Pink Grand Prix
The Slit-Mouthed Woman 官能病棟 濡れた赤い唇＜ｋｕｃｈｉｓａｋｅ 口裂け＞ Kannō byōtō: nureta akai kuchibiru: kuchisake	2005-01-28	Yukihisa Higuchi; Takaaki Hashiguchi	Shintōhō Eiga	63 min. With Minami Aoyama, Kyōko Kazama and Hotaru Hazuki
Teacher with Beautiful Skin: Big Tit Vibe-Torture 美肌教師 巨乳バイブ責め; Bihada kyōshi: kyonyū baibu zeme	2005-11-11	Yoshikazu Katō	加藤映像工房 / OP Eiga	61 min. Hanazawa won Best Actress, Silver Prize, Pink Grand Prix; Best New Actress, 4th Place, Pink Grand Prix: Aki Yafuji
Chikan Densha: Suggestive Indecent Hips 痴漢電車 挑発する淫ら尻; Chikan Densha: Chohatsusuru Midara Shiri	2005-11-29	Naoyuki Tomomatsu	Shintōhō Eiga	Pink Grand Prix: Best Film, Bronze Prize
Japonica Virus ジャポニカ・ウイルス	2006-09-30	Yu Irie	Biotide	Sci-fi drama 94 min.
Molester's Train: Sensitive Fingers a.k.a. Hiroko and Hiroshi 痴漢電車 びんかん指先案内人; Chikan densha: binkan yubi saki annai nin	2007-08-10	Yoshikazu Katō	OP Eiga	Best Film, Pink Grand Prix; Gold Prize, Pinky Ribbon Awards
Best Friend's Wife: The Black Panties of a Secret Rendezvous 親友の妻 密会の黒下着; Shinyū no Tsuma: Mikkai no Kuroshitagi	2007-08-01	Yutaka Ikejima	Cement Match; OP Eiga	6th Best Film, Pink Grand Prix; With Maki Tomoda and Riri Kōda
Rika: The Zombie Killer a.k.a. Zombie Hunter Rika 最強兵器女子高生 ＲＩＫＡ; Saikyō heiki joshikōsei: Rika	2008-02-18	Ken'ichi Fujiwara	GP Museum	Zombie horror 86 min.
Annyeong Yumika あんにょん由美香; An nyon Yumika	2009-07-11	Tetsuaki Matsue	Spotted Productions	Documentary on Yumika Hayashi; 119 min.

== Bibliography ==
=== English ===
- Lemon Hanazawa at IMDb
- "Remon Hanazawa 華沢レモン (Actress )". Urabon Navigator 1997-2006.

=== Japanese ===
- 華沢レモン はなざわ・れもん (in Japanese). allcinema.net.
- "華沢レモン（はなざわれもん） (Profile and filmography)" (in Japanese). www.dmm.co.jp.
- 華沢レモン (in Japanese). Japanese Movie Database.
- 華沢レモン( 出演 ) (in Japanese). Kinema Junpo. Archived from the original on 2011-10-07.
- 華沢レモン ハナザワレモン (in Japanese). www.walkerplus.com.

Awards and achievements
Pink Grand Prix
Preceded by Machiko Mai for ノーパン秘書 悶絶社長室	Pink Grand Prix for Best New Actress; Lemon Hanazawa; 2004 for Lunch Box	Succeeded by Kyōko Natsume for Coming Out
Pinky Ribbon Awards
Preceded by Yumika Hayashi	Pinky Ribbon Award for Best Supporting Actress; Lemon Hanazawa; 2005	Succeeded by Kyōko Kazama
Preceded by Erina Aoyama	Outstanding Performance by an Actress; Lemon Hanazawa; 2007	Succeeded by Komari Awashima
