= Ambiguous (film) =

- DVD cover
- Directed by: Toshiya Ueno
- Written by: Hidekazu Takahara Asako Ôtake; Yumiko Kikuchi Yui Yoshimizu
- Produced by: Daisuke Asakura Nakato Kinukawa; Kyôichi Masuko; Kazuhito Morita Haruki Wakata
- Starring: Hidehisa Ebata Noriko Murayama; Nikki Sasaki; Minami Aoyama; Akio Kurauchi; Yôta Kawase; Suzuka Takaki Mika Ogawa
- Cinematography: Yasumasa Konishi
- Production company: Kokuei
- Distributed by: Shintōhō Eiga
- Release date: December 9, 2003
- Running time: 63 min.
- Country: Japan
- Language: Japanese

Ambiguous (曖昧, Aimai) also known as Waisetsu Netto Shūdan Ikasete!! (猥褻ネット集団 いかせて!!) and Group Suicide: The Last Supper (集団自殺 最後の晩餐, Shūdan Jissatsu: Saigo no Bansan) is a 2003 Japanese Pink film directed by Toshiya Ueno. It was chosen as Best Film of the year at the Pink Grand Prix ceremony.

== Plot ==
A diverse group of people, all with troubles in their daily lives, meet online and decide to commit suicide together. Isolated from society at large, they form a physical bond as the appointed time approaches.

== Cast ==
- Hidehisa Ebata as Hanko
- Noriko Murayama as Maria/Michiko Sano
- Nikki Sasaki as Screen/Mamiko Yoshida
- Minami Aoyama as Myû/Kazuki Aikawa
- Akio Kurauchi as Innocent/Yutaka Matsunaga
- Yôta Kawase as Yukio Sano
- Suzuka Takaki as Miyuki
- Mika Ogawa as Ami
- Rie Sumiyoshi as Matsunaga's mother
- Shirô Shimomoto as Shop Owner
- Takeshi Itô as Shop Worker
- Kinuta as Fat Woman

== Reception ==
Anglophone pink film scholar Jasper Sharp notes that there are two different audiences for contemporary pink films: The traditional pink theater-goer who is generally interested in seeing sex on the screen, and the devotees of pink cinema represented by such publications as P*G magazine and its website. As with many of Kokuei's pink films, Ambiguous did not prove very marketable for the traditional softcore porn audience, in part because of its downbeat subject matter. However, when looked at as a film which happens to include sex scenes—Kokuei's approach to the pink genre—Sharp writes Obscene Internet Group "stands as one of the most genuinely insightful and of-the-moment films produced within the Japanese independent sector in its year."

The readers of P*G magazine showed their approval of the film by awarding it Best Film and giving Hidekazu Takahara the Silver Prize for screenplay.

== Release ==
Like many pink films, Ambiguous has gone under more than one title. Originally released in theatres as Obscene Internet Group: Make Me Come!!, the film was shown at the Pink Grand Prix under the title Ambiguous, the title under which it was also released on DVD in Japan and internationally.

== Home media ==
The film has also been released on DVD in Japan as Group Suicide: The Last Supper. Sacrament released the film as "Ambiguous" on English-subtitled Region 2 DVD on 22 February 2006.

== Bibliography ==
=== English ===
- Apple, Mandi. "Ambiguous review". / www.mandiapple.com.
- Sharp, Jasper (2008). Behind the Pink Curtain: The Complete History of Japanese Sex Cinema. Guildford: FAB Press. pp. 309–11, 364. ISBN 978-1-903254-54-7.
- Sharp, Jasper. "Midnight Eye Round-Up: Pink Films special : Obscene Internet Group: Make Me Come!!". www.midnighteye.com. Archived from the original on 10 May 2009.

=== Japanese ===
- 集団自殺 最後の晩餐(2003) (in Japanese). allcinema.net.
- 曖昧 (in Japanese). www.dmm.co.jp.
- 猥褻ネット集団 いかせて!! (in Japanese). P.G. Web Site. Archived from the original on 2011-06-05.
- 猥褻ネット集団 いかせて！！ (in Japanese). Japanese Movie Database.

Preceded by A Saloon Wet with Beautiful Women	Pink Grand Prix for Best Film; 2003	Succeeded by Lunch Box
