= Minami Aoyama =

Japanese pink film actress and AV idol (born 1982)

- 藍山みなみ
- Born: May 28, 1982 (age 43); Tokyo, Japan
- Height: 1.55 m (5 ft 1 in)

Minami Aoyama (Japanese: 藍山みなみ, Hepburn: Aoyama Minami) is a Japanese former pink film actress and AV idol. She appeared in award-winning pink films, and was herself given a Best Actress award for her work in this genre in 2006.

== Life and career ==
Minami Aoyama was born in Tokyo on May 28, 1982 and began her career as an adult video (AV) actress in 2003 at the age of 21. She made her pink film debut that same year in director Toshiya Ueno's Ambiguous (December 2003), which was the winner of the Best Film award at the Pink Grand Prix. In October 2004, she appeared with AV idol Sora Aoi in the mainstream revenge film Stop the Bitch Campaign: Hell Version (援助交際撲滅運動 地獄変, Enjo-kōsai bokumetsu undō: jigoku-hen) directed by Kōsuke Suzuki. Aoyama had a featured role alongside Mayu Asada and Lemon Hanazawa in the September 2005 J-horror pink film The Slit-Mouthed Woman (kuchisake 口裂け, Kuchisake), also known as Kannō byōtō: nureta akai kuchibiru, based on the Japanese urban legend of the Kuchisake-onna.

As an AV actress, Aoyama was nominated for the Best Actress Award at the 2006 Adult Broadcasting Awards ceremony for her work on the Japanese adult satellite TV network SKY PerfecTV! in 2005. Among her more prominent pink film performances was in Shinji Imaoka's Uncle's Paradise, released in May 2006. At the annual Pink Grand Prix, the film was chosen as the eighth best pink release of the year, and Aoyama was given an award as Best Actress. Aoyama was one of the leads in the 2006 mainstream romantic fantasy Cat Girl Kiki (萌えキュン@MOVIE 猫耳少女キキ, Nekomimi shojo Kiki), which was also released in the United States in May 2007.

Aoyama announced her retirement from AV work at the June 2007 event Momotaro Night 2007! (桃太郎Night！2007) held in Shinjuku, Tokyo. Her retirement was marked by simultaneous releases of videos from the Momotaro and Attackers studios on June 7, 2007 and a special photo session appearance by Aoyama for Attackers.

After her retirement from adult videos, Aoyama continued to make pink films including starring roles in the 2008 Nakagawa Jun Kyōju no Inbina Hibi with Rinako Hirasawa, and director Yoshikazu Katō's November 2009 film Tsubo Hime Sōpu: Nuru Hada de Urazeme (壺姫ソープ ぬる肌で裏責め), which won the Best Film at the Pink Grand Prix for 2009. Aoyama was also named Best Actress, 2nd place for her performance in this film. Also in 2009, Aoyama won the Best Supporting Actress prize at the Pinky Ribbon Awards.

In addition to appearances on television and in V-cinema, Aoyama also joined "Gesshoku Kagekidan", an avant-garde theatrical group, and in August 2008 performed in a play by Shūji Terayama. In April 2011, Aoyama co-starred with Nao Ayukawa in director Yoshikazu Katō's pink film Kateikyōshi to mibōjin gibo: Masaguri kyōen (家庭教師と未亡人義母 まさぐり狂宴) and soon afterwards she announced her retirement from the entertainment business and closed her official blog as of June 2011.

== Partial filmography ==
- Ambiguous (December 2003)
- Bitter Sweet (October 2004)
- Uncle's Paradise (May 2006)
- Nakagawa Jun Kyōju no Inbina Hibi (March 2008)

Awards and achievements
Pink Grand Prix
Preceded by Konatsu for Paid Companionship Story: Girls Who Want to Do It	Pink Grand Prix for Best Actress; Minami Aoyama; 2006 for Uncle's Paradise	Succeeded by Rinako Hirasawa for New Tokyo Decadence – The Slave
