= Kaoru Toyoda =

Japanese pornographic film director

- Born: November 10, 1952 (age 73); Japan
- Occupation: Film director
- Years active: 1985–

Kaoru Toyoda (豊田薫, Toyoda Kaoru) is a Japanese adult video (AV) director and the founder of two AV studios. With a career dating back to 1985, he is one of the pioneers of the Japanese adult video industry.

== Life and career ==
Toyoda was born on November 10, 1952. He made his adult video directorial debut with the Kuki company in May 1985 with the video Bunny Girl (少女うさぎ, Shōjo Usagi) starring Midori Takano (高野みどり). By the mid-1980s he was working for Samm (later to become h.m.p.), where he is credited along with others for changing the direction of that company from its early emphasis on S&M videos. One of the videos he directed for h.m.p. was the 1990 Kozenwaisetsu 7 starring early AV Idol Yumika Hayashi. He also directed videos for the Alice Japan studio in the 1990s.

=== Wild Side - King of Realism ===
Frustrated by the close censorship of Japanese adult videos under the Nihon Ethics of Video Association (NEVA), also known as "Viderin", the voluntary ethics group which regulated most of the AV companies in the 1980s and 1990s, Toyoda started up his own company using the label "King of Realism" (リア王, Ria Ō) in 1996. The company, Wild Side (ワイルドサイド, Wairudo Saido), located in Tokyo's Shibuya ward, was founded in April 1996 and "King of Realism" (the Japanese name also means "King Lear") began issuing videos in August 1996. In the years following other labels were also created including "Macbeth" (マクベス, Makubesu) in September 1997, "Ran" (乱, Ran) in July 1998, "Jun" (純, Jun) and "GOLD" in April 2000, "Cobra" (コブラ, Kobura) in November 2000, "D's" in January 2001 and "SILVIA" in October 2002.

The company issued about a dozen new videos per month including installments in such popular series as "Eromesu" (凌辱エロメス), "Royal Anal Kingdom" (名門アナル王国) and the scatology series "Exodus Gold" (エクソダス ゴールド). The major Japanese AV retailer DMM (part of the Hokuto Corporation) listed over 600 DVD titles and more than 500 VHS titles for Wild Side in mid-2010.

Throughout its history, Wild Side and the "King of Realism" label were associated with videos portraying scatology, anal sex, and in its later years pregnant sex. On November 12, 2004, Wild Side released the video Beautiful Nine Month Pregnant Woman Sex - Childbirth (臨月美女のSEX・出産 畑山夏樹) (DWI-01), directed by Toyoda and starring Natsuki Hatayama (or Hatakeyama) (畑山夏樹). The first part of the video shows the pregnant actress having sex with various actors but the second part depicts a complete sequence of her giving birth at home.

Other actresses who appeared in Toyoda-directed videos for Wild Side include Rinako Hirasawa, Chihiro Hara and Minami Aoyama.

=== Opera ===
After 20 years as an AV director, 10 years after starting the "King of Realism" label, and a false colon cancer scare, Toyoda closed Wild Side and started a new adult video company, Opera (オペラ, Opera), in October 2005. In September 2011, the DVD distributor DMM listed 327 titles for Opera on its website. Toyoda is the chief director at Opera and had directed some 150 videos for the studio by that same date.

For the 2009 AV Grand Prix competition, the Opera entry was the scatology video First Crap (初脱糞ハメスカ過糞症), directed by Toyoda and starring Chika Shinozaki.

== Sources ==
- "Kaoru Toyoda - Profile & Filmography at Urabon Navigator".
- "Kaoru Toyoda - Filmography at DMM" (in Japanese).
