= Tsumugi (film) =

- Poster to Tsumugi
- Directed by: Hidekazu Takahara
- Written by: Hidekazu Takahara
- Produced by: Daisuke Asakura
- Starring: Sora Aoi, Takashi Naha, Shigeru Nakano
- Edited by: Shoji Sakai
- Music by: Kentaro Nojima
- Production company: Kokuei / Shintōhō Eiga
- Distributed by: Shintōhō Eiga (Japan); PinkEiga Inc. (USA)
- Release date: July 27, 2004
- Running time: 61 minutes
- Country: Japan
- Language: Japanese

Tsumugi (つむぎ), or Uniform Beauty: Shag Me Teacher! (制服美少女 先生あたしを抱いて, Seifuku bishōjo: Sensei atashi wo daite) (2004) is a Japanese pink film directed by Hidekazu Takahara and starring Sora Aoi. It was released in the US as a DVD in July 2009.

== Synopsis ==
Tsumugi, a girl with a crush on her teacher, discovers that the teacher is having an affair with another teacher. Complications ensue after Tsumugi manages to attract her teacher, but then begins falling for a fellow student.

== Cast ==
- Sora Aoi... Tsumugi Miyamae
- Satoshi Kobayashi... Koshuke Yanagi
- Takashi Naha... Shinichi Katagiri
- Shigeru Nakano... Asu
- Chiyoko Sakamachi... Yoko Shimazaki

== Awards ==
Tsumugi was named fourth best pink film release for 2004 at the "Pink Academy Awards", the Pink Grand Prix. AV idol Sora Aoi was also given a "Best New Actress" award at the ceremony for her performance in this film.

== Availability ==
The film was first released theatrically in Japan on 27 July 2004. Pink Eiga Inc. released the DVD in the US on July 1, 2009 in two versions, a Standard and a Special Edition. The Special Edition contains a behind-the-scene feature, an interview with Sora Aoi, music clips and a 5.1 ch surround soundtrack.

Preceded by Irresistable Angel: Suck It All Up	Pink Grand Prix 4th Best Film; 2004	Succeeded by Lustful Hitchhiker: Sought Wife
Preceded by New Award	Pinky Ribbon Awards Silver Prize; 2004	Succeeded by Huge Tits G-Cup: Rapturous Valley
