= Mourning Wife =

2001 film by Daisuke Gotō

- Theatrical poster for Mourning Wife (2001)
- Directed by: Daisuke Gotō
- Written by: Daisuke Gotō; Kannin
- Produced by: Daisuke Gotō
- Starring: Mayuko Sasaki; Koharu Yamasaki
- Cinematography: Masahide Iioka
- Edited by: Shōji Sakai
- Music by: Kazumi Ōba
- Distributed by: Shintōhō Eiga
- Release date: September 28, 2001
- Running time: 60 minutes
- Country: Japan
- Language: Japanese

Mourning Wife (喪服の女 崩れる, Mofuku no onna: Kuzureru), a.k.a. An Affair with a Woman in Mourning, is a 2001 Japanese Pink film directed by Daisuke Gotō. It is a suspense-pink film in homage to The Postman Always Rings Twice (1946). It won the Silver Prize at the Pink Grand Prix ceremony. Personnel awards also went to Mayuko Sasaki for Best Actress, 2nd place and Masahide Iioka for Cinematography.

== Synopsis ==
Tomoko, the wife of an impotent and bitter man, hires a younger man to help her run her printing press business. She becomes involved in an affair with him.

== Cast ==
- Mayuko Sasaki: Tomiko Tachibana
- Koharu Yamasaki: Kyōko Yano
- Yukijirō Hotaru: Yutaka
- Kenichi Kanbe: Patient on crutches
- Shiori Kawamura: Nurse / Kaori
- Hiroyuki Kawasaki: Hiroyuki
- Keisaku Kimura: Ryūzō Sakata
- Yoshikata Matsuki: Mamoru Tachibana
- Kanae Mizuhara: Kanae
- Kumiko Mori: Kumiko
- Hōryū Nakamura: Akira
- Toshimasa Niiro: Akio

== Bibliography ==
=== English ===
- Mofuku no onna: Kuzureru (2001) at IMDb
- "Mourning Wife". pinkeiga.com. Archived from the original on April 22, 2009.

=== Japanese ===
- 喪服の女 崩れる (in Japanese). www.dmm.co.jp.
- 喪服の女 崩れる (in Japanese). Japanese Movie Database.
- 喪服の女 崩れる (in Japanese). P.G. Web Site.
- 喪服の女 崩れる (in Japanese). xcity.jp.
