= Shintōhō Eiga =

Japanese pink film company

Shintōhō Eiga 新東宝映画
- Founded: 1961
- Founder: Kōichi Gotō
- Headquarters: Tokyo, Japan
- Key people: Akira Mori, General Manager
- Products: Pink films
- Website: shin-toho.com

Shintōhō Eiga (新東宝映画; lit. Shintoho Pictures) is a Japanese pink film production company and film distributor located in Tokyo, Japan which has been among the most influential studios in the pink film genre since its beginnings.

== Foundation ==
The first Shintōhō, or "New Toho", also known as Shintōhō Co. Ltd. (新東宝株式会社, Shintōhō kabushiki kaisha), was formed as an offshoot of the Toho Company after World War II. When this company went bankrupt in May 1961, two new companies were created in its place. Shintōhō's former president, Mitsuru Ōkura, formed the Ōkura Eiga studio (later OP Eiga) after buying the Shintōhō production facilities in Setagaya, Tokyo while Kōichi Gotō, a Shintōhō employee at the company's Kansai sales office in Osaka, bought the rights to the name of the company. Three years later, in 1964, the 33-year-old Gotō used borrowed money to buy the management rights to the section in Osaka where he had previously worked. He named his new company Shintōhō Kōgyō (新東宝興業) or "Shintoho Entertainment". In 1972, this company moved to Tokyo and absorbed another piece of the former Shintōhō Company (Tokyo Kōei) to become Shintōhō Eiga (新東宝映画). After relocating to Tokyo, president Kōichi Gotō and his staff shared offices with Kokuei, the earliest pink film production company.

In this early period, the company mostly distributed films from other production studios, either those produced by the original Shintōhō or bought from other independent studios, but it also began to produce its own films. Among these early films was the sadomasochistic April 1968 Absolutely Secret: Girl Torture produced by Tokyo Kōei and featuring future pink film superstar Naomi Tani. Another early work was the September 1968 release Love Hotel directed by Shin'ya Yamamoto (director) and also produced by Tokyo Kōei.

A further group of early movies came from director Kiyoshi Komori who had been directing mainstream films for the original Shintōhō since 1953 but when that company dissolved, began directing pink films for Shintōhō Eiga. Komori made a number of films distributed by Shintōhō from 1964 until his retirement from pink film in the mid 1970s.

== The 1970s ==
After absorbing Tokyo Kōei and moving to Tokyo, Shintōhō began a period of rapid expansion. To compete with OP Eiga and its distribution network, Shintōhō began its own theater network, partnering with Kokuei, Nihon Cinema and Aoi Eiga. The years 1972-1976 constituted the peak years for Shintōhō when it produced some 60 films a year.

One of the directors working with Shintōhō during this period was Kōji Wakamatsu who made a number of S&M themed pink films for the studio including the 1975 Pornographic Casebook: Sexual Darkness and the 1976 Women Cruelty Dark Chronicles. Two other torture-filled works from Wakamatsu from this time are Torture Chronicles: 100 Years (1975) and its 1977 sequel Torture Chronicles Continues: 100 Years.

Toward the end of the decade, Shintōhō released the June 1979 Mamoru Watanabe Meiji period film Virgin Rope Makeover (少女縄化粧, Shōjo nawa geshō). The movie won the Best Film award at the Zoom-Up Film Festival (ズームアップ映画祭) while Watanabe took the Best Director award.

== The 1980s ==
The decade of the 1980s was a difficult one for the pink film industry generally, a combination of the advent of adult videos (AV) in 1981 and strict new government rules for theatrical films in 1984 caused a plunge in box office revenues. In order to compete with early AVs, which had taken a substantial portion of the adult entertainment market, Shintōhō transferred some of their films to video and began shooting new material directly on video. However, the pink film studios had trouble competing with the low budget videos produced by the new AV companies which also had the advantage of using real sex (though censored) in their productions.

Shintōhō also kept up its output of pink film as well. Especially popular was director Yōjirō Takita's Molester's Train (痴漢電車, Chikan densha) series featuring Detective Kuroda and his side-kick Hamako which began with the 1982 Molester's Train: Please Continue and ended eleven films later in 1985 with Molester's Train: 1 Centimeter From the Wall. The studio also released other entries in the series with different characters and by different directors, chiefly Minoru Inao (1983-1984) and Masahiro Kasai (1988-1991). One of Kasai's films Molester's Train: Shaking Booty (痴漢電車 お尻を振っておねだり, Chikan Densha: Oshiri O Futte Onedari) won the Best Film Third Place award and Kasai took one of Best New Director prizes at the first Pink Grand Prix in 1988.

As part of its Roman porno films, Nikkatsu started a Female Teacher series in 1977 based on sex and rape in the classroom. When Nikkatsu discontinued the series in 1983 due to complaints from teachers and the Japanese government, Shintōhō stepped in with the 1983 Female Teacher: Tight Bondage Discipline (女教師 緊縛化粧, Onna Kyōshi Kinbaku-gesho).

Another significant series for Shintōhō was the "Detective With Sunglasses" set of hardboiled action films directed by Yoshiho Fukuoka which featured actor Shirō Shimomoto as the ultra-hip Detective Eiji. The first film in the series was the 1983 Serial Rape: Attack! (連続暴行 犯す, Renzoku boko Okasu), followed by the 1985 Disgraced! Uniform Virgin (凌辱！制服処女, Ryojoku! Seifuku shojo) and the 1987 Almost Ripe Madonna: Tasty Big Thighs (半熟マドンナ おいしい太腿, Hanjuku Madonna Oishii Futomomo). According to the Weissers, the series declined in quality and popularity after the first entry.

== The 1990s ==
The 1990s saw a further decline in the pink film industry; Nikkatsu had released its last Roman porno film in 1988, and the company declared bankruptcy in 1993. However, the pink film was still being produced in large quantities and actually increased its share of total Japanese film production. In fact, Shintōhō president Kōichi Gotō was able to report that 1991-92 was the most profitable year in the company's history.

Of the new generation of directors from this period, often called (sometimes derisively) the "Four Heavenly Kings", one in particular, Hisayasu Satō, made a number of prominent films released by Shintōhō starting in the late 1980s. His 1990 film, named Poaching By The Water by the director, with its themes of forced sex and bestiality, caused a good deal of controversy and scandal. Shintōhō helped this along by renaming the film Horse and Woman and Dog and according to the company's website, it became one of their all-time hits. When Shintōhō decided to resurrect the Molester Train series originally started at the studio by director Yōjirō Takita in 1982, they chose Satō to direct the 1993 installment Molester's Train: Nasty Behavior. The film starred AV idol Yumika Hayashi and it was named the second best film at the Pink Grand Prix festival.

Shintōhō moved into video production again in 1992 with their "Hard Porno" line of S&M videos beginning with a series of films from the 1970s which had been sold to the studio by director Koji Wakamatsu.

The company celebrated its 30-year anniversary in 1993 with the release of Obscenities of Japan (ニッポンの猥褻, Nippon no waisetsu), a film described by general manager Akira Mori as "something akin to a pink-tinged version of a historical epic." The movie, directed by Minoru Inao and written by Takahisa Zeze, had double the budget of a standard pink film and featured actress Yumika Hayashi and actor Shinji Kubo.

In 1994, the studio released the Kokuei produced film Keep on Masturbating: Non-Stop Pleasure from director Toshiya Ueno which, in addition to winning Best Film of the year at the 1994 Pink Grand Prix, also brought awards to director Ueno, screenwriter Takahisa Zeze, and actors Takeshi Itō and Hotaru Hazuki. Jasper Sharp calls this "one of Ueno's most accomplished films" and posits the work as a lead-in to the next generation of Japanese pink film directors known as "The Seven Lucky Gods."

== The 2000s and beyond ==
At the beginning of the 21st century, only five pink film production companies were still operating in Japan. In addition to Shintōhō, the existing studios were Kokuei (which distributes its films through Shintōhō), OP Eiga, Xces, and ENK which produces gay-themed films. Despite the decline in studios, pink films were still a significant force in Japanese cinema, and of the 287 films released in Japan in 2003, 89 were pink films.

In 2004, the studio released Tsumugi which marked the pink film debut of AV Idol and actress Sora Aoi. The film won the fourth place Best Film Award at the 2004 Pink Grand Prix and Aoi took a Best New Actress award. The "Molester Train" series, begun in 1982, was re-invented once again in 2005 when Shintōhō produced Molester's Train: Suggestive Indecent Hips by director Naoyuki Tomomatsu. The film won the 3rd place Best Film award at that year's Pink Grand Prix.

== Personnel and output ==
=== Directors ===
Directors whose films were produced or released by Shintōhō Eiga include:

- Akira Fukuhara
- Daisuke Gotō
- Sachi Hamano
- Yutaka Ikejima
- Shinji Imaoka
- Shuji Kataoka
- Kiyoshi Komori
- Mitsuru Meike
- Hisayasu Sato
- Osamu Satō
- Toshiki Satō
- Masayuki Suo
- Banmei Takahashi
- Yōjirō Takita
- Naoyuki Tomomatsu
- Toshiya Ueno
- Shin'ya Yamamoto (director)
- Kōji Wakamatsu
- Mamoru Watanabe
- Takahisa Zeze

=== Actors and actresses ===
Notable actors and actresses who performed at Shintōhō Eiga include:

- Izumi Aki
- Sora Aoi
- Mayu Asada
- Lemon Hanazawa
- Kyōko Hashimoto
- Hotaru Hazuki
- Rinako Hirasawa
- Yukijiro Hotaru
- Yutaka Ikejima
- Kiyomi Ito
- Takeshi Ito
- Sakurako Kaoru
- Konatsu
- Emi Kuroda
- Kyōko Natsume
- Yūka Ōsawa
- Mayuko Sasaki
- Yōko Satomi
- Shirō Shimomoto
- Naomi Tani
- Yumi Yoshiyuki
- Akiho Yoshizawa

=== Films ===
Notable films produced or released by Shintōhō Eiga:

- Absolutely Secret: Girl Torture (Kiyoshi Komori, 1968)
- Love Hotel (Shin'ya Yamamoto, 1968)
- Raped with Eyes: Daydream (Toshiyuki Mizutani, 1982)
- S&M Hunter (Shūji Kataoka, 1986)
- Sexy Battle Girls (Mototsugu Watanabe, 1986)
- Lesbian Harem (Tomoaki Hosoyama, 1987)
- Horse and Woman and Dog (Hisayasu Satō, 1990)
- Real Underwear Body (Yutaka Ikejima, 1994)
- Molester's Train Housewife: Madam is a Pervert (Toshiki Satō, 1994)
- Pink Salon Hospital 3: No-Pants Exam Room (Mototsugu Watanabe, 2000)
- Mourning Wife (Daisuke Gotō, 2001)
- Office Lady's Sexual Confession: Burning Love Affair (Yutaka Ikejima, 2002)
- Obscene Stalker: It Holds in Darkness! (Yutaka Ikejima, 2002)
- A Lonely Cow Weeps at Dawn (Daisuke Gotō, 2003)
- The Glamorous Life of Sachiko Hanai (Mitsuru Meike, 2003)
- Tsumugi (Hidekazu Takahara, 2004)
- Hard Lesbian: Quick and Deep (Osamu Satō, 2005)
- Frog Song (Shinji Imaoka, 2005)
- Blind Love (Daisuke Gotō, 2005)
- Chikan Densha: Suggestive Indecent Hips (Naoyuki Tomomatsu, 2005)
- Three Naked Sisters: Lewdness (Yasufumi Tanaka, 2006)
- Mature Woman: Wife-Hunting (Yutaka Ikejima, 2006)
- Aching Wives: Continuous Adultery (Akira Fukuhara, 2006)
- New Tokyo Decadence – The Slave (Osamu Satō, 2007)
- Temptation: Eating Me (Osamu Satō, 2007)
- Continuous Adultery 2: A Portrait of Incest between Sisters (Akira Fukuhara, 2008)

== Bibliography ==
=== English ===
- Sharp, Jasper (2008). Behind the Pink Curtain: The Complete History of Japanese Sex Cinema. Guildford: FAB Press. ISBN 978-1-903254-54-7.
- Weisser, Thomas; Yuko Mihara Weisser (1998). Japanese Cinema Encyclopedia: The Sex Films. Miami: Vital Books : Asian Cult Cinema Publications. ISBN 1-88928-852-7.

=== Japanese ===
- "Japanese Cinema Database". Agency for Cultural Affairs.
- "Japanese Movie Database" (in Japanese). Japanese Movie Database.
