= Minoru Kunizawa =

Japanese film director, screenwriter and actor (born 1964)

- Born: 1964 (age 61–62); Hyōgo Prefecture, Japan
- Occupations: Film director Screenwriter; Actor
- Years active: 1995 –

Minoru Kunizawa (国沢実 or 国沢☆実 or 国沢星実 or 国沢卍実, Kunizawa Minoru) a.k.a. Shūsaku Niki (仁木周作, Niki Shūsaku) is a Japanese film director, screenwriter, and actor best known for his work in the pink film genre. Including Yutaka Ikejima, Yumi Yoshiyuki and Tarō Araki, Kunizawa is one of the four top directors of Ōkura Productions (OP) at the turn of the millennium, and the only one of the four who did not start out as an actor. Instead, Kunizawa joined the film industry as an assistant director to pink film pioneer Satoru Kobayashi. He made his directorial debut with Kyonyū: hasande kuwaeru (巨乳 はさんで咥える) (1995). Kunizawa's films have been very popular with pink film fans, and he has had more than one film in the Top Ten at the Pink Grand Prix for multiple years. He has also won the Best Director prize twice. Irresistable Angel: Suck It All Up (2003), for which he won Best Director, is an erotic variation on the X-Men story.

== Top-ten films, Pink Grand Prix ==
- 1999 7th place (tie): Peeking at Mother-in-Law: On Tiptoe with Tongue's Entwined (義母覗き 爪先に舌絡ませて, Gibo Nozoki: Tsumasaki ni Shita Karamasete)
- 1999 7th place (tie): No-Underwear Housewife: Wildly Immoral Weekend (ノーパン妻 週末は不倫狂い, Nōpan tsuma: Shūmatsu wa Furin Kurui)
- 2000 3rd place: The Bride is Wet on the Wedding Night
- 2000 5th place (tie): Adulterous Desires: I Want to be Satisfied (不倫願望 癒されたい, Furinkanbō: Iyasaretai)
- 2001 8th place: Private Lessons: Home Teacher's Breast
- 2003 4th place: Irresistable Angel: Suck It All Up
- 2003 7th place: Eighteen Year-Old, Uniform's Breast (十八歳、制服の胸元, Jūhassai, Seifuku no Munamoto)
- 2005 7th place: Lustful Wife in Black: Aching (欲情喪服妻 うずく, Yokujōmō Fukutsuma: Uzuku)

== Bibliography ==
=== English ===
- Minoru Kunizawa at IMDb
- Sharp, Jasper (2008). Behind the Pink Curtain: The Complete History of Japanese Sex Cinema. Guildford: FAB Press. pp. 334, 350. ISBN 978-1-903254-54-7.

=== Japanese ===
- 国沢☆実 くにざわ・みのる (in Japanese). Allcinema.net.
- 国沢実 (in Japanese). Japanese Movie Database.
- 国沢実 (in Japanese). Pin-pon.hp.infoseek.co.jp].

Awards and achievements
Pink Grand Prix
Preceded by Yūji Tajiri for Office Lady Love Juice	Pink Grand Prix for Best Director; Minoru Kunizawa; 2000 for The Bride is Wet on the Wedding Night	Succeeded by Tarō Araki for Sister-in-Law's Wet Thighs
Preceded by Mitsuru Meike for Shameless Family	Pink Grand Prix for Best Director; Minoru Kunizawa; 2003 for Irresistable Angel: Suck It All Up	Succeeded by Shinji Imaoka for Lunch Box
