= Hard Lesbian: Quick and Deep =

- Theatrical poster
- Directed by: Osamu Satō
- Written by: Yūta Takahashi
- Starring: Kyōko Natsume
- Cinematography: Issaku Maei
- Edited by: Shōji Sakai
- Music by: Kazumi Ōba
- Distributed by: Shintōhō Eiga
- Release date: February 25, 2005
- Running time: 63 minutes
- Country: Japan
- Language: Japanese

Hard Lesbian: Quick and Deep (ハードレズビアン クイック&ディープ) (aka Coming Out and Shell Joining, Pervert Woman and Office Lady (貝あわせ、痴女とＯＬ, Kai-Awase, Chijo to OL)) is a 2005 Japanese pink film directed by Osamu Satō. It won the awards for Best Film, Eighth Place and Best New Actress at the Pink Grand Prix ceremony.

== Synopsis ==
Reiko is an office lady who feels alienated by the male-centric corporate society, sexual abuse from males during her daily commute, and her disappointing romantic life with her co-worker and fiancée, Aki. She meets a woman on a commuter train who introduces her to lesbian society, and she engages in a relationship with a woman she meets at a bar.

== Reception ==
Jasper Sharp writes that Hard Lesbian: Quick and Deep's portrayal of lesbianism is "surprisingly earnest and sensitively-handled". The Weissers write that lesbian-themed pink films have usually been made for heterosexual male audiences interested in seeing "two naked female bodies for the price of one", rather than for the gay and lesbian community.

Shintōhō Eiga submitted the film to the Tokyo International Lesbian & Gay Film Festival, but despite its sincere depiction of lesbian relationships, its sex scenes were said to have been obviously intended for a heterosexual audience. According to Sharp, organizers of the festival regard most of these films — with some notable exceptions by directors Yutaka Ikejima and Yumi Yoshiyuki — as exploitation films.

=== Accolades ===
The mainstream pink film community named Hard Lesbian: Quick and Deep the Eighth Best Film of the year at the Pink Grand Prix. Lead actress Kyōko Natsume was given the Best New Actress award at the ceremony.

Preceded by Widow * Second Wife: Real Sucking Engulfing a Rare Utensil	Pink Grand Prix Eighth Best Film; 2005	Succeeded by Mighty Extreme Woman aka Uncle's Paradise
