= Nakagawa Jun Kyōju no Inbina Hibi =

- Theatrical poster for Nakagawa Jun Kyōju no Inbina Hibi (2008)
- Directed by: Kunihiko Matsuoka
- Written by: Mamoru Imanishi
- Starring: Rinako Hirasawa; Minami Aoyama
- Cinematography: Naoto Muranishi
- Edited by: Masatsugu Sakai
- Music by: Ichirō Ebisu
- Distributed by: Matsuoka Productions; Xces
- Release date: March 28, 2008
- Country: Japan
- Language: Japanese

Nakagawa Jun Kyōju no Inbina Hibi (中川准教授の淫びな日々, Nakagawa Jun Kyōju no Inbina Hibi) (lit. The lewd days of Associate Professor Nakagawa) is a 2008 Japanese pink film directed by Kunihiko Matsuoka and starring Rinako Hirasawa and Minami Aoyama. It won the Silver Prize at the Pink Grand Prix ceremony and Takashi Naha won Best Actor, 2nd place for his performance in the film.

== Cast ==
- Rinako Hirasawa: Nana Mochizuki
- Minami Aoyama: Emi Nakagawa
- Azusa Sakai: Yōko Nakagawa
- Keisuke Iba: Tanehiko Yoda
- Seshio (世志男): Keizō Akao
- Takashi Naha: Shirō Nakagawa

== Bibliography ==
- Nakagawa Jun kyôju no inbi na hibi at IMDb
- 中川准教授の淫びな日々 (in Japanese). P*G Web Site. Archived from the original on 2012-03-14.
- 中川准教授の淫びな日々 (in Japanese). Shin Nihon Eizo.

Preceded by Adultery Addiction: Sensual Daze	Pink Grand Prix Silver Prize; 2008	Succeeded by To Be Announced
