= Tsumugi =

Tsumugi may refer to:

- Tsumugi (film), a 2004 Japanese film
- Tsumugi (cloth), a traditional Japanese cloth made from slub silk

== People ==
- Risa Tsumugi (born 1996), Japanese voice actress
- Taku Tsumugi (born 1964), Japanese manga artist

== Fictional characters ==
with the given name Tsumugi

- Tsumugi Aoba, a fictional character from the Ensemble Stars! series
- Tsumugi Inuzuka, a fictional character in the Japanese manga series Sweetness and Lightning
- Tsumugi Kotobuki, a fictional character in the Japanese manga series K-On!
- Tsumugi Nakata, a fictional character in the Japanese anime series Soaring Sky! Pretty Cure
- Tsumugi Shirogane, a fictional character from the Danganronpa series
- Tsumugi Wenders, a fictional character from the Summer Pockets series

with the surname Tsumugi

- Rintaro Tsumugi (紬 凛太郎), a fictional character in the manga series The Fragrant Flower Blooms with Dignity
