= Love Hotel =

Love Hotel may refer to:

- Love hotel, a short-stay hotel operated primarily for sexual activities
- The Love Hotel, a 1933 German film directed by Carl Lamac
- Love Hotel (1968 film), a Japanese pink film directed by Shin'ya Yamamoto
- Love Hotel (1985 film), a Japanese Roman porno film directed by Shinji Sōmai
