= Yōichirō Morikawa =

Japanese actor and director

- Born: August 14, 1979 (age 46); Fukui, Fukui, Japan
- Occupations: Independent film director, screenwriter and actor

Yōichirō Morikawa (森川 陽一郎, Morikawa Yōichirō; born 14 August 1979, Fukui, Fukui) is a Japanese Independent film director, screenwriter, actor and calligrapher. He gained media attention when he was arrested and charged on suspicion of paying a 17-year-old girl for sexual services in March 2006.

== Works ==
- Endress On The Road - 青春には果てない (Seishun Niwa Hatenai) (2003)
- Firstlove On The Little Beach - 小さな青春の浜 (Chiisana Seishun No Hama) (2004)
- For Every Fukui Revolution - 福井青春物語 (Fukui Seishun Monogatari) (2005)

== See also ==
- Prostitution of children
- Enjo kōsai
- List of Japanese film directors
- List of Japanese actors
