= Lunch Box (film) =

- Poster for Lunch Box (2004) under its original theatrical release as Mature Woman: Rutting Ball-Play
- Directed by: Shinji Imaoka
- Written by: Shinji Imaoka
- Produced by: Daisuke Asakura
- Starring: Yumika Hayashi
- Edited by: Kazuhiro Suzuki
- Production company: Kokuei
- Distributed by: Shintōhō Eiga
- Release date: March 9, 2004
- Running time: 65 min.
- Country: Japan
- Language: Japanese

Lunch Box (熟女・発情 タマしゃぶり, Jukujo: hatsujō tamashaburi; lit. Mature Woman: Rutting Ball-Play) aka Bowling Ball (たまもの, Tamamono) is a 2004 Japanese pink film directed by Shinji Imaoka. It was chosen as Best Film of the year at the Pink Grand Prix ceremony.

== Synopsis ==
The film tells the story of Aiko, a 35-year-old mute woman who works in a bowling alley, and her brief romance with Yoshioka, a younger man who works as a postal carrier. The two meet when Aiko accidentally knocks Yoshioka off his bicycle, and they have a sexual encounter soon after. Aiko begins preparing lunchboxes and giving them to Yoshioka at his workplace as a way of expressing affection, which she cannot do verbally. The film ends in tragedy after Yoshioka leaves Aiko.

== Cast ==
- Yumika Hayashi as Aiko Fukui
- Mutsuo Yoshioka as Yoshio Kawada
- Lemon Hanazawa as Ikumi Kato
- Kiyomi Itō as Keiko Chiba
- Takeshi Itō as Ishimoto
- Yōta Kawase as Arima
- Kazunori Sakurai as Matsuo
- Hiroshi Satō as Bowling king

== Critical reception ==
The pink film community awarded Lunchbox top honors at the 2004 Pink Grand Prix. Besides the "Best Film" prize, Shinji Imaoka was given the "Best Director" title, and Yumika Hayashi was judged "Best Actress", and Lemon Hanazawa "Best New Actress" for their work in the film.

Anglophone pink film scholar Jasper Sharp notes that Lunchbox differs from the standard pink film in several technical aspects: the sex scenes are not simulated, the sound recording is live, not post-synced, and Imaoka chose to shoot on 16mm rather than 35mm film. Other than these points, Sharp judges the film typical of director Imaoka's work, which is known for its understatement in portraying relationships among characters on the outskirts of society. Of Lunchbox, he writes, "The intensity of the love scenes and the tenderness of the performances make this work especially one of considerable potency."

== Availability ==
Lunch Box released as Tamamono / Bowling Ball on DVD

Typical of modern pink films, the film has been given various titles in various releases. Originally release theatrically as Lunchbox ("Obento") or Mature Woman: Rutting Ball-Play, on 2 April 2005 the film was released in Japan on DVD under the title Tamamono or "Bowling Ball". The film was also released on DVD in the UK by Salvation. The film has also been seen in international film festivals such as the fourth "Nippon Connection" in Frankfurt in 2004, and the Jeonju International Film Festival in South Korea.

| Preceded by Ambiguous | Pink Grand Prix for Best Film; 2004 | Succeeded by Frog Song |
