= Raped with Eyes: Daydream =

- Theatrical poster for Raped with Eyes: Daydream (1982)
- Directed by: Toshiyuki Mizutani
- Written by: Toshiyuki Mizutani
- Starring: Kazuhiro Yamaji; Shinobu Nami; Makoto Yoshino
- Cinematography: Yūichi Nagata
- Music by: Hiroki Sakaguchi
- Production company: Takahashi Productions
- Distributed by: Shintōhō Eiga
- Release date: September 1982
- Running time: 60 minutes
- Country: Japan
- Language: Japanese

Raped with Eyes: Daydream (視姦白日夢, Shikan Hakujitsumu) is a 1982 Japanese pink film directed by Toshiyuki Mizutani.

== Synopsis ==
Kazu is a man who indulges in daydream fantasies of sexual dalliances with women. As his fantasies become increasingly violent and even homicidal, neither he nor the film's audience is sure whether these are really harmless, if perverse, fantasies or if they are really happening.

== Cast ==
- Kazuhiro Yamaji (山路和宏) as Kazu
- Shinobu Nami (奈美しのぶ)
- Makoto Yoshino (美野真琴)
- Mika Hijiri (聖ミカ)
- Seiko Munakata (宗方征子)

== Background ==
Director Toshiyuki Mizutani's first film as was Lust Hunting: Office Lady Rape (also 1982), which Thomas and Yuko Mihara Weisser label a "wicked debut". For his interest in cinematic violence critics dubbed him "The Pink Demon". Raped with Eyes: Daydream is Mizutani's best-known work. With this film, Mizutani added the elements of surrealism and fantasy which enabled him to distance himself and the audience from the on-screen mayhem and to add a further level of meaning to the scenario. The Weissers write, "The psychotic perspective of the film compensates for the offensive message."

== Availability ==
Toshiyuki Mizutani filmed Raped with Eyes: Daydream for director Banmei Takahashi's Takahashi Productions, and it was released theatrically in Japan by Shintōhō Eiga in September 1982. On May 21, 1999, under the title Bright Daydream (視感白日夢, Mikan Hakujitsumu), Arena Entertainment released Raped with Eyes: Daydream on DVD as the second in their Japanese Pink Film Classics Series (日本ピンク映画厳選名作シリーズ).

== Bibliography ==
=== English ===
- "SHIKAN HAKUJITSUMU". Complete Index to World Film.
- Shikan hakujitsumu (1982) at IMDb
- Weisser, Thomas; Yuko Mihara Weisser (1998). Japanese Cinema Encyclopedia: The Sex Films. Miami: Vital Books : Asian Cult Cinema Publications. pp. 328, 341. ISBN 1-889288-52-7.

=== Japanese ===
- 視姦白日夢 (in Japanese). Japanese Cinema Database (Agency for Cultural Affairs).
- 視姦白日夢 (in Japanese). Japanese Movie Database.
