= Mayu Asada =

Japanese actress

- Born: June 26, 1975 (age 51); Shizuoka, Japan
- Height: 1.58 m (5 ft 2 in)

Mayu Asada (麻田真夕, Asada Mayu) is a Japanese actress best known for her appearances in pink films. She has appeared in award-winning pink films, and was given a "Best Actress" award for her work in this genre of theatrical softcore pornography in 2004.

== Life and career ==
Mayu Asada was born on June 26, 1975, in Shizuoka, Japan. She was not originally a fan of the softcore pink film genre, considering them to be "dark and terrifying". After a friend introduced her to these theatrically released films, she lost her apprehension of them. She later told reporters that she hoped for women to become a part of the pink films audience. "I know men are seeing them because of their sexual interest," she said, "but even women must not dislike them."

Toshirō Enomoto's Groper Train (2001, released theatrically in Japan as Molester Train: Touch and Surprise, and on video as Summer of Listening Carefully) was chosen as the Best Film, 3rd place at the Pink Grand Prix. It represented the pink film genre to South Korea at that country's Pink Film Festival Korea in 2007. Reversing the usual format of the "Groper Train" series, Asada plays the role of a female groper and pickpocket who intrudes on the life of her male victim. In his Behind the Pink Curtain: The Complete History of Japanese Sex Cinema, Jasper Sharp writes that Asada gives the "lightweight, though intricately plotted, romantic-comedy scenario" a "sparky performance". For her work in the film, Asada was awarded Best New Actress, third place at the Pink Grand Prix.

After having appeared in seven pink films, Asada reported that she had pride in her work. "Many theater audiences give me various impressions. They see movies as important productions, and I feel I am doing something worthwhile." She appeared in episodes 9 and 12 of the NHK network evening drama もっと恋セヨ乙女 SEARCHING FOR HER HAPPINESS (2002–04). She later performed the voice of the character Natsumi Iriya, leader of the Sabel Tigers team in the 2006 TV Tokyo / TV Aichi anime series Air Gear.

In 2004 Asada starred in director Tarō Araki's Housekeeper with Beautiful Skin: Made Wet with Finger Torture, which won the Best Film, Silver Prize award at the Pink Grand Prix. Writer-director-actress Yumi Yoshiyuki was also given the award for Best Screenplay for the film. At the first of the Kansai region Pinky Ribbon Awards, the film won the Gold Prize, and Asada was named Best Actress at the ceremony.

Awards and achievements
Pinky Ribbon Awards
Preceded by New award	Pinky Ribbon Award for Best Actress; Mayu Asada; 2004	Succeeded by Yumika Hayashi
