= Nichiyobi wa Owaranai =

2000 film

- Film poster
- Directed by: Yōichirō Takahashi
- Written by: Ryo Iwamatsu
- Starring: Yumika Hayashi
- Release date: 22 October 2000 (Japan)
- Running time: 89 minutes
- Country: Japan
- Language: Japanese

Nichiyobi wa Owaranai (Japanese: 日曜日は終わらない), also known as Sunday's Dream, is a Japanese drama film directed by Yōichirō Takahashi. Originally broadcast in 1999 as an NHK Hi-Vision drama, it was screened in the Un Certain Regard section at the 2000 Cannes Film Festival. It was screened theatrically in October 2005 after the sudden death of lead actress, Yumika Hayashi, in June of that year.

== Cast ==
- Yumika Hayashi
- Liliy
- Kenji Mizuhashi
- Shinya Tsukamoto
- Tetsu Watanabe
- Yumi Yoshiyuki
