= Horse and Woman and Dog =

1990 Japanese pink film

- Theatrical poster
- Directed by: Hisayasu Satō
- Written by: Shirō Yumeno
- Starring: Kanako Kishi
- Cinematography: Masashi Inayoshi
- Edited by: Shōji Sakai
- Music by: Sō Hayakawa
- Distributed by: Media Top; Shintōhō Eiga
- Release date: May 1990
- Running time: 58 min.
- Country: Japan
- Language: Japanese

Horse and Woman and Dog (馬と女と犬, Uma to Onna to Inu) aka Horse and Dog and Lady (馬と犬と貴婦人, Uma to Inu to Kifujin) and Poaching by the Water or Poaching by the Water's Edge (密猟の汀, Mitsuryō no Migiwa) is a 1990 Japanese pink film directed by Hisayasu Satō.

== Synopsis ==
Three social outcasts who live near the seaside interact with each other in increasingly disturbing ways. The trio of characters are a woman who has killed her sister, a man who enjoys necrophilia, and a female amnesiac. The first woman engages in sadistic pursuits such as capturing young women at the beach to force them to engage in sexual activities, including copulation with a horse and a dog.

== Cast ==
- Kanako Kishi (岸加奈子) as Yūko Hayakawa
- Yuri Sasaki (佐々木ゆり) as Maki Yano
- Emi Uehara (上原絵美) as Norie Kiyama
- Tatsuya Takahashi (高橋達也) as Akihisa Tsuda
- Takahiko Kobayashi (小林節彦) as Shin Kijima
- Kazuhiro Sano as Akira Migita

== Production ==
Usually concerned with the alienation of modern urban life, Horse and Woman and Dog was the first of director Satō's films to have a non-urban setting, though his dark and disturbing style remained. Satō originally named the film Poaching By The Water, but Shintōhō Eiga, the distributing company, chose to promote the scenes of bestiality in advertising, and gave it the more specific title Horse and Woman and Dog. Such renaming by studios is common in the pink film industry. Kanako Kishi's sex scenes with animals created a good deal of controversy and resultant publicity. Shintōhō Eiga's strategy paid off, and the film became a scandalous success, and, according to the studio's website, one of the top hits in Shintōhō's history.

In his Behind the Pink Curtain: The Complete History of Japanese Sex Cinema, Jasper Sharp singles out the opening scene of Horse and Woman and Dog as an example of Satō's technique for placing the audience at an uncomfortable position as viewers of his films. The sadistic woman is applying make-up to her face while looking into the mirror of a compact. As the sounds of a young girl's screams become more audible, the woman tilts the mirror so that her face is looking directly into the audience. Sunglasses prevent the audience from fully understanding how it is to interpret the woman's gaze. In their Japanese Cinema Encyclopedia: The Sex Films, the Weissers give Horse Woman and Dog a qualified—due to the extreme nature of the film—rating of three out of four stars. The success of Horse and Woman and Dog led Satō to film a second bestiality-themed film the following year, Lady of the Stable (aka WAVE, 1991).

== Release ==
Horse and Woman and Dog was released theatrically in May 1990. It was released to home video in the VHS format in 1999. On November 11, 2003, it was re-released under the title Horse and Dog and Lady. On July 14, 2008, Shintōhō Eiga made the film available through their online AV on Demand service at XCity.

== Bibliography ==
=== English ===
- Sharp, Jasper (2008). Behind the Pink Curtain: The Complete History of Japanese Sex Cinema. Guildford: FAB Press. pp. 174, 264, 266, 357. ISBN 978-1-903254-54-7.
- Weisser, Thomas; Yuko Mihara Weisser (1998). "HISAYASU SATO: HORSE * WOMAN * DOG (1990)". Japanese Cinema Encyclopedia: The Sex Films. Miami: Vital Books : Asian Cult Cinema Publications. ISBN 1-889288-52-7.
- Uma to onna to inu (1990) at IMDb

=== Japanese ===
- 馬と女と犬 (in Japanese). Japanese Movie Database.
- "馬と女と犬". Japanese Cinema Database (Agency for Cultural Affairs). Archived from the original on 2012-03-26.
- 馬と犬と貴婦人 (in Japanese). www.nakamuraeigeki.com.
- 馬と女と犬 (in Japanese). Xcity.
