= Uncle's Paradise =

- Poster for Uncle's Paradise in its original theatrical release as Mighty Extreme Woman (2006)
- Directed by: Shinji Imaoka
- Starring: Shirō Shimomoto; Minami Aoyama
- Distributed by: Shintōhō Eiga
- Release date: May 12, 2006
- Running time: 64 min.
- Country: Japan
- Language: Japanese

Uncle's Paradise (おじさん天国, Ojisan tengoku) aka Mighty Extreme Woman (絶倫絶女, Zetsurin zetsujo) is a 2006 Japanese pink film directed by Shinji Imaoka.

== Synopsis ==
This erotic comedy follows the life of Haruo Maekawa, a young man who makes a living catching squid. Haruo is obsessed with catching a legendary giant squid rumored to live in Tokyo Bay. Haruo's uncle Takashi, fallen on hard times, comes to stay with his nephew until he can get back on his feet. Uncle Takashi is addicted to energy drinks, and seduces any woman in sight, including Haruo's girlfriend Rika. After making a sexual conquest, Uncle Takashi "marks his territory" by writing his name in red on the back of the woman. He takes a job as a pizza delivery man, but this job ends when he gets in an accident. While praying at a Shintō shrine, Uncle Takashi is bitten in the scrotum by a poisonous snake and dies. The uncle is destined to spend the afterlife in Hell unless his nephew and girlfriend can rescue him from the King of Hell.

== Critical reception ==
In The Japan Times, Mark Schilling writes that the film is, "a surrealistic comedy about the erotic trials and triumphs of a pep-tonic addicted middle-age man and his squid-fishing nephew, climaxing in a descent to love-hotel hell, with Satan as the desk clerk." Jasper Sharp, in Behind the Pink Curtain: The Complete History of Japanese Sex Cinema, calls the Uncle's Paradise one of director Imaoka's least satisfactory and least typical works. He writes, however, that the film works well "in a structureless, no-holds-barred nonsense sort of way, chockfull of some admittedly very funny belly laughs."

The pink film community awarded lead actress Minami Aoyama with the Best Actress prize at the Pink Grand Prix ceremony. Pink film veteran Shiro Shimomoto was given the Best Actor award for his role as Uncle Takashi. Mutsuo Yoshioka won Best Actor second place for his role as the nephew. The film was picked as the eighth best pink release of 2006. At the Pinky Ribbon Awards, Uncle's Paradise was given the Silver Prize.

== Bibliography ==
- Sharp, Jasper (2008). Behind the Pink Curtain: The Complete History of Japanese Sex Cinema. Guildford: FAB Press. pp. 173, 329–331, 345. ISBN 978-1-903254-54-7.
- Ojisan tengoku (2006) at IMDb
- "Uncle's Paradise". pinkeiga.com. Archived from the original on April 29, 2009.

| Preceded by Hard Lesbian: Quick and Deep | Pink Grand Prix Eighth Best Film; 2006 | Succeeded by Fascinating Woman: The Temptation of Creampie |
| Preceded by Huge Tits G-Cup: Rapturous Valley | Pinky Ribbon Awards Silver Prize; 2006 | Succeeded by Adultery Addiction: Sensual Daze |
