= Yumika Hayashi =

Japanese former adult film actress

- 林由美香
- Born: Yumika Oguri; June 27, 1970; Tokyo, Japan
- Died: June 28, 2005 (aged 35)
- Height: 1.58 m (5 ft 2 in)

Yumika Hayashi (Japanese: 林由美香, Hepburn: Hayashi Yumika; June 27, 1970 – June 28, 2005) was a Japanese AV idol and pink film actress. She earned the title of "Japan's Original Adult Video Queen" during a 16-year career in which she starred in nearly 200 AVs and appeared in over 180 films. Hayashi was also a prominent pink film actress; she was the subject of a 1997 documentary and the recipient of the Best Actress award at the Pink Grand Prix ceremony in 2004 as well as receiving the Special Career Award the following year. Her death on June 28, 2005, one day after her 35th birthday, ended one of the longest careers in the AV field and made front-page news in Tokyo. Following her death, Hayashi was awarded a second Special Career Award at the 2006 Pink Grand Prix ceremony and became the subject of several theatrical retrospectives and a 382-page biography.

== Life and career ==
Yumika Hayashi was born Yumika Oguri (小栗 由美香, Oguri Yumika) in Tokyo on June 27, 1970. Her parents divorced when she was in 5th grade, elementary school, and Hayashi was on her own by the time she was in high school. Hayashi's mother managed a popular ramen chain.

Hayashi made her adult video debut in the bishōjo genre with the June 1989 h.m.p. Miss Christine release, Shigamitsuku 18-sai: ojōsama wa shitanai (しがみつく18歳 お嬢様はしたない). She made her pink film debut the same year, and her starring debut with the Xces studio release, Double Rape to Break in a Perverted Wild Filly (ダブルレイプ 変態調教) in October 1990. She became one of the most popular AV Actresses of the 1990s. Several of her early videos were for the V&R Planning studio under the direction of Company Matsuo who was also her lover.

Cult director Hisayasu Satō chose Hayashi for a major role in his 1993 film Real Action: Drink Up!, and continued an association with the actress in several films. In his entry in the Molester's Train series, Molester's Train: Dirty Behavior a.k.a. Birthday Hayashi had a role in a film whose "austere tone" was in direct contrast to the light, comic tone of the previous films in the series, started by Academy Award-winner Yōjirō Takita in 1982. In the role of the "gluttonous woman" who eats herself in Satō's Naked Blood (1996) Hayashi performed what Allmovie calls "one of the most appalling scenes in Japanese horror", in which her character cooks, then consumes various parts of her body. In 1995, Hayashi played a role in a TBS television series featuring Taro Miyako Nishimura's fictional detective, Inspector Totsukawa, The Izu Coast Road Murder (伊豆海岸殺人ルート, Izu Kaigan Satsujin Ruuto).

By mid-1996, another V&R Planning director, Katsuyuki Hirano (who was married) had replaced Company Matsuo as Hayashi's lover and the two of them traveled to the north of Japan in July 1996 on a bike trip. Hirano produced an AV version of their trip titled Tokyo - Rebun 41-day Adultery Bicycle Touring Trip and later in 1997 edited a mainstream documentary on the trip entitled Yumika. Hayashi received credit for the shooting of the film, and Hirano was Hayashi's co-star. In 1998, she was again working in television in the NHK TV drama Blue Fireworks (青い花火 or Aoi Hanabi) broadcast on November 28, 1998. Hayashi also appeared in director Yōichirō Takahashi's drama Nichiyōbi wa Owaranai (日曜日は終わらない) which originally aired on NHK TV as a High-Definition satellite TV broadcast on October 21, 1999. It was subsequently shown as Sunday's Dream (1999) at the 53rd Cannes Film Festival, and won the FIPRESCI Prize at the Chicago International Film Festival. In their review of the film, midnighteye.com commented, "The big surprise is that former porn star Yumika Hayashi is also very good as the happy-go-lucky Sachiko".

As one of the top erotic actresses of her day, Hayashi was invited to the Cinequint theater in Shibuya to speak at a woman's-only night showing of pink films in March 2002. Similar events had attracted a large audience of young women. On the subject of women viewing her films, Hayashi told the weekly Shūkan Bunshun, "To be honest, I've never really thought about whether my movies were being watched by men or women. We always presume that only guys are going to turn them on... Still, this'll be a great chance for girls to get to know about the porno movie industry. I think the most enjoyable part of the night is going to be the questions asked after the films are over. I wonder what the girls are going to ask me?"

At the 17th Pink Grand Prix awards, for the year of 2004, Hayashi won the "Best Actress" award for her performance in Lunch Box a.k.a. Mature Woman: Rutting Ball-Play (熟女・発情 タマしゃぶり, Jukujō: hatsujō tamashaburi). Hayashi's prolific career earned her a reputation as an "iron woman" of Japanese erotic cinema, and after her death, the weekly Shūkan Taishū wrote that Hayashi's 180 filmed appearances deserved mention in the Guinness World Records. At the Pink Grand Prix for 2005 she was given a special Career Award for Achievement as an Actress.

== Death ==
When director Katsuyuki Hirano became concerned that Hayashi had not reported for work for a couple of days, he, another AV worker and Hayashi's mother went to her apartment on the morning of June 29, 2005, two days after Hayashi's 35th birthday. There they discovered her dead body in bed. A friend of Hayashi's described the scene to reporters, "Yumika was lying in her bed and the three people who found her thought she was sleeping. When they realized she wasn't breathing, they quickly called for an ambulance, but it was already too late, Yumika's mom was shattered, screaming, crying and going half crazy."

At the time of her death, suicide and murder were both considered possible causes of death. Hayashi's romantic life was seen as a possible cause of foul play. A colleague in the AV industry reported that Hayashi had broken off a relationship with a younger man about three months before her death. "They'd lived together for a while. She seemed to have been pretty shocked when the relationship came to an end."

A neighbor agreed telling reporters, "About three months ago, she had a huge fight with a guy that forced the cops to be called to our apartment block. A pile of men's photos and underpants came flying out of the window of her eighth floor apartment and landed on passers-by."

Hayashi's friend and director Yumi Yoshiyuki disagreed with the possibility of suicide, telling Friday weekly, "She was a really bright kid. She'd told me that she'd just found a new boyfriend and was really happy. I cannot believe she could possibly have committed suicide."

It was later determined that no intentional causes were involved in the actress' death. Instead Hayashi's death was the result of a night of heavy drinking while celebrating her 35th birthday. After the party, Hayashi had choked to death in her bed after vomiting in her sleep.

== Legacy ==
Hayashi was remembered as part of a TV Asahi special on those who had recently died. The show, Sayonara 5, 6 tsuki hen (さよなら 5、6月編), was broadcast on August 12, 2005 and included reminiscences and some details of the day before her death.

Hayashi's last film, Miss Peach: Peachy Sweetness Huge Breasts (ミスピーチ 巨乳は桃の甘み, Misu Piichi: kyonyū wa momo no umami) (2005), directed by Yumi Yoshiyuki, was released in September 2005. Yoshiyuki and co-star Sakurako Kaoru participated in the memorial ceremony for Hayashi at the film's opening at the Ueno Okura theater. The film received a standing ovation. Hayashi's posthumous work was chosen as the fifth best pink release of the year 2005 at the Pink Grand Prix. The 2006 Pink Grand Prix posthumously gave Hayashi her second special award for her work as a pink film actress. Yoshiyuki Hayashida, founder of the pink film magazine P*G and the Pink Grand Prix co-authored a 382-page biography of Hayashi in 2006 entitled YUMIKA HAYASHI : A Portrait of the Actress as a Young Woman (女優 林由美香, Joyū Hayashi Yumika). In 2009, Japanese-Korean director Tetsuaki Matsue filmed a documentary on Hayashi. Titled Annyeong Yumika (あんにょん由美香, Annyon Yumika), the film includes appearances by Hayashi's former colleagues actress Lemon Hanazawa and directors Company Matsuo and Katsuyuki Hirano.

Awards and achievements
Pink Grand Prix
Preceded by Motoko Sasaki for Adulterous Wife's Dirty Afternoon	Pink Grand Prix for Best Actress; Yumika Hayashi; 2004 for Lunch Box	Succeeded by Konatsu for Paid Companionship Story: Girls Who Want to Do It
Pinky Ribbon Awards
Preceded by New Award	Pinky Ribbon Award for Best Supporting Actress; Yumika Hayashi; 2004	Succeeded by Lemon Hanazawa
Preceded by Mayu Asada	Pinky Ribbon Award for Best Actress; Yumika Hayashi; 2005	Succeeded by Akiho Yoshizawa
