= Yōichirō Takahashi =

Japanese film director

Yoichiro Takahashi
- Born: 1963 (age 62–63)
- Occupation: Film director
- Years active: 1992 – present

Yoichiro Takahashi (高橋 陽一郎, Takahashi Yōichirō; born 1963) is a Japanese film and television director who has mostly worked at NHK. His film Nichiyobi wa Owaranai was screened in the Un Certain Regard section at the 2000 Cannes Film Festival.

== Selected filmography ==
- Mizu no Naka no Hachigatsu (1997)
- Nichiyobi wa Owaranai (1999)
