= Love Hotel (1968 film) =

- Theatrical release poster
- Directed by: Shin'ya Yamamoto
- Production company: Tōkyō Kōei
- Distributed by: Shintōhō Eiga
- Release date: September 1968
- Running time: 71 minutes
- Country: Japan
- Language: Japanese

Love Hotel (アベック旅館, Avec Ryokan) aka Jitsuwa Repōto: Avec Ryojō (実話レポート アベック旅情) and A Rendezvous Hotel is a 1968 Japanese pink film directed by Shin'ya Yamamoto.

== Synopsis ==
When a prostitute at a love hotel passes out drunk, the voluptuous madam who owns the establishment must serve in her place.

== Cast ==
- Mieko Tanabe as Toyoko
- Kako Tachibana as Rumi
- Akiko Kozuki as Rinko
- Kyoko Ikeda as Hiromi
- Jun Yoshida

== Production ==
Director Shin'ya Yamamoto is known as one of the "Founding Fathers" of the pink film. In his Behind the Pink Curtain: The Complete History of Japanese Sex Cinema, Jasper Sharp credits Yamamoto with almost single-handedly injecting the element of light-hearted fun into pink cinema. His earliest films were in the serious and often misogynistic tone of many pink films of the era. Critics judged such early Yamamoto films as Degenerate (1967), Torture by a Woman (1967), and The Rapist (1968) to be technically superior to much of the pink product of the time, but not distinguished from them in terms of theme or style.

Yamamoto filmed Love Hotel for Tōkyō Kōei and it was released theatrically in Japan by Shintōhō Eiga in September 1968. With this film, Yamamoto found the style which would make him one of the most popular pink film directors for the next decade. His films of this period, such as the 15-film Widow's Boarding House series and his "Women's Onsen" films, are known for an interest in people living in group settings, and for a light, comical touch which was in direct contrast to most contemporary pink cinema, which tended to be darker in subject-matter. Even more so than the Widow's Boarding House scenario, which has been taken up by other directors, Yamamoto's Molester's Train series, which he started in 1975, has proven a prolific series of pink comedies. Academy Award-winning director Yōjirō Takita made the series his own in the 1980s, and Molester's Train films were still being made in the new millennium.

== Bibliography ==
=== English ===
- Avec riyokan (1968) at IMDb
- "AVEC RIYOKAN". Complete Index to World Film.
- Weisser, Thomas; Yuko Mihara Weisser (1998). Japanese Cinema Encyclopedia: The Sex Films. Miami: Vital Books : Asian Cult Cinema Publications. pp. 251–252. ISBN 1-889288-52-7.

=== Japanese ===
- 実話レポート アベック旅情 (in Japanese). Japanese Movie Database.
- アベック旅館 (in Japanese). Japanese Cinema Database (Agency for Cultural Affairs).
