= Shirō Shimomoto =

Japanese actor and director

- Born: Shirō Shimomoto; August 14, 1948 (age 76); Osaka
- Occupation(s): Actor; Director
- Years active: 1972-present

Shirō Shimomoto (下元史朗, Shimomoto Shirō) is a Japanese pink film actor and director from Osaka, Japan. He has been called "one of the most individual actors" in the world of pink film.

== Life and career ==
Shimomoto was born in Osaka, Japan on August 14, 1948. He started his career as an actor in director Banmei Takahashi’s pink films in the early 1970s. He has worked with Takahashi in many other films and has also starred in the works of other noted filmmakers, including, Kōji Wakamatsu, Akira Fumakachi, Kazuyuki Izutsu, and Shūji Kataoka among others, amassing a filmography of more than 250 pink films. He was given a Best Actor award at the first annual Pink Grand Prix covering the year 1988, and a second in 2006 for his performance in Shinji Imaoka's Mighty Extreme Woman a.k.a. Uncle's Paradise. Shimomoto wrote, directed, starred in and did the cinematography for 離婚妻快感ＯＮＡＮＩＥ, released by Shintōhō Eiga in 1992. Shimomoto was given a Best New Director, 2nd place award at the Pink Grand Prix for that year. Recently he has also starred in mainstream films and TV shows.

== Selected filmography ==
- Virgin Rope Makeover (1979)
- Waisetsu dokyumento renzoku henshitsu ma (ワイセツドキュメント 連続変質魔, Shintōhō Eiga, 1980)
- Girl Mistress (少女情婦 - Shōjo jōfu, Takahashi, 1980)
- Inquisition of a Girl Saint (聖少女拷問 - Sei shōjo gomon, Wakamatsu, 1980)
- Attacked Woman (襲られた女 - Yarareta onna, Takahashi, 1981)
- Crazy Affair: Pacifier (狂った情事 おしゃぶり - Kurutta joji: oshaburi, Isomura, 1981)
- Tattoo Ari (ＴＡＴＴＯＯ＜刺青＞あり - TATTOO <shisei> Ari, Takahashi Prod., 1982)
- Abused Slave Girl (虐待奴隷少女 - Gyakutai dorei shōjo, Yoneda, 1983)
- Cruel Documentary: Domesticated Animal Doll (残酷ドキュメント 家畜人形 - Zankoku document: kachiku ningyo, 1983)
- Girl And The Wooden Horse Torture (団鬼六 少女木馬責め - Dan Oniroku Shōjo Mokuba-zeme, Kato, 1983)
- Serial Rape: Attack! (連続暴行犯す - Renzoku Boko: Okasu!, Fukuoka, 1983)
- Office Lady: Wet and Falling (ＯＬ・濡れて堕ちる - OL: nurete ochiru, Masuda, 1983)
- Female Prisoners: Brutal Treatment (Joshu zankoku shikei, Kataoka, 1984)
- High Noon Ripper (真昼の切り裂き魔 - Mahiru no kirisaki-ma, Takita, 1984)
- Abnormal Family: Older Brother's Bride (変態家族兄貴の嫁さん - Hentai kazoku: aniki no yome-san, Suō, 1984)
- Disgraced! Uniform Virgin (凌辱！制服処女 - Ryojoku! seifuku shojo, Fukuoka, 1985)
- Mad Love! Lolita Poaching (激愛！ロリータ密猟 - Gekiai Lolita mitsuro, Satō, 1985)
- S&M Hunter Begins a.k.a. Hanging Upside-Down Bondage (逆さ吊し縛り縄 - Sakasa Tsurushi Shibari-nawa, Kataoka, 1985)
- S&M Hunter - Legend of Yakuza （SM倫子のおもらし) (1986)
- S&M Hunter a.k.a. Bondage SM: 18 Years Old (地獄のローパー、緊縛・SM・18才(SMクレーン、宙吊り, Kinbaku • SM • 18-sai, Kataoka, 1986)
- Almost Ripe Madonna: Tasty Big Thighs (半熟マドンナ おいしい太腿 - Hanjuku madonna: oishii futomomo, Fukuoka, 1987)
- Call Girl Angel: Trap of Disgrace (ホテトル天使 恥辱の罠 - Hotetoru tenshi: chijoku no wana - Chinzei, 1988)
- Genuine Masturbation: Finger Play (本番ＯＮＡＮＩＥ 指戯 - Honban onanie: shigi, 1988, Yoneda)
- Subway Serial Rape: Lover Hunting (地下鉄連続レイプ 愛人狩り - Chikatetsu Renzoku Reipu: Aijin-Gari, 1988, Kataoka)
- High Class Call Girls: Ladies from Hell (ザ・高級売春 地獄の貴婦人 - The kokyu baishun: jigoku no kifujin, Kataoka, 1990)
- Inamura Jane (稲村ジェーン (1990)
- Serial Masturbation: Disorder (連続ＯＮＡＮＩＥ 乱れっぱなし - Renzoku onanie: midareppanashi, Ueno, 1994)
- The Dream of Garuda (1994)
- Anarchy in Japansuke (1999)
- Tokyo Booty Nights (団地の奥さん 同窓会に行く, 2004)
- Uncle's Paradise (2006)
- No Place to Go (2022), Sensei
