= Irresistible Angel: Suck It All Up =

Irresistable Angel: Suck It All Up
- Theatrical poster
- Directed by: Minoru Kunizawa
- Distributed by: OP Eiga
- Release date: October 10, 2003
- Running time: 60 minutes
- Country: Japan
- Language: Japanese

Irresistible Angel: Suck It All Up (悩殺天使 吸い尽くして, Nōsatsu Tenshi: Sūi Tsukushite) aka Sex * Beast * Battle * Front (性☆獣☆戦☆線, Sei☆Jū☆Sen☆Sen) (Note: The spelling "Irresistable" (sic) has widely spread in online sources.) is a 2003 Japanese action-adventure, science-fiction-themed pink film directed by Minoru Kunizawa. The story serves as a satire of the U.S. Marvel Comics superhero team, X-Men.

== Synopsis ==
In the movie, a female high school student discovers she has supernatural powers during an attack. Her first use of her power is to vaporize her attacker. Years later, her powers manifest whenever she is sexually aroused by her husband. She is transported to another dimension where she engages in nude battles with opponents. The role of Kageyama is played by Thunder Sugiyama, former IWA World Heavyweight Champion.

== Release ==
Irresistible Angel: Suck It All Up was released theatrically on October 10, 2003. Jasper Sharp writes that it is an "innovative and sexy" take on the X-Men story. The Japanese pink film community also gave the film high marks, naming it the 4th Best Film of the year at the Pink Grand Prix. Minoru Kunizawa was awarded Best Director, Tatsurō Kashihara for Best Screenplay, Ruri Tachibana for Best Actress 3rd Place, and Takuya Hasegawa for Best Cinematography for their work on the film at the Pink Grand Prix.

== Accolades ==
It was chosen as the fourth best pink film release of the year at the Pink Grand Prix. Other awards won by the film at the ceremony include Best Director, Best Screenplay, Best Actress 3rd Place, and Best Cinematography.

== Bibliography ==
- Sharp, Jasper (2008). Behind the Pink Curtain: The Complete History of Japanese Sex Cinema. Guildford: FAB Press. pp. 334, 350. ISBN 978-1-903254-54-7.
- 悩殺天使 吸い尽くして(2003) (in Japanese). Allcinema.net].
- "悩殺天使 吸い尽くして". Japanese Cinema Database (Agency for Cultural Affairs). Archived from the original on 2012-03-26.
