= Yūji Tajiri =

Japanese film director, screenwriter and actor

- Born: 1968 (age 57–58); Hokkaido, Japan
- Occupations: Film director Screenwriter; Actor
- Years active: 1997–present

Yūji Tajiri (田尻裕司, Tajiri Yūji) is a Japanese film director, screenwriter, and actor. He is one of the group of pink film directors collectively known as the "Seven Lucky Gods of Pink" (ピンク七福神, shichifukujin), a group which also includes Toshiya Ueno, Mitsuru Meike, Shinji Imaoka, Yoshitaka Kamata, Toshirō Enomoto and Rei Sakamoto.

== Life and career ==
Yūji Tajiri was born in a small town in Hokkaido in 1968. His main interest as a youth was watching movies, and he began writing his own film scripts and making 8mm films while a teenager. At this time he began sneaking into adult theaters, and was impressed by director Kichitaro Negishi's Roman Porno film Crazy Fruit (1981), a pink remake of Crazed Fruit (1956).

Tajiri moved to Tokyo and, while attending Teikyo University, continued his movie-going habits. He was impressed with Hisayasu Satō's Lolita: Vibrator Torture (1987), an independent pink film which he saw on a triple-bill with two Nikkatsu films. After he found an advertisement from Shishi studios for assistant director positions, he researched the studio. It had been founded by pink film veteran Kan Mukai and Satō had made Lolita: Vibrator Torture there. Shishi accepted Tajiri, and he began working at the studio as an assistant director in 1990. Starting as an assistant director, he worked with such directors as Satō and Takahisa Zeze.

Tajiri's directorial debut was with the 1997 film Go Go Train (イケイケ電車 ハメて、行かせて、やめないで！). His second film, Office Lady Love Juice (ＯＬの愛汁 ラブジュース, OL no aijiru: rabu jyūsu), was chosen as the Best Film of the year at the Pink Grand Prix, and Tajiri was given the Best Director award. The mainstream "Japanese Film Professional's Award" also awarded the film, choosing it as the seventh best release of the year. Tajiri's 2004 film, Twitch – You Are My Toy about erotic complications in the photography industry, won the bronze prize at the Pink Grand Prix. The film also won awards for Best Actress and Best Cinematography.

== Bibliography ==
=== English ===
- Sharp, Jasper (2008). Behind the Pink Curtain: The Complete History of Japanese Sex Cinema. Guildford: FAB Press. pp. 315, 361. ISBN 978-1-903254-54-7.
- Yûji Tajiri at IMDb

=== Japanese ===
- 田尻裕司 たじり・ゆうじ (in Japanese). allcinema.net.
- 田尻裕司 (in Japanese). Japanese Movie Database.
- "Variety Japan" 田尻裕司 （タジリユウジ） (in Japanese). Variety Japan.
- Zenba, Takehiro (2005-11-18). "インタビュー: 田尻裕司(映画監督) (Yūji Tajiri interview" (in Japanese). Creators Movie Magazine.
- Zenba, Takehiro (2005-12-05). "インタビュー: 田尻裕司(映画監督) Part2 (Yūji Tajiri interview, part 2)" (in Japanese). Creators Movie Magazine.

Awards and achievements
Pink Grand Prix
Preceded by Yutaka Ikejima for Moon Light Dinner	Pink Grand Prix for Best Director; Yūji Tajiri; 1999 for Office Lady Love Juice	Succeeded by Minoru Kunizawa for The Bride is Wet on the Wedding Night
