= Frog Song =

- Release poster
- Directed by: Shinji Imaoka
- Written by: Shinji Imaoka
- Produced by: Mitsuru Fukudawara; Kyoichi Masuko; Kazuto Morita
- Starring: Konatsu; Rinako Hirasawa
- Cinematography: Issaku Maei
- Edited by: Shōji Sakai
- Production company: Kokuei
- Distributed by: Shintōhō Eiga
- Release date: June 10, 2005
- Running time: 65 minutes
- Country: Japan
- Language: Japanese

Frog Song (かえるのうた, Kaeru no uta) originally released as Paid Companionship Story: Girls Who Want to Do It (援助交際物語 したがるオンナたち, Enjo-kōsai monogatari: shitagaru onna-tachi) is a 2005 Japanese pink film directed by Shinji Imaoka. It was chosen as Best Film of the year at the Pink Grand Prix ceremony. According to author Jasper Sharp, the title, "Frog Song" is a pun referring both to a full-sized frog costume found outside a train station and worn by one of the characters, and to the Japanese verb kaeru "to go home". The translation of the title of the film could thus also be "Going Home Song".

== Synopsis ==
Akemi is a housewife who discovers her husband has been cheating on her. She makes the acquaintance of a prostitute who hopes to become a manga artist. Another hopeful manga artist, Kyoko, also makes ends meet by working as a part-time prostitute. Akemi moves in with Kyoko and tolerating the practise of her profession while the two come to an understanding of each other's lives.

== Cast ==
- Konatsu as Akemi Kudo
- Rinako Hirasawa as Kyoko Ito
- Takeshi Itō as Jiro Kiyokawa
- Yōta Kawase as Saburo Kiyokawa
- Kurumi Nanase as Nagisa
- Mutsuo Yoshioka as Kudo

== Reception ==
The Pink film community awarded Frog Song with the title of Best Film at the Pink Grand Prix. Honors given to the film also included the Best Actress award, which was given to lead actress Konatsu, and Best New Actress for Rinako Hirasawa.

In his Behind the Pink Curtain, Anglophone pink film scholar Jasper Sharp writes that it is the upbeat nature of Imaoka's films which have helped make them popular with film audiences. Pointing out the musical scene which concludes the film, he writes, "...Another key to the popularity of Imaoka's films is that they often end on such uplifting high notes."

== Release ==
The film was first released theatrically under the title Paid Companionship Story: Girls Who Want to Do It. As with many pink films it was retitled when it was released on DVD. It was first released as Frog Song on DVD in Japan on January 14, 2006. It is under this title that the film is most widely known, and it has retained this title in international releases. Using the Frog Song title, Sacrament released the DVD with English subtitles in the U.S. on November 13, 2007.

== Bibliography ==
=== English ===
- Enjo-kôsai monogatari: shitagaru onna-tachi (2005) at IMDb
- Sharp, Jasper (2008). Behind the Pink Curtain: The Complete History of Japanese Sex Cinema. Guildford: FAB Press. p. 326. ISBN 978-1-903254-54-7.
- Vijn, Ard (2007-12-18). "FROG SONG DVD Review". twitchfilm.net.
- Wallis, John (2007-12-18). "Frog Song". DVD Talk.

=== Japanese ===
- かえるのうた(2005) (in Japanese). allcinema.net.
- かえるのうた (in Japanese). www.dmm.co.jp.
- 援助交際物語 したがるオンナたち (in Japanese). P.G. Web Site. Archived from the original on 2012-02-29.
- かえるのうた (in Japanese). www.walkerplus.com.
- 満を持して"躍動"する、いまおかしんじ監督最新作: 「援助交際物語 したがるオンナたち」に注目！ (in Japanese). www.walkerplus.com. 2005-07-21.
- かえるのうた (in Japanese). .Spotted Productions. 2005-07-21. Archived from the original on 2009-01-29.

Preceded by Lunch Box	Pink Grand Prix for Best Film; 2005	Succeeded by Fascinating Young Hostess: Sexy Thighs
