= Mitsuru Meike =

Japanese actor and director

- Born: May 11, 1969 (age 57); Yokohama, Kanagawa Prefecture, Japan
- Occupations: Film director, screenwriter, actor
- Years active: 1996–present

Mitsuru Meike (女池充, Meike Mitsuru) is a Japanese film director, screenwriter, and actor. He is one of the group of prominent pink film directors known collectively as the "Seven Lucky Gods of Pink" (ピンク七福神, shichifukujin) which comprises Meike, Toshiya Ueno, Yūji Tajiri, Shinji Imaoka, Yoshitaka Kamata, Toshirō Enomoto and Rei Sakamoto.

== Life and career ==
Mitsuru Meike's introduction to the film industry was as assistant director to prominent female pink film director Sachi Hamano. He later worked at Outcast Produce with Toshiya Ueno and under the mentorship of "Four Heavenly Kings of Pink" (ピンク四天王, pinku shitenno) director, Toshiki Satō, whom he served as assistant director beginning in 1992. Meike's directorial debut was with the V-cinema film, Confinement (監禁, Kankin) (1996). He made his theatrical directorial debut in 1997 with Shintōhō Eiga's Lascivious Nurse Uniform Diary: Two or Three Times, While I'm Wet for which he won the Best New Director prize at the Pink Grand Prix. His 2002 film Shameful Family: Pin Down Technique won Meike the Best Director title, and was named the fifth best pink release of the year at the Pink Grand Prix.

Meike is one of the most experimental and daring of the shichifukujin directors. His 2003 film The Glamorous Life of Sachiko Hanai concerns a call-girl who becomes a super-genius after she is inadvertently shot by a North Korean in negotiations with a Middle Eastern man in a coffee shop. A frantic search for a rubber model of George W. Bush's finger, capable of releasing the U.S.'s nuclear arsenal, ensues. The film became a surprise international hit, playing at 20 film festivals and having a theatrical release in the U.S. in 2006.

== Award-winning films ==
=== "Ten Best" films, Pink Grand Prix ===
- 1997 7th place: Lascivious Nurse Uniform Diary: Two or Three Times, While I'm Wet (白衣いんらん日記 濡れたまま二度､三度, Hakui inran nikki: nureta mama nido, sando)
- 1998 8th place: ぐしょ濡れ美容師 すけべな下半身
- 2002 5th place: Shameful Family: Pin Down Technique (ハレンチ・ファミリー 寝ワザで一発, Harenchi*famirii)
- 2004 10th place: Bitter Sweet (濃厚不倫 とられた女, Nōkō furin: torareta onna)

=== Pinky Ribbon Awards ===
- 2004 Pearl Prize: Bitter Sweet (濃厚不倫 とられた女, Nōkō furin torareta onna)

== Bibliography ==
=== English ===
- Mitsuru Meike (I) at IMDb
- "MITSURU MEIKE". Complete Index to World Film.
- Sharp, Jasper (2008). Behind the Pink Curtain: The Complete History of Japanese Sex Cinema. Guildford: FAB Press. pp. 317–20, 350–51, etc. ISBN 978-1-903254-54-7.

=== Japanese ===
- 女池充 めいけ・みつる (in Japanese). allcinema.net.
- 女池充 (in Japanese). Japanese Movie Database.
- "Variety Japan" 女池充 （メイケミツル） (in Japanese). Variety Japan.
- 女池 充 (in Japanese). Director's Guild of Japan. Archived from the original on 2007-10-10.
- Fujimori, Ayako (2005-12-05). "海外の映画祭で大爆笑!! 日本凱旋上映となった; 「花井さちこの華麗な生涯」の女池充監督; 独占インタビュー&初日密着レポート! (Interview with Mitsuru Meike)" (in Japanese). www.walkerplus.com. Archived from the original on 2009-01-04.

Awards and achievements
Pink Grand Prix
| Preceded by Toshiro Enomoto for Forbidden Affair: Adulterous Wife Legs Spread Wide Open | Pink Grand Prix for New Best Director; Mitsuru Meike; 1997 for Lascivious Nurse Uniform Diary: Two or Three Times, While I'm Wet | Succeeded by Yoshitaka Kamata for Dangerous Affair: Drool of the Beast |
| Preceded by Tarō Araki for Sister-in-Law's Wet Thighs | Pink Grand Prix for Best Director; Mitsuru Meike; 2002 for Shameful Family: Pin Down Technique | Succeeded by Minoru Kunizawa for Irresistable Angel: Suck It All Up |
