= Sakurako Kaoru =

Japanese pornographic actress (born 1982)

- 薫桜子/薰櫻子
- Born: November 22, 1982 (age 42); Tokyo, Japan
- Occupation: Actress
- Height: 1.57 m (5 ft 2 in)
- Website: blog.livedoor.jp/kaorusakurako

Sakurako Kaoru (Japanese: 薫桜子/薰櫻子, Hepburn: Kaoru Sakurako) is a Japanese gravure model, AV idol and pink film actress. First coming to prominence as an AV actress, Kaoru successfully made the transition to the theatrically released softcore pink film genre. She has appeared in award-winning pink films, and was herself given a "Best Actress" award for her work in this genre in 2007.

== Life and career ==
Sakurako Kaoru was born in Tokyo on November 22, 1982.

=== AV career ===
Sakurako Kaoru made her AV debut in the July 2002 Kuki release 101 Litre Girl. Kaoru's second three videos for Kuki were all under director Happy Yamada, whom fellow AV idol Milk Ichigo described as a, "really weird man... a really interesting person, very unique." In late 2002 and early 2003, Kaoru appeared in several prominent men's magazines from Weekly Playboy (October 2002) to Flash (January 2003).

At the beginning of 2003, Kaoru made her first video for the VIP studio, Very Rare. She also began an association with the Crystal Eizō company at this time, first appearing for the studio in Female Breasts: Sakurako Kaoru (February 2003). She was the company's AV actress interview for April 2003. Kaoru appeared in Akihabara, Tokyo in September 2003, for a signing event for Crystal Eizō. In an interview she expressed concerns that no one would show up to meet her, but warmly greeted those in attendance, signing a T-shirt for the winner of a ro-sham-bo contest. After a question-and-answer session, Kaoru shook hands with her fans.

She began appearing for the TMA studio in October 2003 with Fetish Angle Big Breasts. Kaoru's retirement from the AV world was with Buck-Naked Bomber Boobs Lessons: Sakurako Kaoru's Retirement Work (August 2004, I Energy). In this video, Kaoru played the role of a buxom teacher who arouses the attention of her students and the school staff. In a December 2005 article on the subject, Kaoru was listed as one of the group of AV idols who maintained a blog. Since concentrating on the V-cinema and pink film genres, Kaoru has appeared in at least one more AV, the June 2005 release, New High School Teacher's Training: Season of Cherry.

=== Pink film career ===
Sakurako Kaoru appeared in the V-cinema release Mikosurihan Theater, based on the manga of the same name in June 2004, and left AV for the theatrical softcore pink film genre soon after. In 2005 she co-starred in major AV-idol and pink film actress Yumika Hayashi's last film, Miss Peach: Peachy Sweetness Huge Breasts (ミスピーチ 巨乳は桃の甘み, Misu Piichi: kyonyū wa momo no umami) (2005), by female director Yumi Yoshiyuki. The film was released in September, after Hayashi's untimely death in June, and chosen as fifth best pink release of the year 2005 at the "Pink Grand Prix". Yoshiyuki's Big Tit Sisters: Blow Through the Valley (巨乳な姉妹～谷間に吸いつけ～ - Kyonyū na shimai * tanima ni fuitsuke), which starred Kaoru, was chosen as the seventh best pink film released during the year 2006 at the "Pink Grand Prix" awards ceremony. Under the title Three Rules for Being a Witch (魔女になるための３つのルール, Majo ni narutame no mittsu no rūru) the film was presented at the Yūbari International Fantastic Film Festival. Kaoru's Naked Three Sisters: Lewdness (裸の三姉妹 淫交, Hadaka no sanshimai: inkō) was also chosen as the 10th best film at the Pink Grand Prix for that year. In its pink top-ten list for the year, the walkerplus.com film site picked Big Tit Sisters as the sixth best pink film of the year, and another film starring Kaoru, Wife and Secretary: Overflowing Love Juice (人妻とＯＬ あふれる愛液, Hitozuma to OL: afureru ai-eki), for ninth place. The following year, Kaoru was given a Best Actress award at the "Pink Grand Prix" ceremony for her performance in another Yoshiyuki film, Adultery Addiction: Sensual Daze (不倫中毒 官能のまどろみ - Furinchūdoku: kannō no madoromi).

== Bibliography ==
- "Kaoru (Sakurako Kaoru); AV Idol Directory". xxx.xcity.jp/idol.
- "薫桜子 (Sakurako Kaoru: profile)" (in Japanese). crystal-eizou.jp. 2004-03-26. Archived from the original on 2011-10-02.
- "2003年4月のインタビュー：薫桜子 (March 20, 2003 interview: Sakurako Kaoru)" (in Japanese). crystal-eizou.jp. 2003-04-01. Archived from the original on 2009-02-14.
- "薫桜子ちゃんの情熱の赤パンティオークション！ (Sakurako Kaoru: Panty auction)" (in Japanese). crystal-eizou.jp. 2003-02-11. Archived from the original on 2009-02-14.
- "薫 桜子 - Kaoru Sakurako" (in Japanese). 'Web I-dic' (Idol Dictionary). Archived from the original on 2009-02-14.
- "Kaoru Sakurako 薫桜子". Urabon Navigator.
- "薫桜子 (Actress information)" (in Japanese). www.dmm.co.jp.
- "薫桜子 (Actress profile)" (in Japanese). www.av-channel.com.
- "薫桜子 (Sakurako Kaoru)" (in Japanese). AV 研究所 (AV Research Laboratory). Archived from the original on 2007-10-08.
- "薫桜子 (Sakurako Kaoru)" (in Japanese). Japanese Movie Database.

Awards and achievements
Pinky Ribbon Awards
| Preceded by Sora Aoi; Mai Sakurazuki; Konatsu; Kyōko Natsume | Pinky Ribbon Award for Best New Actress; Sakurako Kaoru; 2005; With: Mari Yamaguchi; Komari Awashima; Erina Aoyama | Succeeded by Yuria Hidaka |
