= Tarō Araki =

Japanese actor and director

- Born: February 16, 1961 (age 65); Tokyo, Japan
- Occupations: Film director screenwriter actor
- Years active: 1981 –

Tarō Araki (荒木太郎, Araki Tarō; born February 16, 1961) is a Japanese film director, screenwriter, and actor. Including Yutaka Ikejima, Yumi Yoshiyuki and Minoru Kunizawa, Araki is one of the four top pink film directors of Ōkura Productions (OP) at the turn of the millennium.

== Life and career ==
Tarō Araki first entered the film industry as an extra in 1981. He began his behind-the-camera work through Kokuei studio in 1985. There he worked as assistant director on such films as Yukio Kitazawa's Wet Virgin: Obscene Assault (1985) and Kazuhiro Sano's first film as director, Capturing: Dirty Foreplay (監禁 ワイセツな前戯, Kankin: waisetsuna zengi) aka Last Bullet. Araki often appears as an actor in his films as well as in films by other directors. His performance in Parade (パレード) (1995) earned Araki a Best Actor, 2nd Place award at the Pink Grand Prix.

Araki's directorial debut was with 異常露出・見せたがり in 1996. His approach to the pink film is different from that of many of the more prominent directors of the last two decades such as the groups known as the "Four Heavenly Kings of Pink" (ピンク四天王, pinku shitenno) and "Seven Lucky Gods of Pink" (ピンク七福神, shichifukujin). Araki has a more populist impulse to his filmmaking, and is a vocal opponent of making a film to please one's self rather than the audience. He intentionally tries to please the traditional theatrical pink film audience, particularly those outside the large cities, rather than the more intellectual critics and fans who are represented by P*G magazine and the Pink Grand Prix ceremony. Nevertheless, Araki has proven himself a successful director at the Pink Grand Prix. Besides the acting and Best New Director awards, Araki's film Sad and Painful Search: Office Lady Essay (2000) was chosen as Best Film, and his Sister-in-Law's Wet Thighs (2001) earned Araki an award for Best Director. Additionally, he has had numerous films on the Pink Grand Prix's yearly Top-Ten list.

== Partial filmography ==
=== Pink Grand Prix ===
- 2000 1st place: Sad and Painful Search: Office Lady Essay (せつなく求めて ＯＬ編, Setsunaku Motomete: OL Hen)
- 2001 4th place: Sister-in-Law's Wet Thighs (義姉さんの濡れた太もも, Gishisan no Nureta Futomomo)
- 2001 Honorable mention: Immoral First Love: Loving from the Nipples (初恋不倫 乳首から愛して, Hatsukoifurin: Chikubi kara Aishite)
- 2002 7th place: Molester's Bus 2: Heat of the Over Thirty (痴漢バス２ 三十路の火照り, Chikan Basu 2: Misoji no Hoteri)
- 2002 10th place: Older Woman: Hakata Beauty's Shyness (年上の女 博多美人の恥じらい, Toshiue no Onna: Hakata Bijin no Hajirai)
- 2003 6th place: Beautiful Breast Violence: Indecent Nude (美乳暴行 ひわいな裸身, Binyū bōkō: hiwai na ratai)
- 2003 8th place: The Girl Next Door: Taste of Short Steps (隣のお姉さん 小股の斬れ味, Tonari no Onesan: Komata no Kireaji)
- 2004 2nd place: Housekeeper with Beautiful Skin: Made Wet with Finger Torture (美肌家政婦 指責め濡らして, Mihada Kaseifu: Yubi-zeme Nurashite)
- 2008 7th place: 悶々不倫 教え子は四十路妻

=== Pinky Ribbon Awards ===
- 2004 Gold prize: Housekeeper with Beautiful Skin: Made Wet with Finger Torture (美肌家政婦 指責め濡らして, Mihada kaseifu: yubi zeme nurashite)
- 2004 Pearl prize: Shokudō no o neesan inran ni jimi jiru (食堂のお姉さん 淫乱にじみ汁)
- 2005 Silver prize: Huge Tits G-Cup: Rapturous Valley (爆乳Ｇカップ とろける谷間, Bakunyū G kappu: torokeru tanima)

== Bibliography ==
=== English ===
- Sharp, Jasper (2008). Behind the Pink Curtain: The Complete History of Japanese Sex Cinema. Guildford: FAB Press. pp. 334–35, 342, etc. ISBN 978-1-903254-54-7.
- Taro Araki (I) at IMDb
- "TARO ARAKI". Complete Index to World Film.

=== Japanese ===
- 荒木太郎 あらき・たろう (in Japanese). allcinema.net.
- 荒木太郎 (in Japanese). Japanese Movie Database.
- 荒木太郎 (in Japanese). Kinema Junpo. Archived from the original on 2011-10-07.

Awards and achievements
Pink Grand Prix
Preceded by Minoru Kunizawa for The Bride is Wet on the Wedding Night	Pink Grand Prix for Best Director; Tarō Araki; 2001 for Sister-in-Law's Wet Thighs	Succeeded by Mitsuru Meike for Shameless Family
