= Shinji Imaoka =

Japanese film director, screenwriter, and actor

- Born: 1965 (age 60–61); Sakai, Osaka, Japan
- Occupations: Film director, screenwriter, and actor
- Years active: 1995–
- Website: http://pink2000s.cocolog-nifty.com/

Shinji Imaoka (今岡信治 or いまおかしんじ, いまおかしんぢ, Imaoka Shinji) a.k.a. 羅門ナカ is a Japanese film director, screenwriter, and actor. He is one of a group of pink film directors of the 2000s known collectively as the "Seven Lucky Gods of Pink" (ピンク七福神, shichifukujin), which besides Imaoka, also includes Toshiya Ueno, Mitsuru Meike, Yūji Tajiri, Yoshitaka Kamata, Toshirō Enomoto and Rei Sakamoto.

== Life and career ==
Shinji Imaoka was born in Osaka in 1965. He attended Yokohama City University, but dropped out in 1990 in order to pursue a film career. He entered the film industry as an assistant director at pink film pioneer Satoru Kobayashi's Shishi Productions. There he worked principally under Hisayasu Satō, and also with such directors at Takahisa Zeze and Mototsugu Watanabe. In December 1994 he worked as assistant director to the esteemed Nikkatsu Roman Porno director Tatsumi Kumashiro on his last film, Immoral: Indecent Relations (インモラル･淫らな関係, Immoral: midarana kankei). Imaoka's directorial debut film was Sex Party of the Beasts: Come Together (獣たちの性宴・イクときいっしょ) a.k.a. Waiting for the Comet (1995).

In his Behind the Pink Curtain: The Complete History of Japanese Sex Cinema, Jasper Sharp writes that Imaoka's style is quite different from that of his mentor, Hisayasu Satō, and that his approach to the pink film is much closer to Toshiki Satō. Like Toshiki Satō, Imaoka's sex scenes are often sparser than the norm for a pink film, and not given much emphasis. According to Sharp, "[Imaoka's] films possess the same deadpan comic touch that masks a painfully honest emotional core, although Imaoka's peculiar brand of pathos is less wry and more sentimental." Further, he writes, "Imaoka's particular strength is his understated depiction of characters trapped in a rut, desperately reaching out for something they secretly know they can't have."

While Imaoka's approach to the sex scenes has not won him favor with the traditional pink film audience and theater owners, his films have been praised by critics. He has been awarded Best Director at the Pink Grand Prix, and two of his films have been voted the Best Film of the year at the ceremony. In 2000, the Tokyo Athénée Français gave Imaoka a career retrospective tribute which broke the institution's record for attendance.

== Partial filmography ==
=== Top-ten films, Pink Grand Prix ===
- 1996 Honorable Mention: The Wart (痴漢電車 感じるイボイボ, Chikan Densha: Kanjiru Iboibo)
- 1999 Honorable Mention: Despite All That / Sopping Wet Married Teacher: Doing It in Uniform (ぐしょ濡れ人妻教師 制服で抱いて, Gushonure hitozuma kyōshi - Seifuku de idaite)
- 1999 1st place: Lunch Box (熟女・発情 タマしゃぶり, Jukujō: hatsujō tamashaburi)
- 2005 1st place: Frog Song (かえるのうた, Kaeru no Uta)
- 2005 8th place: Mighty Extreme Woman (絶倫絶女, Zetsurin Zetsujo) a.k.a. Uncle's Paradise (おじさん天国, Ojisan Tengoku)

=== Pinky Ribbon Awards ===
- 2006 Silver Prize: Mighty Extreme Woman (絶倫絶女, Zetsurin zetsujo) a.k.a. Uncle's Paradise (おじさん天国, Ojisan tengoku)

== Bibliography ==
=== English ===
- Sharp, Jasper (2008). Behind the Pink Curtain: The Complete History of Japanese Sex Cinema. Guildford: FAB Press. pp. 323–326, 345, etc. ISBN 978-1-903254-54-7.
- Shinji Imaoka at IMDb

=== Japanese ===
- 今岡信治 いまおか・しんじ (in Japanese). allcinema.net.
- 今岡信治 (in Japanese). Japanese Movie Database.
- 今岡信治 (in Japanese). Kinema Junpo.
- いまおかしんじ (in Japanese). Kinema Junpo.
- 今岡信治 (in Japanese). www.walkerplus.com.
- 今岡 信治 (in Japanese). Director's Guild of Japan. Archived from the original on October 10, 2007.
- Imaoka, Shinji. "今岡信治 「デビューまで」 (Essay on debut film)" (in Japanese). Director's Guild of Japan. Archived from the original on 2015-12-22.
- Watanabe, Rintarō (2008-04-05). "いまおかしんじ インタビュー: 田尻裕司(映画監督) (Shinji Imaoka interview)" (in Japanese). Creators Movie Magazine.
- 満を持して"躍動"する、いまおかしんじ監督最新作: 「援助交際物語 したがるオンナたち」に注目！ (in Japanese). www.walkerplus.com]. 2005-07-21.
- "かえるのうた」いまおかしんじ監督インタビュー (Interview)" (in Japanese). www.cinematopics.com. 2006-01-16.
  - "かえるのうた」いまおかしんじ監督インタビュー (Interview, p.2)" (in Japanese). www.cinematopics.com. 2006-01-16.

Awards and achievements
Pink Grand Prix
Preceded by Minoru Kunizawa for Irresistable Angel: Suck It All Up	Pink Grand Prix for Best Director; Shinji Imaoka; 2004 for Lunch Box	Succeeded by Tetsuya Takehora for Lustful Hitchhiker: Sought Wife
