= Pink Grand Prix =

Award ceremony for erotic cinema

- Date: April 2019
- Venue: Shinbungeiza theater
- Country: Japan
- Hosted by: PG Magazine
- First award: 1989

The Pink Grand Prix (ピンク大賞, pinku taishō) or PG Film Prize (PG映画大賞, PG eiga taishō; "Pink film festival" or "Pink Prize") is an annual Japanese film award ceremony which recognizes excellence in the pink film genre. Referred to by Miho Toda as the "Academy Awards of the Pink Film", the ceremony attracts a diverse audience of industry personnel, film scholars and the general public.

Pink film scholar Jasper Sharp calls it the high point of the year for the pink film community.

PG, a magazine focusing on the genre, hosts the Pink Grand Prix in April of each year as a review of pink films released the previous year. The top ten films are selected by a readers' poll, and the top five films are screened during the evening of the ceremony held at the Kameari-za theater in Aoto, Tokyo until its closing in 1999, and at the Shinbungeiza theater thereafter.

== History ==
PG magazine was founded by Yoshiyuki Hayashida in July 1994. The magazine was preceded by the limited-circulation New Zoom-up, which Hayashida started in 1989, and which held the first Pink Grand Prix awards beginning that year, covering films released in 1988.

Among actresses who have won the award multiple times are Yumika Hayashi, recipient of the Best Actress award in 2004 and the Special Career Award the following year. After her death on June 28, 2005, she was awarded a second Special Career Award at the 2006 Pink Grand Prix ceremony.

== Yearly awards ==
- Pink Grand Prix for Best Film
- Pink Grand Prix for Best Actress
