= Kyōko Hashimoto =

Japanese adult video star (born 1964)

- 橋本杏子
- Born: February 15, 1964 (age 61); Saitama Prefecture, Japan
- Occupation: Actress

Kyōko Hashimoto (Japanese: 橋本杏子, Hepburn: Hashimoto Kyōko) is a Japanese model, pink film actress and an early adult video (AV) star.

== Life and career ==
=== AV debut ===
Hashimoto was born in Saitama Prefecture, Japan on February 15, 1964. She entered the adult video (AV) industry as early as 1984 with the video 3 Sisters Live Performance for the Boxland company. She also performed in a second Boxland video in 1984, Honban gāru anzu, chomechome sarechatta no Hashimoto Kyōko. Another early work was the 1986 Sexy Video Club 16 for the pioneering AV studio Cosmos Plan.

In the mid to late 1980s she also appeared in a number of hardcore uncensored underground ("urabon") photobooks.

=== Pink film ===
By late 1985, she was working in pink film, with a role in director Sachi Hamano's Misshitsuhen Taichōkyō (密室変態調教) which was released in October 1985 by Million Film. Two months later she appeared in the Nikkatsu Roman Porno film Zetsurin gal: Yaruki mun mun directed by Yōjirō Takita. Hashimoto again worked with director Takita in the March 1986 Nikkatsu Roman Porno production Za mania: Kaikan seitai jikken with a screenplay by Shirō Yumeno. In June 1986, Hashimoto had the starring role in Sexy Battle Girls for Shintōhō Eiga, a takeoff on the mid-1980s television show Sukeban Deka, where she plays a high-school girl who battles an evil headmaster using her special sexual ability, the "Venus Crush". At the 8th Zoom-Up Film Festival in 1987, Hashimoto won the Best Actress award for her films in 1986.

In another Shintōhō Eiga film, the 1987 Lesbian Harem directed by Tomoaki Hosoyama, Hashimoto played a lesbian who with her lover have decided to commit suicide but are instead enslaved by the queen of a lesbian realm. In 1989, Hashimoto received further recognition for her pink film performances, garnering a Best Supporting Actress award at the first Pink Grand Prix ceremony for her work in the 1988 Genuine Masturbation: Finger Play and other films. Among her other 1988 films was Last Cabaret, the second to last of Nikkatsu's Roman Porno series. The film, about a cabaret forced to close and the owner's daughter, who, depressed over the situation, searches for the club's former hostesses (Hashimoto among them), has been taken as a metaphor for the demise of the studio itself.

In 1989, Hashimoto performed in two pink film projects for director Masahiro Kasai and Cinema Ark. The first was the supernatural themed Abnormal Excitement: Nao Saejima in October, which won Best Film of the year at the Pink Grand Prix ceremony. Then she appeared in the November 1989 release Molester's Train: Get On from The Back!, part of the long-running Molester's Train series.

Hashimoto took one of the Best Actress awards for 1991 films at the Pink Grand Prix for her starring role in The Masturbating Lesbians, which was directed by Yutaka Ikejima and distributed by Xces. In the six years from late 1985 to the end of 1991, Hashimoto appeared in at least 90 films, many of them for the Shintōhō Eiga studio. This was a period of crisis for the pink film industry largely caused by the advent of adult videos in Japan and Hashimoto was known as "the last pink actress" (最後のピンク女優), with the meaning that she was likely to be the last successful actress in the genre.

=== Later career ===
In November 1992, Hashimoto had a featured role in a mainstream film, the superhero comedy Daikansho kamen (大感傷仮面), and in 1995 she had a small role as a reporter in the video (and later film) Weather Woman for director Tomoaki Hosoyama, with whom she had earlier worked in Lesbian Harem.

Hashimoto had retired from the pink film scene but returned in September 2002 when she once again teamed up with director Yutaka Ikejima in his Delivery Health Girl: The Moisture of Silken Skin where she played Akino, a delivery health girl (call girl). In November 2003, she starred in another pink film, Lesbian Mother-in-Law: Son Exchange with Motoko Sasaki.

Hashimoto also resumed work in adult videos in 2002 co-starring with Madoka Ozawa and Yumika Hayashi in the Moodyz production Shitamachi Mixed Bathouse Story. Then from 2009 to 2012, she appeared in five videos for Attackers (including two entries in their "Slave Castle" series), all directed by Shinichi Kawamura.

== Pink films ==
Release date	Film title	Studio	Director	Notes
1986-06	Sexy Battle Girls	Shintōhō Eiga	Mototsugu Watanabe	With Yukijiro Hotaru and Yutaka Ikejima
1987-04-18	Lesbian Harem	Shintōhō Eiga	Tomoaki Hosoyama	With Reika Kano and Chiemi Akimoto
1989-10-13	Abnormal Excitement: Nao Saejima	Cinema Ark / Xces	Masahiro Kasai	With Nao Saejima
1989-11-24	Molester's Train: Get On from The Back!	Cinema Ark / Xces	Masahiro Kasai	With Yuka Ishihara
