= Megumi Makihara =

Japanese actress

- Born: Japan

Megumi Makihara (槇原めぐみ or 槙原めぐみ or 慎原めぐみ, Makihara Megumi) is a Japanese actress known for her appearances in the pink film genre. She has appeared in award-winning pink films, and was herself given a "Best Actress" award for her work in 1997.

== Career ==
Megumi Makihara has appeared in pink films and V-cinema for several notable directors. Her performance in Takahisa Zeze's Scent of a Female: Rapturous Pistil (1996), won Makihara the Best New Actress, 4th place at the Pink Grand Prix, and the film was selected as third best pink film release of the year. The director with whom Makihara worked most was Tarō Araki, who is considered one of OP Eiga's top directors. Araki appears as an actor in his films with Makihara, and Makihara is also credited with the music to the director's 1997 films Gift (おくりもの, Okurimono) and The Nurse's Private Life: Violent Girls' Dorm (白衣の私生活 乱行女子寮, Hakui no shiseikatsu rangyō joshiryō).

Makihara appeared in director Mitsuru Meike's debut, Lascivious Nurse Uniform Diary: Two or Three Times, While I'm Wet (1997), which won Meike the Best New Director title at the Pink Grand Prix, and was named the seventh best pink release of the year. Makihara was awarded the Best Actress of the year at the same ceremony for her performance in Yutaka Ikejima's Big Tits * Beautiful Tits * Obscene Tits: Rubbing Competition. She appeared onscreen with Ikejima in the gay-themed ENK studio's New Gay Bar Love Story. She worked with Meike again in his V-cinema release, Confession of a New Nurse (1998).

Along with AV idol Yumika Hayashi, Makihara appeared in the third episode of the drama series Kurumaisu no bengoshi Mizushima Takeshi (車椅子の弁護士水島威). Titled "Bijin konpanion satsujin jiken" (美人コンパニオン殺人事件), the episode aired on TV Asahi on July 26, 1997.

== Partial filmography ==
Title	Release date	Director	Studio	Notes
=== Films ===
Scent of a Female: Rapturous Pistil 牝臭 とろける花芯; Meshū: torokeru kashin	1996-07-26	Takahisa Zeze	Kokuei; Shintōhō Eiga	Third Best Film of the Year, Pink Grand Prix; Best New Actress, 4th Place: Makihara
Family Plays with a Genuinely Perverted Woman 真性痴女といじくる家族; Shinsei chijo to ijikuru kazoku	1996-11-09	Tarō Araki	Tarō Productions; OP Eiga	60 min. With Tarō Araki
New Gay Bar Love Story 新・ハッテンバ・ラブ・ストーリー; Shin hattenba rabu sutoorii	1997-05-02	Ryūji Yamamoto	ENK	With Yutaka Ikejima
The Nurse's Private Life: Violent Girls' Dorm 白衣の私生活 乱行女子寮; Hakui no shiseikatsu rangyō joshiryō	1997-06-13	Tarō Araki	OP Eiga	With Tarō Araki
Lecherous Beautiful Big Tits: Juicy Flesh 淫乱美巨乳 たわわな媚肉; Inran bikyonyū tawawana biniku	1997-07-14	Tarō Araki	Tarō Productions; OP Eiga	60 min. With Yumi Yoshiyuki and Tarō Araki
Lascivious Nurse Uniform Diary: Two or Three Times, While I'm Wet 白衣いんらん日記 濡れたまま二度、三度; Hakui inran nikki: nureta mama nido, sando	1997-08-29	Mitsuru Meike	Shintōhō Eiga	60 min.
Violent Taxi 暴行タクシー ハメられた女たち; Bōkō takushii: hamerareta onnatachi	1997-09-12	Sachio Kitazawa	Iizumi Productions	60 min.
Big Tits * Beautiful Tits * Obscene Tits: Rubbing Competition 巨乳・美乳・淫乳 ～揉みくらべ～ Kyonyū*binyū*innyū: ~momikurabe~	1997-09-20	Yutaka Ikejima	Cement Match; OP Eiga	Best Actress, Pink Grand Prix: Makihara; With Yutaka Ikejima and Kyōko Kazama
Perverted Wife: Spied Upon 変態妻 ハメられて覗かれて; Hentaizuma: hamerarete nozokarete	1997-10-01	Tarō Araki	Tarō Productions; OP Eiga	60 min. With Tarō Araki and Yumika Hayashi
Dental Surgeon Wife: Chafed Thighs 人妻歯科医 こすれる太股 hitozuma shikai: kosureru futomomo	1997-12-12	Sakae Nitta	Xces	With Satomi Shinozaki
Sticky Juice of the Lady with a Wet Ass 濡れ尻女将のねばり汁; Nurejiri okami no nebari jiru	1997-12-13	Tarō Araki	Tarō Productions; OP Eiga	60 min. With Tarō Araki and Yumika Hayashi
Lecherous Family: Immoral, Lusty Widow いんらん家族 好色不倫未亡人; Inran kazoku: kōshoku furin mibōjin	1997-12-26	Akira Fukamachi	Shintōhō Eiga	60 min. With Yutaka Ikejima
Adored Angel in White: Sweaty Caresses 憧れの白衣の天使 愛撫でびっしょり; Akogare no hakui no tenshi: aibu de bisshori	1998-03-10	Kazuyoshi Sekine	Sekine Productions; OP Eiga	61 min. With Yumi Yoshiyuki

Title	Release date	Director	Studio	Notes
=== V-Cinema ===
Molester's Caboose: Sexy Platform 痴漢終電車 官能プラットホーム; Chikan shūdensha: kannō purattohoomu	1998-02-27	Kazuto Kubodera	Legend Pictures	61 min.
Confession of a New Nurse 告白新人看護婦; Kokuhaku shinjin kangofu	1998-03	Mitsuru Meike	Image Factory	60 min.
Embarkation Diary: Stewardess' Warning 搭乗日誌 スチュワーデスの危ない警告; Tōjō nisshi: suchuwaadesu no abunai keikoku	1998-05-04	Tarō Sugiyama	Caress Communications	74 min.
Pervert Story: Finger-Tease in a Forbidden Place 痴漢物語 イケナイところの指いじめ; Chikan monogatari: ikenai tokoro no yubi ijime	1998-05-22	Asao Taiga	TMC	75 min.
Bottled Vulva: Bank Teller Noriko; Binzume nyoin: Ginkōin · Noriko	1998	Shinji Imaoka	J·nex	Adult/Horror
Molester's Caboose Special 痴漢終電車スペシャル; Chikan shūdensha supesharu	2004	Kazuto Kubodera		80 min. With Yumika Hayashi

== Bibliography ==
=== English ===
- Megumi Makihara at IMDb

=== Japanese ===
- 槇原めぐみ まきはら・めぐみ (in Japanese). allcinema.net.
- "槇原めぐみ（まきはらめぐみ） (Profile and filmography)" (in Japanese). www.dmm.co.jp.
- 槙原めぐみ (in Japanese). Japanese Movie Database. Archived from the original on April 17, 2008.

Awards and achievements
Pink Grand Prix
Preceded by Hotaru Hazuki for Adultery Diary: One More Time While I'm Still Wet	Pink Grand Prix for Best Actress; Megumi Makihara; 1997 for Big Tits * Beautiful Tits * Obscene Tits: Rubbing Competition	Succeeded by Yoko Chōsokabe for Shinjuku Diary: Scaredy Cat
