= Molester's Train: Nasty Behavior =

- Theatrical poster for Molester's Train: Nasty Behavior (1993)
- Directed by: Hisayasu Satō (as Hisakazu Hata)
- Written by: Kyōko Godai
- Starring: Yumika Hayashi; Kiyomi Itō
- Cinematography: Masashi Inayoshi
- Edited by: Shōji Sakai
- Distributed by: Kokuei; Shintōhō Eiga
- Release date: November 26, 1993
- Running time: 54 minutes
- Country: Japan
- Language: Japanese

Molester's Train: Nasty Behavior (痴漢電車 いやらしい行為, Chikan densha: iyarashii kōi) aka Molester's Train: Dirty Behavior and Birthday (誕生日, Tanjōbi) is a 1993 Japanese pink film directed by Hisayasu Satō under the pseudonym Hisakazu Hata as part of the Molester's Train series. Future director, Shinji Imaoka worked on the project as assistant director, and prolific screenwriter Kyōko Godai wrote the film. It was named the second best pink film release of the year at the annual Pink Grand Prix.

== Synopsis ==
After the loss of her boyfriend, a young woman plans to blow herself up with a stick of dynamite on her 20th birthday. On the subway, she meets a young man who films women while molesting them. The two become romantically involved.

== Cast ==
- Yumika Hayashi
- Koichi Imaizumi (今泉浩一)
- Kiyomi Ito
- Yuri Ishihara (石原ゆり)
- Hiroyuki Kawasaki (川崎浩幸)

== Background ==
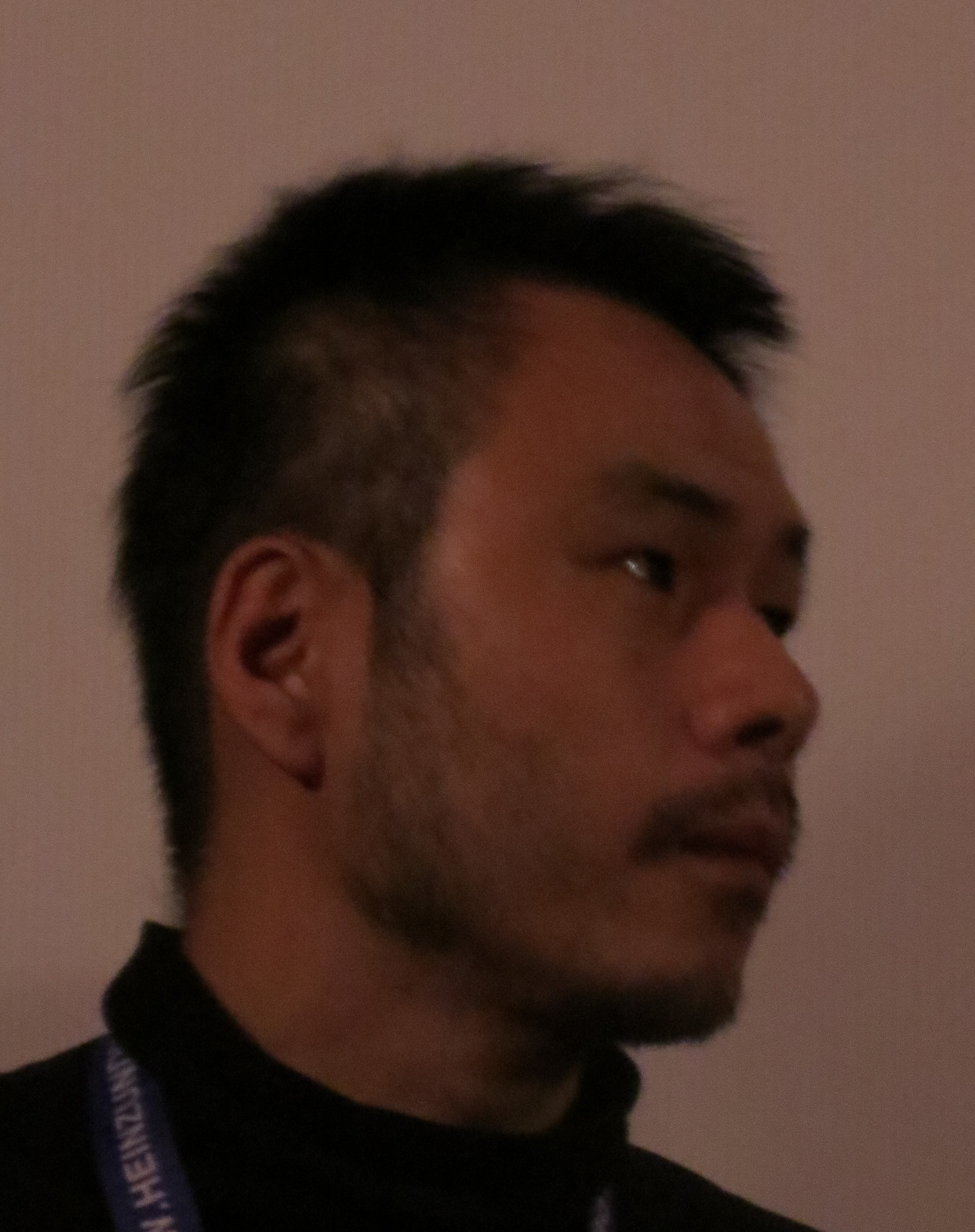
Koichi Imaizumi, who played one of the main characters, in 2013

Future Academy Award-winner Yōjirō Takita started the long-running Molester's Train series at Shintōhō Eiga. The original series ran for twelve episodes between 1982 and 1985 and was in a light-comic vein similar to early U.S. nudie-cuties such as Russ Meyer's The Immoral Mr. Teas (1959). The popularity of the "Molester" theme led other pink film studios to create their own versions of the series. When they decided to resurrect the series in 1993, Shintōhō Eiga chose to go in an entirely different direction by hiring controversial, cult-film director Hisayasu Satō to helm the project.

== Critical appraisal ==
Allmovie writes that, working within Shintōhō Eiga's Molester's Train series format, Molester's Train: Nasty Behavior is, "much tamer than [Hisayasu Satō's] usual sadistic gorefests", and that his fans, "may be disappointed that there is nary a rape, whipping, or bloody tooth extraction in sight". The review speculates that the softening in tone from Satō may be a result of the input from Kyōko Godai. Godai is a prolific pink film screenwriter and wife of actor-director Yutaka Ikejima.

In their Japanese Cinema Encyclopedia: The Sex Films, the Weissers note that in Molester's Train: Nasty Behavior, Satō shows none of his characteristic cinematic brutality. They write of his comparatively tamer films with Godai, "Some praise Sato for the change, while other lose interest in his career". Nevertheless, Jasper Sharp writes that Satō's film still has an austere tone which is completely different in style from Yōjirō Takita's light-hearted Molester Train films. Sharp notes that Molester's Train: Nasty Behavior exhibits many of Satō's usual interests, including a sequence employing a "disorienting labyrinth of gazes" involving the young male molester, his films, his victim on the train, another molester's victim, and the audience. The audience is given little help in how to interpret the proceedings. "Who do we identify with," Sharp asks, "molester, molested or cameraman, or do we remain just a detached observer?"

== Bibliography ==
=== English ===
- Chikan densha: Iyarashii koui (1993) at IMDb
- "CHIKAN DENSHA: IYARASHII KOUI". Complete Index to World Film.
- Sharp, Jasper (2008). Behind the Pink Curtain: The Complete History of Japanese Sex Cinema. Guildford: FAB Press. pp. 265, 267, 270, 271, 299, 357. ISBN 978-1-903254-54-7.
- Weisser, Thomas; Yuko Mihara Weisser (1998). Japanese Cinema Encyclopedia: The Sex Films. Miami: Vital Books : Asian Cult Cinema Publications. p. 476. ISBN 1-889288-52-7.

=== Japanese ===
- 誕生日(1993) (in Japanese). allcinema.net.
- 痴漢電車 いやらしい行為 (in Japanese). Japanese Movie Database.
- "痴漢電車 いやらしい行為". Japanese Cinema Database (Agency for Cultural Affairs).

| Preceded by Amazon Garden: Uniform Lesbians and Kindan no Sono: The Seifuku Les (tie) | Pink Grand Prix Silver Prize; 1993 | Succeeded by I Like You, I Like You Very Much |
