= S&M Hunter =

- Theatrical poster
- Directed by: Shuji Kataoka
- Written by: Shuji Kataoka
- Produced by: Daisuke Asakura
- Starring: Shiro Shimomoto; Hiromi Saotome; Yutaka Ikejima; Ayu Kiyokawa
- Cinematography: Toshio Shimura
- Edited by: Shōji Sakai
- Music by: Hiroshi Akutagawa
- Production company: Kokuei
- Distributed by: Shintōhō Eiga (domestic); Troma Entertainment (international)
- Release date: February 1986 (Japan)
- Running time: 59 minutes
- Country: Japan
- Language: Japanese

S&M Hunter (地獄のローパー、緊縛・SM・18才(SMクレーン、宙吊り), Kinbaku · SM · 18-sai; lit. SM kurên chûzuri) is a 1986 comedy pink film directed by Shuji Kataoka and starring Shiro Shimomoto, Hiromi Saotome and Yutaka Ikejima.

== Synopsis ==
S&M Hunter (Japanese: 地獄のローパー Jigoku no Rōpā) is a super genius nawashi whose specialty is tying up women in order to tame them. When the sukeban gang The Bombers kidnap a man to use as their personal sex slave, his boyfriend asks S&M Hunter for help. S&M Hunter accepts the mission to defeat the gang.

== Cast ==
- Shiro Shimomoto: S&M Hunter
- Hiromi Saotome: Meg
- Yutaka Ikejima: Dungeon Master
- Ayu Kiyokawa: Machiko (Machi in the US release)
- Bunmei Tobayama: Saeki (Joe in the US release)
- Naomi Sugishita: Maria
- Akira Fukuda: Wataru (Jack in the US release)
- Mie Mogami: gang member
- Utako Sarashina: gang member

== Availability ==
Shuji Kataoka filmed S&M Hunter for Kokuei and it was released theatrically in Japan by Shintōhō Eiga in February 1986. The U.S. premiere was September 2008 in Austin Fantastic Fest. The second appearance of this film in the U.S. is at San Francisco Independent Film Festival. Region 0 DVD by US-based company Pinkeiga has been released since January 14, 2009 in USA. The film is also available as a digital download or streaming file on the Pink Eiga site as of 2012.

== Reviews ==
- Gilvear, Kevin (2009-02-01). "DVD Times - S&M Hunter". DVD Times.
- KamuiX (2009-02-01). "Infini-Tropolis Review: S&M Hunter (1986)". infini-tropolis.com.
- cinesploitation (2008-12-14). "S&M Hunter (1986)". cinesploitation.
- Stadtman, Todd (2009-02-18). "S & M Hunter". Teleport City.
- Kingmob (2009-02-18). "S & M Hunter - Review". (Cool) Shite on the Tube. Archived from the original on 2011-07-23.
- Gigantor (2009-02-02). "S&M Hunter". Cinemania.co.nz. Archived from the original on 2013-02-18.
- Perkins, Rodney (2008-09-27). "BEHIND THE PINK CURTAIN Retrospective: Shuji Kataoka's S&M HUNTER". Twitch. Archived from the original on 2009-02-09.
- Vieillot, Martin. "SM Hunter: Unsung hero" (in French). EigaGoGo!. Archived from the original on 2010-01-25.
