= OP Eiga =

Japanese pink film studio

- Type: Private KK
- Industry: Pornography
- Founded: 1961
- Founder: Mitsuru Ōkura
- Headquarters: Tokyo, Japan
- Products: Pink films
- Parent: OP Licensing Ltd.
- Website: okura-movie.co.jp/op okurapictures.com

OP Eiga (オーピー映画), also known as Ōkura Eiga (大蔵映画) or Okura Pictures, is the largest and one of the oldest independent Japanese studios which produce and distribute pink films. It was founded in 1961 by Mitsuru Ōkura, former president of film studio Shintōhō. Along with Shintōhō Eiga, Kantō, Million Film, and Kōji Wakamatsu's production studio, Ōkura was one of the most influential studios on the pink film genre. Among the many notable pink films released by the studio are Satoru Kobayashi's Flesh Market (1962), the first film in the pink film genre.

== Ōkura Eiga in the 1960s ==
Mitsuru Ōkura was the president of the major film studio, Shintōhō, from 1955 until the studio's bankruptcy in May 1961. He produced numerous films during this time, including Emperor Meiji and the Great Russo-Japanese War (1957), which held the Japanese box office record of 20 million admissions for decades, up until its record was broken by Hayao Miyazaki's Studio Ghibli anime film Spirited Away (2001).

In keeping with his carnival barker roots, Ōkura had moved Shintōhō into exploitation film genres during his time at the studio. Among the genres in which the studio specialized under Ōkura were horror, science-fiction, war, crime and sex films. The same year of Shintōhō's demise, Ōkura founded the Ōkura Eiga studio. Ōkura established his new studio by setting up production in Shintōhō's facilities in Setagaya, Tokyo which he had purchased with his own company. Shintōhō employee Kouichi Gotō bought the studio's Kansai studio as well as the use of the studio name to start up a new enterprise, Shintōhō Eiga. After Ōkura, Shintōhō Eiga is currently the second largest pink film studio.

The early titles produced at Ōkura Eiga indicate that the films from Ōkura's new studio continued the themes pioneered at Shintōhō. Director Satoru Kobayashi's all-color 1963 film, The Mysterious Pearl of the Ama, for example, looks back to Shintōhō's boundary-pushing female pearl-diver films of the mid-1950s, starring Michiko Maeda and Yōko Mihara. Kobayashi also directed ghost stories in the style of the films of Shintōhō's Nobuo Nakagawa, with titles like Okinawa Hanging Phanton Ghost Story (沖縄怪談逆吊り幽霊, Okinawa Kaidan Sakasazuri Yūrei) (1962), Ghost from the Continent or Ghost Story: Phantom Foreigner (怪談異人幽霊) (1963), and Ghost Story: Cruel Phantom (怪談残酷幽霊, Kaidan Zankoku Yūrei) (1964). Kobayashi continued to occasionally make films in this style for Ōkura as late as 1995 with Erotic Ghost Story: Female Ghost in Heat or Lusty Ghost Story: Rutting Woman Phantom (色欲怪談 発情女ゆうれい, Shikiyoku Kaidan: Hatsujō Onna Yūrei) starring actresses Nao Saejima and Yumi Yoshiyuki, who would become a prominent pink film director herself, releasing mainly through Ōkura.

Kobayashi had worked with Ōkura at Shintōhō since 1954 and came with him to the new studio. Kobayashi's name in the history of cinema was ensured when he directed the first pink film, Flesh Market, in 1962 at Ōkura Eiga. When the police confiscated the film, two days after its release, the studio quickly patched together another version from extra footage, and Flesh Market became a huge success.

The assistant director on Flesh Market, Kin'ya Ogawa who had come from an old Kabuki family, was one of Ōkura's most important directors during the 1960s. One of Ōkura's most experienced and prolific directors, he made his directorial debut in May 1965 with Mistress (妾, Mekake) for Kokuei studio. This was the first film in the "Part color" format in which key scenes—usually sex scenes—were shot in color while the rest of the film was in monochrome. Most of Ogawa's output during the 1960s was released through Ōkura. Though Ōkura had established the pink film genre—called "eroductions" until the late 1960s—with the release of Kobayashi's Flesh Market in 1962, Ōkura would not devote its resources entirely to pink until after the failure of Kiyoshi Komori's big-budget war epic, The Pacific War and the Star Lily Corps (太平洋戦争と姫ゆり部隊, Taiheiyousensou to Himeyuri Butai) (1962), and the tremendous success of Ogawa's Female, Female, Female (雌・メス・牝, Mesu Mesu Mesu) (January 1965).

At Ōkura, Ogawa initiated one of the most popular themes in pink film, the "urban paranoia" story. His trilogy of films beginning with Conception and Venereal Disease (1968) was an example of this genre, in which an innocent country girl is corrupted by life in the big city. Ogawa also directed "pink kaidan" or erotic ghost stories for Ōkura, and it is with these titles for which he is best remembered. Ōkura was involved in the international distribution system involving softcore pornographic films beginning in the mid-1960s. A 1969 report from Kinema Jumpo indicated that some of Ogawa's films for Ōkura, including 1966-06 Desires of an Abnormal Man (欲望の異常者, Yokubō no Ijōsha) (June 1966) and College Coed's Forbidden Flower Garden (女子大生の禁じられた花園, Joshidaisei no Kinjirareta Hanazono) (September 1967) had been exported and shown in England. Ogawa claims that his favorite of his films is Lustful Room in an Apartment (好色マンション(秘) 室, Kōshoku Mansion-Shitsu) (November 1968), but most critics name Research into a True Virgin a.k.a. Search for a True Virgin (純処女しらべ, Jun Shojo Shirabe) (June 1968) as his best film. Both films were made for Ōkura. Ogawa stayed with Ōkura for six years, joining Million Film in 1970 and later working at Shintōhō Eiga and Nikkatsu.

To help fill the double- or triple-bill programs in his own theatres, Ōkura imported yō-pin or "Western pink" into Japan. These were softcore sexploitation films of the type that were shown in western grindhouses and drive-ins. Ōkura also claims to have produced the first pink film directed by a woman. Kyōko Ōgimachi, an actress in Shintōhō's ama films of the 1950s, directed Yakuza Geisha in 1965. However Jasper Sharp reports that several pink film insiders are skeptical of this claim, as Ōgimachi was Mitsugu Ōkura's mistress, and he was known to treat her with favoritism.

The Weissers write that standard Ōkura Eiga product of the 1960s was a low-budget affair with a forgettable plot which existed only to provide actresses to appear in the nude. One of Ōkura's most popular actresses in their late 1960s output was the shapely Mari Iwai. Iwai was especially known for her roles in coming of age films. Pink film queen Noriko Tatsumi appeared in films for Ōkura, including Love's Milky Drops a.k.a. Amorous Liquid (多情な乳液, Tajōna Nyūeki) (December 1967), made between the shooting on Atsushi Yamatoya's cult pink film, Inflatable Sex Doll of the Wastelands. After her career got off to a bad start with cult horror director Kinnosuke Fukada's disastrous foray into pink, Pleasure Trap (Kairaku no Wana, Kokuei, early 1967), actress Keiko Kayama took the unusual step for the time of initiating a publicity campaign. Following this successful move, she became one of the leading sex film actresses of the era, starring in such box-office hits for Ōkura as Pleasure of Women (女のよろこび, Onna no Yorokobi) (April 1967). Ōkura gave future "SM Queen", actress Naomi Tani her first taste of the SM genre in Memoirs of a Modern Female Doctor a.k.a. Contemporary Medical Science on Women and Two Stories Of Sex (現代女性医学, Gendai Joi Igaku) (May 1967), and her first role in a fully SM-themed film with Cruel Map of Women's Bodies a.k.a. Female Bodies in a Brutal Scenario (女体残虐図, Jotai Zangyakuzu) (October, 1967).

== Ōkura and OP Eiga in the 1970s and 1980s ==
By the time the major studio, Nikkatsu took over the sexploitation genre in the early 1970s with its Roman Porno films, a distribution system for independent pink films had been established, with Ōkura and Shintōhō Eiga controlling most of the venues. Ōkura's production arm was eventually named OP Eiga, while the distribution retained the Ōkura name. Typical of the studio's output in the 1980s, director Kazuhisa Ogawa, with regular star Mayumi Sanjo specialized in a series of college girl films. This series had Ogawa seeking revenge for rape, but, unlike typical rape and revenge films, the first offense was not entirely unwelcomed, and the resulting revenge tends to be light-weight acts of humiliation.

Rape Pornography (犯しの淫画, Okashi No Inga) (February 1983) and Spoiled Relationship (熟れすぎた関係, Uresugita Kankei) (August 1983) were unusually artistically done, thought-provoking films by regular Ōkura director Dai Iizumi. The Weissers write that Jō Ichimura's 1991 film Lost Female Body (失われた女体, Ushinawareta Nyotai) is a "revolutionary" pink film which has acquired a cult following in the years since its initial release.

Along with the exclusively gay-themed ENK studio, OP Eiga is one of very few studios to regularly produce gay pink film, such as Kuninori Yamazaki's award-winning That's When Things Changed (そして、僕らは変った, Soshite Bokura wa Kawatta) (October 1993). A former journalist, That's When Things Changed was Yamazaki's directorial debut. Praised by critics for its intellectual themes, it was not as heartily embraced by regular pink film audiences. Openly gay actor-screenwriter Kouichi Imaizumi has become a key figure in the emergence of gay pink film by writing several scripts directed by Yumi Yoshiyuki for OP Eiga which help to bring a more realism to gay-themed pink films.

== OP Eiga today ==
OP Eiga has not attempted to foster a "movement" such as the "Four Heavenly Kings of Pink" (ピンク四天王, pinku shitenno) or "Seven Lucky Gods of Pink" (ピンク七福神, shichifukujin), though, at the beginning of the 21st century, four major pink film directors are associated with the company: Yutaka Ikejima, Yumi Yoshiyuki, Minoru Kunizawa, and Tarō Araki. Neither has OP Eiga attempted to court overseas audiences, though Jasper Sharp asserts that OP Eiga's films would be popular with foreign audiences. Nevertheless, OP Eiga continues to be a major force in the pink film genre, both because of its prolific output, and because its films are consistently named among the "Best Ten" of the year at the annual Pink Grand Prix. At the 2007 ceremony covering the year 2006, for example. all three top films were from OP Eiga. Best Films of the year produced by OP Eiga include Sad and Painful Search: Office Lady Essay (Tarō Araki, 2000), A Saloon Wet with Beautiful Women (Tatsuro Kashihara, 2002), Fascinating Young Hostess: Sexy Thighs (Tetsuya Takehora, 2006), Molester's Train: Sensitive Fingers (Yoshikazu Katō, 2007), and the most recent Best Film, director Yoshikazu Katō's Tsubo Hime Sopu: Nuru Hada de Urazeme (壺姫ソープ ぬる肌で裏責め) (2009). In recognition of its place in the pink film genre, the studio itself was given a special award in 1996.

== Personnel and output ==
=== Directors ===
Notable directors whose films have been produced or released by Ōkura Eiga / OP Eiga include:

- Tarō Araki
- Yutaka Ikejima
- Tatsuro Kashihara
- Yoshikazu Katō

- Minoru Kunizawa
- Shigeo Moriyama
- Kin'ya Ogawa
- Genji Shibahara

- Tetsuya Takehora
- Kuninori Yamazaki
- Naoyuki Tomomatsu
- Yumi Yoshiyuki

=== Actors and actresses ===
Notable actors and actresses who have performed at Ōkura Eiga / OP Eiga include:

- Taro Araki
- Mayu Asada
- Asami
- Lemon Hanazawa
- Miki Hayashi
- Yumika Hayashi
- Hotaru Hazuki
- Yuria Hidaka
- Yutaka Ikejima

- Mari Iwai
- Sakurako Kaoru
- Tamaki Katori
- Keiko Kayama
- Kyōko Kazama
- Riri Kōda
- Kyōko Natsume
- Mayuko Sasaki

- Motoko Sasaki
- Yumeka Sasaki
- Yōko Satomi
- Naomi Tani
- Maki Tomoda
- Koharu Yamazaki
- Yumi Yoshiyuki
- Akiho Yoshizawa

=== Films ===
Notable films produced and/or released by Ōkura Eiga / OP Eiga include:

- Flesh Market (肉体の市場, Nikutai no Ichiba) (Satoru Kobayashi, 1962)
- Cruel Map of Women's Bodies (女体残虐図, Jotai Zangyakuzu) (Masanao Sakao, 1967)
- The Cursed Pond (Kaibyo Noroi no Numa) (Yoshihiro Isikawa, 1968)
- The Dismembered Ghost (Kaidan barabara yurei) (Kinya Ogawa, 1969)
- Sex Guy's Inn: Women's Wiggling Asses (性奴の宿 うごめく女尻, Seiyatsu no Yado: Ugokumeku Mejiri) (Yutaka Ikejima, 2000)
- Sad and Painful Search: Office Lady Essay (せつなく求めて ＯＬ編, Setsunaku Motomete: OL-hen) (Tarō Araki, 2000)
- Immoral First Love: Loving from the Nipples (初恋不倫 乳首から愛して, Hatsukoifurin: Chikubi kara Aishite) (Tarō Araki, 2001)
- Private Lessons: Home Teacher's Breast (プライベート・レッスン 家庭教師の胸元, Puraibeeto * Ressun: Kateikyōshi no Munamoto) (Minoru Kunizawa, 2001)
- Sister-in-Law's Wet Thighs (義姉さんの濡れた太もも / 義姉さんの濡れた太股, Gishisan no Nureta Futomomo) (Tarō Araki, 2001)
- Delivery Health Girl: The Moisture of Silken Skin (デリヘル嬢 絹肌のうるおい, Deriherujō: Kinuhada no Uruoi) (Yutaka Ikejima, 2002)
- Molester's Bus 2: Heat of the Over Thirty (痴漢バス２ 三十路の火照り, Chikan Basu 2: Misoji no Hoteri) (Tarō Araki, 2002)
- A Saloon Wet with Beautiful Women (美女濡れ酒場, Bijo Nure Sakaba) (Tatsurō Kashihara, 2002)
- Adulterous Wife's Dirty Afternoon (不倫妻の淫らな午後, Furin-zuma no Midara na Gogo) (Yutaka Ikejima, 2003)
- Eighteen Year-Old, Uniform's Breast (十八歳、制服の胸元, Jūhassai, Seifuku no Munamoto) (Minoru Kunizawa, 2003)
- The Girl Next Door: Taste of Short Steps (隣のお姉さん 小股の斬れ味, Tonari no Onesan: Komata no Kireaji) (Tarō Araki, 2003)
- Irresistable Angel: Suck It All Up (悩殺天使 吸い尽くして, Nōsatsu Tenshi: Sūi Tsukushite) (Minoru Kunizawa, 2003)
- Aspiring Home Tutor: Soiled Pure Whiteness (憧れの家庭教師 汚された純白, Akogare no Kateikyoshi: Yogosareta Junbaku) (Yumi Yoshiyuki, 2004)
- Housekeeper with Beautiful Skin: Made Wet with Finger Torture (美肌家政婦 指責め濡らして, Mihada Kaseifu: Yubizeme Nurashite) (Tarō Araki, 2004)
- Picture Book of a Beautiful Young Girl: Soaked Uniform (美少女図鑑 汚された制服, Bishojo Zukan: Abusareta Seifuku) (Tetsuya Takehora, 2004)
- Widow * Second Wife: Real Sucking Engulfing a Rare Utensil (後家・後妻 生しゃぶ名器めぐり, Goke * Gozai: Seishaburi Meikimeguri) (Shigeo Moriyama, 2004)
- Wife Taxi: Crowded with Big Tits (人妻タクシー 巨乳に乗り込め, Hitozuma Takushii: Kyonyū ni Norikomu) (Yutaka Ikejima, 2004)
- Lustful Wife in Black: Aching (欲情喪服妻 うずく, Yokujō Mofukutsuma: Uzuku) (Minoru Kunizawa, 2005)
- Lustful Hitchhiker: Sought Wife (欲情ヒッチハイク 求めた人妻, Yokujo Hitchihaiku: Motometa Hitozuma) (Tetsuya Takehora, 2005)
- Miss Peach: Peachy Sweetness Huge Breasts (ミスピーチ 巨乳は桃の甘み, Misu Piichi: Kyonyū wa Momo no Umami) (Yumi Yoshiyuki, 2005)
- Older Office Lady: Using Her Seductive Tongue (年上のＯＬ 悩ましい舌使い, Toshiue no OL: Nayamashii Shita Tsukai) (Yumi Yoshiyuki, 2005)
- Miss Hotel Call Girl: Healing Induction (ホテトル嬢 癒しの手ほどき, Hoterujō Iyashi no Te Hodoki) (Tetsuya Takehora, 2006)
- Big Tit Sisters: Blow Through the Valley (巨乳な姉妹 ～谷間に吸いつけ～, Kyonyū na Shimai * Tanima ni Fuitsuke) (Yumi Yoshiyuki, 2006)
- Hostess Madness: Unparched Nectar (ホスト狂い 渇かない蜜汁, Hosuto Kurui: Wawakanai Mitsu-Jiru) (Yutaka Ikejima, 2006)
- Fascinating Young Hostess: Sexy Thighs (悩殺若女将 色っぽい腰つき, Nōsatsu Waka Okami: Iroppoi Koshitsuki) (Tetsuya Takehora, 2006)
- Shōwa Erotic Romance: The Virgin's Bashfulness (昭和エロ浪漫 生娘の恥じらい, Shōwa Ero Roman: Kimusume no Hajirai) (Yutaka Ikejima, 2006)
- Company President's Secretary: Hunting Big Tit Sexual Harassment (社長秘書 巨乳セクハラ狩り, Shachō Hisho: Kyonyū Sekuharakari) (Kuninori Yamazaki, 2007)
- Fascinating Woman: The Temptation of Creampie (奪う女 中出しの誘惑, Ubau Onna: Nakadashi no Yūwaku) (Yutaka Ikejima, 2007)
- Lewd Priest: Playful Writing on a Woman's Body (ワイセツ和尚 女体筆いじり, Waisetsu Oshō: Nyotai Fudeijiri) (Shigeo Moriyama, 2007)
- Widow Apartment: Big Tits' Aching Night (未亡人アパート 巨乳のうずく夜, Mibōjin Apaato: Kyonyū no Uzuku Yoru) (Yumi Yoshiyuki, 2007)
- Molester's Train: Sensitive Fingers (痴漢電車 びんかん指先案内人, Chikan Densha: Binkan Yubi Saki Annai Nin) (Yoshikazu Katō, 2007)
- Adultery Addiction: Sensual Daze (不倫中毒 官能のまどろみ, Furinchūdoku: Kannō no Madoromi) (Yumi Yoshiyuki, 2007)
- The Sticky Taste of a Peach-Skinned Proprietess (桃肌女将のねばり味, Momo Hada Okami no Nebari Aji) (Tetsuya Takehora, 2007)
- Impure Uniform: Writhing Thighs (不純な制服 悶えた太もも, Fujunna Seifuku: Modaeta Futomomo) (Tetsuya Takehora, 2008)
- Best Friend's Wife: The Black Panties of a Secret Rendezvous (親友の妻 密会の黒下着, Shinyū no Tsuma: Mikkai no Kuroshitagi) (Yutaka Ikejima, 2008)
- Female Prisoner Ayaka: Tormenting and Breaking in a Bitch (女囚アヤカ いたぶり牝調教, Joshū Ayaka: Itaburi Mesu Chōkyō) (Naoyuki Tomomatsu, 2008)
- Cousin White Paper: Aching Mature Lewdness (いとこ白書 うずく淫乱熟, Itoko Hakusho: Uzuku Inran Netsu) (Tetsuya Takehora, 2009)

== Bibliography ==
=== English ===
- Cowie, Peter, ed. (1977). "Japan". World Filmography 1967. London: Tantivy Press. ISBN 0-498-01565-3.
- Cowie, Peter, ed. (1977). "Japan". World Filmography 1968. London: Tantivy Press. ISBN 0-904208-36-2.
- Sharp, Jasper (2008). Behind the Pink Curtain: The Complete History of Japanese Sex Cinema. Guildford: FAB Press. ISBN 978-1-903254-54-7.
- Weisser, Thomas; Yuko Mihara Weisser (1998). Japanese Cinema Encyclopedia: The Sex Films. Miami: Vital Books : Asian Cult Cinema Publications. ISBN 1-889288-52-7.

=== Japanese ===
- "Japanese Cinema Database" (in Japanese). Agency for Cultural Affairs. Archived from the original on 2009-12-01.
- "Japanese Movie Database" (in Japanese). Japanese Movie Database.
