= Sexy Battle Girls =

- official box art
- Directed by: Mototsugu Watanabe
- Written by: Masumi Hirayanagi
- Produced by: Ryu Inou
- Starring: Kyōko Hashimoto; Yukijiro Hotaru; Yutaka Ikejima
- Cinematography: Kazuto Kuramoto
- Edited by: Shōji Sakai
- Production company: Nihon Cinema
- Distributed by: Shintōhō Eiga (Japan); Pink Eiga Inc. (US)
- Release dates: June 1986 (Japan); February 23, 2009 (on DVD US)
- Running time: 60 minutes
- Country: Japan
- Language: Japanese

Sexy Battle Girls (狙われた学園、制服を襲う, Nerawareta gakuen: seifuku o osou) AKA Target Campus: Attack the Uniform is a Japanese Pink film directed by Mototsugu Watanabe and starring Kyōko Hashimoto, Hotaru Yukijiro, and Yutaka Ikejima. It was released in Japan in June 1986. The film first appeared in the United States as Sexy Battle Girls at the San Francisco Independent film festival on February 14, 2009. It was released on DVD in the United States on February 23, 2009.

== Plot ==
When a high school girl, Mirai (Kyōko Hashimoto), gets transferred to a private school she finds that the evil headmaster (Yukijiro Hotaru) is selling the girls in the school to local politicians for sex. The headmaster is also the person who humiliated her father (Yutaka Ikejima). Mirai vows revenge and uses her body and her special ability, the "Venus Crush", as a weapon to avenge her family.

== Cast ==
- Kyōko Hashimoto as Mirai Asamiya
- Yukijiro Hotaru as headmaster Bush
- Yutaka Ikejima as Ken Asamiya
- Ayumi Taguchi as Susan Arashiyama
- Ayu Kiyokawa
- Saeko Fuji
- Reika Kazami

== Production ==
Sexy Battle Girls was a spoof on Sukeban Deka, the popular manga and television series from the mid-1980s. In this film, the heroine wields a kendama instead of a yo-yo as in the original series.

== Reviews ==
- B, Mikey (2009-02-27). "Sexy Battle Girls (1986) - DVD Review". screamindemon.com. Archived from the original on May 24, 2009.
- Gilvear, Kevin (2009-02-17). "DVD Times - Sexy Battle Girls". DVD times.
- Perkins, Rodney (2008-11-13). "DVD Review: Mototsugu Watanabe's SEXY BATTLE GIRLS". twitch.net.
- "Sexy Battle Girls (1986 Review)". cinesploitation. 2009-03-01.
- "Infini-Tropolis Review: Sexy Battle Girls (1986)". KamuiX. Infini-Tropolis. 2009-03-08.
