= Married Women Who Want a Taste =

- Theatrical poster for Married Women Who Want a Taste (2003)
- Directed by: Hideo Jōjō
- Written by: Hideo Jōjō
- Produced by: Hideo Jōjō
- Starring: Kaori
- Cinematography: Takuya Hasegawa
- Edited by: Shōji Sakai
- Music by: Takayoshi Tarui
- Distributed by: Iizumi Productions; Xces
- Release date: March 7, 2003
- Running time: 60 min.
- Country: Japan
- Language: Japanese

Married Women Who Want a Taste (味見したい人妻たち, Ajimishitai Hitozumatachi) is a 2003 Japanese pink film directed by Hideo Jōjō. It won the Bronze Prize at the 2003 Pink Grand Prix ceremony.

== Cast ==
- Kaori: Machiko Michikawa
- Ruri Tachibana (橋瑠璃): Yoshiko
- Asami Sakura (佐倉麻美): Yumiko
- Katsumasa Shirato (白土勝功): Hitoshi Yunoki
- Ken'ichi Tajima (田嶋謙一): Haruki Michikawa
- Samon Sakeyama (サーモン鮭山): Mitsuo
- Daisuke Iijima (飯島大介): Doctor

== Synopsis ==
The film is in a surreal style. The story involves a young high school teacher who has retired for marriage and seduces one of her former students. She prolongs the relationship by seeing the student whenever her husband leaves for work. Eventually she hides the student in a bedroom closet for more convenient access.

== Background ==
Married Women Who Want a Taste was Hideo Jōjō's directorial debut, and he was given the Best New Director award at the Pink Grand Prix for his work. Lead actress Kaori had studied classical ballet in Paris. After returning to Japan she modeled and appeared in short films. Married Women Who Want a Taste was her debut role for Xces.

== Critical appraisal ==
Jasper Sharp calls Married Women Who Want a Taste an exceptional release from Xces, one of the critically lesser-regarded pink film studios. He writes that the chemistry between the two leads helps the film, which, he writes, is "an almost perfect pink film." The Japanese Pink film community also showed their approval of the film by awarding it the Bronze Prize and Best New Director at the Pink Grand Prix. Katsumasa Shirato was also awarded the Best Actor, 2nd place award for his performance.

== Bibliography ==
- Sharp, Jasper (2008). Behind the Pink Curtain: The Complete History of Japanese Sex Cinema. Guildford: FAB Press. pp. 336–337, 347. ISBN 978-1-903254-54-7.
- "味見したい人妻たち". Japanese Cinema Database (Agency for Cultural Affairs).
- 味見したい人妻たち (in Japanese). Japanese Movie Database.
- 味見したい人妻たち (in Japanese). nakamuraeigeki.com. Archived from the original on 2009-11-10.
- 味見したい人妻たち (in Japanese). P.G. Web Site.

Preceded by Office Lady's Sexual Confession: Burning Love Affair	Pink Grand Prix Bronze Prize; 2003	Succeeded by Twitch – You Are My Toy
