= Yoshikazu Katō =

Japanese film director and screenwriter (born 1972)

- Born: 1972 (age 53–54); Kyoto, Japan
- Occupations: Film director Screenwriter
- Years active: 2001–

Yoshikazu Katō (加藤義一, Katō Yoshikazu) is a Japanese film director and screenwriter.

== Life and career ==
Yoshikazu Katō was born in Kyoto in 1972, and became a fan of the pink film while still in junior high school. He graduated from the Nikkatsu Visual Arts Academy in 1993, and began working in the film industry in 1995. He worked as assistant director on nearly 100 pink films beginning with Hisayasu Satō's Hunters' Sense of Touch (狩人たちの触覚, Karyudo-tachi no shokkaku) (1995), for the gay-themed ENK studio. His directorial debut was at Ōkura Pictures (OP Eiga) with Aijin hisho: bijiri mitsumamire (牝監房 汚された人妻), filmed in 2001 and released in 2002. Also at OP Eiga he filmed Molester's Train: Sensitive Fingers (2007) which was given the Best Film award at the Pink Grand Prix and which won Katō the award for Best Director. At the Kansai region Pinky Ribbon Awards the film was also given the top award, the Gold Prize.

== Ninja films ==
Katō directed the V-Cinema ninja-sexploitation series Legend of the Voluptuous Kunoichi (妖艶くノ一伝, Yōen Kunoichi Den) in 2006 and 2007. The films featured AV idols as Kunoichi protagonists and were later released in the United States by Switchblade Pictures.

- Twin Blades of the Ninja (Risa Kouda)
- Ninjaken: The Naked Sword (Kaede Matsushima)
- Ninja She-Devil (Yuma Asami)
- I Was a Teenage Ninja (Saki Ninomiya)

== Award-winning films ==
=== "Ten Best" films, Pink Grand Prix ===
- 2007 1st place: Molester's Train: Sensitive Fingers (痴漢電車 びんかん指先案内人, Chikan densha: binkan yubi saki annai nin)

=== Pinky Ribbon Awards ===
- 2007 Gold Prize: Molester's Train: Sensitive Fingers (痴漢電車 びんかん指先案内人, Chikan densha: binkan yubi saki annai nin)

== Bibliography ==
- 加藤義一 かとう・よしかず (in Japanese). allcinema.net.
- 加藤義一 (in Japanese). Japanese Movie Database.
- "Variety Japan" 加藤義一 (in Japanese). Variety Japan. Archived from the original on 2009-06-30.
- "Yoshikazu Katō Interview" (in Japanese). intro.ne.jp: Creators Movie Magazine.

Awards and achievements
Pink Grand Prix
Preceded by Yutaka Ikejima for Hostess Madness: Unparched Nectar	Pink Grand Prix for Best Director; Yoshikazu Katō; 2007 for Molester's Train: Sensitive Fingers	Succeeded by Yutaka Ikejima for Chō inran: yarebayaruhodo iikimochi
