= Tetsuya Takehora =

Japanese film director

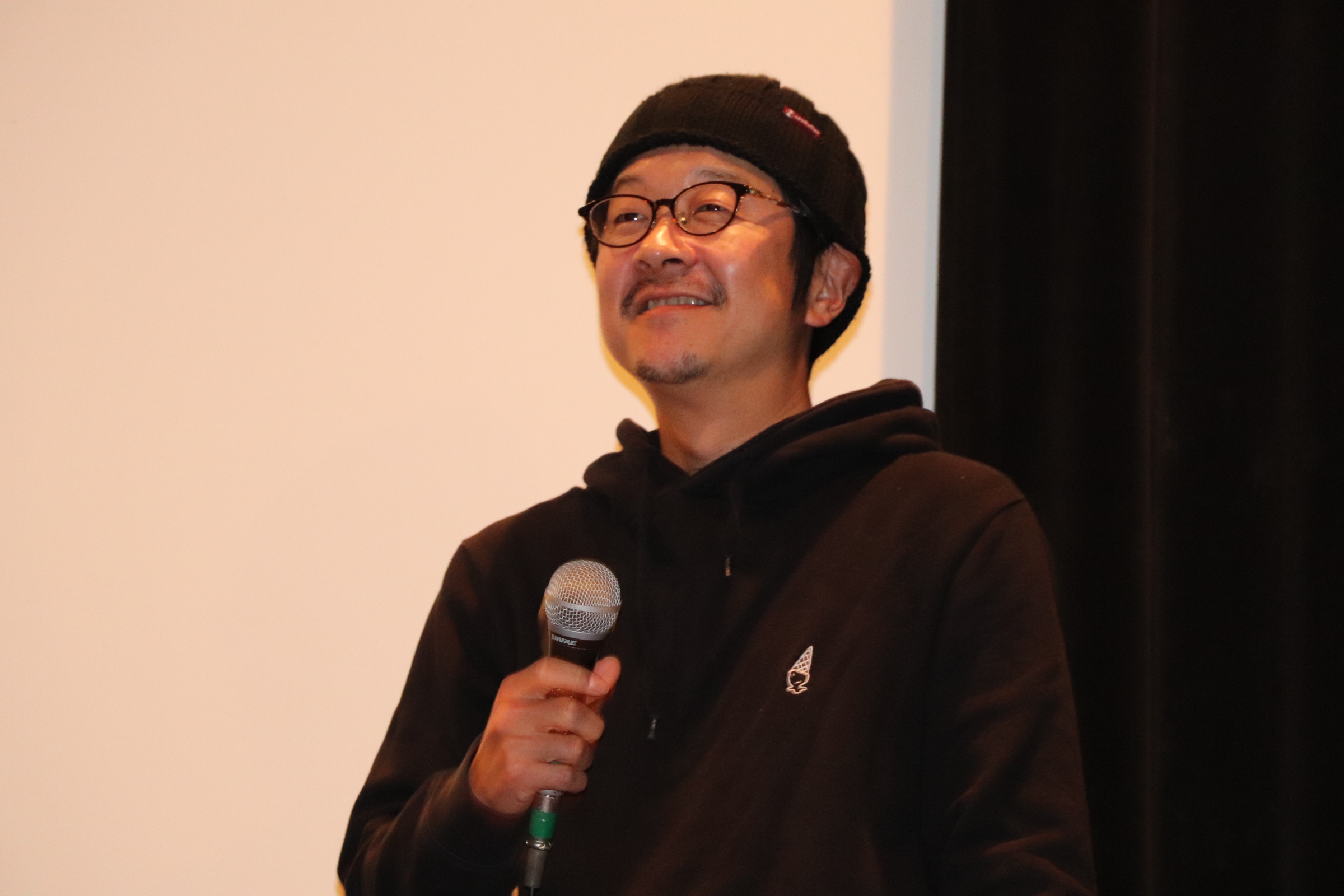
- Tetsuya Takehora in 2019
- Born: 1974 (age 51–52); Aomori Prefecture, Japan
- Occupations: Film director; screenwriter
- Years active: 2004–present

Tetsuya Takehora (竹洞哲也, Takehora Tetsuya) is a Japanese film director and screenwriter.

== Life and career ==
Tetsuya Takehora studied at the Japan Academy of Moving Images (日本映画学校), founded by director Shōhei Imamura in 1975 as the Yokohama Vocational School of Broadcast and Film. He entered the film industry as an assistant director at Ōkura Pictures (OP Eiga), in which capacity he worked for five years. He made his directorial debut with Peep Show (人妻の秘密 覗き覗かれ) (2004), and won the Best New Director award at the Pink Grand Prix the same year for Picture Book of a Beautiful Young Girl: Soaked Uniform (美少女図鑑 汚された制服, Bishōjozukan: abusareta seifuku). Takehora's films are generally in a light, erotic-comic vein, and have proven popular with pink film audiences and critics. He was given the Best Director title the following year for Lustful Hitchhiker: Sought Wife (2005), and a four-film career retrospective show at the third annual R18 Love Cinema Showcase held at Tokyo's Theatre PolePole Higashi-Nakano in 2006.

== Award-winning films ==
=== "Ten Best" films, Pink Grand Prix ===
- 2004 9th place: Picture Book of a Beautiful Young Girl: Soaked Uniform (美少女図鑑 汚された制服, Bishōjozukan: abusareta seifuku)
- 2005 4th place: Lustful Hitchhiker: Sought Wife (欲情ヒッチハイク 求めた人妻, Yokujō hitchihaiku: motometa hitozuma)
- 2005 Honorable Mention: 援交性態ルポ 乱れた性欲
- 2006 1st place: Fascinating Young Hostess: Sexy Thighs (悩殺若女将 色っぽい腰つき, Nōsatsu waka-okami: iroppoi koshitsuki)
- 2006 2nd place: Miss Hotel Call Girl: Healing Induction (ホテトル嬢 癒しの手ほどき, Hoterujō iyashi no te hodoki)
- 2007 9th place (tie): The Sticky Taste of a Peach-Skinned Proprietess (桃肌女将のねばり味, Momo hada okami no nebari aji)
- 2008 3rd place: Impure Uniform: Writhing Thighs (不純な制服 悶えた太もも, Fujunna Seifuku: Modaeta Futomomo)
- 2008 9th place: Molester's Train: Melody of Wriggling Fingers (痴漢電車 うごめく指のメロディ, Chikan Densha: Ugomeku Yubi no Merodi)
- 2009 8th place: Cousin White Paper: Aching Mature Lewdness (いとこ白書 うずく淫乱熱, Itoko Hakusho: Uzuku Inran Netsu)

=== Pinky Ribbon Awards ===
- 2006 Gold Prize: Fascinating Young Hostess: Sexy Thighs (悩殺若女将 色っぽい腰つき, Nōsatsu waka-okami: iroppoi koshitsuki)

== Bibliography ==
=== English ===
- Sharp, Jasper (2008). Behind the Pink Curtain: The Complete History of Japanese Sex Cinema. Guildford: FAB Press. pp. 331–332, 362. ISBN 978-1-903254-54-7.

=== Japanese ===
- 竹洞哲也 たけほら・てつや (in Japanese). allcinema.net.
- 竹洞哲也 (in Japanese). Japanese Movie Database.
- "Variety Japan" 竹洞哲也 （ヤケホラテツヤ） (in Japanese). Variety Japan.
- 竹洞哲也（監督）×小松公典（脚本）×サーモン鮭山 (in Japanese). intro.ne.jp (Creators Movie Magazine).

Awards and achievements
Pink Grand Prix
Preceded by Hideo Jojo for Wives Who Want to Try	Pink Grand Prix for Best New Director; Tetsuya Takehora; 2004 for Picture Book of a Beautiful Young Girl: Soaked Uniform	Succeeded by Yasufumi Tanaka for Three Naked Sisters: Lewdness
Preceded by Shinji Imaoka for Lunch Box	Pink Grand Prix for Best Director; Tetsuya Takehora; 2005 for Lustful Hitchhiker: Sought Wife	Succeeded by Yutaka Ikejima for Hostess Madness: Unparched Nectar
