= Emi Kuroda =

Japanese adult video and pink film actress

- 黒田エミ
- Born: 1978 (age 47–48); Hirakata, Osaka, Japan

Emi Kuroda (Japanese: 黒田エミ, Hepburn: Kuroda Emi) a.k.a. Misuzu Akimoto (秋元美鈴, Akimoto Misuzu) is a Japanese pink film actress who was born in Osaka in 1978. She is best known for playing the title role in director Mitsuru Meike's The Glamorous Life of Sachiko Hanai (2003).

== Film career ==
Emi Kuroda started her AV career in 2000 under the name Misuzu Akimoto. Often playing high school girl roles, she starred in such films as Virtual Sexpot and several volumes of Paradise of Japan With no previous theatrical acting experience, Kuroda was chosen to star in director Mitsuru Meike's 2003 pink film, The Glamorous Life of Sachiko Hanai. The film gained a cult following and became a surprise international hit, playing at 20 film festivals and having a theatrical release in the U.S. in 2006. As part of the film's tour of international film festivals, Kuroda was invited to speak at the PIA Film Festival in July 2005. One reviewer commented that the film was boosted by "Emi Kuroda's skilled erotic contortions (as well as by her ability to rattle off her pseudo-intellectual dialogue as though she understands it)."

== Martial arts career ==
It was Takao Nakano (who also wrote the screenplay for Sachiko Hanai) who introduced Kuroda to cat-fights, and she joined his cat-fight club "Galshocker" under the name "Rolling Thunder". She left her screen and video work to start up a career as a martial arts fighter. Her record for the 2005 season was one win and three losses. In her martial arts career, she attained third-ranking amateur Shoot Boxing Bantamweight.
