= Lesbian Harem =

- Theatrical poster for Lesbian Harem (1987)
- Directed by: Tomoaki Hosoyama
- Written by: Miku Akiyama; Tomoaki Hosoyama
- Starring: Reika Kano; Yuriko Kyōtoku
- Cinematography: Yōichi Shiga
- Edited by: Naoki Kaneko
- Production company: Shintōhō Eiga
- Distributed by: Shintōhō Eiga
- Release date: April 18, 1987
- Running time: 63 minutes
- Country: Japan
- Language: Japanese

Lesbian Harem (レスビアンハーレム) is a 1987 Japanese pink film directed by Tomoaki Hosoyama.

== Synopsis ==
Two lesbian lovers (Reika Kano and Kyōko Hashimoto) escape the city to commit a lovers-suicide deep in the forest. There they are captured by the queen (Chiemi Akimoto) of a lesbian colony who uses the two lovers for her own sex games. The couple organizes a revolt against the queen.

== Cast ==
- Reika Kano (叶麗華) as Iori
- Yuriko Kyōtoku (京徳ゆりこ) as Yui
- Kumi Uesugi (上杉久美) as M.P.
- Noriko Kikuchi (菊池のり子) as Michiko
- Kyōko Hashimoto (橋本杏子) as An
- Chiemi Akimoto (秋本ちえみ) as Queen
- Itsumi Shikata (志方いつみ) as Shima
- Mirai Akiyama (秋山未来) as Lady-in-Waiting
- Tomomi Matsuda (松田知美) as M.P.

== Background ==
Tomoaki Hosoyama filmed Lesbian Harem for Shintōhō Eiga and it was released theatrically in Japan by that studio on April 18, 1987. U.S. low-budget exploitation films had become popular in Japan with the advent of home video. Director Hosoyama made Lesbian Harem on a similarly low budget, and designed the film as a tribute to these films, and particularly as an homage to John Waters' Desperate Living (1977).

In their Japanese Cinema Encyclopedia: The Sex Films, Thomas and Yuko Mihara Weisser give Lesbian Harem three out of four stars. Noting that Lesbian Harem is an important film on its own, they point out that in many ways this early Hosoyama film also anticipates his later hit, Weather Girl (1993). Hosoyama's attitude towards lesbianism, in particular, is shared between these films, and in direct opposition to the way it was depicted in most contemporary pink films dealing with the subject. Rather than showing lesbians as women who are bitter from bad experiences with heterosexual affairs, and who are victims of a disapproving society, Hosoyama shows lesbianism simply as a lifestyle which the storyline accepts without judgment.

== Bibliography ==
=== English ===
- Lesbian Harem at IMDb
- "LESBIAN HAREM". Complete Index to World Film.
- Weisser, Thomas; Yuko Mihara Weisser (1998). Japanese Cinema Encyclopedia: The Sex Films. Miami: Vital Books : Asian Cult Cinema Publications. p. 241. ISBN 1-889288-52-7.

=== Japanese ===
- レズビアンハーレム (in Japanese). Japanese Movie Database.
- レズビアンハーレム (in Japanese). Xcity.
