= Hiromi Saotome =

Japanese performer and writer (born 1963)

Hiromi Saotome (早乙女 宏美, Saotome Hiromi; born June 20, 1963) is a Japanese actress, writer, stripper, S&M performer, narrator, and said to be Japan's only seppuku performance artist. Now based in Sapporo, she worked in Tokyo from 1980 to 2014. Saotome is well-versed in Japan's underground culture and has written extensively on the subject.

== Style ==
Saotome's strip shows are staged as one-woman plays; she performs scenes of self-bondage and seppuku that follow a storyline. Her performances are full-scale, and Saotome learns dances and selects music for each new one. She never reveals her private parts. Her repertoire includes plays based on themes such as Salome, the Sada Abe incident, Mata Hari, Yaoya Oshichi, and the Future Eve.

In small theater performances, Saotome uses ropes for hanging, candles, pulleys, swords for performing seppuku, and fake blood to make her performances seem realistic. Her activities are diverse; she has performed nude shows at school festivals and nursing homes.

Saotome has been participating in the sadism and masochism event Sadistic Circus since 2005, where she regularly performs seppuku shows.

She also works as an aromatherapist.

== Education ==
Saotome studied classical ballet and jazz dance from childhood, and this knowledge is often put to good use in her stage performances.

== Career ==
At the age of 17, Saotome began working at a no-panties cafe in Kabukichō. At the recommendation of a friend she met there, she began modeling nude for magazines and performing masturbation in peep shows. She then began appearing in S&M videos and pink films in tied-up roles.

In 1983, Saotome became a regular at the Roppongi S&M bar, SAMM, and began performing shows. In 1985, she won the Best Supporting Actress award at the 7th Zoom Up Film Festival, a film festival focused on pink films.[9] From 1986, she toured the country as a stripper specializing in S&M shows.

When Saotome was 21, she began writing a series of photo shoot diaries for an S&M magazine. Her on-site reports from the actress's perspective became a hot topic in industry publications, and she began receiving requests from other magazines, which led to her starting work as a writer.

In 1988, Saotome performed upside-down on a pedestrian bridge in the Harajuku pedestrian zone. That same year, she trained under members of Sankai Juku.

In April 1997, she began performing shows three times a week at the SM Pub Theater Bondage in Shinjuku. In October 1999, Saotome performed in a gold powder show at the Funabashi Wakamatsu Theater as part of a project called "50 Years of Unusual Striptease in Japan," produced by the Strip Press Club.

Saotome served as an S&M advisor for the film Flower and Snake starring Aya Sugimoto. It was released by Toei Company on March 13, 2004.

In 2005, she joined the all-female troupe "Benibara-za," which sometimes performs strip shows exclusively for female audiences, where she performed self-bondage and seppuku shows. Two years later, she studied sports aromatherapy and began working as an aromatherapist.

From November 2009 to September 2013, Saotome served as the hostess of the S&M bar "Black Heart" in Ginza. The bar regularly hosted events called "Masochistic Fantasy," which featured SM novel readings, as well as lectures on self-bondage for women only, which she continues to hold regularly even after retiring from her position as hostess.

She has organized and held five "seppuku social gatherings" at the "Fuzoku Shiryokan," a members-only library for S&M-related activities in Tokyo.

In March 2014, she moved to Sapporo and began working there.

== Solo exhibitions ==
- 『銀壮両刃造短刀想(ぎんそうもろはづくりたんとうそう)』(Ginso Morohatsukuri Tanto Sou,) Seppuku Photography Exhibition, Sapporo Bar & Gallery卍, October 16–31, 2019
- Hiromi Saotome's Seppuku Fantasy Exhibition, Shinjuku Fuzoku Museum, September 9, 2012
- Sotaro Solo Exhibition: Hiromi Saotome's Seppuku Photography "Death in Spring," May 22 - June 9, 2014, Cafe Myrtle
