= Yumi Yoshiyuki =

Japanese film director, actress and screenwriter

- Born: August 19, 1965 (age 60); Fukushima, Japan
- Occupations: Actress; Film director Screenwriter
- Years active: 1993 –

Yumi Yoshiyuki (吉行由実 or 吉行由美, Yoshiyuki Yumi) is a Japanese film director, actress, and screenwriter best known for her work in the pink film genre.

== Early life and education ==
Yoshiyuki studied economics at Dokkyo University.

== Career ==
During her studies at Dokkyo University, Yoshiyuki developed a love of film. She debuted as an actress in the pink film genre in 1993 in director Toshiki Satō's Petting Lesbians: Sensitive Zone (ペッティング・レズ 性感帯, Petting lez: seikan-tai). By the time of her directorial debut three years later, she had appeared in over 100 pink productions. Among the prominent pink film directors she has acted for is Satoru Kobayashi, the director of the first pink film, Flesh Market (1962). She appeared in Kobayashi's Erotic Ghost Story: Female Ghost in Heat (色欲怪談 発情女ゆうれい, Shikiyoku Kaidan: Hatsujo Onna Yurei) (1995), starring AV idol, Nao Saejima. The mainstream Yokohama Film Festival awarded Yoshiyuki with the Best Supporting Actress title for her work in director Akio Jissoji's Rampo Edogawa adaptation, The D-Slope Murder Case (D坂の殺人事件, D-Zaka no satsujin jiken).

In 1996 Yoshiyuki directed her first pink film, Chronic Rutting Adultery Wife (まん性発情不倫妻, Mansei hatsujō furin-zuma). At the Pink Grand Prix she was given a Best New Director award for her debut work, as well as the second place for Best Actress. The film was selected as the 10th best pink release of the year. Since then, films directed by Yoshiyuki have often been placed in the top ten. Her talents as a screenwriter were also awarded at the 2004 Pink Grand Prix for the film Housekeeper with Beautiful Skin: Made Wet with Finger Torture (美肌家政婦 指責め濡らして, Mihada Kaseifu: Yubizeme Nurashite).

Anglophone pink film authority Jasper Sharp contrasts Yoshiyuki's style with that of well-known female pink director Sachi Hamano. Calling her directorial style "softer and gentler" than Hamano's, which he characterizes as "lewder, ruder and cruder than most in the genre," he notes that it is easier to detect a feminine sensibility in Yoshiyuki's work. In her films she often depicts the lives of ordinary women in modern Japan. While this is not an unusual theme in the contemporary pink film, Yoshiyuki's work is recognisable for the meticulous and authentic detail the director achieves.

Yoshiyuki's directorial work has also been recognized by non-pink audiences. In 2004, her film Aspiring Home Tutor: Soiled Pure Whiteness (憧れの家庭教師 汚された純白, Akogare no katei kyōshi) was invited to be shown at the Yūbari International Fantastic Film Festival. Her 2006 film, Big Tit Sisters: Blow Through the Valley, under the title Three Rules to be a Witch (魔女になるための３つのルール, Majo ni naru tame no mittsu no rūru), was also invited to be shown at the festival, and Yoshiyuki attended as a guest. Also honored by the pink film community, Big Tit Sisters was chosen as the 7th Best Film at the Pink Grand Prix ceremony, and the Walkerplus film site named it the sixth best pink film of the year. Her 2004 film Just When I Need You Most (せつないかもしれない, Setsunaikamo shirenai), besides winning 5th best pink release at the Pink Grand Prix, was shown at the 13th Lesbian and Gay Film Festival.

== Awards ==
- 1993: Pink Grand Prix Best New Actress
- 1994 Pink Grand Prix: Best Actress, 4th place for 不倫妻 一夜の快楽
- 1995 Pink Grand Prix: Best Actress, 2nd place for (Big Lecher Girl (ドすけべ母娘, Dosukebeoyako)
- 1996 Pink Grand Prix: Best Actress, 2nd place for Chronic Rutting Adultery Wife
- 1996 Pink Grand Prix: Best New Director, 2nd place for Chronic Rutting Adultery Wife
- 1997 Pink Grand Prix Best Director, for Sisters Donburi: No Pulling Out (姉妹どんぶり 抜かずに中で, Shimai donburi: nukazuni nakade)
- 1999 Yokohama Film Festival Best Supporting Actress for The D-Slope Murder Case (D坂の殺人事件, D-Zaka no satsujin jiken) and Daikaijū Tōkyō ni arawaru
- 2004 Pink Grand Prix, Best Screenplay for Housekeeper with Beautiful Skin: Made Wet with Finger Torture (美肌家政婦 指責め濡らして, Mihada kaseifu: yubizemenurashite)

== Partial filmography ==
=== Top-ten films, Pink Grand Prix ===
- 1996 10th place: Chronic Rutting Adultery Wife (まん性発情不倫妻, Mansei Hatsujō Furin-zuma)
- 1998 5th place: Girl in Heat: Thread-Pulling Underwear (発情娘 糸ひき生下着, Hatsujō Musume: Itohiki Seishitagi)
- 1999 4th place: Addicted to Love (僕は恋に夢中, Boku wa Koi ni Muchū)
- 2004 5th place: Just When I Need You Most (せつないかもしれない, Setsunaikamo Shirenai)
- 2004 7th place: Aspiring Home Tutor: Soiled Pure Whiteness (憧れの家庭教師 汚された純白, Akogare no Kateikyōshi: Yogosareta Junbaku)
- 2005 5th place: Miss Peach: Peachy Sweetness Huge Breasts (ミスピーチ 巨乳は桃の甘み, Misu Piichi: kyonyū wa Momo no Umami)
- 2005 6th place: Older Office Lady: Using Her Seductive Tongue (年上のＯＬ 悩ましい舌使い, Toshiue no OL: Nayamashii Shita Tsukai)
- 2006 7th place: Big Tit Sisters: Blow Through the Valley (巨乳な姉妹～谷間に吸いつけ～, Kyonyū na Shimai * Tanima ni Fuitsuke)
- 2007 2nd place: Adultery Addiction: Sensual Daze (不倫中毒 官能のまどろみ, Furinchūdoku: Kannō no Madoromi)
- 2007 Honorable Mention: Widow Apartment: Big Tits' Aching Night (未亡人アパート 巨乳のうずく夜, Mibōjin Apaato: Kyonyū no Uzuku Yoru)

=== Pinky Ribbon Award-winning films ===
- 2004 Pearl Prize: Aspiring Home Tutor: Soiled Pure Whiteness (憧れの家庭教師 汚された純白, Akogare no kateikyōshi: yogosareta junbaku)
- 2005 Gold Prize: Miss Peach: Peachy Sweetness Huge Breasts (ミスピーチ 巨乳は桃の甘み, Misu Piichi: kyonyū wa momo no umami)
- 2007 Silver Prize: Adultery Addiction: Sensual Daze (不倫中毒 官能のまどろみ, Furinchūdoku: kannō no madoromi)

== Bibliography ==
=== English ===
- Yumi Yoshiyuki at IMDb
- "YUMI YOSHIYUKI". Complete Index to World Film.
- Sharp, Jasper (2008). Behind the Pink Curtain: The Complete History of Japanese Sex Cinema. Guildford: FAB Press. pp. 298, 367–368. ISBN 978-1-903254-54-7.

=== Dutch ===
- van Haute, Luk (2002). "Yumi Yoshiyuki (*1965)". Revival van de Japanse film (in Dutch). Amsterdam: Amsterdam University Press. pp. 56–59. ISBN 978-90-5356-592-6.

=== Japanese ===
- "Japanese Cinema Database". Agency for Cultural Affairs. Archived from the original on 2009-12-01.
- 吉行由実 よしゆき・ゆみ (in Japanese). allcinema.net.
- 吉行由実 (in Japanese). Japanese Movie Database.
- 吉行由美 (in Japanese). Japanese Movie Database.
- 吉行由実( 出演／監督／脚本 ) (in Japanese). Kinema Junpo. Archived from the original on 2010-10-12.
- 吉行由美( 出演 ) (in Japanese). Kinema Junpo. Archived from the original on 2010-10-12.
- "Pink Films History" (in Japanese). P.G. Web Site.
- "祝・「ミス・ピーチ」DVD化＆新作がゆうばり映画祭へ！ 吉行由実監督インタビュー (Yumi Yoshiyuki Interview)" (in Japanese). www.walkerplus.com. Archived from the original on 2008-03-23.
- "吉行由実 - Yumi Yoshiyuki" (in Japanese). www.apres.jp. Archived from the original on 2010-10-04.

Awards and achievements
Pink Grand Prix
Preceded by Takahisa Zeze for Upcoming Scenery	Pink Grand Prix for Best Director; Yumi Yoshiyuki; 1997 for Sisters Donburi: No Pulling Out	Succeeded by Yutaka Ikejima for Moon Light Dinner
