= Revenge of the Pearl Queen =

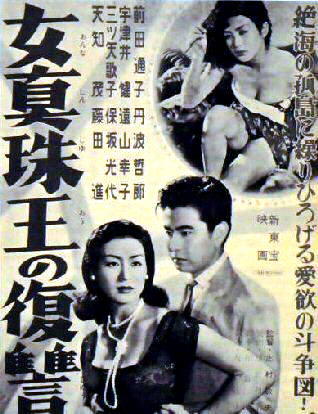
- Directed by: Toshio Shimura
- Written by: Isao Matsumoto, Jun Sagara
- Starring: Michiko Maeda, Ken Utsui
- Cinematography: Tatsuo Tomonari
- Distributed by: Shintōhō
- Release date: July 5, 1956
- Running time: 89 min
- Country: Japan
- Language: Japanese

Revenge of the Pearl Queen (女真珠王の復讐, Ona shinju-ō no fukushū) is a 1956 Japanese thriller film directed by Toshio Shimura and starring Michiko Maeda. This film was one of the earliest Japanese films featuring nudity.

== Plot ==
Yoshio Kizaki is framed for murder and theft by his corrupt boss Kenji Asamura. When Natsuki Kagawa, Kizaki's lover who works for the same boss, discovers the plot on a sea voyage, Asamura throws her overboard. Natsuki is washed up on an island where she is rescued by a group of shipwrecked sailors. Fending off the lecherous sailors, she dives for pearls in the surrounding waters and eventually amasses a fortune which she uses to free her lover from prison.

The plot strongly resembles that of the last film of Josef von Sternberg, the 1953 Saga of Anatahan, which told the reputedly true story of stranded Japanese seamen on an island who murder each other for the favors of the only woman.

== Cast ==
- Michiko Maeda as Natsuki Kagawa/Pearl Queen
- Ken Utsui as Yoshio Kizaki
- Shigeru Amachi as Yuzo Yamauchi
- Saburō Sawai as Ryōhei Ishizuka
- Susumu Fujita as Kenji Asamura

== Production ==
Revenge Of The Pearl Queen was the first of five low budget films produced by the Shintōhō studio featuring Japanese diving girls (ama) although this film had no actual ama in the plot. The following year, Shintōhō released their first genuine ama film, The Girl Diver Trembles in Fear, also directed by Toshio Shimura and starring Michiko Maeda.
