= Shuji Kataoka =

Japanese film director and screenwriter

Shūji Kataoka
- Born: Shūji Kataoka; November 23, 1950 (age 75); Asahikawa, Hokkaido, Japan
- Occupations: Film Director, screenwriter
- Years active: 1983–present

Shūji Kataoka (片岡 修二, Kataoka Shūji) a.k.a. Yasui Shūchi is a Japanese director and screenwriter primarily known for his work in pink films but who has also worked in adult videos (AV) and in mainstream film.

== Life and career ==
Kataoka was born in Hokkaido on November 23, 1950. He studied at the College of Economics at Kanto Gakuin University but dropped out before graduation. In the early 1980s he began to work at producer-director Kan Mukai's Shishi Productions. At first he worked as an assistant director for Mukai and Yōjirō Takita and then released his debut film as a director in 1983, Yokoku Bōkō: Yaru! Sasu!, the first of a series of action films starring Usagi Asō distributed by the Toei Company.

Since then he has made many action pink films, and has gone on to direct mainstream movies and V-Cinema. At the Pink Grand Prix for 1988 Kataoka's Subway Serial Rape: Lover Hunting was awarded Best Film, and Kataoka was given the awards for Best Director and Best Screenplay.

== Partial filmography ==
- Yokoku Bōkō: Yaru! Sasu! (予告暴行 犯る！) (1983)
- S&M Hunter (地獄のローパー、緊縛・SM・18才(SMクレーン、宙吊り), 1986)
- S&M Hunter - Legend of Yakuza (SM倫子のおもらし, 1986)
- S&M Hunter Begins (逆さ吊し縛り縄, 1985)
- Subway Serial Rape Series (「地下鉄連続レイプ」シリーズ, 1985-1988)
  - Subway Serial Rape: Lover Hunting (地下鉄連続レイプ 愛人狩り, 1988)

== Bibliography ==
=== English ===
- Sharp, Jasper (2008). Behind the Pink Curtain: The Complete History of Japanese Sex Cinema. Guildford: FAB Press. pp. 52, 235, 239, 250, 281, 311, 347, 363. ISBN 978-1-903254-54-7.
- "SHUJI KATAOKA". Complete Index to World Film.
- Shûji Kataoka at IMDb
- "Shuji Kataoka". pinkeiga.com. Archived from the original on 2010-02-03.

=== Japanese ===
- 片岡修二 かたおか・しゅうじ (in Japanese). allcinema.net.
- 片岡修二(かたおか しゅうじ) (in Japanese). Directors Guild of Japan. Archived from the original on 2011-07-22.
- 片岡修二 (in Japanese). Japanese Movie Database.
- 片岡修二( 脚本/監督 ) (in Japanese). Kinema Junpo. Archived from the original on 2012-03-09.

Awards and achievements
Pink Grand Prix
Preceded by New Award	Pink Grand Prix for Best Director; Shūji Kataoka; 1988	Succeeded by Masahiro Kasai
