= Motoko Sasaki =

Japanese actress and striptease performer

- Born: February 15, 1967 (age 58); Japan
- Height: 1.58 m (5 ft 2 in)

Motoko Sasaki (佐々木基子, Sasaki Motoko) is a Japanese pink film actress and striptease performer. She entered the pink film profession at the advanced age of 29, became a star in the field at 31, and won a Best Actress award for her work in this genre in 2003 at the age of 36.

== Life and career ==
=== Early life ===
Motoko Sasaki was born on February 15, 1967. She became interested in the stage in middle school, and first began acting in her high school drama club. She had an invitation to pursue the study of acting after graduation from high school, but her father believed that a girl should not attend college. Sasaki wound up working as a civil servant in the same government district as her father. She continued acting in community theater at this time, gaining acting experience in the Shingeki style. She reports that the turning point in her life came when a traveling drama troupe visited her community. The director told her that if she were serious about acting, she would have to learn the basics at training school. She was 22 years of age at the time, and she decided to reject the typical life of marriage and raising children; with 1.5 million yen saved from her salary, she moved to Tokyo to pursue an acting career.

=== Stripping career ===
In Tokyo Sasaki was recruited to perform as a stripper. To cover the cost of living, Sasaki accepted the job. Since she had never seen a strip show, she attended a performance in Ueno. By the end of the performance she had determined to look at the experience as a form of "training school" in dialogue-free body acting. Performing four times a day for a relatively modest 20 million yen a month, Sasaki feels she could have made more money at a hostess bar. But Sasaki stuck with this profession, as it did not require she have physical contact with the audience, and it allowed her to experiment and expand on her craft with each performance. She invested her earnings into her wardrobe and put effort into her interpretations of the songs to which she danced. For three years she studied acting during the day and stripped in the evenings. Recalling the devotion of her fans, including grandfathers who would give her gifts after the show, she remembers this career with fondness.

=== Film career ===
Sasaki made her pink film debut in 1996 at the unusually advanced age of 29. She later joked that since young actresses are not abundant in pink films, she felt confident in her new line of work. Sasaki's first film was Kōshoku joruizukan: oishii hitozuma (好色女類図鑑 美味しい人妻たち), directed by respected pink film veteran actor-director Yutaka Ikejima. Her second film for Ikejima, Beautiful Secretary: Rip Off the Panty Hose (1997), won Sasaki the Best New Actress, Third Place award at the Pink Grand Prix. The film was named fourth best pink release of the year.

Sasaki's acting training and experience has given her versatility in her pink film career, in which she is competent in both serious and comic roles. Her sensual and charming performance style recalls that of the classic Nikkatsu Roman Porno Queens.

Director Sachio Kitazawa's The Horny Widow (1998) was a light erotic film starring Sasaki as the widow of a jeweler, having an affair and suffering at the hands of a rapist and blackmailer. The film became a hit in its video release, bringing Sasaki, then 31, late-comer stardom in the pink profession.

In Nōpan Amadera: Ureta Shigemi (1998) Sasaki actually shaved her head for the role of a teacher who becomes a Buddhist nun.

The main feature of the December 2000 issue of P*G magazine was an interview with Sasaki on the fourth anniversary of her pink film debut. Since 1994 P*G has been the leading journal on the pink film, and is the host of the Pink Grand Prix, the major awards ceremony for the genre. Sasaki won the Best Actress award at the Pink Grand Prix for her performance in Yutaka Ikejima's Adulterous Wife's Dirty Afternoon (2003), which was given the Silver Prize for Best Film at the ceremony.

== Bibliography ==
=== English ===
- Motoko Sasaki at IMDb

=== Japanese ===
- 佐々木基子 ささき・もとこ (in Japanese). allcinema.net.
- "佐々木基子（ささきもとこ） (Profile and filmography)" (in Japanese). www.dmm.co.jp.
- 佐々木基子 (in Japanese). Japanese Movie Database.
- "佐々木基子 (Profile)" (in Japanese). www.videoboy.tv.
- "素顔のピンク女優／寄り道の確信犯 ― 佐々木基子さん" [Bare-Faced Pink Actress]. 記録 (Recording Monthly). September 2000.

Awards and achievements
Pink Grand Prix
Preceded by Koharu Yamasaki for A Saloon Wet with Beautiful Women	Pink Grand Prix for Best Actress; Motoko Sasaki; 2003 for Adulterous Wife's Dirty Afternoon	Succeeded by Yumika Hayashi for Lunch Box
