= Michiko Maeda =

Japanese actress

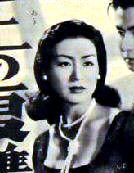
- Michiko Maeda in a movie poster
- Born: February 27, 1934 (age 92); Osaka, Japan

Michiko Maeda (前田通子, Maeda Michiko) is a Japanese film and television actress who became known as the first Japanese actress to appear in a nude scene in a mainstream film.

== Life and career ==
Michiko Maeda was born in Osaka Prefecture on February 27, 1934. She was working in a department store in the Nihonbashi district of Tokyo when she began working as an actress at the Shintoho studio in 1955. Her film debut was in director Hiromasa Nomura's Santōshain to Onna Hisho (三等社員と女秘書), released in August 1955. Maeda's minor role as a striptease dancer in director Seiichiro Uchikawa's Eikō to Bakusō Ō (栄光と驀走王, 1956) brought her to public attention through her voluptuous figure. In their The Japanese Film: Art and Industry, Anderson and Richie described Maeda as "a star who consisted almost entirely of mammary glands."

Shintoho took advantage of Maeda's popularity to cast her in more roles in which she could display her famous figure. Other film studios reportedly engaged in a nationwide search to discover their own buxom models to compete with Maeda. Later in 1956, she was given the starring role in Revenge of the Pearl Queen (女真珠王の復讐, Onna Shinjū Ō no Fukushū), a melodramatic thriller set on an isolated island about a woman seeking revenge for her dead lover. Maeda became notorious for playing the first nude scene in a Japanese film.

For Shintoho, Maeda appeared in string of female pearl-diver films which exploited similar nude scenes, concluding with Woman Diver's Terror (海女の戦慄, Ama no Senritsu) (1957). While acting in the film Konpira Riseiken (金比羅利生剣, 1957) for director Goro Katano, Maeda refused to do a scene in which she was to lift her slip for the camera. The resulting scandal became known as the "Tuck up incident" (裾まくり事件, Suso makuri jiken), and made headlines in international news.

Maeda was invited to appear in two films in Taiwan in 1963. She returned to Japanese media with the 1972 Nippon Television soap opera, Dakuryū no Onna 渓流の女, and appeared on television and on the stage until her retirement in 1976.

After 42 years of exile from the Japanese film world pink film pioneer Satoru Kobayashi and cult film director Teruo Ishii persuaded her to appear in Ishii's 1999 movie Jigoku: Japanese Hell. Maeda played the role of Enma Daio, the Judge of Hell.

== Films ==
- Kuronekokan ni kieta (1956)
- Revenge of the Pearl Queen (1956)
- Hatoba no Ôja (1956)
- Onna keirin-ô (1957)

== Bibliography ==
- "地獄: キャスト (Hell: Cast-- < Enma Daio, the Judge of Hell > Michiko Maeda)" (in Japanese and English). Jigoku Homepage. Archived from the original on 2000-08-19.
- "前田通子 (Maeda Michiko)" (in Japanese). Japanese Movie Database.
- "MICHIKO MAEDA". www.citwf.com.
- Richie, Donald; Joseph Anderson (1982). The Japanese Film: Art and Industry (Expanded ed.). Princeton, New Jersey: Princeton University Press. pp. 266–267.
- "新東宝の女優 (Shintoho Actresses)" (in Japanese).
