= Satoru Kobayashi (director) =

Japanese film director (1930–2001)

- Japanese pink film pioneer, Satoru Kobayashi
- Born: August 1, 1930; Nagano Prefecture, Japan
- Died: November 15, 2001 (aged 71)
- Occupation: Film director
- Years active: 1959–2001

Satoru Kobayashi (小林悟, Kobayashi Satoru) (August 1, 1930 – November 15, 2001) was a Japanese film director most famous for directing the first pink film, the type of softcore pornographic films that became the most prolific film genre in Japan during the 1960s and 1970s. Japanese sources claim that Kobayashi directed over 400 pink films between 1960 and 1990, making him possibly the most prolific Japanese film director.

== Life and career ==
=== Early life ===
Satoru Kobayashi was born in Nagano Prefecture on August 1, 1930. His family owned a hot-spring resort hotel. As a teenager during World War II, Kobayashi was involved in anti-war activities, resulting in his torture by the Japanese military police. In an interview with the Director's Guild, Kobayashi claimed that it was this first-hand experience with torture that gave him his interest and adeptness with the sado-masochistic genre of pink film in which he often worked.

Kobayashi left Nagano for Tokyo, where he studied theater. He became involved with butoh, worked as a set designer, and wrote theatrical criticism while in university. In 1954 he joined Shintoho studios as an assistant director. Here he worked under ero guro masters Teruo Ishii and Hiroshi Shimizu, as well as Kinuyo Tanaka, Japan's first female director. Kobayashi's directorial debut was with the independently produced Crazy Desire (狂った欲望, Kurutta Yokubō) (1959). For Shintoho Kobayashi made ten more films with such exploitable titles as Dangerous Temptation, Three Women Burglars and Phantom Detective: Terrifying Alien (all 1960).

=== Flesh Market ===
When Shintoho declared bankruptcy in 1961, Kobayashi was forced to seek work elsewhere. After a year out of the director's chair, Kobayashi wrote and directed the independent sex-film Flesh Market (1962). Shintoho's female pearl-diver films with actress Michiko Maeda had become notorious in the 1950s as the first Japanese films with nude scenes. Flesh Market was the first Japanese film to show breasts on screen. The film was released on February 27, 1962, and shut down by the Tokyo Metropolitan Police Department the next day. It became the first post-World War II movie to be accused of obscenity. When the film was cleared for release the next year, seven scenes had been cut. Flesh Market was an independent and underground film, and played only in "Adult" theaters. Nevertheless, perhaps because of the controversy surrounding the release of the film, Flesh Market was a box-office success. Made for only 6-8 million yen, the film brought in over 100 million yen, a huge profit for an independent release. The success of this film started the pink film genre, which was to become one of the most vital genres of Japanese domestic cinema for the next 40 years. The star of the film, Tamaki Katori, would go on to appear in over 600 pink films during the 1960s, earning the nickname "The Pink Princess." Today only 21 minutes of Flesh Market survive, preserved in the National Film Centre.

=== Middle career ===
Flesh Market was only the beginning of Satoru Kobayashi's career in pink films. Between 1960 and 1990, he made over 400 such films. His interest in horror also expressed itself in such supernatural thrillers as Okinawa Ghost Story (沖縄怪談, Okinawa kaidan) (1962)– also starring Tamaki Katori– and Caucasian Ghost (怪談異人幽霊, Kaidan Ijin Yūrei) (1963). For Ōkura Eiga (later OP Eiga), the new company of Mitsugu Ōkura, the former president of Shintoho, Kobayashi filmed The Mysterious Pearl of the Ama, a revival of the Michiko Maeda-era pearl-diver films.

Kobayashi made a major miscalculation by attempting to deal with a socially significant theme in Impotence (不能者, Funosha) (1966). According to advertising, the film purported to be "The first film dealing with the modern illness!" Typical of early pink films, the camera-work in Impotence makes careful use of camera angles and props to imply more than is shown. However, as the Weissers point out in their Japanese Cinema Encyclopedia: The Sex Films, the subject of impotence was a poor choice for a pink film. After this box-office failure, Kobayashi quickly moved back to more standard pink film subject-matter.

Disheveled Hair (みだれ髪, Midaregami) (1967) had Kobayashi back in more familiar and successful territory. A story of romance between the girls and guests at a hot spring resort, the film's freshness and freedom was in welcome contrast to Impotent's heavy-handed moodiness. The star of the film, actress Yasuko Matsui, was Kobayashi's wife. She starred in or appeared in many of Kobayashi's films of the 1960s. The popularity of this film inspired the studio– Mutsukuni Eiga– to make a quick sequel. However this second film departed from the original's story, lacked director Kobayashi and Yasuko Matsui, and was not well received.

Kobayashi directed Matsui again, with two other prominent pink film actresses of the time, in Pleasure of a Bitch (あばずれの悦楽, Abazure no Kairaku) (1967). This action-filled sex film had the trio disguising themselves as men to rob a bank. Kobayashi became a director for Nikkatsu's Roman Porno series in the 1970s and Ms. Matsui followed him to the studio. Though, by this time, she was considered too old to be a leading character in these films, Matsui was often given prominent supporting roles.

=== Later career ===
Kobayashi's output did not slow in later years. He directed Roman Porno Queen Junko Miyashita in her film debut in I Lost Control of Myself Like This (1971). From 1972 until 1983 he made pink films for the Shochiku subsidiary, Tōkatsu. L'ambition dans le miroir (1972), his first film for the studio, was one of Kobayashi's largest productions. Other titles Kobayashi made for Tōkatsu include Pervert's Pitfall and The High School Girl Who Likes to Be Watched (both 1976), Peeping Assault (1977) and Looking from Below (1981).

Kobayashi kept up with changes in the Japanese adult entertainment field. During the "Big Bust Boom", in the wake of Kimiko Matsuzaka's February 1989 debut, Kobayashi directed several films in that genre. He directed early big-bust AV performer Natsuko Kayama's Big Tit Against Big Tit, Rubbing! (巨乳ＶＳ巨乳 こする！, Kyonyū tai Kyonyū: Kosuru!) (1990) for Excess, Nikkatsu's post-Roman Porno line of theatrical softcore pornography. Kobayashi also directed prominent post-Kimiko Matsuzaka era big-bust performer Shinobu Hosokawa in two films, Big Tit Soap, Come in the Valley! (巨乳ソープ 谷間でイって！, Kyonyū Soap Tanimade Itte!) (1996) and Big Tit Rape, Forced Paizuri (巨乳レイプ 強制パイズリ, Kyonyū Reipu: Kyōsei Paizuri) (1997). He produced and directed prominent AV idol Nao Saejima in her theatrical release, Erotic Ghost Story: Female Ghost in Heat (色欲怪談 発情女ゆうれい, Shikiyoku Kaidan: Hatsujō Onna Yūrei) (1995).

When Kobayashi's mentor, Teruo Ishii, planned his 1999 remake of Nobuo Nakagawa's Jigoku (1960), Kobayashi served as producer. Together with Ishii, Kobayashi was able to persuade Michiko Maeda, who had been banned from Japanese cinema 42 years before, to make her come-back appearance in the film. In 2000, Kobayashi formed his own production company, and continued directing films until the year of his death. Kobayashi died of bladder cancer on November 15, 2001.

Besides having a major impact on Japanese domestic cinema by introducing the pink film genre, the number of Kobayashi's feature films– over 400– makes him possibly the most prolific film director in Japan's cinematic history. The 2001 Pink Grand Prix– the leading award ceremony for the pink film– gave Kobayashi a posthumous Special Award for his career.
