= Flesh Market =

1962 film by Satoru Kobayashi

- Directed by: Satoru Kobayashi
- Written by: Roji Asama; Junichi Yoneya; Satoru Kobayashi
- Produced by: Ichirō Ikeda
- Starring: Tamaki Katori
- Music by: Sadao Nagase
- Production company: OP Eiga
- Release date: February 27, 1962
- Running time: 49 minutes
- Country: Japan
- Language: Japanese

Flesh Market (肉体の市場, Nikutai no Ichiba) is a 1962 Japanese film directed by Satoru Kobayashi and starring Tamaki Katori. It is generally recognized as the first movie in the pink film genre.

Flesh Market opened at the Ueno Okura Theater in Tokyo, which was operated by the film's production company OP Eiga, on February 27, 1962. Two days after the film opened, the Tokyo Metropolitan Police stopped the film's showing and confiscated all the prints and negatives. According to an interview with Kinya Ogawa, the film's Chief Assistant Director, the staff managed to put together a new version from rushes and extra footage, removing some of the more offensive scenes. The new film was immediately profitable probably because of the huge press coverage of the seizure event. A new term, eroduction, was invented to describe this emerging genre of film which later became known as pink film

== Synopsis ==
Only a 21-minute fragment remains of the original film which ran 49 minutes. From written accounts of the film, it concerned a young girl (played by Tamaki Katori) who is captured by criminals while investigating the mysterious suicide of her sister in Tokyo.

== Cast ==
- Tamaki Katori
- Hiroshi Asami
- Shirō Enami
- Kyōko Ōgimachi
- Tokiko Hisaki

== See also ==
- List of incomplete or partially lost films
