= The Glamorous Life of Sachiko Hanai =

- Release poster
- Directed by: Mitsuru Meike
- Written by: Takao Nakano
- Produced by: Nakato Kinukawa; Kyoichi Masuko; Kazuto Morita
- Starring: Emi Kuroda; Takeshi Ito; Yukijiro Hotaru; Tetsuaki Matsue; Kyoko Hayami
- Cinematography: Hiroshi Ito
- Edited by: Naoki Kaneko
- Music by: Taro Kataoka; Taro Kishioka
- Distributed by: Shintōhō Eiga; Palm Pictures (US)
- Release date: October 14, 2003
- Running time: 90 minutes
- Languages: Japanese, English

The Glamorous Life of Sachiko Hanai (花井さちこの華麗な生涯, Hanai Sachiko no karei na shōgai) (2003) was introduced as a pink film, with the title Horny Home Tutor: Teacher's Love Juice (発情家庭教師 先生の愛汁, Hatsujō katei kyōshi: sensei no aijuru) but it developed into a cult hit and the producers allowed director Mitsuru Meike to expand it into its present form. In 2007 the film was featured at the Santa Barbara International Film Festival.

== Plot ==
Sachiko Hanai (Emi Kuroda) works as a call girl or soap girl specializing in sexual roleplay, or cosplay. In her work, Sachiko portrays a home-tutor, hence the film's original title, Horny Home Tutor: Teacher's Love Juice. While at a café after one job, she witnesses an altercation between two men, one a North Korean and the other from the Middle East, who turn out to be spies in the middle of a transaction. When the argument escalates to gun-play, Sachiko foolishly starts to take a cell-phone picture of the incident and is shot in the forehead. Rather than killing her, the bullet lodges in her brain and gives her extraordinary mental powers, including the ability to understand languages of which she previously had no knowledge, arcane philosophical insight, advanced mathematical knowledge, and ESP. After fleeing from the scene, she finds a metal cylinder in her pocket which contains a cloned copy of the finger of United States President George W. Bush.

While waiting in Sachiko's house to reclaim the finger, the North Korean falls in love with her. Sachiko befriends and has sex with a philosophy professor and the professor hires her as his son's tutor. The professor's wife becomes suspicious and goes to a detective, who happens to be the man who shot Sachiko. Because Bush's fingerprint is capable of unleashing a nuclear holocaust, the North Korean wants the cylinder back. In the end he takes Sachiko and she uses her powers to direct them to a cave where they find a machine that can decide the fate of the world.

== Release ==
Palm Pictures has the American distribution rights and has promoted the film with their own trailers while Argo Pictures retains the original rights for Japan.
