= Kiyomi Itō =

Japanese actress

Kiyomi Itō (伊藤清美, Itō Kiyomi) is a Japanese actress best known for her performances in pink films. She was given Best Actress awards at the Pink Grand Prix for her work in this genre in 1990, 1992 and 1994.

== Life and career ==
Kiyomi Itō made her film debut in Ryūji Akitsu's High School Girl: Thrill of the Chase (1984). The same year she starred in prominent Pink shitenno (ピンク四天王) director Hisayasu Satō's directorial debut, Mad Love! Lolita Poaching (激愛！ロリータ密猟, Gekiai! Lolita mitsuro) aka Distorted Sense of Touch, and she became closely associated with Satō's work from that point on. Embodying what Jasper Sharp calls, "the dark heart at the centre of Hisayasu Satō's narratives", not only was Itō was one of the few actresses who would regularly submit to Satō's extreme cinematic vision, she also collaborated on several of Satō's scripts.

Itō's performance in Satō's Love - 0 = Infinity (1994, originally released as Dirty Wife Getting Wet (いやらしい人妻 濡れる, Iyarashii hitozuma: nureru)) earned her the Best Actress award at the first Pink Grand Prix. The film was also selected as the sixth best pink release of the year at the ceremony. When Kei Mizutani refused to appear in Weather Girl R, the sequel to her surprise 1993 cult-hit Weather Girl, Bandai Home Video chose Itō to take over Mizutani's part. Itō has also directed, helming the opening segment of the four-part gay pink film The Gays in Wonderland (1997).

== Bibliography ==
=== English ===
- "ITO KIYOMI". Complete Index to World Film.
- Kiyomi Ito at IMDb
- "KIYOMI ITO (second entry)". Complete Index to World Film.
- "Kiyomi Ito 伊藤清美". Urabon Navigator.
- Sharp, Jasper (2008). Behind the Pink Curtain: The Complete History of Japanese Sex Cinema. Guildford: FAB Press. pp. 251, 261, 265, 267–68, 270–71, 344–346, 355–58, etc. ISBN 978-1-903254-54-7.

=== Japanese ===
- 伊藤清美 いとう・きよみ (in Japanese). allcinema.net.
- "伊藤清美（いとうきよみ） (Profile and filmography)" (in Japanese). www.dmm.co.jp.
- 伊藤清美 (in Japanese). Japanese Movie Database.
- "伊藤清美 (second entry)" (in Japanese). Japanese Movie Database.

Awards and achievements
Pink Grand Prix
Preceded by Yuka Ishihara	Pink Grand Prix for Best Actress; Kiyomi Itō; 1990	Succeeded by Kanako Kishi
Preceded by Kanako Kishi	Pink Grand Prix for Best Actress; Kiyomi Itō; 1992	Succeeded by Yumika Hayashi
Preceded by Yumika Hayashi	Pink Grand Prix for Best Actress; Kiyomi Itō; 1994 for Dirty Wife Getting Wet	Succeeded by Hotaru Hazuki for Blissful Genuine Sex: Penetration!
