= Molester's Train =

- Country: Japan
- Language: Japanese language

Molester's Train (痴漢電車, Chikan densha) is a Japanese pink film series made by Academy Award–winning director Yōjirō Takita in 1982. By 1997, there had been 25 films made in the series. In their pioneering English-language work on Japanese erotic cinema, the Weissers write that "most of the episodes are reminiscent of early American nudie-cuties, especially the voyeuristic titty-flicks like Russ Meyer's Eve and the Handyman and Immoral Mr Teas, or Herschell Gordon Lewis' Adventures Of Lucky Pierre." The 1993 installment Nasty Behavior, which was directed by Hisayasu Satō and featured Yumika Hayashi, had an austere tone that was in direct contrast to the light, comic tone of the previous films in the series.

== List ==
- Get on from the Back! (1989)
- Nasty Behavior (1993)
- Housewife: Madam Is a Pervert (1994)
- Molester's Train: The Wart (1996)
- Suggestive Indecent Hips (2005)
- Sensitive Fingers (2007)
- Melody of Wriggling Fingers (2008)

== Awards ==
Get on from the Back! won several awards at the 1989 Pink Grand Prix ceremony, including Seventh Best Film, Best Actress for Yuka Ishihara, and Best Screenplay for Kyōko Godai. The Pink Grand Prix named Nasty Behavior the second best film of 1993, and Housewife: Madam is a Pervert the fourth best of 1994. The Wart received an Honorable Mention at the 1996 ceremony, and Maako Mizuno was given one of the Best New Actress Awards for her performance in the film. Suggestive Indecent Hips won the Bronze Prize at the 2005 Pink Grand Prix ceremony and was chosen Best Film of the Year by Film Treasures magazine In 2007, the Pink Grand Prix gave Sensitive Fingers several awards, including Best Film and Best New Actress for Miki Arakawa. Melody of Wriggling Fingers was named Ninth Best Film at the 2008 ceremony.
