= Yutaka Ikejima =

Japanese film director and actor (born 1948)

- Born: March 30, 1948 (age 78); Japan
- Occupations: Film director, actor, and producer
- Years active: 1981 –
- Partner: Kyōko Godai

Yutaka Ikejima (池島ゆたか, Ikejima Yutaka; or 池嶋ゆたか; born March 30, 1948) is a Japanese film director, actor, and producer. Considered the most successful filmmaker in the pink film genre in the 2000s, his films are popular with traditional pink film audiences, fans of cinema, and with critics. Because of his prolific contributions to the pink film he has earned the nickname "Mr. Pink".

== Life and career ==
"[Pink Eiga] is my lifework because it lets me earn money, play leading roles and touch naked women."
-- Yutaka Ikejima

Yutaka Ikejima was born on March 30, 1948. He studied Literature at Waseda University. He first entered the entertainment business in the late 1970s as an actor with Shuji Terayama's theatrical group Tenjō Sajiki.

His film debut was in the 1981 Genji Nakamura pink film Semi Documentary: Housewife Prostitution Team aka Document Porno: Married Woman Prostitution Techniques. In contrast to his stage career, in his screen work, Ikejima has stayed in the erotic genres. Between 1981 and 1988 he appeared in over 500 softcore pink films, working for such directors as Hisayasu Satō, Yōjirō Takita and Ryūichi Hiroki. Ikejima appeared in Satō's gay-themed Temptation of the Mask (1987), a film significant for joining three of the "Four Devils" or "Four Heavenly Kings of Pink" (ピンク四天王, pinku shitenno) in one work. Ikejima became one of Zeze Takahisa's "Zeze-gumi" (Zeze-group) of regulars including Takeshi Itō, Yōta Kawase and Yumeka Sasaki. Though most awarded and recognized as a director, Ikejima has continued acting to the present day.

He began his directorial career in 1988, at first working mainly in AVs (adult videos). His cinematic theatrical debut as a director was The Masturbating Lesbian (ザ・ＯＮＡＮＩＥレズ, Za Onanie Rezu) (1991). Through his production company Cement Match, Ikejima both stages plays and self-produces film. Cement Match has made films for all of the major pink film distribution companies, but most often produces for OP Eiga. Through this company he has produced such prominent pink films as Daisuke Goto's A Lonely Cow Weeps at Dawn (2003) and ENK's The Gays in Wonderland (1997). Also active in gay-themed films in both acting and directing careers, the 1996 gay film, Love Me Danger, directed by Ikejima, was chosen the 6th Best Film at the Pink Grand Prix. His Men Who Love (2002) was one of the first pink films to be shown at the Tokyo International Lesbian & Gay Film Festival.

In his pink film directorial career, Ikejima usually collaborates with his wife, screenwriter Kyōko Godai, who had previously made a name for herself scripting for Hisayasu Satō. Known for his professionalism and efficiency, when the original pink film version of The Glamorous Life of Sachiko Hanai went over-budget and behind schedule (because of its ambition and precarious production history, Jasper Sharp characterizes it as the Apocalypse Now of the pink film world), Ikejima was called in to film a temporary replacement, a task he accomplished in a few days. In 2008 Ikejima directed his 100th pink film, an accomplishment for which he was given a special award at the Pink Grand Prix.

== Partial filmography ==
=== Top-ten films, Pink Grand Prix: As director ===
- 1994 9th place (tie): Real Underwear Body (本番下半身, Homban Shitagitai)
- 1995 2nd place: Sexual Desires in the Ladies' Restroom: Dripping! (色情女子便所 したたる！, Shikijōjoshibenjo: Shitataru!)
- 1995 4th place: Mistake (ミステイク)
- 1996 4th place: SM Teacher: Tied Up by Students (ＳＭ教師 教え子に縛られて, SM Kyōshi: Oshieko ni Shibarete)
- 1996 6th place (tie): Love Me Danger (危なく愛して LOVE ME DANGER, Abunaku ai Shite)
- 1996 6th place (tie): Kogal*KoMadam*Wife*Beautiful Mature Woman: Lewd Carnival (コギャル・コマダム・人妻・美熟女 淫乱謝肉祭, Kogal*Komadam*Hitozuma*Bijukujo: Inran Shanikusai)
- 1997 4th place: Beautiful Secretary: Rip Off the Panty Hose (美人秘書 パンストを剥ぐ, Bijinhisho: Pansuto o Hagu)
- 1998 1st place: Twilight Dinner (超いんらん 姉妹どんぶり, Chōinran: Shimai Donburi)
- 1998 4th place: This Sort of Couple (こんな、ふたり, Konna Futari)
- 1998 6th place: Report on Blind Passion: Shameless (痴情報道 悦辱肉しびれ, Chijōhōdō: Etsuhaji Shibire)
- 1998 7th place: The Bride's Vibrator: Drilling (花嫁バイブ淫行 えぐる, Hanayome Baibu Inkō: Eguru)
- 2000 7th place: Sex Guy's Inn: Women's Wiggling Asses (性奴の宿 うごめく女尻, Seiyatsu no Yado: Ugokumeku Mejiri)
- 2000 9th place: Lolita-Colored Underpants (ロリ色の生下着, Loli Iro no Seishitagi)
- 2002 3rd place: Office Lady's Sexual Confession: Burning Love Affair (ＯＬ性告白 燃えつきた情事, OL Seikokuhaku: Moetsukita Jōji)
- 2002 8th place: Obscene Stalker: It Holds in Darkness! (猥褻ストーカー 暗闇で抱いて！, Waisetsu Stōkaa: Kurayami de Idaite!)
- 2002 9th place: Delivery Health Girl: The Moisture of Silken Skin (デリヘル嬢 絹肌のうるおい, Deriherujō: Kinuhada no Uruoi)
- 2003 2nd place: Adulterous Wife's Dirty Afternoon (不倫妻の淫らな午後, Furin-zuma no Midara na Gogo)
- 2003 9th place: Men Who Love (恋する男たち, Ai suru otoko-tachi)
- 2004 Honorable Mention: Wife Taxi: Crowded with Big Tits (人妻タクシー 巨乳に乗り込め, Hitozuma Takushii: Kyonyū ni Norikome)
- 2005 9th place: Snake that Makes the Wife Moist: Extreme SM Compilation (人妻を濡らす蛇 －ＳＭ至極編－, Hitozuma o Nururasu Hebi: SM Shigokuhen)
- 2005 10th place: The Snake that Makes the Kimono's Underwear Moist: SM Compilation (襦袢を濡らす蛇 －ＳＭ開華編－, Jaban o Nururase Hebi: SM Kaikahen)
- 2006 3rd place: Hostess Madness: Unparched Nectar
- 2006 5th place: Shōwa Erotic Romance: The Virgin's Bashfulness (昭和エロ浪漫 生娘の恥じらい, Shōwa Ero Rōman: Kimusume no Hajirai)
- 2006 6th place: Mature Woman: Wife-Hunting (熟女 人妻狩り, Jukujo: Hitozuma Karu)
- 2007 8th place: Fascinating Woman: The Temptation of Creampie (奪う女 中出しの誘惑, Ubau Onna: Nakadashi no Yūwaku)
- 2008 1st place: Chō Inran: Yarebayaruhodo Iikimochi (超いんらん やればやるほどいい気持ち)
- 2008 4th place: Hanjuku Baishun: Itohiku Aishiru (半熟売春 糸ひく愛汁)
- 2008 6th place: Best Friend's Wife: The Black Panties of a Secret Rendezvous (親友の妻 密会の黒下着, Shinyū no Tsuma: Mikkai no Kuroshitagi)

=== Pinky Ribbon Awards ===
- 2008 Gold Prize: Chō Inran: Yarebayaruhodo Iikimochi (超いんらん やればやるほどいい気持ち)
- 2008 Pearl Prize: Hanjuku Baishun: Itohiku Aishiru (半熟売春 糸ひく愛汁)

== Bibliography ==
=== English ===
- Sharp, Jasper (2008). Behind the Pink Curtain: The Complete History of Japanese Sex Cinema. Guildford: FAB Press. pp. 332–334, 345. ISBN 978-1-903254-54-7.
- Weisser, Thomas; Yuko Mihara Weisser (1998). Japanese Cinema Encyclopedia: The Sex Films. Miami: Vital Books : Asian Cult Cinema Publications. pp. 190–191. ISBN 1-889288-52-7.
- "YUTAKA IKEJIMA". Complete Index to World Film.
- Yutaka Ikejima at IMDb
- "Yutaka Ikejima". pinkeiga.com. Archived from the original on April 3, 2009.

=== Japanese ===
- 池島ゆたか いけじま・ゆたか (in Japanese). allcinema.net.
- 池島ゆたか (in Japanese). Japanese Movie Database.
- "Variety Japan" 池島ゆたか （イケジマユタカ） (in Japanese). Variety Japan.
- 池島ゆたか イケジマユタカ (in Japanese). www.walkerplus.com. Archived from the original on 2005-03-09.

Awards and achievements
Pink Grand Prix
Preceded by Yumi Yoshiyuki for Sisters Donburi: No Pulling Out	Pink Grand Prix for Best Director; Yutaka Ikejima; 1998 for Moon Light Dinner	Succeeded by Yūji Tajiri for Office Lady Love Juice
Preceded by Tetsuya Takehora for Lustful Hitchhiker: Sought Wife	Pink Grand Prix for Best Director; Yutaka Ikejima; 2006 for Hostess Madness: Unparched Nectar	Succeeded by Yoshikazu Katō for Molester's Train: Sensitive Fingers
Preceded by Shirō Shimomoto for Uncle's Paradise	Pink Grand Prix for Best Actor; Yutaka Ikejima; 2007 for Company President's Secretary: Hunting Big Tit Sexual Harassment	Succeeded by Seiji Nakamitsu for Best Friend's Wife: The Black Panties of a Secret Rendezvous
Preceded by Yoshikazu Katō for Molester's Train: Sensitive Fingers	Pink Grand Prix for Best Director; Yutaka Ikejima; 2008 for Chō Inran: Yarebayaruhodo Iikimochi	Succeeded by Naoyuki Tomomatsu for Maid-Droid
