= Slow =

slow may refer to various basic dictionary-related meanings:

- Slow velocity, the rate of change of position of a moving body
  - Slow speed, in kinematics, the magnitude of the velocity of an object
- Slow tempo, the speed or pace of a piece of music
- Slow motion, an effect in film-making
- Slow reaction rate, the speed at which a chemical reaction takes place

Slow, SLOW, Slowing or Slowness may also refer to:

== Music ==
- Slow (band), a 1980s Canadian band

=== Albums ===
- Slow (Richie Kotzen album), 2001
- Slow (Starflyer 59 album), 2016
- Slow (Luna Sea album), 2005
- Slow (Ann Hampton Callaway album), 2004
- Slowness (album), an album by cantopop singer Kay Tse

=== Songs ===
- "Slow" (Kylie Minogue song), 2003
- "Slow" (Rumer song), 2010
- "Slow" (Matoma song), 2017
- "Slow" (Jackson Wang & Ciara song), 2023
- "Slow" (Black Midi song), 2021
- "Slow", song by The Fratellis from the album Eyes Wide, Tongue Tied (2015)
- "Slow", song by Lisa Mitchell from the EP Said One to the Other
- "Slow", song by Professional Murder Music from the album Professional Murder Music

== Film ==
- Slow (2023 film), Lithuanian romantic drama

== Books ==
- In Praise of Slow, a 2004 book by Carl Honoré containing his analysis of the "Cult of Speed"
- Slowness (novel), a 1993 novel by Milan Kundera

== Culture ==
- Slow dance, a type of partner dance
- Slow movement (culture), a cultural movement that emphasizes a slower pace in a variety of lifestyle and social areas
  - Slow living, a lifestyle applying the Slow Movement philosophy
  - Slow reading, the intentional reduction of the speed of reading
  - Slow Food, an organization that promotes local food and traditional cooking

== People ==
- Slow (DJ) (born 1975), Finnish producer and DJ
- Húŋkešni or "Slow", the nickname of Sitting Bull, a Hunkpapa Lakota leader
- Edward Slow (1841–1925), English poet
- Mary Taylor Slow (1898–1984), British physicist
- Robin Slow (born c. 1948), New Zealand Māori painter
- Karen Slowing (born 1968), Guatemalan swimmer
- Melanie Slowing (born 1973), Guatemalan swimmer

== Other uses ==
- South London Orienteers and Wayfarers (SLOW), an orienteering club
- Slowness (seismology), a property of a seismic wave

== See also ==
- Slow learner (disambiguation)
- Slowe (disambiguation)
- Slough (disambiguation)
- Sloe or Prunus spinosa, a plant
- SLO (disambiguation)
- Slower (disambiguation)
- Too slow
