= 3/8 =

3/8 or 3/8 may refer to:

- 3rd Battalion, 8th Marines
- the calendar date March 8 (United States)
- the calendar date August 3 (Gregorian calendar)
- the fraction, three eighths or 0.375 in decimal
- a time signature
- 3/8 (album), a 2007 album by Kay Tse
