= Juno Mak =

Hong Kong singer, actor, and director (born 1984)

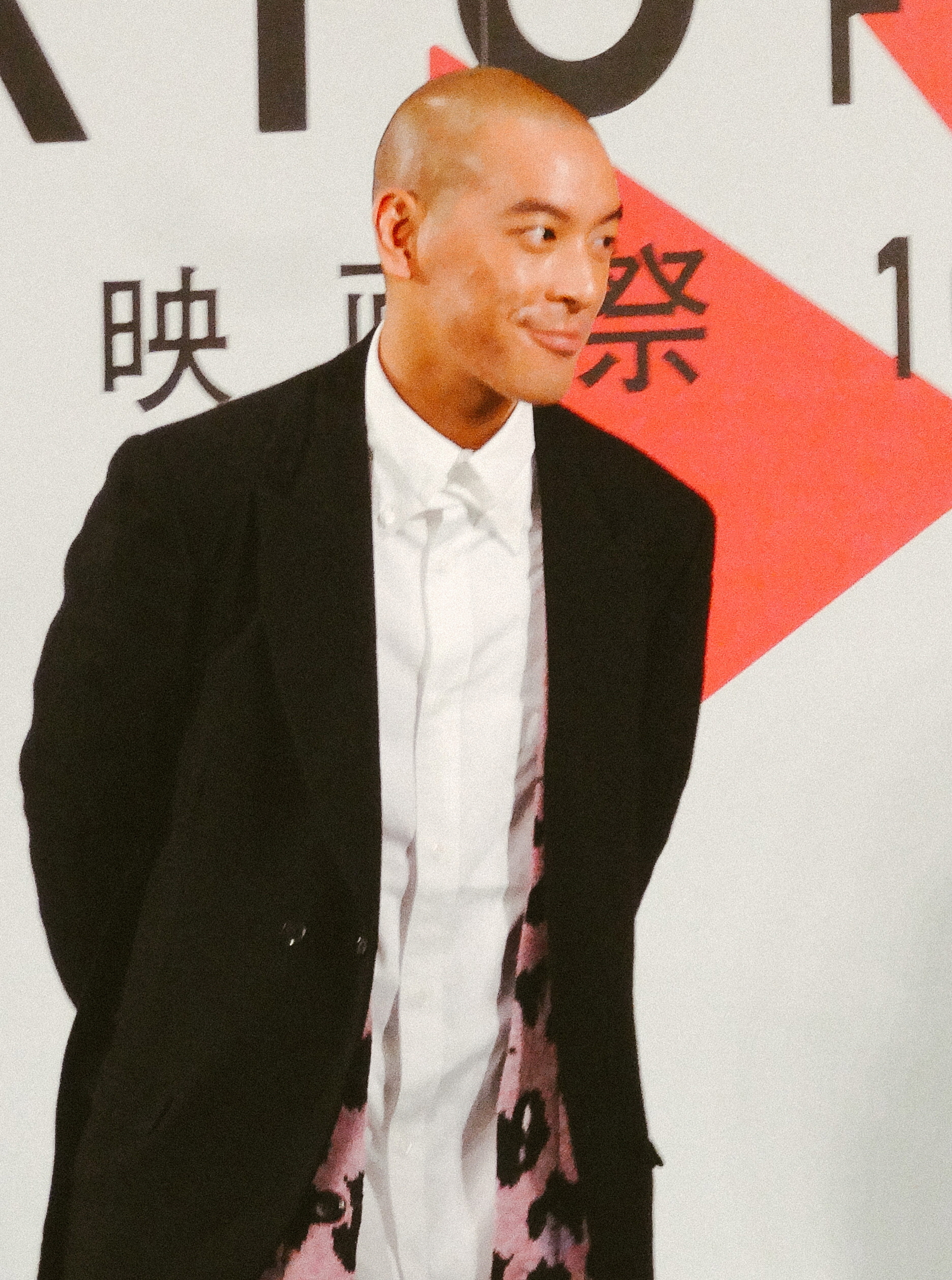
- Mak at the 26th Tokyo International Film Festival
- Born: Bobby Mak Wan Yin (麥允然); 18 March 1984 (age 42); British Hong Kong
- Occupations: Singer; record producer; actor
- Years active: 2002–present
- Parent: Clement Mak
- Awards: Golden Horse Awards – FIPRESCI Prize; 2013 Rigor Mortis

Chinese name
- Traditional Chinese: 麥浚龍
- Simplified Chinese: 麦浚龙
Transcriptions
Standard Mandarin
- Hanyu Pinyin: mai4 jun4 long2
Yue: Cantonese
- Jyutping: maak6 zeon3 lung4
- Musical career
- Genres: Cantopop
- Labels: Silly Thing (2004–present); Universal Music Group (2002–2003)

Juno Mak (Chinese: 麥浚龍; born 18 March 1984) is a Hong Kong singer, record producer, actor, and director. He made his musical debut in 2002 with the EP On the Road. His albums have won Best Record three times at the Ultimate Song Chart Awards Presentation.

He made his directorial debut with the horror film Rigor Mortis in 2013.

== Career ==
=== Music ===
Mak began his music career as a pop singer with Universal Music. Two albums, On the Road and Next Step, were released with Universal Music. Both albums reached the top spot on TVB. Although he won awards upon his debut, it was later rumoured that his fans were hired professional groupies earning up to HKD150 an hour, and in 2002 he was booed by audience members during an awards ceremony.

Mak's 2015 EP Addendum spawned the number one singles "Unforgettable" (念念不忘), "Imperfection" (瑕疵), and the award-winning duet "Rashōmon" (羅生門), a duet with Kay Tse.

=== Film ===
In 2010, Mak wrote and starred in Wong Ching-po's film Revenge: A Love Story. The film was a hybrid of slasher and love story. Mak and Wong Ching-po collaborated again in 2011 on the film Let's Go!.

In 2013, Mak directed the film Rigor Mortis, which pays tribute to the 1980s Jiangshi genre. In 2015, it was announced Mak would direct the crime thriller Sons of the Neon Night.

== Anti-graft investigation ==
In 2003, Mak, his father, and a number of music executives from TVB and Universal Music HK were arrested as part of an investigation into an alleged bribes-for-awards scam. The case was eventually withdrawn with no charges made.

== Personal life ==
Mak is the second son of Clement Mak, the chairman of CCT Fortis Holdings Limited.

== Discography ==
- On the Road (2002)
- Next Step (2003)
- Proto (2004)
- Otherside (2005)
- Walking Underneath (New + Best Selection) (2005)
- Chapel of Dawn (2007)
- Words of Silence (2008)
- Why (2008)
- The Dream (天生地夢) (2009)
- Nothing Lasts Forever (New + Best Selection) (2010)
- No-mind (無念) (2011)
- Paradoxically, Yours (柔弱的角) (2014)
- Addendum (2015)
- Evil Is a Point of View (2016)
- The Album Part One (with Kay Tse; 2018)
- The Album and the Rest of It (with Kay Tse; 2019)
- The Album and the End of It (with Kay Tse; 2020)

== Filmography ==
=== Filmmaking credits ===
Year	Title	Credited as			Notes
Year	Title	Director	Writer	Producer	Notes
2011	Let's Go!	No	No	Yes	
2013	Rigor Mortis	Yes	Yes	Yes	Nominated – Golden Horse Award for Best New Director
2025	Sons of the Neon Night	Yes	Yes	Yes	

=== Acting roles ===
Film

Year	Film	Role
2003	Truth or Dare: 6th Floor Rear Flat	Nick
2010	Dream Home	Cop Fat
2010	Revenge: A Love Story	Chan Kit
2011	Let's Go!	Lee Siu Sheung

Television

Year	Film	Role
2003	Survivor's Law	Ma Ching-Kin
