= The First Day =

The First Day may refer to:

- The First Day (David Sylvian and Robert Fripp album)
- The First Day (Kay Tse album)
- The First Day (film)
- "The First Day" (The Owl House), an episode of The Owl House
- "The First Day" (Designated Survivor), a second episode of the first season of an American political thriller series Designated Survivor.
- "The First Day" (Summer Camp Island), an episode of Summer Camp Island
