= Sola Aoi =

Japanese model and former porn performer (born 1981)

Sora Aoi
- 蒼井 そら
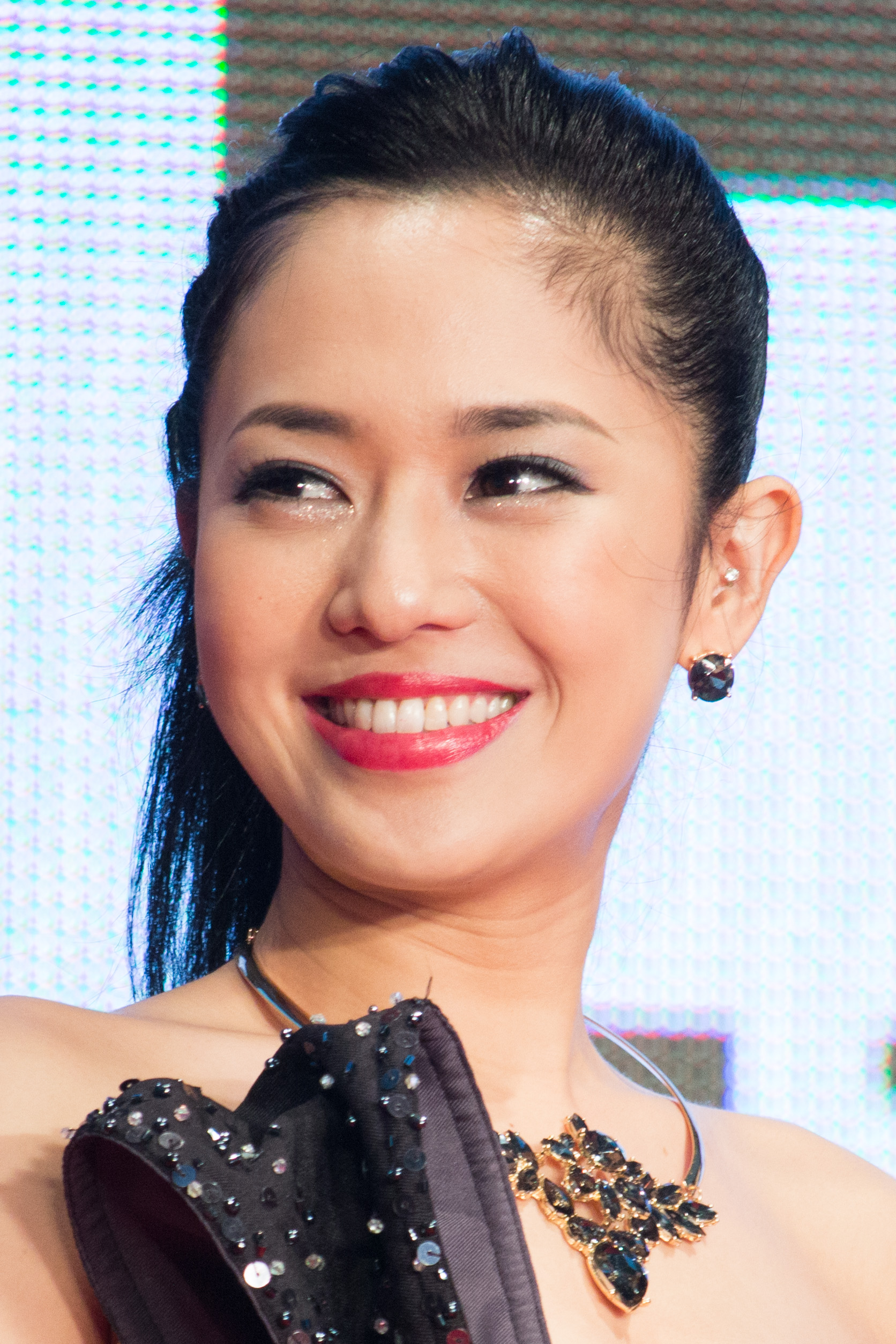
- Aoi in 2015
- Born: Junko (Note: Surname undisclosed); April 26, 1981 (age 45); Kanagawa, Japan
- Other name: Sora Aoi
- Occupations: Actress; talent; singer
- Years active: 2002–present
- Height: 1.55 m (5 ft 1 in)
- Spouse: DJ Non (m. 2018)
- Children: 2
- Website: http://www.aoisola.net/

Sola Aoi (Japanese: 蒼井 そら, Hepburn: Aoi Sora; born April 26, 1981) is a Japanese former AV idol, nude model, and actress. Starring in more than 600 adult films between 2002 and 2011, Aoi is widely considered to be one of the most popular adult videos (AV) idols of the 2000s. Her popularity as a porn actress alone has led to celebrity status as a media personality both in Japan and internationally.

== Life and career ==
=== Early life and AV debut ===
Sora Aoi was born on April 26, 1981, in Kanagawa. As a student, she worked at various part-time jobs in the food-service industry, such as pizza parlors, pubs and sushi bars with the intent of becoming a pre-school teacher. While in her third year in high school, Aoi was scouted in Shibuya by a talent agency for gravure modelling. She decided to enter the adult entertainment industry with the aim of eventually working on TV and in other parts of the entertainment industry, stating that "If there was only the AV industry, I couldn't do it."

When asked how her stage name was chosen, Aoi explained: "My agency asked what color I liked. I said blue [aoi in Japanese]. He also asked what I like in general. I said sky [sora in Japanese]. So, he chose Aoi Sora."

Aoi appeared as a gravure idol in the June 2002 issue of Bejean and then made her debut in adult videos (AV) in July 2002, with Happy Go Lucky! for the Alice Japan studio, part of the Kuki Inc. group which was one of Japan's largest producers of pornography at the time. The next month, she appeared in the AV The Blue Sky on the Samansa label for the Max-A studio, also part of the Kuki group. For her video appearances in 2002, Aoi was awarded the Second Place Award as Best New Actress in the 2002 X City Grand Prix Awards. Aoi continued making videos for both Alice Japan and Max-A for almost two-and-a-half years until late 2004.

While continuing to perform in hardcore AVs, Aoi also appeared in the first video release of the Shuffle company's new label Believe. Entitled The Naked Body, this June 2003 release was an "image video", which has nude modeling but features no sex.

=== Into mainstream entertainment ===
During this period, Aoi also started making appearances in mainstream media. In May 2003, she had a role in the theatrical release Gun Crazy 4: Requiem for a Bodyguard and from July to December 2003, Aoi had a role in the TV Asahi J-dorama Tokumei Kakarichō Tadano Hitoshi. For her starring role in the pink film, Tsumugi (制服美少女 先生あたしを抱いて, Seifuku bishōjo: Sensei atashi wo daite), released to theaters in July 2004, Aoi was given a Best Actress Award at the 2004 Pink Grand Prix ceremony. The film was ranked the fourth-best pink film release of the year.

Aoi also starred in the October 2004 release of the manga-based theatrical thriller Stop the Bitch Campaign: Hell Version. According to one reviewer of the June 2007 DVD release of the film: "The acting proves that Sora Aoi is no Dame Judi Dench but she is winsome enough to make you believe and care for her."

In November 2004, Aoi left Alice Japan and Max-A to move to the newly formed studio, S1 No. 1 Style, part of the large Hokuto Corporation. Her first video for S1, Sell Debut, was directed by Hideto Aki and released on November 11, 2004. Aoi continued making about one video a month for S1 until mid-2006. By this time, Aoi had become one of the most popular AV idols in Japan. Her name was the second most popular internet search on a female celebrity in Japan for 2005.

Aoi's popularity enabled her to enter further into mainstream entertainment, including film, television and radio. In early 2005, she starred as a high-school girl in director Keisuke Yoshida's film Raw Summer (なま夏, Nama-natsu). The romantic comedy, released theatrically in Japan in January 2005, won the Grand Prize in the Off Theater Competition at the 2006 Yubari International Fantastic Film Festival where it was screened in February 2005. Along with another AV idol, Akiho Yoshizawa, Aoi appeared in the late-night TV Tokyo manga-based production Jōō (嬢王) which aired in 12 episodes from October to December 2005. Aoi later returned in a special guest appearance for the 2009 sequel to the show Jōō Virgin (嬢王 Virgin).

In another venue, Aoi was one of several AV actresses asked by a small Japanese publisher to take photographs of themselves as "if the [toy] cameras [were] their boyfriends or undetestable stalkers". The result, Polgasun Aoisora, was warmly received by a reviewer for the journal European Photography, who wrote, "It would appear that in Polgasun she is trying to swap the wretchedness and banality of the pornography genre for intimacy and authenticity."

By 2006, Aoi was appearing regularly on television, often appearing on variety shows and acting in several dramas including the 2006 midnight-drama Shimokita GLORY DAYS (下北GLORY DAYS) along with fellow S1 actresses Yuma Asami and Honoka and singer-actress Aya Sugimoto. Aoi plays the character "Nozomi Ichimonji" in the manga-based series about a ronin student moving to Tokyo and sharing a house with several beautiful women. She was also cast in the TV Asahi midnight drama Kaikan shokunin (快感職人) which aired from July to September 2006, and in late 2007 she was a guest star on the popular J-dorama detective show Galileo (ガリレオ).

=== International exposure ===
Aoi remained at S1, but her work in adult videos became irregular after mid-2006. One of her S1 videos, Hyper Risky Mosaic – Special Bath House Tsubaki, with 11 other S1 actresses won the First Place Award at the 2007 AV Open contest. In July 2011, S1 released a new work, Mega Semem Bukkake Facial, but since then the studio has only published compilation videos for Aoi through late 2013. The major Japanese adult video distributor DMM held a poll of its customers in late 2012 to choose the 100 all-time best AV actresses to celebrate the 30th anniversary of adult videos in Japan. Aoi was voted into 53rd place in the balloting.

As a singer, Aoi released one album in 2006 titled Hadaka no Kiss. She was a member of the first generation Ebisu Muscats between 2008 and 2013.

Aoi traveled to Thailand for a part in a mainstream Thai teen movie, Hormones (Pid Term Yai, Hua Jai Waa Wun), released in March 2008. She plays a Japanese tourist who brings one character to the brink of infidelity to his girlfriend. Hormones won the Jury's Special Prize at the fourth Asian Marine Film Festival in Japan which journalist Wise Kwai ascribed to Aoi's presence.

Aoi made her debut in another Asian entertainment market when she appeared in a Korean TV drama Korean Classroom in May 2009. The four-part series follows three Japanese girls traveling to Korea and co-stars fellow AV Idols Mihiro and Rio. Aoi was subsequently scheduled to appear on several Korean variety shows while in Korea to promote the series. Back in Japan, Aoi starred as a zombie-killing stripper in director Takao Nakano's May 2010 comedy horror film Big Tits Zombie, a film adaption of the cult manga Kyonyū Dragon. Later that year Aoi was in Hong Kong starring in the erotic thriller Revenge: A Love Story which reached theaters in December 2010.

In late April 2010, Aoi's Twitter account was discovered by many Chinese netizens, despite the social networking site's typically being inaccessible in China. Fans of the AV model began distributing software allowing them to bypass the censorship of Twitter. Following the 2010 Yushu earthquake in China's Qinghai Province, Sola Aoi announced that she would raise funds to donate to the earthquake victims. This was received by a mixed response by Chinese netizens, with some praising her help and others finding it unseemly.

In November 2010, she opened a microblog on Sina Weibo, China's most popular domestic microblog service, posting in Japanese, English, and Chinese. In her first six hours on Sina Webo, she attracted 130,000 followers and by September 2012 that figure had risen to more than 13 million. Her sizable following in China has also led to her debut as a singer in Mandarin Chinese with the song "mao yi" (毛衣 or Sweater) which was released digitally for mobile phone and computer download.

In April 2011, Aoi had a starring role in the Indonesian horror movie Suster Keramas 2 (Shampooing or Evil Nurse 2), making her the third Japanese AV actress to appear in Indonesian films recently. The others being Rin Sakuragi in the original Suster Keramas and Maria Ozawa, known in Indonesia as "Miyabi", in the 2009 film Kidnapping Miyabi. The earlier films, although very successful, engendered protests from conservative Muslim groups in Indonesia, so Aoi's trip to Indonesia and participation in the film were kept secret. Aoi said that working in Indonesia gave her pause but she wanted to expand her mainstream career and that she was "really looking forward to coming into contact with foreigners and engaging in communication."

Around 2011, Aoi retired from the AV industry, with her last original AV being Sora Aoi Mega Cum Facials, directed by Hasumi Kuka and released on June 7, 2011. S1 also released several omnibus compilations over the next few years including a 3-disk, 12 hour long compilation titled All 97 Production S1 12 Hours Sora Aoi Complete BEST which compiled scenes from every film she's done with the studio. In 2019, distribution of her AV work has been discontinued from the Japanese e-commerce retailer FANZA (formerly known as DMM.com) and her profile from S1's website has also been deleted. In a blog post Aoi revealed that she herself requested this action due to her pregnancy and new family life: "By halting sales, I do not want to erase the past," Aoi added in the blog post. "But I also do not want to do nothing. I can not erase the past even if wanted to erase it. I stopped selling the official titles. But illegal versions are scattered about the internet if one looks."

Aoi's high profile in China has also led to controversy, exemplified by the taunts and insults directed towards her because of her plea in September 2012 for a peaceful solution to the Senkaku Islands dispute between Japan and China. In May 2013, a "culture war" ensued when a work of calligraphy created by Aoi as a guest promoting a theme park in Ningbo, China in April 2013 was reportedly auctioned for $95,000. A government-backed newspaper called the calligraphy "childish", her fans supported her, and many considered the auction simply a publicity stunt by the theme park.

On May 5, 2012, it was reported that Aoi would be debuting in South Korea as a singer and actress and would be cast in a future Korean movie, titled Vacance. She continued to work as an actress in small roles including a small cameo appearance in the Chinese sex comedy Naked Ambition 2. She also appeared in the 2014 Thai romantic comedy I Fine..Thank You..Love You.

=== Brand collaborations ===
In 2022, Sola Aoi was named as the WE88 Global Brand Ambassador for 2022/23 to promote and boost the brand's presence across Asia.

In December 2022, Sola Aoi collaborated with a Malaysian rapper, singer, songwriter, filmmaker and actor Namewee as the main female lead in a music video, "Someone Else's Wife" (Chinese: 別人的老婆).

== Personal life ==
On January 3, 2018, Aoi announced her marriage to musician DJ Non. On December 12, 2018 she announced her pregnancy. She gave birth to twin boys on May 1, 2019.

== Filmography ==
=== TV drama ===
Title	Network	Character	Date	Notes
Tokumei Kakarichō Tadano Hitoshi 特命係長 只野仁	TV Asahi		2003-07-04 (Episode 1)	11 episodes (2003-07-04 to 2003-09-19)
Mystery Minzoku Gakusha Yakumo Itsuki ミステリー民俗学者八雲樹 (Mystery Folklore Scholar Yakumo Itsuki)	TV Asahi	Anna Nikaido	2004-10-29 (Episode 3)	
Jyouou 嬢王	TV Tokyo	Nikaido Arisa	2005-10-07 to 2005-12-23	12 episodes
Shimokita GLORY DAYS 下北GLORY DAYS	TV Tokyo	Nozomi Ichimonji	2006-04-14 to 2006-07-08	12 episodes
Kaikan Shokunin 快感職人	TV Asahi		2006-07-08 to 2006-09-23	10 episodes Released as a DVD 2006-11-22
Galileo ガリレオ	Fuji TV	Reiko Shinozaki	2007-11-05 (Episode 4)	

=== V-Cinema ===
Title	Company	Director	Release date	Notes
High School Teacher 高校教師 飼育の校舎; Koukou Kyoushi Shiiku no Kousha	Engel	Hiroshi Ando	November 25, 2003	Role: Miyako/Kumiko
Erotic Ghost: Siren 新妖女傳說 Siren; Shin Youjo Densetsu Siren		Satoshi Torao	October 22, 2004	Role: Yumi
Hotaru The Hyper Swindler Series Vol. 3 新だまし屋本舗・蛍 ～おいしいバイトにご用心～ Shin Damashi Ya Honpo・Hotaru ~Oishii Baito ni go Youjin~	Nextacv; NEXD-011	Nisato Takeshi	November 4, 2005	Role: Hotaru Amami
Hotaru The Hyper Swindler Series Vol. 4 新だまし屋本舗・蛍 ～ペーパー商法にご用心～ Shin Damashi Ya Honpo・Hotaru ~Peepaa Shouhou ni go Youjin~	Nextacv; NEXD-014	Nisato Takeshi	December 7, 2005	Role: Hotaru Amami
Kunoichi 5 ninshū Vs. Onna Dragon Shūdan くの一五人衆VS女ドラゴン集団		Kenji Tanigaki	October 25, 2005	
Hotaru The Hyper Swindler Series Vol. 5 新だまし屋本舗・蛍 ～美容詐欺を撲滅せよ～ Shin Damashi Ya Honpo・Hotaru ~Biyou Sagi o Bokumetsu Seyo~	Nextacv; NEXD-025	Nisato Takeshi	July 5, 2006	Role: Hotaru Amami
Hotaru The Hyper Swindler Series Vol. 6 新だまし屋本舗・蛍 ～フランチャイズ詐欺を撲滅せよ～ Shin Damashi Ya Honpo・Hotaru ~Furanchaizu Sagi o Bokumetsu Seyo~	Nextacv; NEXD-024	Nisato Takeshi	August 4, 2006	Role: Hotaru Amami
Play Angels Vol. 1 プレイエンジェル Vol. 1		Nisato Takeshi	July 11, 2007	Role: Anna
Play Angels Vol. 2 プレイエンジェル Vol. 2		Nisato Takeshi	February 6, 2008	Role: Anna
My Sassy Girl 蒼空; Aozora		Jojo Hideo	September 22, 2008	Role: Shiori; Sora Aoi wrote the screenplay for Aozora.

=== Theatrical releases ===
Title	Company	Director	Release date	Notes
Gun Crazy: Episode 4 ＧＵＮ ＣＲＡＺＹ Ｅｐｉｓｏｄｅ４ 用心棒の鎮魂歌; Gun Crazy Episode4 Youjinbou no Rekuiemu	Pioneer LDC / Japan Home Video	Atushi Muroga	May 10, 2003	Role: Maria
Heat; HEAT 灼熱; Shakunetsu	KSS	Takeshi Yokoi	February 14, 2004	
Tsumugi (AKA Uniform Beauty: Shag Me Teacher!)	Kokuei / Shintōhō Eiga	Hidezaku Takahara	July 27, 2004	Role: Tsumugi Yamane
Love Twisted ともしび; Tomoshibi	Euro Space (ーロスペース)	Ryouko Yoshida	August 21, 2004	Role: Yuko Yajima
Stop the Bitch Campaign: Hell Version 援助交際撲滅運動 地獄変; Enjo-Kousai Bokumetsu Undou: Jigoku-hen	King Records/ Omuro	Kosuke Suzuki	October 2, 2004	Role: Aoi
Raw Summer なま夏; Nama-Natsu	Powercat Entertainment	Keisuke Yoshida	January 28, 2005	Role: Anko
Man, Woman & The Wall 聴かれた女; Kikareta Onna No Mirareta Yoru		Masashi Yamamoto	April 15, 2006	Role: Satsuki
Memories of Matsuko	Toho / TBS	Tetsuya Nakashima	May 27, 2006	
Irokoishi 2: Roaming in Hokkaido 艶恋師 北海道 放浪編; Irokoishi: Hokkaidō Hourou Hen		Yūji Tajiri	January 28, 2008	Role: Ayumi
Tear Jar 泪壺; Namida Tsubo	Art Port (アートポート)	Takahisa Zeze	March 1, 2008	Role:
Hormones ปิดเทอมใหญ่ หัวใจว้าวุ่น; Pit Thoem Yai Hua Chai Wawun	GMM Tai Hub	Songyos Sugmakanan	20 March 2008	Role: Aoi
Gekijoban S to M ＳとＭ 劇場版	United Entertainment (ユナイテッド・エンタテインメント)	Yutaka Ōgi	March 13, 2010	Role: Sakiko Tsuboi
Big Tits Zombie	TMC (Total Media Corporation)	Takao Nakano	May 15, 2010	
Torso トルソ; Toruso	Transformer	Yutaka Yamazaki	July 10, 2010	
Revenge: A Love Story; Fuk sau che chi sei		Wong Ching-po	December 2, 2010	Role: Wing
Suster keramas 2	Maxima Pictures	Findo Purwono	April 21, 2011	Role: Sachiko
Three Points スリー★ポイント; Suri pointo	Ley Line	Masashi Yamamoto	May 14, 2011	Role: Saki
The Egoists 軽蔑; Keibetsu	Kadokawa Pictures	Ryūichi Hiroki	June 4, 2011	
I Fine..Thank You..Love You ไอฟาย..แต๊งกิ้ว..เลิฟยู้	GMM Tai Hub	Mez Tharatorn	December 10, 2014	Role: Kaya
Lazy Hazy Crazy 同班同學	Bravo Pictures / Sun Culture	Luk Yee-sum	October 29, 2015	

== Notes ==
Awards and achievements
Pinky Ribbon Awards
Preceded by New Award	Pinky Ribbon Award for Best New Actress; Sora Aoi; 2004; With: Mai Sakurazuki; Konatsu; Kyōko Natsume	Succeeded by Mari Yamaguchi; Sakurako Kaoru; Komari Awashima; Erina Aoyama
