= Fu Bo =

Fu Bo may refer to:

- Fu Bo (film), a 2003 Hong Kong film
- Fu Bo (footballer) (born 1965), Chinese football manager and former player

== See also ==
- FuBo, a nickname of Scottish comedian and writer Frankie Boyle
- FuboTV, an American streaming television service
- Ma Yuan (Han dynasty) (14 BC – 49 AD), known by his official title Fubo Jiangjun
