= Slowe =

Slowe may be the name of:

- Alistair Slowe (born 1988), English football player
- Christopher Slowe (born 1978), American businessman and internet personality
- Georgia Slowe (born 1966), English actress
- Lucy Diggs Slowe (1885-1937), American educator and athlete
- Vikki Slowe (born 1947), British printmaker and painter

== See also ==
- Slow (disambiguation)
- Slough (disambiguation)
