= Language learning (disambiguation) =

Language learning or language acquisition is the process by which humans acquire the capacity to use language.

Language learning may also refer to:

- Language Learning (journal), a scholarly journal covering language acquisition and learning
- Second language learning, the process of learning a second language and the scientific discipline studying that process
  - Language education, the process and practice of teaching or learning a second or foreign language through study
- Language processing, the mental process by which humans create and understand language

== See also ==
- Language (disambiguation)
- Learn (disambiguation)
