= K sus2 =

EP by Kay Tse
- Released: 2 June 2006
- Genre: Pop/Electronic/Country
- Length: 25:27(audio only)
- Label: Avex Asia
- Producer: Adrian Chou

Kay Tse chronology
Kay One (2005)	K sus2 (2006)	The First Day (2007)

K sus2 is an EP by Hong Kong singer Kay Tse, released on 2 June 2006.

== Track listing ==
1. "Follow Me" (跟我走)
2. "Filipino Love Song" (菲情歌)
3. "Gloomy Festival" (愁人節)
4. "A Deadly Journey" (亡命之徒)
5. "I Love Tea Diner"(我愛茶餐廳)
6. "A Deadly Journey" (亡命之徒) (4AM Electro Mix featuring DJ Tszpun & Seasons Lee)
