= Minoru Torihada =

Japanese comedian

Minoru Torihada (鳥肌実 Torihada Minoru) is a male Japanese comedian who claims to come from Sakhalin. His assumed surname, Torihada means "goosebumps" ("tori" meaning "bird" or class Aves, "hada" meaning "skin" or a soft outer covering of a vertebrate). He has an Internet channel called "Torijajiira Hōsō" (トリジャジーラ放送, or Torijazeera Broadcast), a parody of Al Jazeera.

== Biography ==
The central concept of his act is that Torihada claims to be an extreme right-winger and a supporter of imperialism and militarism. According to essayist Mike Rogers writing in 2005, he was "the first Japanese comedian to venture into taboo subjects like the Imperial Family and make a mockery of Imperial Japan."

== Filmography ==
Year	Title	Role
2000	Kemonogare, oreranosaruto	
2001	Bikyaku meiro	
2004	Devilman	
2004	Space police	
2005	Tanaka Hiroshi no Subete	Hiroshi Tanaka
2008	Goth	
2010	Love & Loathing & Lulu & Ayano	
2010	Helldriver	
2010	Big Tits Zombie	Blue Demon Devil

== Bibliography ==
- 廃人玉砕 ISBN 4-7926-0336-6

== Discography ==
- Tourism (トリズム) (2004)
- 鳥肌黙示録 (2001)
- 鳥肌実 (2001)
