= Rigor Mortis (film) =

2013 Hong Kong film by Juno Mak

- Theatrical release poster
- Traditional Chinese: 殭屍
- Simplified Chinese: 僵尸
- Hanyu Pinyin: Jiāng shī
- Jyutping: Goeng1 Si1
- Directed by: Juno Mak
- Written by: Philip Yung; Jill Leung; Juno Mak
- Produced by: Takashi Shimizu; Juno Mak; Executive Producers: Steven Lo; Bernard Lai
- Starring: Chin Siu-ho; Anthony Chan; Kara Hui; Lo Hoi-pang; Paw Hee-ching
- Cinematography: Ng Man-Ching
- Edited by: David Richardson
- Music by: Nate Connelly
- Production company: Great Sound Creation for Kudos Film
- Distributed by: Fortissimo Films
- Release dates: 4 September 2013 (Venice); 24 October 2013 (Hong Kong)
- Running time: 101 minutes
- Country: Hong Kong
- Language: Cantonese
- Budget: HK$15,000,000
- Box office: HK$16,781,408

Rigor Mortis is a 2013 Hong Kong action horror film directed by Juno Mak and produced by Takashi Shimizu. The film is a tribute to the Mr. Vampire film series. Many of the former cast are featured in this film: Chin Siu-ho, Anthony Chan, Billy Lau and Richard Ng. Additionally, Chung Fat, who starred in Encounters of the Spooky Kind, is also featured.

== Plot ==
Actor Chin Siu-ho, former star of Mr. Vampire, is suicidal after his wife and young son leave him. He moves into a dilapidated apartment building and hangs himself. His struggles draw the attention of twin girl ghosts who haunt the apartment, and they possess his body. Yau, a neighbor, bursts into the room, cuts the noose, and drives the spirits from Chin's body. Later, Chin visits Yau's restaurant, and Yau explains that his family are jiangshi (vampire)-hunters, and there were none left, he retired and took up cooking.

Elsewhere in the building, an elderly man named Uncle Tung falls down a stairwell and dies. His wife Meiyi, a sweet, well-loved old woman, asks Gau, a black magician, to resurrect Tung. Gau performs a ritual on the disfigured corpse and explains that Tung will revive after several days. Gau instructs Meiyi not to remove the coin mask he has put on Tung's face.

Chin meets Yang Feng, a traumatized single mother, and her son Pak. Chin learns from the apartment's security guard, Uncle Yin, that Yang and Pak previously lived in the unit he now occupies, and that the twin ghosts haunting the apartment were students being tutored there by Yang's husband. The husband raped one of the twins and was then stabbed by the other, who herself received mortal wounds in the scuffle. The remaining twin, distraught, hung herself. These ghosts caused Yang to flee the apartment. Chin resolves to banish the ghosts so that Yang and Pak can move in with him.

After Yau refuses to help, Chin returns to his room, and is ambushed by Gau, who performs a ritual on him that summons the twins. They possess Chin again and attack Gau. Yau rushes in, and together, Gau and Yau exorcise the ghosts from Chin, binding them in a cabinet. Yau instructs Gau to burn the cabinet: Gau promises to, but instead secretly keeps the cabinet.

Tung can move around, but doesn't react to anything. A desperate Meiyi pleads with Gau to use the more extreme measure, which involve using a virgin's blood. Uncle Yin, investigating Tung's absence, interrupts their discussion as he is suspicious of Gau's knowledge of black magic. When he asks Gau about Tung, Meiyi beats Yin to death with an urn. Later, young Pak visits Meiyi alone. Meiyi briefly hesitates before locking Pak in the bathroom with Tung's corpse with its mask removed. Tung murders the child as Meiyi tearfully stands outside.

The creation of the jiangshi alerts Yau. He rushes to Gau's apartment and finds Gau mortally wounded by Tung. Gau confesses to be responsible for Tung's original death, having thrown him over the rails after he had survived the initial fall. Being terminally ill, Gau had planned to bind the twin ghosts' souls in Tung's soulless body to gain power and extend his own life. By removing Tung's mask, Meiyi has let the jiangshi run amok. Yau alerts Chin, who rushes off to find Yang.

Yang, searching for her missing son Pak, unwittingly opens the cabinet containing the ghost twins, which escape. Yang encounters Pak, who to her dismay is now a ghost. Enraged, she tracks down the jiangshi and attempts to kill it, but it overwhelms and ultimately kills her. Chin arrives seconds later and sets the jiangshi aflame with a Molotov cocktail; while this appears to barely damage it, in the ensuing struggle the jiangshi crashes into a store of rice, and is immobilized. However, the twin ghosts appear and possess Tung's corpse. Revived, the powerful ghost-infused jiangshi easily impales Chin through the stomach with a pole and leaves him for dead.

Chin, terribly injured is found by Yau as he prepares to battle the jiangshi. Yau uses a spell to stop Chin's bleeding. Chin insists on helping, even though Yau warns him he will die. Using vampire hunting tools, Yau sets a trap that temporarily binds Tung to that location, allowing Chin to fight him. Yau uses his tools to weaken Tung, but Chin is unable to gain the upper hand before the trap expires. Yau sees that it is now dawn and drags the entangled Chin and Tung out a window, where they fall into the courtyard. The sunlight immediately begins to burn the vampire and the twin spirits are forced out. As Tung crumbles to ash, his humanity briefly returns when he witnesses Meiyi slit her own throat. Chin and Yau collapse from exhaustion.

In the final sequence, the audience learns that Chin actually died of suicide, and that the events the film chronicles were created by Chin's dying mind in the process leading to rigor mortis. The film's characters are people Chin saw on the way to his apartment: Yang and Pak are friendly neighbors, Meiyi is a widow admiring a picture of a late Tung, and Yau is a neighbor who rushes in too late to save the hanged Chin. At the morgue, Chin's adult son identifies the body for the medical examiner, Dr. Gau.

== Cast ==
- Chin Siu-ho as Chin Siu-ho
- Anthony Chan as Yau
- Kara Wai as Yang Feng
- Chung Fat as warlock Gau
- Lo Hoi-pang as janitor Uncle Yin, or Grandpa
- Richard Ng as Uncle Tung
- Paw Hee-ching as Auntie Meiyi
- Morris Ho as Pak
- Billy Lau as the cook

== Release ==
Rigor Mortis premiered at the Venice Film Festival.

== Reception ==
Rotten Tomatoes, a review aggregator, reports that 68% of 22 surveyed critics gave the film a positive review; the average rating was 6.02/10. Metacritic rated it 53/100 based on 8 reviews. Clarence Tsui of The Hollywood Reporter called it "a lavish, heavy-handed retreading and reinvention of Hong Kong and Japanese horror-film tropes, saved from clinical inhumanity by its veteran cast." Justin Chang of Variety described it as a "flashy, incoherent and virtually scare-free Hong Kong horror exercise". Daniel M. Gold of The New York Times called it a "relentlessly creepy film" that uses less comedy than Mr. Vampire. Martin Tsai of the Los Angeles Times wrote, "The film supplies a succession of hyper-stylized and potent set pieces without ever establishing any sort of internal logic."
