= Slew =

Slew may refer to:

== Motion control ==
- Slew (spacecraft), describes methods of changing the attitude of a spacecraft
- Slewing, the rotation of an object around an axis
- Eigenvector slew, a particular method of calculating the rotation required for a specific desired change in attitude

== People ==
=== Last name ===
- Jenny Slew (1719 – after 1765), Black American who sued for her freedom
- Jordan Slew (born 1992), English footballer

=== Nickname ===
- William Hester (1912–1993), American tennis player and official
- John S. McCain Sr. (1884–1945), United States Navy admiral

== Race horses ==
- Seattle Slew (1974–2002), American Triple Crown winner in 1977
- Slew o' Gold (1980–2007), U.S. Three Year-old Male Champion in 1983
- Slewacide (1980–2000), broodmare sire of Funny Cide

== Other uses ==
- Slew footing, an infraction in the sport of ice hockey
- Slew rate, the maximum rate of change of a signal at any point in a circuit
- The Slew, a multinational electronic music project

== See also ==
- Skew (disambiguation)
- Slough (disambiguation)
