= Kay Tse =

Hong Kong singer and actress

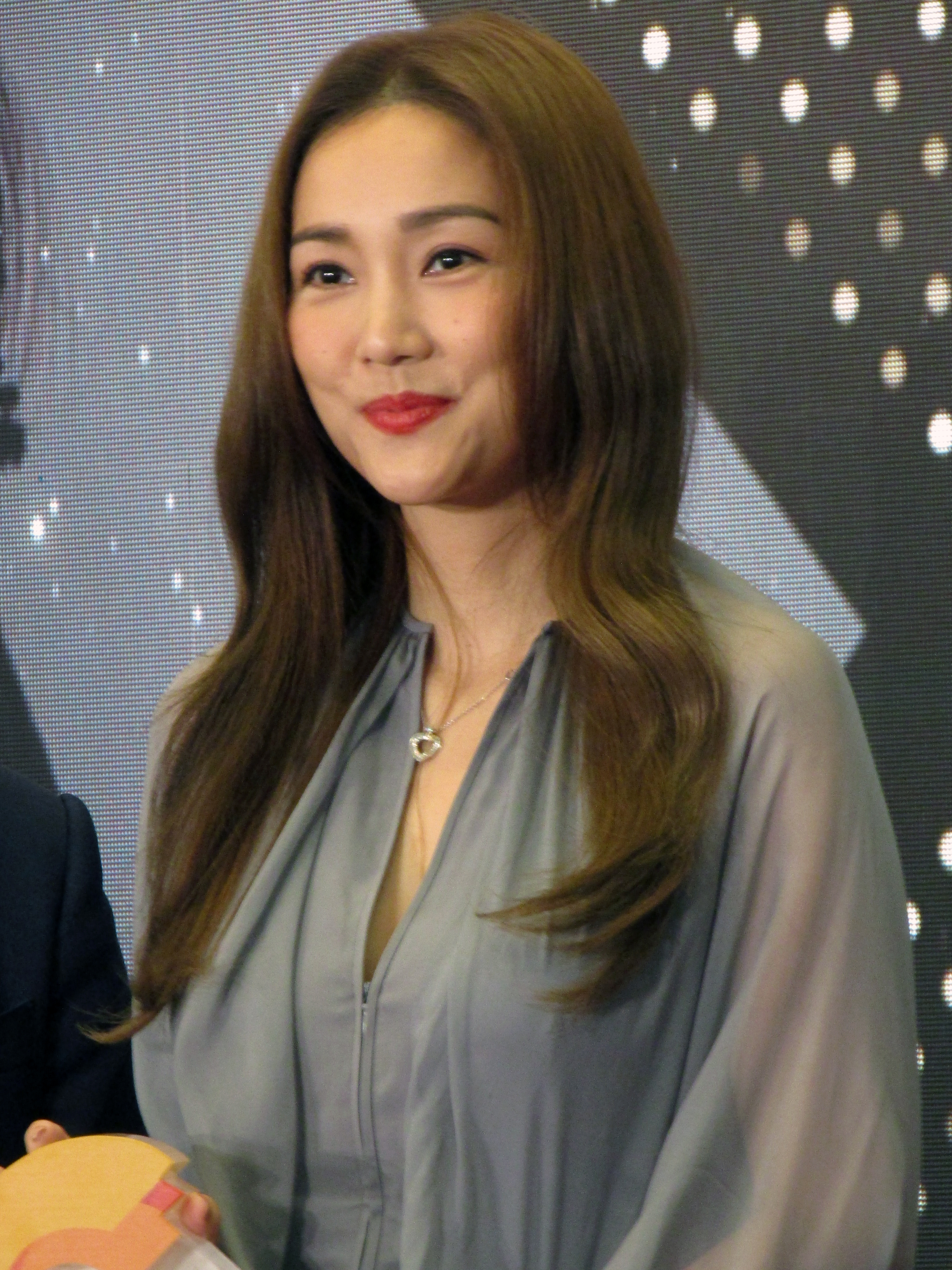
- Tse in 2023
- Born: 13 March 1977 (age 49); Tai Po, Hong Kong
- Education: University of Hong Kong
- Occupations: Singer; actress
- Years active: 2005–2016; 2018–present
- Spouse: Louis Cheung (m. 2007)
- Children: 2
- Musical career
- Origin: Hong Kong
- Genres: Cantopop, Mandopop
- Instruments: Vocals; piano; guitar
- Labels: Hong Kong: Avex Trax (2005–2006); Cinepoly (2006–2012); Stars Shine International (2013); Maya Entertainment Limited; (2014–2016); imagine.nation Entertainment Limited (2017–present); Taiwan: Universal Music (2010–2012); Gold Typhoon (2013–2014)

Chinese name
- Traditional Chinese: 謝安琪
- Simplified Chinese: 谢安琪
- Hanyu Pinyin: Xiè Ānqí
- Jyutping: ze^{6} on^{1} kei^{4}
Transcriptions
Standard Mandarin
- Hanyu Pinyin: Xiè Ānqí
Yue: Cantonese
- Jyutping: ze^{6} on^{1} kei^{4}

Kay Tse On-kay (Chinese: 謝安琪; born 13 March 1977) is a Hong Kong singer. She is a prominent figure in Hong Kong music and popular culture and was once frequently referred to in the media as a "grass-roots diva" and "goddess". She is known for songs which deal with social issues and the struggle for democracy in Hong Kong.

Tse's main claim to fame was her 2008 song, "Wedding Invitation Street" (囍帖街), which was widely successful and swept many prestigious year-end music awards. This was followed by a string of further hits, including "Song of the Year" (年度之歌), Lone Village (獨家村), "Hillwood Road" (山林道) and viral hits such as "The Egg and the Lamb" (雞蛋與羔羊) and "Rashomon" (羅生門). She is considered to be one of the four leading female Cantopop singers of the 2000s–2010s, along with Miriam Yeung, Joey Yung, and Denise Ho.

== Biography ==
=== Early life and discovery ===
Kay Tse was born on 13 March 1977 in Tai Po, Hong Kong, and was later raised in Wang Fuk Court when it was built in 1983, where almost the entire estate destroyed in a fire in November 2025. She is the only child of a Hakka family. She first learned to play the piano at the age of six, and has since obtained eighth-grade level. Tse attended Valtorta College, a state-funded Catholic high-school in Tai Po and obtained 21 points in her Hong Kong Certificate of Education Examination.

In 2025, Kay offered condolences to her friends and families lost in the

Tse began her studies at the University of Hong Kong in 2002, majoring in American Studies, and graduated in 2005. During this time, she entered a university singing competition, performing the Stefanie Sun song, "Believe" (相信). One of the judges was music producer Adrian Chow (周博賢), who was so impressed that he would sign her onto his independent label, "Ban Ban Music". At the time, Tse was also working part-time as a piano teacher and taught English.

=== 2005–2006: Career beginnings ===
Tse's debut album, Kay One, was released on 5 May 2005. The album combines an eclectic mix of pop, rock and jazz styles. Kay One spawned five singles, including the lead single "Beauties" (姿色份子), an up-tempo, pop-rock song which criticises the beauty imperative within an Asian context. Follow-up single "The One and Only" (我歌......故我在) is a slow ballad which showcases Tse's wide vocal range.

On 23 December 2005, the album received a special re-release edition titled Kay One Plus, with a new bonus track called "Follow Me" (跟我走). The song contains folk elements and deals with her music and her fans. It topped the TVB chart and became her first number one song. In addition, the album contains two non-Cantonese songs: The One and Only, an English cover of the second single; and "Plastic Rose" (塑膠玫瑰), the Mandarin version of "Beauties".

In 2006, Tse started garnering more media attention, first losing her dental braces she had worn for many years. On 2 June, she released the EP, K sus2, which contained the first single "Gloomy Festival" (愁人節). The single received positive critical reception for raising concern about disadvantaged groups in society. It garnered a decent amount of airplay and became her first single to peak within the top 10 of all four major charts, reaching no. 1 on both the TVB and Commercial Radio charts, and winning her first year-end song award at the 2006 Ultimate Song Chart Awards.

On 12 October 2006, Tse joined major label Cinepoly Records, a decision made by Tse alongside her manager Sammy Haze and music producer Adrian Chow, on the condition that they be granted a level of artistic freedom.

=== 2007–2011: Cinepoly period ===
==== The First Day, pregnancy and hiatus (2007) ====
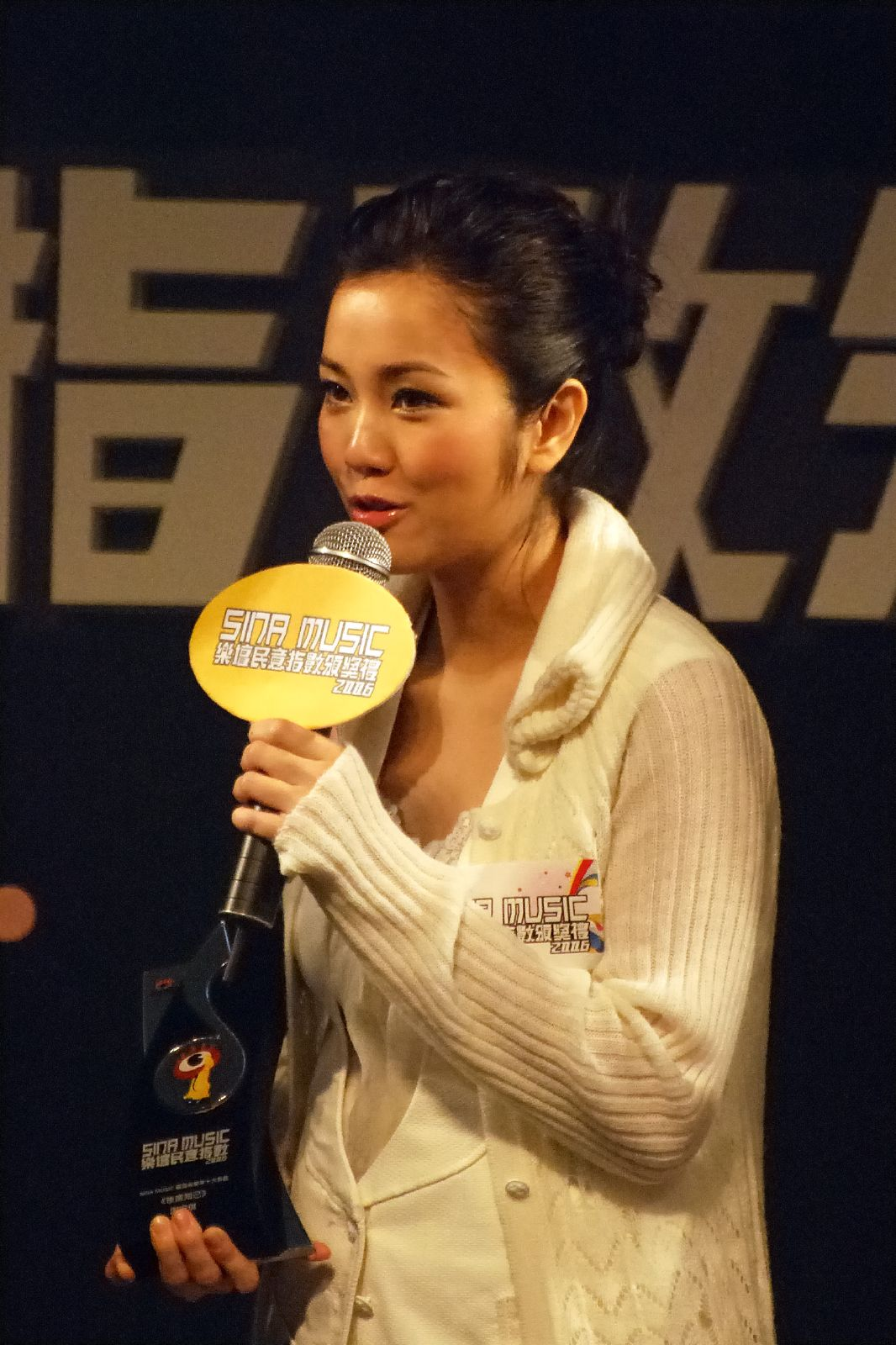
Tse performing at the Sina Awards in 2007

Shortly after signing with Cinepoly Records, Tse held a press conference on 26 November 2007 to announce that she had been three months pregnant, with plans to take a maternity leave after a farewell concert and a new album.

On 5 January 2007, Tse held her farewell concert, Kay Tse: The First Day Live, at KITEC, co-presented by Ban Ban Music and Commercial Radio Hong Kong. Labelmates Hins Cheung, Kelvin Kwan, and Wilfred Lau performed as guests. Onstage, Tse remarked that it had been exactly 2 years since she debuted her first single, "Beauties" and took the opportunity to premiere a new single, "The First Day".

The First Day was the first album Tse recorded for Cinepoly. Released on 18 January 2007, the album contained three new songs and nine newly rearranged versions of previous songs. Lead single "Problems upon Problems" (節外生枝) became Tse's most successful single at that point, reaching three of the four major singles charts. A second edition of the album was released in March, which included a bonus DVD of her farewell concert.

In late January, Tse married fellow Hong Kong songwriter and recording-artist Louis Cheung. The ceremony took place in Regal Airport Hotel near Hong Kong International Airport. She gave birth to her son on 11 December 2007.

Following the birth of her son and almost a year's hiatus from music, Tse released a new songs and greatest hits compilation, 3/8, in December 2007. The compilation's three new songs, "3/8", "Zhong Wu Yan" (鍾無艷) and "The Retired Life of Wonder Woman" (神奇女俠的退休生活) were all released as singles, with the latter two reaching number 1 on various charts. Tse explained that the album title, 3/8, refers to the eight stages of life, and the three-eights that she has traveled. This refers especially to her musical life, summing up her musical journey in the past three years.

==== "Wedding Invitation Street" and rise to prominence (2008) ====
2008 was a watershed moment for Tse's music career. Her first single of the year, "17 Degrees" (17度) topped three of the four major singles charts, with second single "Wedding Invitation Street" becoming the most well-known song of 2008 (囍帖街). "Wedding Invitation Street" was released amidst controversy over the redevelopment of Wan Chai's Lee Tung Street, from which the songs takes its title. Although appearing to be a love song about letting go on the surface, many have read it as a potent critique on the city's urban renewal plans. The song made a lasting impression on Hong Kong's collective consciousness, and marks Tse's rise to prominence as not only one of the leading female singers of Hong Kong music, but also as a socially conscious "grassroots diva".

Both "17 Degrees" and "Wedding Invitation Street" were released on the album Binary in July, to overwhelming critical and commercial success. The album was certified platinum, with sales exceeding thirty-thousand copies. Tse swept all the most prestigious year-end music awards in 2008, including the Media Grand Prize co-presented by Hong Kong's four major media outlets, awarded to the performer garnering the most awards that year.

In November, Tse was admitted to hospital for suffering from Pneumothorax, which was reportedly the fourth time the condition had occurred. This had impacted her ability to sing with Tse being hospitalised for a week.

==== Yelling and Slowness, HKRIA controversy (2009) ====
Following-up on the previous year's success, Tse released two albums, Yelling and Slowness in 2009. The former was released on 19 March, which spawned two hit singles "Zhu Ying Tai" (祝英台) and "Song of the Year" (年度之歌), further establishing her popularity. She announced her first stadium concert, Kay Tse Yelling Live 2009 in support of the album, which was held at the Hong Kong Coliseum in May. The concert later toured to Macau and Guangzhou in December, becoming her first concerts held outside of Hong Kong. In fall 2009, HMV Hong Kong announced that Yelling was the 9th biggest selling album of the year, which sold in excess of 15,000 copies, rivalling long established female acts such as Joey Yung and Miriam Yeung.

Slowness, released late in the year on 21 December, also spawned a hit lead single, "Living" (活著), which topped three of the four major singles charts. It was around this time, however, that controversy began between TVB and the Hong Kong Recording Industry Alliance, which meant that Tse, under Cinepoly, would no longer appear on TVB or have her singles chart. For that same reason, Tse did not receive any year-end awards from TVB that year, which would remain the case until she switched labels in 2012. To promote Slowness, Tse began a mini-university tour which spanned from January to March 2010.

==== Second Home and Mandarin market (2010) ====
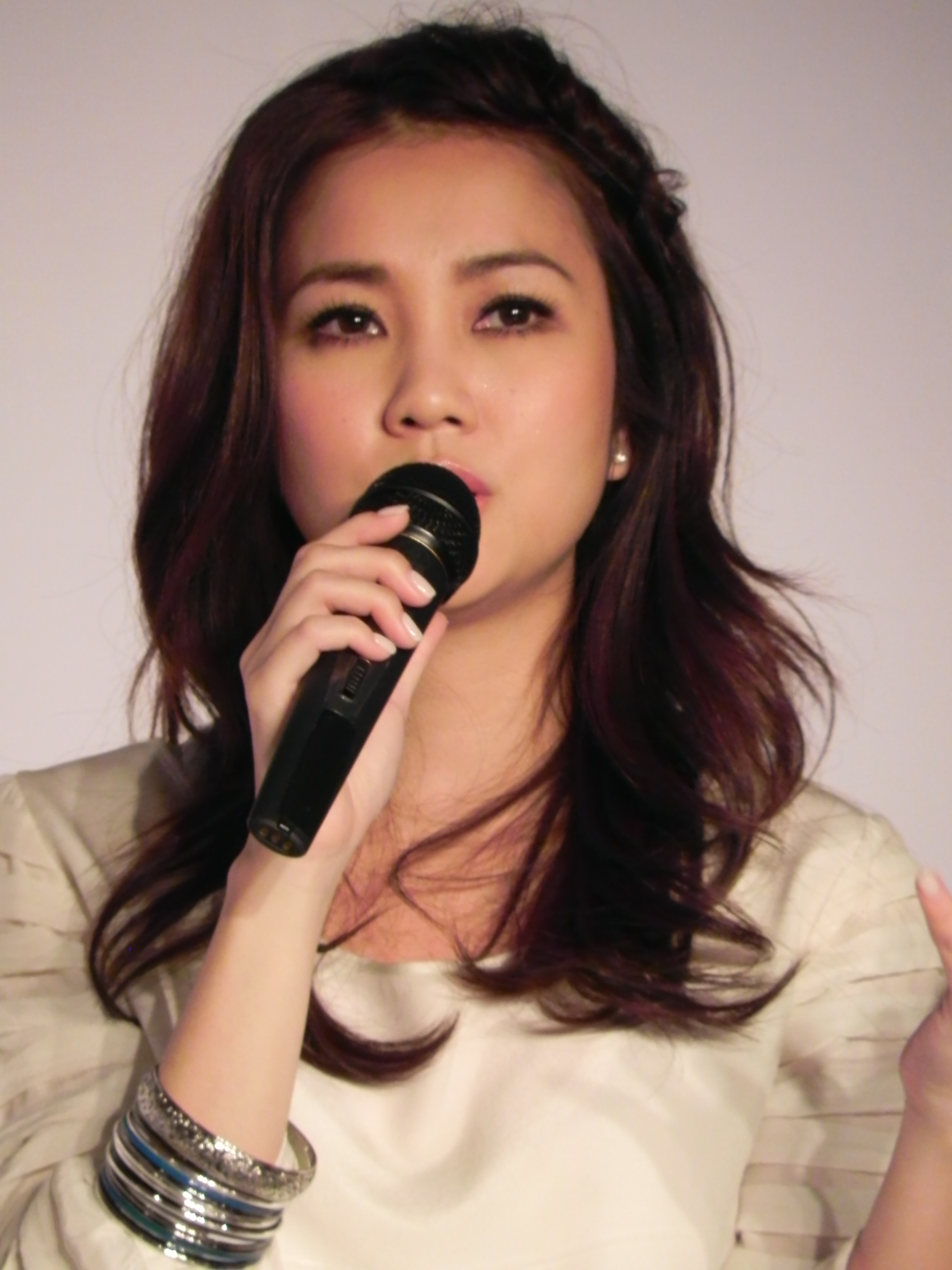
Tse in 2010

Promotion continued for Slowness for the first half of 2010, which saw three further singles that enjoyed moderate chart success. On 23 August 2010, Tse held a press conference to announce her contract renewal with Cinepoly, reportedly a seven-figure deal spanning 5 years.

In the period between 2009 and 2010, Tse had faced some major setbacks in the Hong Kong market, not least including the HKRIA controversy, which had taken away an important platform to promote herself, leading to a decline in popularity. She became frequently attacked in the media, especially by the publications Oriental Sunday and New Monday, which were owned by Emperor Entertainment Group. It is widely thought that this was a smear tactic by EEG who perceived Tse as a threat to their contracted artiste Joey Yung, an example being that in 2008, Tse had won six awards at the Commercial Radio's year-end award show to only two won by Yung. She admitted to Black Paper Magazine in 2011 that she had suffered depression during this time, though had recovered.

Having faced such setbacks, Tse set her sights in the latter part of 2010 on the Mandarin market. On 23 August, she released her first Mandarin single, "Weak" (脆弱) followed by her debut Mandarin album, Second Home (第二個家) on 5 November 2010. The second single, "Goodbye" (再見) was released to coincide with the album launch.

==== Your Happiness, label disputes (2011) ====
In May, Tse premiered the single "December 20th" (十二月二十). The single was described as "last moment on Earth [...] lyrically about the rich-poor and class divides in Hong Kong". The single garnered positive reception, with many calling the style more in line with her earlier releases. On 15 August, Tse debuted her follow-up single "Your Happiness" (你們的幸福), which became the title track of the album released on 13 October 2011.

=== 2012–2013: Label changes ===
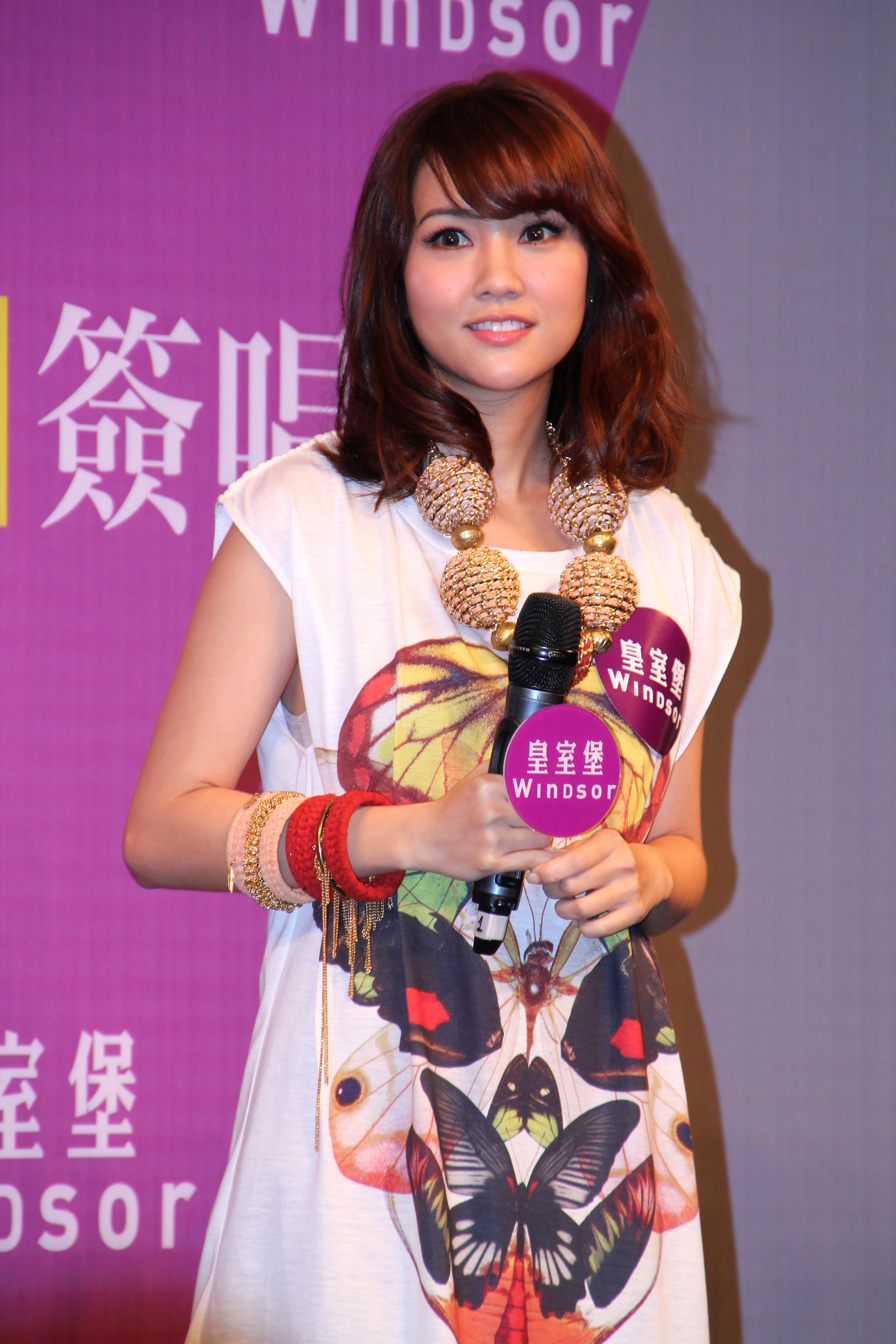
Tse in 2012

In 2012, Tse performed as a principal cast member in Loving the Silent Tears, a Broadway-style musical production at the Shrine Auditorium in Los Angeles, USA. The musical is based on a poetry collection, Silent Tears by Supreme Master Ching Hai, a Vietnamese-born spiritual leader and entrepreneur. Tse performs the song "Talking to a Stone Buddha", singing in Mandarin and English.

On 29 March 2013, Tse announced that she had signed to Gold Typhoon (Taiwan). She released the Mandarin single, "I Have A Dream" followed by the album, With Thanks – Kay in September. She briefly signed with Herman Ho's record company, Stars Shine International before it closed, releasing the Cantonese single, "The Best of Time" (最好的時刻).

=== 2014–2016: Independent period, 10th Anniversary, World Tour and second hiatus ===
==== Kontinue ====
On 30 June 2014, Kay's company released her new single Egg and Lamb. The composer and writer Adrian Chow, claimed that he was inspired by the film 12 Years a Slave. The song soon became popular as the official MV collected about one million clicks on YouTube within two weeks of its release. However, it was alleged that the new song touched on sensitive political issues between Hong Kong and Mainland China. The song and the official MV on Chinese mainstream online music players and video websites were soon deleted, respectively, on the second day since their release. Also, the name of the song was blocked when searching on websites.

On 29 September 2014, Kay released Kontinue, her first Cantonese album since 2011's Your Happiness.

In 2015, Kay began her 10th Anniversary World Tour on 10 October. In 2016, she stated she would be on hiatus for a year. The hiatus was brought forward due to her announcement of pregnancy. Also, due to the negative mood and outlook due to political and social events in Hong Kong, the World Tour was cut short.

=== 2018–present: imagine.nation period ===
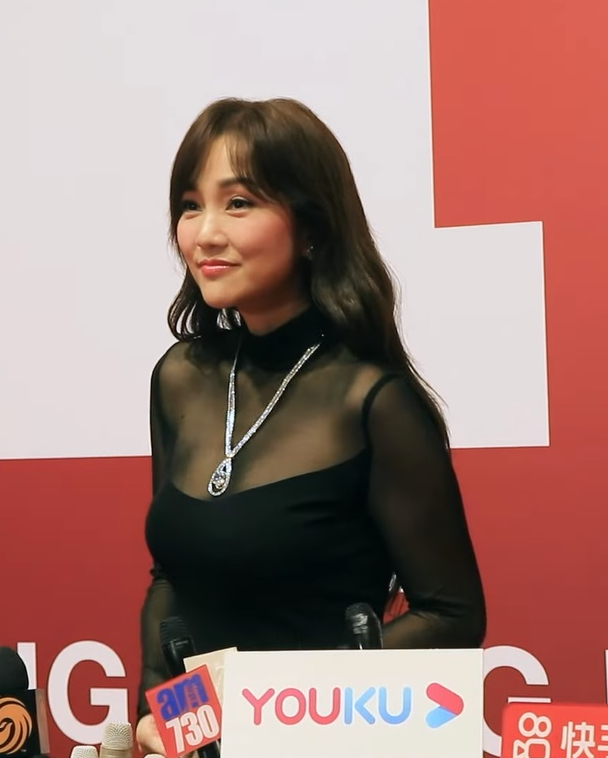
Tse in 2022

Tse's second child, Karina, was born in March 2017.

In December 2017, Tse signed with Juno Mak's label, imagine.nation, effectively marking her comeback.

Tse's first single in 2018 was the Cantonese version of the theme song to the Bollywood film Secret Superstar, released in Hong Kong on 12 April 2018. She released a collaborative EP with Juno Mak, The Album Part One in December.

In January 2022, local media reported that ten Canto-pop singers and groups had been put on a blacklist of government-funded broadcaster RTHK, with radio DJs having been ordered not to play their songs. Tse was reportedly on the list. In response to a letter by lawmaker Tik Chi-yuen requesting clarification, RTHK wrote: "RTHK has been supporting the development of Chinese pop music. Program hosts choose songs based on professionalism and suitability to the programs."

== Endorsements ==
- Sony Xperia 1 IV

== Personal life ==
Tse is married to fellow Hong Kong singer Louis Cheung, with whom she has two children. She is a long term vegetarian and recently described her diet as 99% vegan.

== Discography ==
Studio albums

- Kay One (2005)
- Ksus2 (EP) (2006)
- The First Day (2007)
- 3/8 (New + Best Selection) (2007)
- Binary (2008)
- Yelling (2009)
- Slowness (2009)
- The 2nd Home (2010)
- Your Happiness (2011)
- Kay Tse (2013)
- Kontinue (2014)
- The Album Part One (with Juno Mak; 2018)
- The Album and the Rest of It... (with Juno Mak; 2019)
- The Album and the End of It (with Juno Mak; 2020)

== Tours ==
- 2009 May 8–10, 13–16: Yelling Live 2009 (好多謝安琪吶喊演唱會2009) – 7 concerts held at the Hong Kong Coliseum. First major concert series.
- 2010 Jan 14 – 8 Feb: Slowness University Mini-Tour (謝安琪Slowness大學巡迴mini live) – 8 shows at various universities across Hong Kong, including the first-stop at Tse's alma mater.
- 2012 Jan 13–14: Your Happiness Live 2012 (謝安琪2012你們的幸福演唱會) – 2 concerts at the Hong Kong Coliseum.
- 2014 Sep 27: Kay Tse x goldEN Binary Opposition Live (謝安琪x goldEN 二元對立音樂實驗場) – 1 concert held at the MacPherson Stadium, Hong Kong. Co-headlining with label-mate goldEN.
- 2015–2016: 10th Anniversary World Tour (拾回 謝安琪 數愛世界巡迴演唱會) – 1 concert in Macau on 10 October 2015. 2 concerts at the Hong Kong Coliseum in April 2016.
- 2019 Oct 9–12: Kay...Isn't Me. Live 2019. 4 concerts at the Hong Kong Coliseum.
- 2027 –: 20th Anniversary World Tour (謝安琪 TIDAL 巡迴演唱會) – 4 concerts at the Hong Kong Coliseum.

== Filmography ==
=== Films ===
- Split Second Murders (死神傻了) (2009)
- Love Connected (保持愛你) (2009)
- Lover's Discourse (戀人絮語) (2010)
- Legend of a Rabbit (兔俠傳奇) (2011)
- Nightfall (2012)
- The Legend of Dunhuang (敦煌傳奇) (2012)
- Doomsday Party (2013)
- Band Four (2023)
- Out of the Shadow (2024)

=== TV series ===
- Come On, Cousin (2014)
- Blue Veins (2016)
- Legal Affair (2023)

=== Music video appearances ===
- Error - "Love On Duty" (愛情值日生) (2022)

== Awards ==
- 2002
  - Hong Kong University Singing Competition – 1st Place Winner
- 2005
  - Commercial Radio Hong Kong Ultimate Song Chart Awards – Best Newcomer (Bronze)
  - RTHK 28th Top 10 Gold Song Awards – Most Promising Newcomer (Merit Prize)
- 2006
  - CRHK Ultimate Song Chart Awards – Ultimate Song No. 10: "Mourners' Festival" (愁人節)
  - CASH Golden Sail Music Awards – Best Female Pop Vocal Performance: (亡命之途)
  - Jade Solid Gold Best 10 Awards Presentation – Most Popular Duet (Bronze): (滄海遺珠) with Wilfred Lau
  - Metro Radio Hit Music Awards – Hit Song: (後窗知已)
- 2007
  - CRHK Ultimate Song Chart Awards – Ultimate Female Singer (Bronze)
  - Metro Radio Hit Music Awards – Hit Song: "The First Day" (第一天)
- 2008
  - Four Stations Joint Media Awards – Artist Award (Grand Prize)
  - Four Stations Joint Media Awards – Song Award: "Wedding Invitation Street" (囍帖街)
  - Four Stations Joint Media Awards – Album Award: Binary
  - CRHK Ultimate Song Chart Awards – Ultimate Song Award: "Wedding Invitation Street" (囍帖街)
  - CRHK Ultimate Song Chart Awards – My Favourite Song: "Wedding Invitation Street" (囍帖街)
  - CRHK Ultimate Song Chart Awards – My Favourite Female Singer
  - CRHK Ultimate Song Chart Awards – Ultimate Album Award: Binary (囍帖街)
  - CRHK Ultimate Song Chart Awards – Ultimate Female Singer (Silver)
  - Jade Solid Gold Best 10 Awards Presentation – Gold Song Award: "Wedding Invitation Street" (囍帖街)
  - Jade Solid Gold Best 10 Awards Presentation – Song Award: "Wedding Invitation Street" (囍帖街)
  - RTHK 31st Top 10 Gold Song Awards – Ultimate Global Chinese Song Award: "Wedding Invitation Street" (囍帖街)
  - RTHK 31st Top 10 Gold Song Awards – Top 10 Song: "Wedding Invitation Street" (囍帖街)
  - RTHK 31st Top 10 Gold Song Awards – Outstanding Singer
  - Metro Radio Hit Music Awards – Song of the Year: "Wedding Invitation Street" (囍帖街)
  - Metro Radio Hit Music Awards – Hit Female Singer
  - Metro Radio Hit Music Awards – Most Admired Female Singer
  - Metro Radio Hit Music Awards – Most Admired Song: "Wedding Invitation Street" (囍帖街)
  - CASH Golden Sail Music Awards – Best Female Pop Vocal Performance: "17 Degrees" (17度)
  - Mingpao Magazine Entertainment Awards – Most Outstanding Female Singer: "Wedding Invitation Street" (囍帖街)
  - 9th Chinese Media Awards – Best Cantonese Female
  - 9th Chinese Media Awards – Cantonese Song of the Year: "Wedding Invitation Street" (囍帖街)
- 2009
  - CRHK Ultimate Song Chart Awards – Ultimate Female Singer (Silver)
  - CRHK Ultimate Song Chart Awards – Ultimate Song No. 8: "Song of the Year" (年度之歌)
  - RTHK 32nd Top 10 Gold Song Awards – Top 10 Song: "Song of the Year" (年度之歌)
  - RTHK 32nd Top 10 Gold Song Awards – Outstanding Singer
  - Metro Radio Hit Music Awards – Hit Female Singer
  - Metro Radio Hit Music Awards – Most Admired Female Singer
  - Metro Radio Hit Music Awards – Hit Song: "Song of the Year" (年度之歌)
  - CASH Golden Sail Music Awards – Best Female Pop Vocal Performance: "Song of the Year" (年度之歌)
- 2010
  - CRHK Ultimate Song Chart Awards – Ultimate Female Singer (Silver)
  - CRHK Ultimate Song Chart Awards – Ultimate Song No. 3: "Weak" (脆弱)
  - RTHK 33rd Top 10 Gold Song Awards – Outstanding Singer
  - RTHK 33rd Top 10 Gold Song Awards – Top 10 Song: (雨過天陰)
  - RTHK 33rd Top 10 Gold Song Awards – Outstanding Mandarin Song (Bronze): "Weak" (脆弱)
  - Metro Radio Hit Music Awards – Hit Mandarin Song: "Weak" (脆弱)
  - Metro Radio Hit Music Awards – Hit Vocal Performance
  - Metro Radio Hit Music Awards – Hit Asia Singer
- 2011
  - CRHK Ultimate Song Chart Awards – Ultimate Female Singer (Silver)
  - RTHK 34th Top 10 Gold Song Awards – Outstanding Singer
  - RTHK 34th Top 10 Gold Song Awards – Top 10 Song: "Your Happiness" (你們的幸福)
  - Metro Radio Hit Music Awards – Hit Asia Singer
  - Metro Radio Hit Music Awards – Most Admired Song: "Your Happiness" (你們的幸福)
  - CASH Golden Sail Music Awards – Best Female Pop Vocal Performance: "Your Happiness" (你們的幸福)
- 2012
  - RTHK 35th Top 10 Gold Song Awards – Outstanding Singer
  - Metro Radio Hit Music Awards – Hit Asia Singer
  - Metro Radio Hit Music Awards – Most Admired Female Singer
  - Metro Radio Hit Music Awards – Hit Karaoke Song: (臨崖勒馬)
- 2013
  - RTHK 36th Top 10 Gold Song Awards – Outstanding Singer
  - RTHK 36th Top 10 Gold Song Awards – Top 10 Song: "The Best of Time" (最好的時刻)
  - Jade Solid Gold Best 10 Awards Presentation – Song Award: "The Best of Time" (最好的時刻)
  - Metro Radio Hit Music Awards – Singer of the Year
  - Metro Radio Hit Music Awards – Hit Song: "The Best of Time" (最好的時刻)
  - Metro Radio Hit Music Awards – Nationwide Fan-Voted Singer Award
- 2014
  - CRHK Ultimate Song Chart Awards – Ultimate Song No. 6: "Lone Village" (獨家村)
  - CRHK Ultimate Song Chart Awards – My Favourite Female Singer
  - CRHK Ultimate Song Chart Awards – My Favourite Song: "Raise the Umbrella" (撐起雨傘) shared with various artists
  - RTHK 37th Top 10 Gold Song Awards – Ultimate Global Chinese Song Award: "Lone Village" (獨家村)
  - RTHK 37th Top 10 Gold Song Awards – Outstanding Singer
  - RTHK 37th Top 10 Gold Song Awards – Top 10 Song: "Lone Village" (獨家村)
  - Jade Solid Gold Best 10 Awards Presentation – Song Award: (勢不兩立)
  - Jade Solid Gold Best 10 Awards Presentation – Song Award: "Lone Village" (獨家村)
  - Metro Radio Hit Music Awards – Hit Song: "Lone Village" (獨家村)
  - Metro Radio Hit Music Awards – Hit Album of the Year: Kontinue
  - Metro Radio Hit Music Awards – Hit Asia Singer
  - Metro Radio Hit Music Awards – Hit Nationwide Singer
  - CASH Golden Sail Music Awards – Best Mandarin Pop Song: "The Name of Tears" (眼淚的名字)
  - 15th Chinese Music Media Awards – Best Cantonese Female
  - 15th Chinese Music Media Awards – Cantonese Album of the Year
- 2015
  - CRHK Ultimate Song Chart Awards – My Favourite Female Singer
  - CRHK Ultimate Song Chart Awards – Ultimate Song No. 6: "Rashomon" (羅生門) with Juno Mak
  - CRHK Ultimate Song Chart Awards – Ultimate Female Singer (Bronze)
  - RTHK 38th Top 10 Gold Song Awards – Ultimate Global Chinese Song Award: "Rashomon" (羅生門) with Juno Mak
  - RTHK 38th Top 10 Gold Song Awards – Top 10 Song: "Rashomon" (羅生門) with Juno Mak
  - RTHK 38th Top 10 Gold Song Awards – Outstanding Singer
  - RTHK 38th Top 10 Gold Song Awards – Outstanding Mandarin Song (Silver): "Following the Trail of Tears" (跟着眼淚轉彎)
  - CASH Golden Sail Music Awards – Best Song (Grand Prize): "Rashomon" (羅生門) with Juno Mak
  - CASH Golden Sail Music Awards – Best Female Pop Vocal Performance: "Lone Village" (獨家村)
  - Metro Radio Hit Music Awards – Hit Global Singer
  - Metro Radio Hit Music Awards – Hit Nationwide Singer
  - Metro Radio Hit Music Awards – Hit Song: "Following the Trail of Tears" (跟着眼淚轉彎)
  - Metro Radio Hit Music Awards – Hit Mandarin Song (Gold): "Fragrant Woman" (香女人)
- 2016
  - CASH Golden Sail Music Awards – Best Song (Grand Prize): "Hillwood Road" (山林道)
- 2022
  - CRHK Ultimate Song Chart Awards – Ultimate Song No. 5: "憶年"
