= Revenge: A Love Story =

2010 Hong Kong film by Wong Ching-po

- Film poster
- Traditional Chinese: 復仇者之死
- Simplified Chinese: 复仇者之死
- Literal meaning: The Death of an Avenger
- Hanyu Pinyin: Fùchóu zhě zhī sǐ
- Yale Romanization: Fuhksàuh jé zī séi
- Jyutping: fuk6sau4 ze2 zi1 sei2
- Directed by: Wong Ching-Po
- Screenplay by: Wong Ching-Po
- Produced by: Conroy Chi-Chung Chan
- Starring: Juno Mak; Sola Aoi
- Cinematography: Jimmy Wong
- Edited by: Cheung Ka-fai; Wong Ching-Po
- Music by: Dan Findlay
- Production company: 852 Films
- Distributed by: Lark Films Distribution
- Release date: 2 December 2010 (Hong Kong)
- Running time: 111 minutes
- Country: Hong Kong
- Language: Cantonese

Revenge: A Love Story (復仇者之死) is a 2010 Hong Kong crime horror film written and directed by Wong Ching-Po.

== Cast ==
- Juno Mak as Chan Kit (陳杰; 陈杰; can4 git6; Chén Jié)
- Sola Aoi as Cheung Wing (張穎; 张颖; zoeng1 wing6; Zhāng Yǐng)
- Candy Cheung as Ling
- Chin Siu-ho
- Tony Ho
- Tony Liu

== Reception ==
Catherine Shoard in The Guardian called it a "baffling, grotesque horror that fails to validate its shocks" and gave it one star.
