= Big Tits Zombie =

- Cover to the Japanese DVD release of Big Tits Zombie (2010)
- Directed by: Takao Nakano
- Written by: Takao Nakano
- Produced by: Seiji Minami; Hideaki Nishiyama
- Starring: Sola Aoi; Risa Kasumi; Mari Sakurai
- Cinematography: Kazuaki Yoshizawa
- Production company: TMC (Total Media Corporation)
- Distributed by: TMC (Total Media Corporation)
- Release date: May 15, 2010
- Running time: 73 minutes
- Country: Japan
- Language: Japanese

Big Tits Zombie (巨乳ドラゴン 温泉ゾンビVSストリッパー5, Kyonyū doragon: Onsen zonbi vs sutorippaa 5; lit. "Big Tits Dragon: Hot Spring Zombie Vs. Stripper 5") is a 2010 Japanese fantasy-horror comedy film. It was adapted from the manga Kyonyū Dragon by Rei Mikamoto, and stars several known faces from Japan's adult movie industry, most notably Sola Aoi. It is directed by Japanese satirist Takao Nakano and much of the action is shot in 3D. The film is said to be an ironic take on Japanese pop culture.

== Plot ==
Ginko and Lena work at an unsuccessful strip club called Paradise Ikagawa Theatre with several other strippers, including Nene; Maria, an intelligent, red-headed gothic bookworm with a penchant for self mutilation; Lena, a fortune-teller; and Darna, who is raising money to see her siblings. Explaining how she became a stripper, Lena says that after returning from Mexico in desperate need of cash, she got drunk and slept with a homeless man instead of finding work. Hungover and disgusted, Lena steals his umbrella and leaves.

Lena receives a phone call from Manjiro, a deadbeat Ikagawa Promotions manager. Manjiro informs Lena Ginko got arrested recently, and he needs a dancer to perform for ten days. Lena reluctantly accepts. Lena meets up with Yudai, an employee of the strip club. Yudai tells Lena about a man whose unsuccessful attempt to build a spa resort next to the strip club led his family to commit suicide. Yudai informs them that the theatre will be closed tomorrow. After trying to lie his way out of paying them, Manjiro agrees to pay for the gig and offers them a strip show gig at a spa resort.

At the spa resort, a spa worker tells them that sex trade workers must come through the back door. Ginko says they are dancers, not strippers or prostitutes. The group performs a show for one of the spa attendees. The lead attendee insists on a sumo wrestling match between Lena and Ginko. Lena wins a cash prize, and Ginko is reluctantly forced to become a human sushi bar. Lena ends up unintentionally sleeping with the lead spa attendee after getting drunk.

Ginko becomes angry with Lena's habit of sleeping with men when drunk, and the two of them fight, ripping each other's shirts off and knocking down a stack of boxes. While cleaning up, Maria discovers a door leading to an underground cellar. The strippers discover the former owner had a collection of occult books and a strange, sealed-off well called the Well of Spirits. Darna finds a hidden stash of yen bills, and, Maria finds a medieval Book of the Dead. Believing she can use the book to perform necromancy, Maria chants several spells, which do not seem to work. Disappointed, Maria and the other girls leave the basement.

While preparing dinner, Ginko and Nene discover that the spell worked and has caused all types of deceased life, including raw fish and sushi, to return from the dead and terrorize Ikagawa. Darna sneaks into the cellar where she saw the money. She discovers a zombie is hidden underneath the pile of cash and is torn to pieces.

Back in the dressing room, Ginko and Nene inform Lena and Maria about the zombie sushi incident but are interrupted when they hear of a large audience outside. The audience is revealed to be zombies who have recently killed Yudai. The zombies attack them, and, although Nene is bitten, she escapes with Maria, Ginko and Lena. The zombies continue to emerge from the well and slaughter the citizens of Ikagawa, eventually spreading over Japan in a manner of seconds according to a reporter who is soon devoured. Although sharing the basic characteristics of infectious zombies, the zombies still retain their intelligence and intellect they had prior to being zombified.

While cornered in the dressing room, Maria betrays Lena, Nene, and Ginko and escapes. The three escape in the Ikagawa Paradise Theatre van, eventually driving to the spa resort. The van is ruined when running over an elderly human. Ginko recognizes a one eyed zombie among the crowd as having killed Ginko's younger sister. He could not be touched legally due to being insane. Ginko kills the man by impaling him on an umbrella.

Meanwhile, Maria returns to the abandoned spa's basement, where she discovers the mutilated remains of Darna. The zombies attempt to kill Maria, who bribes them with flashing and candy. When these attempts fail, Maria chants a spell from the Book of the Dead and controls them.

== Cast ==
- Sola Aoi as Rena Jodo
- Risa Kasumi as Ginko
- Mari Sakurai as Maria
- Tamayo as Nene
- Io Aikawa as Darna
- Minoru Torihada as Blue Ogre
- Saori Andô

== Release ==
The film opened on 15 May 2010, in Japan, and was released on DVD on 14 August. Big Tits Zombie 3D was released in some cinemas in the UK in October 2010 by Terracotta Distribution. The DVD followed in November.

== Reception ==
The film was critically panned by critics by the time of its release. Duane Byrge of The Hollywood Reporter wrote, "Although the narrative is as minimalist as the wardrobes, screenwriter-director Takao Nakano has heaved in some brainy wit amid a cornucopia of gore and flesh." Scott Foy of Dread Central rated it 1/5 stars and wrote, "The whole sorry spectacle is really more like an endless stream of non sequiturs that rarely amount to anything beyond inane gibberish." Ard Vijn of Twitch Film wrote, "There are a few half-good jokes in there and the film never drags, but it also never rises above the barest (haha) (sic) expectations you'd get from the title." Ben Bussey of Brutal as Hell wrote, "[I]f you're after a quick blast of something silly, splattery and sexy, then Big Tits Zombie may well be to your liking." James Mudge of Beyond Hollywood wrote, "Takao Nakano certainly knows what the fans want, and serves up gore, imaginative splatter gags, surreal humour and bare breasts in equal measure, most of which are pretty entertaining, if often baffling and random." Gordon Sullivan of DVD Verdict recommended the film to people enticed by the title, but said that others probably would not enjoy it. Writing in The Zombie Movie Encyclopedia, Volume 2, academic Peter Dendle called it "a clever parody of Japanese trash cinema".
