= Let's Go! (film) =

2011 Hong Kong film by Wong Ching-po

- Film poster
- 保衞戰隊之出動喇！朋友！
- Directed by: Wong Ching-po
- Written by: Simon Lai; Yan Pak-wing
- Produced by: Steven Hon Keung Lo; Juno Mak
- Starring: Juno Mak; Stephy Tang
- Cinematography: Jimmy Wong
- Edited by: Cheung Ka-fai; Wong Ching-po
- Music by: Raymond Wong
- Production companies: Grand Fame Creation; Kudos Films
- Distributed by: Distribution Workshop
- Release date: 10 November 2011
- Running time: 96 minutes
- Country: Hong Kong
- Language: Cantonese

Let's Go! (Chinese: 保衞戰隊之出動喇！朋友！) is a 2011 Hong Kong action film directed by Wong Ching-po. It screened at the 2011 Hong Kong Asian Film Festival.

== Plot ==
Siu Sheung (Juno Mak) is a solitary and frustrated young man. He works as a delivery boy at a small noodle shop and lives with his mother (Pat Ha) in a large, dilapidated Kowloon housing estate. As a young boy he enjoyed nothing more than watching his favourite anime, Space Emperor God Sigma, and singing along to Leslie Cheung's theme song with his father. However, after seeing his dad shot dead trying to apprehend a bank robber, Siu Sheung has spent the last twenty years wandering aimlessly, looking for a way to bring justice back to the community.

A local gangster, Shing (Gordon Lam), impressed by Siu Sheung's fighting skills, recruits him into his gang, part of the impressive Matsumoto syndicate, run by Boss Hon Yu (Jimmy Wang Yu). Desperate for the money, Siu Sheung takes the job and soon finds himself working as personal bodyguard to Hon Yu's beautiful yet feisty daughter, Annie (Stephy Tang). When Shing embarks on a violent coup to overthrow Hon Yu, Siu Sheung is forced into action, not only to protect Annie, but to defeat evil and restore peace and harmony to the community.

== Cast ==
- Juno Mak as Lee Siu Sheung
- Stephy Tang as Annie
- Ka-Tung Lam as Shing
- Gary Chaw as But Ching Mo's son
- Patricia Ha as Sheung's mother
- Jimmy Wang Yu as Mr. Hon Yu (as Yu Wang)
