= Slow learner (disambiguation) =

A slow learner is someone who has difficulty learning.

Slow learner may also refer to:

== Media ==
- Slow Learner, a collection of short stories by Thomas Pynchon (1984)
- "Slow Learner", a song by Joe Morris from Sweatshop (1990)
- Slow Learners, an American romantic comedy film (2015)

== See also ==
- Slow (disambiguation)
- Learn (disambiguation)
