= Learn (disambiguation) =

To learn is the act of acquiring knowledge.

Learn may also refer to:

- Labor Education and Research Network
- Ed Learn (born 1937), a Canadian football defensive back
- Learn: The Songs of Phil Ochs, a 2006 folk album
- Learn.com, a software company
- Lanka Education and Research Network

== See also ==
- LEARN (disambiguation)
- Slow learner (disambiguation)
