= Sloughing (disambiguation) =

Sloughing may refer to:

- Sloughing, in biology, shedding or casting off dead tissue
  - Skin sloughing, shedding dead surface cells off the skin
- Soil sloughing, a type of soil behavior
- Sloughing (biofilms), shedding of the biofilm in certain wastewater treatment units, particularly trickling filters and rotating biological contactors.

== See also ==
- Slough (disambiguation)
