= Slower =

A slower or a retarder is something that reduces speed or activity. It can also be:

- Slow motion, an effect by displaying normally recorded footage at a slower speed
- Slower ball is, in cricket, a slower-than-usual delivery from a fast bowler
- Zeeman slower, an experimental device that cools atoms
- "Slower" (Tate McRae song), 2021
- "Slower", a 2012 song by Brandy from Two Eleven

== See also ==
- Slow
- Slower Than Church Music, a 2002 album by American electronic music group Freescha;
- A Slower Speed of Light, a 2012 freeware video game developed by MIT Game Lab;
- Slower Speeds Initiative, a coalition "to raise awareness of the consequences of inappropriate speeds"
