= Slowness (album) =

Studio album by Kay Tse
- Released: 21 December 2009
- Recorded: May–September 2009
- Genre: Cantopop
- Label: Cinepoly
- Producer: Adrian Chow

Kay Tse chronology
Yelling (2009)	Slowness (2009)	My Second Home (2010)

Slowness is the seventh studio album by Hong Kong recording artist Kay Tse. It was released on 21 December 2009, by Cinepoly Records. The theme of the album is slowness, pointing out how life in urban cities is becoming increasingly restless and fast-paced. Tse worked with several producers on this album, most notably her frequent collaborator, the songwriter Adrian Chow. He is also the executive producer for the album. Musically, the album consists of slow-tempo cantopop while incorporating jazz elements.

The first single from Slowness, "Living" <<活著>>, was a critical success, which reached number one in three of the four major charts of Hong Kong. Three more singles were released which received moderate success. Tse promoted the album by promoting the songs in a number of live appearances, including a mini-concert series.

== Track listing ==
次序	歌名	作曲	填詞	編曲	監製
1.	活著	徐偉賢	周博賢	周博賢	周博賢
2.	雨過天陰	徐偉賢	周博賢	Cousin Fung	周博賢
3.	寬限期	Leona Chan	周博賢	周博賢	周博賢
4.	衣帽間	天旋	周博賢	周博賢	周博賢
5.	替你高興	John Laudon	周博賢	John Laudon	周博賢
6.	載我走	楊淽,葉秀雯	周博賢	Gary Tong	梁榮駿
7.	藝妓回憶錄	英師傅	周博賢	英師傅	英師傅
8.	最後晚餐	英師傅	周博賢	英師傅	英師傅
9.	身體髮膚	周博賢	周博賢	周博賢	周博賢
10.	賴床	Seasons Lee	周博賢	Seasons Lee	周博賢

== Singles ==
Single	903	TVB	997	RTHK
Living <<活著>>	1	3	1	1
Memoirs of a Geisha <<藝妓回憶錄>>	1	^	2	5
The Overcast After Rain <<雨過天陰>>	7	^	2	1
Take Me Away <<載我走>>	-	^	-	13

^ Single was unable to chart due to disagreement between Universal Music Group and TVB
