= Fu Bo (film) =

2003 Hong Kong film by Wong Ching-po

- DVD cover
- Traditional Chinese: 福伯
- Simplified Chinese: 福伯
- Hanyu Pinyin: Fú Bó
- Jyutping: Fuk1 Baak3
- Directed by: Wong Ching Po
- Written by: Simon Lai Tak-Kin
- Produced by: Yip Wai-Shan; Sandy Yip
- Starring: Eric Tsang; Anthony Wong; Liu Kai-Chi; Johnson Lee; Pauline Suen
- Cinematography: Wong Ching Po
- Edited by: Wong Ching Po; Lee Kung Lok
- Music by: Tommy Wai Kai-Leung
- Distributed by: Ying E Chi (Hong Kong)
- Release date: 18 September 2003
- Running time: 111 minutes
- Country: Hong Kong
- Language: Cantonese

Fu Bo is a 2003 Hong Kong film directed by Wong Ching Po.

== Cast ==
- Eric Tsang
- Anthony Wong Chau Sang
- Liu Kai-Chi
- Johnson Lee
- Pauline Suen

== Crew ==
- Wong Ching Po - director
- Yip Wai-Shan - producer
- Sandy Yip - producer
- Lee Kung Lok, Wong Ching Po - editor
- Wong Ping-Hung - cinematographer

== Tagline ==
- "Don't ask questions, just breathe."
