= Labor Education and Research Network =

- Abbreviation: LEARN
- Established: October 1986; 39 years ago
- Type: NGO
- Headquarters: 94 Scout Delgado Street; Barangay Laging Handa; Quezon City 1103
- Location: Philippines
- Coordinates: 14.6302388°N 121.030557°E
- Origins: People Power Revolution
- Methods: Worker education
- Fields: Labor studies, civil society
- Publication: Labor Outlook
- Subsidiaries: LEARN Institute for Cooperative Development (LEARN ICD)
- Website: learn.org.ph

The Labor Education and Research Network (LEARN) is an NGO or non-government organization in the Philippines that provides various services primarily to workers, both from the private and public sectors or formal and informal labor. Its core programs are education, research, publications, women or gender, solidarity and networking.

LEARN was established in October 1986, about eight months after the People Power Revolution. Its founders were leaders of different trade unions outside the then mainstream labor organizations and major political or ideological blocs. They called for genuine workers' empowerment by developing an alternative workers' education that blends the economic, political and socio-cultural struggles of the workers; propagates an alternative socialist system; and is guided by the basic principles of trade union solidarity, democracy, self-reliance and autonomy.

LEARN stresses the principal role of workers' education to raise workers' consciousness of their conditions, rights and capabilities to change that condition. LEARN affirms that labor education is an integral component of strengthening workers solidarity in trade unions, civil society groups and with other social movements. LEARN upholds the belief that labor organizing and education are inseparable and must continuously be developed, especially in the light of the new arena of struggle confronting the workers and other basic sectors throughout the world.

LEARN supports global efforts to strengthen the diverse social movements or civil society organizations particularly the broad labor movement including the new forms of workers' organizations encompassing the formal and informal sectors as well as new strategies of actions to attain a socially just, equitable, democratic, and peaceful world.
