= 3/8 (album) =

Greatest hits album by Kay Tse
- Released: 14 December 2007
- Genre: Cantopop/Rock/Jazz
- Label: Cinepoly

Kay Tse chronology
The First Day (2006)	3/8 (2007)	Binary (2008)

3/8 is the fourth studio album by Hong Kong singer Kay Tse, released on 14 December 2007. It contains three new songs and 15 of her greatest hits.

== Track listing ==
No.	Title	English translation	Length
1.	"3/8"		3:46
2.	"鍾無艷"	Wu yen	4:36
3.	"神奇女俠的退休生活"	Retirement of a Wonderwoman	5:13
4.	"姿色份子"	Price of Beauty	4:21
5.	"喪婆"	Crazy Grandmother	3:44
6.	"我歌... 故我在"	My Song...My Life	4:16
7.	"開卷快樂"	Open and Be Happy	4:31
8.	"悟入歧途"	The Wrong Path	3:27
9.	"臭男人"	Ugly Men	4:04
10.	"塑膠玫瑰"	Plastic Roses	4:21
11.	"一人之夏"	One Person's Summer	1:59
12.	"跟我走"	Away with Me	3:41
13.	"菲情歌"	Not a Love Song	3:31
14.	"愁人節"	Miserable Fest	4:32
15.	"亡命之途"	Life on the Line	4:30
16.	"我愛茶餐廳"	I Love the Canteen	4:19
17.	"滄海遺珠" (singing with Wilfred Lau)	Recovering the Pearl	3:54
18.	"亡命之途"	Life on the Line (4am Electro Mix)	5:22
