= The First Day (Kay Tse album) =

Studio album by Kay Tse
- Released: 18 January 2007
- Genre: Cantopop/Rock/Jazz
- Label: Cinepoly
- Producer: Adrian Chou

Kay Tse chronology
K sus2 (2006)	The First Day (2007)	3/8 (2007)

The First Day is the third album by Hong Kong singer Kay Tse, released on 18 January 2007. It contains three new songs and nine remastered tracks. On 1 March 2007, it was re-released as The First Day (2nd Edition), including a bonus DVD of Kay Tse's The First Day concert footage.

== Track listing ==
1. 第一天
2. 姿色份子n (remastered version of 姿色份子)
3. The ROne & BOnly (remastered version of The One & Only)
4. 臭伉儷 (remastered version of 臭男人)
5. 跟我走這世界 (remastered version of 跟我走)
6. 後窗知己
7. 悟入迷途 (remastered version of 悟入歧途)
8. 飛情歌 (remastered version of 菲情歌)
9. 我愛茶舞廳 (remastered version of 我愛茶餐廳)
10. 開卷の樂 (remastered version of 開卷快樂)
11. 一人之盛夏 (remastered version of 一人之夏)
12. 節外生枝
