= Wong Ching-po =

Hong Kong film director (born 1973)

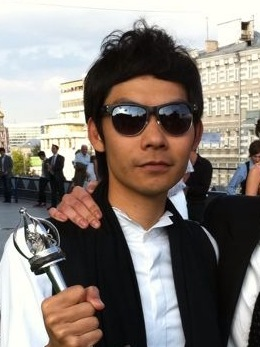
- Born: 1973 (age 52–53)
- Occupation: Film director

Chinese name
- Chinese: 黃精甫
- Hanyu Pinyin: Huáng Jīngfǔ

Wong Ching-Po (Chinese: 黃精甫; born 1973) is a Hong Kong film director. He is known for directing movies such as Pandora's Box and Once Upon a Time in Shanghai.

== Filmography ==
- Fu bo (2003)
- Jiang Hu (2004)
- Mob Sister (2005)
- A Decade of Love (2008)
- Revenge: A Love Story (2010)
- Let's Go! (2011)
- Once Upon a Time in Shanghai (2014)
- Pandora's Box 2021 (2021; 天目危机)
- The Pig, The Snake and The Pigeon (2023)

== Accolades ==
Year	Award	Category	Recipient	Result	Notes
2023	60th Golden Horse Awards	Best Director	The Pig, the Snake and the Pigeon	Nominated	
2023	60th Golden Horse Awards	Best Film Editing	The Pig, the Snake and the Pigeon	Nominated	
2024	5th Taiwan Film Critics Society Awards	Best Screenplay	The Pig, the Snake and the Pigeon	Nominated	
2024	26th Taipei Film Awards	Best Director	The Pig, the Snake and the Pigeon	Nominated	
2024	26th Taipei Film Awards	Best Screenplay	The Pig, the Snake and the Pigeon	Nominated	
