= Slough (disambiguation) =

Slough is a town in Berkshire, England.

Slough or sluff (alternate spelling) may also refer to:

== People ==
- Alan Slough (1947–2021), English footballer
- John P. Slough (1829–1867), American politician and general
- James Slough Zerbe (1849–1921), American inventor, early airplane designer

== Places ==
- Borough of Slough, a unitary district of Berkshire, England
- Slough railway station, Berkshire, England
- Slough (UK Parliament constituency), House of Commons constituency for the Borough of Slough
- Slough Stadium, Berkshire, England
- Slough, Powys, a location in Wales

== Games and sports ==
- Slough, a term in water polo
- Slough/sluff, a term in the card game Spades (card game)
- Slough, a term in card game Ruff

== Other uses ==
- Slough (hydrology), a wetland, often a backwater to a larger body of water
- "Slough" (poem), a 1937 poem by Sir John Betjeman
- Slough, the result of sloughing, shedding or casting off dead tissue
- Sluff, a nickname of the 166th Air Refueling Squadron
- Sluff, a minor avalanche, sometimes triggered in snow sports such as skiing or snowboarding
- SLUFF, a 2018 album by U.S. rock band Naked Giants

== See also ==
- Sloughi, a breed of dog
- Slew (disambiguation)
- Sloughing (disambiguation)
