= Tora-san's Tropical Fever =

- Theatrical poster
- Directed by: Yoji Yamada
- Written by: Yoji Yamada; Yoshitaka Asama
- Starring: Kiyoshi Atsumi; Ruriko Asaoka
- Cinematography: Tetsuo Takaba
- Edited by: Iwao Ishii
- Music by: Naozumi Yamamoto
- Distributed by: Shochiku
- Release date: August 2, 1980
- Running time: 104 minutes
- Country: Japan
- Language: Japanese

Tora-san's Tropical Fever (男はつらいよ 寅次郎ハイビスカスの花, Otoko wa Tsurai yo: Torajirō Haibisukasu no Hana) aka Torasan Goes to Hisbiscus Land is a 1980 Japanese comedy film directed by Yoji Yamada. It stars Kiyoshi Atsumi as Torajirō Kuruma (Tora-san), and Ruriko Asaoka as his love interest or "Madonna". Tora's Tropical Fever is the twenty-fifth entry in the popular, long-running Otoko wa Tsurai yo series.

Shochiku theatrically released a Special Edition version to theaters in 1997. It used computer graphics to add Hidetaka Yoshioka (who played Tora-san's nephew in the later films) to the story in added scenes.

== Plot ==
Lily, the lounge singer with whom Tora-san fell in love in film 11 (Tora-san's Forget Me Not, 1973) and film 15 (Tora-san's Rise and Fall, 1975) sends Tora-san a letter informing him that she is terminally ill. Tora-san rushes to Okinawa—taking his first plane trip in the process—to be at her side and nurse her to health.

== Cast ==
- Kiyoshi Atsumi as Torajirō
- Chieko Baisho as Sakura
- Ruriko Asaoka as Lily
- Masami Shimojō as Kuruma Tatsuzō
- Chieko Misaki as Tsune Kuruma (Torajiro's aunt)
- Gin Maeda as Hiroshi Suwa
- Hisao Dazai as Boss (Umetarō Katsura)
- Hayato Nakamura as Mitsuo Suwa
- Gajirō Satō as Genkō
- Suzuko Aragaki as Kaori Yamazato

== Critical appraisal ==
Writer-director Yoji Yamada reportedly considers Tora's Tropical Fever his own favorite of the Otoko wa Tsurai yo series films. The Japan Academy awarded Yamada and co-writer Yoshitaka Asama Best Screenplay for the film. Chieko Baisho was also given the Best Actress award, and Kiyoshi Atsumi was nominated for Best Actor at the ceremony. The German-language site molodezhnaja gives Tora's Tropical Fever four out of five stars, naming it one of the highlights of the series. Stuart Galbraith IV judges the film "one of the best of the series", and a "delight in every respect: it's funny, sad, and perceptive about human nature".

== Availability ==
Tora-san's Tropical Fever was released theatrically on August 2, 1980. In Japan, the film was released on videotape in 1996 and 1998, and in DVD format in 2008.

== Bibliography ==
=== English ===
- "OTOKO WA TSURAI YO TORAJIRO HIBISCUS NO HANA (1980)". British Film Institute. Archived from the original on 2012-10-17.
- "OTOKO WA TSURAIYO -TORAJIRO HAIBISUKASU NO HANA". Complete Index to World Film.
- Otoko wa tsurai yo: Torajiro haibisukasu no hana (1980) at IMDb
- Otoko wa tsurai yo: Torajiro haibisukasu no hana tokubetsu-hen (1997) at IMDb
- Galbraith IV, Stuart (2006-02-24). "Tora-san 25: Tora-san's Tropical Fever (Region 3)". DVD Talk.

=== German ===
- "Tora-San's Tropical Fever" (in German). www.molodezhnaja.ch.

=== Japanese ===
- 男はつらいよ 寅次郎ハイビスカスの花 (1980) (in Japanese). allcinema.net.
- "男はつらいよ 寅次郎ハイビスカスの花". Japanese Cinema Database (Agency for Cultural Affairs). Archived from the original on 2014-02-02.
- 男はつらいよ 寅次郎ハイビスカスの花 (in Japanese). Japanese Movie Database.
- 男はつらいよ 寅次郎ハイビスカスの花 (in Japanese). Kinema Junpo. Archived from the original on 2012-03-09.
