= Tora-san's Grand Scheme =

- Theatrical poster
- Directed by: Shun'ichi Kobayashi
- Written by: Yoji Yamada; Akira Miyazaki
- Starring: Kiyoshi Atsumi; Komaki Kurihara
- Cinematography: Tetsuo Takaba
- Edited by: Iwao Ishii
- Music by: Naozumi Yamamoto
- Distributed by: Shochiku
- Release date: February 27, 1970
- Running time: 92 minutes
- Country: Japan
- Language: Japanese

Tora-san's Grand Scheme (新・男はつらいよ, Shin Otoko wa Tsurai yo) is a 1970 Japanese comedy film directed by Shun'ichi Kobayashi. It stars Kiyoshi Atsumi as Kuruma Torajirō (Tora-san), and Komaki Kurihara as his love interest or "Madonna". Tora-san's Grand Scheme is the fourth entry in the popular, long-running Otoko wa Tsurai yo series.

== Plot ==
In his travels, Torajiro ("Tora") stops by at a tea shop where an old woman receives an electric heater from her grandson.

Seeing this scene, Tora also decides that he wanted to do a favor for his aunt and uncle. As a result, he goes to a horse track in Nagoya, gambles, and wins. Having a 1 million ¥ reward, he comes back to Toraya. As a gift for his aunt and uncle, Tora decides to use the money to go to Hawaii. Unfortunately, when Noboru (Tora's best friend)'s manager, who was supposed to negotiate with the travel agency, makes off with his money, the trip is forcefully cancelled.

Not wanting to spread the word to the nearby neighbors, Tora and his family try to hide in secret. However, a robber coming into Toraya results in the neighbors finding out about the incident. This results in a verbal argument that causes Tora to leave the house.

A month passes. Tora comes back only to find that his room has been rented. Though Tora tries to leave at first, he finds out that the room had been rented by a kindergarten teacher named Haruko. Falling in love, Tora spends time with Haruko, even coming to the kindergarten to spend time with Haruko (and the kids).

However, Haruko's father (whom she did not get along with) dies. This makes Haruko closer to Tora, as Gozen-sama reveals that Tora and his father's relationships were similar. She cries during the sutra reading of Tora's father's death anniversary, feeling the connections to Tora.

The two continue to be together, but trouble arises as Haruko's lover Mr. Aizawa comes to Toraya. When Tora comes back, he sees the two together and storms out of the house in a terrible mood. Coming back to Toraya, he visits the house and says to his aunt and uncle that he would be embarking on a trip again.

Though people in Toraya spend time in regret about the events that had happened, Tora continues his trip with a smile on his face.

== Cast ==
- Kiyoshi Atsumi as Torajiro
- Chieko Baisho as Sakura
- Komaki Kurihara as Haruko
- Chieko Misaki as Tsune Kuruma (Torajiro's aunt)
- Gin Maeda as Hiroshi Suwa
- Masaaki Tsusaka as Noboru Kawamata
- Gajirō Satō as Genkichi (Man at the Temple)

== Critical appraisal ==
The German-language site molodezhnaja gives Tora-san's Grand Scheme three out of five stars.

== Availability ==
Tora-san's Grand Scheme was released theatrically on February 27, 1970. In Japan, the film was released on videotape in 1989 and 1995, and in DVD format in 2000, 2005, and 2008. AnimEigo released the film on DVD in the US along with the other first four films in the Otoko wa Tsurai yo series on November 24, 2009.

== Bibliography ==
=== English ===
- "OTOKO WA TSURAI YO SHIN OTOKO WA TSURAIYO (1970)". British Film Institute. Archived from the original on 2012-10-17.
- Rich, Jamie S. (2009-12-21). "Tora-San: Collector's Set 1". DVD Talk.
- "SHIN OTOKO WA TSURAIYO". Complete Index to World Film.
- Shin otoko wa tsurai yo (1970) at IMDb

=== German ===
- "Tora-San's Grand Scheme" (in German). www.molodezhnaja.ch.

=== Japanese ===
- 新・男はつらいよ(1970) (in Japanese). allcinema.net.
- "新・男はつらいよ". Japanese Cinema Database (Agency for Cultural Affairs). Archived from the original on 2011-10-08.
- 新・男はつらいよ (in Japanese). Japanese Movie Database.
- 新・男はつらいよ (in Japanese). Kinema Junpo. Archived from the original on 2012-03-09.
