= Tora-san Plays Cupid =

- Theatrical poster
- Directed by: Yoji Yamada
- Written by: Yoji Yamada; Yoshitaka Asama
- Starring: Kiyoshi Atsumi; Shiho Fujimura
- Cinematography: Tetsuo Takaba
- Edited by: Iwao Ishii
- Music by: Naozumi Yamamoto
- Distributed by: Shochiku
- Release date: December 29, 1977
- Running time: 95 minutes
- Country: Japan
- Language: Japanese

Tora-san Plays Cupid (男はつらいよ 寅次郎頑張れ!, Otoko wa Tsurai yo: Torajirō Gambare!) aka Tora-san, Hold Out! is a 1977 Japanese comedy film directed by Yoji Yamada. It stars Kiyoshi Atsumi as Torajirō Kuruma (Tora-san), and Shiho Fujimura as his love interest or "Madonna". Tora-san Plays Cupid is the twentieth entry in the popular, long-running Otoko wa Tsurai yo series.

== Synopsis ==
Tora-san plays at matchmaker, trying to arrange a romance between Ryōsuke and Sachiko. His advice proves disastrous and Tora-san instead falls in love with Ryōsuke's sister.

== Cast ==
- Kiyoshi Atsumi as Torajirō
- Chieko Baisho as Sakura
- Shiho Fujimura as Fujiko Shimada
- Masatoshi Nakamura as Ryōsuke Shimada
- Shinobu Otake as Sachiko Fukumura
- Masami Shimojō as Kuruma Tatsuzō
- Chieko Misaki as Tsune Kuruma (Torajiro's aunt)
- Gin Maeda as Hiroshi Suwa
- Hayato Nakamura as Mitsuo Suwa
- Hisao Dazai as Boss (Umetarō Katsura)
- Gajirō Satō as Genkō

== Critical appraisal ==
Kiyoshi Atsumi was nominated for Best Actor at the Japan Academy Prize ceremony for his performances in Tora-san Plays Cupid, Tora-san Meets His Lordship and Yatsuhaka-mura (all 1977). Chieko Baisho was also nominated for Best Actress and Shinobu Otake for Best Supporting Actress at the same ceremony. Stuart Galbraith IV judges the film to be another good entry in the Otoko wa Tsurai yo series, funny and with a strong supporting cast. The German-language site molodezhnaja gives Tora-san Plays Cupid three and a half out of five stars.

== Availability ==
Tora-san Plays Cupid was released theatrically on December 29, 1977. In Japan, the film was released on videotape in 1996, and in DVD format in 1998, 2002, and 2008.

== Bibliography ==
=== English ===
- "OTOKO WA TSURAI YO TORAJIRO GANBARE (1977)". British Film Institute. Archived from the original on 2012-10-17.
- "OTOKO WA TSURAIYO -TORAJIRO GANBARE". Complete Index to World Film.
- Otoko wa tsurai yo: Torajiro gambare! (1977) at IMDb
- Galbraith IV, Stuart (2006-03-08). "Tora-san 20: Tora-san Plays Cupid (Region 3)". DVD Talk.

=== German ===
- "Tora-San Plays Cupid" (in German). www.molodezhnaja.ch.

=== Japanese ===
- 男はつらいよ 寅次郎頑張れ！(1977) (in Japanese). allcinema.net.
- "男はつらいよ 寅次郎頑張れ!". Japanese Cinema Database (Agency for Cultural Affairs). Archived from the original on 2012-03-11.
- 男はつらいよ 寅次郎頑張れ! (in Japanese). Japanese Movie Database.
- 男はつらいよ 寅次郎頑張れ! (in Japanese). Kinema Junpo. Archived from the original on 2012-03-09.
