= Tora-san's Forbidden Love =

- Theatrical poster
- Directed by: Yoji Yamada
- Written by: Yoji Yamada; Yoshitaka Asama
- Starring: Kiyoshi Atsumi; Reiko Ōhara
- Cinematography: Tetsuo Takaba
- Edited by: Iwao Ishii
- Music by: Naozumi Yamamoto
- Distributed by: Shochiku
- Release date: December 28, 1984
- Running time: 107 minutes
- Country: Japan
- Language: Japanese

Tora-san's Forbidden Love (男はつらいよ 寅次郎真実一路, Otoko wa Tsurai yo: Torajirō Shinjitsu Ichiro) is a 1984 Japanese comedy film directed by Yoji Yamada. It stars Kiyoshi Atsumi as Torajirō Kuruma (Tora-san), and Reiko Ōhara as his love interest or "Madonna". Tora-san's Forbidden Love is the thirty-fourth entry in the popular, long-running Otoko wa Tsurai yo series.

== Plot ==
In the midst of Japan's rising economy of the mid-1980s, the itinerant Tora-san becomes drunk with a hard-working company section chief. After an hour commute, the two sleep off their night's revelry at the section chief's home in Ibaraki Prefecture. When the section chief disappears due to the pressure of his job, Tora-san helps his wife to find the man, while secretly hoping they do not, as he has fallen in love with her.

== Cast ==
- Kiyoshi Atsumi as Torajirō
- Chieko Baisho as Sakura
- Reiko Ōhara as Fujiko Tominaga
- Masakane Yonekura as Kenkichi Tominaga
- Jun Miho as Akemi
- Shimojo Masami as Kuruma Tatsuzō
- Chieko Misaki as Tsune Kuruma (Torajiro's aunt)
- Gin Maeda as Hiroshi Suwa
- Hidetaka Yoshioka as Mitsuo Suwa
- Hisao Dazai as Boss (Umetarō Katsura)
- Gajirō Satō as Genkō

== Critical appraisal ==
Director Yoji Yamada was nominated for the Golden Prize at the 14th Moscow International Film Festival. At the Japan Academy Prize long-time Otoko wa Tsurai yo composer, Naozumi Yamamoto was nominated for Best Music Score for his work in this film. Stuart Galbraith IV rates the film no better than average for the series, but still recommends it highly due to the series' high standards. He notes that it benefits from an opening dream-sequence satire of kaiju eiga, or monster films, with footage from Shochiku's entry in this genre, The X from Outer Space, employed. This was meant to reference Godzilla's return from retirement in The Return of Godzilla (1984), which had been released just before the Tora-san film. Kevin Thomas of the Los Angeles Times wrote that the film was a "little slow in getting to its wrap-up, but it's the kind of honestly sentimental film that leaves you feeling better when the lights go up than when they went down." The German-language site molodezhnaja gives Tora-san's Forbidden Love three and a half out of five stars.

== Availability ==
Tora-san's Forbidden Love was released theatrically on December 28, 1984. In Japan, the film was released on videotape in 1987 and 1996, and in DVD format in 2002 and 2008.

== Bibliography ==
=== English ===
- "OTOKO WA TSURAIYO -TORAJIRO SHINJITSU ICHIRO". Complete Index to World Film.
- Otoko wa tsurai yo: Torajirô shinjitsu ichiro (1984) at IMDb
- Galbraith IV, Stuart (2007-02-08). "Tora-san 34: Tora-san's Forbidden Love (Region 3)". DVD Talk.

=== German ===
- "Tora-San's Forbidden Love" (in German). molodezhnaja.ch.

=== Japanese ===
- 男はつらいよ 寅次郎真実一路 (1984) (in Japanese). allcinema.net.
- "男はつらいよ 寅次郎真実一路". Japanese Cinema Database (Agency for Cultural Affairs). Archived from the original on 2014-05-17.
- 男はつらいよ 寅次郎真実一路 (in Japanese). Japanese Movie Database.
- 男はつらいよ 寅次郎真実一路 (in Japanese). Kinema Junpo. Archived from the original on 2012-06-29.
