= Tora's Pure Love =

- Theatrical poster
- Directed by: Yoji Yamada
- Written by: Yoji Yamada; Yoshitaka Asama
- Starring: Kiyoshi Atsumi; Machiko Kyō
- Cinematography: Tetsuo Takaba
- Edited by: Iwao Ishii
- Music by: Naozumi Yamamoto
- Distributed by: Shochiku
- Release date: December 25, 1976
- Running time: 103 minutes
- Country: Japan
- Language: Japanese

Tora's Pure Love (男はつらいよ 寅次郎純情詩集, Otoko wa Tsurai yo: Torajirō Junjō Shishū) a.k.a. Torasan Meets his School-Mates, and Tora-san's Heart of Gold is a 1976 Japanese comedy film directed by Yoji Yamada. It stars Kiyoshi Atsumi as Torajirō Kuruma (Tora-san), and Machiko Kyō as his love interest or "Madonna". Tora's Pure Love is the eighteenth entry in the popular, long-running Otoko wa Tsurai yo series, and was Machiko Kyō's penultimate film appearance.

== Plot ==
When Tora-san's infatuation with his nephew's school-teacher causes family turmoil, he sets out on another journey. When he returns, he falls in love with the teacher's mother, who has a terminal illness.

== Cast ==
- Kiyoshi Atsumi as Torajirō
- Chieko Baisho as Sakura
- Machiko Kyō as Aya Yagyū
- Fumi Dan as Masako Yagyū
- Masami Shimojō as Kuruma Tatsuzō
- Chieko Misaki as Tsune Kuruma (Torajiro's aunt)
- Gin Maeda as Hiroshi Suwa
- Hayato Nakamura as Mitsuo Suwa
- Hisao Dazai as Boss (Umetarō Katsura)
- Gajirō Satō as Genkō
- Chishū Ryū as Gozen-sama
- Yoshio Yoshida as Chairman
- Mari Okamoto as Sayuri Ōzora

== Critical appraisal ==
Tora's Pure Love was the sixth top-grossing Japanese film of 1976. However, Stuart Galbraith IV writes that the film is disappointing compared to the previous Tora-san's Sunrise and Sunset (also 1976), more sentimental and less well-plotted than the earlier film. Galbraith judges Tora's Pure Love, nevertheless, to be funny and enjoyable for the scenes between series star Kiyoshi Atsumi and actress Machiko Kyō in one of her last appearances. The German-language site molodezhnaja gives Tora's Pure Love three and a half out of five stars.

== Availability ==
Tora's Pure Love was released theatrically on December 25, 1976. In Japan, the film was released on videotape in 1996 and on DVD in 1999 and 2008.

== Bibliography ==
=== English ===
- "OTOKO WA TSURAI YO TORAJIRO JUNJO SHISHU (1976)". British Film Institute. Archived from the original on 2009-05-20.
- "OTOKO WA TSURAIYO -TORAJIRO JUNJO SHISHU". Complete Index to World Film.
- Otoko wa tsurai yo: Torajirô junjô shishû (1976) at IMDb
- Galbraith IV, Stuart (2005-12-20). "Tora-san 18: Tora-san's Heart of Gold (Region 3)". DVD Talk.

=== German ===
- "Tora-San's Heart of Gold" (in German). molodezhnaja.ch.

=== Japanese ===
- 男はつらいよ 寅次郎純情詩集(1976) (in Japanese). allcinema.net.
- "男はつらいよ 寅次郎純情詩集". Japanese Cinema Database (Agency for Cultural Affairs). Archived from the original on 2012-02-26.
- 男はつらいよ 寅次郎純情詩集 (in Japanese). Japanese Movie Database.
- 男はつらいよ 寅次郎純情詩集 (in Japanese). Kinema Junpo. Archived from the original on 2012-03-09.
