= Tora-san Confesses =

- Theatrical poster
- Directed by: Yoji Yamada
- Written by: Yoji Yamada; Yoshitaka Asama
- Produced by: Hiroshi Fukazawa
- Starring: Kiyoshi Atsumi; Kumiko Goto
- Cinematography: Tetsuo Takaba; Mitsumi Hanada
- Edited by: Iwao Ishii
- Music by: Naozumi Yamamoto
- Distributed by: Shochiku
- Release date: December 23, 1991
- Running time: 104 minutes
- Country: Japan
- Language: Japanese

Tora-san Confesses (男はつらいよ 寅次郎の告白, Otoko wa Tsurai yo: Torajirō no Kokuhaku) is a 1991 Japanese comedy film directed by Yoji Yamada. It stars Kiyoshi Atsumi as Torajirō Kuruma (Tora-san), and Hideko Yoshida as his love interest or "Madonna". Tora-san Confesses is the forty-fourth entry in the popular, long-running Otoko wa Tsurai yo series.

== Cast ==
- Kiyoshi Atsumi as Torajirō
- Chieko Baisho as Sakura
- Hidetaka Yoshioka as Mitsuo (Sakura's son)
- Kumiko Goto as Izumi Oikawa (Mitsuo's girlfriend)
- Hideko Yoshida as Seikō
- Shimojo Masami as Kuruma Tatsuzō
- Chieko Misaki as Tsune Kuruma (Torajirō's aunt)
- Hisao Dazai as Boss (Umetarō Katsura)
- Gajirō Satō as Genkō
- Keiroku Seki as Ponshū

== Critical appraisal ==
Series Director Yoji Yamada and Yoshitaka Asama were nominated for Best Screenplay at the Japan Academy Prize for their work on Tora-san Confesses. Other nominations for the film at the ceremony were Mitsuo Degawa for Best Art Direction and Isao Suzuki and Takashi Matsumoto for Best Sound. Kevin Thomas of the Los Angeles Times wrote that this entry "is a charmer, full of the sentiment, humor and compassion that made the Tora-san movies always the most popular attraction" at Japanese language cinemas in Los Angeles. The German-language site molodezhnaja gives Tora-san Confesses three out of five stars.

== Availability ==
Tora-san Confesses was released theatrically on December 23, 1991. In Japan, the film was released on videotape in 1992 and 1996, and in DVD format in 2000 and 2005.

== Bibliography ==
=== English ===
- "OTOKO WA TSURAIYO -TORAJIRO NO KOKUHAKU". Complete Index to World Film.
- Otoko wa tsurai yo: Torajiro no kokuhaku (1991) at IMDb

=== German ===
- "Tora-San Confesses" (in German). www.molodezhnaja.ch.

=== Japanese ===
- 男はつらいよ 寅次郎の告白 (1991) (in Japanese). allcinema.net.
- "男はつらいよ 寅次郎の告白". Japanese Cinema Database (Agency for Cultural Affairs). Archived from the original on 2012-03-26.
- 男はつらいよ 寅次郎の告白 (in Japanese). Japanese Movie Database.
- 男はつらいよ 寅次郎の告白 (in Japanese). Kinema Junpo. Archived from the original on 2012-03-24.
