= Tora-san Meets His Lordship =

- Theatrical poster
- Directed by: Yoji Yamada
- Written by: Yoji Yamada; Yoshitaka Asama
- Starring: Kiyoshi Atsumi; Kyōko Maya
- Cinematography: Tetsuo Takaba
- Edited by: Iwao Ishii
- Music by: Naozumi Yamamoto
- Distributed by: Shochiku
- Release date: August 6, 1977
- Running time: 99 minutes
- Country: Japan
- Language: Japanese

Tora-san Meets His Lordship (男はつらいよ 寅次郎と殿様, Otoko wa Tsurai yo: Torajirō to Tonosama) a.k.a. Tora-san and a Lord is a 1977 Japanese comedy film directed by Yoji Yamada. It stars Kiyoshi Atsumi as Torajirō Kuruma (Tora-san), and Kyōko Maya as his love interest or "Madonna". Tora-san Meets His Lordship is the nineteenth entry in the popular, long-running Otoko wa Tsurai yo series.

== Synopsis ==
Tora-san returns to his family home in Shibamata, Tokyo, but soon leaves again due to squabbles involving a dog they have named Tora-san. During his travels in Shikoku, Tora-san makes the acquaintance of a descendant of a local daimyō. The old man asks Tora-san to find his son's widow in Tokyo, whom he had previously alienated.

== Cast ==
- Kiyoshi Atsumi as Torajirō
- Chieko Baisho as Sakura
- Kyōko Maya as Mariko Tsutsumi
- Masami Shimojō as Kuruma Tatsuzō
- Chieko Misaki as Tsune Kuruma (Torajiro's aunt)
- Gin Maeda as Hiroshi Suwa
- Hisao Dazai as Boss (Umetarō Katsura)
- Gajirō Satō as Genkō
- Hayato Nakamura as Mitsuo Suwa
- Yoshio Yoshida as Leader
- Akira Terao as Officer
- Kanjūrō Arashi as Todo
- Norihei Miki as Yoshida

== Critical appraisal ==
Tora-san Meets His Lordship was the ninth top money-maker at the Japanese box-office in 1977. Kiyoshi Atsumi and Chieko Baisho were nominated for Best Actor and Best Actress respectively at the Japan Academy Prize ceremony for their roles in Tora-san Meets His Lordship and other films in which they had appeared in 1977. Stuart Galbraith IV writes that the film, though not as popular as its predecessor Tora's Pure Love, is a strong entry in the Otoko wa Tsurai yo series, funny and with an exceptionally good supporting cast. The German-language site molodezhnaja gives Tora-san Meets His Lordship three and a half out of five stars.

== Availability ==
Tora-san Meets His Lordship was released theatrically on August 6, 1977. In Japan, the film was released on videotape in 1996, and in DVD format in 2005 and 2008.

== Bibliography ==
=== English ===
- "OTOKO WA TSURAI YO TORAJIRO TO TONOSAMA (1977)". British Film Institute. Archived from the original on 2012-10-17.
- "OTOKO WA TSURAIYO -TORAJIRO TO TONOSAMA". Complete Index to World Film.
- Otoko wa tsurai yo: Torajirô to tonosama (1977) at IMDb
- Galbraith IV, Stuart (2006-03-02). "Tora-san 19: Tora-san meets His Lordship (Region 3)". DVD Talk.

=== German ===
- "Tora-San Meets His Lordship" (in German). www.molodezhnaja.ch.

=== Japanese ===
- 男はつらいよ 寅次郎と殿様(1977) (in Japanese). allcinema.net.
- "男はつらいよ 寅次郎と殿様". Japanese Cinema Database (Agency for Cultural Affairs). Archived from the original on 2012-03-11.
- 男はつらいよ 寅次郎と殿様 (in Japanese). Japanese Movie Database.
- 男はつらいよ 寅次郎と殿様 (in Japanese). Kinema Junpo. Archived from the original on 2012-03-09.
