= Tora-san's Cherished Mother =

- Theatrical poster
- Directed by: Yoji Yamada
- Written by: Yoji Yamada; Shun'ichi Kobayashi; Akira Miyazaki
- Starring: Kiyoshi Atsumi; Orie Satō
- Cinematography: Tetsuo Takaba
- Edited by: Iwao Ishii
- Music by: Naozumi Yamamoto
- Distributed by: Shochiku
- Release date: November 15, 1969
- Running time: 93 minutes
- Country: Japan
- Language: Japanese

Tora-san's Cherished Mother (続・男はつらいよ, Zoku Otoko wa Tsurai yo), aka Tora-san's Homeward Journey, Am I Trying? Part II, and Torasan Pt. 2, is a 1969 Japanese comedy film directed by Yoji Yamada. It stars Kiyoshi Atsumi as Kuruma Torajirō (Tora-san), and Orie Satō as his love interest or "Madonna". Tora-san's Cherished Mother is the second entry in the popular, long-running Otoko wa Tsurai yo series.

== Plot ==
Torajiro ("Tora") has a dream about meeting his birthmother, Okiku at the beginning of the film.

While continuing his "journey," (and after going briefly to Toraya, his aunt and uncle's shop), he finds his old English teacher's house, Mr. Tsubouchi's house. Back at grade school, he was very understanding of Tora and Tora had liked him very much. In addition, at this house, he meets Natsuko, the teacher's son. Though, he intended to only stay a little while, eventually he goes on eating and drinking and staying for the night, until he overdoes it and gets cramps (after which he gets sent to the hospital). Quickly recovering, he starts joking around with the patients in the hospital. Afterwards, he quickly escapes from the hospital. Natsuko ends up apologizing to his doctor, Dr. Fujimura. During dinner, Tora dines in at a yakitori with his apprentice Noboru, only to get into a fight with the cashier and get caught by the police. Though he does not actually get jailed, he ends up bidding the teacher farewell and setting off on a journey.

One month passes, and Natsuko and the teacher find Tora at Kyoto, fortune-telling people's fates. Though the teacher is upset, he and Natsuko find out that Tora's mother (Okiku) is in Kyoto, working at a hotel after having quit being a geisha. As Tora knew the address of where she was, the teacher pushes Tora to see his mother, as he stated that it was better to visit her now before it was too late. However, Tora's mother was quite mean to Tora, asking him "Okay, and what do you want now...money?" Eventually, Tora got to his senses, got into a verbal argument, and eventually left the hotel.

Tora goes back to Toraya, depressed with the hotel meeting. However, after hanging out with Natsuko repetitively, Tora gradually restores his happiness. Meanwhile, at the same time, the teacher's health also starts to deteriorate. One day, the teacher asks Tora to get eel from the Edo River to eat. Though Tora at first refuses the idea, saying that the Edo River had gotten dirty, he eventually goes to the Edo River. Though he had no luck at first, after a while he gets the eel that he had wanted. Unfortunately, by the time he returned to the teacher's house he had died.

Not long after, a funeral is held in the teacher's house. Though Tora is at first quite sad, eventually he gets back to a slightly more calm mood. Later, it is found that Dr. Fujimura had also come, and comforts Natsuko, therefore revealing Fujimura's love and affection for Natsuko. Eventually, Tora goes back to Toraya and after a little contemplation, states that by taking care of the funeral, he "[has] been able to repay his kindness," before saying that "the teacher would know how [he feels]."

Eventually, Natsuko and Dr. Fujimura marry. On their honeymoon to Kyoto, the two find Tora and his mother Okiku walking around together.

== Cast ==
- Kiyoshi Atsumi as Torajiro
- Chieko Baisho as Sakura
- Chōchō Miyako as Okiku
- Orie Satō as Natsuko Tsubouchi
- Tsutomu Yamazaki as Kaoru Fujimura
- Chieko Misaki as Torajiro's aunt
- Gin Maeda as Hiroshi Suwa
- Masaaki Tsusaka as Noboru Kawamata
- Akiko Kazami as Osumi
- Hisao Dazai as Umetarō Katsura (Print Shop)

== Critical appraisal ==
Kiyoshi Atsumi was given the Best Actor award at the Mainichi Film Awards for his performance in this film and the previous entry in the series, It's Tough Being a Man (also 1969). Yoji Yamada was also awarded Best Director at the ceremony for the same two films.

The German-language site molodezhnaja gives Tora-san's Cherished Mother three and a half out of five stars.

== Releases ==
Tora-san's Cherished Mother was released theatrically on November 15, 1969.

=== Home media ===
In Japan, the film was released on videotape in 1983 and 1995, and in DVD format in 2005 and 2008. AnimEigo released the film on DVD in the US along with the other first four films in the Otoko wa Tsurai yo series on November 24, 2009.

== Bibliography ==
=== English ===
- Rich, Jamie S. (2009-12-21). "Tora-San: Collector's Set 1". DVD Talk.
- "ZOKU OTOKO WA TSURAI YO (1969)". British Film Institute. Archived from the original on 2012-10-17.
- "ZOKU OTOKOWA TSURAIYO". Complete Index to World Film.
- Zoku otoko wa tsurai yo (1969) at IMDb

=== German ===
- "Tora-San's Cherished Mother" (in German). www.molodezhnaja.ch.

=== Japanese ===
- 続・男はつらいよ(1969) (in Japanese). allcinema.net.
- "続・男はつらいよ". Japanese Cinema Database (Agency for Cultural Affairs). Archived from the original on 2011-10-08.
- 続・男はつらいよ (in Japanese). Japanese Movie Database.
- 続・男はつらいよ (in Japanese). Kinema Junpo. Archived from the original on 2012-03-09.
