= Tora-san's Dream-Come-True =

- Theatrical poster
- Directed by: Yoji Yamada
- Written by: Yoji Yamada; Yoshitaka Asama
- Starring: Kiyoshi Atsumi; Kaoru Yachigusa
- Cinematography: Tetsuo Takaba
- Edited by: Iwao Ishii
- Music by: Naozumi Yamamoto
- Distributed by: Shochiku
- Release date: December 29, 1972
- Running time: 95 minutes
- Country: Japan
- Language: Japanese

Tora-san's Dream-Come-True (男はつらいよ 寅次郎夢枕, Otoko wa Tsurai yo: Torajirō Yumemakura) a.k.a. Torasan Appears in a Dream is a 1972 Japanese comedy film directed by Yoji Yamada. It stars Kiyoshi Atsumi as Torajirō Kuruma (Tora-san), and Kaoru Yachigusa as his love interest or "Madonna". Tora-san's Dream-Come-True is the tenth entry in the popular, long-running Otoko wa Tsurai yo series.

== Synopsis ==
When Tora-san returns to visit his family, he is surprised to find an arrogant professor occupying his room. The professor and Tora-san become rivals for the affection of Chiyo. Both lose, and the professor leaves for America while Tora-san returns to his travels.

== Cast ==
- Kiyoshi Atsumi as Torajiro
- Chieko Baisho as Sakura
- Kaoru Yachigusa as Chiyo Shimura
- Masakane Yonekura as Prof. Kin'nosuke Okakura
- Tatsuo Matsumura as Kuruma Tatsuzō
- Chieko Misaki as Tsune Kuruma (Torajiro's aunt)
- Gin Maeda as Hiroshi Suwa
- Hayato Nakamura as Mitsuo Suwa
- Masaaki Tsusaka as Kawamata Noboru
- Hisao Dazai as Tarō Ume
- Gajirō Satō as Genkō
- Masao Shimizu as Yunaka

== Critical appraisal ==
Yoji Yamada was given the Best Director prize at the Mainichi Film Awards for Tora-san's Dream-Come-True and the next entry in the series, Tora-san's Forget Me Not (1973). Stuart Galbraith IV writes that the film is hit-and-miss, with some amusing sequences, but suffers due to the overly clownish professor character. One of the highlights of the film, according to Galbraith, is the performance of the noted actress and director Kinuyo Tanaka. The German-language site molodezhnaja gives Tora-san's Dream-Come-True three out of five stars.

== Availability ==
Tora-san's Dream-Come-True was released theatrically on December 29, 1972. In Japan, the film was released on videotape in 1995, and in DVD format in 2005 and 2008.

== Bibliography ==
=== English ===
- "Otoko Wa Tsurai Yo Torajiro Yume Makura (1972)". British Film Institute. Archived from the original on 2012-10-17.
- "Otoko Wa Tsuraiyo -Torajiro Yumemakura". Complete Index to World Film.
- Otoko wa tsurai yo: Torajiro yumemakura (1972) at IMDb
- Galbraith IV, Stuart (2005-01-09). "Tora-san 10: Tora-san's Dream Come True (Region 3)". DVD Talk.

=== German ===
- "Tora-San's Dream Come True". molodezhnaja.ch (in German).

=== Japanese ===
- 男はつらいよ 寅次郎夢枕(1972). allcinema.net (in Japanese).
- "男はつらいよ 寅次郎夢枕". Japanese Cinema Database. Agency for Cultural Affairs. Archived from the original on 2012-02-26.
- 男はつらいよ 寅次郎夢枕. Japanese Movie Database (in Japanese).
- 男はつらいよ 寅次郎夢枕. Kinema Junpo (in Japanese). Archived from the original on 2012-03-09.
