= Tora-san, the Go-Between =

- Theatrical poster
- Directed by: Yoji Yamada
- Written by: Yoji Yamada; Yoshitaka Asama
- Starring: Kiyoshi Atsumi; Kanako Higuchi
- Cinematography: Tetsuo Takaba
- Edited by: Iwao Ishii
- Music by: Naozumi Yamamoto
- Distributed by: Shochiku
- Release date: August 3, 1985
- Running time: 108 minutes
- Country: Japan
- Language: Japanese

Tora-san, the Go-Between (男はつらいよ 寅次郎恋愛塾, Otoko wa Tsurai yo: Torajirō Ren'aijuku) is a 1985 Japanese comedy film directed by Yoji Yamada. It stars Kiyoshi Atsumi as Torajirō Kuruma (Tora-san), and Kanako Higuchi as his love interest or "Madonna". Tora-san, the Go-Between is the thirty-fifth entry in the popular, long-running Otoko wa Tsurai yo series.

== Synopsis ==
In Nagasaki, Tora-san and an acquaintance help an old woman who has fallen and injured herself. She invites them to her home where the three share a night of eating and drinking. The old woman's health deteriorates and she dies. At her funeral, Tora-san falls in love with the old woman's daughter, but winds up acting as a go-between for her and a young law student.

== Cast ==
- Kiyoshi Atsumi as Torajirō
- Chieko Baisho as Sakura
- Mitsuru Hirata as Tamio Sakata
- Kanako Higuchi as Wakana Egami
- Shimojo Masami as Kuruma Tatsuzō
- Chieko Misaki as Tsune Kuruma (Torajiro's aunt)
- Hisao Dazai as Boss (Umetarō Katsura)
- Gajirō Satō as Genkō
- Hidetaka Yoshioka as Mitsuo Suwa
- Gin Maeda as Hiroshi Suwa
- Keiroku Seki as Ponshū

== Critical appraisal ==
Series composer Naozumi Yamamoto was nominated for Best Music Score at the Japan Academy Prize for his work on Tora-san, the Go-Between. Though commenting that the film opens with an especially funny dream-sequence satirizing The Ballad of Narayama Stuart Galbraith IV judges this film to be one of the weaker of the series. It treads no new ground for the series, instead putting Tora-san in situations in which he had been before. The German-language site molodezhnaja gives Tora-san, the Go-Between three and a half out of five stars.

== Availability ==
Tora-san, the Go-Between was released theatrically on August 3, 1985. In Japan, the film was released on videotape in 1987 and 1996, and in DVD format in 2000, 2005, and 2008.

== Bibliography ==
=== English ===
- "OTOKO WA TSURAIYO -TORAJIRO RENAIJUKU". Complete Index to World Film.
- Otoko wa tsurai yo: Torajirô ren'ai juku (1985) at IMDb
- Galbraith IV, Stuart (2007-10-20). "Tora-san 35: Tora-san's The Go Between (Region 3)". DVD Talk.

=== German ===
- "Tora-San's The Go-Between" (in German). www.molodezhnaja.ch.

=== Japanese ===
- 男はつらいよ 寅次郎恋愛塾 (1985) (in Japanese). allcinema.net.
- "男はつらいよ 寅次郎恋愛塾". Japanese Cinema Database (Agency for Cultural Affairs). Archived from the original on 2012-03-11.
- 男はつらいよ 寅次郎恋愛塾 (in Japanese). Japanese Movie Database.
- 男はつらいよ 寅次郎恋愛塾 (in Japanese). Kinema Junpo. Archived from the original on 2012-06-23.
