= Tora-san's Runaway =

- Theatrical poster
- Directed by: Yoji Yamada
- Written by: Yoji Yamada; Akira Miyazaki
- Starring: Kiyoshi Atsumi; Aiko Nagayama
- Cinematography: Tetsuo Takaba
- Edited by: Iwao Ishii
- Music by: Naozumi Yamamoto
- Distributed by: Shochiku
- Release date: August 26, 1970
- Running time: 88 minutes
- Country: Japan
- Language: Japanese

Tora-san's Runaway (男はつらいよ 望郷篇, Otoko wa Tsurai yo: Bōkyō hen) aka Tora-san Homebound is a 1970 Japanese comedy film directed by Yoji Yamada. It stars Kiyoshi Atsumi as Torajirō Kuruma (Tora-san), and Aiko Nagayama as his love interest or "Madonna". Tora-san's Runaway is the fifth entry in the popular, long-running Otoko wa Tsurai yo series. This movie was originally intended to be the last of the series, but due to the popularity of this film, the Otoko wa Tsurai yo series continued on.

== Plot ==
Tora has a vision (or dream) of his uncle dying.

As a result, when the people of Toraya joke that his uncle was on death's doorstep, he takes it literally, rushes home to Shibamata, and brings neighbors, the Lord, and even the funeral parlor over to Toraya. Unsurprisingly, this ends up resulting in an argument at Toraya.

At first, Sakura convinces Tora to stay at Toraya, but the next day, Noboru shows up, stating that one of his friends from Hokkaido (Masakichi Tatsuoka) was ill. Though he wanted to go to Hokkaido, no one would give him the money to. At the end, he ends up asking Sakura. Before giving the money, Sakura tells Tora that he should learn to live a modest life.

Arriving at Hokkaido, he and Noboru visits Masakichi at the hospital. There, Masakichi tells them that he wanted to see his son Sumio (a freight train mechanic) once again. However, Sumio could not get himself to see his father, as he had been abusing women and had no heart for other people. Masakichi dies soon after, and Tora starts to question his life. After bidding farewell to Noboru, Tora decides that he would like to live a modest life.

Returning to Shibamata, Tora states that he wants a job with "sweat and oil." Unfortunately, no shops in Shibamata would accept him. Eventually, in Urayasu, Tora finds a job at a tofu shop. When Sakura visits the shop, she is happy seeing that Tora was working hard. However, she was slightly concerned with Setsuko, the daughter from the tofu shop.

As Sakura thought, Tora had in fact fallen for Setsuko. The night after Setsuko's future wife Mr. Kimura (a diesel train mechanic for Kokutetsu) comes to the shop, Setusko has an argument with her mom Tomiko. Afterwards, Setsuko asks Tora if he could always work at the tofu shop, in which he responds "yes." Though at first, Tora felt that this was a proposal, soon he is introduced to Mr. Kimura. Though at first, when he finds out the truth between the two, he keeps cool and says that he will work for the shop anyways.

However, the next morning Tora suddenly ditches the shop and heads back to Shibamata. After a brief stop at Shibamata, Tora leaves for a trip again. While leaving for the trip, Tora says to Sakura (who approached him one last time) that he could not live a decent life, though he had really thought that he would be able to do so that time.

Around a month passes. Sakura and Setusuko are seen talking one last time. Meanwhile, Noboru and Tora reunite in Hokkaido; saying a Showa-style greeting ["Ohikaenasu-te!"] before erupting into a conversation full of jokes.

== Cast ==
- Kiyoshi Atsumi as Torajiro
- Chieko Baisho as Sakura
- Aiko Nagayama as Setsuko Miura
- Hisashi Igawa as Tsuyoshi Kimura
- Gin Maeda as Hiroshi Suwa
- Taisaku Akino as Noboru Kawamata
- Masamichi Matsuyama as Sumio Ishida
- Chieko Misaki as Tsune Kuruma (Torajiro's aunt)
- Hisao Dazai as Tarō Ume
- Tokuko Sugiyama as Setsuko's mother, Tomiko
- Gajirō Satō as Genkichi (Man at the Temple)
- Michio Kida as Masayoshi Takioka

== Critical appraisal ==
Chieko Baisho was given the Best Actress award at both the Mainichi Film Awards and the Kinema Junpo Awards for her roles in Tora-san's Runaway and Kazoku. Yoji Yamada and Akira Miyazaki were also given the Best Screenplay award at those two ceremonies for their work on those two films.

The German-language site molodezhnaja gives Tora-san's Runaway three out of five stars.

== Availability ==
Tora-san's Runaway was released theatrically on August 26, 1970. In Japan, the film was released on videotape in 1983 and 1995, and in DVD format in 2005 and 2008.

== Bibliography ==
=== English ===
- "OTOKO WA TSURAI YO BOKYO-HEN (1970)". British Film Institute. Archived from the original on 2012-10-17.
- "OTOKO WA TSURAIYO -BOKYO HEN". Complete Index to World Film.
- Otoko wa tsurai yo: Boukyou hen (1970) at IMDb

=== German ===
- "Tora-San's Runaway" (in German). molodezhnaja.ch.

=== Japanese ===
- 男はつらいよ 望郷篇(1970) (in Japanese). allcinema.net.
- "男はつらいよ 望郷篇". Japanese Cinema Database (Agency for Cultural Affairs). Archived from the original on 2011-10-08.
- 男はつらいよ 望郷篇 (in Japanese). Japanese Movie Database.
- 男はつらいよ 望郷篇 (in Japanese). Kinema Junpo. Archived from the original on 2012-03-09.
