= Tora-san Loves an Artist =

- Theatrical poster
- Directed by: Yoji Yamada
- Written by: Yoji Yamada; Yoshitaka Asama
- Starring: Kiyoshi Atsumi; Keiko Kishi
- Cinematography: Tetsuo Takaba
- Edited by: Iwao Ishii
- Music by: Naozumi Yamamoto
- Distributed by: Shochiku
- Release date: December 16, 1973
- Running time: 107 minutes
- Country: Japan
- Language: Japanese

Tora-san Loves an Artist (男はつらいよ 私の寅さん, Otoko wa Tsurai yo: Watashi no Tora-san) aka Tora-san Goes French is a 1973 Japanese comedy film directed by Yoji Yamada. It stars Kiyoshi Atsumi as Torajirō Kuruma (Tora-san), and Keiko Kishi as his love interest or "Madonna". Tora-san Loves an Artist is the twelfth entry in the popular, long-running Otoko wa Tsurai yo series.

== Synopsis ==
Tora-san watches the family shop while the rest of his family takes a vacation to Kyushu. An old friend introduces Tora-san to his sister Ritsuko, and he promptly falls in love with her. She is an artist and has no time for Tora-san.

== Cast ==
- Kiyoshi Atsumi as Torajirō
- Keiko Kishi as Ritsuko Yanagi
- Takehiko Maeda as Fumihiko Yanagi
- Chieko Baisho as Sakura
- Tatsuo Matsumura as Ryūzō Azuma
- Chieko Misaki as Tsune Kuruma (Torajiro's aunt)
- Gin Maeda as Hiroshi Suwa
- Hayato Nakamura as Mitsuo Suwa
- Hisao Dazai as Boss (Umetarō Katsura)
- Gajirō Satō as Genkō
- Chishū Ryū as Gozen-sama

== Critical appraisal ==
Stuart Galbraith IV calls Tora-san Loves an Artist a "solid" entry in the series, which is "alternately sweet and touching, funny and biting." The German-language site molodezhnaja gives Tora-san Loves an Artist three and a half out of five stars.

== Availability ==
Tora-san Loves an Artist was released theatrically on December 16, 1973. In Japan, the film was released on videotape in 1995, and in DVD format in 2008.

Alin

== Bibliography ==
=== English ===
- "OTOKO WA TSURAI YO WATASHI NO TORA-SAN (1973)". British Film Institute. Archived from the original on 2012-10-17.
- "OTOKO WA TSURAIYO -WATASHI NO TORAJIRO". Complete Index to World Film.
- Otoko wa tsurai yo: Watashi no tora-san (1973) at IMDb
- Galbraith IV, Stuart (2006-02-05). "Tora-san 12: Tora-san Loves an Artist (Region 3)". DVD Talk.

=== German ===
- "Tora-San Loves an Artist" (in German). www.molodezhnaja.ch.

=== Japanese ===
- 男はつらいよ 私の寅さん(1973) (in Japanese). allcinema.net.
- "男はつらいよ 私の寅さん". Japanese Cinema Database (Agency for Cultural Affairs). Archived from the original on 2012-02-26.
- 男はつらいよ 私の寅さん (in Japanese). Japanese Movie Database.
- 男はつらいよ 私の寅さん (in Japanese). Kinema Junpo. Archived from the original on 2012-03-09.
