= Mainichi Film Award for Best Director =

Annual Japanese film awards

- Awarded for: Best director of the year
- Country: Japan
- First award: 1946

The Mainichi Film Award for Best Director is a film award given at the Mainichi Film Awards.

== List of winners ==
Year	Director	Film
1946	Tadashi Imai	Minshū no Teki
1947	Akira Kurosawa	One Wonderful Sunday
1948	Keisuke Kinoshita	Woman; Shōzō; Apostasy
1949	Yasujirō Ozu	Late Spring
1950	Kōzaburō Yoshimura	Itsuwareru Seisō
1951	Mikio Naruse	Repast
1952	Minoru Shibuya	Gendai-jin; Honjitsu Kyūshin
1953	Tadashi Imai	An Inlet of Muddy Water
1954	Keisuke Kinoshita	Twenty-Four Eyes; The Garden of Women
1955	Mikio Naruse	Floating Clouds
1956	Tadashi Imai	Mahiru no ankoku
1957	Tadashi Imai	The Rice People; Jun'ai Monogatari
1958	Keisuke Kinoshita	The Ballad of Narayama
1959	Satsuo Yamamoto	Niguruma no Uta; Ningen no Kabe
1960	Kon Ichikawa	Her Brother; Jokyo
1961	Masaki Kobayashi	The Human Condition
1962	Kon Ichikawa	Being Two Isn't Easy; The Broken Commandment
1963	Shōhei Imamura	The Insect Woman
1964	Hiroshi Teshigahara	The Woman in the Dunes
1965	Tomu Uchida	A Fugitive from the Past
1966	Satsuo Yamamoto	Shiroi Kyotō
1967	Shōhei Imamura	A Man Vanishes
1968	Kihachi Okamoto	The Human Bullet
1969	Yoji Yamada	Kigeki Ippatsu Daihisshō; It's Tough Being a Man; Tora-san's Cherished Mother
1970	Satsuo Yamamoto	Men and War: Part I
1971	Masahiro Shinoda Yoji Yamada	Silence; Tora-san's Shattered Romance; Tora-san, the Good Samaritan; Tora-san's Love Call
1972	Kōichi Saitō	The Rendezvous; Tabi no Omosa
1973	Yoji Yamada	Tora-san's Dream-Come-True; Tora-san's Forget Me Not
1974	Yoshitarō Nomura	Castle of Sand
1975	Kaneto Shindo	Kenji Mizoguchi: The Life of a Film Director
1976	Satsuo Yamamoto	Fumō Chitai
1977	Yoji Yamada	The Yellow Handkerchief
1978	Yoshitarō Nomura	The Incident; The Demon
1979	Kazuhiko Hasegawa	The Man Who Stole the Sun
1980	Akira Kurosawa	Kagemusha
1981	Kōhei Oguri	Muddy River
1982	Kinji Fukasaku	Fall Guy; Dotonbori River
1983	Nagisa Oshima	Merry Christmas, Mr. Lawrence
1984	Juzo Itami	The Funeral
1985	Akira Kurosawa	Ran
1986	Kei Kumai	The Sea and Poison
1987	Kazuo Hara	The Emperor's Naked Army Marches On
1988	Nobuhiko Obayashi	The Discarnates
1989	Toshio Masuda	Shaso
1990	Jun Ichikawa	Tugumi
1991	Yoji Yamada	My Sons
1992	Yōichi Higashi	The River with No Bridge
1993	Jun Ichikawa	Byōin de Shinu to Iukoto
1994	Tatsumi Kumashiro	Like a Rolling Stone
1995	Kaneto Shindo	A Last Note
1996	Masayuki Suo	Shall We Dance?
1997	Shōhei Imamura	The Eel
1998	Hideyuki Hirayama	Begging for Love
1999	Yoshimitsu Morita	Keiho
2000	Junji Sakamoto	Face
2001	Hayao Miyazaki	Spirited Away
2002	Hideyuki Hirayama	Out; The Laughing Frog
2003	Yoichi Sai	Doing Time
2004	Kazuo Kuroki	Utsukushii Natsu Kirishima; The Face of Jizo
2005	Akira Ogata	Itsuka dokusho suruhi
2006	Kichitaro Negishi	What the Snow Brings
2007	Masayuki Suo	I Just Didn't Do It
2008	Kōji Wakamatsu	United Red Army
2009	Sion Sono	Love Exposure
2010	Takashi Miike	13 Assassins
2011	Katsuya Tomita	Saudade
2012	Daihachi Yoshida	The Kirishima Thing
2013	Yuya Ishii	The Great Passage
2014	Mipo O	The Light Shines Only There
2015	Shinya Tsukamoto	Fires on the Plain
2016	Miwa Nishikawa	The Long Excuse
2017	Katsuya Tomita	Bangkok Nites
2018	Shinichiro Ueda	One Cut of the Dead
2019	Kei Ishikawa	Listen to the Universe
2020	Naomi Kawase	True Mothers
2021	Ryusuke Hamaguchi	Drive My Car
2022	Shō Miyake	Small, Slow But Steady
2023	Yuya Ishii	The Moon
2024	Shō Miyake	All the Long Nights
2025	Lee Sang-il	Kokuho
