= Tora-san's Sunrise and Sunset =

- Theatrical poster
- Directed by: Yoji Yamada
- Written by: Yoji Yamada; Yoshitaka Asama
- Starring: Kiyoshi Atsumi; Kiwako Taichi
- Cinematography: Tetsuo Takaba
- Edited by: Iwao Ishii
- Music by: Naozumi Yamamoto
- Distributed by: Shochiku
- Release date: July 24, 1976
- Running time: 109 minutes
- Country: Japan
- Language: Japanese

Tora-san's Sunrise and Sunset (男はつらいよ 寅次郎夕焼け小焼け, Otoko wa Tsurai yo: Torajirō Yūyake Koyake) a.k.a. Torasan and the Painter and Tora-san's Sunset Glow is a 1976 Japanese comedy film directed by Yoji Yamada. It stars Kiyoshi Atsumi as Torajirō Kuruma (Tora-san), and Kiwako Taichi as his love interest or "Madonna". Tora-san's Sunrise and Sunset is the seventeenth entry in the popular, long-running Otoko wa Tsurai yo series.

== Synopsis ==
During his travels, Tora-san meets Ikenouchi, a drunken old man whom he assumes is poor and homeless. Tora-san takes the old man home. When he wakes up, Ikenouchi begins ordering Tora-san's family around in such an authoritarian manner that no one can muster the courage to suggest he leave. On the road again, Tora-san meets Botan, a geisha who has lost her life savings to a dishonest customer. He and his family's neighbor are determined to help her out. It later turns out that Ikenouchi is a famous artist and a drawing he has made for Tora-san is worth ¥70,000.

== Cast ==
- Kiyoshi Atsumi as Torajirō
- Chieko Baisho as Sakura
- Jūkichi Uno as Ikenouchi
- Kiwako Taichi as Botan (Geisha)
- Masami Shimojō as Kuruma Tatsuzō
- Chieko Misaki as Tsune Kuruma (Torajiro's aunt)
- Gin Maeda as Hiroshi Suwa
- Hisao Dazai as Boss (Umetarō Katsura)
- Gajirō Satō as Genkō
- Asao Sano
- Hayato Nakamura as Mitsuo Suwa
- Senri Sakurai as Tourist agency manager
- Yoshiko Okada as Shino
- Akira Terao as Tourist agency employee

== Critical appraisal ==
Tora-san's Sunrise and Sunset was the third top Japanese box-office winner of 1976. The Japanese academic film journal Kinema Junpo named it the second best Japanese release of the year. For her role in the film Kiwako Taichi was named Best Supporting Actress at both the Hochi Film Awards and the Kinema Junpo Awards ceremonies.

Stuart Galbraith IV judges Tora-san's Sunrise and Sunset to be one of the best of the Otoko wa Tsurai yo series, singling out the performances of guest stars Kiwako Taichi and Jūkichi Uno. The German-language site molodezhnaja gives Tora-san's Sunrise and Sunset three and a half out of five stars.

== Availability ==
Tora-san's Sunrise and Sunset was released theatrically on July 24, 1976. In Japan, the film was released on videotape in 1996, and in DVD format in 1997 and 2008.

== Bibliography ==
=== English ===
- "OTOKO WA TSURAI YO TORAJIRO YUYAKE KOYAKE (1976)". British Film Institute. Archived from the original on 2011-09-02.
- "OTOKO WA TSURAIYO -TORAJIRO YUYAKE KOYAKE". Complete Index to World Film.
- Otoko wa tsurai yo: Torajiro yuuyake koyake (1976) at IMDb
- Galbraith IV, Stuart (2005-12-12). "Tora-san 17: Tora-san's Sunrise and Sunset (Region 3)". DVD Talk.

=== German ===
- "Tora-San's Sunrise and Sunset" (in German). www.molodezhnaja.ch.

=== Japanese ===
- 男はつらいよ 寅次郎夕焼け小焼け (1976) (in Japanese). allcinema.net.
- "男はつらいよ 寅次郎夕焼け小焼け". Japanese Cinema Database (Agency for Cultural Affairs). Archived from the original on 2012-02-26.
- 男はつらいよ 寅次郎夕焼け小焼け (in Japanese). Japanese Movie Database.
- 男はつらいよ 寅次郎夕焼け小焼け (in Japanese). Kinema Junpo. Archived from the original on 2012-03-09.
