= Tora-san's Easy Advice =

- Theatrical poster
- Directed by: Yoji Yamada
- Written by: Yoji Yamada; Yoshitaka Asama
- Produced by: Yoshiki Nomura
- Starring: Kiyoshi Atsumi; Rino Katase
- Cinematography: Tetsuo Takaba
- Edited by: Iwao Ishii
- Music by: Naozumi Yamamoto; Jun'nosuke Yamamoto
- Distributed by: Shochiku
- Release date: December 23, 1994
- Running time: 101 minutes
- Country: Japan
- Language: Japanese

Tora-san's Easy Advice (男はつらいよ 拝啓 車寅次郎様, Otoko wa Tsurai yo: Haikei, Kuruma Torajirō-sama) is a 1994 Japanese comedy film directed by Yoji Yamada. It stars Kiyoshi Atsumi as Torajirō Kuruma (Tora-san), and Rino Katase as his love interest or "Madonna". Tora-san's Easy Advice is the forty-seventh entry in the popular, long-running Otoko wa Tsurai yo series.

== Cast ==
- Kiyoshi Atsumi as Torajirō
- Chieko Baisho as Sakura
- Hidetaka Yoshioka as Mitsuo Suwa
- Riho Makise as Nao Kawai
- Rino Katase as Noriko
- Shimojo Masami as Kuruma Tatsuzō
- Chieko Misaki as Tsune Kuruma (Torajirō's aunt)
- Masato Yamada as Shinobu Kawai
- Hisao Dazai as Boss (Umetarō Katsura)
- Gajirō Satō as Genkō

== Critical appraisal ==
The German-language site molodezhnaja gives Tora-san's Easy Advice three out of five stars.

== Availability ==
Tora-san's Easy Advice was released theatrically on December 23, 1994. In Japan, the film was released on videotape in 1996, and in DVD format in 2002 and 2008.

== Bibliography ==
=== English ===
- Otoko wa tsurai yo: Haikei, Kuruma Torajiro sama (1994) at IMDb

=== German ===
- "Tora-San's Easy Advice" (in German). www.molodezhnaja.ch.

=== Japanese ===
- 男はつらいよ 拝啓 車寅次郎様 (1994) (in Japanese). allcinema.net.
- "男はつらいよ 拝啓 車寅次郎様". Japanese Cinema Database (Agency for Cultural Affairs). Archived from the original on 2012-03-26.
- 男はつらいよ 拝啓 車寅次郎様 (in Japanese). Japanese Movie Database.
- 男はつらいよ 拝啓 車寅次郎様 (in Japanese). Kinema Junpo. Archived from the original on 2012-03-24.
