= Talk of the Town Tora-san =

- Theatrical poster
- Directed by: Yoji Yamada
- Written by: Yoji Yamada; Yoshitaka Asama
- Starring: Kiyoshi Atsumi; Reiko Ōhara
- Cinematography: Tetsuo Takaba
- Edited by: Iwao Ishii
- Music by: Naozumi Yamamoto
- Distributed by: Shochiku
- Release date: December 27, 1978
- Running time: 104 minutes
- Country: Japan
- Language: Japanese

Talk of the Town Tora-san (男はつらいよ 噂の寅次郎, Otoko wa Tsurai yo: Uwasa no Torajirō) aka Torasan and a Lovely Maid is a 1978 Japanese comedy film directed by Yoji Yamada. It stars Kiyoshi Atsumi as Torajirō Kuruma (Tora-san), and Reiko Ōhara as his love interest or "Madonna". Talk of the Town Tora-san is the twenty-second entry in the popular, long-running Otoko wa Tsurai yo series.

== Synopsis ==
Mistakenly believing that his brother-in-law's boss is planning to commit suicide, Tora-san attempts to prevent him.

== Cast ==
- Kiyoshi Atsumi as Torajirō
- Chieko Baisho as Sakura
- Reiko Ōhara as Sanae Arakawa
- Shimojo Masami as Kuruma Tatsuzō
- Chieko Misaki as Tsune Kuruma (Torajiro's aunt)
- Gin Maeda as Hiroshi Suwa
- Hayato Nakamura as Mitsuo Suwa
- Hisao Dazai as Boss (Umetarō Katsura)
- Gajirō Satō as Genkō
- Chishū Ryū as Gozen-sama

== Critical appraisal ==
For his performance in Talk of the Town Tora-san and the previous entry in the series, Stage-Struck Tora-san (also 1978) Kiyoshi Atsumi was nominated for Best Actor at the Japan Academy Prize ceremony. Yoji Yamada was also nominated for Best Director at the ceremony for these two film. The German-language site molodezhnaja gives Talk of the Town Tora-san three and a half out of five stars.

== Availability ==
Talk of the Town Tora-san was released theatrically on December 27, 1978. In Japan, the film was released on videotape in 1996, and in DVD format in 1998, 2002 and 2008.
