= Otoko wa Tsurai yo =

Japanese film series

- Poster for the 18th film, Tora's Pure Love (1976)
- Directed by: Yoji Yamada
- Written by: Yoji Yamada; Yoshitaka Asama; et al.
- Starring: Kiyoshi Atsumi; Chieko Baisho; Chishū Ryū
- Cinematography: Tetsuo Takaba
- Music by: Naozumi Yamamoto
- Distributed by: Shochiku (Japan)
- Running time: 110–140 minutes
- Country: Japan
- Language: Japanese

Otoko wa Tsurai yo (男はつらいよ; It's Tough Being a Man) is a Japanese film series starring Kiyoshi Atsumi as Torajirō Kuruma, whose nickname is Tora-san (寅さん), a kind-hearted vagabond who is always unlucky in love. The series itself is often referred to as "Tora-san" by its fans. Spanning 48 installments released between 1969 and 1995, all of the Otoko wa Tsurai yo films except episodes 3 (Azuma Morisaki) and 4 (Shun'ichi Kobayashi) were directed by Yōji Yamada, who also wrote (or co-wrote) all the screenplays.

Each film featured a different leading lady, called a Madonna, and a different region of Japan. (There were also episodes that featured scenes in Arizona and Vienna.) Two films were usually made each year between 1969 and 1989, one for summer and one for New Year release. From 1990 to 1995 only one film was made each year, for New Year release. AnimEigo released a box-set of the first four films in the United States in 2009 under the title "Tora-san". The series holds the Guinness World Record for the longest-running movie series starring a single actor.

The film series had presumed to have ended with Atsumi's declining health and death from lung cancer at age 68, without Tora-san ever settling down and finding domestic happiness. Atsumi was so identified with the Tora-san character that his death was also considered by fans to be the death of Tora-san. Yoji Yamada had decided at the time not to continue the series after Atsumi's death, but reworked a Tora-san script stuck in development as Niji wo Tsukamu Otoko starring Toshiyuki Nishida as a traveling cinema operator. Although Niji was a tribute to movies in general, the final scenes were Yamada's touching, loving posthumous tribute to the Tora-san series and to Atsumi Kiyoshi. Almost all of the principal actors from Otoko wa Tsurai yo have cameos in the Niji film, and the Tora-san character even makes a surprise cameo appearance near the end of the movie. The film ends with a dedication to Kiyoshi Atsumi.

However, the 50th Tora-san film, Tora-san, Wish You Were Here, was released in Japan on December 27, 2019. Atsumi appears throughout the film as flashbacks, using footage from his dozens of performances as Tora-san in the previous films, with the cast members in contemporary Tokyo recalling his presence in their lives.

== Basic plot ==
Torajirō Kuruma (Tora-san) is a traveling salesman whose sole possessions are the contents of a small suitcase, the clothes on his back and some pocket money. He wanders from town to town peddling his wares. He yearns to return to his home in Shibamata, Katsushika, Tokyo.

His family members include Sakura (his kind-hearted half-sister), Hiroshi (Sakura's husband), Mitsuo (Sakura and Hiroshi's son), Tatsuzō (Tora-san's elderly uncle), and Tsune (Tora-san's elderly aunt). Tatsuzō and Tsune run a traditional sweet (dango) shop in Shibamata. The film often begins with Tora-san dreaming of doing grand deeds, anxious to be worthy of his family, usually resulting in disappointment and subsequent awakening.

Tora-san unexpectedly drops in on his family. While they are glad to see him, Tora-san's stay eventually causes some kind of ruckus and usually a violent family argument ensues. He then storms off with his belongings just as suddenly as he arrived.

In each film he falls in love with a "Madonna," an attractive woman, but he invariably ends up heartbroken.

== Television drama version ==
Otoko wa Tsurai yo started off as a TV drama on Fuji Television. Between 1968 and 1969, a total of 26 episodes were aired (though only the first and last episodes are preserved). Episodes were written by Yoji Yamada, Shun Inagaki, Azuma Morisaki, Yuichiro Yamane, and Sekiro Mitsuhata. Episodes were directed by Shunichi Kobayashi, and music was written by Naozumi Yamamoto. The technological director was Toshio Nagashima, the arts producer was Osami Yamamoto, and the designer was Ryusuke Nakata.

Production

The series is slightly based on Marcel Pagnol's Marseille trilogy, except set to a Japanese background.

The title for the drama underwent a series of changes. At first, the title was "Foolish Brother, Wise Sister (愚兄賢妹)," but was dropped due to Fuji Television's disapproval. Based on the song "Iji no sujigane," and the last episode ("Otoko wa Tsurai") of Atsumi Kiyoshi's show "Naite Tamaruka" (泣いてたまるか) , director Shunichi Kobayashi renamed the show Otoko wa Tsurai yo.

Shibamata was chosen as the film's location as it had escaped damage from war; and as result had older, historical scenery.

Plot

Sakura is living with her aunt (Tsune) and uncle (Ryuzō) in the shop Toraya.

In the summer of 1968, Torajirō (Tora) Kuruma (Sakura's brother) comes back to Toraya after 18 years of silence. Unfortunately, Tora angers Sakura as he becomes drunk with friends and causes a ruckus. As a result he decides to go on a trip again.

Before embarking, he stops by temporarily at a teacher (Teacher Sanpo)'s house, and falls in love with Fuyuko, the teacher's daughter. As a result Tora decides to stay in Toraya, where he continuously causes trouble for his sister, uncle, and aunt. Eventually Sakura marries Hiroshi Suwa (a doctor from when Tora was previously in the hospital), Teacher Sanpo dies, and Fuyuko marries Mr. Fujimura, a violinist.

Upset with the previous three events, Tora and his half-brother Yujirō decide to go to Amami Island to hunt for Okinawa Habu (a snake). Unfortunately, this completely backfires, and Torajiro ends up dying due to snakebite. As this news spreads to Toraya, Sakura has a vision in which Tora reappears in Sakura's apartment. As Sakura chases Tora to a park, he suddenly disappears from view, leaving Sakura crying as Hiroshi comforts her.

Aftermath

The fact of Tora dying made the audience angry, and many complaint calls came to Fuji Television. This became one of the arguments to Shochiku, when Yoji tried to persuade Shochiku to make a film on Otoko wa Tsurai yo.

Initially, Shochiku, the distributing agency, was not enthusiastic about the film's prospects but Yōji Yamada's persuasiveness ultimately prevailed. The film series went on to become a huge success with films released every summer and New Years. The series became part of Japanese pop culture. With the exception of Morikawa Shin, the supporting cast of the television version did not reprise their roles in the film series – though Sato Gajiro appears in most of the films as "Gen-chan," Nagayama Aiko is the Madonna in the 5th film and Hisashi Igawa is her suitor.

== Cast ==
=== TV series ===
- Kiyoshi Atsumi as Torajirō Kuruma
- Aiko Nagayama as Sakura [Kuruma, later Suwa] (Torajiro's Sister)
- Shin Morikawa as Ryuzō Kuruma (Torajiro's Uncle)
- Tokuko Sugiyama as Tsune Kuruma (Torajiro's Aunt)
- Orie Satō as Fuyuko Tsubouchi (Tora's "Madonna")
- Eijirō Tōno as Sanpo Tsubouchi (Fuyuko's father)
- Hisashi Igawa as Hiroshi Suwa (Soon-to-become husband of Sakura)
- Gajirō Satō as Yūjirō Kawashima (Torajiro's half-brother)
- Masaaki Tsusaka as Noboru Kawamata (Torajiro's best friend and worker at Toraya)
- Toyoko Takachi as Someko (Torajiro's real mother)

=== Films ===
- Kiyoshi Atsumi as Torajirō Kuruma
- Chieko Baisho as Sakura Suwa
- Gin Maeda as Hiroshi Suwa
- Shin Morikawa – as Ryuzō Kuruma (in films 1 to 8)
- Tatsuo Matsumura – as Ryuzō Kuruma (in films 9 to 13)
- Masami Shimojō as Ryuzō Kuruma (in films 14 to 48)
- Chieko Misaki as Tsune Kuruma
- Hidetaka Yoshioka as Mitsuo Suwa (in films 27 to 50)
- Hisao Dazai as Boss (Umetarō Katsura)
- Chishū Ryū as Gozen-sama
- Gajirō Satō as Genkō

=== Anime ===
- Kōichi Yamadera as Torajirō Kuruma
- Yumi Tōma as Lilly
- Mari Okamoto as Sakura Suwa
- Hōchū Ōtsuka as Hiroshi Suwa
- Minori Yada as Tatsuzō Kuruma
- Mie Azuma as Tsune Kuruma
- Mine Eken as Umetarō Katsura
- Ryūji Saikachi as Gozen-sama
- Naoki Tatsuta as Genkō

== Film series ==
Number	Title	Japan release date	US release date
1	It's Tough Being a Man ("Otoko wa Tsurai yo") (男はつらいよ)	August 27, 1969	July 18, 1974
2	Tora-san's Cherished Mother ("Zoku Otoko wa Tsurai yo") 続・男はつらいよ	November 15, 1969	July 1, 1970
3	Tora-san, His Tender Love ("Otoko wa Tsurai yo: Fuuten no Tora") 男はつらいよ フーテンの寅	January 15, 1970	October 20, 1973
4	Tora-san's Grand Scheme ("Shin Otoko wa Tsurai yo") 新・男はつらいよ	February 27, 1970	July 25, 1973
5	Tora-san's Runaway ("Otoko wa Tsurai yo: Bōkyō hen") 男はつらいよ 望郷篇	August 25, 1970	May 28, 1971
6	Tora-san's Shattered Romance ("Otoko wa Tsurai yo: Junjō hen") 男はつらいよ 純情篇	January 15, 1971	September 1, 1971
7	Tora-san, the Good Samaritan ("Otoko wa Tsurai yo: Funtō hen") 男はつらいよ 奮闘篇	April 28, 1971	June 25, 1975
8	Tora-san's Love Call ("Otoko wa Tsurai yo: Torajirō koiuta") 男はつらいよ 寅次郎恋歌	December 29, 1971	April 14, 1973
9	Tora-san's Dear Old Home ("Otoko wa Tsurai yo: Shibamata bojō") 男はつらいよ 柴又慕情	August 5, 1972	March 10, 1974
10	Tora-san's Dream-Come-True ("Otoko wa Tsurai yo: Torajirō yumemakura") 男はつらいよ 寅次郎夢枕	December 29, 1972	May 1973
11	Tora-san's Forget Me Not ("Otoko wa Tsurai yo: Torajirō wasurenagusa") 男はつらいよ 寅次郎忘れな草	August 4, 1973	January 4, 1974
12	Tora-san Loves an Artist ("Otoko wa Tsurai yo: Watashi no tora-san") 男はつらいよ 私の寅さん	December 26, 1973	May 22, 1974
13	Tora-san's Lovesick ("Otoko wa Tsurai yo: Torajirō Koiyatsure") 男はつらいよ 寅次郎恋やつれ	August 10, 1974	
14	Tora-san's Lullaby ("Otoko wa Tsurai yo: Torajirō Komoriuta") 男はつらいよ 寅次郎子守唄	December 28, 1974	December 1975
15	Tora-san's Rise and Fall ("Otoko wa Tsurai yo: Torajirō Aiaigasa") 男はつらいよ 寅次郎相合い傘	August 2, 1975	June 12, 1977
16	Tora-san, the Intellectual ("Otoko wa Tsurai yo: Katsushika Risshihen") 男はつらいよ 葛飾立志篇	December 27, 1975	December 31, 1976
17	Tora-san's Sunrise and Sunset ("Otoko wa Tsurai yo: Torajirō Yūyake Koyake") 男はつらいよ 寅次郎夕焼け小焼け （仮タイトルは「男はつらいよ 柴又の伊達男」）	July 24, 1976	May 6, 1977
18	Tora's Pure Love ("Otoko wa Tsurai yo: Torajirō Junjōshishū") 男はつらいよ 寅次郎純情詩集	December 25, 1976	
19	Tora-san Meets His Lordship ("Otoko wa Tsurai yo: Torajirō to Tonosama") 男はつらいよ 寅次郎と殿様	August 6, 1977	August 25, 1978
20	Tora-san Plays Cupid ("Otoko wa Tsurai yo: Torajirō Gambare!") 男はつらいよ 寅次郎頑張れ!	December 24, 1977	
21	Stage-Struck Tora-san ("Otoko wa Tsurai yo: Torajirō Wagamichi o Yuku") 男はつらいよ 寅次郎わが道をゆく	August 5, 1978	
22	Talk of the Town Tora-san ("Otoko wa Tsurai yo: Uwasa no Torajirō") 男はつらいよ 噂の寅次郎	December 27, 1978	September 28, 1979
23	Tora-san, the Matchmaker ("Otoko wa Tsurai yo: Tonderu Torajirō") 男はつらいよ 翔んでる寅次郎	August 4, 1979	May 1980
24	Tora-san's Dream of Spring ("Otoko wa Tsurai yo: Torajirō Haru no Yume") 男はつらいよ 寅次郎春の夢	December 28, 1979	June 1, 1980
25	Tora-san's Tropical Fever ("Otoko wa Tsurai yo: Torajirō Haibisukasu no Hana") 男はつらいよ 寅次郎ハイビスカスの花	August 2, 1980	December 26, 1980
26	Foster Daddy, Tora! ("Otoko wa Tsurai yo: Torajirō Kamome Uta") 男はつらいよ 寅次郎かもめ歌	December 28, 1980	
27	Tora-san's Love in Osaka ("Otoko wa Tsurai yo: Naniwa no Koi no Torajirō") 男はつらいよ 浪花の恋の寅次郎	August 8, 1981	January 1, 1982
28	Tora-san's Promise ("Otoko wa Tsurai yo: Torajirō Kamifūsen") 男はつらいよ 寅次郎紙風船	December 29, 1981	June 1982
29	Hearts and Flowers for Tora-san ("Otoko wa Tsurai yo: Torajirō Ajisai no Koi") 男はつらいよ 寅次郎あじさいの恋	August 7, 1982	December 24, 1982
30	Tora-san, the Expert ("Otoko wa Tsurai yo: Hana mo Arashi mo Torajirō") 男はつらいよ 花も嵐も寅次郎	December 28, 1982	
31	Tora-san's Song of Love ("Otoko wa Tsurai yo: Tabi to Onna to Torajirō") 男はつらいよ 旅と女と寅次郎	August 6, 1983	January 20, 1984
32	Tora-san Goes Religious? ("Otoko wa Tsurai yo: Kuchibue o Fuku Torajirō") 男はつらいよ 口笛を吹く寅次郎	December 28, 1983	June 29, 1984
33	Marriage Counselor Tora-san ("Otoko wa Tsurai yo: Yogiri ni Musebu Torajirō") 男はつらいよ 夜霧にむせぶ寅次郎	August 4, 1984	December 21, 1984
34	Tora-san's Forbidden Love ("Otoko wa Tsurai yo: Torajirō Shinjitsu Ichiro") 男はつらいよ 寅次郎真実一路	December 28, 1984	May 1985
35	Tora-san, the Go-Between ("Otoko wa Tsurai yo: Torajirō Ren'aijuku") 男はつらいよ 寅次郎恋愛塾	August 3, 1985	
36	Tora-san's Island Encounter ("Otoko wa Tsurai yo: Shibamata yori Ai o Komete") 男はつらいよ 柴又より愛をこめて	December 28, 1985	
37	Tora-san's Bluebird Fantasy ("Otoko wa Tsurai yo: Shiawase no Aoi Tori") 男はつらいよ 幸福の青い鳥	December 20, 1986	June 1987
38	Tora-san Goes North ("Otoko wa Tsurai yo: Shiretoko Bojō") 男はつらいよ 知床慕情	August 15, 1987	January 11, 1990
39	Tora-san Plays Daddy ("Otoko wa Tsurai yo: Torajirō Monogatari") 男はつらいよ 寅次郎物語	December 26, 1987	
40	Tora-san's Salad-Day Memorial ("Otoko wa Tsurai yo: Torajirō Sarada Kinenbi") 男はつらいよ 寅次郎サラダ記念日	December 24, 1988	
41	Tora-san Goes to Vienna ("Otoko wa Tsurai yo: Torajirō Kokoro no Tabiji") 男はつらいよ 寅次郎心の旅路	August 5, 1989	November 1989
42	Tora-san, My Uncle ("Otoko wa Tsurai yo: Boku no Ojisan") 男はつらいよ ぼくの伯父さん	December 27, 1989	January 11, 1990
43	Tora-san Takes a Vacation ("Otoko wa Tsurai yo: Torajirō no Kyūjitsu") 男はつらいよ 寅次郎の休日	December 22, 1990	
44	Tora-san Confesses ("Otoko wa Tsurai yo: Torajirō no Kokuhaku") 男はつらいよ 寅次郎の告白	December 21, 1991	March 1992
45	Tora-san Makes Excuses ("Otoko wa Tsurai yo: Torajirō no Seishun") 男はつらいよ 寅次郎の青春	December 26, 1992	
46	Tora-san's Matchmaker ("Otoko wa Tsurai yo: Torajirō no Endan") 男はつらいよ 寅次郎の縁談	December 25, 1993	
47	Tora-san's Easy Advice ("Otoko wa Tsurai yo: Haikei, Kuruma Torajirō-sama") 男はつらいよ 拝啓車寅次郎様	December 23, 1994	
48	Tora-san to the Rescue ("Otoko wa Tsurai yo: Torajirō Kurenai no Hana") 男はつらいよ 寅次郎紅の花	December 23, 1995	
49	Tora-san's Tropical Fever Special Edition ("Otoko wa Tsurai yo: Torajirō Haibisukasu no Hana Tokubetsuhen") 男はつらいよ 寅次郎ハイビスカスの花 特別篇	November 22, 1997	
50	Tora-san, Wish You Were Here ("Otoko wa Tsurai yo 50: Okaeri, Torasan") 男はつらいよ50 おかえり、寅さん	December 27, 2019	

== Madonnas ==
Each movie had a female guest star with whom Tora-san would usually fall head over heels (or, in the later movies, play a surrogate father figure). These characters were referred to as "Madonnas". Each Madonna was played by an ingenue who was popular at the time of the movie's release.

Movie No.	Actress	Role
1	Sachiko Mitsumoto	Fuyuko, the Taishaku-ten Priest's (Gozen-sama) daughter
2	Orie Sato	Natsuko Tsubouchi, the English teacher's daughter
3	Michiyo Aratama	O-Shizu, the ryokan kamisan
4	Komaki Kurihara	Haruko Usami, the kindergarten teacher
5	Aiko Nagayama	Setsuko, the fried tofu shopkeeper's daughter
6	Ayako Wakao	Yuko Akashi, the niece of Tsune's cousin's husband
7	Rumi Sakakibara	Hanako Ota, the disabled school assistant from Aomori
8	Junko Ikeuchi	Takako Rokuhara, the coffee shop owner
9	Sayuri Yoshinaga	Utako, the tourist / writer's daughter
10	Kaoru Yachigusa	Chiyo, the barber
11	Ruriko Asaoka	Lily, the lounge singer
12	Keiko Kishi	Ritsuko, the artist
13	Sayuri Yoshinaga	Utako, the writer's daughter
14	Yukiyo Toake	Kyoko, the nurse
15	Ruriko Asaoka	Lily, the lounge singer
16	Fumie Kashiyama	Reiko, the grad student / instructor of archeology
17	Kiwako Taichi	Botan, the geisha
18	Machiko Kyō	Aya Yagyu, Mitsuo's teacher's mother
19	Kyōko Maya	Mariko, the lordship's daughter in law
20	Shiho Fujimura	Fujiko, the electrician's sister
21	Nana Kinomi	Nanako, the SKD revue dancer
22	Reiko Ohara	Sanae, the divorcee
23	Kaori Momoi	Hitomi, the runaway bride
24	Kyōko Kagawa	Keiko, the English teacher's mother
25	Ruriko Asaoka	Lily, the lounge singer
26	Ran Ito	Sumire, the school dropout
27	Keiko Matsuzaka	Fumi, the Osaka geisha
28	Mikiko Otonashi	Mitsue, the tekiya's widow
29	Ayumi Ishida	Kagari, the maid
30	Yūko Tanaka	Keiko Ogawa, the tourist / department store worker
31	Harumi Miyako	Harumi Kyo, the enka singer
32	Keiko Takeshita	Tomoko, the Rendai-ji priest's daughter
33	Rie Nakahara	Fuuko, the hairdresser
34	Reiko Ohara	Fujiko, the missing salaryman's wife
35	Kanako Higuchi	Wakana Egami, the Catholic lady's granddaughter
36	Komaki Kurihara	Machiko, the junior high school teacher
37	Etsuko Shihomi	Miho, the Kabuki actor's daughter
38	Keiko Takeshita	Rinko, the veterinarian's daughter
39	Kumiko Akiyoshi	Takako Takai
40	Yoshiko Mita	Machiko, the doctor
41	Keiko Takeshita	Kumiko, the tourguide
42	Kumiko Goto/ Fumi Dan	Izumi Oikawa, Mitsuo's girlfriend; Izumi's mother
43	Kumiko Goto/ Mari Natsuki	Oikawa Izumi, Mitsuo's girlfriend
44	Kumiko Goto/ Hideko Yoshida	Oikawa Izumi, Mitsuo's girlfriend
45	Kumiko Goto/ Jun Fubuki	Oikawa Izumi, Mitsuo's girlfriend
46	Keiko Matsuzaka	Sakaide Yoko
47	Rino Katase	Miya Noriko, the photographer
48	Ruriko Asaoka	Lily, the lounge singer
49	Ruriko Asaoka	Lily, the lounge singer
