= Tora-san's Forget Me Not =

- Theatrical release poster
- Directed by: Yoji Yamada
- Written by: Yoji Yamada; Akira Miyazaki; Yoshitaka Asama
- Starring: Kiyoshi Atsumi; Ruriko Asaoka
- Cinematography: Tetsuo Takaba
- Edited by: Iwao Ishii
- Music by: Naozumi Yamamoto
- Distributed by: Shochiku
- Release date: August 4, 1973
- Running time: 99 minutes
- Country: Japan
- Language: Japanese

Tora-san's Forget Me Not (男はつらいよ 寅次郎忘れな草, Otoko wa Tsurai yo: Torajirō Wasurenagusa) aka Torasan and his Forget-Me-Not is a 1973 Japanese comedy film directed by Yoji Yamada. It stars Kiyoshi Atsumi as Torajirō Kuruma (Tora-san), and Ruriko Asaoka as his love interest or "Madonna". Tora-san's Forget Me Not is the eleventh entry in the popular, long-running Otoko wa Tsurai yo series.

== Synopsis ==
When Tora-san takes a job at a dairy farm, he becomes infatuated with Lily, a singer. Tora becomes ill, and Lily plans to visit him to tell him his feelings are requited. She is fired from her job and must leave before she can visit Tora-san.

== Cast ==
- Kiyoshi Atsumi as Torajirō
- Chieko Baisho as Sakura
- Ruriko Asaoka as Lily (Kiyoko Matsuoka)
- Tatsuo Matsumura as Kuruma Tatsuzō
- Chieko Misaki as Tsune Kuruma (Torajiro's aunt)
- Gin Maeda as Hiroshi Suwa
- Hayato Nakamura as Mitsuo Suwa
- Hisao Dazai as Boss (Umetarō Katsura)
- Junkichi Orimoto as Kurihara
- Gajirō Satō as Genkō
- Chishū Ryū as Gozen-sama

== Critical appraisal ==
Yuji Yamada was given the Best Director prize at the Mainichi Film Awards for his work on Tora-san's Forget Me Not. Yamada, Akira Miyazaki, and Yoshitaka Asama were also awarded for Best Screenplay at the ceremony. The German-language site molodezhnaja gives Tora-san's Forget Me Not three and a half out of five stars.

== Availability ==
Tora-san's Forget Me Not was released theatrically on August 4, 1973. In Japan, the film was released on videotape in 1995, and in DVD format in 2002 and 2008.

== Bibliography ==
=== English ===
- "OTOKO WA TSURAI YO TORAJIRO WASURENAGUSA (1973)". British Film Institute. Archived from the original on 2012-10-17.
- "OTOKO WA TSURAIYO -TORAJIRO WASURENA-GUSA". Complete Index to World Film.
- Otoko wa tsurai yo: Torajiro wasurenagusa (1973) at IMDb

=== German ===
- "Tora-San's Forget Me Not" (in German). www.molodezhnaja.ch.

=== Japanese ===
- 男はつらいよ 寅次郎忘れな草(1973) (in Japanese). allcinema.net.
- "男はつらいよ 寅次郎忘れな草". Japanese Cinema Database (Agency for Cultural Affairs). Archived from the original on 2012-02-26.
- 男はつらいよ 寅次郎忘れな草 (in Japanese). Japanese Movie Database.
- 男はつらいよ 寅次郎忘れな草 (in Japanese). Kinema Junpo. Archived from the original on 2012-03-09.
