= JMDB =

JMDB can refer to:

- Japanese Movie Database, an online database of Japanese films
- Java Movie Database, an alternative interface for the Internet Movie Database (IMDb) data
- José Manuel Durão Barroso, a Portuguese politician and the 11th President of the European Commission
