= Furusato =

Furusato means "hometown" or "homeland" in Japanese and may refer to:

- "Furusato" (children's song), a 1914 Japanese children's song
- "Furusato" (Morning Musume song), a 1999 song by the Japanese girl group Morning Musume
- Home from the Sea (film), or Furusato, a 1972 Japanese drama film directed by Yoji Yamada
- Furusato, a 1983 Japanese film
- 77560 Furusato, asteroid.
