= Home from the Sea =

Home from the Sea may refer to:

- "Requiem" by Robert Louis Stevenson: "Home is the sailor, home from the sea, and the hunter, home from the hill"
- Home from the Sea, a 1963 memoir by Joy Packer
- Home from the Sea (film), a 1972 Japanese film directed by Yôji Yamada
- Home from the Sea (fantasy novel), a 2012 fantasy novel by Mercedes Lackey
- "Home from the Sea" (Magnum, P.I.), a 1983 television episode
