= Home from the Sea (film) =

- Film poster
- Directed by: Yoji Yamada
- Screenplay by: Yoji Yamada; Akira Miyazaki
- Starring: Hisashi Igawa; Chieko Baisho; Chishū Ryū
- Distributed by: Shochiku
- Release date: October 28, 1972 (Japan)
- Running time: 96 minutes
- Country: Japan
- Language: Japanese

Home from the Sea (Japanese: 故郷, Hepburn: Furusato) is a 1972 Japanese drama film directed by Yoji Yamada and co-written by Yamada with Akira Miyazaki. Set on a small island in the Seto Inland Sea, the film follows the struggles of Seichi and Minko, a couple making a living by transporting rocks by boat and dumping them at construction sites. The film addresses their precarious livelihood and vanishing way of life.

== Cast ==
- Hisashi Igawa as Seiichi Ishizaki
- Chieko Baisho as Tamiko Ishizaki
- Chishū Ryū as Senzô Ishizaki
- Gin Maeda
- Mayumi Ito
- Kiyoshi Atsumi

== Reception ==
In 1973 Hisashi Igawa received the Best Actor Award at the Kinema Junpo Awards, for his role in the film.

The Japan Society describes it as one of Yamada's seminal films.

The film was reviewed by the British Federation of Film Societies. In the journal Film Criticism, it was stated that the film "is virtually a companion piece to The Family."
