= Tatsuo Matsumura (actor) =

Japanese actor (1914–2005)

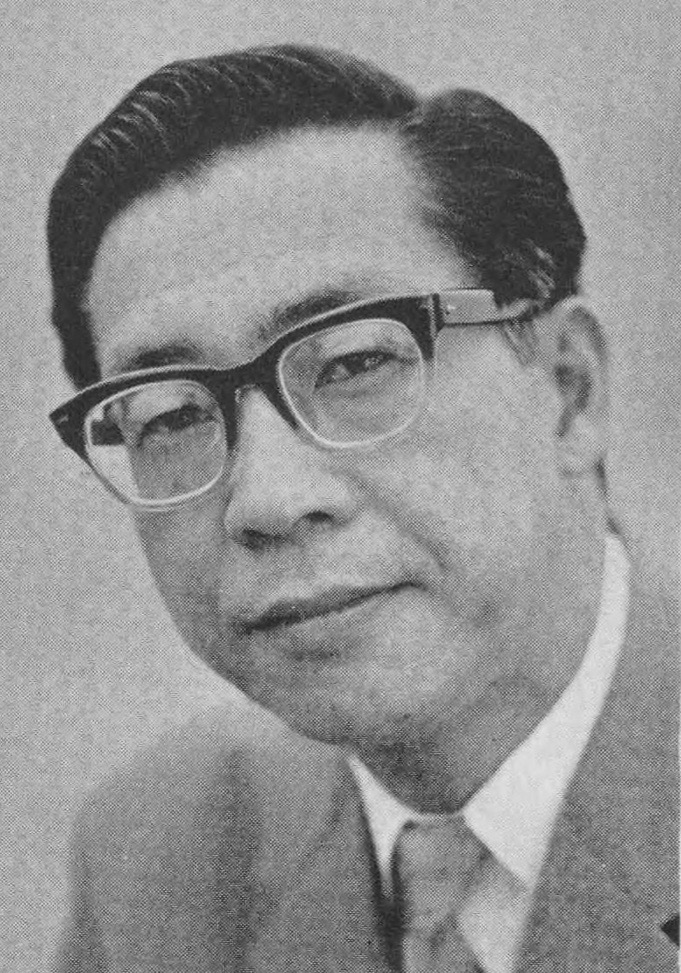
- Born: 18 December 1914; Yokohama, Kanagawa, Japan
- Died: 18 June 2005 (aged 90); Shinjuku, Tokyo, Japan
- Occupation: Actor
- Years active: 1938–2005

Tatsuo Matsumura (松村 達雄, Matsumura Tatsuo; 18 December 1914 – 18 June 2005) was a Japanese actor. He appeared in more than 70 films from 1959 to 2004 and performed in several editions of the film series Otoko wa Tsurai yo.

He graduated from Hosei University. He made his debut in movies with the film Otome no inori directed by Shin Saburi in 1959.

== Filmography ==
=== Films ===
Year	Title	Role	Notes
1960	The Secret of the Telegian	Official	
1960	Salary man Mejiro Sanpei: Teishu no tameiki no maki	Sôma	
1960	Bokutô kitan	Endô	
1960	'Akasaka no shimai' yori: yoru no hada	Kyûzô Nishinaga	
1960	The Human Vapor	Editor Ikeda	
1961	Wakai ôkami		
1961	Wakarete ikiru toki mo		
1961	Tôshi reijô	Father	
1961	Tôkyô yawa	Omatsu	
1961	Ai to honoho to	Lawyer Agawa	
1961	Kurenai no umi		
1961	Toilet buchô		
1961	Kigeki ekimae bentô		
1961	Saigo no kaoyaku		
1962	Kurenai no sora		
1962	Musume to watashi	Uemura	
1962	Nippon musekinin jidai		
1962	King Kong vs. Godzilla	Dr. Makino	
1962	Kyujin ryoko		
1962	Sôtome ke no musume tachi	Policeman	
1962	Harakiri	Seibei	
1962	Wakai kisetsu		
1962	Burari Bura-bura Monogatari		
1963	Roppongi no yoru: aishite aishite	Inagawa	
1963	Nippon jitsuwa jidai		
1963	Kureji sakusen: Sentehisshô		
1963	Daidokoro taiheiki		
1963	Shin meoto zenzai		
1963	Eburi manshi no yûga-na seikatsu		
1964	Echigo Tsutsuishi Oyashirazu	Big landowner	
1964	Hadaka no jûyaku	Hikonosuke Isono	
1964	Zoku kôkô san'nensei	Yûsuke Takatsu	
1965	Warera rettôsei	Mr Iida	
1965	006 wa uwaki no number		
1966	The Guardman: Tokyo Ninja Butai	Kôhei Ôsato	
1967	Rikugun Nakano gakko: Ryu-sango shirei		
1967	Soshiki bôryoku		
1967	Samurai Rebellion	Matsudaira Masakata	
1967	Zatoichi Challenged	Tahe	
1968	I, the Executioner	Chief Detective Kasahara	
1968	Kaibyô nori no numa	Mataemon Tsuyama	
1969	Hiken yaburi	Chisaka Takafusa	
1970	Burabo! Wakadaishô		
1970	Dodes'ka-den	Kyota Watanaka	
1971	Otoko wa tsurai yo: Junjô hen	Doctor Yamashita	
1972	Otoko wa Tsurai yo: Torajirō koiuta	Tatsuzo (Torajiro's uncle)	
1972	Kuro no honryu	Masamichi Wakamiya	
1972	Otoko wa tsurai yo: Torajiro yumemakura	Tatsuzo	
1972	Aa koe naki tomo	Matsumoto	
1973	Otoko wa tsurai yo: Torajiro wasurenagusa	Tatsuzo (Torajiro's uncle)	
1973	Otoko wa tsurai yo: Watashi no tora-san	Tatsuzo (Torajiro's uncle)	
1973	Otoko wa tsurai yo: Torajiro koiyatsure	Tatsuzo (Torajiro's uncle)	
1977	Gokumon-to	Doctor Kôan Murase	
1979	Otoko wa tsurai yo: Tonderu Torajirô	Reikichi Matsuda	
1980	Otoko wa tsurai yo: Torajiro kamome uta	Teacher Hayashi	
1982	Giwaku	Masao Harayama	
1983	Keiji monogatari 2 - Ringo no uta		
1983	Otoko wa tsurai yo: Kuchibue wo fuku Torajirô	Priest	
1985	Otoko wa tsurai yo: Torajirô ren'ai juku	Kyôju	
1987	Otoko wa tsurai yo: Torajiro monogatari	'Oichan'	
1987	Nijushi no hitomi	Principal	
1991	Sensou to seishun	Jinsaku Kiyohara	
1991	My Sons	Terao	
1993	Madadayo	Hyakken Uchida	Lead role
1993	Kokkai e ikô!	Kozaburo takeda	
1994	47 Ronin	Yahei Horibe	
1995	Hiroshima	Prime Minister Kantaro Suzuki	TV movie
1995	Sayonara Nippon!		
1997	Nagareita shichinin	Kaitoh Urabe	
1997	Lie lie Lie	Hirasawa, Seiichiro	
1998	Taian ni butsumetsu	Kazutaro (Tetsuo's father)	
1998	Yûjô - Friendship		
1999	After the Rain	Sekkyo-Bushi Jii, the Old Preacher	
2000	Nagasaki burabura bushi	Yukibei	
2001	Calmi Cuori Appassionati	Seiji Agata	
2004	Milk White	Shigetaro Hayashi	(final film role)

=== Television ===
Year	Title	Role	Notes
1965	Taikōki	Matsunaga Hisahide	Taiga drama
1969	Ten to Chi to	Ōta Sukemasa	Taiga drama
1987	Dokuganryu Masamune	Katagiri Katsumoto	Taiga drama
1999	Furuhata Ninzaburō	Kaemon Araki	Episode 30

== Honours ==
- Order of the Sacred Treasure, 4th Class, Gold Rays with Rosette (1990)
