= It's Tough Being a Man =

- Theatrical poster
- Directed by: Yoji Yamada
- Written by: Yoji Yamada; Azuma Morisaki
- Starring: Kiyoshi Atsumi
- Cinematography: Tetsuo Takaba
- Edited by: Iwao Ishii
- Music by: Naozumi Yamamoto
- Distributed by: Shochiku
- Release date: August 25, 1969
- Running time: 91 minutes
- Country: Japan
- Language: Japanese

It's Tough Being a Man (男はつらいよ, Otoko wa tsurai yo) (Am I Trying) (Tora-san Our Lovable Tramp) is a 1969 Japanese comedy film directed by Yoji Yamada and starring Kiyoshi Atsumi. It is the first entry in the popular, long-running Otoko wa Tsurai yo series.

== Plot ==
After running away after a fight at his home at age 14, Torajiro ("Tora") Kuruma returns for the first time in 20 years to the neighborhood where he was born, Shibamata in Katsushika, Tokyo. He comes back in the middle of Taishakuten temple's Koshin Shinko Festival. After jumping into the festival procession, he has a teary reunion with his uncle, aunt, and his sister Sakura at "Toraya," a Japanese confectionary shop that his aunt and uncle lives and works at.

The next day, he joins his sister at her matchmaking meeting (Miai) with the son of a company president. However, Tora's boorish and drunken behavior at the meeting ruins Sakura's chances of marriage. After getting into a huge physical fight with his uncle over his behavior at the meeting, he leaves the house.

He ends up at Nara the next month, while traveling and guiding abroad guests. While there, he meets and falls in love with a young woman named Fuyuko, the daughter of the Gozen-sama (while on vacation). They return to Shibamata and spend time together as if they were a couple.

Meanwhile, Sakura meets a print shop worker, Hiroshi. However, Tora does not initially approve of the marriage as he had not gone to college. As a result, Hiroshi asks Tora to see if Sakura likes him. This plan unfortunately fails. However, as a result, Hiroshi is able to talk about his honest feelings directly to Sakura. Now loving Hiroshi, Sakura asks Tora if she could get married with Hiroshi, in which Tora finally approves.

While Sakura and Hiroshi get married, Tora's relationship with Fuyuko is fleeting. Though at first they continued to spend time, eventually Fuyuko is introduced to another man (a college professor). To make matters worse, his family (and Taro "Octopus/Tako" Ume) find out about this embarrassing event. Broken-hearted, Tora leaves the house. Though his best friend Noboru comes with him to Ueno Station, stating that he wanted to be like Tora, Tora gets upset with the statement and slaps him.

One year later, Tora writes a letter of advice for Fuyuko, asking her to help take care of his sister and her new baby. Meanwhile Tora reunites with Noboru and spends time together.

== Cast ==
- Kiyoshi Atsumi as Torajiro
- Chieko Baisho as Sakura
- Sachiko Mitsumoto as Fuyuko Tsubouchi
- Chishū Ryū as Gozen-sama
- Takashi Shimura as Hyōichirō Suwa
- Shin Morikawa as Kuruma Tatsuzō
- Gin Maeda as Hiroshi Suwa
- Masaaki Tsusaka as Noboru Kawamata
- Gajirō Satō as Genkichi (Man at the Temple)
- Keiroku Seki as Master of Ceremonies
- Chieko Misaki as Tsune Kuruma (Torajiro's aunt)
- Hisao Dazai as Tarō Ume (Print Shop)
- Shunsuke Ōmi as Manager
- Taichirō Hirokawa as Michio
- Fusatarō Ishijima as Michio's father
- Matsuko Shiga as Michio's mother

== Critical appraisal ==
The Mainichi Film Awards and the Kinema Junpo Awards chose Kiyoshi Atsumi as the Best Actor for his role in It's Tough Being a Man, and Yoji Yamada was given the Best Director prize at the Mainichi Film Awards. The Japanese academic film magazine Kinema Junpo gives It's Tough Being a Man a rating of five out of five stars.

== Availability ==
It's Tough Being a Man was released theatrically on August 27, 1969. In Japan, the film was released on videotape in 1995 and 1996, and in DVD format in 2008. AnimEigo released the film on DVD in the US along with the other first four films in the Otoko wa Tsurai yo series on November 24, 2009.
