= Kiri no Hata =

- Theatrical release poster
- Directed by: Yoji Yamada
- Screenplay by: Shinobu Hashimoto
- Starring: Chieko Baisho; Osamu Takizawa; Shigeru Tsuyuguchi
- Music by: Masaru Sato
- Production company: Shochiku
- Release date: May 29, 1965 (Japan)
- Running time: 111 minutes
- Country: Japan
- Language: Japanese

Kiri no Hata (Japanese: 霧の旗) is a 1965 Japanese crime film directed by Yoji Yamada. It is based on Seichō Matsumoto's novel of the same title.

== Plot ==
A robbery murder of an old moneylender woman occurs in the countryside of Kyushu, and Kiriko Yanagida's older brother, Masao, is arrested as a suspect and brought to justice. Masao is the first discoverer, who borrows money from the victim, and although the situation is overwhelmingly disadvantageous to him, he still pleads not guilty to murder. Kiriko goes to Tokyo and asks Kinzo Otsuka, a well-known attorney from her hometown, to defend her brother, but he refuses.

== Cast ==
- Chieko Baisho as Kiriko Yanagida
- Osamu Takizawa as Kinzo Otsuka
- Michiyo Aratama as Keiko Kawano
- Etsuko Ichihara as Nobuko
- Yūsuke Kawazu as Kenichi Sugita
- Yosuke Kondo as Koichi Abe
- Taketoshi Naito as Shimada
- Nobuo Kaneko as Kawazu
- Shigeru Tsuyuguchi as Masao Yanagida
- Hisashi Igawa as fisherman

== Other adaptation ==
- Kiri no Hata directed by Katsumi Nishikawa in 1978.
