= Kiyoshi Atsumi =

Japanese actor (1928–1996)

- Born: Yasuo Tadokoro (田所 康雄); 10 March 1928; Taito, Tokyo, Japan
- Died: 4 August 1996 (aged 68); Bunkyo, Tokyo, Japan
- Years active: 1951–1996
- Awards: People's Honour Award (1996)

Kiyoshi Atsumi (Japanese: 渥美 清, Hepburn: Atsumi Kiyoshi), born Yasuo Tadokoro (田所 康雄, Tadokoro Yasuo; 10 March 1928 – 4 August 1996), was a Japanese actor. He is best known for portraying Tora-san in the Japanese comedy film series Otoko wa Tsurai yo, a role he played 48 times over 26 years.

== Life and career ==
Atsumi was born in Tokyo suffering from childhood malnutrition due to conditions in wartime. The resulting illnesses led him to re-take 3rd and 4th grade to recover, listening to Musei Tokugawa and rakugo on the radio. In 1942 the outbreak of war with the US forced his middle school class into a factory producing radiators for the military. He later graduated in 1945 but his family home was destroyed during the Tokyo firebombing.

After his initial ambitions of becoming a cargo sailor were opposed by his mother, Atsumi looked to acting after joining a traveling troop of actors with a friend. He started his career in 1951 as a comedian at a strip-show theater in Asakusa. A bout of tuberculosis resulted in a lobectomy, spending 2 years at a Saitama sanitorium to recover. He made his debut on TV in 1956 and on film in 1957. His vivid performance of a lovable, innocent man in the film "Dear Mr. Emperor" (Haikei Tenno-Heika-Sama) in 1963 established his reputation as an actor. He developed a liking to Africa after spending 4 months there to film The Song of Bwana Toshi in 1965, vacationing to Tanzania multiple times afterwards.

Later he became the star of the highly popular Tora-san series of films. The original run ended with Tora dying after being bit by a Japanese pit viper. A flood of viewer complaints forced Shochiku to commission a movie, therefore making the show into a series. His portrayal of the main characters lasted from the original Otoko wa Tsurai yo (translated in English as 'It's Tough being a Man') in 1969 to the 48th film released in 1995, the year before his death.

Due to declining health after 1990 filming scenes where Atsumi was standing were gradually cut down. In 1991 he was diagnosed with liver cancer which later metastized to his lungs in 1994. He died on August 8, 1996, at Juntendo University Hospital, Tokyo. His private funeral included Yoji Yamada and Chieko Baisho as attendees. The enduring success of the series made him synonymous with the Tora-san character, and when he died many Japanese regarded his death as the death of the character Tora-san, not the death of the actor Yasuo Tadokoro or Kiyoshi Atsumi.

== Selected filmography ==
- Otorasan daihanjô (1958) - Hatta
- Shima no sehiro no oyabun-shû (1961)
- Koshinuke nyûipin sodô (1961)
- Daite chôdai (1961)
- Atomic no obon: Surimasuwayo no maki (1961)
- Tôshi reijô (1961) - Nozaki
- Atomic no obon, onna oyabuntaiketsu no maki (1961)
- Wakaki ni ho Jirocho: Tokaido no tsumujikaze (1962)
- Nippon no obaachan (1962) - Policeman
- Oedo Hyobanji Binan no Kaoyaku (1962) - Ushi
- Kigeki: Danchi oyabun (1962)
- Ottamage ningyo monogatari (1962) - Ginji
- Sarariman Isshin Tasuke (1962)
- Attack Squadron! (1963)
- Utae Wakôdotachi (1963) - Taxi driver
- Mushukunin-betsuchô (1963) - Ichibei
- Tsumujikaze (1963)
- Haikei tenno heika sama (1963) - Shosuke Yamada
- Gendaikko (1963) - Actor (uncredited)
- Okashina yatsu (1963) - Kashô Sanyûtei
- Zoku Haikei Tenno Heika Sama (1964) - Zensuke yamaguchi
- Gendai kane monogatari (1964)
- Haikei sôri daijin sama (1964)
- Ore wa bodigado (1964)
- Sanpo suru reikyusha (1964)
- Baka marudashi (1964)
- Bwana Toshi no uta (1965) - Toshi
- Izuko e (1966)
- Un ga yoke rya (1966)
- Kutsukake Tokijiro - yukyo ippiki (1966)
- Ohana han (1966)
- Kaachan to 11-nin no kodomo (1966) - Teiji Yoshida
- Chichiko gusa (1967)
- Kigeki: Kyûkô ressha (1967)
- Kigeki: Dantai ressha (1967)
- Otoko nara furimukuna (1967)
- Neon taiheiki (1968)
- Kigeki hachurui (1968) - Seki
- Moetsukita chizu (1968) - Tashiro
- Nippon gerira jidai (1968)
- Hakuchû dôdô (1968) - Katsuji 'Watakatsu' Watanabe
- Gion matsuri (1968)
- Sukurappu shûdan (1968) - Hose
- Kigeki hatsumoude resha (1968) - Ueda
- Otoko wa tsurai yo (1969) - Torajirô Kuruma
- Kigeki: Onna wa dokyô (1969) - Tsutomu
- Zoku otoko wa tsurai yo (1969) - Torajirô Kuruma
- Otoko wa tsurai yo: Fûten no Tora (1970) - Torajirô Kuruma
- Shin otoko wa tsurai yo (1970) - Torajirô Kuruma
- Kigeki: Otoko wa aikyo (1970) - Okera no Goro
- Otoko wa tsurai yo: Boukyou hen (1970) - Torajiro Kuruma
- Tora! Tora! Tora! (1970) - Cook #1 (Japanese version only) (uncredited)
- Where Spring Comes Late (1970)
- Otoko wa tsurai yo: Junjô hen (1971) - Torajirô Kuruma
- Otoko wa tsurai yo: Funto hen (1971) - Torajiro Kuruma
- Otoko wa tsurai yo: Torajiro koiuta (1971) - Torajiro Kuruma
- Yaruzô mite ore tamegorô (1971)
- Otoko wa tsurai yo: Shibamata bojo (1972) - Torajiro Kuruma
- Furusato (1972) - Matsushita
- Otoko wa tsurai yo: Torajiro yumemakura (1972) - Torajiro Kuruma
- Aa koe naki tomo (1972) - Tamiji Nishiyama
- Otoko wa tsurai yo: Torajiro wasurenagusa (1973) - Torajiro Kuruma
- Otoko wa tsurai yo: Watashi no tora-san (1973) - Torajiro Kuruma
- Tokyo do mannaka (1974)
- Otoko wa tsurai yo: Torajiro koiyatsure (1974) - Torajiro Kuruma
- Castle of Sand (1974) - Movie Theater Manager
- Otoko wa tsurai yo: Torajiro komoriuta (1974) - Torajiro Kuruma
- Otoko wa tsurai yo: Torajiro aiaigasa (1975) - Torajiro Kuruma
- Harakara (1975)
- Otoko wa tsurai yo: Katsushika risshi hen (1975) - Torajiro Kuruma
- Otoko wa tsurai yo: Torajiro yuuyake koyake (1976) - Torajiro Kuruma
- Otoko wa tsurai yo: Torajirô junjô shishû (1976) - Torajiro Kuruma
- Otoko wa tsurai yo: Torajirô to tonosama (1977) - Torajiro Kuruma
- Shiawase no kiiroi hankachi (1977) - Watanabe kakarichô
- Yatsuhaka-mura (1977) - Kôsuke Kindaichi
- Otoko wa tsurai yo: Torajiro gambare! (1977) - Torajiro Kuruma
- Otoko wa tsurai yo: Torajiro wagamichi wo yuku (1978) - Torajiro Kuruma
- Kôtei no inai hachigatsu (1978) - Kubo
- Otoko wa tsurai yo: Uwasa no Torajirô (1978) - Torajiro Kuruma
- Otoko wa tsurai yo: Tonderu Torajirô (1979) - Torajirô Kuruma
- Ore-tachi no kokyogaku (1979)
- Otoko wa tsurai yo: Torajirô haru no yume (1979) - Torajirô Kuruma
- Haruka naru yama no yobigoe (1980)
- Otoko wa tsurai yo: Torajiro haibisukasu no hana (1980) - Torajiro Kuruma
- Otoko wa tsurai yo: Torajiro kamome uta (1980) - Torajiro Kuruma
- Otoko wa tsurai yo: Naniwa no koi no Torajirô (1981) - Torajirô Kuruma
- Otoko wa tsurai yo: Torajiro kamifusen (1981) - Torajiro Kuruma
- Otoko wa tsurai yo: Torajiro ajisai no koi (1982) - Torajiro Kuruma
- Otoko wa tsurai yo: Hana mo arashi mo Torajirô (1982) - Torajirô Kuruma
- Otoko wa tsurai yo: Tabi to onna to Torajirô (1983) - Torajirô Kuruma
- Otoko wa tsurai yo: Kuchibue wo fuku Torajirô (1983) - Torajiro Kuruma
- Otoko wa tsurai yo: Yogiri ni musebu torajiro (1984) - Torajiro Kuruma
- Otoko wa tsurai yo: Torajirô shinjitsu ichiro (1984) - Torajirô Kuruma
- Otoko wa tsurai yo: Torajirô ren'ai juku (1985) - Torajirô Kuruma
- Otoko wa tsurai yo: Shibamata yori ai wo komete (1985) - Torajiro Kuruma
- Final Take (1986) - Kihachi
- Otoko wa tsurai yo: Shiawase no aoi tori (1986) - Torajiro Kuruma
- Otoko wa tsurai yo: Shiretoko bojô (1987) - Torajirô Kuruma
- Otoko wa tsurai yo: Torajiro monogatari (1987) - Torajiro Kuruma
- Nijushi no hitomi (1987) - Narrator
- Dauntaun hirozu (1988) - Havaosuke the dormitory cook
- Otoko wa tsurai yo: Torajiro sarada kinenbi (1988) - Torajiro Kuruma
- Otoko wa tsurai yo: Torajiro kokoro no tabiji (1989) - Torajiro Kuruma
- Otoko wa tsurai yo: Boku no ojisan (1989) - Torajiro Kuruma
- Otoko wa tsurai yo: Torajiro no kyuujitsu (1990) - Torajiro Kuruma
- Otoko wa tsurai yo: Torajiro no kokuhaku (1991) - Torajiro Kuruma
- Otoko wa tsurai yo: Torajiro no seishun (1992) - Torajiro Kuruma
- A Class to Remember (1993)
- Otoko wa tsurai yo: Torajiro no endan (1993) - Torajiro Kuruma
- Otoko wa tsurai yo: Haikei, Kuruma Torajiro sama (1994) - Torajiro Kuruma
- Otoko wa tsurai yo: Torajiro kurenai no hana (1995) - Torajiro Kuruma
- Otoko wa tsurai yo: Torajiro haibisukasu no hana tokubetsu-hen (1997) - Torajiro Kuruma (final film role)

== Honours ==
- Medal with Purple Ribbon (1988)
- People's Honour Award (1996)
