= Taisaku Akino =

Japanese actor

- Born: February 14, 1943 (age 83); Tokyo, Japan
- Occupation: Actor
- Years active: 1967–present

Taisaku Akino (Japanese: 秋野 太作, Hepburn: Akino Taisaku; born Masaaki Tsusaka, February 14, 1943 in Tokyo, Japan) is a Japanese actor.

He grew up in Komagome, Toshima ward. In 1967, he made his acting debut in the Kinoshita Keisuke Theater production of "Kinenju". In 1974, he married the actress Kiwako Taichi. They quickly divorced. In 1975, he married a former Takarasienne singer Hekiren On (Mandarin: 温 碧蓮, Pinyin: Wēn Bìlián) whose father had migrated from Taipei to Osaka. Hekiren Tsusaka was then renamed Akiko Tsusaka. They raised three children: Takuji W. Tsusaka, Yuri Okumoto, and Saki Tsusaka.

== Selected filmography ==
=== Films ===
- It's Tough Being a Man (1969) as Kawamata Noboru
- Tora-san's Cherished Mother (1969) as Kawamata Noboru
- Tora-san's Grand Scheme (1970) as Kawamata Noboru
- Tora-san's Dear Old Home (1972) as Kawamata Noboru
- Tora-san's Dream-Come-True (1972) as Kawamata Noboru
- Hissatsu Shikakenin Baian Arijigoku (1973)
- Pink Lady no Katsudō Daishashin (1978)
- Marriage Counselor Tora-san (1984) as Kawamata Noboru
- Bloom in the Moonlight (1993) as Sakunosuke Koyama
- Agitator (2001)
- Izo (2004)
- Bunny Drop (2011)
- Teppen no Ken (2024)
- Our Journey for 50 Years (2026) as Shinroku Kumazawa

=== Television ===
- Hissatsu series
  - Hissatsu Shikakenin (1972–73) as Misaki no Senzō
  - Hissatsu Shiokinin (1973) as Ohirome no Hanji
  - Tasukenin Hashiru (1973074) as Rikichi
  - Kurayami Shitomenin (1974) as Hanji
- Oretachi no Tabi (1975) as Shinroku Kumazawa
- Edo no Kaze (1975-1978) as Sanai
- Oretachi wa Tenshi da! (1979) as Suehiro Teppei
