= Kiwako Taichi =

Japanese actress

- Taichi in the film Kuroneko
- Born: 2 December 1943; Tokyo, Japan
- Died: 13 October 1992 (aged 48); Shizuoka, Japan
- Other name: Taeko Shimura
- Occupation: Actress
- Years active: 1967–1985

Kiwako Taichi (太地 喜和子, Taichi Kiwako; 2 December 1943 – 13 October 1992) was a Japanese film actress. She appeared in 20 films between 1967 and 1985.

== Biography ==
Kiwako Taichi was born in Tokyo on 2 December 1943. She graduated Shoin Junior and Senior High School and, after training in the Haiyuza Theatre Company, she joined Bungakuza in 1967. Appearing in such plays as Yabuhara Kengyō and Gan no Tera, she was hailed as a potential successor to Haruko Sugimura. In 1970, she married actor Taisaku Akino. They later divorced. she had a relationship with Rentaro Mukai but ended because her adoptive parents were against the relationship.

She died in a car accident in Ito, Shizuoka on 13 October 1992 while working there with Bungakuza.

== Partial filmography ==
=== Film ===
- Kawa jean blues (1961)
- Beranme Nakanori-san (1961)
- Akuma no temari-uta (1961) - Satoko Nire
- Minyo no tabi: Sakurajima Otemoyan (1962)
- Tekka wakashu (1962)
- Hibari no Hahakoi Guitar (1962)
- Hana o kuu mushi (1967) - Nami Aoki
- Kuroneko (1968) - Shige (Daughter-in-Law)
- Dankon (1969) - Saori
- Hitorikko (1969)
- The Scandalous Adventures of Buraikan (1970) - Namiji
- Shokkaku (1970) - Yae
- Yakuza Zessyō (1970) - Kanae
- Live Today, Die Tomorrow! (1970) - Friend
- If You Were Young: Rage (1970)
- Konto Gojugo-go to Miko no zettai zetsumei (1971) - Momoyo Tashiro
- Kaoyaku (1971) - Mayumi Takigawa
- Ningen Hyoteki (1971)
- Kokuhakuteki joyûron (1971) - Rie
- Zatoichi in Desperation (1972) - Nishikigi
- Akumyo: shima arashi (1974) - Oteru
- The Last Samurai (1974) - Ohide
- Kigeki-otoko no ude dameshi (1974)
- Kigeki: onna no naki-dokoro (1975)
- Cross the Rubicon! (1975) - Shizuko
- Tora-san's Sunrise and Sunset (1976) - Botan
- Gokumon-to (1977) - Tomoe Kitô - Gihei's Wife
- Shinjuku baka monogatari (1977)
- Kôtei no inai hachigatsu (1978) - Ayako Nakagami
- Fire Festival (1985) - Kimiko
- Chichi (1988)

=== Television ===
- National Kid (1960-1961) - Tyako
- Kunitori Monogatari (1973) - Nene
- Zatoichi Series: The Kannon Statue That was Bound (縛られ観音ゆきずり旅, 1974)
