= Yoji Yamada =

Japanese film director (born 1931)

Yōji Yamada
- 山田 洋次
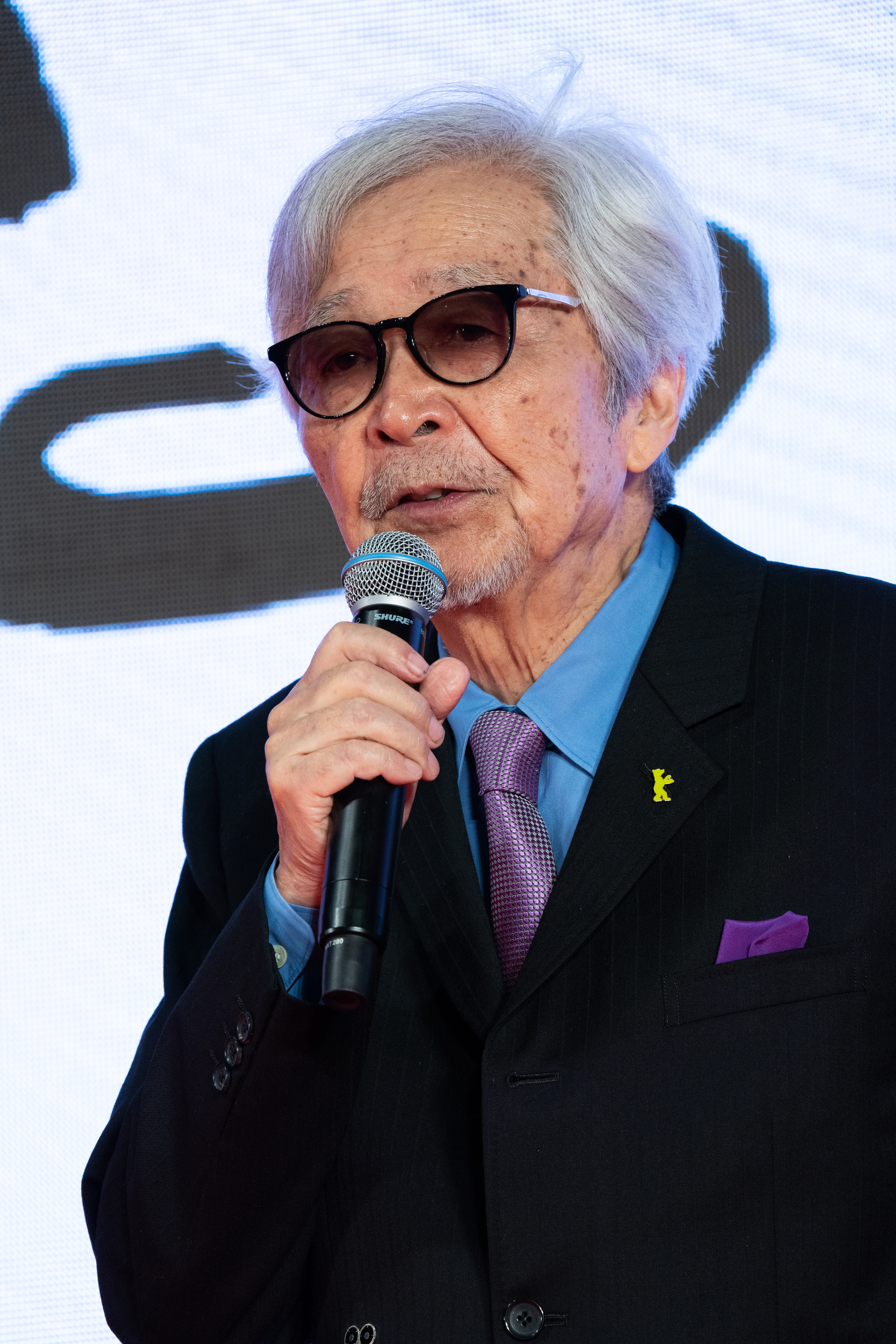
- Yamada in 2019
- Born: 13 September 1931 (age 94); Toyonaka, Japan
- Occupation: Filmmaker
- Years active: 1961–present

Yoji Yamada (山田 洋次, Yamada Yōji; born 13 September 1931) is a Japanese filmmaker best known for his film series Otoko wa Tsurai yo and the Samurai Trilogy (The Twilight Samurai, The Hidden Blade, and Love and Honor). He has directed 91 films, and is well regarded by critics around the world. His Tora-san series holds the Guinness World Record for the longest-running film series starring the same actor.

== Early life ==
Yoji Yamada was born on 13 September 1931 in Toyonaka, Osaka. Due to his father's job as an engineer for the South Manchuria Railway, he was brought up in the Chinese city of Dalian from the age of two. Following the end of World War II, he returned to Japan and subsequently lived in Ube, Yamaguchi. After receiving his degree from Tokyo University in 1954, he joined the film studio Shochiku and worked under filmmaker Yoshitaro Nomura as a screenwriter and assistant director.

== Career ==
Yamada wrote his first screenplay in 1958, and directed his first movie, a drama titled Nikai no Tanin, in 1961. He once served as president of the Directors Guild of Japan, and is currently a guest professor of Ritsumeikan University. He continues to write and direct; his latest film Tokyo Taxi was released in November 2025, two months after he turned 94.

Known in Japan under the title Otoko wa Tsurai yo, his Tora-san series features traveling merchant Torajirō, who is always unlucky in love. Since the lead role in every Tora-san movie was played by Kiyoshi Atsumi, his death in 1996 put an end to the series and Yamada moved on to other movies. Although Yamada is known for his long-running series of movies—four films in the A Class to Remember series, 13 in the Free and Easy (Tsuribaka Nisshi) series—none has reached the prolific numbers of the Tora-san series. Over a period of about 25 years, 48 Tora-san films were made, all of them starring Atsumi, and the majority written and directed by Yamada.

== Notable awards ==
Yamada has received multiple accolades in Japan, including: the Minister of Education Award for Fine Arts and the Mainichi Art Award (1970); the Kikuchi Kan Prize (1972); the Medal with Purple Ribbon and the Asahi Prize (1996); the Order of the Rising Sun, Gold Rays with Rosette (2002); membership in the Japan Art Academy (2008); and the Order of Culture (2012).

His movies have won the Best Picture award at the Japanese Academy Awards four times: in 1977 for The Yellow Handkerchief, in 1991 for My Sons, in 1993 for A Class to Remember, and in 2002 for The Twilight Samurai, which was nominated for the 76th Academy Awards' Best Foreign Language Film. He won the Japan Academy Prize for Director of the Year three times. His 1984 film, Tora-san's Forbidden Love, was nominated for the Golden Prize at the 14th Moscow International Film Festival.

His 2004 film, The Hidden Blade, was nominated for sixteen awards and won three. In 2010, Yamada was honored at the 2010 Berlin Film Festival with a screening of his latest film Otōto during the awards ceremony, as well as receiving a Berlinale Camera award for his numerous contributions to the festival's program.

The 2025 Tokyo International Film Festival presented its Lifetime Achievement Award to Yamada.

== Works ==
=== Films ===
- Nikai no Tanin (1961)
- Shitamachi no Taiyo (1963)
- Baka Marudashi (1964)
- Iikagen Baka (1964)
- Baka ga Sensha de Yattekuru (1964)
- Kiri no Hata (1965)
- Un ga Yokerya (1966)
- Natsukashii Fūraibō (1966)
- Kyu-chan no Dekkai Yume (1967)
- Ai no Sanka (1967)
- Kigeki Ippatsu Shobu (1967)
- Hana Hajime no Ippatsu Daibōken (1968)
- Fukeba Tobuyona Otoko daga (1968)
- Kigeki Ippatsu Daihissho (1969)
- It's Tough Being a Man (1969)
- Tora-San's Cherished Mother (1969)
- Tora-san's Runaway (1970)
- Kazoku (Family) (1970)
- Tora-san's Shattered Romance (1971)
- Tora-san, the Good Samaritan (1971)
- Tora-san's Love Call (1971)
- Tora-san's Dear Old Home (1972)
- Tora-san's Dream-Come-True (1972)
- Home From The Sea (1972)
- Tora-san's Forget Me Not (1973)
- Tora-san Loves an Artist (1973)
- Tora-san's Lovesick (1974)
- Tora-san's Lullaby (1974)
- Tora-san's Rise and Fall (1975)
- Tora-san, the Intellectual (1975)
- Harakara (1975)
- Tora-san's Sunrise and Sunset (1976)
- Tora's Pure Love (1976)
- Tora-san Meets His Lordship (1977)
- Tora-san Plays Cupid (1977)
- The Yellow Handkerchief (1977)
- Stage-Struck Tora-san (1978)
- Talk of the Town Tora-san (1978)
- Tora-san, the Matchmaker (1979)
- Tora-san's Dream of Spring (1979)
- Tora's Tropical Fever (1980)
- Foster Daddy, Tora! (1980)
- A Distant Cry from Spring (1980)
- Tora-san's Love in Osaka (1981)
- Shunmao Monogatari Taotao (1981)
- Tora-san's Promise (1981)
- Hearts and Flowers for Tora-san (1982)
- Tora-san, the Expert (1982)
- Tora-san's Song of Love (1983)
- Tora-san Goes Religious? (1983)
- Marriage Counselor Tora-san (1984)
- Tora-san, the Go-Between (1985)
- Tora-san's Island Encounter (1985)
- Tora-san's Bluebird Fantasy (1986)
- Final Take (1986)
- Tora-san Goes North (1987)
- Tora-san Plays Daddy (1987)
- Tora-san's Salad-Day Memorial (1988)
- Hope and Pain (1988)
- Tora-San Goes to Vienna (1989)
- Tora-san, My Uncle (1989)
- Tora-san Takes a Vacation (1990)
- My Sons (1991)
- Tora-san Confesses (1991)
- Tora-San Makes Excuses (1992)
- A Class to Remember (1993)
- Tora-san's Matchmaker (1993)
- Tora-san's Easy Advice (1994)
- Tora-san to the Rescue (1995)
- A Class to Remember II (1996)
- Niji wo Tsukamu Otoko (1996)
- Niji wo Tsukamu Otoko Nangoku Funtō hen (1997)
- A Class to Remember III (1998)
- A Class to Remember IV (2000)
- The Twilight Samurai (2002)
- The Hidden Blade (2004)
- Love and Honor (2006)
- Kabei: Our Mother (2008)
- Otōto (2010)
- Kyoto Story (2010)
- Tokyo Family (2013)
- The Little House (2014)
- Nagasaki: Memories of My Son (2015)
- What a Wonderful Family! (2016)
- What a Wonderful Family! 2 (2017)
- What a Wonderful Family! 3: My Wife, My Life (2018)
- Tora-san, Wish You Were Here (2019)
- It's a Flickering Life (2021)
- Mom, Is That You?! (2023)
- Tokyo Taxi (2025)

=== Screenplays ===
- Castle of Sand (1974)
- Tsuribaka Nisshi Series (1988–2009)
- Deguchi no Nai Umi (2006)

== Honours ==
- Medal with Purple Ribbon (1996)
- Order of the Rising Sun, 4th Class, Gold Rays with Rosette (2002)
- Person of Cultural Merit (2004)
- Order of Culture (2012)
- Honorary citizen of Tokyo (2014)
- Lifetime Achievement Award at 38th Tokyo International Film Festival in 2025.
