= Masami Shimojō =

Japanese actor (1915–2004)

- Born: 26 August 1915; Busan, Japan
- Died: 25 July 2004 (aged 88); Tokyo, Japan
- Occupation: Actor
- Years active: 1936–1996
- Children: Atomu Shimojō

Masami Shimojō (下條正巳, Shimojō Masami; 26 August 1915 – 25 July 2004) was a Japanese film and stage actor. He appeared in more than 100 films.

== Career ==
Hoping to become a film director, Shimojō traveled to Tokyo in 1935 but ended up joining a theater troupe, debuting on stage in 1936. He made his film debut in 1940, but continued on stage well after World War II, primarily as a member of Gekidan Mingei. He was most known, however, for playing the uncle of Torajiro Kuruma in the long-running Otoko wa Tsurai yo series.

== Selected filmography ==
=== Film ===
Year	Title	Role	Notes
1955	Wolf		
1955	The Heart		
1956	Shirogane Shinjū		
1974	Tora-san's Lullaby		
1975	Tora-san, the Intellectual		
1975	Tora-san's Rise and Fall		
1976	Tora's Pure Love		
1977	Tora-san Plays Cupid		
1977	Tora-san Meets His Lordship		
1977	Tora-san's Sunrise and Sunset		
1978	Stage-Struck Tora-san		
1979	Tora-san's Dream of Spring		
1979	Tora-san, the Matchmaker		
1980	Tora's Tropical Fever		
1982	Tora-san, the Expert		
1988	Oracion		
1992	Tora-san Makes Excuses		
1995	Tora-san to the Rescue		

=== Television ===
Year	Title	Role	Notes
1963	Hana no Shōgai	Miura Hokuan	Taiga drama
1972	Shin Heike Monogatari	Fujiwara no Tokinobu	Taiga drama
1979	Fumō Chitai	Kagawa	
