= Complete Index to World Film =

Online film information database

Complete Index to World Film since 1895
- Website type: Online film database
- Available in: English
- Owner: Alan Goble
- Creator: Alan Goble
- Website: www.citwf.com
- Commercial: No
- Launched: 2004; 22 years ago
- Current status: Active

The Complete Index to World Film (CITWF or citwf.com) is an online database containing information related to film productions worldwide. The database has been compiled by Alan Goble and Valan Publishing and has been available online since 2004.

The project originated as a print reference work. In 1990, The Complete Index to World Film Since 1895 was published in two volumes by Bowker Saur (ISBN 1857392523). A CD-ROM edition followed in 1995.

According to Guinness World Records, the database has been recognised as the largest published film-related database, containing over 756,000 title entries.

== Overview ==
The Complete Index to World Film contains information on more than 518,000 films produced in over 175 countries between 1888 and 2019. The database includes production details, cast and crew information, and references to related publications.

A subscription version is available to libraries and institutions. This version contains additional reference material, including more than 580,000 citations to books and academic journals.

== Alan Goble ==
Title (Year) Director. Place is a 2023 documentary portrait of Alan Goble, the creator of the database.

== Related websites ==
- First Century of Cinema
- Complete Index to World Film

== Related works ==
Goble, Alan. The Complete Index to Literary Sources in Film. Walter de Gruyter, 1999. LCCN 99-58986 doi:10.1515/9783110951943

== See also ==
- AllMovie
- Internet Movie Database
- Newark Athlete, an 1891 film directed by William Kennedy Dickson
