= Japanese Movie Database =

Online database of films and actors

- Screenshot of the welcome page for the Japanese Movie Database
- Website type: Online Japanese movie databases
- Available in: Japanese
- Owner: Y. Nomura
- Creator: Y. Nomura
- Website: www.jmdb.ne.jp
- Registration: Optional
- Launched: 1997; 29 years ago
- Current status: Not active

The Japanese Movie Database (日本映画データベース, Nihon Eiga Dētabēsu), more commonly known as simply JMDb, is an online database of information about Japanese movies, actors, and production crew personnel. It is similar to the Internet Movie Database but lists only those films initially released in Japan. Y. Nomura started the site in 1997, and it contains movies from 1899 (Second Year of Movies in Japan recorded) to the present day.

== See also ==
- IMDb
