= Chieko Misaki =

Japanese actress (1921–2012)

- Born: 三崎千恵子; February 20, 1921; Toshima, Tokyo, Japan
- Died: February 13, 2012 (aged 90); Kamakura, Japan
- Occupations: Actor, singer
- Years active: 1955–2001
- Known for: It's Tough Being a Man

Chieko Misaki (三崎千恵子, Misaki Chieko; 20 February 1921 – 13 February 2012) was a Japanese actress and singer known for her role as aunt Tsune Kuruma in the long-running It's Tough Being a Man film series.

== Life ==
Misaki was born in an area of Tokyo and her family had a vegetable business. She was educated at Toyo Girls' High School and then went to work in the Shirokiya department store. She broke into performing when she was employed as a singer by the entertainment company Shochiku in 1939.

In 1950 she began giving Kimono shows with the first ever post-war example in the Mitsukoshi store.

She went to work for the Mingei theatre company in 1951.

The films she appeared in include "Family" and "Like the Flow of the River". She appeared in the 1969 film comedy It's Tough Being a Man as the protagonist's aunt. This was the first of over forty movies with the same lead character of Toya who in each film finds and fails to get a girl. Misaki has the repeating role as his aunt.

Her character Obachan was married to Oichan who was played by Masami Shimojo ran the shop that sold dangos (dumplings made with rice flour). Toya and his family were meant to never get old - he was meant to make been born in 1945 but his sister had a new born baby and as each film was released these characters moved from newly weds to mature parents with a grown up son. Meanwhile, the couple at the dumpling shop moved from middle age to having white hair. The 48th film, Tora-san to the Rescue, was released in 1995 with her still as the lead person's aunt.

== Private life ==
She married another actor Masayoshi Miyasaka.
