= Gin Maeda =

Japanese actor (born 1944)

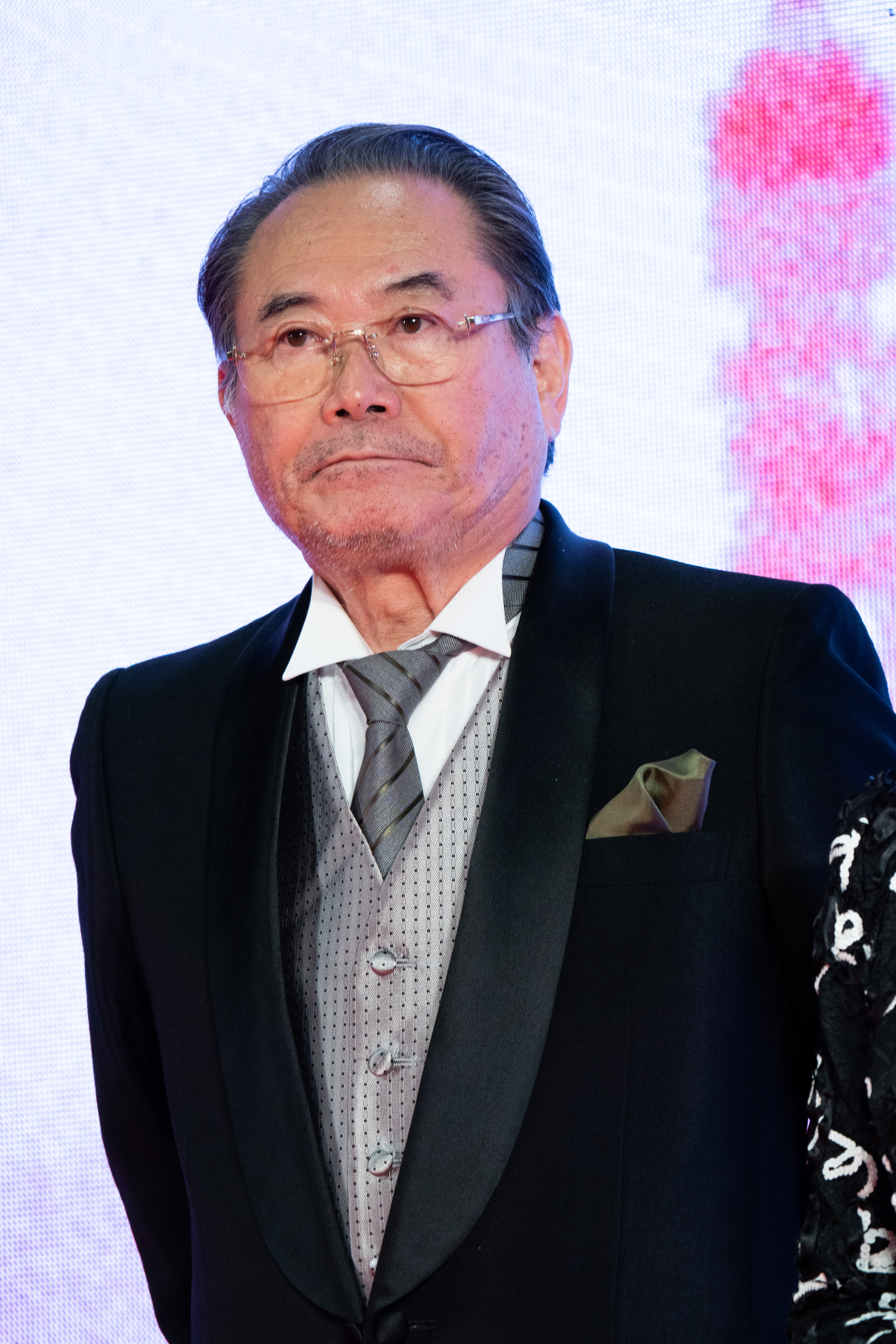
Gin Maeda

Gin Maeda (前田吟, Maeda Gin) (born February 21, 1944) is a Japanese actor. He had a regular role in the Otoko wa Tsurai yo films, beginning with the first in the series (1969), as Sakura's husband.

== Filmography ==
=== Film ===
- Otoko wa Tsurai yo series (1969–2019), Hiroshi Suwa
- If You Were Young: Rage (1970), Asao
- Where Spring Comes Late (1970), Kazami-ryoku
- Battles Without Honor and Humanity: Deadly Fight in Hiroshima (1973), Koichi Shimada
- Mount Hakkoda (1977), Saitō
- Hometown (1983), Teacher Tani
- Final Take (1986), Yuki's husband
- No Worries on the Recruit Front (1991), Interviewer
- Pride (1998), Sadao Akamatsu
- Break Through! (2005), Motoki's father
- The Floating Castle (2012), Tahee
- Little Maestra (2012), Tatsuji Minatogawa
- Midsummer's Equation (2013), Shigeharu Kawabata
- R100 (2013), Kiichirō Sugiura
- March Comes in Like a Lion (2017), Someji Kawamoto
- Dot to Dot: Will I Be Single Forever? (2026)

=== Television ===
- Three Outlaw Samurai (1968)
- Mito Kōmon (1971–2011)
- Ōoka Echizen (1971)
- Ronin of the Wilderness (1972)
- Hissatsu Shiokinin (1973), Danjōshōhitsu Hatakeyama
- Tasukenin Hashiru (1974), Takichi
- Edo no Kaze (1975–1976)
- Taiyō ni Hoero! (1975)
- A Woman and the Beancurd Soup (1976)
- Edo no Uzu (1978)
- Kinpachi-sensei (1988), Kazutomo Abe
- Moeyo Ken (1990), Serizawa Kamo
- Wataru Seken wa Oni Bakari (1990–2017), Ryō Noda
- Kōmyō ga Tsuji (2006)
- Smile (2009), Sosuke Machimura
- Nobunaga Concerto (2015), Village head
- Massan (2014–2015), Masashi Kameyama
- Naotora: The Lady Warlord (2017), Ii Naohira
