= Chieko Baisho =

Japanese actress and singer (born 1941)

- 倍賞 千恵子
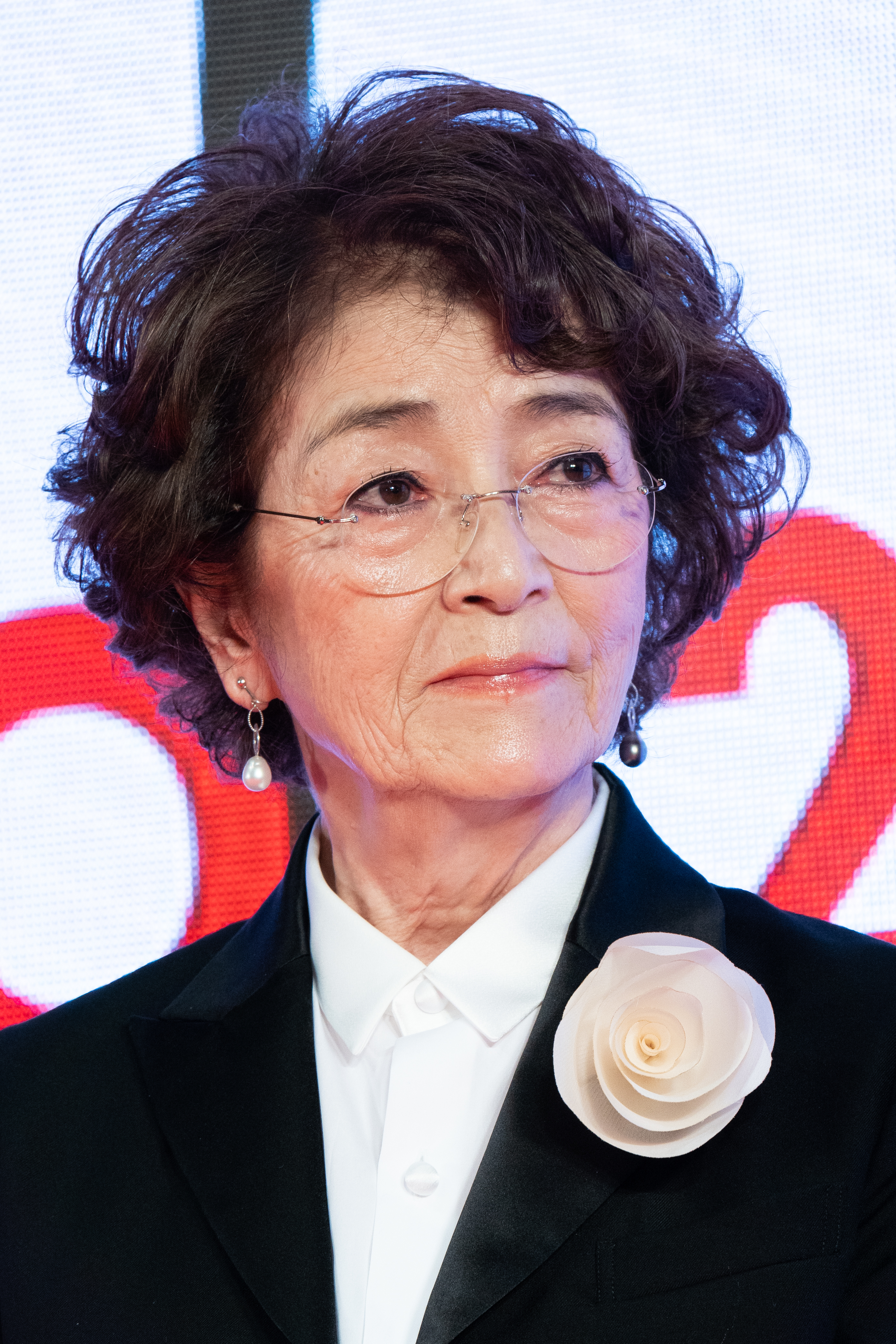
- Chieko Baisho at the Tokyo International Film Festival in 2019
- Born: June 29, 1941 (age 85); Kita, Tokyo, Japan
- Occupations: Actress, singer, voice actress
- Years active: 1961–present
- Spouse(s): Reijiro Koroku; Wikidata: Reijirō Koroku (Q4678162)
- Relatives: Mitsuko Baisho (sister); Naoto Inoki (great nephew)
- Website: baisho-chieko.com

Chieko Baisho (倍賞 千恵子, Baishō Chieko; born June 29, 1941) is a Japanese actress and singer.

In Japan, she is well known for her performance as Sakura in the Otoko wa Tsurai yo series from 1969 until 1995. In addition, she has acted in many films directed by Yōji Yamada since the 1960s. She won the award for Best Actress at the 5th Hochi Film Award for A Distant Cry from Spring.

== Career ==
=== Voice acting ===
She sometimes performs as a voice actress, such as "Sophie" in Howl's Moving Castle in 2004. Although different voice actresses usually played young and old Sophie in the foreign dubs of the film, Baisho performed both roles alone, as well as the film's theme song.

=== Singing career ===
She has had a career as a singer since her debut with the song "Shitamachi no Taiyō" in 1962, for which she won the "newcomer award" of the Japan Record Award. Her 1965 single, "Sayonara wa dance atoni", a cha-cha ballad, later had its melody inspire the 1992 song Moonlight Densetsu, the theme song of the first four seasons for the anime adaption of Sailor Moon. A cover by Mariko Takahashi would later appear in another Ghibli film, Only Yesterday.

She is also in the Kagurazaka Women's Choir, a choir consisting of celebrities performing for charity events.

== Personal life ==
She is the older sister of Mitsuko Baisho, who is also an actress.

She is married to the Japanese composer Reijiro Koroku.

== Selected filmography ==
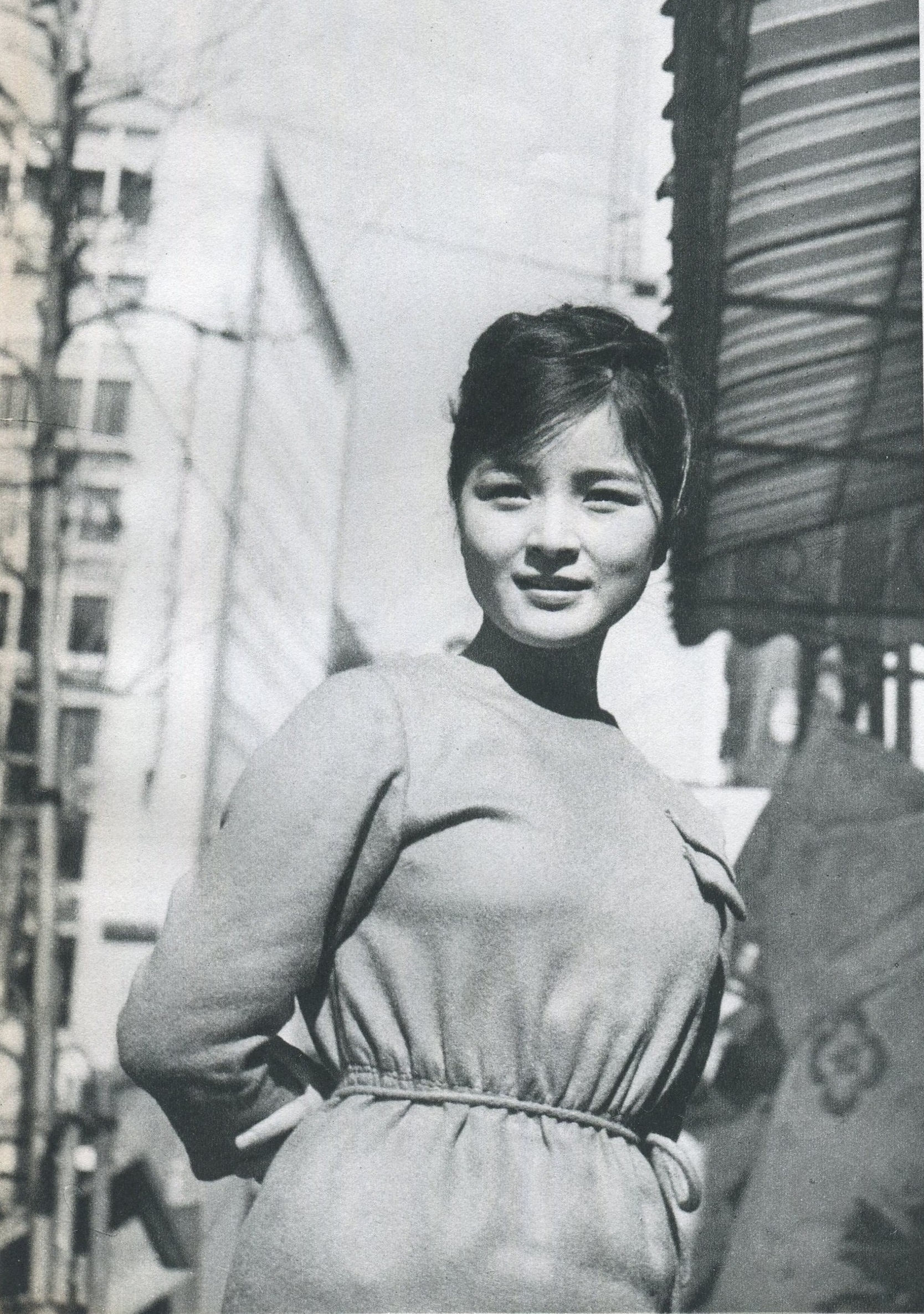
Chieko Baisho in 1962

Year	Film	Role	Notes	Ref
1965	Kiri no Hata			
1968	I, the Executioner	Haruko		
1969–2019	Otoko wa Tsurai yo series	Sakura Suwa		
1970	Where Spring Comes Late	Tamiko Kazami	Lead role	
1977	The Yellow Handkerchief	Mitsue Shima		
1980	A Distant Cry from Spring	Tamiko Kazami		
1981	Station	Kiriko Michio		
1981	Mobile Suit Gundam - Movie I	Kamaria Ray (voice)		
1981	Unico	West Wind (voice)		
1986	Final Take	Yuki		
1986	Lost in the Wilderness	Kimiko Uemura		
1988	Hope and Pain	Tamiko Shima		
1997	Jungle Emperor Leo	Lyre (voice)		
2004	Howl's Moving Castle	Sophie (voice)		
2004	The Hidden Blade	Mrs. Katagiri		
2008	Kabei: Our Mother	Adult Hatsuko		
2010	Zatoichi: The Last	Mitsu		
2013	Tokyo Newcomer	Kimie Igarashi		
2013	It All Began When I Met You	Kotoko Oshima		
2014	The Little House			
2019	Dad, Chibi is Gone	Yukiko Takei		
2019	Weathering with You	Fumi Tachibana (voice)		
2020	461 Days of Bento: A Promise Between Father and Son	Natsuko Suzumoto		
2021	Arc	elderly Rina		
2022	Plan 75	Michi	Lead role	
2025	Tokyo Taxi	Sumire Takano	Lead role	
2026	Till We Meet Again on the Starry Hill	Chiyo (old)		

== Honours ==
- Kinuyo Tanaka Award (2001)
- Medal with Purple Ribbon (2005)
- Order of the Rising Sun, 4th Class, Gold Rays with Rosette (2013)
