= 1975 in Japan =

- Decades: 1950s; 1960s; 1970s; 1980s; 1990s
- See also: Other events of 1975; History of Japan • Timeline • Years

Events from the year 1975 in Japan. It corresponds to Shōwa 50 (昭和50年) in the Japanese calendar.

== Incumbents ==
- Emperor: Hirohito
- Prime Minister: Takeo Miki (Liberal Democratic)
- Chief Cabinet Secretary: Ichitaro Ide
- Chief Justice of the Supreme Court: Tomokazu Murakami
- President of the House of Representatives: Shigesaburō Maeo
- President of the House of Councillors: Kenzō Kōno
- Diet sessions: 75th (regular session opened on December 27, 1974, to July 4), 76th (extraordinary, September 11 to December 25), 77th (regular, December 27 to May 24, 1976)

=== Governors ===
- Aichi Prefecture: Mikine Kuwahara (until 14 February); Yoshiaki Nakaya (starting 15 February)
- Akita Prefecture: Yūjirō Obata
- Aomori Prefecture: Shunkichi Takeuchi
- Chiba Prefecture: Taketo Tomonō (until 16 April); Kiichi Kawakami (starting 17 April)
- Ehime Prefecture: Haruki Shiraishi
- Fukui Prefecture: Heidayū Nakagawa
- Fukuoka Prefecture: Hikaru Kamei
- Fukushima Prefecture: Morie Kimura
- Gifu Prefecture: Saburō Hirano
- Gunma Prefecture: Konroku Kanda
- Hiroshima Prefecture: Hiroshi Miyazawa
- Hokkaido: Naohiro Dōgakinai
- Hyogo Prefecture: Tokitada Sakai
- Ibaraki Prefecture: Nirō Iwakami (until 22 April); Fujio Takeuchi (starting 23 April)
- Ishikawa Prefecture: Yōichi Nakanishi
- Iwate Prefecture: Tadashi Chida
- Kagawa Prefecture: Tadao Maekawa
- Kagoshima Prefecture: Saburō Kanemaru
- Kanagawa Prefecture: Bunwa Tsuda (until 22 April); Kazuji Nagasu (starting 23 April)
- Kochi Prefecture: Masumi Mizobuchi (until 6 December); Chikara Nakauchi (starting 7 December)
- Kumamoto Prefecture: Issei Sawada
- Kyoto Prefecture: Torazō Ninagawa
- Mie Prefecture: Ryōzō Tagawa
- Miyagi Prefecture: Sōichirō Yamamoto
- Miyazaki Prefecture: Hiroshi Kuroki
- Nagano Prefecture: Gon'ichirō Nishizawa
- Nagasaki Prefecture: Kan'ichi Kubo
- Nara Prefecture: Ryozo Okuda
- Niigata Prefecture: Takeo Kimi
- Oita Prefecture: Masaru Taki
- Okayama Prefecture: Shiro Nagano
- Okinawa Prefecture: Chōbyō Yara
- Osaka Prefecture: Ryōichi Kuroda
- Saga Prefecture: Sunao Ikeda
- Saitama Prefecture: Yawara Hata
- Shiga Prefecture: Masayoshi Takemura
- Shiname Prefecture: Seiji Tsunematsu
- Shizuoka Prefecture: Keizaburō Yamamoto
- Tochigi Prefecture: Yuzuru Funada
- Tokushima Prefecture: Yasunobu Takeichi
- Tokyo: Ryōkichi Minobe
- Tottori Prefecture: Kōzō Hirabayashi
- Toyama Prefecture: Kokichi Nakada
- Wakayama Prefecture: Masao Ohashi (until 4 October); Shirō Kariya (starting 23 November)
- Yamagata Prefecture: Seiichirō Itagaki
- Yamaguchi Prefecture: Masayuki Hashimoto
- Yamanashi Prefecture: Kunio Tanabe

== Events ==
- January 1 – A hotel bus plunges into Lake Aoki in Nagano Prefecture, killing 24.
- March 10 – Sanyo Shinkansen officially open between Okayama Station to Hakata Station of Fukuoka.
- July 20 – opening of Expo '75 in Okinawa.
- August 6 – According to Japanese government official confirmed report, a heavy massive rain, following debris flow hit in Mount Iwaki in Nakatsugaru District (present day of Hirosaki), Aomori Prefecture, kill 21 persons with injure 31 persons.
- August 17–18 – Typhoon Phyllis, where hit on landslide, debris flow, flood swept hit in Kochi Prefecture, Shikoku Island, killing 77 persons and 209 persons injures, according to Japan Fire and Disaster Management official confirmed report.
- November 2–8 – 1975 Japan Open Tennis Championships held in Tokyo.
- November 3 – Miss International 1975 held at Expo Portside Theater, Motobu, Okinawa.
- November 26 to December 3 – Japanese National Railways mandatory implementation an eight-day-long illegal "strike for the right to strike".
- December 12 – In Osaka International Airport of Itami, where takeoff and landing of civilian aircraft before 7 o'clock and after 21 o'clock was forbidden, that caused by noise complaints from residents triggered.
- December 31 – 17th Japan Record Awards held in Tokyo.

== Films ==
- Banned Book: Flesh Futon
- Cruelty: Black Rose Torture
- Dersu Uzala, directed by Akira Kurosawa
- Graveyard of Honor, directed by Kinji Fukasaku
- Hans Christian Andersen's The Little Mermaid, directed by Tomoharu Katsumata
- Kamen Rider Amazon
- Kamen Rider Stronger
- Karayuki-san, the Making of a Prostitute, directed by Shohei Imamura
- Oryu's Passion: Bondage Skin
- The Return of the Sister Street Fighter, directed by Kazuhiko Yamaguchi
- Terror of Mechagodzilla, directed by Ishirō Honda
- Tokyo Emmanuelle
- Tora-san's Rise and Fall, directed by Yoji Yamada
- Tora-san, the Intellectual, directed by Yoji Yamada
- A Woman Called Sada Abe, directed by Noboru Tanaka

== Births ==
- January 1 – Eiichiro Oda, illustrator and author (One Piece)
- January 6 – Yukana, voice actress and singer
- January 8 – Reiko Chiba, actress
- January 28 – Hiroshi Kamiya, voice actor
- January 30 – Yumi Yoshimura, singer (Puffy Amiyumi)
- February 6 – Tomoko Kawase, singer
- February 10 – Hiroki Kuroda, baseball pitcher
- February 16 – Nanase Aikawa, singer
- February 17 – Michiko Kichise, actress
- February 25 – Chiemi Chiba, voice actress
- April 3
  - Koji Uehara, baseball pitcher
  - Yoshinobu Takahashi, professional baseball player
- April 14 – Takayoshi Tanimoto, singer
- April 16 – Megumi Ōhara, voice actress
- April 27 – Kazuyoshi Funaki, ski jumper
- May 19 – Mitsutoshi Shimabukuro, manga artist (Seikimatsu Leader den Takeshi!, Toriko)
- May 26 – Tsuruno Takeshi, actor and singer
- June 22 – Yuka Itaya, actress
- July 5 – Ai Sugiyama, tennis player
- July 11 – Riona Hazuki, actress
- July 22 – Kenshin Kawakami, baseball pitcher
- August 1 – Ryoko Yonekura, actress
- August 11 – Kishō Taniyama, voice actor
- August 24 – Hayato Sakurai, martial artist
- August 28 – Yūko Gotō, voice actress
- September 6 – Ryoko Tani, judoka
- November 11 – Daisuke Ohata, rugby union player
- November 15 – Hiromi Ominami, long-distance runner
- November 16 – Yuki Uchida, actress
- December 12 – Kuwashima Houko, voice actress
- December 15 – Haruna Ikezawa, actress and voice actress
- December 16 – Masaki Sumitani, television performer
- December 30 – Yoma Komatsu, singer

== Deaths ==
- January 16 – Bandō Mitsugorō VIII, kabuki actor (b. 1906)
- February 11 – Hideo Shinojima, footballer (b. 1910)
- May 30 – Tatsuo Shimabuku, martial artist and founder of Isshin-ryu karate (b. 1908)
- June 3 – Eisaku Satō, Prime Minister of Japan, recipient of the Nobel Peace Prize (b. 1901)
- November 19 – Tokushichi Mishima, inventor and engineer (b. 1893)
- December 15 – Shigeyoshi Inoue, admiral (b. 1889)

== See also ==
- 1975 in Japanese television
- List of Japanese films of 1975
- 1975 in Japanese music
