= List of Japanese films of 1975 =

A list of films released in Japan in 1975 (see 1975 in film).

Title	Director	Cast	Genre	Notes
1975
Banned Book: Flesh Futon	Nobuaki Shirai	Hajime Tanimoto; Terumi Azuma	Roman porno	
Cops vs. Thugs	Kinji Fukasaku	Bunta Sugawara	Yakuza	Won two Blue Ribbon Awards in 1976: Best Director (Fukasaku) and Best Actor (Sugawara)
Cruelty: Black Rose Torture	Katsuhiko Fujii	Naomi Tani; Terumi Azuma	Roman porno	Tani & Azuma's second teaming First use of the "Black Rose" nickname for Tani
Dersu Uzala	Akira Kurosawa	Maxim Munzuk, Yury Solomin	Drama	A Soviet-Japanese coproduction that won the 1975 Oscar for Best Foreign Language Film in addition to the Golden Prize at the 9th Moscow International Film Festival
Gorenger the Movie			mocatsu	Movie version of Gorenger episode 6
Gorenger: The Blue Fortress			Tokusatsu	Movie version of Gorenger episode 15
Graveyard of Honor	Kinji Fukasaku	Tetsuya Watari	Yakuza	Won the 1976 Blue Ribbon Award for Best Director
Hans Christian Andersen's The Little Mermaid	Tomoharu Katsumata		Anime	Adaptation of Hans Christian Andersen's The Little Mermaid
Kamen Rider Amazon		Toru Okazaki	Tokusatsu	Movie version of Kamen Rider Amazon episode 16.
Kamen Rider Stronger		Shigeru Araki	Tokusatsu	Movie version of Kamen Rider Stronger episode 7.
Karayuki-san, the Making of a Prostitute	Shohei Imamura		Documentary	
Newlywed Hell	Akira Katō	Naomi Tani; Terumi Azuma	Roman porno	
Oryu's Passion: Bondage Skin	Katsuhiko Fujii	Naomi Tani; Terumi Azuma	Roman porno	
The Bullet Train	Junya Satō			
The Return of the Sister Street Fighter	Kazuhiko Yamaguchi	Etsuko Shihomi	Martial Arts	
The Shiranui Sea	Noriaki Tsuchimoto		Documentary	
Terror of Mechagodzilla	Ishirō Honda		Kaiju	Last Showa era Godzilla film The last full film that Honda would direct
Tokyo Emmanuelle	Akira Katō	Kumi Taguchi	Roman porno	
Tora-san's Rise and Fall	Yoji Yamada	Kiyoshi Atsumi	Comedy	15th in the Otoko wa Tsurai yo series
Tora-san, the Intellectual	Yoji Yamada	Kiyoshi Atsumi	Comedy	16th in the Otoko wa Tsurai yo series
Two in the Amsterdam Rain	Koreyoshi Kurahara	Kenichi Hagiwara	Romantic drama, Spy thriller	
A Woman Called Sada Abe	Noboru Tanaka	Junko Miyashita	Roman porno	

== See also ==
- 1975 in Japan
- 1975 in Japanese television
