= Mitsuyasu =

- Gender: Male

Origin
- Origin: Japanese
- Meaning: Different meanings depending on the kanji used

Mitsuyasu (written: 光泰 or 光保) is a masculine Japanese given name. Notable people with the name include:

- Katō Mitsuyasu (加藤 光泰; 1537–1593), Japanese samurai and daimyō
- Mitsuyasu Maeno (前野 光保; c. 1947 – 1976), Japanese actor
