= Deep Throat in Tokyo =

- Theatrical poster for the Spanish-language release of Deep Throat in Tokyo (1975)
- Directed by: Kan Mukai
- Written by: Tatsuhiko Kamoi; Yutaka Kohira
- Starring: Kumi Taguchi
- Cinematography: Shizuo Hanazawa
- Edited by: Osamu Tanaka
- Music by: Toshiaki Tsushima
- Distributed by: Toei
- Release date: December 6, 1975
- Running time: 77 minutes
- Country: Japan
- Language: Japanese

Deep Throat in Tokyo (東京ディープスロート夫人, Tōkyō Diipu Surōto Fujin) is a 1975 Japanese pink film directed by Kan Mukai. It has a reputation as being the prolific director's "most notorious feature" and best known film.

== Synopsis ==
Kumi Taguchi is a model who leaves her boxer boyfriend after he sustains an injury. She meets and quickly marries Hideo, the heir to a corporate empire. Hideo's father, Takehiko, lusts after Kumi. Takehiko sends his son away, ostensibly on a business trip, but actually so that he can be murdered by Takehiko's henchmen. Takehiko seduces Kumi, but is frustrated when she refuses to perform oral sex on him. Angered, Takehiko forces Kumi to undergo surgery in which her clitoris is transferred to her throat, thereby requiring that she engage in oral sex in order to have an orgasm. Hideo, the supposedly murdered son, returns having paid off his assassins. Hideo shoots and kills his father, but Kumi grabs the gun and kills Hideo so that she can inherit the family's fortune.

== Cast ==
- Kumi Taguchi as Kumi Sakuma
- Hideo Murota (室田日出男) Takehiko Sakuma
- Tatsuya Nanjō (南城竜也) Hideo Sakuma
- Tetsuya Chiba (千葉哲也) as Ken'ichi Hirota
- Akiko Mori (森秋子) as Shinobu Miura
- Yūko Akane (茜ゆう子) as Mayumi
- Fumio Watanabe (渡辺文雄) as Kawata

== Critical appraisal ==
Deep Throat in Tokyo was part of a fad during the mid-1970s of taking foreign sex films as inspiration for domestic releases. Nikkatsu's Tokyo Emmanuelle (1975) and Lady Chatterley In Tokyo (1977) were part of this trend, the former film starring Deep Throat in Tokyo's Kumi Taguchi.

In his Behind the Pink Curtain: The Complete History of Japanese Sex Cinema (1998), Jasper Sharp compares Deep Throat in Tokyo to its US inspiration, Deep Throat (1972). According to Sharp, Mukai's film has much better production values, taking an "airbrushed fantasy" approach more similar to the French Emmanuelle (1974) than the "crude and direct" US film. Nevertheless, Mukai's film presents a reactionary attitude towards sex in direct opposition to the liberated approach attempted in the US film. While the US film portrayed sex as something to be enjoyed by both men and women, in Mukai's film, it is for the man to enjoy at the woman's expense. In contrast to the humorous approach taken by the US film, Mukai's plays its subject seriously, which, Sharp notes, enables it to be enjoyed in a camp manner. As an example of this aspect of the film, Sharp singles out a scene soon after Kumi's operation, in which she first experiences post-surgery orgasm by shoving a banana down her throat. Red wine flows down Kumi's throat signifying the loss of her "virginity", as the orchestral soundtrack swells for dramatic emphasis.

== Bibliography ==
=== English ===
- Tôkyô dîpu surôto fujin (1975) at IMDb
- "DEEP THROAT IN TOKYO". Complete Index to World Film.
- Sharp, Jasper (2008). Behind the Pink Curtain: The Complete History of Japanese Sex Cinema. Guildford: FAB Press. pp. 184–185, 351. ISBN 978-1-903254-54-7.
- Weisser, Thomas; Yuko Mihara Weisser (1998). Japanese Cinema Encyclopedia: The Sex Films. Miami: Vital Books : Asian Cult Cinema Publications. ISBN 1-889288-52-7.

=== Japanese ===
- 東京ディープスロート夫人(1975) (in Japanese). allcinema.net.
- 東京ディープスロート夫人 (in Japanese). Japanese Movie Database.
- "東京ディープスロート夫人". Japanese Cinema Database (Agency for Cultural Affairs). Archived from the original on October 8, 2011.
- 東京ディープスロート夫人(邦画 ) (in Japanese). Kinema Junpo. Archived from the original on 2012-03-24.
