= Noriko Tatsumi =

Japanese actress

- Born: October 12, 1947 (age 78); Japan

Noriko Tatsumi (辰巳典子, Tatsumi Noriko; born October 12, 1947 in Osaka, Japan) is a Japanese actress known primarily for her appearances in pink films of the 1960s. During the "First Wave" of pink film, Tatsumi became known as the first "Queen" of Japanese softcore sex movies, a title which she held from 1967 through 1970. She most often appeared in the films of the World Eiga and Nihon Cinema studios, and is best known for her work with director Kōji Seki, especially Whore (1967) and Erotic Culture Shock (1969). She also appeared in director and Seijun Suzuki script-writer, Atsushi Yamatoya's influential 1967 cult film, Inflatable Sex Doll of the Wastelands.

== Life and career ==
=== 1967 ===
Tatsumi made her pink film debut in 1967. There is some discrepancy as to which film was her debut. Some sources say that Tatsumi's first film was Double Docking a.k.a. Two Virgins, while others claim that her debut was in Muddy Uniform. Director Shintaro Kishi is usually credited with launching Tatsumi's career, by giving her a starring role in his Double Docking. Tatsumi's role is that of a woman who starts working in a nightclub in order to discover the mystery behind her sister's disappearance. In the process, she finds an illicit prostitution ring. Muddy Uniform, intended as a juvenile delinquent film, became a pink film by default because of its abundant sex scenes. In another early film, Clutches (1967), Tatsumi plays a gold-digger who takes over a businessman's enterprise.

Nihon Cinema's Whore (1967) teamed Tatsumi with actress Miki Hayashi and director Kōji Seki. The film was a suspense thriller with Tatsumi as a woman plotting her husband's death to collect a large inheritance. Tatsumi would continue to work with Hayashi and Seki throughout the 1960s.

In director Toshio Okuwaki's Climax (1967), Tatsumi plays the role of a woman engaged to a rich man. Her overly protective brother, a poor college student, is against the marriage, but agrees to cause no problems in exchange for a loan from his sister's fiancée. When he later comes to the conclusion that he has betrayed his values, he murders his sister. The Weissers, in their Japanese Cinema Encyclopedia: The Sex Films, judge the film better than Okuwaki's more typical, later work, and conclude, "It's not great filmmaking, but at least this movie manages to be unique within its grim view of life."

Suzuki screenwriter Atsushi Yamatoya's directorial debut, Inflatable Sex Doll of the Wastelands (1967) is a hallucinogenic film-noir-style satire which became "one of the major cult films of the '60s". The plot involves a rich businessman whose girlfriend is raped and killed by four men. When the men send the businessman a film of the crime, he complains about the film's poor cinematography. While practising shooting targets in the desert, the businessman hires a private detective to track down the criminals. The private investigator discovers the woman is not really dead, becomes involved in a sexual liaison with her, and then she is again "killed" by the four criminals. The private investigator comes across a shack in the middle of a desert filled with mannequins modeled after the girl. After a mysterious gunshot, the film circles back to the target-practise scene where the businessman is hiring the private eye. During the filming of this cult film, Tatsumi and lead actor Shohei Yamamoto simultaneously appeared in Love's Milky Drops using the same sets as Inflatable Sex Doll of the Wastelands.

The pink films of this era had very low budgets and were made by independent studios. Pink film directors from the critically respected Kōji Wakamatsu to the critically reviled Giichi Nishihara generally focused on sensationalistic, violent, and often misogynistic themes. Tatsumi, however, became associated with the higher-class productions within the genre. Lynch and Rope (1967) was an unusual project for Tatsumi in this regard, because she normally avoided this type of violent, S&M genre film. She lent her voice to the film as narrator, and it is assumed that she participated in the project as a favor to the film's director, the man who helped start her career, Shintaro Kishi.

Tatsumi was paired—almost—with future Nikkatsu Roman Porno queen, Naomi Tani in Memoirs Of A Modern Female Doctor (1967). The film was in two separate sections, and Tatsumi and Tani appeared in different stories. Tatsumi's story had her as a sexually promiscuous office lady who sleeps with her boss and co-workers, eventually becoming pregnant. Director Mamoru Watanabe's Slave Widow (1967) had three major pink film stars together—Noriko Tatsumi, Mari Iwai and Naomi Tani. One of the better films of the First Wave of pink film, Tatsumi's acting ability was singled out for praise in this film which helped her to attain the status of Queen of the Pink film. Along with Genji Nakamura and Banmei Takahashi, director Mamoru Watanabe is considered one of the three "Pillars of Pink" of the Wave of Pink film.

=== 1968 ===
Though Nikkatsu's wouldn't officially enter the pink film genre until the inception of their Roman Porno series in November, 1971, they did experiment with the form in 1968. In Tokyo Bathhouse, Tatsumi was at the top of the cast of over 30 sex-film stars of the era in cameo appearances. According to Japanese Cinema Encyclopedia: The Sex Films, "There has never been - and never again will be - such a smorgasbord of major sex stars populating one movie." Tatsumi given top billing among them was listed as the star. Several of the pink film stars stayed on for Ukiyo-e Women (1968), Nikkatsu's sister-film to their first pink project. Of the all sex-film star cast, Japanese Cinema Encyclopedia: The Sex Films reports, "The stand-out among all the succulent beauties is Noriko Tatsumi who plays an extremely passionate nun."

Controversial early pink film director Tetsuji Takechi chose Tatsumi as the female lead in his Ukiyo-E Cruel Story (1968). Made after Takechi's imprisonment and high-profile trial over his 1965 film Black Snow, Ukiyo-e Cruel Story was intended as a direct message to Eirin, the Japanese film-rating board. Made after Takechi had won the trial, the film is about a painter of erotic pictures who is persecuted by the government. Though still containing significant erotic content, this is one of Takechi's few films to pass the censor relatively un-edited, perhaps because Eirin feared losing another embarrassing public confrontation with the outspoken director.

=== 1969 ===
Erotic Culture Shock: Swapping Partners (1969) concerns a woman whose husband is eager to experiment with wife-swapping. She refuses until she discovers that her father is involved in a similar activity. Packed-Full With Women (1969) was a sex-comedy which gave Tatsumi little to do but take off her clothes.

== Partial filmography ==
Title	Director	Company	Release date
Double Docking / Two Virgins ダブル処女	Shintaro Kishi	Yamabe Productions/Kanto Eihai	29 January 1967
Memoirs Of A Modern Female Doctor 現代女性医学; Gendai Joi Igaku	Kinya Ogawa	Okura Eiga	1 May 1967
Slave Widow 奴隷未亡人; Dorei Mibōjin	Mamoru Watanabe	Mutsukuni Eiga	11 July 1967
Taste Of Women 女の味; Onna no aji	Kōji Seki	Nihon Cinema	July 1967
Clutches 毒牙; Dokuga	Osamu Yamashita	Kanto Eihai	12 September 1967
Inflatable Sex Doll of the Wastelands 荒野のダッチワイフ; Kōya no Dutch Wife	Atsushi Yamatoya	Kokuei	3 October 1967
Whore 売女（ばいた） Baita	Kōji Seki	Nihon Cinema	17 October 1967
Ten Years Of Evil 悪道庵十年; Akudama Junen	Mamoru Watanabe	Kiei	October 1967
Lynch and Rope リンチと縛り; Lynch to shibari	Shintaro Kishi	Yamabe Productions/Nihon Cinema	7 November 1967
Love's Milky Drops 多情な乳液; Tajo Na Nyueki	Ario Takeda	Yamabe Productions/Okura Eiga	1 December 1967
Muddy Uniform 泥だらけの制服; Dorodarake no seifuku	Takae Shindo	Kanto Movie	1967
Climax	Toshio Okuwaki	World Eiga	1967
Hot Crime 熱い犯行; Atsui Hanko	Moto Sasaki	Nihon Cinema	June 1968
Tokyo Bathhouse 女浮世風呂; Onna Ukiyo Buro	Motomu Ida	Aoyama Productions/Nikkatsu	10 July 1968
女のうれし泣き; Onna no ureshinaki	Ario Takeda	六邦映画	August 1968
Ukiyo-e Cruel Story 浮世絵残酷物語; Ukiyoe Zankoku Monogatari	Tetsuji Takechi	Takechi Productions / Daiei	7 September 1968
Red Pleasure 赤い快楽; Akai Kairaku	Moto Sasaki	Nihon Cinema	September 1968
Ukiyo-E Women 秘帳 女浮世草紙; Onna Ukiyozoshi	Motomu Ida	Aoyama Productions/Nikkatsu	19 October 1968
Hungry For Lust 飢えた獣欲; Ueta Joyoku	Kaoru Umezawa	Nihon Cinema / Shishi	November 1968
Erotic Culture Shock: Swapping Partners; Erotic Fuudoki-kaedoko	Kōji Seki	Shin Nihon	1969
Packed-Full With Women; Onna No Takobeya	Akio Takeda	Nihon Cinema	1969
Way Of Lust; Shikiyoku No Hate	Akio Takeda	Nihon Cinema	1969

== Sources ==
- Noriko Tatsumi at IMDb
- "NORIKO TATSUMI". The Complete Index to World Film.
- "達巳典子 (Tatsumi Noriko)" (in Japanese). Japanese Movie Database.
- Weisser, Thomas; Yuko Mihara Weisser (1998). Japanese Cinema Encyclopedia: The Sex Films. Miami: Vital Books : Asian Cult Cinema Publications. ISBN 1-889288-52-7.
