= Blue Film: Estimation =

- Theatrical poster
- Directed by: Kan Mukai
- Written by: Atsushi Yamatoya
- Starring: Mari Nagisa; Kemi Ichiboshi; Norihiro Ōtani
- Cinematography: Shirō Suzuki
- Distributed by: Mukai Productions; Nihon Geijutsu Kyokai; Wakamatsu Productions; Kantō Movies
- Release date: March 1968
- Running time: 69 minutes
- Country: Japan
- Language: Japanese

Blue Film: Estimation (Japanese: 蒼いフィルム 品さだめ, Hepburn: Aoi firumu shinasadame) is a 1968 Japanese pink film directed by Kan Mukai. It is in the Part color-format which was common with Pink films in the late 1960s and early 1970s before Nikkatsu's entry into the genre with their Roman Porno films.

== Synopsis ==
The film depicts the plight of a female office worker whose boss introduces her to the world of pornographic films.

== Cast ==
- Mari Nagisa as Maya (typist)
- Kemi Ichiboshi
- Norihiro Ōtani as Kunio
- Mitsugu Fujii
- Risa Minakami

== Production ==
Director Kan Mukai often capitalized on controversy to boost the publicity surrounding the release of his films. In the case of Blue Film: Estimation, the advertising campaign emphasizing the appearance of mainstream actress Mitsugu Fujii in this pink film created enough public notice to make the film a success. Fujii would again work with Mukai in his Blue Film Woman (1969).

== Bibliography ==
=== English ===
- Aoi firumu: Shinasadame (1968) at IMDb
- "AOI FILM SHINASADAME". Complete Index to World Film.
- Weisser, Thomas; Yuko Mihara Weisser (1998). Japanese Cinema Encyclopedia: The Sex Films. Miami: Vital Books : Asian Cult Cinema Publications. p. 70. ISBN 1-889288-52-7.

=== Japanese ===
- 蒼いフィルム 品さだめ (in Japanese). Japanese Movie Database.
- "蒼いフィルム 品さだめ". Japanese Cinema Database (Agency for Cultural Affairs). Archived from the original on 2012-03-11.
