= Sexy Partners =

- Theatrical poster for Sexy Partners (1967)
- Directed by: Kan Mukai
- Written by: Yutaka Sō; Kan Mukai
- Produced by: Minoru Edogawa
- Starring: Michiko Sakyō; Jōji Ohara
- Cinematography: Ryuji Takano
- Edited by: Osamu Nakayama
- Music by: Takashi Akutagawa
- Production company: Mutsukuni Eiga
- Release date: July 2, 1967 (Japan)
- Running time: 70 minutes
- Country: Japan
- Language: Japanese

Sexy Partners (Japanese: いろの道づれ, Hepburn: Iro no Michizure) a.k.a. Companions of Love and Lustful Companions is a 1967 Japanese pink film directed by Kan Mukai. It was the first pink film to use S&M as a main theme.

== Synopsis ==
Tomoko suffers at the hand of her husband, Arakawa, who practises sadistic sex with her and various other women. After Arakawa dies suddenly, Tomoko is at first relieved, but then discovers that she is incapable of enjoying sex unless she is in a masochistic position.

== Cast ==
- Michiko Sakyō as Tomoko
- Jōji Ohara as Arakawa
- Kae Hoshi as Masayo, a maid
- Kemi Ichiboshi as bar hostess
- Midori Enoki as bar hostess

== Background and critical appraisal ==
Kan Mukai filmed Sexy Partners for Mutsukuni Eiga and this studio released it theatrically in Japan on July 2, 1967. There is some disagreement among Japanese sources as to which was the first pink film to deal with sado-masochism. Besides Sexy Partners, some claim the first pink S&M was in Masao Adachi's Birth Control Revolution, Hitoshi Kataoka's Trap Of Lust, or Kinya Ogawa's Memoirs Of A Modern Female Doctor. All these films were released in 1967. Whichever was the first to introduce S&M into pink cinema, Sexy Partners was the first pink film to use it as its central theme.

In their Japanese Cinema Encyclopedia: The Sex Films, Thomas and Yuko Mihara Weisser give Sexy Partners a rating of two-and-a-half out of four stars, noting that whether one considers it a good or a bad film largely depends on one's attitude towards cinematic S&M. They judge Mukai's story and script to be "limited, psychologically deficient", "clandestinely misogynist", "wildly contrived, simplistic and even antagonistic", merely providing a pretext for scenes of whipping and other forms of abuse. In the film's favor, however, the Weissers note that the performances are above average, and that the character of Tomoko, the wife, is sympathetic. Mukai's direction and camera-work are also praised as markedly better than that in other pink films of this era.

== Bibliography ==
- Iro no michizure (1967) at IMDb
- "IRO NO MICHIZURE". Complete Index to World Film.
- Weisser, Thomas; Yuko Mihara Weisser (1998). Japanese Cinema Encyclopedia: The Sex Films. Miami: Vital Books : Asian Cult Cinema Publications. pp. 257–258. ISBN 1-889288-52-7.
- いろの道づれ (in Japanese). Japanese Movie Database.
- いろの道づれ (in Japanese). Japanese Cinema Database (Agency for Cultural Affairs).

== Notes ==
[[Category:1960s Japanese-lwwewanguage fiww lms]]
