= Fumie Kashiyama =

Japanese actress (born 1941)

- 樫山 文枝
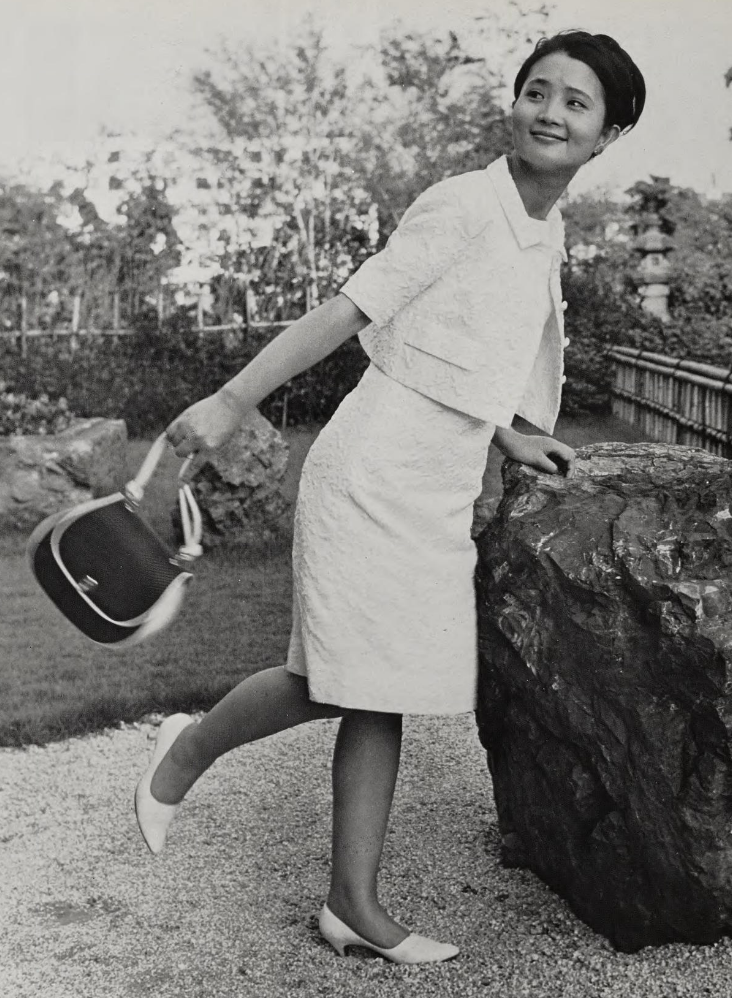
- Born: August 13, 1941 (age 84); Tokyo, Japan
- Occupation: Actress
- Years active: 1960 - present
- Spouse: Masahiko Watahiki

Fumie Kashiyama (樫山 文枝, Kashiyama Fumie; born August 13, 1941) is a Japanese actress who is a member of the Mingei Theatre Company.

In 1966, she played the protagonist in the NHK morning drama (Asadora) series Ohanahan. She has also performed in other television dramas and comedy films such as the role of Reiko in Tora-san, the Intellectual. Kashiyama is married to the actor Masahiko Watahiki.

== Anime dubbing roles ==
- Hans Christian Andersen's The Little Mermaid (1975) – Marina
- Anne no Nikki (Special) (1979) – Narrator
- Anne no Nikki (Movie) (1995) – Edith Frank-Holländer

== Television and film roles ==
- Ohanahan (1966) – Asao
- Chikadō no Taiyō Made (1968) – Yuki
- Koto no Taiyo (1968) – Hatsuko Araki
- Kunitori Monogatari (1973) – Yamauchi Chiyo
- Tora-san, the Intellectual (Part of the series Otoko wa Tsurai yo) (1975) – Reiko
- Kodomo no Koro Senso ga Atta (1981) – Kazue Hasuike
- Furusato (1983) – Hana
- Dauntaun Hirozu (1988) – Kimiko Masaoka
- San-nen B-gumi Kinpachi Sensei 3 (1988)
- Tabi no Okurimono 0:00 Hatsu (2006)
- Tsuru Akira: Kokoro no Kiseki (2009)
- Mio on the Shore (2019)

== Stage acting roles ==
- The Seagull (by Anton Chekov)
