= Mariko Miyagi =

Japanese actress (1927–2020)

- 宮城まり子
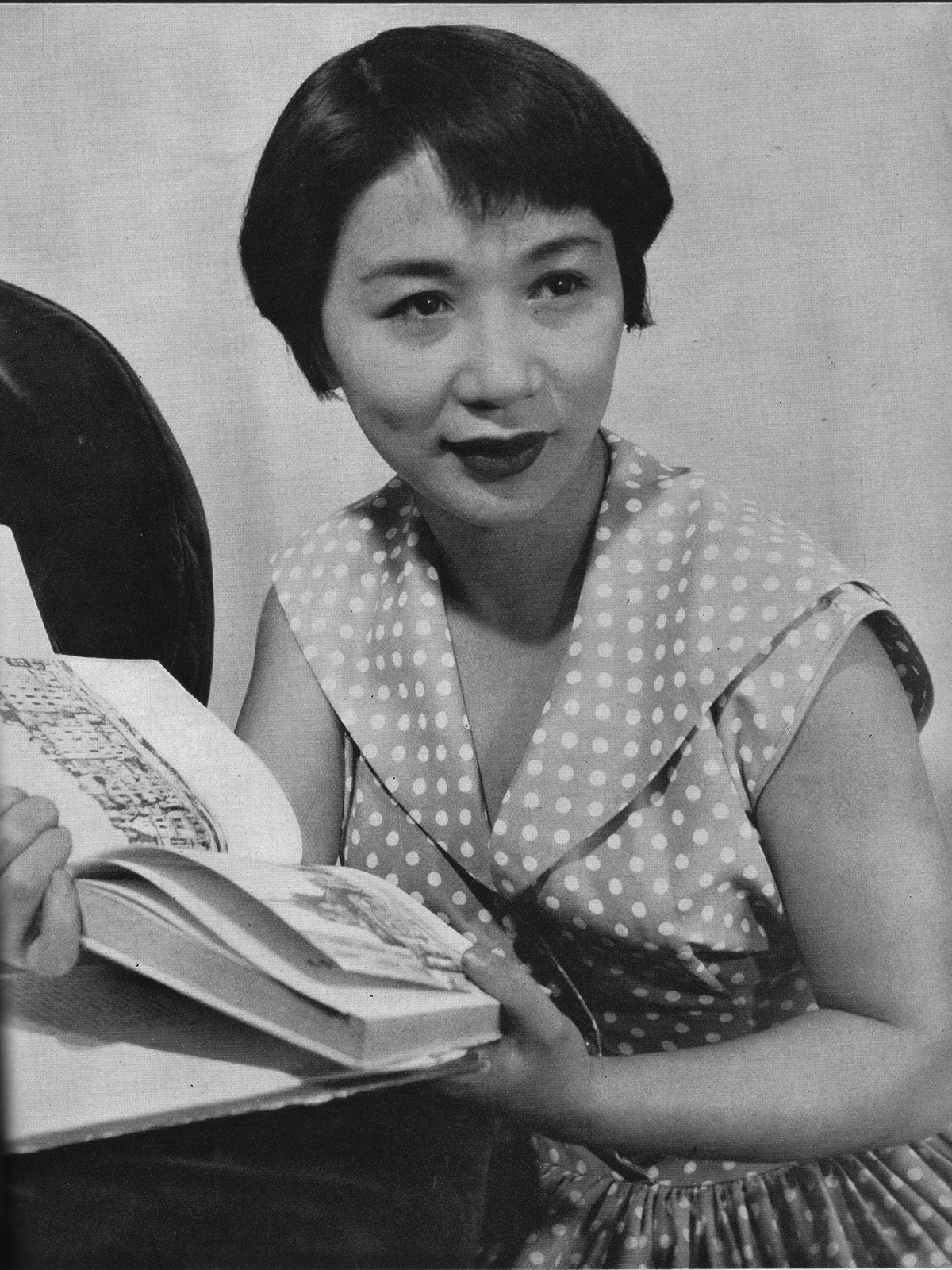
- Born: Mariko Honme; March 21, 1927; Tokyo, Japan
- Died: March 21, 2020 (aged 93)
- Occupations: Actress and singer

Mariko Miyagi (宮城 まり子) (March 21, 1927 – March 21, 2020) was a Japanese actress, singer, and advocate for children with disabilities. She founded the Kusunoki Gakuen, a school for disabled children.

== Early life ==
Miyagi was born Mariko Honme in Tokyo, Japan. She was the older of two siblings. Her family moved to Osaka when she was in the third grade because of her father's work. When she graduated from elementary school the family underwent a series of misfortunes, including her mother's death. Miyagi and her brother entered the Yoshimoto Kogyo production company and became singers.

== Career ==
Miyagi's first stage appearance was in October 1944. After the end of World War II in Asia, she continued performing at several theaters before releasing her first record in 1950 with Teichiku Records. Her first hit was "Anta Honto ni Sugoi wa ne", which was released by Victor Records. She continued releasing hits like "Gado-shita no Kutsumigaki" throughout the fifties, and appeared on the Kohaku Uta Gassen several times.

While preparing for a role in which she would play a child with cerebral palsy, Miyagi visited a facility for disabled children. Inspired by this, Miyagi started the Nemunoki Gakuen, a school for children with disabilities, in Omaezaki, Shizuoka in 1968. It was the first school of its kind, built when education for disabled children wasn't yet mandatory. The school's curriculum especially focused on music and the arts. It later moved to Kakegawa, Shizuoka. Miyagi directed and produced a documentary about the school called "Nemunoki no Uta".

In 2012 Miyagi was awarded the Order of the Sacred Treasure.

Miyagi died on March 21, 2020, of lymphoma.

== Films ==
Year	Title	Role	Notes
1956	Kuronekokan ni Kieta Otoko	Reiko Suzumura	
1956	Daigaku no kengo keiraku no abarenbo		
1956	Gojugô mênme no uwaki		
1956	Tenten musume dainibu: Tenten musume ni hana ga saku		
1956	Tenten musume daiichibu: Tenten musume ki wa nihon hare		
1957	Gokurakuto monogatari		
1958	Onboro jinsei	Mariko	
1958	Tôkyô no kyûjitsu	Singer	
1958	Yajikata dôchû sugoroku	Omari	
1958	Panda and the Magic Serpent		Voice
1959	Gurama-to no yuwaku	Ai	
1961	Ten Dark Women	Miwako	
1962	Kigeki: Detatoko shôbu - 'Chinjarara monogatari' yori	Chôko	
1964	Zoku Haikei Tenno Heika Sama	Keiko	
1964	Haikei sôri daijin sama		
1975	Hans Christian Andersen's The Little Mermaid	Fritz	Voice
1975	Children Drawing Rainbows		Director
1977	Barefoot Gen: Explosion of Tears	Kimie Nakaoka	
1978	Oyayubihime	Bunbu	Voice, (final film role)
