= Taro Shigaki =

Japanese actor and voice actor (1951–2022)

Taro Shigaki (志垣 太郎, Shigaki Tarō; born Minoru Kawamura (河村 稔, Kawamura Minori), September 22, 1951 – March 5, 2022) was a Japanese actor and voice actor. He was married to Noriko Shirasaka and they had one child, Takumi Kazune.

== Filmography ==
=== Acting roles ===
- Akantare (xxxx) - Hidetaro
- Samurai! (xxxx) - Lieutenant Commander Sasai
- Shin Heike Monogatari (1972) - Minamoto no Yoshitsune
- Kashin (1977) - Kusaka Genzui
- Black Pean (2018) - Nobuaki Moriya

=== Voice roles ===
- André Grandier in The Rose of Versailles (xxxx)
- Franz, Fritz in Nutcracker Fantasy (xxxx)
- Saki Vashtal in Area 88 (OAV, xxxx)
- Soldier Blue in Toward the Terra (Movie, xxxx)
- Prince in Hans Christian Andersen's The Little Mermaid (1975)
- Siegfried in Swan Lake (1981)

== Awards ==
Year	Award	Category	Work(s)	Result	Ref.
1973	Elan d'or Awards	Newcomer of the Year	Himself	Won	
