= Golden Half =

Japanese pop band

- Genres: Pop music
- Years active: 1970-1974
- Members: Maria Mori; Luna Takamura; Eri Ishiyama; Yumi Kobayashi; Eva Marie Vasquez

Golden Half (ゴールデンハーフ, Gōruden Hāfu) was an early 1970s J-pop band made up of 5 hāfu members, including Maria Mori, Eva Marie Vasquez and Luna Takamura. All of the members were of mixed Japanese and Caucasian descent.

Golden Half was promoted by Watanabe Productions and was composed in September 1970 to sing and go-go dance on the Fuji TV show BEAT POP. They often sang western pop songs in Japanese and split in 1974. The band appeared in the nightclub scenes in Yasuharu Hasebe's Stray Cat Rock: Sex Hunter where they performed their hit song Kiiroi Sakuranbo ("Yellow Cherry").
