= Modern Female Ninja: Flesh Hell =

- Theatrical poster for Modern Female Ninja: Flesh Hell (1968)
- Directed by: Kan Mukai
- Written by: Yutaka Sō
- Produced by: Kan Mukai
- Starring: Kozue Katori; Mari Nagisa
- Distributed by: Mukai Productions; Kanto Movies
- Release date: October 1968
- Running time: 68 minutes
- Country: Japan
- Language: Japanese

Modern Female Ninja: Flesh Hell (Japanese: 現代くノ一肉地獄, Hepburn: Gendai Kunoichi Niku Jigoku) aka Inferno of the Flesh is a 1968 Japanese pink film directed by Kan Mukai. It is in the part-color format which was used in pink films in the late 1960s and early 1970s before full-color was made standard with the introduction of Nikkatsu's Roman porno series.

== Synopsis ==
One member of a secret society of female ninjas in contemporary Tokyo is kidnapped by international slave traders. The other female ninjas set about rescuing her.

== Cast ==
- Kozue Katori as Keiko (spy)
- Mari Nagisa as Akemi (spy)
- Jōji Ōhara as Boss of female ninjas

== Critical appraisal ==
Director Kan Mukai was known for both his sex-oriented pink films and for his adeptness with action. In their Japanese Cinema Encyclopedia: The Sex Films the Weissers write that with Modern Female Ninja: Flesh Hell Mukai combined his talents for both genres into one film. They give the film three out of four stars, characterizing it as, "Tongue-in-cheek fun, combining some surprisingly vicious S&M sequences with campy female-ninja hijinx." One of the earlier films from Mukai's independent Mukai Studios, the Weissers speculate that this film may have been an inspiration for director Masahiro Kasai's popular Female Neo Ninjas (1991).

== Bibliography ==
=== English ===
- Gendai kunoichi niku jigoku (1968) at IMDb
- "GENDAI KUNOICHI NIKU JIGOKU". Complete Index to World Film.
- Weisser, Thomas; Yuko Mihara Weisser (1998). Japanese Cinema Encyclopedia: The Sex Films. Miami: Vital Books : Asian Cult Cinema Publications. ISBN 1-889288-52-7.

=== Japanese ===
- 現代くノ一肉地獄 (in Japanese). Japanese Movie Database.
- 現代くノ一肉地獄 (in Japanese). Japanese Cinema Database (Agency for Cultural Affairs).
