= Mitsuyasu Maeno =

Japanese actor and failed assassin (1946–1976)

Soichiro Maeno
- Born: Mitsuyasu Maeno; 1946; Sasazuka, Shibuya-ku, Tokyo, Japan
- Died: March 23, 1976 (aged 29); Setagaya, Tokyo, Japan
- Cause of death: Suicide attack by plane crash
- Occupation: Pornographic actor

Mitsuyasu Maeno (前野 光保, Maeno Mitsuyasu; c. 1946 – March 23, 1976) was a Japanese actor who appeared in roman porno films as Soichiro Maeno (前野 霜一郎, Maeno Sōichirō). Outside of acting, Maeno was associated with the Japanese ultranationalist movement. In March 1976, he carried out a suicide attack on Yoshio Kodama, a multi-millionaire right-wing leader and leading figure in the Lockheed bribery scandals. Maeno attempted to kill Kodama by flying a plane into his home, but Kodama survived uninjured.

== Background ==
Soichiro Maeno was born Mitsuyasu Maeno in 1946. He attended classes in acting at the University of California in 1967. Maeno was married twice, both marriages ending in divorce. His troubled personal life also included a suicide attempt.

According to his father, Maeno came under the influence of the right-wing and ultranationalistic philosophies of the writer Yukio Mishima. In November 1970, Mishima had attempted to incite the Self-Defense Forces to overthrow the 1947 Constitution of Japan. When his efforts to restore Japan to a wartime samurai ethic failed, Mishima performed ritual suicide.

In contrast to the vocal right-wing, numbering approximately 120,000 in 1976, the "secret" or "romantic" rightists which Maeno joined harbored a hatred of Japan's 1947 "Peace Constitution", and idolized the samurai beliefs of bushido. According to contemporary estimates, this group numbered between 10,000 and 30,000 in the mid-1970s.

In 1971, Maeno attended a meeting of ultra-nationalists in Tokyo's Okura Hotel. Featured at the meeting was "Song of the Race", a composition by right-wing leader, Yoshio Kodama. The lyrics to the song, which the meeting promoted as the new national anthem, called for an overthrow of the government and a restoration of Japan's World War II Imperial policies. Kodama had been associated with yakuza and ultra-nationalism since the war years and had served two years in prison as a Class A war criminal. One of the most powerful figures in post-war Japan, he was largely responsible for the yakuza's resurgence. Though Maeno had no real political connections, he came to admire Kodama as an ultra-nationalist leader.

== Acting career ==
Maeno had difficulty in getting work in film and began appearing in softcore pornographic films because of the better pay. By 1976, more than two-thirds of Japan's films were in the pink film genre in which Maeno appeared. Nikkatsu, Japan's oldest studio, had been specializing in these softcore pink films since late 1971, and by the time of his death he had appeared in about twenty of the company's roman porno films. He had most recently appeared in his best-known role, Nikkatsu's Tokyo Emmanuelle (1976), for which he received screen billing. In this film he had sex with the popular actress Kumi Taguchi while flying a plane. The film was the half-Caucasian Taguchi's debut for Nikkatsu, having appeared previously in films for Toei, including Tokyo Deep Throat (1975). Tokyo Emmanuelle later became the first of Nikkatsu's roman pornos to be distributed in Britain.

Maeno was also an amateur pilot and was registered at the Taiyo Flying Club. According to flight instructor Kiyoshi Yagi, Maeno had told him before the attack that he intended to crash his plane into Kodama's home.

== Lockheed scandal ==
In early 1976, Japan was scandalized by news of the Lockheed bribery scandals, and the involvement of the highest levels of Japanese political power, including Yoshio Kodama. Kodama had been confined to his house since suffering a stroke in 1975. He was accused of accepting more than seven million dollars from the Lockheed Corporation to bribe Japanese officials to facilitate sales of their airplanes.

Maeno, disillusioned by a man he had previously respected, told friends that he believed Kodama had betrayed the right-wing and the samurai code which he espoused. The extreme brand of nationalism to which Kodama and Maeno adhered had generally remained hidden from public eye until Kodama's exposure in the Lockheed scandal. Calling Kodama a "shameful person", he considered the lobbyist's acceptance of money from Lockheed to be a national disgrace.

== Attack ==
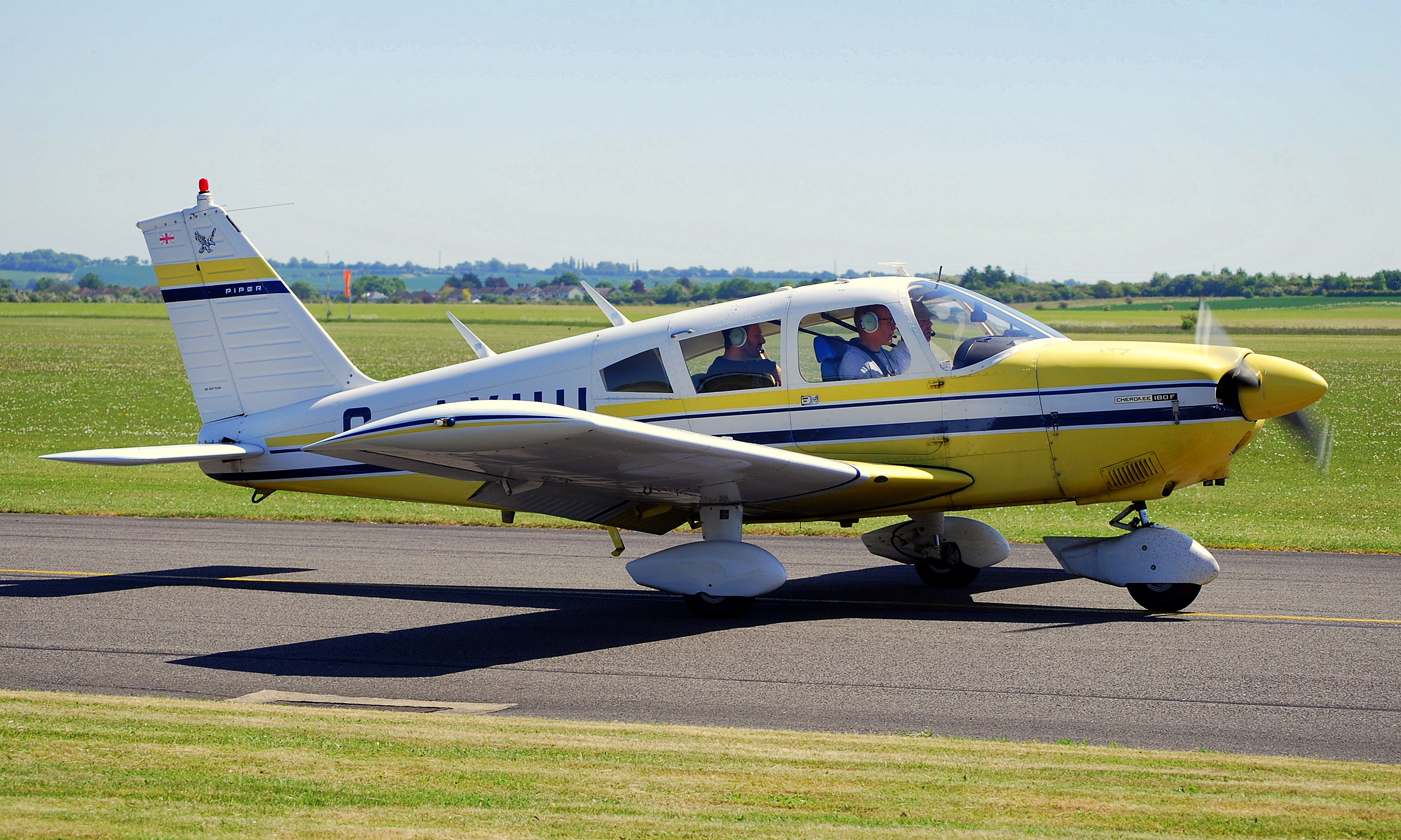
A Piper Cherokee plane, the kind used in the attack

In early March 1976, Maeno flew around Kodama's neighborhood in Setagaya, gaining knowledge of the area in preparation for an attack. On the morning of March 23, 1976, Maeno arrived in the western suburbs of Tokyo at Chofu Airport with two friends. All three were dressed in the uniforms of kamikaze pilots, and Maeno informed airport officials that they were renting two planes for a kamikaze segment of a film. The flight was to prepare publicity for a planned film on the suicide bombers. Before 9:00 a.m., the actor posed in his uniform, with white scarf, rising-sun images on his sleeve, and a headband in front of the Piper Cherokee plane he had rented.

With Maeno in one plane and his two companions in the other, they flew around Tokyo for about one hour. Maeno then told his friends that he had business in Setagaya – Kodama's neighborhood. The other plane, with the cameraman on board, accompanied Maeno on the flight to Kodama's residence. Maeno flew low over Kodama's home, circling twice before diving into the building. An amateur radio operator reported that at 9:50 a.m. he heard Maeno call out "JA3551" – the number of his plane – and then saying emotionally, "Sorry I haven't replied for a long time. Long live the Emperor! (天皇陛下万歳, Tennō heika banzai!)," after which the transmission suddenly ceased.

Maeno hit the second floor veranda of the home and died in the crash. The crash caused a fire, which started on the second floor of the home, and two servants were injured. Kodama was resting in another part of the building when Maeno attacked. He was not injured and was carried from his home in a blanket. Kodama's yakuza bodyguards then went quickly to work to stop the fire. Angered, the guards attacked reporters who arrived on the scene. The reporters later complained that police had warned them not to "excite the young men".

When news of the attack became known, a group of approximately twenty right-wing demonstrators arrived on the scene and clashed with the police in front of Kodama's home. At first fearing a conspiracy, police later confirmed that Maeno had acted on his own.

== Reaction ==
Maeno's suicide flight inspired a variety of reactions in Japan. According to an Associated Press article, many Japanese felt some sympathy with Maeno's actions because of the shame associated with the Lockheed scandal. The scandal had shown an unsavory side of Japanese politics to the world, and there was a sense of frustration that the high-ranking politicians who had dealt with Kodama would never be revealed or brought to justice.

Many, however, also equally rejected the ideological motives behind Maeno's attack. An editorial in the Mainichi Shimbun asked the question, "Is it imaginable that a young German, not a wartime officer, would commit suicide in a Nazi uniform, shouting 'Heil Hitler!'? Coming more than 30 years after the end of World War II, Maeno's kamikaze flight revived the ghost the Japanese wanted to forget."

Keiichi Ito, the director-general for training of the Japan Self-Defense Forces, said that Maeno's act was tainted by self-serving motives, not in self-sacrifice for the country. Ito, who was a surviving member of the tokkōtai, or kamikaze units, said "Maeno was performing an egotistical, grandstand play to win publicity, not unlike Mishima's suicide. Both were showing off to the world." Nevertheless, Ito commended Maeno's technique in the attack. Commenting that, if Maeno's intent had been to kill Kodama, he could not have known where he would be located within the house. Ito said the bombing was, "very skillful, I give him the highest marks on that score."

Lockheed scandal historian David Boulton writes that the attack on one of the leading figures by a pornographic actor, "aptly summed up the obscenity of it all."

== Aftermath ==
Kodama was unharmed in the attack and went on trial in June 1977. The trial was postponed. Before it had been concluded, on January 17, 1984, Kodama suffered another stroke and died peacefully. Shortly before his death, the right-wing leader had expressed the view that he was being punished for taking money from Lockheed, a company that had built aircraft to fight Japan during World War II.

In the years after his death, Maeno's Roman Porno appearances attracted a cult following among enthusiasts of the genre.

== Filmography ==
Year	Title	Role
1964	The Sound of Waves	Ryuji Hayashi
1970	Stray Cat Rock: Wild Jumbo	Debo
1971	Apartment Wife: Affair in the Afternoon	Hatanaka

== Sources ==
- Kodama (1976-04-05). "Japan: Kamikaze Over Tokyo". Time.
