= Takekuni Hirayoshi =

Japanese composer

- Born: July 10, 1936; Japan Hyōgo Prefecture
- Died: May 28, 1998 (aged 61)
- Other name: 平吉 毅州
- Occupation: composer

Takekuni Hirayoshi (平吉 毅州, Hirayoshi Takekuni; July 10, 1936 in Kobe, Hyōgo Prefecture – May 28, 1998) was a Japanese classical composer.

== Biography ==
Takekuni Hirayoshi graduated from Tokyo University of the Arts Department of Music in 1961 and completed his graduate work there in 1967. He studied with Yoshio Hasegawa (長谷川良夫) and Yoshiho Ikuma (伊熊良穂). He was the 1969 recipient of the Otaka Award (尾高賞). Subsequently, he was a part-time lecturer at Tokyo University of the Arts, and professor at Toho Gakuen School of Music and Okinawa Prefectural University of Arts.

The compositions of Hirayoshi encompass many genres, among which his many popular choral works are notable. In his later years, he focused on piano music for children.

== Selected works ==
The compositions of Takekuni Hirayoshi are published mainly by the Japan Federation of Composers, Ongaku-no-Tomo Sha and Edition Kawai.

Orchestral

- Composition (コンポジション) for orchestra
- Ballade (バラード) for orchestra
- Epitaph (エピタフ) for string orchestra (1971)
- Symphonic Variations (交響変奏曲)
- Umi no aru fūkei (海のある風景)

Band

- Composition for symphonic band (シンフォニックバンドのためのコンポジション)
- Rhapsody for symphonic band (シンフォニック・バンドのためのラプソディ)
- High School Festival Prelude (高校祝典序曲) (1978); commissioned for the 70th anniversary of Hyōgo High School

Concertante

- Requiem (レクイエム) for violin and orchestra
- Concerto (ギター協奏曲) for guitar and orchestra (1980)

Chamber music

- Impromptu for Three Players for flute, violin and piano (1970)
- Preludio e fantasia for guitar (1970)
- Kaze no Uta (風の歌 Song of the Wind) for 2 marimbas (1973)
- Samba Canción (サンバ・カンシオン) for clarinet and Piano
- Hoshi tachi no utage ni (星たちの宴に Stars Party) for string quintet

Piano

- Kānibaru ga yatte kita (カーニバルがやってきた The Carnival Has Come)
- Elegy (エレジー) (1997)
- Habanera (ハバネラ)
- Niji no rizumu (虹のリズム Rainbow Rhythm) (1979); collection of compositions for children
- Minami no kaze (南の風 South Wind); collection of compositions for children
- Haru ni nattara (春になったら When Spring Comes...)

Vocal

- Aozora ni noborou (青空に登ろう); nursery song
- Hatsukoi (初恋 First Love) for baritone, violin and piano 4-hands
- Hitotsu no asa (ひとつの朝 One Morning) for chorus
- Kikyū ni notte dokomade mo (気球にのってどこまでも) for children's chorus
- Ōkina yume no māchi (大きな夢のマーチ); nursery song
- Sasurai no funaji (さすらいの船路), Suite for male chorus (published 1994)
- Shiokaze no samba (潮風のサンバ) for chorus
- Sora ni kotori ga inaku natta hi (空に小鳥がいなくなった日) for mixed chorus and piano
- Umi no fushigi (海の不思議) for chorus
- Wakai tsubasa wa (若い翼は) for chorus
- Yume (夢 Dream), Sketch for mixed chorus and piano

Film scores

- Hans Christian Andersen's The Little Mermaid (1975)
