= 1975 in Japanese television =

Events in 1975 in Japanese television.

== Events ==
- March 31 - 1975 Osaka television affiliation switch
- October 1 - TV Shinhiroshima and Higashinihon Broadcasting launch. The seven metropolitan areas (Hokkaido, Miyagi, Kanto, Tokai, Kansai, Hiroshima, Fukuoka) now have affiliates of all four networks.

== Debuts ==
Show	Station	Premiere Date	Genre	Original Run
Adventures of Pepero the Andes Boy	NET	October 6	anime	October 6, 1975 – March 29, 1976
Akumaizer 3	NET	October 7	tokusatsu	October 7, 1975 – June 29, 1976
Arabian Nights: Sinbad's Adventures	Fuji TV	October 1	anime	October 1, 1975 – September 29, 1976
Akumaizer 3	NET	April 4	anime	April 4, 1975 – March 26, 1976
Bouken Rockbat	Fuji TV	March 31	tokusatsu	March 31, 1975 – September 27, 1975
Boy Detectives Seven	Nippon TV	October 4	tokusatsu	October 4, 1975 – March 27, 1976
Dog of Flanders	Fuji TV	January 5	anime	January 5, 1975 – December 28, 1975
Don Chuck Monogatari	Tokyo Channel 12	April 5	anime	April 5, 1975 – September 27, 1975
Ganba no Bōken	Nippon TV	April 7	anime	April 7, 1975 – September 29, 1975
Ganso Tensai Bakabon	Nippon TV	October 6	anime	October 6, 1975 – September 26, 1977
Getter Robo G	Fuji TV	May 15	anime	May 15, 1975 – March 25, 1976
G-Men '75	TBS	May 24	drama	May 24, 1975 – April 3, 1982
Himitsu Sentai Gorenger	NET	April 5	tokusatsu	April 5, 1975 – March 26, 1977
Ikkyū-san	NET	October 15	anime	October 15, 1975 – June 28, 1982
Kamen Rider Stronger	TBS	April 5	tokusatsu	April 5, 1975 - December 27, 1975
La Seine no Hoshi	Fuji TV	April 4	anime	April 4, 1975 – December 26, 1975
Laura, the Prairie Girl	TBS	October 7	anime	October 7, 1975 – March 30, 1976
Panel Quiz Attack 25	ABC	April 6	game show	April 6, 1975 – present
Seigi no Shinboru Condorman	NET	March 31	tokusatsu	March 31, 1975 – September 22, 1975
Steel Jeeg	NET	October 5	anime	October 5, 1975 – August 29, 1976
Tekkaman The Space Knight	NET	July 2	anime	July 2, 1975 – December 24, 1975
The Adventures of Maya the Honey Bee	NET	April 1	anime	April 1, 1975 – April 20, 1976
Time Bokan	Fuji TV	October 4	anime	October 4, 1975 – December 25, 1976
UFO Robot Grendizer	Fuji TV	May 15	anime	May 15, 1975 – March 25, 1976
Wanpaku Omukashi Kum-Kum	TBS	October 3	anime	October 3, 1975 - March 26, 1976

== Ongoing ==
- Music Fair, music (1964–present)
- Hachiji da yo! Zen'in shūgō, comedy (1969-1985)
- Mito Kōmon, jidaigeki (1969-2011)
- Sazae-san, anime (1969–present)
- Ōedo Sōsamō, jidaigeki (1970-1984)
- Ōoka Echizen, jidaigeki (1970-1999)
- Star Tanjō!, talent (1971-1983)
- First Human Giatrus, anime (1974-1976)
- Ganbare!! Robocon, tokusatsu (1974-1977)
- FNS Music Festival, music (1974–present)

== Endings ==
Show	Station	Ending Date	Genre	Original Run
Akai Meiro	TBS	March 28	drama	October 4, 1974 – March 28, 1975
Ai to Makoto	Tokyo Channel 12	March 28	drama	October 4, 1974 – March 28, 1975
Calimero	NET	September 30	anime	October 15, 1974 – September 30, 1975
Chiisana Viking Bikke	Fuji TV	September 24	anime	April 3, 1974 – September 24, 1975
Denjin Zaborger	Fuji TV	June 29	tokusatsu	April 6, 1974 – June 29, 1975
Dog of Flanders	Fuji TV	December 28	anime	January 5, 1975 – December 28, 1975
Don Chuck Monogatari	Tokyo Channel 12	September 27	anime	April 5, 1975 – September 27, 1975
Ganba no Bōken	Nippon TV	September 29	anime	April 7, 1975 – September 29, 1975
Getter Robo	Fuji TV	May 8	anime	April 4, 1974 – May 8, 1975
Great Mazinger	Fuji TV	September 28	anime	September 8, 1974 – September 28, 1975
Hurricane Polymar	NET	March 28	anime	October 4, 1974 – March 28, 1975
Kamen Rider Amazon	NET	March 29	tokusatsu	October 19, 1974 – March 29, 1975
Kamen Rider Stronger	TBS	December 27	tokusatsu	April 5, 1975 - December 27, 1975
La Seine no Hoshi	Fuji TV	December 26	anime	April 4, 1975 – December 26, 1975
Majokko Megu-chan	NET	September 29	anime	April 1, 1974 - September 29, 1975
Sci-Fi Drama: Army of the Apes	TBS	March 30	tokusatsu	October 6, 1974 – March 30, 1975
Space Battleship Yamato	Yomiuri TV	March 30	anime	October 6, 1974 – March 30, 1975
Super Robot Mach Baron	Nippon TV	March 31	tokusatsu	October 7, 1974 – March 31, 1975
Tekkaman The Space Knight	NET	December 24	anime	July 2, 1975 – December 24, 1975
Ultraman Leo	TBS	March 28	tokusatsu	April 12, 1974 – March 28, 1975

== See also ==
- 1975 in anime
- 1975 in Japan
- List of Japanese films of 1975
