= Maria Mori =

- Born: June 29, 1955 (age 69); Sapporo, Japan
- Origin: Japan
- Genres: Pop
- Occupation(s): Singer-songwriter, actress
- Instrument: Vocals
- Years active: 1972–present

Maria Mori (森マリア, born June 29, 1956) is a former singer and actress from Sapporo, Japan. She was also known as Maria Elizabeth. The daughter of an American FBI agent and a Japanese mother, she was a member of the Golden Half singing group, whose other members all had Japanese mothers and fathers from other countries. The group was active from 1970 to 1974 and appeared as regulars on the Tokyo Broadcasting System Saturday prime-time variety show Hachiji da yo! Zen'in shūgō which also featured the comedy group The Drifters and idol singers The Candies.

Individually, Maria appeared in the television jidaigeki series Edo o Kiru and Yuki-hime Onmitsu Dōchūki and from 1988 to 1993 as Oryū in the TBS television series in Ōoka Echizen. She made guest appearances on Abarenbō Shōgun as well as in contemporary dramas including G-men 75, and co-hosted Chibikko Avec Utagassen.

== Sources ==
This article incorporates material from 森マリア (Mori Maria), ゴールデンハーフ (Gōruden Hāfu), and 8時だョ!全員集合 (Hachiji da yo! Zen'in Shūgō) in the Japanese Wikipedia, retrieved on February 12, 2008.
