= Inflatable Sex Doll of the Wastelands =

1967 Japanese film

- Theatrical poster for Inflatable Sex Doll of the Wastelands (1967)
- Directed by: Atsushi Yamatoya
- Written by: Atsushi Yamatoya
- Produced by: Akio Yamoto
- Starring: Noriko Tatsumi; Yūichi Minato
- Cinematography: Hajime Kai
- Music by: Yōsuke Yamashita
- Production company: Yamatoya Productions
- Distributed by: Kokuei
- Release date: 3 October 1967 (Japan)
- Running time: 85 minutes
- Country: Japan
- Language: Japanese

Inflatable Sex Doll of the Wastelands (荒野のダッチワイフ, Kōya no Datchi Waifu) aka Dutch Wife of the Wasteland and The Dutch Wives of the Wild, originally released as Horror Doll (恐怖人形, Kyōfu Ningyō), is a 1967 Japanese pink film written and directed by cult filmmaker Atsushi Yamatoya, starring the first "Queen" of pink film, Noriko Tatsumi, and with music by the jazz pianist Yōsuke Yamashita.

== Synopsis ==
A wealthy real estate investor receives a film showing the rape and murder of his girlfriend. He hires a private detective, and shows him the film—which he criticizes for its poor cinematography—so that the detective can find the criminals and bring them to justice. The detective discovers that the woman is not dead, but does not inform his employer because the detective has romantic intentions towards her as well. His search leads him to a warehouse in the wastelands, filled with flies and sex dolls modeled on the woman. A gunshot is heard and the detective is engaged in target practice in the desert with the realtor. The realtor says he has a case he would like to be investigated, which returns the film to the first scene.

== Cast ==
- Noriko Tatsumi as Sae
- Yūichi Minato (港雄一) as Jō
- Miki Watari (渡みき) as Mina
- Shōhei Yamamoto (山本昌平) as Kō
- Seigi [Masayoshi] Nogami (野上正義) as Naka
- Hatsuo Yamaya (山谷初男) as Doctor
- Mari Nagisa (渚マリ) as Rie
- Akaji Maro (麿赤兒)
- Taka Ôkubo (大久保鷹)
- Kohei Tsuzaki (津崎公平)

== Background ==
Director Atsushi Yamatoya was one of the group of writers on Seijun Suzuki's Branded to Kill (1967). Yamatoya had co-directed the pink film Season of Betrayal (裏切りの季節) with Kōji Wakamatsu in 1966, but Inflatable Sex Doll of the Wastelands was his solo feature film directorial debut. He directed a few more pink films such as The Pistol That Sprouted Hair (毛の生えた拳銃) for Wakamatsu's production company, but found writing to be more to his taste. He often wrote anonymously for Wakamatsu during the 1960s, and was later regularly credited for his script work at Nikkatsu on their Roman porno series. He revisited the sex-doll theme in his script to Chūsei Sone's Roman porno Love Doll Report: An Adult Toy (1975). Sone was one of Yamatoya's co-workers on Branded to Kill, and Yamatoya wrote several of Sone's Roman porno scripts, notably Showa Woman: Naked Rashomon, an erotic restructuring of Kurosawa's Rashomon (1950).

Yukihiro Sawada, who worked with Yamatoya on the script for Inflatable Sex Doll of the Wastelands, also went on to work at Nikkatsu, where he directed such Roman porno's as Sex Hunter: Wet Target (1972). During the filming of Inflatable Sex Doll of the Wastelands, lead actors Noriko Tatsumi and Yūichi Minato worked together on director Ario Takeda's pink film Love's Milky Drops for Okura Eiga studio. This film used the same sets as Yamatoya's.

== Critical appraisal ==
In their Japanese Cinema Encyclopedia: The Sex Films, the Weissers write that Inflatable Sex Doll of the Wastelands is "one of the major cult films of the '60s". They give the film a rating of three out of four stars, noting that, due to the surrealistic and hallucinatory nature of the plot, the film may not be to all viewers' tastes. They judge the film is "even more eccentric" than director Seijun Suzuki's Branded to Kill (1967), which Atsushi Yamatoya helped write. According to the Weissers, despite several very erotic scenes, because the film emphasizes a hard-boiled mystery plot rather than sexploitation, it is not technically a pink film.

Jasper Sharp writes that the film shows how versatile the pink film genre could sometimes be, calling it "probably the most idiosyncratic work the genre has ever produced", and noting that it out-does Suzuki's Branded to Kill in terms of "dreamlike illogicality". Of the plot, Sharp writes that, in spite of its disjointed nature, "as with Suzuki's film, there is clearly some method behind the onscreen madness". Sharp remarks that a comparison with Suzuki's better-known film is inevitable. Besides the sharing of a main character's name ("Joe") with the star of Suzuki's film (Joe Shishido), Sharp lists some similarities between the films: "the striking high-contrast monochrome cinematography; the quirky, hard-boiled performances; the hypnotic disjunction between sound and image; the use of montage to construct a surreal, alien-looking landscape that bears little resemblance to any recognisable vision of Japan; and the atonal jazz soundtrack, full of chaotic fanfares that blare out to punctuate the action."

== Availability ==
Inflatable Sex Doll of the Wastelands, first known as Horror Doll, was released theatrically on October 3, 1967. It was released in VHS format in Japan in May 1997, and on DVD on August 23, 2002. Chirashis, or movie flyers, advertised this DVD release as "60s Sex Play". The film's title was also used for a book on Yamatoya's films issued in June 1994. Deaf Crocodile released the film on Blu-ray in 2025, with both limited deluxe and standard editions.

== Bibliography ==
=== English ===
- Cowie, Peter, ed. (1977). "Japan". World Filmography 1967. London: Tantivy Press. p. 378. ISBN 978-0-498-01565-6.
- Kôya no Dacchi waifu (1967) at IMDb
- Sharp, Jasper (2008). Behind the Pink Curtain: The Complete History of Japanese Sex Cinema. Guildford: FAB Press. pp. 59–60, 85, 96, 102, 367. ISBN 978-1-903254-54-7.
- Weisser, Thomas; Yuko Mihara Weisser (1998). Japanese Cinema Encyclopedia: The Sex Films. Miami: Vital Books : Asian Cult Cinema Publications. ISBN 978-1-889288-52-9.

=== Japanese ===
- 荒野のダッチワイフ(1967) (in Japanese). allcinema.net.
- 荒野のダッチワイフ (in Japanese). Japanese Movie Database.
- 荒野のダッチワイフ (in Japanese). Japanese Cinema Database (Agency for Cultural Affairs). Archived from the original on 11 March 2012.
