= Children Drawing Rainbows =

- DVD cover
- Directed by: Mariko Miyagi
- Release date: 1975
- Country: Japan
- Language: Japanese

Children Drawing Rainbows (Japanese: 虹をかける子どもたち, Hepburn: Niji o kakeru kodomo-tachi), also known as Children Running Across the Rainbow, is a 1975 Japanese documentary film directed by Mariko Miyagi.
