= The Bite =

- US poster
- Directed by: Kan Mukai
- Written by: Miki Yamada
- Produced by: Teruo Yamoto
- Starring: Senjo Ichiriki; Michiko Shiroyami
- Cinematography: Jiro Suzuki
- Production companies: Kokuei; Tōkyō Geijutsu Pro
- Distributed by: Olympic International Films (US 1960s); Cinema Epoch (US 2008)
- Release date: August 1, 1966
- Running time: 62 minutes
- Country: Japan
- Languages: Japanese; English (film exists only in dubbed version)

The Bite (Japanese: 餌, Hepburn: Esa) a.k.a. Bait (1966) is a Japanese pink film directed by Hiroshi Mukai, credited as "Kan Mukai" in the international English-dubbed version, and starring Senjo Ichiriki and Michiko Shiroyami.

== Synopsis ==
A gigolo is paid by a rich older woman to seduce young girls while she and friends watch his sexual conquests behind a two-way mirror. He tries to break free of the older woman's control, but when his sick mother needs an operation, he returns to the rich woman, having sex with her for money. Humiliated by his dependency, he takes the woman's daughter to the love-show, where he rapes her in front of her mother.

== Cast ==
- Michiko Shiroyami
- Senjo Ichiriki
- Machiko Matsumoto
- Keisuke Senda
- Natsue Hanaha

== Release ==
Olympic International Films released The Bite to the U.S. grindhouse circuit soon after its original release in Japan. The film was released in Britain in 1967 as Bait.

Since its first run, The Bite had been considered a lost film. Jasper Sharp notes that had it not been for the overseas release of films like The Bite, these films would likely not be available today, as many early pink films were not saved in Japan.

== Home media ==
The film was rediscovered and released in an English-dubbed version on region-0 DVD by Gregory Hatanaka's Cinema Epoch label on May 13, 2008. Preceding the DVD release, Portland, Oregon's Clinton Street Theater played The Bite on a double feature with Mamoru Watanabe's Slave Widow (1967) on May 9 and May 11, 2008.

== Bibliography ==
- "The Bite". 10kbullets.com. Archived from the original on 2009-03-05.
- The Bite at IMDb
- "ESA". British Film Institute. Archived from the original on 2009-09-11.
- Krafsur, Richard P. (1976). "The Bite (Japan) F6.0425". American Film Institute Catalog of Motion Pictures, The; Feature Films 1961-70. New York & London: R.R. Bowker Company. p. 94. ISBN 0-8352-0440-5.
- 餌 (in Japanese). Japanese Movie Database.
