= Cloistered Nun: Runa's Confession =

- Theatrical poster
- Directed by: Masaru Konuma
- Starring: Luna Takamura; Kumi Taguchi
- Distributed by: Nikkatsu
- Release date: January 8, 1976 (Japan)
- Running time: 74 minutes
- Country: Japan
- Language: Japanese

Cloistered Nun: Runa's Confession (修道女ルナの告白, Shudojo Runa no kokuhaku) (1976) is a Japanese pink film in the nunsploitation genre starring pop singer Luna Takamura, directed by Masaru Konuma and produced by Nikkatsu. AllRovi reports of the film, "As Konuma is not one to pull political punches for the sake of lightweight erotic fluff, the film is far more pointed than the numerous European 'sexy nun' films it ostensibly resembles." Jasper Sharp calls it "a typically profane offering in the most peculiar of Nikkatsu's pornographic subgenres".

== Synopsis ==
Young Runa/Luna entered a convent after losing her boyfriend to her sister Kumi. Her dream of a tranquil life at the convent is shattered when she is raped by the abbot and introduced to a life of torture and abuse. Leaving the convent, she returns to her sister and former boyfriend to exact revenge by snaring them in a bogus financial scheme promoting Christianity in Japan and then departing with their money and a lesbian lover from the convent.

== Cast ==
- Luna Takamura as Runa/Luna
- Aoi Nakajima
- Kumi Taguchi as Kumi
- Roger Prince as the Abbot
- Yōko Azusa
- Shin Nakamaru

== Home media ==
A region 1 DVD release of Cloistered Nun: Runa's Confession with English subtitles was released by KimStim on July 1, 2013.

== Sources ==
- "修道女ルナの告白 (Shudojo Runa no kokuhaku)" (in Japanese). Japanese Movie Database.
- Weisser, Thomas; Yuko Mihara Weisser (1998). Japanese Cinema Encyclopedia: The Sex Films. Miami: Vital Books : Asian Cult Cinema Publications. pp. 79–80. ISBN 1-889288-52-7.
- Sharp, Jasper (2008). Behind the Pink Curtain: The Complete History of Japanese Sex Cinema. Guildford: FAB Press. pp. 144, 349. ISBN 978-1-903254-54-7.
