= Ukiyo-e Cruel Story =

Ukiyoe Cruel Story
- Poster of Ukiyoe Cruel Story (1968)
- Directed by: Tetsuji Takechi
- Written by: Dosuke Haguro
- Starring: Tamawa Karina; Noriko Tatsumi; Ryuji Inazuma
- Cinematography: Seishiro Fukami
- Music by: Sukehisa Shiba
- Distributed by: Daiei; Takechi Productions
- Release date: September 7, 1968
- Running time: 86 minutes
- Country: Japan
- Language: Japanese

Ukiyoe Cruel Story (浮世絵残酷物語, Ukiyoe Zankoku Monogatari) is a 1968 Japanese pink film directed by the "Father of Pink", Tetsuji Takechi, and starring the current "Queen" of Pink, Noriko Tatsumi. Made after Takechi had won an obscenity trial over Black Snow (1965), the film has been called "Takechi's personal message to Eirin." Though still containing significant erotic content, this is one of Takechi's few films to pass the censor relatively unedited, perhaps because Eirin feared losing another embarrassing public confrontation with the outspoken director. In October 2006 Ukiyoe Cruel Story was shown as part of a Takechi retrospective, and it was released on DVD in Japan on January 25, 2008.

== Sources ==
- "UKIYOE ZANKOKU MONOGATARI". Complete Index to World Film.
- Ukiyoe zangoku monogatari at IMDb
- "浮世絵残酷物語 (Ukiyoe zankoku monogatari)" (in Japanese). Japanese Movie Database.
- "Ukiyo-e Cruel Story". UniJapan Film Quarterly. 11 (4): 4. October 1968.
- Weisser, Thomas; Yuko Mihara Weisser (1998). Japanese Cinema Encyclopedia: The Sex Films. Miami: Vital Books: Asian Cult Cinema Publications. ISBN 1-889288-52-7.
- 浮世絵残酷物語 (in Japanese). www.cinematopics.com. Archived from the original on 2011-07-21.
