= Kan Mukai =

Japanese film director, cinematographer, producer and screenwriter

- Japanese film director, Kan Mukai
- Born: Hiroki Mukae; October 16, 1937; Dairen, Manchukuo
- Died: June 9, 2008 (aged 70); Tokyo, Japan
- Occupations: Film director, cinematographer, producer and screenwriter
- Years active: 1962–2004
- Spouse: Takako Uchida
- Website: https://web.archive.org/web/20091111115700/http://www.kuruma.org/mukai/

Kan Mukai (向井寛, Mukai Kan) a.k.a. Hiroshi Mukai and Patrick Kan (カン・パトリック, Kan Patorikku; October 16, 1937 — June 9, 2008) was a Japanese film director, cinematographer, producer and screenwriter, known for his pioneering work in the pink film genre. In the realm of pink cinema, Japanese critics have estimated that Mukai is "the only serious rival of Kōji Wakamatsu." As a producer, Mukai helped the early careers of many prominent directors, including Hisayasu Satō and Academy-Award winner Yōjirō Takita. In his career, he directed nearly 200 films and produced approximately 500.

== Life and career ==
=== Early career and 1960s ===
Kan Mukai was born in Dairen, Manchukuo (modern Dalian, China) on October 16, 1937. He studied economics at Kyushu University, but dropped out to pursue a career in film. In 1959 he began his apprenticeship, serving as assistant director to Kiyoshi Saeki, Tadashi Imai and Isao Yoshida. He also worked as a cinematographer on projects for various studios, mostly for educational, children's and industrial films. During this early period in his career he honed his craft and became known as a top cinematographer.

Mukai made his debut as a director in 1962 with Two Boys (二人の少年), an educational film. Wanting to direct, but lacking the educational requirements necessary to be hired as a director at a major studio, in 1965, Mukai moved into the lucrative new pink film genre. That year he founded Mukai Productions and, with financial backing from Nihon Cinema, directed his first pink feature, Flesh (肉, Niku), which was distributed by Kokuei. Though the film was a plotless series of scenes in the life of a prostitute, Mukai's technical skill impressed early pink audiences and critics, and he quickly became a major name in the genre. Comparing him to the major pink director of the 1960s, a critic for Kinema Junpo wrote, "Hiroshi Mukai is the only genre director who could rival Kōji Wakamatsu." Flesh received international distribution, and was released in Germany on May 14, 1965 as Nacktes Fleisch. The Bite (1966) was another early Mukai film shown overseas, playing in the U.S. soon after its Japanese release, and in Britain, under the title Bait, in 1967. It was released on DVD in the U.S. in 2008.

According to some sources, Mukai's Sexy Partners (1967) was the first S&M film. It was the first to use the subject as its primary theme. He worked with his wife, actress Takako Uchida, in several of his early films such as Nightly Pleasure (Yoru No Yorokobi, 1967), Stories of Adultery (Aru Mittsu, 1967), and Spring of Ecstasy (Kokotsu No Izumi, 1968). Stories of Adultery was a three-part omnibus film, with other two segments directed by Kōji Wakamatsu and Shin'ya Yamamoto (director). Mukai's section was titled Beauty and Ugliness (Bi To Shu). Takako Uchida later starred in Nikkatsu's big-budget pre-Roman Porno venture into the pink arena, Story Of Heresy In Meiji Era (1968). Mukai gave future first Nikkatsu Roman Porno star, Kazuko Shirakawa, her film debut with the 1967 film Girls' Dormitory. Until that studio's reorganization in 1967, Mukai's films were released principally through Kanto Films. In 1968, Mukai founded his own studio, and Shameful Technique (恥かしい技巧, Hazukashii Giko; 1967), was the first film released by Mukai Studios.

Mukai often employed gimmick-like elements in his films or their publicity to create audiences for his films. His Blue Film: Estimation (1968) benefitted from a publicity campaign emphasizing that mainstream actress Mitsugu Fujii was starring in this pink film. The whisper-campaign behind Flesh 2 (1969)—sequel to Mukai's debut film—focused on a sex scene between a Korean girl and a black U.S. G.I., and Japan Virgin Rape (1970) had the first lady of Indonesia in its cast. Blue Film Woman was an early all-color pink film, and Jasper Sharp writes that Mukai's use of color in this film appears to be "making up for lost time", and that the film is a "highly stylised piece." In 1969, Mukai's film Forbidden Techniques (禁じられたテクニック) (1966) was released in Italy under the title Naomi. The film was banned due to obscenity, but scored a triumph in a showing at Waseda University's Okuma Auditorium.

=== 1970s and later ===
Throughout his career Mukai was known for working in both action and sex genres, and in the 1970s, Mukai made several films in both genres, and with the two genres mixed for the Toei Company. Deep Throat in Tokyo, directed for Toei in 1975, is his best-known film. Comparing Mukai's film to the original Deep Throat (U.S., 1972), Jasper Sharp writes that Mukai's film, a softcore, "airbrushed fantasy" with a higher budget and, in Kumi Taguchi, a more attractive leading lady, is "a world apart from the more crude and direct approach taken by its revolutionary American model." Nevertheless, Sharp judges that Mukai's softcore film is more offensive than the hardcore original because of its more reactionary approach to sex.

In 1979, after the closing of his original Mukai Productions, Mukai started Shishi Productions (獅子プロダクション). The name "Shishi", meaning "Lion", was a pun on "4x4", indicating Mukai's ambition to foster the careers of 16 young directors. As producer, Mukai had an influence on the careers of the "Four Heavenly Kings of Pink" or "Four Devils" (ピンク四天王, Pinku shitennō) group of directors who came to prominence in the 1980s. Hisayasu Satō began working in the film industry through Shishi Productions in 1981, and had his directing debut there with Mad Love! Lolita Poaching (激愛！ロリータ密猟, Gekiai! Lolita Mitsuro) (1985). He continued working with Mukai throughout the decade. Takahisa Zeze also gained his first film experience at Shishi, working as a screenwriter, and assistant directing for Satō. Through Shishi Productions Mukai gave Academy-Award-winning director Yōjirō Takita his first work in the film industry.

In June 1982 Mukai re-formed Mukai Productions. As a production company, Mukai's films were distributed by other studios, including Nikkatsu, which used these films to supplement their Roman porno series triple-bills. During the 1980s, when rape-themed films were popular, Mukai produced some of Nikkatsu's most extreme examples of the genre, including the Subway Serial Rape series (1985–1988). Mukai produced celebrated Roman porno director Tatsumi Kumashiro's final film, Immoral: Indecent Relations (インモラル･淫らな関係, Immoral: Midarana Kankei) (1995).

In his later works as director Mukai moved into non-pink mainstream subjects. His Going West (1997) was what the director called, "Japan's first granny road movie". He directed a sequel to Going West entitled Hometown in 1999. Other films of this final, mainstream period in Mukai's career include Last Dance (2001) and School Reunion (2004). After battling liver cancer for two years, Mukai died on June 11, 2008.

== Partial filmography ==
Title	Release date	Starring	Studio	Notes
=== 1960s ===
Two Boys 二人の少年; Futari no shōnen	1962			Mukai's directorial debut Non-pink educational film
Flesh 肉 Niku	1965-05	Kemi Ichiboshi; Toshio Tanaka	Nihon Cinema / Tokyo Geijutsu Productions / Kokuei	81 min. B&W
Continuation: Chronicle of an Affair aka Misused 続・情事の履歴書; Zoku: jōji no rirekisho	1966-04	Tamaki Katori; Anzu Kitamika	Tokyo Geijutsu Productions / Kokuei	73 min. B&W
The Bite aka Bait 餌 Esa	1966-08	Michiko Shiroyama; Machiko Matsumoto; Senjō Ichiriki	Tokyo Geijutsu Productions	63 min. B&W
Fancy Footwork aka Forbidden Technique aka Naomi (1969 re-release title) 禁じられたテクニック; Kinjirareta Tekunikku	1966-11	Shusaku Muto; Kazuko Kano; Yuichi Minato	Nihon Cinema	75 min. B&W
Nightly Pleasure 夜の悦び; Yoru no yorokobi	1967-03-07	Takako Uchida; Jōji Ohara	Nihon Cinema / Kantō	79 min. B&W
Afternoon Rendezvous 昼下がりの逢びき; Hirusagari no aibiki	1967-03-28	Shusaku Buto; Kimiko Asuka	Nihon Cinema	75 min. B&W
Some Stories of Adultery 或る密通; Aru mittsū	1967-04-15	Mitsugu Gujii; Takako Uchida	Nihon Cinema	Beauty and Ugliness segment 73 min. B&W
Seeking for Women 女あさり; Onna asari	1967-04-15		Nihon Cinema / Mitsukuni Eiga	70 min. B&W
Girls' Dormitory 女子寮; Joshiryō	1967-05-16	Kazuko Shirakawa; Midori Hinoki; Michiko Sakyō; Kemi Ichiboshi; Yoko Shimura	Nihon Cinema / Kantō	73 min. B&W
Attachment of a Virgin 処女未練; Shojo miren	1967-05	Megumi Hoshikawa; Kumiko Arata; Shusaku Buto; Kyoji Kokonoe	Nihon Cinema
Sexy Partners aka Lustful Companions いろの道づれ; Iro No Michizure	1967-07-02	Michiko Sakyō; Jōji Ohara; Midori Enoki; Kemi Ichiboshi	Mutsukuni Eiga / 六邦映画	70 min. B&W
Report on an Abnormal Situation: Female Plastic Surgery aka Documentary: Evils Of Plastic Surgery 異常体験白書 女体整形; Ijō taiken hakusho: nyotai seikei	1967-09-04	Eri Nakakoji; Kemi Ichiboshi	Kokuei	75 min. Part color
Shameful Technique 恥かしい技巧; Hazukashii gikō	1967-09-19	Rika Mizuki; Koji Satomi	Mukai Productions / Nihon Cinema / Kantō	First release from Mukai Productions; 67 min. B&W
Certificate of Virginity 処女証明書; Shojo shōmeisho	1967-11-14	Miyuki Matsushima; Mayumi Taki	Nihon Cinema / Kantō	69 min. Part color
Rape Me! Big Battle 犯して！犯して！大合戦; Okashite! Daigassen	1967		Nihon Cinema
Technique in Private 個室のテクニック; Koshitsu No Technique	1967	Tsuneo Kawai; Hiromi Aoi	Nihon Cinema / Tokyo Koei	69 min.
Obscene Family Insignia 淫紋 処女妻姦通; Inmon: shojo-zuma kantsū	1967	Takako Uchida; Shinji Kubo; Kemi Ichiboshi	Nihon Cinema	73 min.
Blue Film: Estimation 蒼いフィルム 品さだめ; Aoi firumu shinasadame	1968-03	Mitsugu Fujii; Norihiro Ohtani; Mari Nagisa; Risa Minakami	Mukai Productions / Wakamatsu Productions	69 min. Part color
Torturing a Sensitive Spot 急所攻め; Kyūsho-zeme	1968-04	Mari Nagisa; Kozue Katori	Uematsu Productions	70 min. Part color
The Lewd Ones 陰乱; Inran	1968-05		Uematsu Productions	68 min. Part color
Raped Virgin's Diary: Female Beast 暴行少女日記 ♀（メス） Bōkō shōjo nikki: mesu	1968-07	Kemi Ichiboshi; Norihiro Ohtani; Shinji Kubo	Mukai Productions / Nihon Cinema / Kantō	81 min. Part color
History of Japanese Sexual Behavior: Forced Double Suicide 日本性風俗史 無理心中; Nihon sei fūzokushi murishinjū	1968-09	Kemi Ichiboshi; Toshio Tanaka; Mari Nagisa; Kiyoko Takeda	Asakura Productions / Kokuei	80 min. Part color
Cruel Story of a Sex Film Actress セックス女優残酷史; Sex joyū zankokushi	1968-09	Saeko Tsugawa; Yuri Yamashina	Million Film / Nihon Cinema	80 min. Part color
Modern Female Ninja: Flesh Hell 現代くノ一肉地獄; Gendai kunoichi niku jigoku	1968-10	Kozue Katori; Joji Ohara; Mari Nagisa	Mukai Productions / Kantō	68 min. Part color
Unfaithful Wife 不貞妻; Futeizuma	1968-11	Shintaro Taki; Kozue Katori; Hiroshi Jo; Kaori Aihara; Akiko Kozuki	Asakura Productions	71 min. Part color
Indecent Wife みだら妻 外道情炎; Midarazuma: gedō jōen	1968-12	Shinji Kubo; Mari Nagisa; Misa Takarai	Mukai Productions	76 min. Part color
Flesh 2 続・肉; Zoku niku	1968-12	Yuko Maya; Fred Silver	Asakura / Mukai Productions / Kokuei	73 min. Part color
Blue Film Woman ブルーフィルムの女; Burū firumu no onna	1969-01	Mitsugu Fujii; Ichirō Furuoka; Miki Hashimoto	Asakura Productions	80 min. Color
=== 1970s and later ===
Sleeping Nude aka Flesh Futon and Spring, Summer, Autumn Winter: Flesh Futon 肉布団; Niku futon	1971-01	Shinji Kubo; Kenji Miyase; Kumi Sugimura; Yuki Takami; Hiroko Fuji; Nashiko Shimae	Kokuei	71 min. Part color
Wet Play 濡れた遊戯; Nureta yūgi	1971-03		Million Film	70 min. B&W
Hymn of Roses あるモデルの生と死 薔薇の讃歌; Aru moderu no sei to shi: bara no sanka	1970-04		Kokuei	71 min. Part color
Deep Throat in Tokyo aka Tokyo Madame Deep Throat 東京ディープスロート夫人; Tōkyō diipu surōto fujin	1975-12-06	Kumi Taguchi; Hideo Murota; Tatsuya Nanjo; Tetsuya Chiba	Toei	77 min. Color
Snake and Lady Slave 蛇と女奴隷; Hebi to onnadorei	1976-10-16	Eiko Yanami; Junichirō Yamashita; Hideo Sunazuka	Mukai Productions / Universe Productions	65 min. Color
Forbidden Lady Bondage aka Forbidden Bound Wife 発禁縛り夫人; Hakkin shibari fujin	1978-01	Jirō Kokubu; Mako Kitano; Mami Sakura	Shintōhō Eiga	63 min. Color
Nun: Secret 修道女 －秘め事－ Shūdōjo: himegoto	1978-10	Mayuko Hino; Mako Kitano; Mariko Kitazawa	Universe Productions	62 min. Color
Savaged and Ravaged aka Secret Rape and Rape Injustice in Japan 日本密姦拷問史; Nippon mikkan gōmon-shi	1979-02	Yuriko Azuma; Tōru Ibuki; Akihiko Kanbara	Shintōhō Eiga	61 min. Color
Lady on 6th Street: Taste of Honey おんな６丁目 蜜の味; Onna 6-chōme: Mitsu no aji	1982-10-02	Junko Tamura; Yumika Nogawa; Natsuko Ishida	Shishi Productions	94 min. Color; Drama (non-pink)
Wet Kimono 四畳半色の濡衣; Yojōhan iro no nureginu	1983-03-12	Jun Miho; Osamu Murashima; Yuriko Hishimi	Toei Central Films	Mainstream drama 83 min. Color
Going West: To the West ＧＯＩＮＧ ＷＥＳＴ 西へ・・・ Going West: Nishi-e...	1997-10-18	Chikage Awashima; Mikio Ōzawa; Miki Fujitani	Mukai Productions	Mainstream film 99 min. Color

== Bibliography ==
=== English ===
- "HIROSHI MUKAI". Complete Index to World Film.
- Hiroshi Mukai (I) at IMDb
- "Pinku eiga: Beyond Pink; Blue Film Woman / Kan Mukai (with filmography & biography)". International Thessaloniki Film Festival. Archived from the original on 2011-07-21.
- Sharp, Jasper (2008). Behind the Pink Curtain: The Complete History of Japanese Sex Cinema. Guildford: FAB Press. ISBN 978-1-903254-54-7.
- Weisser, Thomas; Yuko Mihara Weisser (1998). "SPOTLIGHT: Heroes of the First Pink Wave; Hiroshi Mukai (Sometimes translated as Kan Mukai)". Japanese Cinema Encyclopedia: The Sex Films. Miami: Vital Books : Asian Cult Cinema Publications. p. 105. ISBN 1-889288-52-7.

=== Japanese ===
- 向井寛 (in Japanese). allcinema.net.
- 向井寛 (in Japanese). Directors Guild of Japan. Archived from the original on 2011-07-22.
- 向井寛 (in Japanese). Japanese Movie Database.
- 向井寛( 監督／脚本／企画／構成／製作 ) (in Japanese). Kinema Junpo. Archived from the original on 2011-10-07.
