= Atsushi Yamatoya =

Japanese filmmaker (1937–1993)

- 大和屋 竺
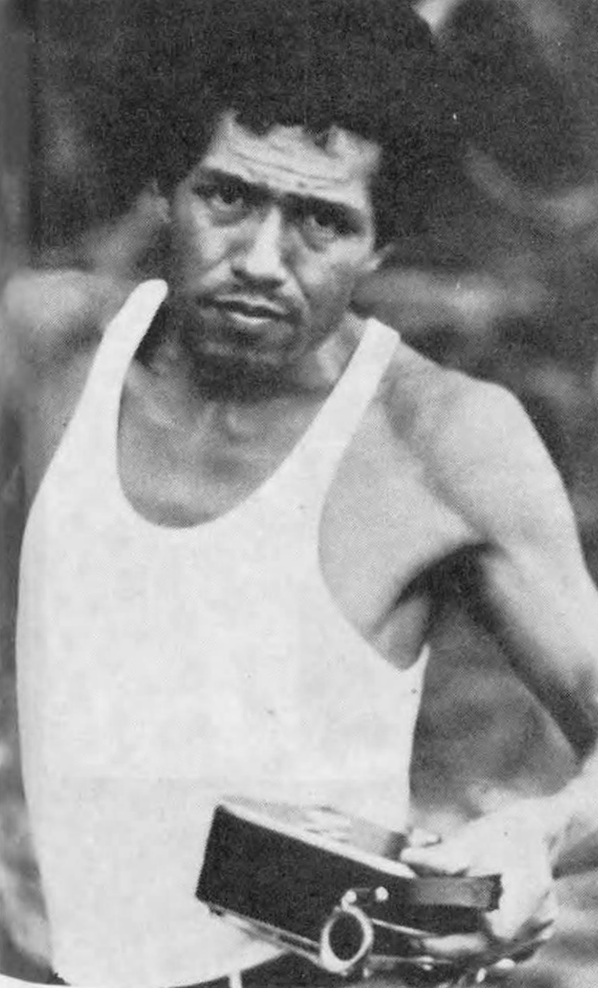
- Yamatoya in 1967
- Born: 19 June 1937; Mikasa, Hokkaido, Japan
- Died: 16 January 1993 (aged 55)
- Education: Waseda University
- Occupations: Film director, screenwriter, actor, singer, writer
- Years active: 1965-1992
- Children: Akatsuki Yamatoya (son)

Atsushi Yamatoya (大和屋 竺, Yamatoya Atsushi; 19 June 1937 – 16 January 1993) was a Japanese film director, screenwriter and actor. His son is a fellow screenwriter and race horse owner Akatsuki Yamatoya (大和屋 暁, Yamatoya Akatsuki).

== Life and career ==
Yamatoya was born in Horonaicho, Mikasa, Hokkaido and raised in Tokyo. He graduated from the First Department of Literature at Waseda University. While a student, he belonged to the "Waseda Alumni Scenario Research Society" with Yōzō Tanaka and others, and produced documentary films. In 1962, he joined the assistant director department at Nikkatsu (8th period). He left Nikkatsu in 1966, and in the same year released his first film, Season of Betrayal, produced by Koji Wakamatsu of Wakamatsu Productions. In 1966, he formed Guru Hachirō (具流 八郎), a group of screenwriters led by Seijun Suzuki, together with Takeo Kimura, Yōzō Tanaka, Chūsei Sone, Yutaka Okada, Seiichirō Yamaguchi, and Yasuaki Hangai.

Yamatoya proceeded to direct such films as Inflatable Sex Doll of the Wastelands in 1967 and Not Much More Than a Pistol in 1968. He is best known as the screenwriter for Seijun Suzuki's 1967 film Branded to Kill, which is "a stark, spastically existential—and, most affronting of all, defiantly unmarketable—crime-flick abstraction that unfolds like the director's cracked self-portrait."

Jasper Sharp, author of Behind the Pink Curtain: The Complete History of Japanese Sex Cinema, said, "Yamatoya is definitely very interesting." According to Roland Domenig, Yamatoya used his pink films for "formal experiments," while other directors such as Koji Wakamatsu and Masao Adachi used their pink films as "political propaganda."

Yamatoya died of esophageal cancer on 16 January 1993. In the same year, he posthumously received a special award at the 2nd Japan Film Professional Awards. After his death, Haruhiko Arai, Jūichirō Takeuchi, and Kenji Fukuma compiled the book, Give it to the Devil: Essays on the Cinema of Atsushi Yamatoya published by Wides Publishing.

== Filmography ==
=== As director ===
- Season of Betrayal (1966)
- Inflatable Sex Doll of the Wastelands (1967)
- The Pistol That Sprouted Hair (1968)
- Trapped in Lust (1973)

=== As screenwriter ===
- Branded to Kill (1967)
- Blue Film: Estimation (1968)
- Gewalt Gewalt (1969)
- Stray Cat Rock: Sex Hunter (1970)
- Secret Hot Spring Resort: Starfish at Night (1970)
- Wet Sand in August (1971)
- Scent of Eros in August (1972)
- Naked Seven (1972)
- Sweet Scent of Eros (1973)
- Bankaku Rock (1973)
- Barefoot in Blue Jeans (1975)
- Banned Book: Flesh Futon (1975)
- A Tale of Sorrow and Sadness (1977)
- Lupin the 3rd: The Mystery of Mamo (1978)
- Star of David: Beautiful Girl Hunter (1979)
- Haguregumo (1982)
- Matagi (1982)
- The Adventures of Gamba and His 7 Friends (1984)
- Locke the Superman (1984)
- Capone Cries a Lot (1985)
- Legend of the Gold of Babylon (1985)
- Toki no Tabibito: Time Stranger (1986)
- Dogra Magra (1988)

== Television ==
- Lupin the Third Part I (1971)
- Gamba no Bouken (1975)
- Hissatsu Karakurinin Keppūhen (1976)
- Ganso Tensai Bakabon (1976-1977)
- Shin Hissatsu Shiokinin (1977)
- Lupin the Third Part II (1977-1980)
- Nicho Kyofu Series (1979)
- Tantei Monogatari (1979)
- Ashita no Joe 2 (1980-1981)
- Pro Hunter (1981)
- The Monster Kid (1980-1982)
- Robot 8-chan (1982)
- Batten Robomaru (1983)
- Cat’s Eye (1983-1984)
- Perman (1983-1985)
- Lupin III Part III (1984-1985)
