= Kumi Taguchi (actress) =

Japanese actress of mixed ancestry

- Born: Constance Kumi Arnold; December 23, 1952 (age 72); North Carolina, United States
- Occupation: Actress

Kumi Taguchi (田口久美, Taguchi Kumi) is a Japanese actress of mixed ancestry who is best known for her roles in Nikkatsu's Roman porno series in the 1970s.

== Life and career ==
Taguchi, half Japanese and half American, was scouted by the film studio Toei while working in a beauty parlour, and soon afterwards appeared in a small part in Toei's 1975 film Wolf Guy: Burning Wolf Man directed by Kazuhiko Yamaguchi. That same year also marked her first starring role in Tokyo Emmanuelle for Nikkatsu where according to critic Jasper Sharp, her "figure and smouldering dark looks ... could be readily appreciated by viewers both in and outside Japan". There is a reference to Taguchi and the film in Chilean writer Antonio Skármeta 2003 novel The Dancer and the Thief where the lead character refers to a movie poster and remarks "A film with Kumi Taguchi, Mitsuyaso Mainu and Katsunori Hirose can't be all bad." She also starred in the film's sequel released by Nikkatsu in November 1975, Tokyo Emmanuelle: Private Instruction (東京エマニエル夫人 個人教授, Tōkyō emenueru fujin: kojin kyōju) directed by Katsuhiko Fujii.

At the end of 1975, Taguchi starred in another Japanese film which took its inspiration from a foreign sex movie, Deep Throat in Tokyo, directed by Kan Mukai and released by Toei. In early 1976, she joined fellow mixed-race performer Runa Takamura in director Masaru Konuma's Cloistered Nun: Runa's Confession for Nikkatsu. Later in 1976, she starred in two other Roman Pornos: Shōgorō Nishimura's A Call Girl's Testimony: Exposure and Katsuhiko Fujii's International Stewardess: Erotic Flight.

Taguchi also appeared in non-pink films for the Shochiku studio, the 1976 action film Utareru mae ni ute! (known internationally as Cobra) for director Umetsugu Inoue, and the 1977 thriller Edogawa Rampo's Perverted Beast directed by Tai Katō based on a novel by Japanese author Edogawa Rampo. In 1979 she had a small part in director Tōru Murakawa's suspense film Hakuchyu no shikaku.

Taguchi also had supporting roles in two television programs, the August 1978 horror thriller Kyodai kumo no kan (巨大蜘蛛の館) from TV Asahi, and episode 10 (Mask of the Night) of the cult detective series Tantei Monogatari broadcast by NTV in November 1979.

== Filmography ==
- Wolf Guy: Burning Wolf Man (ウルフガイ 燃えろ狼男, Urufugai moeru rōdan) (April 1975)
- Tokyo Emmanuelle (July 1975)
- Tokyo Emmanuelle: Private Instruction (東京エマニエル夫人 個人教授, Tōkyō emenueru fujin: kojin kyōju) (November 1975)
- Deep Throat in Tokyo (December 1975)
- Cloistered Nun: Runa's Confession (January 1976)
- A Call Girl's Testimony: Exposure (あるコールガールの証言 露出, Aru kōru gāru no shōgen: roshutsu) (June 1976)
- Utareru mae ni ute! (撃たれる前に撃て！)
- International Stewardess: Erotic Flight (国際線スチュワーデス 官能飛行, Kokusai-sen suchuwādesu: kannō hikō) (September 1976)
- Edogawa Rampo's Perverted Beast (江戸川乱歩の陰獣, Edogawa Rampo no injū) (June 1977)
- Japanese Don: Conclusion (日本の首領 完結篇, Nihon no don: kanketsuhen) (September 1978)
- Hakuchyu no shikaku (白昼の死角) (April 1979)
