= Blue Film Woman =

- Theatrical poster
- Directed by: Kan Mukai
- Written by: Yutaka Sō
- Produced by: Daisuke Asakura; Minoru Suzuki; Keiko Satō
- Starring: Mitsugu Fujii
- Cinematography: Masayuki Hamano
- Edited by: Akira Shimura
- Music by: Takashi Akutagawa
- Distributed by: Kokuei
- Release date: January 1, 1969 (Japan)
- Running time: 80 minutes
- Country: Japan
- Language: Japanese

Blue Film Woman (Japanese: ブルーフィルムの女, Hepburn: Burū firumu no onna) is a 1969 Japanese pink film directed by Kan Mukai.

== Synopsis ==
As his investments in the stock market fail, a man finds himself in serious debt to a lecherous loan-shark named Uchiyama. The man's wife hires herself to Uchiyama to buy time for the husband to pay off the debt. After Uchiyama uses the wife to provide companionship for his mentally-impaired son, she is hit by a car, and her husband falls into despair and illness. Their daughter works as a nightclub dancer, intending to save the money to help with the debt. After her father's suicide, the girl decides to get revenge.

== Cast ==
- Mitsugu Fujii
- Ichirō Furuoka
- Miki Hashimoto
- Keisuke Kawahigashi
- Rika Koyanagi
- Reo Mizumori
- Kumi Ōsugi
- Shūsuke Sone
- Takako Uchida

== Production ==
Because 3.5 million yen was the budget imposed on works in the pink film genre, an all-color production had been beyond the means of directors in the 1960s. Some films had been shot partially in color, using color only for certain scenes, a practice that would continue until Nikkatsu took over the genre with its Roman porno series in 1971. Blue Film Woman was one of the first all-color pink films. Jasper Sharp writes that director Mukai's use of color in this film appears to be "making up for lost time, exploding into its super-saturated hues from the very first frame... flooded with prismatic blotches of primary reds and blues and silhouettes of naked female bodies - not unlike a more lysergically-inspired version of a Bond movie credit sequence." The style continues, Sharp writing that the film as a whole is a "highly stylised piece."

== Release ==
Blue Film Woman is one of the only pink films from its era to survive in a 35mm format. It made its U.S. debut in September 2008, with a new print screened at the Fantastic Fest in Austin, Texas. After the viewing, twitchfilm.net judged that it is, "a great example of early pinku eiga that deserves to be seen." Its Canadian debut was at the FanTasia International Film Festival. It was shown at the fiftieth International Thessaloniki Film Festival.

== Bibliography ==
=== English ===
- "Blue Film Woman". www.fantasiafestival.com. Archived from the original on 2009-07-17.
- Burû firumu no onna (1969) at IMDb
- Perkins, Rodney (2008-09-23). "BEHIND THE PINK CURTAIN Retrospective: Kan Mukai's BLUE FILM WOMAN". twitchfilm.net. Archived from the original on 2009-03-17.
- Sharp, Jasper (2008). Behind the Pink Curtain: The Complete History of Japanese Sex Cinema. Guildford: FAB Press. pp. 62, 218, 351. ISBN 978-1-903254-54-7.

=== Japanese ===
- ブルーフィルムの女(1969) (in Japanese). allcinema.net.
- ブルーフィルムの女 (in Japanese). Japanese Movie Database.
