= Luna Takamura =

- Born: September 18, 1952; Kobe, Japan
- Origin: Japan
- Died: March 6, 2004 (aged 51) Honolulu, Hawaii, US
- Genre: J-pop
- Occupations: Singer-songwriter, actress
- Instrument: Vocals
- Years active: 1970–2004
- Formerly of: Golden Half

Luna Takamura or Runa Takamura (高村ルナ, Takamura Runa) (September 18, 1952, in Kobe – March 6, 2004, in Honolulu) was a J-pop singer, actress and dancer of Japanese and German descent. Later in her career, she became particularly known for her two Nikkatsu Roman Porno films released in 1976.

== Music career ==
Takamura had been a member of Golden Half until the band's split in 1974. Like the rest of the members, she was hāfu, being of mixed Japanese and German descent. However, she preferred to be labeled as an ainoko, stating, "Hāfu feels halfway, half done. I don’t like that.”

She released a solo album titled Tenshi no Asa (天使の朝) from Nippon Crown in 1975.

== Film career ==
In 1976, Takamura played the title role in Masaru Konuma's nunsploitation film Cloistered Nun: Runa's Confession. She followed this film with Kōyū Ohara's Runa's Confession: "Men Crawling All Over Me" a semi-autobiographical, erotic retelling of her pop music career.

== Filmography ==
Based on:

- Stray Cat Rock: Sex Hunter (野良猫ロック セックスハンター, Nora-neko rokku: Sekkusu hanta), 1970, cameo as a Golden Half member.
- ESPY (エスパイ, Esupai), 1974, Judy.
- Cloistered Nun: Runa's Confession (修道女ルナの告白, Shudojo Runa no kokuhaku), 1976, Runa/Luna.
- Runa's Confession: "Men Crawling All Over Me" (ルナの告白 私に群がった男たち, Runa no kokuhaku: Watashi ni muraga tta otoko tachi), 1976, herself.
- Assault! Jack the Ripper (暴行切り裂きジャック, Bōkō Kirisaki Jakku), 1976, woman at the boutique.
- New Female Prisoner Scorpion #701 (新女囚さそり ７０１号, Shin joshuu sasori: 701-gō), 1976, a performer.
