= Yoma Komatsu =

Japanese pop singer (born 1974)

- Also known as: ΨΦΜΑ ΚΦΜΑΤSU, YOMA
- Born: Nao Komatsu; December 30, 1974 (age 51); Tokyo, Japan
- Genres: Japanese Pop; Trance; Eurobeat; Techno
- Occupation: Singer
- Years active: 2000–present
- Labels: Konami; avex; Toshiba-EMI

Yoma Komatsu (小松 代真, Komatsu Yoma; born December 30, 1974) is a Japanese pop singer. She is the eldest member of the Konami-produced J-pop group BeForU.

== Biography ==
=== Early life ===
Komatsu was born in Tokyo, Japan on December 30, 1974.

=== Career ===
Komatsu has released four songs as a solo artist, Dance Dance Revolution's "Ever Snow", Eternal on the album BeForU II, Izayoi on BeForU III and on 6Notes she sang "フレンズ" [Furenzu/Friends].

Her solo work was signed with some capitalized Greek letters as: ΨΦΜΑ ΚΦΜΑΤSU.

== Discography ==
=== 6Notes ===
- フレンズ (as 代真[Yoma])

=== beatmaniaIIDX 11 IIDX RED Original Soundtrack ===
- KI・SE・KI (IIDX RED EDIT) (with BeForU)

=== beatmaniaIIDX 12 HAPPY SKY ORIGINAL SOUNDTRACK ===
- We are Disっ娘よっつ打ち命 (with 外花りさ, O.L., ANNIE)
- We are Disっ娘よっつ打ち命(original size) (外花りさ, O.L., ANNIE)

=== BeForU ===
- チカラ (LIVE BAND style) (with BeForU)
- DIVE (with BeForU)
- BRE∀K DOWN! (LIVE BAND style) (with BeForU)
- Firefly (with BeForU)
- GRADUATION～それぞれの明日～ (unplugged version) (with BeForU)

=== BeForU II ===
- KI・SE・KI(album version) (with BeForU)
- Morning Glory (with BeForU)
- Eternal
- BLACK OUT～I want to be・・・!! (album version) (with BeForU)
- PEACE(^^)v (with BeForU)
- DIVE2006 (with BeForU)

=== BeForU FIRST LIVE at ZeppTokyo 2006 ===
- KI・SE・KI (with BeForU)
- DIVE2006 (with BeForU)
- Firefly (with BeForU)
- ETERNAL
- チ・カ・ラ (with りゆ& のりあ)
- 約束 (with BeForU)
- BLACK OUT～I want to be・・・!! (with BeForU)
- BRE∀K DOWN! (with BeForU)
- PEACE(^^)v (with BeForU)
- GRADUATION ～それぞれの明日～ (with BeForU)

=== (Dance Dance Revolution 5th Mix) Original Soundtrack ===
- DIVE (with BeForU)

=== Dance Dance Revolution 6th Mix (DDRMAX) Original Soundtrack ===
- DIVE ~more deep & deeper style~ (with BeForU)
- Firefly (with BeForU)

=== Dance Dance Revolution 7th Mix (DDRMAX2) Original Soundtrack ===
- BRE∀K DOWN ! (with BeForU)
- ever snow

=== Dance Dance Revolution EXTREME Original Soundtrack ===
- GRADUATION ～それぞれの明日～ (with BeForU)
- GRADUATION ～それぞれの明日～ (FULL VERSION)
- STAFF ROLL (with BeForU)

=== Dance Dance Revolution Party Collection Original Soundtrack ===
- Freedom (with BeForU)

=== Dance Dance Revolution FESTIVAL and STRIKE ORIGINAL SOUNDTRACK ===
- KI・SE・KI (DDR edit) (with BeForU)

=== Dance Dance Revolution SuperNOVA ===
- Morning Glory (with BeForU)
- PEACE(^^)v (with BeForU)

=== Get set GO!! ～BeForU astronauts set～ ===
- Get set GO!! (with BeForU)
- Red Rocket Rising English edit. (with BeForU)

=== GUITARFREAKS 8thMIX and drummania 7thMIX Original Soundtrack ===
- BRE∀K DOWN! -GF&DM STYLE- (with BeForU)

=== GUITARFREAKS 9thMIX and drummania 8thMIX Original Soundtrack ===
- チカラ (with BeForU)

=== GuitarFreaksV2 ＆ DrumManiaV2 ===
- BLACK OUT (with BeForU)

=== GUITARFREAKS and drummania BEST TRACKS ===
- BRE∀K DOWN! (Full Version) (with BeForU)

=== KI・SE・KI ===
- KI・SE・KI (with BeForU)
- チカラ (Re-arranged version) (with BeForU)
- Firefly (add Vocal&Mix)(with BeForU)
- 約束 (with BeForU)

=== pop'n music 12 いろは AC ♥ CS pop'n music 10 ===
- GRADUATION ～それぞれの明日～ (from Dance Dance Revolution EXTREME) (with BeForU)

=== Red Rocket Rising ===
- Red Rocket Rising (with BeForU)

=== Strike Party!!! ===
- 01. Strike Party!!! (With BeForU)
- 02. BALA≠BALA (with BeForU)

=== We Love We 'We Love Winning Eleven' ===
- Step by Step (with BeForU and イジワルケイFC)

=== 夜花火 ===
- 夜花火 [ Yo Hanabi Night Fireworks] (with BeForU)
- ムーンバイク [Muunbaiku Moonbike] (with BeForU)

== Filmography ==
- Hounddog 2 – Lewellen's Neighbor
