= Tora-san, the Intellectual =

- Theatrical poster
- Directed by: Yoji Yamada
- Written by: Yoji Yamada; Yoshitaka Asama
- Starring: Kiyoshi Atsumi; Fumie Kashiyama
- Cinematography: Tetsuo Takaba
- Edited by: Iwao Ishii
- Music by: Naozumi Yamamoto
- Distributed by: Shochiku
- Release date: December 27, 1975
- Running time: 100 minutes
- Country: Japan
- Language: Japanese

Tora-san, the Intellectual (男はつらいよ 葛飾立志篇, Otoko wa Tsurai yo: Katsushika Risshihen) aka Tora-san Meets a Lady Scholar is a 1975 Japanese comedy film directed by Yoji Yamada. It stars Kiyoshi Atsumi as Torajirō Kuruma (Tora-san), and Fumie Kashiyama as his love interest or "Madonna". Tora-san, the Intellectual is the sixteenth entry in the popular, long-running Otoko wa Tsurai yo series.

== Synopsis ==
Tora-san returns to his family's shop in Shibamata, Tokyo to find himself accused of being the father of a 17-year-old girl. It turns out that Tora-san had only given help to the girl's mother after her husband had left her. Tora-san becomes infatuated with the female archeology student who is staying with his family, and attempts to take up intellectual pursuits to get near her.

== Cast ==
- Kiyoshi Atsumi as Torajirō
- Chieko Baisho as Sakura
- Fumie Kashiyama as Reiko
- Junko Sakurada as Junko Mogami
- Keiju Kobayashi as Professor Tadokoro
- Masami Shimojō as Tatsuzō Kuruma (Torajiro's uncle)
- Chieko Misaki as Tsune Kuruma (Torajiro's aunt)
- Gin Maeda as Hiroshi Suwa
- Hayato Nakamura as Mitsuo Suwa
- Hisao Dazai as Boss (Umetarō Katsura)
- Gajirō Satō as Genkō
- Chishū Ryū as Gozen-sama

== Critical appraisal ==
A 1977 review in The New York Times judged Tora-san, the Intellectual to be "genuinely warm and charming". The review commented that Yoji Yamada's script was "convoluted" and the directing "uneven", but that "Mr. Yamada is decidedly professional in shaping a colorful and briskly moving story," and that the film as a whole "project[s] contemporary Japanese family life and ties realistically and affectionately." The German-language site molodezhnaja gives Tora-san, the Intellectual three and a half out of five stars.

== Availability ==
Tora-san, the Intellectual was released theatrically on December 27, 1975. In Japan, the film was released on videotape in 1996, and in DVD format in 2005 and 2008. The film played for two days in New York in 1977 during which time it received a review in The New York Times.

== Bibliography ==
=== English ===
- "OTOKO WA TSURAI YO KATSUSHIKA RISSHI-HEN (1975)". British Film Institute. Archived from the original on 2012-10-17.
- "OTOKO WA TSURAIYO -KATSUSHIKA RISSHI-HEN". Complete Index to World Film.
- Otoko wa tsurai yo: Katsushika risshihen (1975) at IMDb
- Weiler, A.H. (1977-04-27). "Film: Japanese Suds". The New York Times.

=== German ===
- "Tora-San, the Intellectual" (in German). www.molodezhnaja.ch.

=== Japanese ===
- 男はつらいよ 葛飾立志篇 (1975) (in Japanese). allcinema.net.
- "男はつらいよ 葛飾立志篇". Japanese Cinema Database (Agency for Cultural Affairs). Archived from the original on 2012-02-26.
- 男はつらいよ 葛飾立志篇 (in Japanese). Japanese Movie Database.
- 男はつらいよ 葛飾立志篇 (in Japanese). Kinema Junpo. Archived from the original on 2012-03-09.
