= Banned Book: Flesh Futon =

1975 film

- Theatrical poster
- Directed by: Nobuaki Shirai
- Written by: Atsushi Yamatoya
- Produced by: Ryōji Itō
- Starring: Hajime Tanimoto; Terumi Azuma
- Cinematography: Toshirō Yamasaki
- Edited by: Atsushi Nabeshima
- Music by: Hajime Kaburagi
- Distributed by: Nikkatsu
- Release date: November 22, 1975
- Running time: 72 min.
- Country: Japan
- Language: Japanese

Banned Book: Flesh Futon (発禁 肉蒲団, Hakkin nikubuton) is a 1975 Japanese film in Nikkatsu's Roman Porno series, directed by Nobuaki Shirai and starring Hajime Tanimoto and Terumi Azuma.

The film is based on a 17th-century Chinese erotic novel by Li Yu best known as The Carnal Prayer Mat.

== Synopsis ==
Mio, a struggling writer, authors a pornographic book entitled Flesh Futon, which unexpectedly becomes a bestseller. With newfound wealth, Mio immerses himself in the nightlife, justifying his actions to his wife as research. However, Mio's reputation takes a nosedive when a prostitute describes his penis as resembling a "guppy." Misfortune continues to plague him; his book gets banned, and his wife tightens her control. In the midst of his woes, Mio's house is robbed. Surprisingly, the thief is none other than the Japanese folk-hero Nezumi Kozō. The two forge an unlikely friendship, and Kozō introduces Mio to a doctor who can perform penis-enlargement surgery. Armed with his enhanced appendage, Kozō and Mio become regulars in the red-light district, until the real Nezumi Kozō surfaces, ushering in a return of misfortune for Mio.

== Cast ==
- Hajime Tanimoto: Mio Kingyotei
- Maya Hiromi: Shungiku
- Rei Okamoto: O-ine
- Terumi Azuma: Nui
- Akemi Nijō: Tama Kishibe
- Tamaki Katsura: Kō Iwanabe
- Asuka Seri: Kayo
- Hiromi Igarashi: Bikuni
- Nobutaka Masutoko: Jirokichi Nezumi Kozō

== Reception ==
In their Japanese Cinema Encyclopedia: The Sex Films, the Weissers write that Atsumi Yamatoya's script for Banned Book: Flesh Futon shifts awkwardly between sex jokes and slapstick, and that it is "wildly out of control" by the time that Mio meets the first Nezumi Kozō. By the time the real Kozō appears, the story has gone completely over-the-top. Allmovie agrees that the slapstick humor is too much, but points out that this comedy at least proves that Nikkatsu was producing more than S&M and erotic melodrama films during the 1970s.

== Release ==
Banned Book: Flesh Futon was released theatrically in Japan on November 22, 1975.

== Home media ==
It was released on home video in VHS format in Japan on August 16, 1983, and re-released on August 4, 1995.

== Bibliography ==
=== English ===
- "HAKKIN NIKUBUTON". Complete Index to World Film.
- Hakkin nikubuton (1975) at IMDb
- Weisser, Thomas; Yuko Mihara Weisser (1998). Japanese Cinema Encyclopedia: The Sex Films. Miami: Vital Books : Asian Cult Cinema Publications. ISBN 1-889288-52-7.

=== Japanese ===
- 発禁 肉蒲団(1975) (in Japanese). allcinema.net.
- 発禁肉蒲団 (in Japanese). Japanese Cinema Database (Agency for Cultural Affairs). Archived from the original on 2011-10-08.
- 発禁 肉蒲団 (in Japanese). Japanese Movie Database.
- 発禁肉蒲団(邦画) (in Japanese). Kinema Junpo. Archived from the original on 2011-10-07.
- 発禁・肉蒲団 (in Japanese). www.nikkatsu-romanporno.com. Archived from the original on 2011-07-22.
