= Hans Christian Andersen's The Little Mermaid (1975 film) =

- Japanese theatrical release poster
- Directed by: Tomoharu Katsumata
- Written by: Mieko Osanai; Ikuko Ōyabu
- Based on: The Little Mermaid by Hans Christian Andersen
- Produced by: Ken Ariga Yoshio Takami
- Starring: Fumie Kashiyama; Mariko Miyagi; Taro Shigaki
- Cinematography: Shigeyoshi Ikeda; Yoshihiro Yamada; Henning Kristiansen
- Edited by: Yutaka Chikura
- Music by: Takekuni Hirayoshi
- Animation by: Reyko Okuyama
- Production company: Toei Animation
- Distributed by: Toei Company
- Release date: 21 March 1975
- Running time: 68 minutes
- Country: Japan
- Language: Japanese

Hans Christian Andersen's The Little Mermaid (アンデルセン童話 人魚姫, Anderusen Dōwa: Ningyo-hime; lit. 'Andersen's Fairy Tales: Princess Mermaid') is a 1975 Japanese anime film directed by Tomoharu Katsumata, based on Hans Christian Andersen's 1837 fairy tale The Little Mermaid. Animated by Toei Animation, this film is close to Andersen's story, notably in its preservation of the original and tragic ending. The two main protagonists are the youngest daughter of the royal family, Marina, and her best friend Fritz, an Atlantic dolphin calf. In Japan, the film was shown in the Toei Manga Matsuri (Toei Cartoon Festival) on 21 March 1975.

The film was later released in the United States, dubbed into English by G.G. Communications, Inc. and Prima Film, Inc., in 1979, under the title Hans Christian Anderson's The Little Mermaid. Andersen's name would be correctly spelled in subsequent releases.

== Plot ==
Hans Christian Andersen's The Little Mermaid opens in live-action Denmark. The narrator mentions Hans Christian Andersen, who is from there, and his original story. The scene then dissolves to 2-D hand-drawn anime.

Princess Marina, who lives in the undersea kingdom with her father, grandmother and five older sisters, plays with her best friend Fritz, a dolphin, before getting caught in a storm conjured by the Sea Witch. Once home, she is scolded by her sisters for being late, reminding her that their grandmother will not give her the pearl hairpin that signifies adulthood unless she is responsible. The following day, Marina's sisters go to the surface. Marina is forbidden to go because she has not yet come of age. While exploring a sunken ship, Marina discovers a statue of a human prince. She and Fritz sneak to the surface, where she sees the same prince on a ship.

Another storm arises and throws the prince into the sea. Marina saves him and brings him to shore, leaving him there to be found. A raven-haired girl finds the prince and cares for him. Because of her rescue of a human, Marina's grandmother decides that she is ready to come of age, and Marina receives her pearl hairpin.

Determined to see the prince again and gain an immortal soul, Marina visits the Sea Witch, who gives her a potion that will make her human, although in exchange, she must give the Sea Witch her beautiful voice and will never be able to become a mermaid again. The Sea Witch warns her that if the prince marries another, she will die and dissolve into sea foam at sunrise the next morning after the wedding. After a heartfelt goodbye to her family and Fritz, Marina drinks the potion and is transformed.

She is discovered by the prince on the shore and lives with him for a month. The two become close and the prince tells her that his parents want him to marry a foreign princess but he wants to marry the girl who saved his life. Since he cannot find her, he wishes to marry Marina. The prince's jealous cat, Jemmy, who vows to get rid of Marina, reports the conversation to the prince's parents, and the queen suspects that Marina has bewitched her son. When the foreign princess arrives, the prince's father orders Marina to be arrested for treason. The prince recognizes the foreign princess as the same raven-haired girl who had supposedly saved him. They are soon to be married.

Heartbroken, Marina summons Fritz so that she can say goodbye, but Fritz vows to find a way to save her. Marina's sisters, having given their hair to the Sea Witch in exchange for a magic dagger, give her the dagger. They tell her that if she stabs the prince through the heart and lets his blood drip onto her feet, she will become a mermaid again. With dawn only minutes away, Marina sneaks into the prince's room but cannot bring herself to kill him. She kisses him goodbye as he sleeps.

As she throws the dagger into the sea, the reflection wakes the prince. He rushes onto the deck, calling after her, but she jumps. As he calls her name, he sees that she has left behind her pearl hairpin and a scale from her tail. As the sun rises, Marina's body turns to foam and ascends into the sky. The prince realizes that Marina was the real girl who saved his life, and he and Fritz grieve her death. Marina's spirit lives on in heaven for her self-sacrifice.

Hans Christian Andersen's The Little Mermaid fades back to live-action in Denmark. The narrator expresses belief that the Little Mermaid's soul has become one with the sea and that her courage will forever live on. The film ends on a still shot of the Little Mermaid statue in Copenhagen.

== Main characters ==
Princess Marina (マリーナ姫, Marīna Hime)
Marina, 14 years old, is a princess of the undersea kingdom and the youngest of six daughters. She is a blonde, sweet and beautiful mermaid and is known for having the most beautiful voice in the kingdom. She is curious about the human world and likes collecting items that come from the surface. She falls in love with a human prince and sacrifices her beautiful voice in order to be with him.
Fritz (フリッツ, Furittsu)
Fritz is a blue Atlantic dolphin calf and Marina's best friend.
Prince Fjord (フィヨルド王子, Fiyorudo Ōji)
Brave and well-trained in the military arts, the Prince dislikes the idea of an arranged marriage. After surviving a shipwreck, he becomes obsessed with finding the girl who saved his life.
The Sea Witch (魔女, Majo)
Unlike in other versions of the story, the Sea Witch is not evil, but she is shrewd. She has no specific interest in harming anyone, but can be very destructive in creating storms that sink ships. She is a gigantic devil ray.
The Princess of Suomi (スオミの姫, Suomi no Hime)
The raven-haired princess of the Kingdom of Finland, she is the girl who finds the prince on the shore after Marina brings him to land, subsequently making him think that she was the one who saved him.
Jemmy (ジェミー, Jemī)
Despite being the Prince's loyal cat, Jemmy tries to get rid of Marina, first by killing her and then by accusing her of manipulating the prince.

== Voice cast ==
Character	Original	English
Princess Marina	Fumie Kashiyama; Kumiko Ōsugi (singing voice)	Kirsten Bishopric
Fritz	Mariko Miyagi	Thor Bishopric
Prince Fjord	Taro Shigaki	Ian Finlay
Duke	Kosei Tomita	Neil Shee
The Merman King	Hidekatsu Shibata	Neil Shee
Yellow fish	Ichirō Nagai	Unknown
The Sea Witch	Haruko Kitahama	Jane Woods
Jemmy	Kazuko Sawada	Jane Woods
The Princess of Suomi	Rihoko Yokota	Jane Woods
Marina's Sisters	Kazuko Sugiyama	Jeannette Casenave
Marina's Sisters	Haruko Kitahama	Jane Woods
The Prince's Mother	Nana Yamaguchi	Jane Woods
Marina's Grandmother	Miyoko Asō	Jeannette Casenave

=== Additional English voices ===
- Jeannette Casenave
- Terry Haig
- Neil Shee

== Production ==
Hans Christian Andersen's The Little Mermaid was produced as a commemorative tribute marking the 100th anniversary of the death of Hans Christian Andersen, and was based on his representative work The Little Mermaid. Although Toei had previously released an animated film based on Andersen in March 1968, The World of Hans Christian Andersen, that work incorporated Andersen's tales within a broader narrative framework; therefore, this film was the studio's first feature-length adaptation of a single Andersen story.

In adapting the story for animation, the originally unnamed "Little Mermaid" and "Prince" were given the names Marina and Fjord, respectively. An original character, a dolphin named Fritz, was also added. The plot follows Andersen's original work quite closely, although the protagonist's search for a human soul is not mentioned; instead, it focuses mainly on her love for the prince. Therefore, although the original ending was retained, her transformation into a daughter of the air was omitted. Location filming was conducted in Denmark, and live-action footage was incorporated into both the film's opening and ending sequences.

Actress Fumie Kashiyama was cast as the voice of Marina, while actor Taro Shigaki voiced Fjord. The role of Fritz was performed by Mariko Miyagi, marking her return to voice acting in a Toei animated film since The White Snake Enchantress (1958). The voice of Marina's sister was provided by Kazuko Sugiyama, who had previously starred in Toei Animation's television series Mahō no Mako-chan, an anime series inspired by The Little Mermaid.

In 1974, the year prior to the film's release, Toei Animation's presidency passed from Junichi Toishi to Tomonori Imada; this film was the first to credit Imada as producer. He subsequently remained involved in numerous Toei theatrical animation projects until becoming chairman of the company in 1993. Conversely, Reiko Okuyama, the first woman to serve as animation director on a Toei animated feature, left the company following this production.

The film was designated as a cooperating work for Expo '75 and was selected by the Ministry of Education, recommended by the Central Child Welfare Council of the Ministry of Health, Labour and Welfare and the Japan Juvenile Writers Association, and endorsed by the Governor of Tokyo.

== Music ==
In March 1975, Nippon Columbia released a record featuring the film's two songs, while in the same year Asahi Sonorama issued a flexi disc that included both the songs and a dramatized version of the story.

Opening theme
"Yearning" (あこがれ, Akogare)
Sung by Kumiko Ōsugi, lyrics by Tokiko Iwatani, music and arrangement by Takekuni Hirayoshi.
Inserted song
"The One I've Waited For" (待っていた人, Matteita Hito); "When a Mermaid Comes of Age" (Marina's Song) in the English version.
Sung by Kumiko Ōsugi and People, lyrics by Tokiko Iwatani, music and arrangement by Takekuni Hirayoshi.

== Release ==
Hans Christian Andersen's The Little Mermaid was released in Japan on 21 March 1975 by Toei Company as part of the Toei Manga Matsuri program. Other films screened alongside it were Great Mazinger vs. Getter Robo, Kore ga UFO da! Sora Tobu Enban, Kamen Rider Amazon, Ganbare!! Robocon, and Majokko Megu-chan: Tsuki yori no Shisha. It earned distribution revenue of ¥363 million.

=== English release ===
The film's English dub was produced by G.G. Communications, Inc. and Prima Film, Inc. It was recorded in Canada by Cinelume and directed by Tim Reid. The English dub debuted on VHS and Betamax on 1 August 1978, distributed by Video Gems under the title Hans Christian Anderson's The Little Mermaid. G.G. Communications later gave it a theatrical release in January 1979 under the same title. Only the insert song was dubbed into English, while the opening theme song remained instrumental.

=== Release titles ===
- Andersen dôwa ningyo hime (Japan) (alternative transliteration)
- Hans Christian Anderson's The Little Mermaid (USA) (theatrical title)
- Hans Christian Andersen's The Little Mermaid (USA) (video box title)
- The Little Mermaid (international: English title)

== Home media releases ==
In Japan, Hans Christian Andersen's The Little Mermaid was released on LaserDisc by Toei Video on 21 September 1996. It was later included in the DVD release Fukkoku! Toei Manga Matsuri 1975-nen Haru, released on 21 November 2011.

The English dub of the film was originally released on VHS and Betamax by Video Gems on 1 August 1978, followed by another release by Children's Video Library in 1984; both releases remove the Toei logo at the beginning of the film. The film was later re-released on VHS by Starmaker Entertainment in 1989; it was sold as a full version of the original film under the title Hans Christian Andersen's The Little Mermaid. The film was released on Region 1 (USA and Canada) DVD by UAV Corporation under the title "The Little Mermaid: Based on Hans Christian Andersen's Classic Tale". The cover art differs significantly from the film's original character design. The film is now licensed by Discotek Media, which released the full, uncut film on Region 1 DVD, making it the first time that the full film has been available in the U.S. since the original VHS release. The DVD includes the original Japanese audio with English subtitles and the English dub, and presents the film in its original aspect ratio. The film was released on Blu-ray on 26 March 2024.

== Reception ==
Hans Christian Andersen's The Little Mermaid received the Grand Prix in the Animation Category at the Giffoni Film Festival and won the Pioneer Fairy Tale Award at the Moscow International Film Festival.

== Legacy ==
Comedy podcast RiffTrax (Michael J. Nelson, Bill Corbett and Kevin Murphy) recorded and released a riff of the film in 2024.
