= Karayuki-san, the Making of a Prostitute =

1973 film by Shōhei Imamura

- Directed by: Shōhei Imamura
- Produced by: Akira Ogawa
- Narrated by: Shōhei Imamura
- Cinematography: Masao Tochizawa
- Release date: 1973
- Running time: 75 minutes
- Languages: Japanese, Malaysian

Karayuki-san, the Making of a Prostitute (からゆきさん) is a 1973 Japanese television documentary film by director Shōhei Imamura. It tells the story of a karayuki-san, a term for Japanese women who were sent to foreign Asian countries to serve as prostitutes. Imamura interviews a 73-year-old woman who was sent to Malaysia and forced into prostitution.

== Plot ==
From the late 1800s to the early 1900s, tens of thousands of young Japanese women were smuggled overseas, as the money they earned promised additional tax incomes for the government. Imamura interviews a 73-year-old woman, Kikuyo Zendo, a former karayuki-san living with her in-laws in Malaysia. She gives a straightforward testimony of her sexual slavery and wartime experiences.

Kikuyo was born the youngest child of 8 into a family that worked as farmers and merchants in Toyota District, Hiroshima. After the parents' early deaths, she was first looked after by her brother and later lived with an older sister. At the age of 19, she was tricked into leaving Japan with a friend and ended up in Kelang, Malaysia, where she was forced into prostitution on the ground that she had to earn back the cost of her passage and food. After three years, she was able to pay back her debts and moved to Changi, Singapore. In Singapore, Kikuyo worked in a restaurant and offered her sexual services in a room above the restaurant or by visiting ships in the harbour, before moving to Ipoh, loathing the often violent shipwright customers. About the same time, prostitution in Asian countries with Japanese communities was outlawed by the Japanese government for being "indecent". Kikuyo first married a Japanese photographer, but left him after he quit his job to move to Singapore, and then an Indian railway worker. During the Pacific War, Kikuyo was interred in an Indian prison camp like other fellow Japanese, but unlike the majority of the inmates from Amakusa and Shimabara, she did not share their patriotism and neither cared if Japan would win or lose the war. Asked by Imamura if she would like to return to her home country, she replies that she would have liked to pay a visit once, but cannot afford it.

Curious about her hometown, Imamura visits the village where Kikuyo was born. He discovers that many of its inhabitants, including her family, were burakumin and faced with discrimination. Imamura contemplates if this is the reason for Kikuyo's detachment from her country. In Tokyo, he visits Mrs. Ishimura, wife of the former head of a company branch in Malaysia and Kikuyo's employer for 6 months. From Mrs. Ishimura he learns that Kikuyo, contrary to her modest on-camera statements, is very unhappy with living at the home of her son's mother-in-law, who only tolerates her because she is a hard labourer.

Back in Malaysia, Imamura locates some other former karayuki-san, who continue living in the same area as Kikuyo and tell of their fates and those of other young women, some of whom disappeared or committed suicide in their despair. Kikuyo then takes him to visit a cemetery which has many graves of karayuki-san. Some of the deceased lie in graves under memorial stones, others are buried in unmarked graves or ones marked either with numbered stones without names, or simple wooden posts.

The film ends with Kikuyo's visit to Japan in May 1973, made possible with the help of the Buraku Liberation League and the encouragement of Mrs. Ishimura and representatives of Kikuyo's home town. Imamura closes with the words that "this is not a simple moving story", but Kikuyo's chance to see with her own eyes if her home country has changed or not.

== Reception ==
Joan Mellen, in The Waves at Genji's Door, called this film, "Perhaps the most brilliant and feeling of Imamura's fine documentaries."
