= Tokyo Emmanuelle =

- Theatrical poster
- Directed by: Akira Katō
- Written by: Kenshō Nakano
- Produced by: Kei Ijichi
- Starring: Kumi Taguchi
- Cinematography: Shinsaku Himeda
- Edited by: Shinji Yamada
- Music by: Eddie Han and the Oriental Express
- Distributed by: Nikkatsu
- Release date: July 1, 1975
- Running time: 70 min.
- Country: Japan
- Language: Japanese

Tokyo Emmanuelle (東京エマニエル夫人, Tōkyō Emanieru fujin), released in the UK as Emmanuelle in Tokyo, is a 1975 Japanese film in Nikkatsu's Roman porno series, directed by Akira Katō and starring Kumi Taguchi.

== Plot ==
After the director's message, "I visualize the romance of Roman Porn and I attempt to share that image," a loosely connected series of softcore sex scenes unfolds. The plot concerns Kyoko (Kumi Taguchi), a young Japanese woman married to a man in France. When he abandons her, she returns to Japan. With her sexual appetite now at a high pitch, she engages in sexual escapades with a wide assortment of people, including old friends, both male and female, and an entire soccer team.

== Cast ==
- Kumi Taguchi as Kyoko
- Fujio Murakami
- Naka Fuyuki
- Mitsuko Aoi
- Namio Sokame
- Mitsuyasu Maeno

== Background ==
Director Akira Katō was a competent, but not highly successful member of the Nikkatsu Roman Porno team. His Crazy for Love (1971) was part of Nikkatsu's second Roman Porno double-release, and he stayed with the studio throughout its 17-year production of the series. Tokyo Emmanuelle was Katō's first successful film. Later well-regarded films by the director include Slave Wife (1976) and Momoe's Lips: Love Beast (1980).

== Critical appraisal ==
In a contemporary review, the Monthly Film Bulletin stated that "the continuity is sometimes choppy" and that "the film has been designed and shot with enough surface gloss to ensure that in this soft-core package tour, at least the packaging looks tolerably fresh"

In their Japanese Cinema Encyclopedia: The Sex Films, the Weissers note that the film's plot is a weak construct designed only to give lead actress Kumi Taguchi opportunities to appear nude. They also note that this is not a bad thing. The nude Taguchi seen horseback riding on the beach and riding a porpoise are highlights of this good-looking film, according to the Weissers. The lack of good plotting, however, harms the film. "With just a bit of creativity, they write, "this could have been a great pinku eiga instead of a trendy Penthouse-ish pictorial."

Pink film scholar Jasper Sharp writes that the film appealed to the taste for the exotic in both Japanese and Western audiences. For the Japanese audiences, the association with Emmanuelle Arsan's novel Emmanuelle and the 1974 film based on it, gave the film a touch of class. For Western audiences, the interest of a distant country was an attraction. Both Japanese and Western audiences, writes Sharp, were able to appreciate Kumi Taguchi's "well-proportioned figure and smouldering dark looks".

== Availability ==
Tokyo Emmanuelle in theatrical release for English-speaking audiences

Tokyo Emmanuelle was released theatrically in Japan on July 1, 1975. It was unusually widely circulated for Nikkatsu Roman Porno film. It was released in Germany under the title Wilde Emmanuelle im Paradies der Lust. In 1977 Tokyo Emmanuelle became the first of Nikkatsu's Roman Porno films to be distributed in Britain, when the exploitation studio Intercontinental released the film under the title Emmanuelle in Tokyo. Under the title Tokyo Emmanuelle, it was also playing in Canadian theaters in mid-1977. It was also released in Hong Kong by the Shaw Brothers.

Tokyo Emmanuelle was released on VHS in Japan on August 10, 1988, and re-released in December 1994.

== Bibliography ==
=== English ===
- "TOKYO EMMANUELLE FUJIN". Complete Index to World Film.
- Tokyo Emmanuelle fujin (1976) at IMDb
- Sharp, Jasper (2008). Behind the Pink Curtain: The Complete History of Japanese Sex Cinema. Guildford: FAB Press. pp. 127, 184, 347. ISBN 978-1-903254-54-7.
- Weisser, Thomas; Yuko Mihara Weisser (1998). Japanese Cinema Encyclopedia: The Sex Films. Miami: Vital Books : Asian Cult Cinema Publications. ISBN 1-889288-52-7.

=== Japanese ===
- 東京エマニエル夫人(1975) (in Japanese). allcinema.net.
- 東京エマニエル夫人 (in Japanese). Japanese Cinema Database (Agency for Cultural Affairs).
- 東京エマニエル夫人 (in Japanese). Japanese Movie Database.
- 東京エマニエル夫人(邦画) (in Japanese). Kinema Junpo.
- 東京エマニエル夫人 (in Japanese). www.nikkatsu-romanporno.com.
