= Tanabata no Kuni (TV series) =

- 七夕の国
- Based on: Tanabata no Kuni by Hitoshi Iwaaki
- Written by: Yūsuke Taki; Akiko Miyoshi; Mari Asato; Takamasa Ōe(cooperation)
- Directed by: Takahide Sano; Hayato Kawai; Yūsuke Taki
- Starring: Kanata Hosoda; Ryōko Fujino; Shuhei Uesugi; Mai Kiryuu; Hiroshi Mikami; Yamada Takayuki
- Music by: Yoshitaka Fujimoto
- Country of origin: Japan
- Original language: Japanese
- No. of seasons: 1
- No. of episodes: 10

Production
- Producers: Akihisa Yamamoto; Yusuke Wakabayashi; Tsuyoshi Nakano; Naoya Takahashi
- Production company: Pipeline

Original release
- Network: Disney+
- Release: July 4, 2024

Tanabata no Kuni (Japanese: 七夕の国; lit. 'Land of Tanabata') is a Japanese live-action series based on the manga series Tanabata no Kuni by Hitoshi Iwaaki. The series premiered exclusively on Disney+ in Japan and Hulu in United States on July 4, 2024.

== Plot ==
Yôji Minamimaru, known as Nanmaru, is a college student with a supernatural ability that enables him to "generate small holes in anything." Despite this seemingly insignificant power, he must confront a crisis that threatens the entire world.

== Cast ==
- Kanata Hosoda as Yōji Minamimaru
- Masami Ebihara as Minamimaru's Grandfather
- Ryōko Fujino as Sachiko Higashimaru
- Hiroshi Mikami as Masami Murakami
- Takayuki Yamada as Yoriyuki Murakami
- Shuhei Uesugi as Takashi Higashimaru
- Mai Kiryuu as Sayuri Emi
- Aya Asahina as Yukiko Higashimaru
- Hoshi Ishida as Satō
- Satoshi Kanada as Yagihara

== Production ==
In January 2024, Disney+ revealed that they would adapting Hitoshi Iwaaki's manga series Tanabata no Kuni in a live-action series set to premiere on Disney+'s Star hub in July. Kanata Hosoda was cast in the lead role as Yôji Minamimaru. The series is being directed by Takahide Sano, Hayato Kawai, and Yūsuke Taki, with Taki, Akiko Miyoshi, and Mari Asato handling the scriptwriting, with contribution of Takamasa Ōe.

In May, Disney+ released a new teaser trailer for the live-action series revealing new cast members. Ryōko Fujino, Hiroshi Mikami and Takayuki Yamada were cast as Sachiko Higashimaru, Masami Marukami and Yoriyuki Marukami, respectively.

In June, Disney+ released a full trailer for the series, revealing new cast members such as Aya Asahina, Hoshi Ishida, and Satoshi Kanada. Hulu is promoting the premiere of the series as an exclusive release on Hulu with a three-episode debut on July 5.

In July, a main clip from the series was released. The video features the protagonist, Nanmaru, demonstrating his supernatural ability to 'create small holes in anything' to the other members of his college club.

On July 5th, the official soundtrack composed by Yoshitaka Fujimoto was released.
