= Obon Brothers =

2015 Japanese romantic comedy-drama film

- Poster

Japanese name
- Kanji: お盆の弟
Transcriptions
- Revised Hepburn: Obon no Otōto
- Directed by: Akira Ōsaki
- Screenplay by: Shin Adachi
- Produced by: Tamotsu Kanamori
- Starring: Kiyohiko Shibukawa; Ken Mitsuishi; Kōki Okada
- Cinematography: Masami Inomoto
- Edited by: Makoto Muraishi
- Music by: Taku Unami
- Production companies: Breath; Kirishima 1945
- Release date: July 25, 2015 (Japan)
- Running time: 107 minutes
- Country: Japan
- Language: Japanese

Obon Brothers (Japanese: お盆の弟, Hepburn: Obon no Otōto) is a 2015 Japanese black-and-white romantic comedy-drama film directed by Akira Ōsaki. It was released on July 25, 2015.

== Cast ==
- Kiyohiko Shibukawa
- Ken Mitsuishi
- Kōki Okada
- Aoba Kawai
- Makiko Watanabe

== Reception ==
On The Japan Times, Mark Schilling called the film "one director’s attempt to portray his real life through a fictional self".

At the 37th Yokohama Film Festival, the film was chosen as the 9th best Japanese film of 2015. Shin Adachi won the award for Best Screenplay, Kiyohiko Shibukawa won the award for Best Actor, Ken Mitsuishi won the award for Best Supporting Actor and Aoba Kawai won the award for Best Supporting Actress.
