= Tanabata no Kuni =

Japanese manga series

- First tankōbon volume cover

七夕の国
- Genre: Science fiction
- Manga
- Written by: Hitoshi Iwaaki
- Published by: Shogakukan
- Magazine: Big Comic Spirits
- Original run: 1996 – 1999
- Volumes: 4
- Adaptation
- Drama series (2024)
- icon

Tanabata no Kuni (Japanese: 七夕の国; lit. 'Land of Tanabata') is a Japanese manga series written and illustrated by Hitoshi Iwaaki. It was serialized in Shogakukan's seinen manga magazine Big Comic Spirits from 1996 to 1999, with its chapters collected in four tankōbon volumes. A ten-episode live-action series adaptation was released exclusively on Disney+ from July to August 2024.

== Plot ==
Yōji Minamimaru, a college student with the minor supernatural ability to create small holes in objects without touch, is drawn into a mystery when his professor, Masami Murakami, disappears after visiting "Marugami Village". The professor had recently awakened a similar power, and shortly after, a man linked to a nearby development project is found murdered—his skull mysteriously hollowed out. Yōji and lecturer Emi Sayuri, along with fellow students, travel to the village to investigate.

The village harbors two supernatural abilities: "the ability to see outside the window", a shared nightmare among villagers, and "the ability to reach", a rare power that erases matter within a spherical volume. Only those with both can become the village priest, but wielders of the latter are dwindling. Strange clues—an out-of-season Tanabata festival, historical banners depicting nonexistent birds, and the artificial-looking Mount Marugami—hint at deeper secrets.

For over a thousand years, Marugami Village has resisted outside influence. However, four years prior, clan head Yoriyuki Murakami violated this tradition by aiding an assassination, then began erasing objects in reckless experiments. This drew the attention of an external faction, which sent armed forces to eliminate the village's powers. Yōji and his companions must uncover the truth behind the abilities and the village's hidden past before it is too late.

== Characters ==
Yōji Minamimaru (南丸 洋二, Minamimaru Yōji)
Portrayed by: Kanata Hosoda
Sachiko Higashimaru (東丸 幸子, Higashimaru Sachiko)
Portrayed by: Ryōko Fujino
Masami Murakami (丸神 正美, Murakami Masami)
Portrayed by: Hiroshi Mikami
Yoriyuki Murakami (丸神 頼之, Murakami Yoriyuki)
Portrayed by: Takayuki Yamada
Satō (佐藤)
Portrayed by: Hoshi Ishida
Yagihara (八木原)
Portrayed by: Satoshi Kanada

== Media ==
=== Manga ===
Written and illustrated by Hitoshi Iwaaki, Tanabata no Kuni was serialized in Shogakukan's seinen manga magazine Big Comic Spirits from 1996 to 1999. Shogakukan collected its chapters in four tankōbon volumes, released from June 30, 1997, to February 26, 1999.

==== Volumes ====
No.	Japanese release date	Japanese ISBN
1	June 30, 1997	4-09-184541-X
2	March 30, 1998	4-09-184542-8
3	September 30, 1998	4-09-184543-6
4	February 26, 1999	4-09-184544-4

=== Live-action series ===
In January 2024, it was announced that the series would receive a live-action series adaptation; it premiered on Disney+'s Star platform on July 4 of the same year, and ten episodes were released until August 8.
