= 39th Japan Academy Film Prize =

Japanese film awards in 2016

- Date: March 4, 2016
- Site: Grand Prince Hotel New Takanawa, Tokyo, Japan
- Hosted by: Toshiyuki Nishida; Rie Miyazawa

Highlights
- Most nominations: Our Little Sister (12); 125 Years Memory (10)

The 39th Japan Academy Film Prize (第39回日本アカデミー賞) is the 39th edition of the Japan Academy Film Prize, an award presented by the Nippon Academy-Sho Association to award excellence in filmmaking. It awarded the best films of 2015 and it took place on March 4, 2016 at the Grand Prince Hotel New Takanawa in Tokyo, Japan.

== Nominees ==
=== Awards ===
Picture of the Year	Animation of the Year
Our Little Sister; 125 Years Memory; The Emperor in August; Nagasaki: Memories of My Son; 100 Yen Love	The Boy and the Beast; The Anthem of the Heart; Miss Hokusai; Dragon Ball Z: Resurrection 'F'; Love Live! The School Idol Movie
Director of the Year	Screenplay of the Year
Hirokazu Koreeda – Our Little Sister; Hitoshi Ōne – Bakuman; Masaharu Take – 100 Yen Love; Mitsutoshi Tanaka – 125 Years Memory; Masato Harada – The Emperor in August	Shin Adachi – 100 Yen Love; Eriko Komatsu – 125 Years Memory; Hirokazu Koreeda – Our Little Sister; Masato Harada – The Emperor in August; Yoji Yamada and Emiko Hiramatsu – Nagasaki: Memories of My Son
Outstanding Performance by an Actor in a Leading Role	Outstanding Performance by an Actress in a Leading Role
Kazunari Ninomiya – Nagasaki: Memories of My Son; Seiyō Uchino – 125 Years Memory; Yo Oizumi – Kakekomi; Kōichi Satō – Kishūteneki Terminal; Kōji Yakusho – The Emperor in August	Sakura Ando – 100 Yen Love; Haruka Ayase – Our Little Sister; Kasumi Arimura – Flying Colors; Kirin Kiki – Sweet Bean; Sayuri Yoshinaga – Nagasaki: Memories of My Son
Outstanding Performance by an Actor in a Supporting Role	Outstanding Performance by an Actress in a Supporting Role
Masahiro Motoki – The Big Bee and The Emperor in August; Tadanobu Asano – Nagasaki: Memories of My Son; Hirofumi Arai – 100 Yen Love; Atsushi Itō – Flying Colors; Shōta Sometani – Bakuman	Haru Kuroki – Nagasaki: Memories of My Son; Kaho – Our Little Sister; Masami Nagasawa – Our Little Sister; Hikari Mitsushima – Kakekomi; Yō Yoshida – Flying Colors
Outstanding Achievement in Music	Outstanding Achievement in Cinematography
Sakanaction – Bakuman (Motion Music of Bakuman); Michiru Ōshima – 125 Years Memory; Yoko Kanno – Our Little Sister; Harumi Fūki – The Emperor in August; Gorō Yasukawa – Solomon's Perjury Part 1: Suspicion	Mikiya Takimoto – Our Little Sister; Takahide Shibanushi – The Emperor in August; Masashi Chikamori – Nagasaki: Memories of My Son; Tetsuo Nagata – 125 Years Memory; Masakazu Fujisawa – Solomon's Perjury Part 1: Suspicion
Outstanding Achievement in Lighting Direction	Outstanding Achievement in Art Direction
Norikiyo Fujii – Our Little Sister; Takaaki Miyanishi – The Emperor in August; Kōichi Watanabe – Nagasaki: Memories of My Son; Kiyoto Andō – 125 Years Memory; Masao Kanazawa – Solomon's Perjury Part 1: Suspicion	Hidefumi Hanaya – 125 Years Memory; Yūji Tsuzuki – Bakuman; Mitsuo Degawa – Nagasaki: Memories of My Son; Tetsuo Harada – The Emperor in August; Keiko Mitsuya – Our Little Sister
Outstanding Achievement in Sound Recording	Outstanding Achievement in Film Editing
Nobuhiko Matsukage – 125 Years Memory; Kazumi Kishida – Nagasaki: Memories of My Son; Yutaka Tsurumaki – Our Little Sister; Yasumasa Terui (Recording) and Masato Yano (Voicing) – The Emperor in August; Shinji Watanabe – Bakuman	Yasuyuki Ōzeki – Bakuman; Iwao Ishii – Nagasaki: Memories of My Son; Akimasa Kawashima – 125 Years Memory; Hirokazu Koreeda – Our Little Sister; Yūjin Harada – The Emperor in August
Outstanding Foreign Language Film	Newcomer of the Year
American Sniper; Kingsman: The Secret Service; Whiplash; Mad Max: Fury Road; Spectre	Kasumi Arimura – Flying Colors; Tao Tsuchiya – Orange; Suzu Hirose – Our Little Sister; Ryōko Fujino – Solomon's Perjury; Atsushi Shinohara – Three Stories of Love; Yojiro Noda – Pieta in the Toilet; Kento Yamazaki – Orange and Heroine Shikkaku; Ryosuke Yamada – Assassination Classroom
Special Award from the Association	Special Award of Honour from the Association
Kazuo Matsuda (Costume Designer); Gal Enterprise Inc. (Trailer Production)	Tatsuya Nakadai (Actor)
Popularity Award	
Bakuman (Production Category); Momoiro Clover Z – Maku ga Agaru (Actor Category)	
