= Ken Mitsuishi =

Japanese actor (born 1961)

- 光石 研
- Born: 26 September 1961 (age 65); Yahata Nishi-ku, Kitakyushu, Japan
- Occupation: Actor
- Years active: 1978 - present

Ken Mitsuishi (光石 研, Mitsuishi Ken; born September 26, 1961) is a Japanese actor. He has appeared in films such as Chaos and Tokyo Playboy Club.

== Filmography ==
=== Film ===
1980s

- Tora's Tropical Fever (1980)
- Foster Daddy, Tora! (1980)
- Sailor Suit and Machine Gun (1981)
- Tora-san, the Expert (1982)
- Okinawan Boys (1983)
- Tora-san's Island Encounter (1985)
- Final Take (1986)

1990s

- No Worries on the Recruit Front (1991)
- Fireworks, Should We See It from the Side or the Bottom? (1993)
- Love Letter (1995)
- Helpless (1996)
- Swallowtail (1996)
- The Pillow Book (1996), The Husband
- Two Punks (1996)
- The Eel (1997)
- April Story (1998)
- Tokyo Eyes (1998)
- The Thin Red Line (1998)
- Audition (1999)
- Shady Glove (1999)

2000s

- Gojoe: Spirit War Chronicle (2000)
- Whiteout (2000)
- Chaos (2000), Komiyama
- Eureka (2000)
- Hush! (2001), Shoji Kurita
- 2009 Lost Memories (2002), Hideyo
- Border Line (2002)
- KT (2002)
- Harmful Insect (2002)
- Dead End Run (2003)
- Fuon (2004)
- Tokyo Noir (2004)
- Lady Joker (2004)
- Out of This World (2004)
- Scrap Heaven (2005)
- Noriko's Dinner Table (2005), Tetsuzo Shimabara
- Aegis (2005)
- Crickets (2006)
- Sugar and Spice (2006)
- The Pavillion Salamandre (2006), Morihiro Kagawa
- Invisible Waves (2006), Lizard
- Thank You (2006)
- I Just Didn't Do It (2007)
- Tokyo Tower: Mom and Me, and Sometimes Dad (2007)
- Exte (2007)
- Sad Vacation (2007)
- Kaidan (2007)
- Nightmare Detective 2 (2008), Takio Kagenuma
- Tokyo! (2008)
- Oppai Volleyball (2009)

2010s

- Heaven's Story (2010), Shioya
- Nude (2010), Enomoto
- 13 Assassins (2010)
- Villain (2010)
- Wandering Home (2010), Kito Onigashira
- Tokyo Oasis (2011)
- Oba: The Last Samurai (2011)
- Himizu (2011)
- A Man with Style (2011)
- Rent-a-Cat (2012)
- Tokyo Playboy Club (2012)
- Bread of Happiness (2012)
- Outrage Beyond (2012)
- Dawn of a Filmmaker (2013)
- The Backwater (2013)
- Homeland (2014)
- Three Stories of Love (2015)
- The Big Bee (2015)
- A Cappella (2016)
- A Man Called Pirate (2016)
- Natsumi's Fipanly (2016)
- Shin Godzilla (2016), the governor of Tokyo
- 14 That Night (2016), Takashi's father
- Golden Orchestra (2016)
- Outrage Coda (2017), Gomi
- Side Job (2017)
- Before We Vanish (2017), Suzuki
- Pumpkin and Mayonnaise (2017), Yasuhara
- Evil and the Mask (2018), Sakakibara
- My Friend A (2018)
- A Forest of Wool and Steel (2018), Akino
- Mori, The Artist's Habitat (2018), Asahina
- The Chaplain (2018)
- The Fable (2019), Hamada
- Strawberry Song (2019)
- Mio on the Shore (2019)
- Ninkyō Gakuen (2019)
- Listen to the Universe (2019)
- Black School Rules (2019), Toshio Inoue
- I Was a Secret Bitch (2019)
- And Life Goes On: The Movie (2019)

2020s

- A Beloved Wife (2020)
- Blue, Painful, Fragile (2020)
- A Balance (2021)
- The Supporting Actors: The Movie (2021), himself
- The Cinematic Liars of Asahi-za (2021)
- My Daddy (2021), Chu-san
- One Day, You Will Reach the Sea (2022)
- BL Metamorphosis (2022), Numata
- In Love and Deep Water (2023)
- Ripples (2023)
- Dreaming in Between (2023)
- Schoolyard Sparkles (2023)
- All the Long Nights (2024)
- Dear Family (2024), Eiji Ishiguro
- The Hotel of My Dream (2024)
- Cells at Work! (2024)
- BAUS: The Ship's Voyage Continues (2025)
- On Summer Sand (2025), Takanobu Mochida
- Frontline: Yokohama Bay (2025), Todoroki
- Sham (2025), Shigeharu Danta
- Night Flower (2025), Shinji Tada
- Until We Meet Again (2026), Minoru Bando
- Love≠Comedy (2026), Kenji Yamamura
- All That Exists (2027), Koichi Fujishima
- Sins of Kujo: The Movie (2027), Nobuteru Nagaregi

=== Television dramas ===
- Oshin (1983)
- Ghost Soup (1992)
- Gift (1997)
- Bayside Shakedown (1998)
- The Eldest Boy and His Three Elder Sisters (2003), Shuichi Yoneyama
- Yoshitsune (2005), Minamoto no Nakatsuna
- Fūrin Kazan (2007), Yamamoto Sadahisa
- Shingari (2015), Katase
- Fukigen na Kajitsu (2016), Tetsushi Tsukui
- Cold Case (2016), Tōru Kaneko
- Midnight Diner: Tokyo Stories (2016)
- The Supporting Actors (2017), himself
- Frankenstein's Love (2017), Keijirō Inaba
- Hiyokko (2017), Gorō Fukuda
- Shimokitazawa Die Hard (2017), himself
- Rikuoh (2017), Tōru Arimura
- Naotora: The Lady Warlord (2017), Akechi Mitsuhide
- Kiss that Kills (2018), Akira Dojima
- The Supporting Actors 2 (2018), himself
- When a Tree Falls (2018)
- Designer Shibui Naoto no Kyūjitsu (2019), Naoto Shibui
- In Hand (2019), Hajime Amino
- And Life Goes On (2019)
- Yell (2020), Yasutaka Sekiuchi
- Our Sister's Soulmate (2020), Kikuo Kawakami
- The Supporting Actors 3 (2021), himself
- Pension Metsa (2021)
- Roppongi Class (2022), Shinji Miyabe
- A Day-Off of Hana Sugisaki (2023)
- The Days (2023)
- Minami-kun ga Koibito!? (2024), Shinichi Yamataka
- The Big Chase: Tokyo SSBC Files (2025), Shigeru Kuzuhara
- Chosen Home (2025), Jin Ichigaya
- Sins of Kujo (2026), Nobuteru Nagaragi

=== Video games ===
- Lost Judgment (2021), Akihiro Ehara

== Awards and nominations ==
Year	Award	Category	Work(s)	Result	Ref.
2016	37th Yokohama Film Festival	Best Supporting Actor	Three Stories of Love	Won	
2022	76th Mainichi Film Awards	Best Supporting Actor	A Balance	Nominated	
2025	18th Asian Film Awards	Best Supporting Actor	All the Long Nights	Nominated	
