= Kyō wa Kaisha Yasumimasu =

Japanese manga series by Mari Fujimura

- First volume cover

きょうは会社休みます。
- Genre: Romance, slice-of-life
- Manga
- Written by: Mari Fujimura
- Published by: Shueisha
- Imprint: Margaret Comics
- Magazine: Cocohana
- Original run: November 28, 2011 – January 28, 2017
- Volumes: 13
- Television drama
- Directed by: Satoru Nakajima; Shunsuke Kariyama
- Produced by: Hiroko Hazeyama; Takayuki Akimoto
- Written by: Shigeki Kaneko
- Music by: Masahiro Tokuda
- Studio: Office Crescendo
- Original network: Nippon TV
- Original run: October 15, 2014 – December 17, 2014
- Episodes: 10

Kyō wa Kaisha Yasumimasu (きょうは会社休みます。; "I'm Taking off Work Today") is a Japanese manga series written and illustrated by Mari Fujimura. It was serialized in Shueisha's josei manga magazine Cocohana from November 28, 2011, to January 28, 2013, with its chapters compiled into thirteen volumes.

A live-action television drama adaptation starring Haruka Ayase, Sota Fukushi, Riisa Naka, Junnosuke Taguchi and Yudai Chiba aired on Nippon TV in Japan from October 15, 2014, to December 17, 2014.

== Volumes ==
| No. | Japanese release date | Japanese ISBN |
|---|---|---|
| 1 | April 25, 2012 | 978-4-08-846769-6 |
| 2 | August 24, 2012 | 978-4-08-846820-4 |
| 3 | February 25, 2013 | 978-4-08-845002-5 |
| 4 | July 25, 2013 | 978-4-08-845076-6 |
| 5 | December 25, 2013 | 978-4-08-845149-7 |
| 6 | May 23, 2014 | 978-4-08-845217-3 |
| 7 | September 25, 2014 | 978-4-08-845274-6 |
| 8 | February 25, 2015 | 978-4-08-845353-8 |
| 9 | July 24, 2015 | 978-4-08-845424-5 |
| 10 | December 25, 2015 | 978-4-08-845504-4 |
| 11 | May 25, 2016 | 978-4-08-845583-9 |
| 12 | October 25, 2016 | 978-4-08-845658-4 |
| 13 | March 24, 2017 | 978-4-08-845739-0 |

== Reception ==
The series was number three on the 2013 Kono Manga ga Sugoi! Top 20 Manga for Female Readers survey. It was number eleven in Zenkoku Shotenin ga Eranda Osusume Comic 2013, a 2013 ranking of the top 15 manga recommended by Japanese bookstores. It was number two on the Book of the Year list of Female-Oriented Comics from January to June, 2013 by Da Vinci magazine It was number nine in the 2013 Comic Natalie Grand Prize.

As of September 2, 2012, volume 1 has sold 86,094 copies, and volume 2 has sold 67,247 copies. By March 16, 2013, volume 3 had sold 239,277 copies, and it was the 95th best-selling manga volume in the period of November 19, 2012, to November 17, 2013, with 428,163 copies sold. As of August 18, 2013, volume 4 has sold 327,977 copies.
