= 37th Yokohama Film Festival =

2016 film festival in Yokohama, Japan

- Location: Yokohama, Kanagawa, Japan
- Founded: 1980
- Festival date: 2016

The 37th Yokohama Film Festival (第37回ヨコハマ映画祭) was held in 2016 in Yokohama, Kanagawa, Japan.

== Awards ==
- Best Film: - Our Little Sister
- Best Director:
  - Hirokazu Koreeda - Our Little Sister
  - Ryōsuke Hashiguchi - Koibitotachi
- Yoshimitsu Morita Memorial Best New Director: Daishi Matsunaga - Pieta in the Toilet
- Best Screenplay: Shin Adachi - 100 Yen Love, Obon Brothers
- Best Cinematographer: Mikiya Takemoto - Our Little Sister
- Best Actor:
  - Masatoshi Nagase - Sweet Bean
  - Kiyohiko Shibukawa - Obon Brothers, Areno
- Best Actress: Haruka Ayase - Our Little Sister
- Best Supporting Actor: Ken Mitsuishi - Obon Brothers, Koibitotachi
- Best Supporting Actress: Aoba Kawai - Obon Brothers, Kabukicho Love Hotel
- Best Newcomer:
  - Suzu Hirose - Our Little Sister
  - Hana Sugisaki - Pieta in the Toilet, The Pearls of the Stone Man
  - Ryōko Fujino - Solomon's Perjury
- Examiner Special Award: Bakuman staff and casts
- Special Grand Prize: Kirin Kiki

== Best 10 ==
1. Our Little Sister
2. Koibitotachi
3. 100 Yen Love
4. Bakuman
5. Nobi: Fires on the Plain
6. Sweet Bean
7. Journey to the Shore
8. Pieta in the Toilet
9. Obon Brothers
10. Kabukicho Love Hotel

runner-up: Flying Colors
