= Daichi Kaneko =

Japanese actor (born 1996)

- 金子 大地
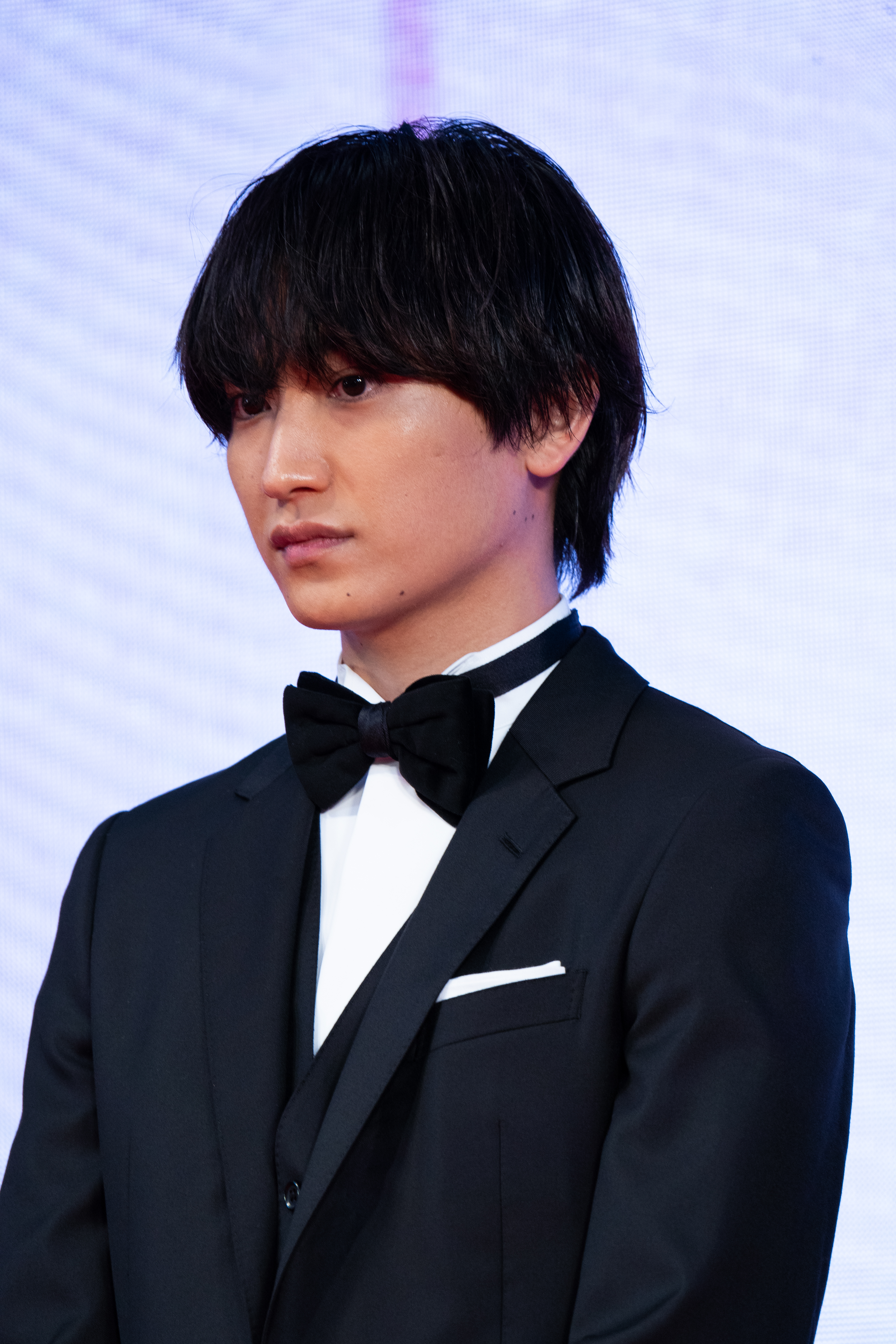
- Kaneko at the 32nd Tokyo International Film Festival in 2019
- Born: September 26, 1996 (age 30); Hokkaido, Japan
- Years active: 2015–present
- Agent: Amuse Inc.

Daichi Kaneko (Japanese: 金子 大地, Hepburn: Kaneko Daichi; born September 26, 1996) is a Japanese actor.

== Life and career ==
Kaneko is from Hokkaido.

On October 13, 2014, Kaneko won the Amuse Audition Festival 2014, hosted by Amuse Inc., in the actor and model category.

In 2019, Kaneko had his first starring role in Fujoshi, Ukkari Gay ni Kokuru as Jun Andō. He had his first starring role in a film in 2021 with Colorless.

In June 2022, Kaneko made his first appearance in a taiga drama as Minamoto no Yoriie in The 13 Lords of the Shogun.

In August 2022, Kaneko released his first photo book, with photographs of him in Hokkaido.

== Filmography ==
=== Film ===
| Year | Title | Role | Notes | Ref. |
|---|---|---|---|---|
| 2015 | Typhoon Noruda | Kenta Saijo | Voice | |
| 2018 | Missions of Love | Hisame Kitami | | |
| 2018 | Family Story | Shibata | | |
| 2019 | School-Live! | Tsumugi Katsuragi | | |
| 2019 | Dosukoi! Sukehira | Hayato Mabuchi | | |
| 2019 | He Won't Kill, She Won't Die | Ikemen-kun | | |
| 2020 | You Are the Beginning of the World | Io | | |
| 2021 | The Supporting Actors: The Movie | Himself | | |
| 2021 | Colorless | Shūji Oyamada | Lead role | |
| 2021 | It's a Summer Film | Rintaro | | |
| 2021 | What Exactly Am I Fighting Against? | Kaneko | | |
| 2022 | Pure Japanese | Ninomiya | | |
| 2023 | Winny | Kosuke Yamamoto | | |
| 2023 | Heartless | Kō | Lead role | |
| 2024 | 52-Hertz Whales | Mahoro Muranaka | | |
| 2024 | Desert of Namibia | Hayashi | | |
| 2026 | All Greens | Koichi Sato | | |
| 2026 | Kyojo: Reunion | Kasahara | | |
| 2026 | Kyojo: Requiem | Kasahara | | |
| 2026 | Iroha | | Voice | |
| 2027 | The Intertwining | Kenta | | |

=== Television ===
| Year | Title | Role | Notes | Ref. |
|---|---|---|---|---|
| 2017 | Shimokitazawa Die Hard | Takuya | Episode 9 | |
| 2018 | Missions of Love | Hisame Kitami | | |
| 2018 | Ossan's Love | Utamaro Kuribayashi | | |
| 2019 | My Uncle: Wataoji | Shinjitsu Hoshino | Episode 7 | |
| 2019 | Fujoshi, Ukkari Gay ni Kokuru | Jun Andō | Lead role | |
| 2019 | Cheat: Please Be Careful, Scammers | Haruto Kamo | | |
| 2020 | An Incurable Case of Love | Mitsuyoshi Kanda | Episode 1–2 | |
| 2020 | Osha House Sommelier Oshako! | Luto Kiriku | Episode 1 | |
| 2020 | Shonan Junai Gumi | Ryuji Danma | | |
| 2022 | Shimobē | Tatsuma Sasaki | | |
| 2022 | The 13 Lords of the Shogun | Minamoto no Yoriie | Taiga drama | |
| 2022 | Renovation Like Magic | Akira Kubodera | | |
| 2022 | Doronjo | Gan Takaiwata | | |
| 2023 | My Father Is a Detective | Harukaze Akizuki | Lead role | |
| 2023 | The Inugamis | Sukekiyo Inugami | | |
| 2023 | Sanctuary | Murata | | |
| 2026 | Blossom | Tamotsu Kimura | Asadora | |
