= Oppai Volleyball =

- Theatrical release poster

Japanese name
- Kanji: おっぱいバレー
Transcriptions
- Revised Hepburn: Oppai Barē
- Directed by: Eiichirō Hasumi
- Screenplay by: Yoshikazu Okada
- Story by: Munenori Mizuno
- Produced by: Toru Horikoshi; Ryuhei Chiba; Shuji Abe; Shigeyuki Endo; Yoshitaka Hori; Shinichiro Nishigaki; Fumihiro Hirai
- Starring: Haruka Ayase; Munetaka Aoki; Tōru Nakamura; Hiromasa Taguchi; Takuya Ishida; Suzuka Ohgo; Ken Mitsuishi
- Cinematography: Hiromitsu Nishimura
- Edited by: Hiroshi Matsuo
- Music by: Naoki Satō
- Production company: Warner Bros. Pictures
- Distributed by: Toei Company
- Release date: April 18, 2009 (Japan)
- Running time: 102 minutes
- Country: Japan
- Language: Japanese

Oppai Volleyball (Japanese: おっぱいバレー, Hepburn: Oppai Barē) is a 2009 Japanese comedy film directed by Eiichirō Hasumi and starring Haruka Ayase, Suzuka Ohgo and Tōru Nakamura. It was written by Yoshikazu Okada and Munenori Mizuno, produced by Warner Bros. Pictures and distributed by Toei Company.

== Cast ==
- Haruka Ayase as Mikako Terashima
- Suzuka Ohgo as young Mikako
- Munetaka Aoki as Kazuki Jo
- Tōru Nakamura as Kenji Horiuchi (as Toru Nakamura)
- Takuya Ishida as volleyball senior
- Hiromasa Taguchi as Ryuo (volleyball coach)
- Ken Mitsuishi as head coach

== Reception ==
In the Taipei Times Ian Bartholomew wrote: "Oppai Volleyball is a rather innocent little piece of cinema, a junior high school version of National Lampoon with an inspirational message at the end. ... The potentially serious moral implications of the contract between the teacher and her students is at no point regarded as being of the slightest interest, which is in many ways a blessing, leaving Oppai Volleyball as an innocuous piece of inconsequential fluff with no aspirations to be anything else.

In the South China Morning Post, Clarence Tsui wrote: "Despite its title – oppai is Japanese for breasts – what's most remarkable about Eiichiro Hasumi's film is how mundane it is. ... While it's easy to take aim at the mild chauvinism that drives the humour of the story ... Volleyball is perhaps more troubling for being a pedestrian exemplar of that dated genre known as the high-school rite-of-passage drama. The transformation of the students is just too easy: the weaklings become able players with just a few weeks of training, and their sweaty teenage sexuality (they're seen peeping into female changing rooms at the start and drooling over Mikako's physique as she does stretching exercises) is too easily shed to reveal a glowing humanity within. A subplot explaining Mikako's dedication to teaching adds tear-jerking drama and only serves to highlight the emotional manipulation that sours the whole undertaking."

Christie Barber of Macquarie University wrote: "Oppai Volleyball works to disrupt established ideas about masculinity, as competence in volleyball does not determine the team members’ sense of self-worth, or acceptance by peers. ... [The] depictions of dominant and subordinated masculinities in the film seem to function in two ways. First, they offer fictive representations of the hierarchies that exist within masculinities in the actual lives of viewers, and thus highlight the tensions and pressures involved in forming masculine subjectivity. Second, they highlight what some consider to be an out-dated and ineffective coaching methodology, said to be based on traditional values."

== Accolades ==
Haruka Ayase won the 52nd Blue Ribbon Awards for Best Actress for her role in the film.
