= Kanojo ga Suki na Mono wa Homo de Atte Boku de wa Nai =

Japanese novel written by Naoto Asahara

- Cover of the novel
- Author: Naoto Asahara
- Original title: 彼女が好きなものはホモであって僕ではない
- Cover artist: Yōjirō Arai
- Language: Japanese
- Genre: Coming-of-age, romance
- Published: February 21, 2018
- Publisher: Kadokawa
- Publication place: Japan
- Media type: Print (paperback)
- ISBN: 978-4-04-072513-0

Kanojo ga Suki na Mono wa Homo de Atte Boku de wa Nai (Japanese: 彼女が好きなものは ホモであって僕ではない; lit. "What She Likes Are Homosexuals, Not Me") is a Japanese novel by Naoto Asahara. The chapters were serialized on the website Kakuyomu from October 12 to October 28, 2016, before later receiving a print publication from Kadokawa, with the cover illustrated by Yōjirō Arai. The novel follows Jun Andō, a gay high school student who befriends his classmate Sae Miura, a fujoshi who helps him become comfortable with his sexual identity.

Kanojo ga Suki na Mono wa Homo de Atte Boku de wa Nai received favorable reviews, and since its publication, it has received several adaptations. A 2019 live-action television drama titled Fujoshi, Ukkari Gay ni Kokuru (腐女子、うっかりゲイに告る。; lit. "A Fujoshi Thoughtlessly Confesses to a Gay Man") was broadcast on NHK, which won the Galaxy Award Monthly Prize and Best Script at the Confidence Award Drama Prize. To accompany the television broadcast, a manga adaptation was serialized on ComicWalker from February 1, 2019, to March 3, 2020. A 2021 live-action film titled Kanojo ga Suki na Mono wa (彼女が好きなものは; lit. "What She Likes Are") is slated for release in Q4 2021.

== Plot ==
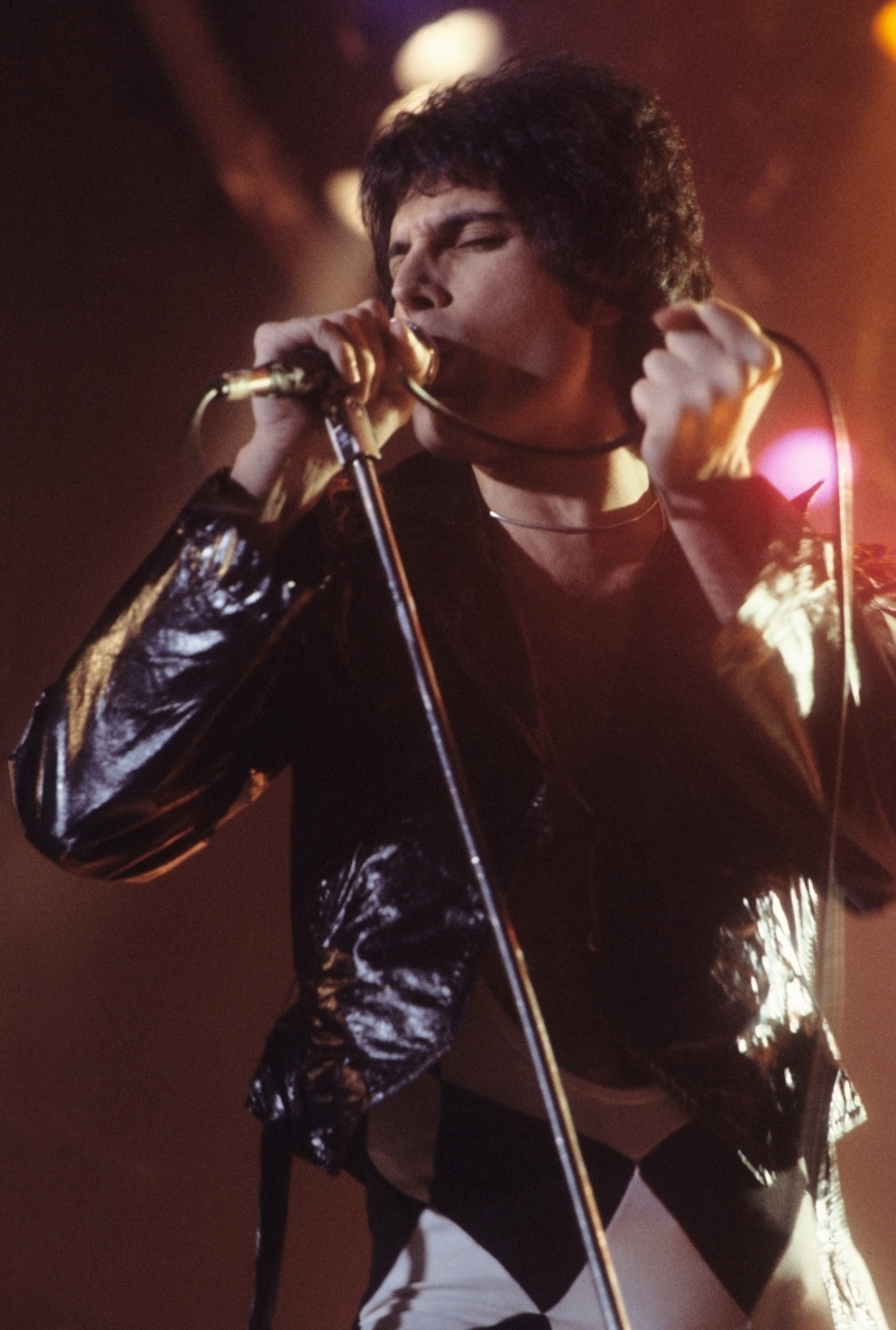
Queen is a recurring motif appearing in the series. Freddie Mercury's status as a gay icon is noted in the series.

Jun Andō is a closeted gay high school student living in Tokyo, with the only people knowing about his sexuality being his boyfriend, Makoto, another closeted gay man who is married with children; Mr. Fahrenheit, his gay online friend and who shares his interest in Queen and is dating a man afflicted with HIV; and Kate, a lesbian and owner of Jun's favorite café. One day, Jun catches his classmate, Sae Miura, buying yaoi manga. Miura admits that she is secretly a fujoshi and, having lost her circle of friends in middle school after they discovered her hobby, she makes him promise not to tell anyone. While Jun finds yaoi to be offensive, as he believes it does not realistically portray the struggles of gay people, he agrees anyway.

As Jun and Miura grow closer, Miura confesses she has fallen in love with him during Golden Week. In an effort to try to live up to the expectations of society, Jun begins dating her, and despite his interest in her, he cannot bring himself to have sex. While discussing relationships with Mr. Fahrenheit, he reveals to Jun that his boyfriend died from AIDS last May; after their parents had discovered their relationship and that he had contracted HIV from him, they forbade them from meeting each other and he was denied the opportunity to attend his boyfriend's funeral. He makes Jun promise to return his copy of Queen II to his boyfriend's grave when he finally succumbs to AIDS. Following the conversation, Mr. Fahrenheit stops going online.

Later, Jun and Miura go on a double date to an onsen, where Makoto is also present on a family trip. Jun suddenly receives a scheduled e-mail from Mr. Fahrenheit, who tells him that he will be committing suicide to be with his boyfriend. Distraught, Jun runs to Makoto, and Miura catches the two of them together, resulting in an argument. After reflecting, Jun decides to tell Miura the truth about his sexuality, but their classmate, Ono, overhears their conversation and mocks Jun, starting a fist fight. By the next school day, the entire class has found out about his sexuality. Overwhelmed, he attempts suicide by jumping from the school building.

Jun survives with a broken arm and is hospitalized for one month. After his mother learns about his sexuality, she vows to support him, and the two decide to move to Osaka. In addition, Miura and Jun's friend Ryōhei continue to visit him. Miura lends him her yaoi manga, and as she begins to understand Jun more, she asks him to attend the end-of-term school assembly, where she will be given an award for her painting. As promised, Jun briefly attends amidst the hostility from his classmates. During the event, Miura suddenly takes the microphone to announce her support for gay people, explaining how Jun helped her accept herself and her interest in yaoi. This causes the student body to cheer, and when the teachers attempt to silence her, Ono takes the microphone, also expressing his support for Jun. Jun gets up on the stage and kisses Miura.

Several days before Jun moves away, he visits Mr. Fahrenheit's house with Miura to pay respects and fulfill his promise, where he learns that Mr. Fahrenheit had lied about his age and was, in fact, a middle school student. At the end of the day, Miura breaks up with Jun to help the both of them move on. Realizing Makoto is unable to leave his family, Jun breaks up with him as well. On the final day, Jun goes to a gallery where Miura's painting is displayed, discovering that she had painted him and titled the painting "Falling in Love." In the epilogue, Jun attends his new school in Osaka, with a positive outlook.

== Characters ==
Jun Andō (安藤 純, Andō Jun)
Portrayed by: Daichi Kaneko (2019 TV drama), Fūju Kamio (2021 film)
Jun is a closeted gay high school student. His favorite band is Queen. His parents gave birth to him when they were university students and divorced when he was young. He lives with his mother and has not seen his father in 10 years.
Sae Miura (三浦 紗枝, Miura Sae)
Portrayed by: Ryōko Fujino (2019 TV drama), Anna Yamada (2021 film)
Miura is Jun's classmate and a fujoshi, who enjoys yaoi. She asks Jun to keep this a secret, having lost her circle of friends in middle school after they discovered her hobby. As she gets to know Jun, she falls in love with him. After Jun reveals he is gay, she becomes understanding about his situation and is one of the only classmates who supports him when the class turns against him. At the end of the novel, she breaks up with Jun to help the two of them move on with their lives.
Ryōhei Takaoka (高岡 亮平, Takaoka Ryōhei)
Portrayed by: Yuki Ogoe (2019 TV drama), Ōshirō Maeda (2021 film)
Ryōhei is Jun's childhood friend. He is in love with Miura. After he learns that Jun is gay, he is one of the only classmates who supports him when the class turns against him.
Makoto (マコト)
Portrayed by: Shōsuke Tanihara (2019 TV drama), Tsubasa Imai (2021 film)
Makoto is Jun's boyfriend. Like Jun, Makoto is also secretly gay, but he keeps his sexual identity and relationship with Jun secret from his family. He is married with a daughter in middle school and a son who is around Jun's age. The two met after Jun responded to Makoto's dating post online, and per conditions given by Makoto, Jun calls him "father" during sex and believes he is being used to displace his lust for his son. Likewise, Jun believes he is attracted to Makoto because he did not have a father figure growing up. At the end of the novel, he ends their relationship, realizing that Makoto is unable to leave his family to be with him.
Mr. Fahrenheit (ミスター・ファーレンハイト, Misutā Fārenhaito)
Portrayed by: Kensho Ono (voice), Kaito Komie (episode 8) (2019 TV drama), Hayato Isomura (2021 film)
Mr. Fahrenheit is Jun's online friend, and Jun knows very little of his true identity. His username comes from the song "Don't Stop Me Now" by Queen, who is also his favorite band. Like Jun, he is also gay and dating a man at least a decade his senior. He runs a blog chronicling his relationship with his boyfriend, who is HIV positive. Jun becomes friends with Mr. Fahrenheit after finding his blog and continues asking him for advice. Mr. Fahrenheit later reveals he is HIV positive, having contracted it from his boyfriend. Following his boyfriend's death, he confesses to Jun that his boyfriend is cousin, and that after their parents discovered their relationship and illness, they forbade them to contact each other and he was not allowed to attend his funeral. He asks Jun to return Queen II to his boyfriend's grave when he eventually succumbs to AIDS. However, Mr. Fahrenheit dies by suicide. When Jun visits his home to fulfill his promise, he learns that Mr. Fahrenheit lied about being an older man and was a middle school student at his time of death.
Yūsuke Ono (小野 雄介, Ono Yūsuke)
Portrayed by: Shūichirō Naitō (2019 TV drama), Ryōta Miura (2021 film)
Ono is Jun's classmate and acts as the leader of the class.
Kate (ケイト, Keito)
Portrayed by: Sarah Alainn (2019 TV drama)
Kate is the owner of the café named '39, where Jun frequents, and hails from England. She is lesbian. After recommending Queen's music to Jun, they have become his favorite band.
Imamiya (今宮) (Note: For the 2019 live-action television drama adaptation, Imamiya was given the name Mai Imamiya (今宮 麻衣, Imamiya Mai). For the 2021 live-action film adaptation, she was given the name Kurumi Imamiya (今宮 くるみ, Imamiya Kurumi).)
Portrayed by: Madoka Yoshida (2019 TV drama), Akana Ikeda (2021 film)
Imamiya is one of Jun's classmates and Miura's friend. She is in love with Ryōhei, but she accepts that he loves Miura.
Jun's mother (Note: For the 2019 live-action television drama adaptation, Jun's mother was given the name Yōko Andō (安藤 陽子, Andō Yōko). For the 2021 live-action film adaptation, she was given the name Mizuki Andō (安藤 みづき, Andō Mizuki).)
Portrayed by: Tamae Andō (2019 TV drama), Sayaka Yamaguchi (2021 film)
Jun's mother is a single mother who had him as a first-year university student and divorced her husband 10 years ago. After learning Jun is gay, she becomes extremely supportive of him.
Nao Sakura (佐倉 奈緒, Sakura Nao)
Portrayed by: Ayano Mochizuki (2019 TV drama), Tōko Miura (2021 film)
Sakura is an older woman who is Miura's fujoshi friend.
Hayato Kondō (近藤 隼人, Kondō Hayato)
Portrayed by: Kazunori Kameshima (2019 TV drama), Daichi Watanabe (2021 film)
Kondō is Sakura's boyfriend. Despite accepting Sakura's interest in yaoi, he is homophobic and expresses his disgust of gay people to Jun several times.

== Media ==
=== Novel ===
Kanojo ga Suki na Mono wa Homo de Atte Boku de wa Nai is written by Naoto Asahara. It was serialized on the website Kakuyomu from October 12 to October 28, 2016. It later received a print publication from Kadokawa with illustrations provided by Yōjirō Arai.

In an interview with Kadokawa, Asahara mentioned some parts of the novel were based on his personal experiences, such as self-loathing. He had not intended to write the novel as a commentary on LGBT issues and society, but that he had wanted to depict a young gay person in present time with focus on human emotions.

No.	Japanese release date	Japanese ISBN
1	February 21, 2018; June 12, 2020 (reprint)	978-4-04-072513-0; ISBN 978-4-04-073510-8 (reprint)
1. Track 1: "Good Old Fashioned Lover Boy"; 2. Track 2: "I Want it All"; 3. Track 3: "The Show Must Go On"; 4. Track 4: "The March of the Black Queen"; 5. Track 5: "Bohemian Rhapsody"; 6. Track 6: "Somebody to Love"; 7. Track 7: "Love of My Life"; 8. Track 8: "Teo Toriatte"; 9. Bonus Track: "Don't Stop Me Now"

=== Television drama ===
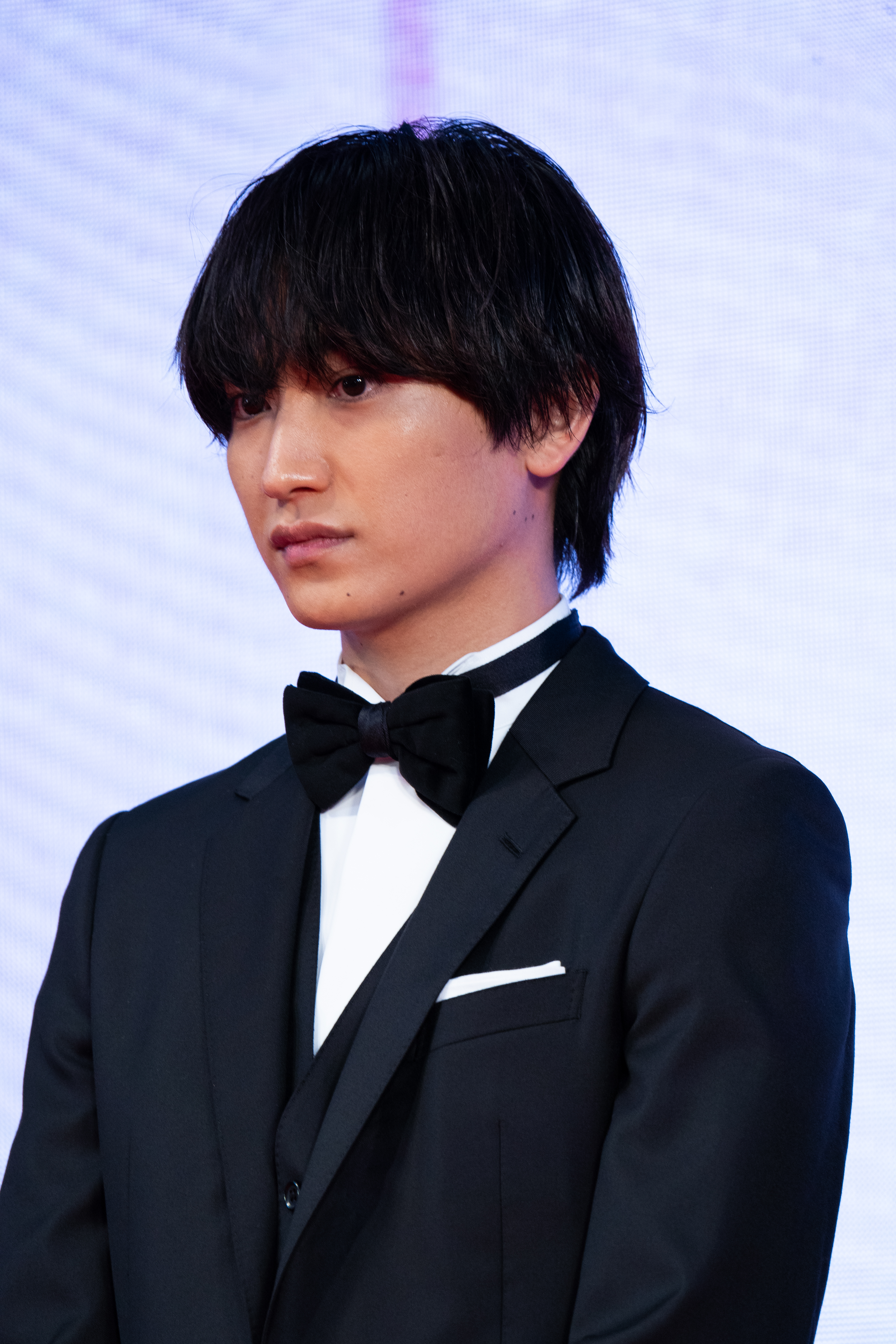
Daichi Kaneko (2019) portrayed Jun in the television drama

A live-action television drama series adaptation titled Fujoshi, Ukkari Gay ni Kokuru (腐女子、うっかりゲイに告る。; lit. "A Fujoshi Thoughtlessly Confesses to a Gay Man") was announced on February 1, 2019, with Daichi Kaneko starring as Jun Andō. Additional cast members include Ryōko Fujino as Sae Miura, Yuki Ogoe as Ryōhei Takaoka, Tamae Andō as Yōko Andō (Jun's mother), and Shōsuke Tanihara as Makoto. It is directed by Makoto Bonkobara and Keisuke Oshima. The series was broadcast weekly on NHK on the YoruDra programming block beginning on April 20, 2019. Similar to the novel, the television drama series uses a motif based on Queen, Jun's favorite band, and all episodes are named after their songs. Producer Takuya Shimizu noted that the television drama adaptation had come after a string of live-action yaoi series that had become popular in the recent years, as well as the release of Bohemian Rhapsody, but had insisted the timing was coincidental.

No.	Title	Directed by	Written by	Original release date
1	"Good Old Fashioned Lover Boy"	Makoto Bonkobara	Naoyuki Miura	April 20, 2019
2	"I Want it All"	Makoto Bonkobara	Naoyuki Miura	April 27, 2019
3	"The Show Must Go On"	Makoto Bonkobara	Naoyuki Miura	May 4, 2019
4	"The March of the Black Queen"	Keisuke Oshima	Naoyuki Miura	May 11, 2019
5	"Bohemian Rhapsody"	Keisuke Oshima	Naoyuki Miura	May 18, 2019
6	"Somebody to Love"	Yūsuke Onoda	Naoyuki Miura	May 25, 2019
7	"We Will Rock You"	Akiko Ueda	Naoyuki Miura	June 1, 2019
8	"Don't Stop Me Now"	Makoto Bonkobara	Naoyuki Miura	June 8, 2019

=== Manga ===
To accompany the 2019 television drama series adaptation, a manga adaptation written and illustrated by Akira Hirahara was published under the title of the original novel. It is serialized digitally on ComicWalker from February 1, 2019, to March 3, 2020. The chapters were later released in three bound volumes by Kadokawa under the Bridge Comics imprint.

No.	Japanese release date	Japanese ISBN
1	May 2, 2019	978-4-04-065717-2
2	November 8, 2019	978-4-04-064147-8
3	March 6, 2020	978-4-04-064508-7

=== Film ===
A live-action television drama series adaptation titled Kanojo ga Suki na Mono wa (彼女が好きなものは; lit. "What She Likes Are") was announced on March 6, 2021, with Fūju Kamio starring as Jun Andō. Additional cast members include Anna Yamada as Sae Miura, Ōshirō Maeda as Ryōhei Takaoka, Ryōta Miura as Yūsuke Ono, and Akana Ikeda as Kurumi Imamiya. Tsubasa Imai was later cast as Makoto, Hayato Isomura as Mr. Fahrenheit, Daichi Watanabe as Hayato Kondō, Tōko Miura as Nao Sakura, and Sayaka Yamaguchi as Mizuki Andō (Jun's mother). The film is slated for a Q4 2021 release.

== Reception ==
=== Novel ===
Nao Kawamoto from Da Vinci described the novel as "heart-wrenching" and "fresh", praising the realistic depictions of gay people in characters such as Jun, Makoto, and Mr. Fahrenheit. He stated that because the novel is centered on people with incompatible attributes coming to an understanding, namely with Jun's sexuality and Miura's interest in yaoi, it can be enjoyed by people who are not sexual minorities as well.

=== Television series ===
Miho Suzuki from the Mainichi Shimbun noted that Fujoshi, Ukkari Gay ni Kokuru followed a wave of LGBT television series broadcasting after the popularity of Ossan's Love and What Did You Eat Yesterday? Jin Kitamura from ITMedia reviewed the series favorably, but he also criticized how Mr. Fahrenheit and his boyfriend having HIV/AIDS used negative stereotypes of the disease and gay people. In an audience survey held by the magazine Confidence, Daichi Kaneko and Ryōko Fujino's acting received praise. The show won the Galaxy Award Monthly Award in July 2019. During the 16th Confidence Award Drama Prize, Kaneko won the Newcomer Award. At the same event, Fujino was also awarded for Best Supporting Actress and Naoyuki Miura was awarded for Best Script.
