= Nagasaki: Memories of My Son =

2015 film

- Film poster
- Directed by: Yoji Yamada
- Written by: Yoji Yamada; Emiko Hiramatsu
- Produced by: Enoki Nozomi
- Starring: Sayuri Yoshinaga; Kazunari Ninomiya
- Cinematography: Masashi Chikamori
- Edited by: Iwao Ishii
- Music by: Ryuichi Sakamoto
- Distributed by: Shochiku
- Release date: 12 December 2015 (Japan)
- Running time: 130 minutes
- Country: Japan
- Language: Japanese
- Box office: ¥1,720,074,869 ($14,484,841)

Nagasaki: Memories of My Son (Japanese: 母と暮せば, Hepburn: Haha to Kuraseba; lit. "Living with my Mother") is a 2015 Japanese drama film directed by Yoji Yamada and starring Sayuri Yoshinaga and Kazunari Ninomiya. It was selected as the Japanese entry for the Best Foreign Language Film at the 89th Academy Awards but it was not nominated.

== Plot ==
Midwife Nobuko Fukuhara lost her husband and eldest son during World War II and lost her youngest son, Koji, as a result of the bombing of Nagasaki. Following the war, she has been living alone with only work to keep her occupied. However, one day she is visited by an apparition of Koji. The mother and son begin to spend much time together, reminiscing and catching up on lost time. Although these moments together make both of them happy, it leads Nobuko to reflect more on her losses and the relationship she has with Koji's fiancée Machiko.

== Cast ==
- Sayuri Yoshinaga as Nobuko Fukuhara
- Kazunari Ninomiya as Koji Fukuhara
- Haru Kuroki as Machiko Sata
- Kenichi Kato as "Shanghai Uncle"
- Tadanobu Asano as Kuroda
- Yuriko Hirooka as Tomie
- Miyu Honda as Tamiko
- Christopher McCombs as Charles Sweeney
- Nenji Kobayashi as Demobilized Officer
- Kazunaga Tsuji as Senior Man
- Isao Hashizume as Kawakami Professor

== Production ==
=== Filming ===
Principal photography began on 26 April 2015 in Nagasaki and was completed on 11 July 2015.

=== Music ===
The musical score for Nagasaki was composed by Ryuichi Sakamoto. A soundtrack album was released by Milan Records on 23 September 2016.

== Reception ==
=== Box office ===
Nagasaki: Memories of My Son grossed ¥1.98 billion in Japan.

=== Accolades ===
Year	Award	Category	Recipient	Result	Ref.
2016	89th Kinema Junpo Award	Best 10 Films	Nagasaki: Memories of My Son	9th Place	
2016	89th Kinema Junpo Award	Best Actor	Kazunari Ninomiya	Won	
2016	89th Kinema Junpo Award	Best Supporting Actress	Haru Kuroki	Won	
2016	39th Japan Academy Prize	Picture of the Year	Nagasaki: Memories of My Son	Nominated	
2016	39th Japan Academy Prize	Screenplay of the Year	Yoji Yamada and Emiko Hiramatsu	Nominated	
2016	39th Japan Academy Prize	Best Actor in a Leading Role	Kazunari Ninomiya	Won	
2016	39th Japan Academy Prize	Best Actress in a Leading Role	Sayuri Yoshinaga	Nominated	
2016	39th Japan Academy Prize	Best Actor in a Supporting Role	Tadanobu Asano	Nominated	
2016	39th Japan Academy Prize	Best Actress in a Supporting Role	Haru Kuroki	Won	
2016	39th Japan Academy Prize	Best Cinematography	Masashi Chikamori	Nominated	
2016	39th Japan Academy Prize	Best Lighting Direction	Kōichi Watanabe	Nominated	
2016	39th Japan Academy Prize	Best Art Direction	Mitsuo Degawa	Nominated	
2016	39th Japan Academy Prize	Best Sound Recording	Kazumi Kishida	Nominated	
2016	39th Japan Academy Prize	Best Film Editing	Iwao Ishii	Nominated	
2016	70th Mainichi Film Awards	Best Supporting Actor	Kenichi Kato	Won	
2016	70th Mainichi Film Awards	Best Film Score	Ryuichi Sakamoto	Won	
2016	41st Hochi Film Award	Best Picture	Nagasaki: Memories of My Son	Nominated	
2016	41st Hochi Film Award	Best Director	Yoji Yamada	Nominated	
2016	41st Hochi Film Award	Best Actor	Kazunari Ninomiya	Nominated	
2016	41st Hochi Film Award	Best Actress	Sayuri Yoshinaga	Nominated	
2016	41st Hochi Film Award	Best Supporting Actor	Kenichi Kato	Nominated	
2016	41st Hochi Film Award	Best Supporting Actress	Haru Kuroki	Nominated	

== See also ==
- Cinema of Japan
- List of submissions to the 89th Academy Awards for Best Foreign Language Film
- List of Japanese submissions for the Academy Award for Best Foreign Language Film
