= Suzuka Ohgo =

Japanese actress (born 1993)

- Born: 5 August 1993 (age 32); Zama, Kanagawa, Japan
- Occupation: Actress
- Years active: 2000–present

Suzuka Ohgo (Japanese: 大後 寿々花, Hepburn: Ōgo Suzuka; born 5 August 1993) is a Japanese actress.

== Biography ==
Ohgo was born in Zama, Kanagawa. She began acting in 2000 when she was seven, then joined Sunflower (Himawari), a theatrical company. She debuted with the company at the Meiji-za in Story of a National Thief.

In early 2005, Ohgo debuted in her first major film, Kita No Zeronen (北の零年; a.k.a. Year One in the North), directed by Isao Yukisada, with Ken Watanabe, where she played the role of Tae Komatsubara. In December 2005, she debuted in Hollywood with Memoirs of a Geisha, directed by Rob Marshall, where she played Sakamoto Chiyo, the child version of the main protagonist Nitta Sayuri (the adult version is played by Chinese actress Zhang Ziyi). During the same year, she also won the Japan Film Critics Award for Best Newcomer.

In 2006, Ohgo also starred in Baruto no Gakuen (バルトの楽園; a.k.a. Symphony of Joy), which was released in June 2006 and is set during World War I, where she plays a girl of mixed German-Japanese heritage trying to find her German father who may be held there.

In 2008, she began lending her voice to anime in Michiko to Hatchin as Hana Morenos (AKA: "Hatchin"). She also provided the voice of Katia Andersen in Professor Layton and the Diabolical Box.

She worked at CATARMAN until 2013.

== Filmography ==
=== Film ===
Year	Title	Role	Notes	Ref.
2003	Ultraman Cosmos vs. Ultraman Justice: The Final Battle			
2005	Memoirs of a Geisha	Chiyo (young)	American film	
2005	Year One in the North	Tae (young)		
2009	Oppai Volleyball	Mikako (young)		
2012	The Kirishima Thing	Aya Sawajima		
2024	The Women in the Lakes	Azusa Ono		
2024	Ghosts Dream Selfish Dreams	Miho Kikuchi		
2025	Bullet Train Explosion	Sakura Ichikawa		
2026	Tsuki no Inu			
2026	The Hikikomori Extraction			

=== Television drama ===
Year	Title	Role	Notes	Ref.
2018	Tokyo Alien Bros.	Haruru		

=== Television animation ===
Year	Title	Role	Notes	Ref.
2008	Michiko & Hatchin	Hannah "Hatchin" Morenos	Lead role	

=== Video games ===
Year	Title	Role	Notes	Ref.
2007	Professor Layton and the Diabolical Box	Katia Anderson		
