= Tokyo Playboy Club =

- Directed by: Yosuke Okuda
- Written by: Yosuke Okuda
- Produced by: Naoki Kai
- Starring: Nao Ōmori; Ken Mitsuishi; Asami Usuda
- Cinematography: Takahiro Imai
- Release date: February 4, 2012 (Japan)
- Running time: 96 minutes
- Country: Japan
- Language: Japanese

Tokyo Playboy Club (東京プレイボーイクラブ) is a 2012 Japanese film directed by Yosuke Okuda.

== Synopsis ==
A stoic drifter (Nao Omori) hiding out at his friend's nightclub in Tokyo after blunt manslaughter.

== Cast ==
- Nao Ōmori as Katsutoshi
- Ken Mitsuishi as Seikichi
- Asami Usuda as Eriko
- Masaaki Akahori as Takeo
- Takahiro Miura as Umezo
- Yasushi Fuchikami as Takahiro
