= Solomon's Perjury =

- Poster
- ソロモンの偽証
- Directed by: Izuru Narushima
- Based on: Solomon's Perjury by Miyuki Miyabe
- Production company: Shochiku
- Release dates: March 7, 2015 (Part 1); April 11, 2015 (Part 2)
- Running time: 121 minutes (Part 1); 146 minutes (Part 2)
- Country: Japan
- Language: Japanese
- Box office: ¥120.1 million (Part 1, Japan)

Solomon's Perjury (Japanese: ソロモンの偽証) is a two-part 2015 Japanese suspense mystery film directed by Izuru Narushima, based on the novel of the same title by Miyuki Miyabe. The first, Solomon's Perjury Part 1: Suspicion (Japanese: ソロモンの偽証 前篇・事件), was released on March 7 and the second, Solomon's Perjury Part 2: Judgement (Japanese: ソロモンの偽証 後篇・裁判), was released on April 11, 2015.

== Cast ==
- Ryōko Fujino as Ryōko Fujino
- Mizuki Itagaki
- Anna Ishii
- Hiroya Shimizu
- Miu Tomita
- Kōki Maeda (Maeda Maeda's older brother)
- Haru Kuroki
- Machiko Ono
- Hiromi Nagasaku
- Kuranosuke Sasaki
- Yui Natsukawa
- Fumiyo Kohinata

== Reception ==
Part 1 earned ¥120.128 million on its opening weekend in Japan.

Derek Elley of Film Business Asia gave both films an 8 out of 10, saying that the first "fans out in involving ways" and that the second "wraps in a challenging and satisfying way." The films won the 2015 Hochi Film Award for Best Picture.

== Accolades ==
Accolades received by Solomon's Perjury
Award	Year	Category	Recipient(s)	Result	Ref.
Asian Film Awards	2016	Best Newcomer	Ryōko Fujino	Nominated	
Blue Ribbon Awards	2015	Best Newcomer	Anna Ishii	Won	
Hochi Film Award	2015	Best Film	Solomon's Perjury	Won	
Hochi Film Award	2015	Best New Artist	Ryōko Fujino	Won	
Japan Academy Film Prize	2016	Outstanding Achievement in Music	Gorō Yasukawa	Nominated	
Japan Academy Film Prize	2016	Outstanding Achievement in Cinematography	Masakazu Fujisawa	Nominated	
Japan Academy Film Prize	2016	Outstanding Achievement in Lighting Direction	Masao Kanazawa	Nominated	
Japan Academy Film Prize	2016	Newcomer of the Year	Ryōko Fujino	Won	
Japanese Movie Critics Awards	2015	Best Picture	Solomon's Perjury	Won	
Japanese Movie Critics Awards	2015	Best Screenplay	Katsuhiko Manabe	Won	
Japanese Movie Critics Awards	2015	Best New Actor	Mizuki Itagaki	Won	
Japanese Movie Critics Awards	2015	Best New Actress	Ryōko Fujino	Won	
Mainichi Film Awards	2015	Best Cinematography	Masakazu Fujisawa	Won	
Nikkan Sports Film Award	2015	Best Film	Solomon's Perjury	Won	
Yokohama Film Festival	2016	Best Newcomer	Ryōko Fujino	Won	
