= Haruka Ayase =

Japanese actress (born 1985)

- 綾瀬 はるか
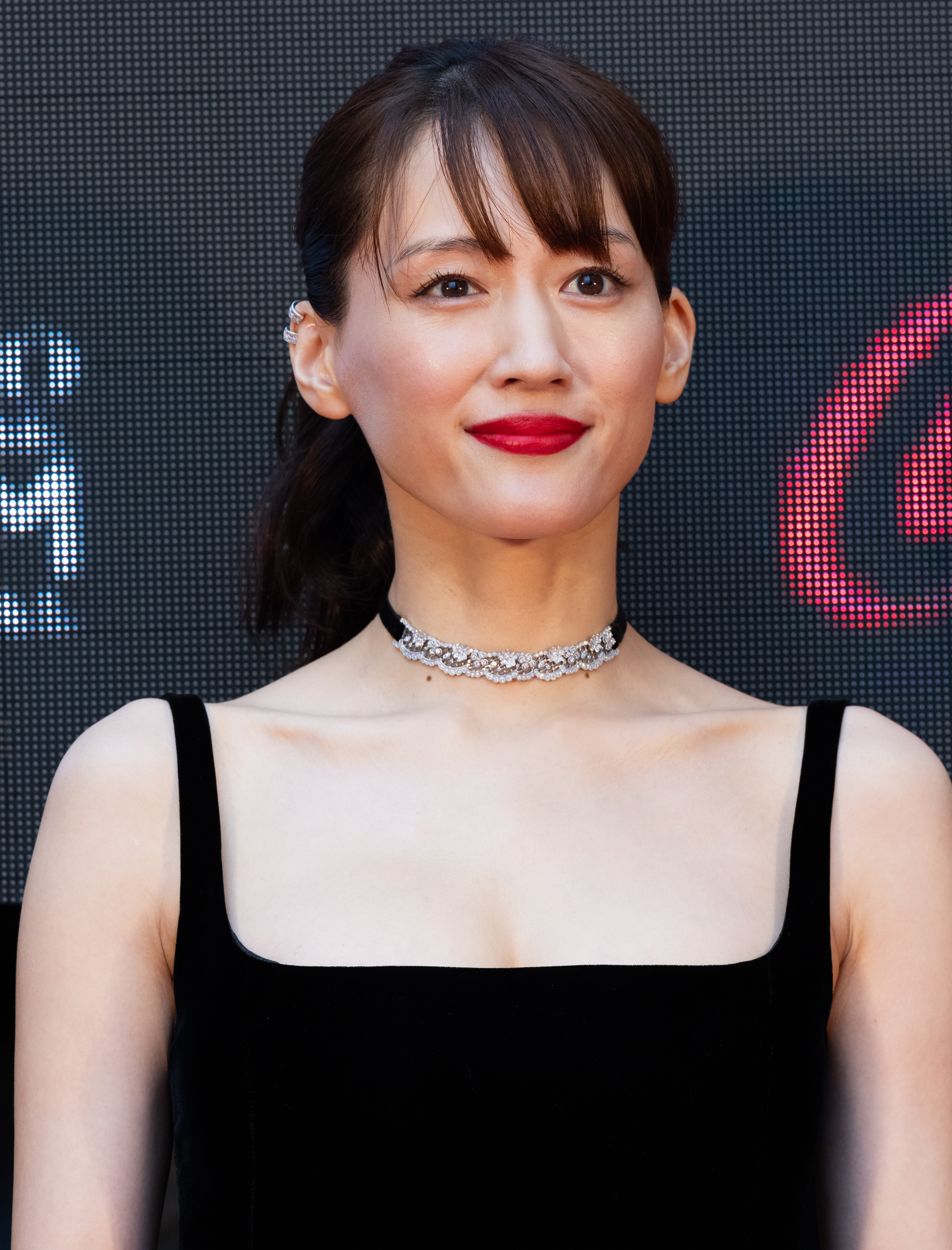
- Ayase at the 37th Tokyo International Film Festival in 2024
- Born: Aya Tademaru; March 24, 1985 (age 41); Hiroshima, Japan
- Education: Teikyo University Junior College
- Occupations: Actress; Gravure model
- Years active: 2000–present
- Height: 1.66 m (5 ft 5 1/2 in)

Aya Tademaru (Japanese: 蓼丸 綾, Hepburn: Tademaru Aya; born March 24, 1985) better known by the stage name Haruka Ayase (綾瀬 はるか), is a Japanese actress who started her career as a model in the year 2000. She has since become a leading actress in television and film. The Japan Times has referred to Ayase as "the Japanese version of Anne Hathaway". In 2018, she was named the most beautiful face in Japan.

== Career ==
=== 2000–2004: Early career ===
Ayase was invited by a friend to participate in the 25th Horipro Talent Scout Caravan. She was interested as "an excuse to not attend club activities", but had nothing prepared, so she did a rabbit imitation that was popular at school. She won the Special Jury Prize, and made her debut in the entertainment world in 2000.

Her stage name was taken from the internet, with Ayase and herself choosing it from 16,000 applicants; on February 28, 2001, it was decided as "Haruka Ayase".

In addition to photo collections and weekly magazines, her popularity as a gravure idol increased with appearances on local programs such as Cosmo Angel. Her pictorial activities decreased as she began to receive attention as an actress.

Ayase made her acting debut in 2001 in part 3 of Kindaichi Shōnen no Jikenbo starring Jun Matsumoto.

In 2003, she made her first regular appearance in the serial drama Boku no Ikiru Michi.

She was selected as a cast member of Socrates in Love in 2004, for which she won Best Supporting Actress at the 42nd Television Drama Academy Awards for her portrayal of Aki Hirose, a high schooler with leukemia. Ayase shaved her hair and changed her weight in order to match Masami Nagasawa's portrayal of the character in the film.

=== 2005–2014: Singing debut ～ Yae's Sakura ===
On March 24, 2006, Ayase made her debut as a singer with the single "Period", produced by Takeshi Kobayashi. The single debuted 8th on the Oricon charts.

In 2007, she starred in the television drama Hotaru no Hikari, an adaptation of the manga of the same name, with Naohito Fujiki. A sequel was broadcast in 2010, and the movie was released in 2012.

Ayase made her first appearance in an NHK taiga drama with Yae's Sakura, which focuses on Niijima Yae, a warrior, educator, scholar, and nurse of the late Edo period. In 2014, the series was nominated for the International Emmy Award for Best Drama Series.

After completing this work, she considered retiring. However, she reconsidered her career and decided that "taiga drama is only a stepping stone."

=== 2015–present: Our Little Sister ～ My Ex-Boyfriend's Last Will ===
In 2015, Ayase starred in Hirokazu Kore-eda's film Our Little Sister alongside Masami Nagasawa, Kaho, and Suzu Hirose. The film premiered at the 2015 Cannes Film Festival. It was subsequently released in Japan on June 13, 2015 and premiered in London, England, on October 14, 2015, as part of the BFI London Film Festival.

In 2016, Ayase starred as Balsa, a spear wielder and bodyguard, in Guardian of the Spirit, an NHK taiga drama. The role involved stage combat. She starred in all three seasons of the drama.

In 2022, she made her "Monday 9" debut, starring in My Ex-Boyfriend's Last Will. This was her first Fuji TV serial drama since Shikaotoko Awoniyoshi around 14 years prior.

In September 2025, Ayase reunited with director Kore-eda for the science fiction film Sheep in the Box.

== Personal life ==
Haruka Ayase was born as Aya Tademaru on March 24, 1985, in Hiroshima Prefecture. Ayase has one elder brother. Her grandparents are survivors of the atomic bombings of Hiroshima and Nagasaki.

=== Health ===
While filming for Cyborg She, Ayase broke her nose.

On August 31, 2021, Ayase announced on Twitter and Instagram that she had contracted the COVID-19 Delta variant. Though she was originally recovering at home, she was hospitalized after symptoms of pneumonia.

== Legal troubles ==
In 2006, Ayase was detained in New Zealand after being mistaken for a spy.

Around the spring of 2020, Ayase's personal office, a company managed by her mother, invested around ¥100,000,000 (equivalent to about ¥108,700,000 in 2024) in a scheme co-managed by a Hiroshima tax accountant who was a long-time acquaintance of the Ayase family. The scheme defaulted on repayments to Ayase's company in May 2021, and the accountant's son arranged for a full refund of the investment. The accountant and three others were arrested for investment law violations in November 2022. Other investors alleged that the accountant used his relationship with Ayase to solicit investments in the scheme.

== Other ventures ==
=== Endorsements ===
Ayase is a popular product spokesperson in Japan, appearing in commercials for major consumer brands such as Coca-Cola, SK-II, and KFC. She is also the main spokeswoman for Uniqlo and SK-II in Japan.

=== Philanthropy ===
In March 2011, she launched the awareness for raising about the Tohoku earthquake and tsunami and the subsequent Fukushima nuclear disaster and invited Japanese and international celebrities to add their videos for triple tragedy in Japan. Despite Fukushima crisis, she made a call to action to support the victims of triple disaster and to raise funds in the relief effort. In conjunction, she has also created her own website for the cause.

== Filmography ==
=== Television ===
| Year | Title | Role | Notes | Ref. |
|---|---|---|---|---|
| 2001 | The Kindaichi Case Files | Tomoko Ninomiya | Episode 7 | |
| 2001 | Cosmo Angel | Haruka | | |
| 2002 | Kaze no Bon kara | Aki Sugimura | | |
| 2003 | Hontō ni Atta Kowai Hanashi | Misaki Onose | | |
| 2003 | Boku no Ikiru Michi | Megumi Sugita | | |
| 2003 | Blackjack ni Yoroshiku | Risako Tsubaki | | |
| 2003 | Otoko Yu | Mina Matsuura | | |
| 2003 | Taikoki | Shino | TV movie | |
| 2004 | Kōfuku no Ōji | Mayu Mitsuishi | | |
| 2004 | True Horror Stories | Chisato Nakamura | | |
| 2004 | Kyokugensuiri Colosseum | Ami Shinozaki | | |
| 2004 | Fuyuzora ni Tsuki wa Kagayaku | Hanako Imamiya | TV movie | |
| 2004 | It Was Sudden, Like a Storm... | Saho Makino | | |
| 2004 | Crying Out Love in the Center of the World | Aki Hirose | Lead role | |
| 2004 | Charming | Michiru Majiba | | |
| 2005 | Red Fate | Naoko Shimazaki | Lead role; miniseries | |
| 2006 | Satomi Hakkenden | Hamaji | TV movie | |
| 2006 | Hero | Ririko Izumitani | TV movie | |
| 2006 | Journey Under the Midnight Sun | Yukiho Karasawa | | |
| 2006 | Love of My Life | Nao Tsukioka | | |
| 2007–2010 | Hotaru no Hikari: It's Only A Little Light In My Life | Hotaru Amemiya | Lead role; 2 seasons | |
| 2008 | The Fantastic Deer-Man | Michiko Fujiwara | | |
| 2008 | Rookies | Kyoko Mikoshiba | Episode 8; cameo | |
| 2009 | Kurobe no Taiyō | Sachie Takiyama | TV movie | |
| 2009 | Mr. Brain | Kazune Yuri | | |
| 2009–2011 | Jin | Saki Tachibana | 2 seasons | |
| 2011 | Antarctica | Miyuki | | |
| 2013 | Yae's Sakura | Niijima Yae | Lead role; Taiga drama | |
| 2014 | I'm Taking the Day Off | Hanae Aonishi | Lead role | |
| 2016–2018 | Moribito: Guardian of the Spirit | Balsa | Lead role; 3 seasons | |
| 2016 | Never Let Me Go | Kyoko Hoshina | Lead role | |
| 2017 | Caution, Hazardous Wife | Nami Isayama | Lead role | |
| 2018 | Stepmom and Daughter Blues | Akiko Iwaki | Lead role | |
| 2019 | Idaten | Suya Haruno | Taiga drama | |
| 2020 | Stepmom and Daughter Blues 2020 Happy New Year Special | Akiko Miyamoto | Lead role; TV movie | |
| 2021 | Anata no Soba de Ashita ga Warau | Ao Mashiro | Lead role; TV movie | |
| 2021 | Heaven and Hell: Soul Exchange | Ayako Mochizuki | Lead role | |
| 2022 | Stepmom and Daughter Blues 2022 Happy New Year Special | Akiko Miyamoto | Lead role; TV movie | |
| 2022 | My Ex-Boyfriend's Last Will | Reiko Kenmochi | Lead role | |
| 2024 | Stepmom and Daughter Blues Final (2024 Happy New Year Special) | Akiko Miyamoto | Lead role; TV movie | |
| 2025 | Unbound | Kurosuke Inari / narrator | Taiga drama | |
| 2025 | I Want to Die Alone | Narumi Yamaguchi | Lead role | |

=== Film ===
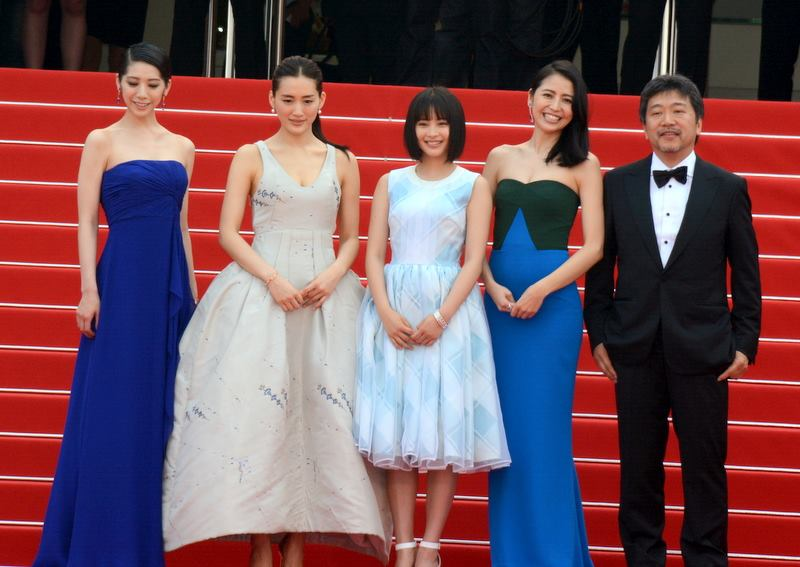
Ayase during the premiere of Our Little Sister at the Cannes Film Festival in May 2015

| Year | Title | Role | Notes | Ref. |
|---|---|---|---|---|
| 2002 | Justice | Hoshi | Jam Films | |
| 2004 | River of First Love | Sayuri Takakura | Lead role | |
| 2005 | New Horizon | Sayako | Jam Films S | |
| 2005 | Samurai Commando: Mission 1549 | Nōhime | | |
| 2006 | Taberuki shinai | Nao | Lead role | |
| 2007 | Hero | Ririko Izumitani | | |
| 2008 | Cyborg She | The Girlfriend | Lead role | |
| 2008 | Ichi | Ichi | Lead role | |
| 2008 | The Magic Hour | Natsuko Shikama | | |
| 2008 | Happy Flight | Etsuko Saitō | Lead role | |
| 2009 | Oppai Volleyball | Mikako Terashima | Lead role | |
| 2009 | Rookies | Kyoko Mikoshiba | Special appearance | |
| 2009 | Oblivion Island: Haruka and the Magic Mirror | Haruka (voice) | Lead role | |
| 2010 | The Incite Mill | Shoko Suwana | | |
| 2011 | Princess Toyotomi | Tadako Torii | | |
| 2012 | Hotaru The Movie: It's Only a Little Light in My Life | Hotaru Amemiya | Lead role | |
| 2012 | Akko's Secret | Akko | Lead role | |
| 2012 | Dearest | Naoko | | |
| 2013 | Real | Atsumi | Lead role | |
| 2014 | All-Round Appraiser Q: The Eyes of Mona Lisa | Riko Rinda | Lead role | |
| 2015 | Our Little Sister | Sachi Kōda | Lead role | |
| 2015 | Galaxy Turnpike | Noe | | |
| 2016 | The Kodai Family | Kie Hirano | Lead role | |
| 2016 | Fueled: The Man They Called Pirate | Yuki | | |
| 2017 | Honnōji Hotel | Mayuko | Lead role | |
| 2018 | Color Me True | Miyuki | Lead role | |
| 2021 | Caution, Hazardous Wife: The Movie | Nami Isayama | Lead role | |
| 2022 | Yes, I Can't Swim | Shizuka Usuhara | | |
| 2023 | The Legend and Butterfly | Nōhime | | |
| 2023 | Revolver Lily | Yuri Ozone | Lead role | |
| 2024 | Route 29 | Tombo | Lead role | |
| 2026 | Sheep in the Box | Otone Komoto | Lead role | |
| 2026 | One Last Love Letter | Nazuna Terada | Lead role | |
| 2026 | First Voice | Michiko Asahi | Lead role | |

=== Japanese dub ===
| Year | Title | Role | Notes | Ref. |
|---|---|---|---|---|
| 2004 | The Incredibles | Violet Parr | | |
| 2018 | Incredibles 2 | Violet Parr | | |
| 2025 | The Wild Robot | Roz | | |

=== Television documentary ===
- Haruka Ayase Listen to War Experience (TBS, 2010–present)

=== Others ===
- 47th Japan Record Awards (TBS, 2005), host
- Kōhaku Uta Gassen (NHK)
  - 63rd (2012), a judge
  - 64th (2013), the red team captain
  - 66th (2015), the red team captain
  - 70th (2019), the red team captain
  - 76th (2025), a host

== Discography ==
=== Singles ===
| Year | Single | Chart position | Album | Total sales |
|---|---|---|---|---|
| 2006 | "Period" (ピリオド, Piriodo) | 8 | | 28,224 |
| 2006 | "Kōsaten Days" (交差点days) | 8 | | 18,688 |
| 2007 | "Hikōkigumo" (飛行機雲) | 23 | | 10,352 |
| 2010 | "Māgaretto" (マーガレット) | 20 | | |

== Awards and nominations ==
| Year | Award | Category | Nominated work(s) | Result | Ref. |
|---|---|---|---|---|---|
| 2007 | The 31st Elan d'or Awards | Newcomer of the Year | Herself | Won | |
| 2008 | The 21st Nikkan Sports Film Awards | Best Actress | Cyborg She, Ichi, Happy Flight | Won | |
| 2009 | The 18th Hashida Awards | Best Newcomer | Jin | Won | |
| 2009 | The 52nd Blue Ribbon Awards | Best Actress | Oppai Volleyball | Won | |
| 2009 | The 33rd Japan Academy Film Prize | Best Actress | Oppai Volleyball | Nominated | |
| 2015 | The 18th Nikkan Sports Drama Grand Prix | Best Actress | I'm Taking the Day Off | Won | |
| 2015 | The 37th Yokohama Film Festival | Best Actress | Our Little Sister | Won | |
| 2015 | The 28th Nikkan Sports Film Awards | Best Actress | Our Little Sister | Won | |
| 2016 | The 58th Blue Ribbon Awards | Best Actress | Our Little Sister | Nominated | |
| 2016 | The 70th Mainichi Film Awards | Best Actress | Our Little Sister | Won | |
| 2016 | The 39th Japan Academy Film Prize | Best Actress | Our Little Sister | Nominated | |
| 2016 | The 10th Asian Film Awards | Best Actress | Our Little Sister | Nominated | |
| 2019 | The 22nd Nikkan Sports Drama Grand Prix | Best Actress | Stepmom and Daughter Blues | Won | |
| 2021 | The 24th Nikkan Sports Drama Grand Prix | Best Actress | Heaven and Hell: Soul Exchange | Won | |
| 2021 | The 14th Tokyo Drama Awards | Best Actress | Heaven and Hell: Soul Exchange | Won | |
| 2023 | The 48th Hochi Film Awards | Best Actress | The Legend and Butterfly and Revolver Lily | Won | |
| 2024 | The 66th Blue Ribbon Awards | Best Actress | Revolver Lily | Nominated | |
| 2024 | The 47th Japan Academy Film Prize | Best Actress | Revolver Lily | Nominated | |
| 2026 | The 39th Nikkan Sports Film Awards | Best Actress | One Last Love Letter and Sheep in the Box | Pending | |
