= Takuya Ishida =

Japanese actor (born 1987)

- Born: 10 February 1987 (age 39); Kitanagoya, Aichi, Japan
- Years active: 2005–present
- Website: http://www.from1-pro.jp/talent/IshidaTakuya.html

Takuya Ishida (石田 卓也, Ishida Takuya; born 10 February 1987) is a Japanese actor.

== Career ==
When Ishida was fifteen, he auditioned in the Junon Superboy Contest for New Actors and won the Photogenic Award. Acting agencies began expressing interest in Ishida as an actor, who eventually accepted an offer from the company First Production. After making his film debut, he won the Kinema Junpo Newcomer Award in 2005.

== Work ==
=== TV drama ===
- The Gate of Youth·Chapter of Chikuho (TBS,21–22 March 2005) as Shisuke Ibuki
- Koisuru Nichiyoubi (BS-TBS, 25 December 2005) as Yoshimura Huziyoshi
- Gachibaka! (TBS, January to March 2006) as Hukada Hiroyuki
- Tokyo Girl, episode 2 (BS-TBS, 6 August 2006) as Yuichi
- Broccoli (Fuji Television, 20 January 2007) as Ichikawa Keita
- Voice, episode 6 (Fuji Television, 20 February 2009) as Souma Taijin
- Emergency Room 24hours – Series 4 (Fuji Television, 11 August-22 September 2009) as Kudou Ryousuke (Trainee doctor)
- Sayonaraga Ie Nakute (Asahi Broadcasting Corporation, 18 September 2009) as Nagashima Kouji
- Fumou Chitai Episode 3,5,6,13(Fuji Television, 15 October 2009 – 11 March 2010) as Samejima Rondon
- Emergency Room 24hours – Series 2010 Special (Fuji Television, 3 January 2010) as Kudou Ryousuke (Trainee doctor)
- Kamakura Kashi Torimono Hikae (NHK, 12 June 2010) as Kyotaro

=== Film ===
- The Samurai I Loved (2005) as Makibun Shirou (young)
- Rough (2006) as Ogata Tsuyoshi
- Night Time Picnic (2006) as Nishiwaki Yuu (leading actor)
- Kitokito! (2007) as Saitou Yuusuke (lead actor)
- Out of the Wind (2007) as Yan Suiru
- Gumi. Chocolate. Pine (2007) as Oohashi Kenzou (lead actor)
- Tokyo Boy (2008) as Karasawa Shuu
- The Chasing World (2008) as Satou Tsubasa (lead actor)
- Ame no Tsubasa (2008) as Matsumae Yousuke
- Sweet Rain (2008) as Akutsu Shinji
- Boku tachi to chuzai san no 700 nichi senso (2008) as Saijou
- R246 Story (2008) as Maeda Juri
- GS Wonderland (2008) as Kikawa Masao
- Crime or Punishment?!? (2009) as Miyashita
- Girl with Frigidity in Tokyo (2009) as Hide
- Oppai Volleyball (2009) as Nakai (senior member of the volleyball club)
- Battle League Horumo (2009) as Ashiya Man
- Hana no Asuka gumi NEO! (2009) as Teru
- Dear My Love (2009) as Kitajima Susumu
- Rookies (2009) as Hamanaka Taiyou
- Castle Under Fiery Skies (2009) as Shizou
- Shin-san (2010) as Nakaoka Shin'ichi
- The Chasing World 2 (2010) as Satou Tsubasa (lead actor)
- King Game (Estimated: 2010) as Suzu (lead actor)
- Gaku: Minna no Yama ("Peak: Everyone's Mountain") (Estimated: 2011) as Akutsu
- Tokyo Tribe (2014) as Kim
- School Lunch of Ashiya City (2022) as Tatsuya Imamura
- Sin and Evil (2024) as Saku

=== Dubbing ===
- The Girl Who Leapt Through Time (animation, 2006) as Chiaki Mamiya (lead)

=== Others ===
- The Preparation for picnic (sold from 15 September 2006, a prequel DVD of Night Time Picnic) as Nishiwaki Yuu
- One Draft 1st single "Furusato" (sold from 21 March 2007) – MV appearance
- Funky Monkey Babys 7th Single "Tabidachi (Departure)" (sold from 26 March 2008) – Main cover and MV appearance

== Awards ==
- The Photogenic Award (The 15th Junon Superboy Contest for New Actors) (2002)
- Newcomer Award (The 79th Kinema Junpo Award)
- Newcomer Award (Japanese Movie Critic Grand Prize) (2005)
