= Historié =

Japanese manga series

- First tankōbon volume cover, featuring Eumenes

ヒストリエ (Hisutorie)
- Genre: Epic; Historical
- Manga
- Written by: Hitoshi Iwaaki
- Published by: Kodansha
- English publisher: Kodansha (digital); NA: Kodansha USA
- Imprint: Afternoon KC
- Magazine: Monthly Afternoon
- Original run: 25 January 2003 – present
- Volumes: 12
- Anime television series
- Studio: Liden Films
- Original run: January 2027 – scheduled
- icon

Historié (Japanese: ヒストリエ, Hepburn: Hisutorie) is a Japanese manga series written and illustrated by Hitoshi Iwaaki. It follows the story of Eumenes, a secretary and general to Alexander the Great. It has been serialized in Kodansha's seinen manga magazine Monthly Afternoon since January 2003, with its chapters collected in 12 tankōbon volumes as of June 2024. An anime television series adaptation produced by Liden Films is scheduled to premiere in January 2027.

In 2010, Historié received the Grand Prize at the 14th Japan Media Arts Festival as well as the 16th Tezuka Osamu Cultural Prize in 2012. It won the 49th Kodansha Manga Award in the general category in 2025.

== Plot ==
Set in mid-4th century BC Greece, Historié is a fictionalized account of Eumenes, a royal secretary and general under Alexander the Great. The narrative chronicles his life from childhood to adulthood. Born into a wealthy family in the city-state of Cardia, Eumenes is enslaved after being falsely accused of causing his adoptive father's death. Following his escape, he embarks on a prolonged journey where his intellect, strategic acumen, and skill in warfare bring him renown.

== Characters ==
Historié portrays many historical characters from ancient Greece and Persia.

Eumenes (エウメネス, Eumenesu)
Voiced by: Nobunaga Shimazaki
Eumenes, an intelligent youth from Cardia, suffers recurring nightmares of a woman killing soldiers. Originally a Scythian, he was adopted by Hieronymus after his family died in a Greek slave raid. Following Thrax's escape and subsequent events, Hieronymus is killed and Eumenes' heritage is revealed, resulting in his enslavement. After a failed slave mutiny and shipwreck near Paphlagonia, he washes ashore near Boa village. There, he educates villagers in Greek customs while assimilating into their community. When mercenaries from Tios attack Boa, Eumenes successfully defends it, killing their leader. He later returns to besieged Cardia, where he becomes Philip II's apprentice after demonstrating tactical knowledge.
Charon (カロン, Karon)
Voiced by: Wataru Takagi
He serves as a slave in the Hieronymus household and acts as Eumenes' personal attendant (pedagogue in the classical sense). Before Eumenes departs Cardia, he gives him an amulet belonging to Eumenes' mother. Later revelations show he was present during Eumenes' mother's death, despite previous denials, and contributed to her demise by holding the young Eumenes hostage. After these events, he relocates to Piraeus where he achieves fame and fortune.
Hieronymus (the Elder) (父ヒエロニュモス, Chichi Hieronyumosu; 'Father Hieronymus')
Voiced by: Kazuya Ichijō
Hieronymus initially appears as Eumenes' father but is later revealed to have adopted him after his subordinates slaughtered Eumenes' biological family during a slave raid. Though not directly responsible for the killings, Hieronymus led the expedition. He is presumed killed during Thrax's escape attempt, though another individual ultimately bears responsibility for his death.
Hieronymus (the Younger) (兄ヒエロニュモス, Ani Hieronyumosu; 'Brother Hieronymus')
Voiced by: Ryōta Suzuki
Hieronymus's son resents Eumenes during their childhood, envying his superior intellect and skills as well as their father's apparent favoritism. When Eumenes is enslaved, revelations suggest Hieronymus privately documented much of Eumenes' life, implying latent paternal concern.
Tolmides (トルミデス, Torumidesu)
Voiced by: Junya Enoki
A childhood companion of Eumenes who serves in Cardia's militia forces during Eumenes' return to the city.
Satura (サテュラ, Sateyura)
A villager from Boa who initially regards Eumenes with cautious interest. Their bond strengthens as Eumenes integrates into the community, becoming romantic after war nullifies her betrothal to Tios's heir. To protect Boa when Tios discovers Eumenes' role in the conflict, he severs their relationship through deception, facilitating her political marriage to Telemakos.
Perialla (ペリアラ, Periara)
Voiced by: Miki Kariya
A childhood acquaintance of Eumenes who initially displays romantic interest in him. Following his enslavement, her attitude shifts to hostility. She eventually marries the son of a local wheelmaker.
Thrax (トラクス, Torakusu)
Voiced by: Anri Katsu
A Scythian slave who recognizes Eumenes as a fellow countryman. He instigates a violent escape from Cardia, slaughtering numerous militia and civilians. During a marketplace confrontation, he spares Eumenes' life, arousing the citizens' suspicion. Mortally wounded during the uprising, he pursues Eumenes before dying. Authorities later blame him for Hieronymus the Elder's death.
Theogeiton (テオゲイトン, Teogeiton)
A moneylender who owns the enslaved Thrax, notorious for his harsh treatment of those under his control. He and his family perish when Thrax breaks free from his restraints.
Memnon (メムノン, Memunon)
A Greek mercenary commander in Persian service leads the pursuit of Aristotle. He first appears in Assos, then under Persian control, interrogating Hermias—Aristotle's father-in-law—to locate the philosopher.
Hermias (ヘルミアス, Herumiasu)
Aristotle's father-in law; a Eunuch. First seen chained up in Assus. Even under intense interrogation, he refuses to say anything about the teacher Aristotle.
Aristotle (アリストテレス, Arisutoteresu)
Voiced by: Tsuguo Mogami
A prominent philosopher pursued by the Persian Empire on espionage charges. Fleeing with his student Callisthenes and the slave Victas, he encounters Eumenes near the ruins of Troy while seeking passage across the Dardanelles. Delayed by Eumenes' unfinished boat construction, they spend the night in discussion, during which the philosopher recognizes Eumenes' intellectual aptitude. The group narrowly evades Persian forces the following day, crossing to Europe with Eumenes temporarily remaining behind as they continue toward Cardia.
Barsine (バルシネ, Barushine)
The wife of Troius's governor demonstrates notable political acumen and intellectual capability.
Philip II of Macedon (フィリッポス2世, Firipposu 2-sei)
The king of Macedonia first appears posing as Antigonus, a merchant from Perinthus seeking Hieronymus the Younger in Cardia. He encounters Eumenes outside the city gates and, impressed by his resourcefulness in gaining entry, impulsively offers him employment.
Arrhidaeus (アリダイオス, Aridaiosu)
Son of Philip II, shown as an intellectually disabled child. Eumenes gave him a toy chariot, replaced when Alexander the Great accidentally destroyed it.
Alexander the Great (アレクサンドロス, Arekusandorosu)
The son of Philip II of Macedon and half-brother of Arrhidaeus exhibits a respectful demeanor and natural leadership qualities. He displays a calm disposition and bears a distinctive snake-shaped scar. The character manifests an alternate personality named Hephaestion, who lacks this scar and demonstrates an aversion to snakes.
Olympias (オリュンピアス, Oryunpiasu)
The mother of Alexander the Great maintains close associations with male advisors while pursuing undisclosed political objectives related to her son's reign.
Eurydice (エウリュディケ, Euryudike)
A relative of Attalus who was romantically involved with Eumenes prior to her betrothal to Philip II of Macedon.
Telesilla (テレシラ, Tereshira)
Voiced by: Yūko Kaida
Initially appears as Eumenes' mother, but is later revealed to have adopted him along with Hieronymus the Elder.
Hecataeus (ヘカタイオス, Hekataiosu)
Voiced by: Satoshi Tsuruoka
A close confidante to Hieronymus the Elder. Despite recognizing Eumenes' talent, he is the one who reveals Eumenes' true heritage and ostracizes him from Cardia after Hieronymus is killed.
Nicogenes (ニコゲネス, Nikogenesu)
Voiced by: Seiyū Fujiwara
A childhood companion of Eumenes.

== Media ==
=== Manga ===
Written and illustrated by Hitoshi Iwaaki, Historié has been serialized in Kodansha's seinen manga magazine Monthly Afternoon since 25 January 2003. (Note: The series started in the March 2003 issue of the magazine, released on 25 January of the same year.) Kodansha has collected its chapters into individual tankōbon volumes. The first volume was released on 22 October 2004. In the October 2022 issue of Monthly Afternoon (released on 24 August), Iwaki announced that he would take a break to work on the production of the twelfth volume. He also commented: "I must contemplate how to ensure that the entire story undoubtedly reaches a conclusion." The twelfth volume was released on 21 June 2024.

In August 2024, Kodansha began publishing the series in English on its K Manga digital service. In July 2026, Kodansha USA announced that it had licensed the manga for print release, with the first volume set to release in Q2 2027.

==== Volumes ====
No.	Original release date	Original ISBN	English release date	English ISBN
1	22 October 2004	978-4-06-314358-4	27 April 2027 (omnibus)	979-8-88877-956-9 (omnibus)
1. "The Globe" (地球儀, Chikyūgi); 2. "Cardia, My Home (1)" (故郷カルディア・1, Furusato Karudia 1); 3. "Cardia, My Home (2)" (故郷カルディア・2, Furusato Karudia 2); 4. "Cardia, My Home (3)" (故郷カルディア・3, Furusato Karudia 3); 5. "The Library (1)" (図書室・1, Toshoshitsu 1); 6. "The Library (2)" (図書室・2, Toshoshitsu 2); 7. "The Same Dream" (同じ夢, Onaji Yume); 8. "The Scythian Way" (スキタイ流, Sukitairyū); 9. "Gymnasium Training" (体育教練, Taiiku Kyōren)
2	22 October 2004	978-4-06-314359-1	27 April 2027 (omnibus)	979-8-88877-956-9 (omnibus)
10. "Envisioning Victory" (斃すイメージ, Taosu Imēji); 11. "Footsteps" (足音, Ashioto); 12. "The Battle of Thrax (1)" (トラクスの戦い・1, Torakusu no Tatakai 1); 13. "The Battle of Thrax (2)" (トラクスの戦い・2, Torakusu no Tatakai 2); 14. "The Battle of Thrax (3)" (トラクスの戦い・3, Torakusu no Tatakai 3); 15. "A Pair of Bodies" (2つの死体, Futatsu no Shitai); 16. "Testimony" (証言, Shōgen); 17. "Another World" (別世界, Bessekai); 18. "The Library (3)" (図書室・3, Toshoshitsu 3); 19. "The Pendant" (ペンダント, Pendanto)
3	22 November 2005	978-4-06-314395-9	—	—
20. "A Buyer Appears" (買い手あらわる, Kaite Arawaru); 21. "Departure" (出向, Shukkō); 22. "Antakaios" (アンタカイオス, Antakaiosu); 23. "Argo" (アルゴ号, Arugo-gō); 24. "In Paphlagonia (1)" (パフラゴニアにて・1, Pafuragonia Nite 1); 25. "In Paphlagonia (2)" (パフラゴニアにて・2, Pafuragonia Nite 2); 26. "In Paphlagonia (3)" (パフラゴニアにて・3, Pafuragonia Nite 3); 27. "In Paphlagonia (4)" (パフラゴニアにて・4, Pafuragonia Nite 4); 28. "In Paphlagonia (5)" (パフラゴニアにて・5, Pafuragonia Nite 5); 29. "In Paphlagonia (6)" (パフラゴニアにて・6, Pafuragonia Nite 6)
4	23 July 2007	978-4-06-314460-4	—	—
30. "In Palphlagonia (7)" (パフラゴニアにて・7, Pafuragonia Nite 7); 31. "In Palphlagonia (8)" (パフラゴニアにて・8, Pafuragonia Nite 8); 32. "In Palphlagonia (9)" (パフラゴニアにて・9, Pafuragonia Nite 9); 33. "In Palphlagonia (10)" (パフラゴニアにて・10, Pafuragonia Nite 10); 34. "In Palphlagonia (11)" (パフラゴニアにて・11, Pafuragonia Nite 11); 35. "In Palphlagonia (12)" (パフラゴニアにて・12, Pafuragonia Nite 12); 36. "Odysseus" (オデュッセウス, Odyusseusu); 37. "Lesbos, and its Institute of Biology (1)" (レスボス島、生物研究所・1, Resubosu Shima, Seibutsu Kenkyūjo 1); 38. "Lesbos, and its Institute of Biology (2)" (レスボス島、生物研究所・2, Resubosu Shima, Seibutsu Kenkyūjo 2)
5	23 February 2009	978-4-06-314549-6	—	—
39. "Cardia, My Home (4)" (故郷カルディア・4, Furusato Karudia 4); 40. "Cardia, My Home (5)" (故郷カルディア・5, Furusato Karudia 5); 41. "Cardia, My Home (6)" (故郷カルディア・6, Furusato Karudia 6); 42. "Cardia, My Home (7)" (故郷カルディア・7, Furusato Karudia 7); 43. "The Cyclops" (キュクロプス, Kyukuropusu); 44. "King of the Lushes" (深酒の王, Fukazake no Ō); 45. "The House of Attalus" (アッタロスの家, Attarosu no Ie); 46. "The Great General's Son" (大将軍の息子, Daishōgun no Musuko); 47. "Study and Employment" (進学と就職, Shingaku to Shūshoku); 48. "The Prince (1)" (王子・1, Ōji 1)
6	21 May 2010	978-4-06-310662-6	—	—
49. "The Prince (2)" (王子・2, Ōji 2); 50. "The Prince (3)" (王子・3, Ōji 3); 51. "Horsemanship School (1)" (乗馬教育・1, Jōba Kyōiku 1); 52. "Horsemanship School (2)" (乗馬教育・2, Jōba Kyōiku 2); 53. "Horsemanship School (3)" (乗馬教育・3, Jōba Kyōiku 3); 54. "My Schoolmates" (ご学友たち, Gogakuyūtachi); 55. "The Waterfall" (滝, Taki); 56. "Cardiac Arrest" (心拍停止, Shinpaku Teishi); 57. "Hephaestion (1)" (ヘファイスティオン・1, Hefaisution 1)
7	22 November 2011	978-4-06-310787-6; 978-4-06-358374-8 (LE)	—	—
58. "Hephaestion (2)" (ヘファイスティオン・2, Hefaisution 2); 59. "Hephaestion (3)" (ヘファイスティオン・3, Hefaisution 3); 60. "Hephaestion (4)" (ヘファイスティオン・4, Hefaisution 4); 61. "Mieza" (ミエザ); 62. "The Chess Match (1)" (将棋で勝負・1, Shōgi de Shōbu 1); 63. "The Chess Match (2)" (将棋で勝負・2, Shōgi de Shōbu 2); 64. "Cardia, the Allied City" (同盟都市カルディア, Dōmei Toshi Karudia); 65. "The Siege of Two Cities (1)" (2都市攻略戦・1, Nitoshi Kōryakusen 1)
8	23 August 2013	978-4-06-387896-7	—	—
66. "The Siege of Two Cities (2)" (2都市攻略戦・2, Nitoshi Kōryakusen 2); 67. "The Siege of Two Cities (3)" (2都市攻略戦・3, Nitoshi Kōryakusen 3); 68. "The Siege of Two Cities (4)" (2都市攻略戦・4, Nitoshi Kōryakusen 4); 69. "The Siege of Two Cities (5)" (2都市攻略戦・5, Nitoshi Kōryakusen 5); 70. "Campaign to Scythia (1)" (スキタイ遠征・1, Sukitai Ensei 1); 71. "Campaign to Scythia (2)" (スキタイ遠征・2, Sukitai Ensei 2); 72. "Skirmish on the Return (1)" (帰途の一戦・1, Kito no Issen 1); 73. "Skirmish on the Return (2)" (帰途の一戦・2, Kito no Issen 2)
9	22 May 2015	978-4-06-387913-1	—	—
74. "The Secret Order (1)" (密命・1, Mitsumei 1); 75. "The Secret Order (2)" (密命・2, Mitsumei 2); 76. "The Secret Order (3)" (密命・3, Mitsumei 3); 77. "Melanthius (1)" (メランティオス・1, Merantiosu 1); 78. "Melanthius (2)" (メランティオス・2, Merantiosu 2); 79. "Chaeronea (1)" (カイロネイア・1, Kaironeia 1); 80. "Chaeronea (2)" (カイロネイア・2, Kaironeia 2)
10	23 March 2017	978-4-06-388210-0	—	—
81. "Chaeronea (3)" (カイロネイア・3, Kaironeia 3); 82. "Chaeronea (4)" (カイロネイア・4, Kaironeia 4); 83. "Chaeronea (5)" (カイロネイア・5, Kaironeia 5); 84. "Chaeronea (6)" (カイロネイア・6, Kaironeia 6); 85. "The King and His Left-Hand Man (1)" (王の左腕・1, Ō no Hidariude 1); 86. "The King and His Left-Hand Man (2)" (王の左腕・2, Ō no Hidariude 2); 87. "The King and His Left-Hand Man (3)" (王の左腕・3, Ō no Hidariude 3)
11	23 July 2019	978-4-06-515648-3	—	—
88. "Seat of the Soul (1)" (心の座・1, Kokoro no Za 1); 89. "Seat of the Soul (2)" (心の座・2, Kokoro no Za 2); 90. "Seat of the Soul (3)" (心の座・3, Kokoro no Za 3); 91. "Seat of the Soul (4)" (心の座・4, Kokoro no Za 4); 92. "Seat of the Soul (5)" (心の座・5, Kokoro no Za 5); 93. "Seat of the Soul (6)" (心の座・6, Kokoro no Za 6); 94. "The Housewarming (1)" (引っ越し祝・1, Hikkoshi Iwai 1); 95. "The Housewarming (2)" (引っ越し祝・2, Hikkoshi Iwai 2); 96. "The Disposal of Olympias (1)" (オリュンピアス処分・1, Oryunpiasu Shobun 1); 97. "The Disposal of Olympias (2)" (オリュンピアス処分・2, Oryunpiasu Shobun 2)
12	21 June 2024	978-4-06-535755-2	—	—
98. "Twisted" (歪, Hizumi); 99. "Fragments of Memories" (思い出の断片, Omoide no Danpen); 100. "The Night Before" (前夜, Zen'ya); 101. "Cardia, or 'Heart' (1)" (カルディア (心臓)・1, Karudia (Shinzō) 1); 102. "Cardia, or 'Heart' (2)" (カルディア (心臓)・2, Karudia (Shinzō) 2); 103. "Cardia, or 'Heart' (3)" (カルディア (心臓)・3, Karudia (Shinzō) 3); 104. "Cardia, or 'Heart' (4)" (カルディア (心臓)・4, Karudia (Shinzō) 4); 105. "Outside the Palace (1)" (王宮の外・1, Ōkyū no Soto 1); 106. "Outside the Palace (2)" (王宮の外・2, Ōkyū no Soto 2); 107. "Outside the Palace (3)" (王宮の外・3, Ōkyū no Soto 3)

=== Anime ===
An anime television series adaptation produced by Liden Films was announced on 1 January 2026. It is set to premiere in January 2027.

== Reception ==
By January 2026, Historié had over 4.7 million copies in circulation. It was a finalist for the tenth installment of Tezuka Osamu Cultural Prize in 2006, and won the Grand Prize at its 16th installment in 2012. The manga was also awarded the Grand Prize for the Manga Division in the 14th Japan Media Arts Festival in 2010. The manga won the 49th Kodansha Manga Award in the general category in 2025.

The Mainichi Shimbun newspaper called Iwaaki's vision of Eumenes' past—which, historically, is largely a mystery—"bold and unique". Manga critic and editor Jason Thompson stated that in terms of scale, ambition, and plotting, Historié is the author's masterpiece.

In her review of the first two volumes, Lynzee Loveridge of Anime News Network found the opening chapters to be weak due to their textbook-like exposition. However, she noted that the story improved once the focus shifted to Eumenes's childhood in Cardia. Loveridge praised Iwaaki's research and cast of characters but noted that the art could feel "clinical". Loveridge recommended the series to fans of historical manga.
