= Ryōko Fujino =

Japanese actress (born 2000)

- Born: February 2, 2000 (age 26); Kanagawa, Japan
- Occupation: Actress
- Years active: 2015–present
- Agent: K-Factory

Ryōko Fujino (Japanese: 藤野 涼子, Hepburn: Fujino Ryōko; born February 2, 2000) is a Japanese actress. She is known for her starring roles in the film Solomon's Perjury and the television drama Fujoshi, Ukkari Gay ni Kokuru, as well as supporting roles in the asadora Hiyokko and the taiga drama Reach Beyond the Blue Sky.

== Career ==
Fujino joined an entertainment agency in October 2011. In 2014, she was cast as the main character in Izuru Narushima's film Solomon's Perjury, an adaptation of Miyuki Miyabe's novel of the same name. She was selected out of approximately 10,000 people in an audition process that took an unprecedent six months. At the time of her debut, Fujino had only acted as an extra. She used her character's name as her stage name because she "doesn't want to forget the feelings" of receiving the role. Fujino received the Newcomer of the Year award at the 39th Japan Academy Film Prize for her role in the film. Later in 2016, she transferred agencies from Theatre Academy to K-Factory.

In May 2017, she appeared in Hiyokko as Toyoko Kanehira, a coworker and dormmate of the main character. This was her first appearance in an asadora.

During the 2019 Japanese unified local elections, Fujino appeared in posters and online advertisements by the Kanagawa Prefectural Election Commission to encourage people to vote.

== Personal life ==
Fujino was born on February 2, 2000, in Kanagawa, Japan. She is an only child.

== Filmography ==
=== Film ===
| Year | Title | Role | Notes | Ref(s) |
|---|---|---|---|---|
| 2015 | Solomon's Perjury | Ryōko Fujino | Lead role | |
| 2016 | Creepy | Mio Nishino | | |
| 2018 | Itosato: A Kyoto Courtesan at the End of Samurai Era | Itosato Tenjin | Lead role | |
| 2026 | Kyoto Hippocrates | Sagara Mine | | |
| 2027 | Ama | Nagisa Hirano | Lead role | |

=== Television ===
| Year | Title | Role | Notes | Ref(s) |
|---|---|---|---|---|
| 2017 | Hiyokko | Toyoko Kanehira | Asadora | |
| 2017 | Bridge Story: A Small Bridge | Oryō | | |
| 2019 | Ieyasu Builds Edo | Kinu | | |
| 2019 | Last Train to Nagoya | Hana Kishii | Episode 9, lead role | |
| 2019 | Fujoshi, Ukkari Gay ni Kokuru | Sae Miura | | |
| 2019 | True Scary Stories "A Look of Hatred" | Chizuru Manabe | | |
| 2019 | Midnight Diner: Tokyo Stories | Haruna | Season 2, Episode 7 | |
| 2020 | Nippori Charlies | Mie Mochizuki | | |
| 2020 | A Day-Off of Ryoma Takeuchi | Masami | | |
| 2021 | Miyako Has Come to Tokyo! | Miyako Miyano | | |
| 2021 | Air Girl | Masami Ihara | | |
| 2021 | Reach Beyond the Blue Sky | Shibusawa Tei | Taiga drama | |
| 2022 | Mentally Strong Beauty Ms. Shirakawa | Sakura Taniguchi | | |
| 2023 | My Father Is a Detective | Aimi Fukano | Episode 2 | |
| 2023 | Knockin' On Locked Door | Yuka Takahashi / Misaki Shioji | Episodes 3–5 | |
| 2024 | Tanabata no Kuni | Sachiko Higashimaru | | |

=== Music videos ===
| Year | Title | Artist | Ref(s) |
|---|---|---|---|
| 2022 | "Shimi" | Iri | |
| 2023 | "Haru ga Kuru wa" | Rin Honoka | |

== Accolades ==
| Year | Award | Category | Work(s) | Result | Ref(s) |
|---|---|---|---|---|---|
| 2015 | Hochi Film Awards | Best New Artist | Solomon's Perjury | Won | |
| 2016 | Asian Film Awards | Best Newcomer | Solomon's Perjury | Nominated | |
| 2016 | Japan Academy Film Prize | Newcomer of the Year | Solomon's Perjury | Won | |
| 2016 | Yokohama Film Festival | Best Newcomer | Solomon's Perjury | Won | |
