= Three Stories of Love =

- Theatrical release poster
- Kanji: 恋人たち
- Revised Hepburn: Koibito-tachi
- Directed by: Ryōsuke Hashiguchi
- Screenplay by: Ryōsuke Hashiguchi
- Produced by: Seigo Fukada; Hitoshi Ono; Yosuke Hirata; Satoshi Aikawa
- Starring: Atsushi Shinohara; Tōko Narushima; Ryō Ikeda; Tamae Andō; Daisuke Kuroda; Takashi Yamanaka; Chika Uchida; Sō Yamanaka; Lily Franky; Hana Kino; Ken Mitsuishi
- Cinematography: Shogo Ueno
- Edited by: Ryōsuke Hashiguchi; Hitoshi Ono
- Music by: Akeboshi
- Production companies: Shochiku Broadcasting; Arc Films
- Distributed by: Shochiku Broadcasting; Arc Films
- Release date: November 14, 2015 (Japan)
- Running time: 140 minutes
- Country: Japan
- Language: Japanese

Three Stories of Love (Japanese: 恋人たち, Hepburn: Koibito-tachi) is a 2015 Japanese drama film edited, written, and directed by Ryōsuke Hashiguchi. It was released on November 14, 2015.

== Cast ==
- Atsushi Shinohara
- Tōko Narushima
- Ryō Ikeda
- Tamae Andō
- Daisuke Kuroda
- Takashi Yamanaka
- Chika Uchida
- Sō Yamanaka
- Lily Franky
- Hana Kino
- Ken Mitsuishi

== Reception ==
Deborah Young of The Hollywood Reporter said that the movie's "sensitive filmmaking communicates the quiet desperation of real-life love."

At the 37th Yokohama Film Festival, the film was chosen as the second best Japanese film of 2015. Ryōsuke Hashiguchi won the award for Best Director and Ken Mitsuishi won the award for Best Supporting Actor.
