= Foster Daddy, Tora! =

- Theatrical release poster
- Directed by: Yoji Yamada
- Written by: Yoji Yamada; Yoshitaka Asama
- Starring: Kiyoshi Atsumi; Ran Itō
- Cinematography: Tetsuo Takaba
- Edited by: Iwao Ishii
- Music by: Naozumi Yamamoto
- Distributed by: Shochiku
- Release date: December 27, 1980
- Running time: 100 minutes
- Country: Japan
- Language: Japanese

Foster Daddy, Tora! (男はつらいよ 寅次郎かもめ歌, Otoko wa Tsurai yo: Torajirō Kamome Uta) aka Torasan's Song of the Seagull is a 1980 Japanese comedy film directed by Yoji Yamada. It stars Kiyoshi Atsumi as Torajirō Kuruma (Tora-san), and Ran Itō as his love interest or "Madonna". Foster Daddy, Tora! is the twenty-sixth entry in the popular, long-running Otoko wa Tsurai yo series.

== Synopsis ==
Tor-san takes care of the teenage daughter of a friend after he dies. He takes the girl to Tokyo where she wishes to study, and becomes worried over her romantic life.

== Cast ==
- Kiyoshi Atsumi as Torajirō
- Chieko Baisho as Sakura
- Ran Itō as Sumire
- Shimojo Masami as Kuruma Tatsuzō
- Chieko Misaki as Tsune Kuruma (Torajiro's aunt)
- Gin Maeda as Hiroshi Suwa
- Hayato Nakamura as Mitsuo Suwa
- Hisao Dazai as Boss (Umetarō Katsura)
- Gajirō Satō as Genkō
- Chishū Ryū as Gozen-sama
- Takehiro Murata as Sadao Kikuchi
- Tatsuo Matsumura as Professor Hayashi

== Critical appraisal ==
Kiyoshi Atsumi was nominated for the Best Actor prize at the Japan Academy Prize ceremony for his roles in Foster Daddy, Tora! and the following entry in the series, Tora-san's Love in Osaka (1981). Stuart Galbraith IV writes that Foster Daddy, Tora! is one of the top films in the Otoko wa Tsurai yo series, and "like the best entries, both funny and sweet". The German-language site molodezhnaja gives Foster Daddy, Tora! three and a half out of five stars.

== Availability ==
Foster Daddy, Tora! was released theatrically on December 27, 1980. In Japan, the film was released on videotape in 1996, and in DVD format in 1999, 2002, and 2008.

== Bibliography ==
=== English ===
- "OTOKO WA TSURAI YO TORAJIRO KAMOMEUTA (1980)". British Film Institute. Archived from the original on 2012-10-17.
- "OTOKO WA TSURAIYO -TORAJIRO KAMONE UTA". Complete Index to World Film.
- Galbraith IV, Stuart (2006-08-18). "Tora-san 26: Tora-san's Foster Daddy (Region 3)". DVD Talk.

=== German ===
- "Tora-San's Foster Daddy, 1980" (in German). www.molodezhnaja.ch.

=== Japanese ===
- 男はつらいよ 寅次郎かもめ歌 (1980) (in Japanese). allcinema.net.
- "男はつらいよ 寅次郎かもめ歌". Japanese Cinema Database (Agency for Cultural Affairs). Archived from the original on 2014-02-22.
- 男はつらいよ 寅次郎かもめ歌 (in Japanese). Japanese Movie Database.
- 男はつらいよ 寅次郎かもめ歌 (in Japanese). Kinema Junpo. Archived from the original on 2012-03-22.
