= Hitoshi Iwaaki =

Japanese manga artist

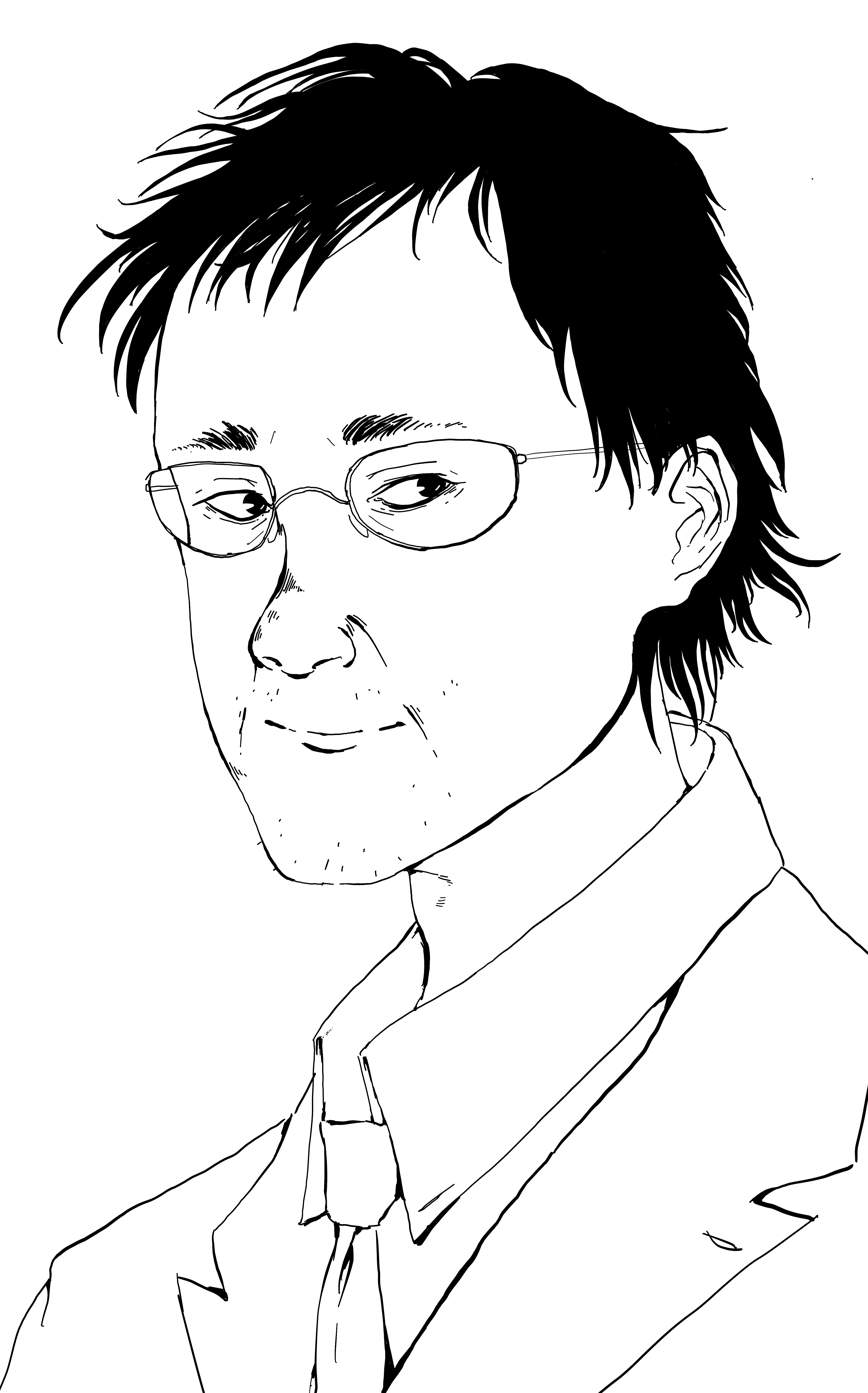
- Born: July 28, 1960 (age 66); Tokyo, Japan
- Occupation: Manga artist
- Known for: Parasyte, Historié
- Awards: Tezuka Osamu Cultural Prize - Grand Prize (2012)

Hitoshi Iwaaki (Japanese: 岩明 均, Hepburn: Iwaaki Hitoshi; born July 28, 1960) is a Japanese manga artist, whose works include the science-fiction/horror series Parasyte.

== Career ==
During high school, he was reading a lot of manga by Osamu Tezuka, which inspired him to begin drawing manga himself. He began working as an assistant for manga artist Kazuo Kamimura in 1984. In 1985, his short story "Gomi no Umi" won the newcomer award Tetsuya Chiba Award and was published in a special edition of Morning magazine. Since then, he has worked mainly for Kodansha, especially Monthly Afternoon magazine.

In 1993, Iwaaki received the Kodansha Manga Award for Parasyte. In 2010, Historié took the grand prize in the manga division of the Japan Media Arts Festival. Historié also earned him the 2012 Tezuka Osamu Cultural Prize Grand Prize. Iwaaki won the 2020 Saito Takao Award for his work on Reiri.

== Works ==
- Gomi no Umi (ゴミの海) (1985; published in Kodansha's Morning Open Zōkan)
- Fūko no Iru Mise (風子のいる店) (1986–1988; serialized in Kodansha's Morning; 4 volumes)
- Parasyte (寄生獣, Kiseijū) (1989–1994; serialized in Kodansha's Morning Open Zōkan (1989) and Monthly Afternoon (1989–1994); 10 volumes)
- Hone no Oto (骨の音) (1990; short stories collection volume published by Kodansha)
- Tanabata no Kuni (七夕の国) (1996–1999; serialized in Shogakukan's Big Comic Spirits; 4 volumes)
- Yuki no Tōge, Tsurugi no Mai (雪の峠・剣の舞) (2001; collected volume of two stories published in Kodansha's Morning Shin Magnum Zōkan (1999) and Akita Shoten's Young Champion (2000))
- Heureka (ヘウレーカ) (2001–2002; serialized in Hakusensha's Young Animal Arashi; 1 volume)
- Historié (ヒストリエ, Hisutorie) (2003–present (on hiatus since 2022); serialized in Kodansha's Monthly Afternoon; 12 volumes)
- Reiri (レイリ) (illustrated by Daisuke Muroi) (2015–2018; serialized in Akita Shoten's Bessatsu Shōnen Champion; 6 volumes)
