= Sandy Lam discography =

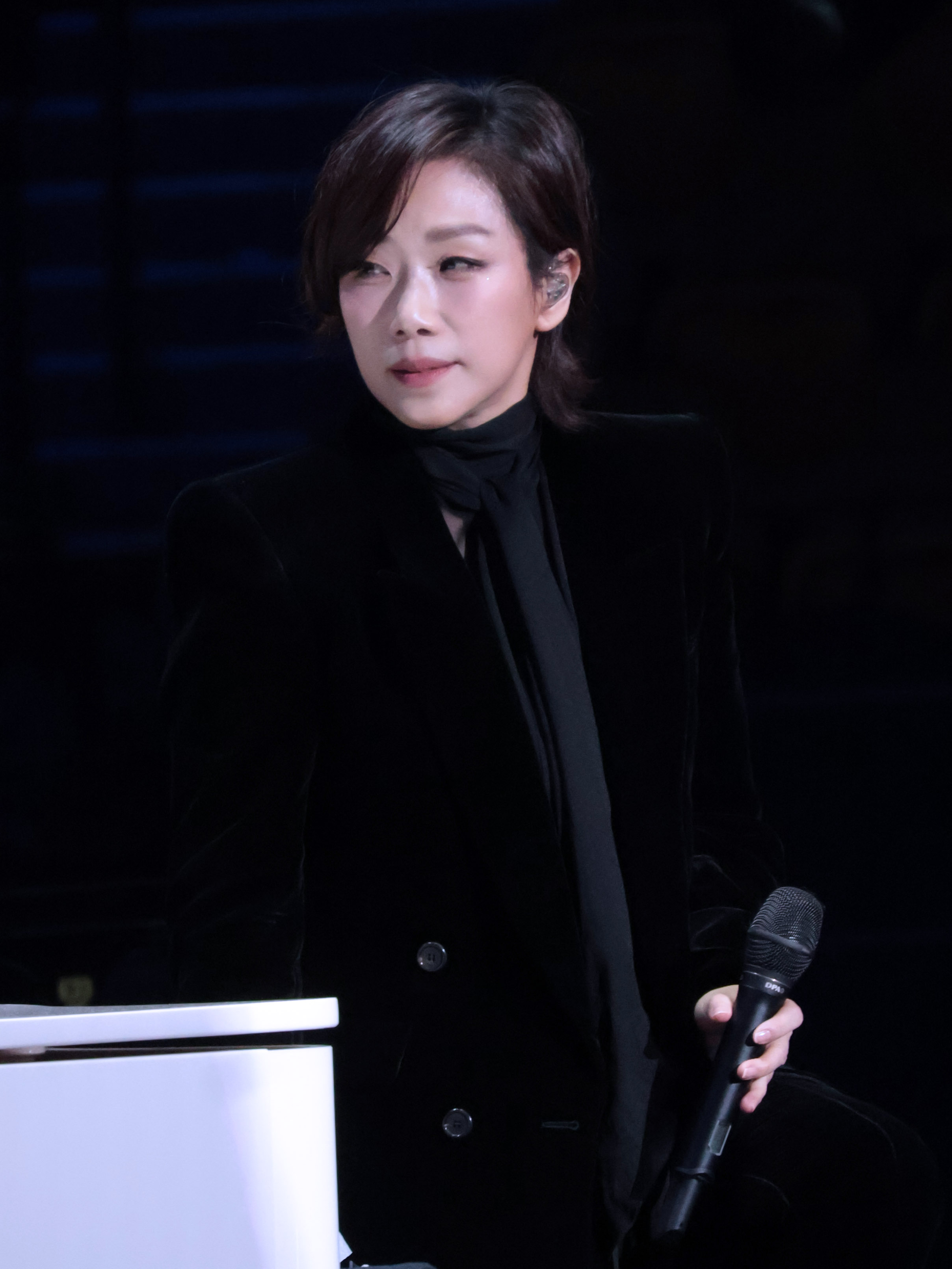
- Lam in 2024
- Studio albums: 32
- EPs: 9
- Live albums: 8
- Compilation albums: 30

This is the discography of Hong Kong recording artist Sandy Lam. Since her debut in 1985, Lam has released 32 studio albums in various languages, including Cantonese, Mandarin, Japanese and English. Her first Mandarin album, Falling in Love With Someone Who Doesn't Come Home (1990), sold over 600,000 copies in Taiwan. Lam's fourth Mandarin record, Love, Sandy (1995), sold around three million copies throughout Asia, including 800,000 copies in Taiwan. Both records are amongst the best-selling albums in Taiwan.

== Studio albums ==
=== Cantonese albums ===
Title	Album details	Sales	Certifications
Sandy Lam (林憶蓮)	Released: April 1985; Label: CBS Sony Records; Formats: LP, cassette, CD		
Self-Indulgence (放縱)	Released: March 1986; Label: CBS Sony Records; Formats: LP, cassette, CD	HK: 100,000	IFPI HK: Platinum
Sandy (憶蓮)	Released: 19 February 1987; Label: CBS Sony Records; Formats: LP, cassette, CD	HK: 100,000	IFPI HK: Platinum
Grey (灰色)	Released: 21 August 1987; Label: CBS Sony Records; Formats: LP, cassette, CD	HK: 150,000	IFPI HK: 3× Platinum
Ready	Released: 8 June 1988; Label: CBS Sony Records; Formats: LP, cassette, CD		
City Rhythm (都市觸覺)	Released: 15 December 1988; Label: Warner Music; Formats: LP, cassette, CD		IFPI HK: Platinum
City Rhythm II	Released: 24 October 1989; Label: Warner Music; Formats: LP, cassette, CD		IFPI HK: Platinum
Part III - Faces And Places (都市觸覺)	Released: 28 August 1990; Label: Warner Music; Formats: LP, cassette, CD		IFPI HK: Platinum
Drifting (夢了、瘋了、倦了)	Released: 14 February 1991; Label: Warner Music; Formats: LP, cassette, CD		
Wildflower (野花)	Released: 26 December 1991; Label: Stardust Records; Formats: CD, cassette		
Come Back To Love (回來愛的身邊)	Released: 8 October 1992; Label: Stardust Records; Formats: CD, cassette		
Begin Again (不如重新開始)	Released: 29 April 1993; Label: Stardust Records; Formats: CD, cassette		
Sandy '94	Released: 16 June 1994; Label: Stardust Records; Formats: CD, cassette		
Feeling Perfect (感覺完美)	Released: 15 January 1996; Label: Rock Records; Formats: CD, cassette		
S/L (本色)	Released: 10 November 2005; Label: Gold Medal Entertainment; Formats: CD		
In Search of Lost Time (陪著我走)	Released: 16 March 2016; Label: Lead Talent Limited; Formats: CD, digital download		

=== Mandarin albums ===
Title	Album details	Sales
Falling in Love With Someone Who Doesn't Come Home (愛上一個不回家的人)	Released: 27 December 1990; Label: UFO Records; Formats: CD, cassette	Asia: 5,000,000; TWN: 600,000
City Heart (都市心)	Released: 5 October 1991; Label: UFO Records; Formats: CD, cassette	
Doesn't Matter Who I Am (不必在乎我是誰)	Released: 14 May 1993; Label: Rock Records; Formats: CD, cassette	
Love, Sandy	Released: 25 January 1995; Label: Rock Records; Formats: CD, cassette	Asia: 4,000,000; TWN: 800,000
Night's Too Dark (夜太黑)	Released: 19 July 1996; Label: Rock Records; Formats: CD, cassette	Asia: 1,000,000
Clang Rose (鏗鏘玫瑰)	Released: 28 January 1999; Label: Rock Records; Formats: CD, cassette	
Sandy Lam's (林憶蓮's)	Released: 18 January 2000; Label: EMI; Formats: CD, cassette	
2001 Sandy (2001蓮)	Released: 5 December 2000; Label: EMI; Formats: CD, cassette	
Truly... (原來...)	Released: 6 December 2001; Label: EMI; Formats: CD, cassette	
Breathe Me (呼吸)	Released: 26 August 2006; Label: EMI; Formats: CD	
Gaia (蓋亞)	Released: 20 September 2012; Label: Universal Music; Formats: LP, CD, digital download	
0	Released: 21 December 2018; Label: Universal Music; Formats: LP, digital download	

=== Japanese albums ===
Title	Album details
Simple	Released: 10 March 1994; Label: Stardust Records/Amuse; Formats: CD, cassette
Open Up	Released: 3 March 1995; Label: Stardust Records/Amuse; Formats: CD

=== English albums ===
Title	Album details
I Swear (愛是唯一)	Released: 14 February 1996; Label: Rock Records; Formats: CD, cassette
Wonderful World (美妙世界)	Released: 31 January 1997; Label: Rock Records; Formats: CD, cassette

== Extended plays ==
Title	Album details	Certifications
Heartbreak Lane (心碎巷)	Released: 1986; Label: CBS Sony Records; Formats: LP	
Sandy (忆莲)	Released: April 1987; Label: CBS Sony Records; Formats: LP, cassette	
Project Gray Phase Three: The 12" Remix	Released: December 1987; Label: CBS Sony Records; Formats: LP, cassette	
Xin Zhuang Yi Lian (新装忆莲)	Released: December 1988; Label: CBS Sony Records; Formats: LP, CD, cassette	
City Rhythm Take Two	Released: April 1989; Label: Warner Music; Formats: LP, CD, cassette	IFPI HK: Gold
Dynamic Reaction (都市觸覺之推搪)	Released: 27 March 1990; Label: Warner Music; Formats: LP, CD, cassette	
Dance Mega Mix (傾斜都市燒燒燒)	Released: December 1990; Label: Warner Music; Formats: LP, CD, cassette	
Love Returns (回歸)	Released: 8 October 1996; Label: Rock Records; Formats: CD	
Encore	Released: 18 June 2002; Label: EMI; Formats: CD, cassette	

== Live albums ==
Title	Album details	Certifications
Yi Lian is confused and infatuated	Released: September 1991; Label: Warner Music; Formats: CD, cassette, LD, VCD, DVD	
Wild Flowers of Heaven and Earth 1993 Love Shakes the Red Hall	Released: April 1994; Label: Stardust Records; Formats: CD, cassette, LD, VHS, VCD, DVD	
Remember the memory lotus blooms	Released: 1996; Label: Rock Records; Formats: CD+VCD, CD, LD, VHS, VCD	IFPI HK: Gold
Favorite	Released: 10 July 1997; Label: Rock Records; Formats: CD, cassette	
Hong Kong Philharmonic x Lam Yi-lian x Lun Wing-liang	Released: 30 July 2004; Label: East Asia Records; Formats: CD, VCD, DVD	
Endless Night Concert	Released: 4 January 2006; Label: Gold Medal Entertainment; Formats: CD, VCD, DVD	
Yi Lian Live 07	Released: 27 February 2008; Label: Gold Medal Entertainment; Formats: CD, DVD	
Lin Yilian Concert MMXI	Released: 5 June 2012; Label: Lead Talent Limited; Formats: CD, DVD	

== Compilation albums ==
Title	Album details
Hardcover Elemium	Released: 1988; Label: CBS Sony Records; Formats: LP, cassette, CD
Platinum Collector's Edition	Released: 1989; Label: CBS Sony Records; Formats: LP, cassette, CD
Super Golden Elemium	Released: 1990; Label: CBS Sony Records; Formats: CD
Memories are always tender	Released: June 1991; Label: Warner Music; Formats: LP, cassette, CD
Memories always jump	Released: August 1991; Label: Warner Music; Formats: LP, cassette, CD
Love Ballad Collection in Chinese	Released: August 1991 (only released in Japan); Label: Warner Music (#WMC5-439); Formats: CD
Unforgettable 15 Warner Music Platinum Classics	Released: June 1992; Label: Warner Music, Stardust Records; Formats: CD, cassette
The Platinum Years 1985-1992	Released: 1992; Label: Sony, Warner Music; Formats: CD, cassette
Golden Disk Hardcover Lin Yilian	Released: 1992; Label: Warner Music; Formats: CD
The Platinum Years 1985-1992 II	Released: February 1993; Label: Sony, Warner Music; Formats: CD
Best of Sandy Lam: The Warner Music Years 1989-1992	Released: 21 December 1993; Label: Warner Music (#WMC5-673); Formats: CD
About her love story	Released: 14 October 1994; Label: Stardust Records; Formats: CD, cassette
Memories are always good	Released: 14 October 1994; Label: Flying Saucer, Warner Music; Formats: CD, cassette
Ai Lian said	Released: 1996; Label: Warner Music; Formats: CD
The Best of Sandy	Released: 1997 (only released in South Korea); Label: Rock Records; Formats: CD
Fond memories...	Released: 1997; Label: Flying Saucer, Warner Music; Formats: CD+VCD, cassette
Have Yilian	Released: October 1999; Label: Rock Records; Formats: CD, cassette
Complete Plus	Released: February 2000; Label: Creative Artist Management & Productions Limited; Formats: CD
The Story of Sandy Lam So Far	Released: February 2002; Label: Rock Records; Formats: CD
Hui·Yilian	Released: February 2002; Label: Stardust Records, Zhengdong; Formats: CD
Belong to Me	Released: 10 May 2002; Label: Viking; Formats: CD, cassette
The Best…	Released: 17 January 2003; Label: Warner Music; Formats: CD, cassette
Starting from 611	Released: March 2004; Label: Sony; Formats: CD+DVD
Sandy	Released: 1 November 2005; Label: New Age Studios; Formats: CD+DVD
Blooming Remembrance Lotus	Released: November 2005; Label: Sony, Warner Music; Formats: CD
Remembering Lianlian	Released: August 2006; Label: Rock Records; Formats: CD
Not the main feature of Yilian	Released: January 2008; Label: New Age Studios; Formats: CD
Re:Workz	Released: 17 January 2014; Label: Lead Talent Limited; Formats: CD, digital download
Sense and Sensibility: Color Memory 30 Lotus	Released: 15 May 2015; Label: Sony; Formats: CD, digital download
Still... Lin Yilian	Released: 23 March 2016; Label: Warner Music; Formats: CD, digital download

== Singles ==
=== Japanese ===
Title	Year	Peak chart positions	Sales	Album
Title	Year	JPN	Sales	Album
"Dakaratte..."	1993	48	JPN: 48,000	Simple
"Doshite Yo"	1994	46		Simple
"Pieces of Mind"	1995	—		Open Up
