= Tora-san, the Good Samaritan =

- Theatrical poster
- Directed by: Yoji Yamada
- Written by: Yoji Yamada; Yoshitaka Asama
- Starring: Kiyoshi Atsumi; Rumi Sakakibara
- Cinematography: Tetsuo Takaba
- Edited by: Iwao Ishii
- Music by: Naozumi Yamamoto
- Distributed by: Shochiku
- Release date: April 28, 1971
- Running time: 92 minutes
- Country: Japan
- Language: Japanese

Tora-san, the Good Samaritan (男はつらいよ 奮闘篇, Otoko wa Tsurai yo: Funtō hen) is a 1971 Japanese comedy film directed by Yoji Yamada. It stars Kiyoshi Atsumi as Torajirō Kuruma (Tora-san), and Rumi Sakakibara as his love interest or "Madonna". Tora-san, the Good Samaritan is the seventh entry in the popular, long-running Otoko wa Tsurai yo series.

== Cast ==
- Kiyoshi Atsumi as Torajirō
- Chieko Baisho as Sakura
- Rumi Sakakibara as Hanako Ōta
- Sachiko Mitsumoto as Fuyuko
- Chōchō Miyako as Kiku
- Kunie Tanaka as Prof. Fukui
- Hiroshi Ōtsuka as Policeman
- Gin Maeda as Hiroshi Suwa
- Chieko Misaki as Torajiro's aunt
- Hisao Dazai as Tarō Ume

== Critical appraisal ==
For his work on Tora-san, the Good Samaritan, the previous entry in the Otoko wa Tsurai yo series, Tora-san's Shattered Romance, and the following entry, Tora-san's Love Call (all 1971), Yoji Yamada tied for Best Director at the Mainichi Film Awards with Masahiro Shinoda. The German-language site molodezhnaja gives Tora-san, the Good Samaritan three and a half out of five stars.

== Availability ==
Tora-san, the Good Samaritan was released theatrically on April 28, 1971. In Japan, the film was released on videotape in 1983 and 1995, and in DVD format in 1998 and 2008.

== Bibliography ==
=== English ===
- "OTOKO WA TSURAI YO FUNTO-HEN (1971)". British Film Institute. Archived from the original on 2012-10-17.
- "OTOKO WA TSURAIYO -FUNTO HEN". Complete Index to World Film.
- Otoko wa tsurai yo: Funto hen (1971) at IMDb

=== German ===
- "Tora-San, the Good Samaritan" (in German). www.molodezhnaja.ch.

=== Japanese ===
- 男はつらいよ 奮闘篇(1971) (in Japanese). allcinema.net.
- "男はつらいよ 奮闘篇". Japanese Cinema Database (Agency for Cultural Affairs). Archived from the original on 2011-10-08.
- 男はつらいよ 奮闘篇 (in Japanese). Japanese Movie Database.
- 男はつらいよ 奮闘篇 (in Japanese). Kinema Junpo. Archived from the original on 2012-03-09.
