= A Woman and the Beancurd Soup =

- Film poster
- Directed by: Heinosuke Gosho
- Screenplay by: Toshio Ide
- Based on: A Woman and the Beancurd Soup by Yumie Hiraiwa
- Starring: Junko Ikeuchi; Keizo Kawasaki; Kei Satō; Masakazu Tamura
- Cinematography: Hiroshi Murai
- Edited by: Michio Suwa
- Music by: Ichirō Saitō
- Production company: Tokyo Eiga
- Distributed by: Toho
- Release date: 14 February 1968 (Japan)
- Running time: 87 minutes
- Country: Japan

A Woman and the Beancurd Soup (Japanese: 女と味噌汁, Hepburn: Onna to Misoshiru), also known as Women and Miso Soup, is a 1968 Japanese film directed by Heinosuke Gosho. It is a drama about a geisha who becomes independent and opens a soup stand. It is based on the novel of the same name by Yumie Hiraiwa.

== Cast ==
- Junko Ikeuchi as Chikako Muroto
- Kunie Tanaka as Shoji Ogawa
- Masakazu Tamura as Tomoichiro Sakimura
- Kazuo Kitamura as Kiyoo Ota
- Etsuko Ichihara as Kazuyo Inuyama
- Hisano Yamaoki as Suga Murai
- Kei Satō as Murata
- Keizo Kawasaki as Kiritani
- Eijirō Tōno as Ogawa

== Release ==
A Woman and the Beancurd Soup was released in Japan on 14 February 1968 where it was distributed by Toho.

== Reception ==
Hisano Yamaoka won the Best Supporting Actress award from the Mainichi Film Concours for her work in this film, as well as The House of Sleeping Virgins and The Bamboozlers.

== See also ==
- List of Japanese films of 1968
