= Michi (film) =

- Film poster
- Directed by: Koreyoshi Kurahara
- Screenplay by: Hirō Matsuda
- Based on: People of No Importance by Henri Verneuil
- Produced by: Tan Taikawa; Masayuki Sato; Gorô Kusakabe; Tatsuo Honda; Masahisa Nakayama
- Starring: Tatsuya Nakadai; Miwako Okamura; Junko Ikeuchi; Kyōhei Shibata; Tomisaburo Wakayama
- Cinematography: Yoshio Mamiya
- Edited by: Eifu Tamaki
- Music by: Michel Bernholc
- Production company: Toei Company
- Distributed by: Toei Company
- Release date: September 6, 1986 (Japan)
- Running time: 133 minutes
- Country: Japan
- Language: Japanese
- Box office: ¥450 million (Japan)

Michi (Japanese: 道), also known as The Road, Des gens sans importance and Hopeless Love, is a 1986 Japanese tragic romantic drama film directed by Koreyoshi Kurahara and written by Hirô Matsuda. It is a remake of the 1956 French film Des gens sans importance (lit. People of No Importance, known in Japan as ヘッドライト or Headlights) directed by Henri Verneuil, itself based on a novel of the same name by Serge Groussard. Its plot concerns a married long-distance truck driver who falls for a significantly younger waitress at a diner, and the trouble this affair brings to both their lives.

The film stars Tatsuya Nakadai as the protagonist, in addition to Miwako Okamura, Junko Ikeuchi, Kyōhei Shibata and Tomisaburo Wakayama. Toei Company released the film theatrically on September 6, 1986, in Japan, where it was a financial success.

== Plot ==
Middle-aged Seiji Tajima (Tatsuya Nakadai) has worked as a long-distance truck driver for 30 years. He is an exhausted man who lives in Urayasu, Chiba with a cold family. His wife Yoshiko (Junko Ikeuchi) is bitter and tired of life, and his eldest daughter Eri (Natsuko Fuji), an aspiring actress who recently graduated from high school, is emotionally distant. Seiji's best friend Minoru Shinozuka (Kyōhei Shibata) is a gambling addict who lives alone, having been divorced by his ex-wife. Seiji asks Minoru about starting a side business together to earn more money, but Minoru turns him down. This is due to Seiji's plans to deal with shady, yakuza-connected figures.

While on the road in wintertime, Seiji takes a break at the 24-hour Sakura diner on National Route 181, near Yonago, Tottori Prefecture. The diner is owned by Naoyoshi Sakura (Tomisaburo Wakayama), a former truck driver and friend of Seiji's. Sakura quit the profession after losing a leg in an accident 20 years prior. At the diner, Seiji meets a charming but put-upon young waitress named Kazue Komiya (Miwako Okamura), one of Naoyoshi's favorite employees. Seiji spends the night in his truck. The next day, Kazue has a bad shift. She proclaims that she will quit her job and go back to her mother's house in Hagi. Seiji offers her a ride there. On the way, the two bond with each other. Upon reaching their destination, they hug in the driver's cab. However, Kazue's uncaring mother rebuffs her. With nowhere else to go, Seiji takes her back to Sakura. From then on, Seiji chooses shipments passing through Route 181 so he can continue to meet with Kazue. Gradually, the two fall in love.

Seasons pass, and winter turns to spring and summer. Seiji and Kazue have a romantic get-together on the beach. Upon leaving, Seiji promises to meet her again soon. However, he is kept away from Sakura for several days as cargo bound for Yonago is interrupted. Seiji calls her to explain, but the call turns into a fight, and Kazue cries. Kazue is surprised when, soon after, Naoyoshi proposes to her. Kazue rebuffs him. Growing uncomfortable with Sakura, she moves to Tokyo to be closer to Seiji. She is soon hired at a Kabukichō love hotel named Hanabishi.

Minoru, still in love with his ex-wife Hideko (Yoshiko Mita), asks to get back together, but she refuses. This pushes him to finally agree to start the business with Seiji. However, before the company can ever be started, Minoru is tragically killed in a traffic accident right in front of him.

The season changes to winter once again. Seiji and Kazue's lives become even more entangled, until she is impregnated by Seiji. Unable to abandon his family, Seiji breaks up with Kazue before she can tell him about the pregnancy. With nowhere else to go, Kazue returns once more to the Sakura diner. Naoyoshi writes a letter to Seiji after discovering Kazue's secret. However, the letter is opened and hidden by Eri. After being severely scolded by Seiji for posing in nude magazine photos, Eri rebels and reads the letter out loud in front of her mother.

Seiji rushes out of the house and heads to Sakura. Vowing to start a new life with Kazue, Seiji loads her into his truck and drives off. However, Kazue begins to suffer from severe bleeding. It is revealed that she had a back-alley abortion, and complications from the procedure are slowly killing her. Though Seiji contacts emergency services, the ambulance does not arrive in time, and Kazue dies.

== Cast ==
- Tatsuya Nakadai as Seiji Tajima
- Miwako Okamura as Kazue Komiya (credited as Miwako Fujitani)
- Junko Ikeuchi as Yoshiko Tajima
- Natsuko Fuji as Eri Tajima
- Kazumi Sato as Risa Tajima
- Kyōhei Shibata as Minoru Shinozuka
- Tomisaburo Wakayama as Naoyoshi Sakura
- Masumi Harukawa as Matsushiro
- Aoi Nakajima as Hanabishi's wife
- Yoshiko Mita as Hideko
- Takeo Chii as Yukio
- Hiroyuki Nagato as Mizuya boss
- Takeshi Ôbayashi as Distributor

== Production ==
The project was conceived by Toei producers Gorô Kusakabe and Tatsuo Honda, both of whom were fans of the original film. They asked Koreyoshi Kurahara to direct, knowing that he drew inspiration from French filmmakers. Kurahara was concerned that the original film, made only a decade after World War II, could not be adapted to a Japan that had become prosperous in the bubble era. However, when he read the original novel, he changed his mind and agreed to direct. Kurahara wanted to portray the side characters in detail, rather than focus solely on the key relationships as in the original. Screenwriter Hirō Matsuda was chosen due to the acclaim for his previous film, Gray Sunset.

Originally, the creative team wanted to hire Ken Takakura for the lead role, which would have reteamed Takakura with Kurahara after the massive success of Antarctica. This was later changed to Tatsuya Nakadai, as Takakura's fee had risen to ¥30 million per film, plus a commission of 2% of the distribution revenue, the highest amount ever paid to a Japanese actor at the time.

Michi marked the second collaboration between director Kurahara and Tatsuya Nakadai, following Safari 5000 (1969). Nakadai had been a fan of Jean Gabin, who portrayed the protagonist in the original, since he was young. As a result, Nakadai struggled with preparation for the role from the time he accepted it until filming began. He later said, "If you think about it, it's similar to how many different actors play Hamlet. I know I'll be compared to Gabin, but I'll just play the role with my own color." He also said, "Now that I'm 53, I can really understand the feelings of a man who is at the crossroads of his career and family life. I don't think you can understand the craziness of a young woman who comes in like the wind until you're this old. This time, I want to play a completely passive role and express the confusion of a clumsy man. I feel happy to be able to play the role of the great Gabin.”

Filming began in December 1985. Shooting took place across Japan, including the prefectures of Niigata, Aomori, Aichi, Osaka, Wakayama, Tottori and Yamaguchi. Specific shooting locations included Tottori, Yonago, Nagoya, Shimonoseki and Tokyo, as well as nighttime filming in Kabukichō, Shinjuku. Production was briefly suspended around February 20, but resumed on March 20, and wrapped in late May 1986. Post-production was completed by the following month.

Miwako Okamura was reportedly difficult to work with, refusing to come out of her hotel room and complaining of headaches. Producer Gorô Kusakabe later wrote, "Being with an actress who has been pampered since she was a teenager when she didn't know much about anything is much more tiring than dealing with a Hiroshima yakuza.”

== Music ==
The film's score was composed and arranged by French musician Michel Bernholc, with the recording produced by Ryoji Nagai. Its theme song is the 1981 track "Ça M'Suffit" (lit. "That's Enough for Me") by Françoise Hardy, with lyrics and composition by Bernholc. The soundtrack also features two versions of the song "Voyageurs de la Nuit" (lit. "Night Travelers"), both composed by Bernholc and recorded specifically for the film: a wordless version sung by Hardy, and a separate version performed by Michel Delpech, with lyrics by Jean-Jacques Burah. All three tracks were released as a twelve-inch maxi single on August 1, 1986. A CD single with just Hardy's tracks was also released. The entire soundtrack was released by CBS/Sony on August 27, 1986, ahead of the film's premiere. It was distributed on audiocassette, CD and vinyl formats.

"Voyageurs de la Nuit" was later covered by Sandy Lam as the final track on her 1987 self-titled album Sandy (Lam's original track title 夜行人 has been alternatively translated in English as "Night Walker").

All music is composed by Michel Bernholc:

No.	Title	Writer(s)	Vocals	Length
1.	"Voyageurs de la Nuit (opening theme)"	Michel Bernholc	Françoise Hardy	4:37
2.	"The Lonely Driver"	Bernholc		4:03
3.	"Sadness"	Bernholc		1:48
4.	"Ça M'Suffit (Theme for 'Michi') (instrumental)"	Bernholc		3:50
5.	"Voyageurs de la Nuit"	Bernholc, Jean-Jacques Burah	Michel Delpech	4:38
6.	"Silence of Winter"	Bernholc		2:47
7.	"Theme of Love"	Bernholc		4:37
8.	"Theme for Drivers"	Bernholc		3:19
9.	"Goodbye to Love"	Bernholc		3:57
10.	"Ça M'Suffit (Theme for 'Michi')"	Bernholc	Hardy	3:50
Total length:				37:26

== Release ==
Michi was theatrically released in Japan on September 6, 1986, by Toei.

Shigeru Okada, Toei's president at the time, had read the script and liked it. However, he was disappointed after the preview screening. Okada had wanted the film to be more tear-jerking, but the preview did not make him cry. There were concerns about the film's box office potential, but it was ultimately a hit, grossing ¥450 million at the box office. Okada commented that "It was a triumph of the promotional tactics employed by Fukunaga Kuniaki, who was in charge of publicity, to thoroughly target women."

== Home media ==
Toei Video released Michi on VHS and Betamax on February 10, 1987. The film also received a LaserDisc edition, released on August 14, 1987. A DVD was later distributed on March 21, 2012, but it has since gone out of print.
