= Junko Ikeuchi =

Japanese actress (1933–2010)

- 池内 淳子
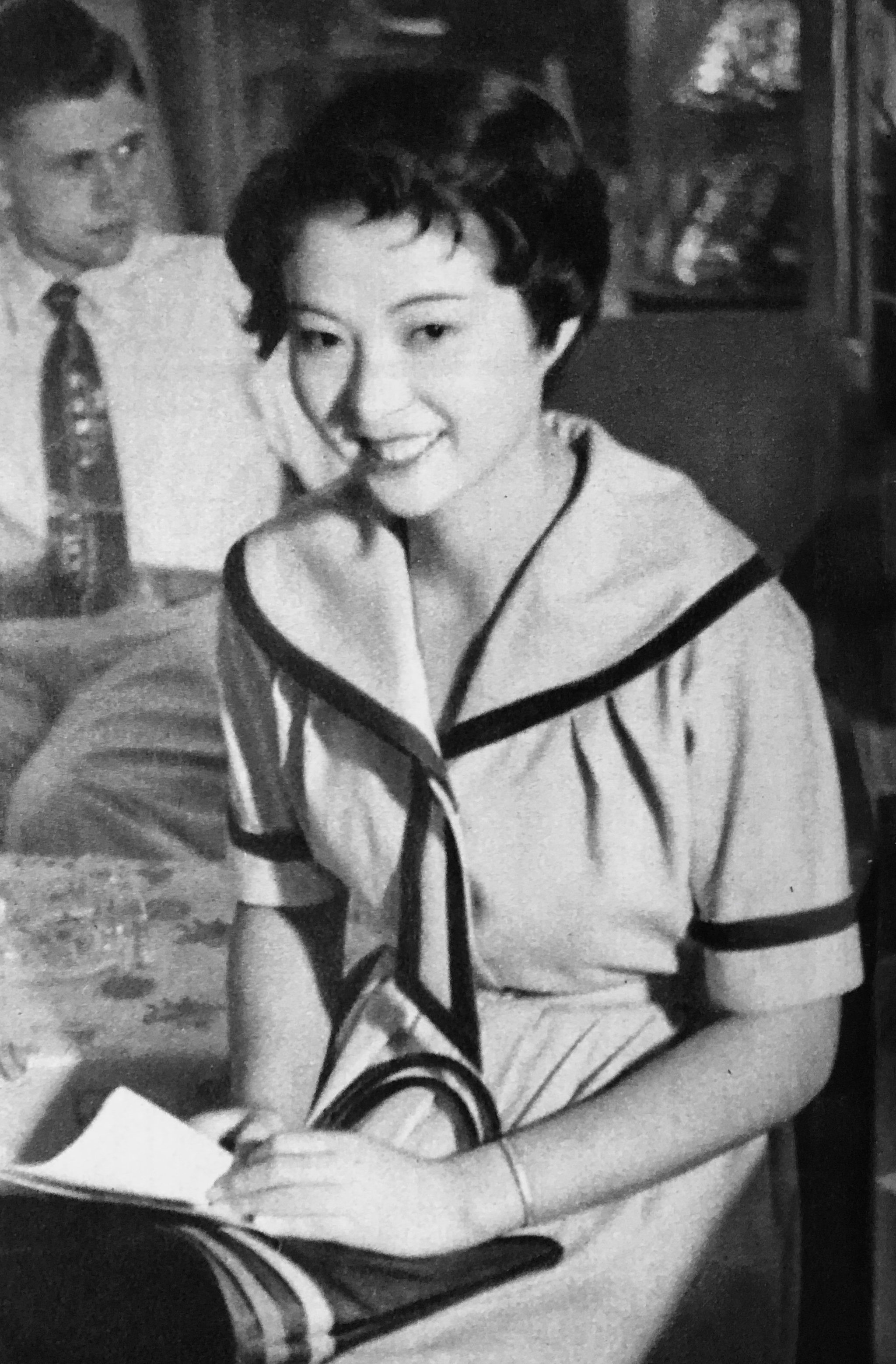
- Pictured in 1954
- Born: Sumiko Nakazawa; 4 November 1933; Honjo, Tokyo, Japan
- Died: 26 September 2010 (aged 76); Tokyo, Japan
- Occupation: Actress
- Years active: 1955–2010

Sumiko Nakazawa (中沢 純子, Nakazawa Sumiko; 4 November 1933 – 26 September 2010), known professionally as Junko Ikeuchi (池内 淳子, Ikeuchi Junko), was a Japanese actress. She joined the film studio Shintoho after being recruited from Mitsukoshi's Nihonbashi store, and subsequently starred in films and television series like Super Giant (1957), The Ghost of Yotsuya (1959), A Woman and the Beancurd Soup (1965), Illusion of Blood (1965), and Tora-san's Love Call (1971). Gaining popularity on television dramas, she also earned the nicknames "20% Actress" and "Queen of TV Dramas".

== Biography ==
=== Early life and career ===
Sumiko Nakazawa was born on 4 November 1933 in Higashi-Ryōgoku, an area in Honjo, Tokyo, the eldest of the four daughters of an umbrella plating businessman. She attended kindergarten at Tomoe Gakuen, where she started a long friendship with Tetsuko Kuroyanagi.

After graduating from Jumonji Junior and Senior High School in 1952, she passed the Mitsukoshi entrance exam, but encountered opposition from her parents and grandfather. However, after receiving an employment offer at the company's Nihonbashi store, she began working without incident. She was assigned to work at the store's kimono section, before she left the company in 1958.

=== Acting career ===
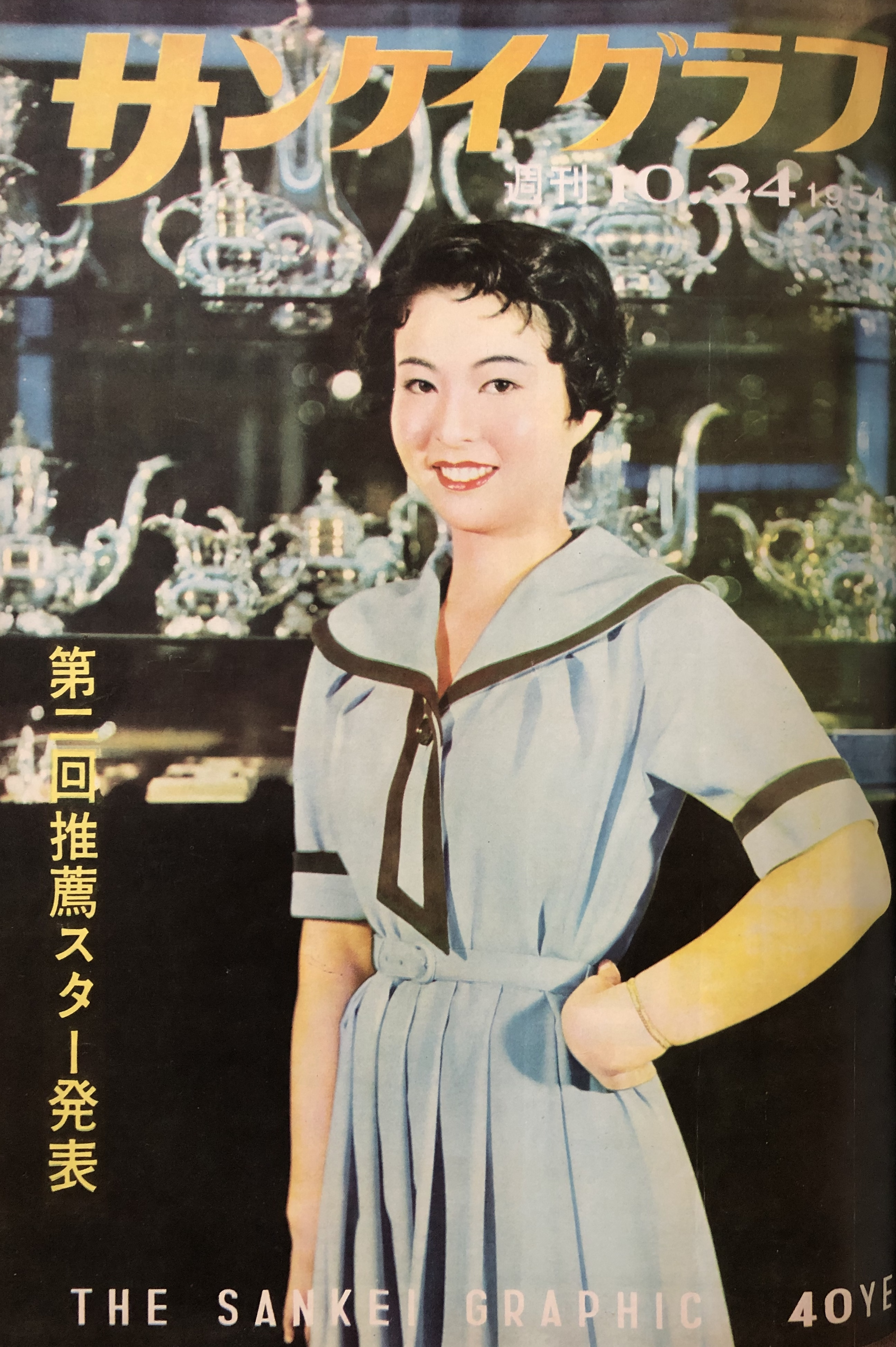
On the cover of the second edition of Sankei Graph (1954), a pictorial magazine.

In 1954, Ikeuchi joined Shintoho after their advertising staff noticed her working at Mitsukoshi, and she made her film debut in the 1955 film Kōtaishi no Hanayome. In 1956, she made her first starring role in Niizuma Kagami and was awarded the Japan Film Producers Association Newcomer Award. She subsequently appeared in the Shachō series, the Ekimae series, Super Giant (1957), and The Ghost of Yotsuya (1959). She married actor Shin'ichi Yanagisawa in 1956, but the next year they divorced and she temporarily left the film industry.

In 1960, she returned from her hiatus due to encouragement from her Shintoho peers, appearing in Hanayome Kyūketsuma. Shintoho's president Mitsugu Ōgura was reported to have subjected her to mistreatment after her comeback, a fact denied by others. She later appeared in the films Kaei (1961), Mr. Giants: Shōri no Hata (1964; Ikeuchi was a fan of the Yomiuri Giants), Beast Alley (1965), Illusion of Blood (1965), Kutsukake Tokijirō: Yukyo Ippiki (1966), Tora-san's Love Call (1971), Michi (1986), and Niji no Hashi (1993). In 1961, she moved to Tokyo Eiga after Shintoho closed, before becoming freelance in 1970. In 1962, she was awarded the Television and Radio Writers' Association of Japan Actress Award.

In addition to her film appearances, she starred in TV dramas such as Nemuri Kyōshirō: Burai-hikae, Kyou wo Ikiru, Nichinichi no Haishin, Tsukushi Dare no Ko, Hirari, Ten Urara, Toshiie to Matsu, and Shiroi Kyotō. She was known as the "Queen of TV Dramas" from the 1960s to the 1980s, and she was nicknamed the "20% Actress" after the high ratings of her appearances wearing kimonos in the 1965 drama A Woman and the Beancurd Soup. In 1966, she visited Argentina to attend the 8th Mar del Plata Film Festival. She attended Shintoho president Mitsugu Ōgura's funeral after he died in 1978.

In 1969, she began starring in theatrical productions, including The Doctor's Wife, Hatsutsubomi, On'na-tachi no Chūshingura, and Sanbaba. She won the Kikuta Kazuo Theater Prize twice: in 1982 and 2000. In 2007, she was awarded the Yomiuri Theater Award for Best Actress.

Her Japanese traditional dance teacher was Sumiko Kurishima, through which she acquired the name Mizuki Kōchō (水木紅澄) in 1970.

=== Later life and death ===
In 1999, she was awarded the Hashida Prize and NHK Broadcasting Culture Award. In 2002, she received the Ministry of Education, Culture, Sports, Science and Technology Art Encouragement Award and Medal with Purple Ribbon. In 2008, she was awarded the Order of the Rising Sun, Gold Rays with Rosette. In November 2009, she attended the ceremony commemorating the twentieth anniversary of the reign of Emperor Akihito as the entertainment field representative.

In April 2007, she was hospitalized for testing and diagnosed with interstitial pneumonia, lung cancer, and pleural effusion; therefore she stepped down from the national performance of Botan Dōrō, which was scheduled to begin on 25 May. She was discharged from the hospital in June and subsequently resumed acting, appearing in Ten to Ten. From April until May 2010, she appeared in the play Sanbaba at the Chunichi Theatre in Nagoya, but afterwards she was readmitted to the hospital following a relapse of cancer. About four months later, on 26 September 2010, she died of adenocarcinoma of the lung in Tokyo. She was 76.

Her farewell party was held on 4 November 2010, on what would have been her 77th birthday. It was hosted by Jun Inoue and Shin'ichi Kamoshita. In addition to immediate relatives, guests included:

- Yūki Amami
- Yukiji Asaoka
- Harue Akagi
- Hikari Ishida
- Fukuko Ishii
- Saburo Ishikura
- Miho Kanno
- Hiroshi Katsuno
- Akiko Kobayashi
- Mami Kumagai
- Kotomi Kyono
- Gin Maeda
- Yoshiko Mita
- Tomokazu Miura
- Aiko Nagayama
- Yoshiko Sakuma
- Ayako Sawada
- Hideki Takahashi
- Satoshi Tokushige
- Ken Utsui
- Eri Watanabe

== Filmography ==
=== Film ===
- Kōtaishi no Hanayome (1955)
- Niizuma Kagami (1956)
- Super Giant (1957)
- The Ghost of Yotsuya (1959)
- Hanayome Kyūketsuma (1960)
- Kaei (1961)
- Mr. Giants: Shōri no Hata (1964)
- Beast Alley (1965)
- Illusion of Blood (1965)
- Kutsukake Tokijirō: Yukyo Ippiki (1966)
- Tora-san's Love Call (1971)
- Michi (1986)
- Niji no Hashi (1993)

=== Television ===
- Nemuri Kyōshirō: Burai-hikae (1958)
- Kyou wo Ikiru (?)
- Nichinichi no Haishin (1960)
- A Woman and the Beancurd Soup (1965)
- Tsukushi Dare no Ko (1971)
- Hirari (1992)
- Ten Urara (1998)
- Toshiie to Matsu (2002)
- Shiroi Kyotō (2003)
- Ten to Ten (2007)
