= Illusion of Blood =

- Film poster
- Directed by: Shirō Toyoda
- Screenplay by: Toshio Yasumi
- Based on: Tokaido Yotsuya kaidan by Nanboku Tsuruya
- Produced by: Ichirō Satō; Hideyuki Shiino
- Starring: Tatsuya Nakadai; Mariko Okada
- Cinematography: Hiroshi Murai
- Edited by: Chizuru Hirose
- Music by: Tōru Takemitsu
- Production company: Tokyo Eiga
- Distributed by: Toho
- Release date: 25 July 1965 (Japan)
- Running time: 105 minutes
- Country: Japan
- Language: Japanese

Illusion of Blood (Japanese: 四谷怪談, Hepburn: Yotsuya kaidan; lit. "Yotsuya Ghost Story") is a 1965 Japanese drama and horror film directed by Shirō Toyoda.

== Cast ==
- Tatsuya Nakadai as Iemon Tamiya
- Mariko Okada as Oiwa
- Junko Ikeuchi as Osode
- Mayumi Ozora as Oume
- Keiko Awaji as Omaki
- Kanzaburo Nakamura as Gonbei Naosuke
- Yasushi Nagata as Samon Yotsuya
- Eitaro Ozawa as Kihei Ito
- Masao Mishima as Takuetsu

== Production ==
Illusion of Blood was based on the kabuki play Tokaido Yotsuya kaidan by Nanboku Tsuruya, which had already been adapted to film before, including The Yotsuya Ghost Story I & II and The Yotsuya Ghost Story. This version of the film focuses on the increasing madness of the character of Iemon Tamiya.

== Release ==
Illusion of Blood was distributed theatrically in Japan by Toho on 25 July 1965 and in the United States as Illusion of Blood with English subtitles in March 1966.

== Reception ==
In a contemporary review, "Dool." of Variety referred to the film as a "blood-curdling Japanese ghost story", noting that the cast was "uniformly fine" and that "technical aspects, except for some abrupt cuts are first rate." A second review by "Mosk." of Variety compared the film to Kwaidan and Ugetsu, noting that Illusion of Blood lacked "classical rigor" or ""human insight and observation" that the other films had respectively. Mosk. added that the film did have "style, and good acting, excellent color and avoids violence and horror for its own sake."

A retrospective review by Cavett Binion of AllMovie found the film to be an inferior version of the film Kwaidan, opining that it was "not as visually commanding" but that it "has its share of nightmarish imagery and cultural richness."
