= The Petrified Forest (1973 film) =

- Film poster
- Directed by: Masahiro Shinoda
- Screenplay by: Nobuo Yamada
- Based on: The Petrified Forest by Shintarō Ishihara
- Produced by: Tomohiro Kaiyama
- Starring: Kenichi Hagiwara; Sayoko Ninomiya; Masako Yagi; Takeshi Kusaka; Hiroshi Mizushima
- Cinematography: Kōzō Okazaki
- Edited by: Sachiko Yamaji
- Music by: Tōru Takemitsu
- Production companies: Tokyo Eiga; Hyogen-sha
- Distributed by: Toho
- Release date: 1 September 1973 (Japan)
- Running time: 117 minutes
- Country: Japan
- Language: Japanese

The Petrified Forest (Japanese: 化石の森, Hepburn: Kaseki no mori) is a 1973 Japanese existential drama film directed by Masahiro Shinoda. The film is based on a novel of the same name by Japanese author and politician Shintarō Ishihara.

== Plot ==
The movie revolves around youth angst and a complicated relationship between mother and son. Haruo works in a university hospital trying to work toward a degree in medicine, but is hindered by his hatred of department head Mr. Miyaji. Meanwhile, he decides to get a rival in love out of the way by poisoning him. As the angst-ridden Haruo deals with his problems in his own unique ways, his nagging mother holds out hope that her son will soon return home.

== Cast ==
- Kenichi Hagiwara
- Sayoko Ninomiya
- Masako Yagi
- Takeshi Kusaka
- Hiroshi Mizushima
- Masami Horiuchi
- Shin Tatsuoka
- Akio Tanaka
- Shin Kishida

== Release ==
The Petrified Forest was released theatrically in Japan on 1 September 1973, where it was distributed by Toho.

== Sources ==
- Galbraith IV, Stuart (2008). The Toho Studios Story: A History and Complete Filmography. Scarecrow Press. ISBN 978-1461673743.
