= People of No Importance =

- Directed by: Henri Verneuil
- Written by: Henri Verneuil; François Boyer
- Produced by: René Lafuite; Marcel Berbert; Ignace Morgenstern
- Starring: Jean Gabin; Françoise Arnoul
- Cinematography: Louis Page
- Edited by: Christian Gaudin
- Music by: Joseph Kosma
- Distributed by: Cocinor
- Release date: 15 February 1956
- Running time: 101 minutes
- Country: France
- Language: French

People of No Importance (French: Des gens sans importance) is a 1956 French drama film directed by Henri Verneuil. It was based on the novel of the same name by Serge Groussard. Set entirely among ordinary working people, it tells the story of an unhappily married long-distance lorry driver who starts an affair with a young waitress at a restaurant where he stops frequently, but tragedy intervenes. The film was remade in 1986 by Koreyoshi Kurahara as Michi.

== Plot ==
Jean is a long-distance lorry driver whose usual run is from Paris, where he lives with his unsympathetic wife and children, to Bordeaux. A favourite stop is La Caravane, a roadside restaurant where he is attracted to Clo, a pretty and affectionate young woman who is estranged from her family and survives by waitressing. Anxious to be with him, she gives up her job and goes to Paris, where she finds work as a chambermaid in a sordid hotel used by prostitutes. She also finds that she is pregnant, which the hotel manager resolves by sending her for an illegal abortion. Jean meanwhile has been sacked, partly because his tachograph showed too much time spent at La Caravane, and as soon as he finds another job he arranges to take her home in his lorry. But septicaemia has set in and, though he stops on the way and calls an ambulance, she dies.

== Cast ==
- Jean Gabin as Jean Viard, lorry driver and lover of Clo
- Françoise Arnoul as Clotilde Brachet, called Clo, waitress
- Pierre Mondy as Pierrot Berty, Jean's co-driver
- Paul Frankeur as Émile Barchandeau, owner of La Caravane
- Yvette Etiévant as Solange Viard, Jean's wife
- Dany Carrel as Jacqueline Viard, Jean's teenage daughter
- Lila Kedrova as Madame Vacopoulos, hotel manager
