= Burundi Black =

Single by Burundi Steiphenson Black
- Released: 1971
- Recorded: Sample taken from Musique du Burundi, recorded in 1967
- Genre: Tribal, experimental
- Label: Barclay Records
- Songwriter: Mike Steiphenson
- Producer: Mike Steiphenson

"Burundi Black" is a 1971 recording credited to Burundi Steiphenson Black. Released as a single, it reached #31 on the UK Singles Chart and #74 in Australia.

The single was arranged and produced by French pianist, arranger and record producer Michel Bernholc (1941 – June 5, 2002). He was a classically trained pianist who had previously worked with pop musicians such as Michel Berger, France Gall, Françoise Hardy and Claude François. For the "Burundi Black" single, he used the pseudonym Mike Steïphenson.

The record sampled track B5 from a recording of drumming from Burundi. The recording was made in 1967 by anthropologists Michel Vuylsteke and Charles Duvelle, and was released on the album Musique du Burundi on the French Ocora label in 1968 (OCR 40), which was re-published as Burundi. Musiques traditionnelles in 2015, including additional recordings. The song is entitled "Ingoma", which simply means "Song" in Kirundi and most other Bantu languages. The musicians are just credited as "Ensemble de Tambours" - "Ensemble of Drummers". Steiphenson overdubbed his own piano and guitar rock arrangement onto the recording.

In 1981, a new arrangement of "Burundi Black" was recorded by drummer Rusty Egan and French record producer Jean-Philippe Iliesco, and released in the UK and US where it became a dancefloor hit, described by music critic Robert Palmer as "glitzy pop-schlock, a throwaway with a beat". Palmer noted that, although Steiphenson had retained copyright over "Burundi Black", the Burundian musicians made no money from any of the recordings.

The recording of Burundi drummers was also sampled by Joni Mitchell on her song "The Jungle Line" (1975), and the Beastie Boys' "59 Chrystie Street" (1989), and inspired the Def Leppard single "Rocket" (1987).
