= Michel Bernholc =

- Also known as: Burundi Steïphenson Black; Mike Steïphenson
- Born: Michel Bernholc; 10 July 1941
- Origin: France
- Died: 5 June 2002 (aged 60)
- Label: Barclay Records

Michel Bernholc (Paris, 10 July 1941 – Montreuil 5 June 2002) was a French composer, arranger and producer. Using the pseudonym Mike Steïphenson, he wrote and produced the 1971 hit "Burundi Black", which made #31 on the UK Singles Chart and #74 in Australia.

He also wrote the Victoire Scott song "La Licorne D’or", which was covered by the Swedish symphonic metal band Therion on their fifteenth full-length musical album Les Fleurs du Mal.

Michel wrote the score for the Japanese film Michi in 1986.

In 2002, Bernholc committed suicide by shooting himself in the head.
