= Tora-san's Shattered Romance =

- Theatrical poster
- Directed by: Yoji Yamada
- Written by: Yoji Yamada; Akira Miyazaki
- Starring: Kiyoshi Atsumi; Ayako Wakao; Chieko Baisho; Chishū Ryū; Hisaya Morishige
- Cinematography: Tetsuo Takaba
- Edited by: Iwao Ishii
- Music by: Naozumi Yamamoto
- Distributed by: Shochiku
- Release date: January 15, 1971
- Running time: 90 minutes
- Country: Japan
- Language: Japanese

Tora-san's Shattered Romance (男はつらいよ 純情篇, Otoko wa Tsurai yo: Junjō hen) aka Tora-san in Love is a 1971 Japanese comedy film directed by Yoji Yamada. It stars Kiyoshi Atsumi as Torajirō Kuruma (Tora-san), and Ayako Wakao as his love interest or "Madonna". Tora-san's Shattered Romance is the sixth entry in the popular, long-running Otoko wa Tsurai yo series.

== Synopsis ==
In Nagasaki, Tora helps a penniless young woman with a young child, on her way back to her father’s house on Goto Island after leaving her husband. The father tells her to return to the husband; Tora, listening to this, realizes he also must not depend on an assured home to return to… but hearing the whistle of the last ferry, he impulsively leaves for Tokyo. Meanwhile at the Shibamata sweet shop, Yuko, a distant relative of Tora’s aunt has also left her husband and is being given refuge, and Tora’s sister Sakura’s husband Hiroshi has plans to borrow money from his father, leave “Tako” Shacho (boss)’s print shop and set up on his own. Shacho is devastated, sure that he’ll go bankrupt without his best worker. Tora returns, falls for Yuko and makes the worst mess of mediating between Hiroshi and Shacho. Hiroshi’s father, however, doesn’t have money to lend, so Hiroshi agrees to stay. Yuko’s husband comes for her and she agrees to reconcile. Tora heads out again for New Year work. The Goto woman, husband and child, also reconciled, visit the sweet shop to thank the absent Tora. She calls her father who is stoically home alone.

== Cast ==
- Kiyoshi Atsumi as Torajiro
- Chieko Baisho as Sakura
- Ayako Wakao as Yūko Akashi
- Shin Morikawa as Kuruma Tatsuzō
- Chieko Misaki as Tsune Kuruma (Torajiro's aunt)
- Gin Maeda as Hiroshi Suwa
- Chishū Ryū as Gozen-sama
- Hisao Dazai as Tarō Ume
- Gajirō Satō as Genkō
- Hisaya Morishige as Senzō
- Nobuko Miyamoto as Kinuyo
- Tatsuo Matsumura as Doctor Yamashita
- Gorō Tarumi as Yūko's husband

== Critical appraisal ==
For his work on Tora-san's Shattered Romance as well as the next two entries in the Otoko wa Tsurai yo series, Tora-san, the Good Samaritan and Tora-san's Love Call (all 1971), Yoji Yamada tied for Best Director at the Mainichi Film Awards with Masahiro Shinoda. The German-language site molodezhnaja gives Tora-san's Shattered Romance three and a half out of five stars.

== Availability ==
Tora-san's Shattered Romance was released theatrically on January 15, 1971. In Japan, the film was released on videotape in 1983 and 1995, and in DVD format in 2005 and 2008.

== Bibliography ==
=== English ===
- "OTOKO WA TSURAI YO JUNJO-HEN (1971)". British Film Institute. Archived from the original on 2012-10-17.
- "OTOKO WA TSURAIYO -JUNJO HEN". Complete Index to World Film.
- Otoko wa tsurai yo: Junjô hen (1971) at IMDb

=== German ===
- "Tora-San's Shattered Romance" (in German). www.molodezhnaja.ch.

=== Japanese ===
- 男はつらいよ 純情篇(1971) (in Japanese). allcinema.net.
- "男はつらいよ 純情篇". Japanese Cinema Database (Agency for Cultural Affairs). Archived from the original on 2011-10-08.
- 男はつらいよ 純情篇 (in Japanese). Japanese Movie Database.
- 男はつらいよ 純情篇 (in Japanese). Kinema Junpo. Archived from the original on 2012-03-09.
