= City Rhythm =

Studio album by Sandy Lam
- Released: December 1988
- Genre: Cantopop
- Label: Warner Bros. Records

Sandy Lam chronology
Ready (1988)	City Rhythm (1988)	逃離鋼筋森林 (1989)

City Rhythm (都市觸覺 Part I City Rhythm) is the sixth studio album by Sandy Lam, released by Warner Bros. Records in the winter of 1988. "City Rhythm" is the first of a trilogy of albums that launched Sandy's career into the top ranks of 1980s Hong Kong female singers. "City Rhythm" consists of dance-pop and covers of ballads originally recorded by American and European pop singers. Sandy served as executive producer along with Clarence Hui and Anthony Lun. “City Rhythm” portrays the life of a young urban professional woman of the late 1980s.

== Track listing ==
1. In the Midst of the Night (三更夜半)
2. Thunderstorm Windy Night (雷電風雨夜) (Cover of "Infatuation" by Taja Sevelle)
3. It's Late at Night... No Excuses (夜了...沒有藉口) (Cover of "Make It Real" by The Jets)
4. What's Left Behind... (還有...) --Duet with Dave Wang (Cover of "End" (結束) by Yvonne Zheng and Jonathan Lee)
5. See The Morning Sun Again (又見朝陽)
6. Once We've Touched (一接觸) (Cover of "Cross My Heart" by Eighth Wonder)
7. You Are My Man (你是我的男人) (Cover of "You Are My Man" by Viktor Lazlo)
8. City Dreams (偷閒) (Cover of "Love in a World Gone Mad" by Agnetha Fältskog)
9. Talk More Mistaketh More (講多錯多) (Cover of "Don't Rush Me" by Taylor Dayne)
10. Crazy Because of You (因你瘋了)

== Alternate versions ==
In the Midst of the Night (Spring Version)--Released under "City Rhythm Part One Take Two" Warner Bros. Records 1989
What's Left Behind... (Music Version)--Released under "City Rhythm Part One Take Two" Warner Bros. Records 1989
Talk More Mistaketh More (So Angry that You can Dance)--Released under "City Rhythm Part One Take Two" Warner Bros. Records 1989

== Commercial success ==
Being the first album for a new company, “City Rhythm” lived up to expectations and went platinum. The album has succeeded because of Sandy's new image and an extension of her last album's music.

Hit singles (chronologically) include “Talk More Mistaketh More”, “What's Left Behind...”, “In the midst of the Night” and “You are My Man”. All four singles performed very well commercially, the biggest hit being “Talk More Mistaketh More”. The first two singles topped the RTHK charts, while “Talk More Mistaketh More” also reaches No. 1 on the CRHK charts. In the CRHK charts, “What’s Left Behind…”, “You are My Man” and “In the Midst of the Night” peaked at No.3, 10 and 17 respectively.
