= Sandy Lam (album) =

Sandy Lam (林憶蓮同名專輯)

Studio album by Sandy Lam
- Released: April 1985
- Genre: Cantopop
- Length: CD 38:14
- Label: CBS Records
- Producer: Fung Geng Fei

Sandy Lam chronology
Sandy Lam (林憶蓮同名專輯) (1985)	Anger (放縱) (1986)

Sandy Lam is the debut album by the Hong Kong singer Sandy Lam. It was released under CBS Records in 1985.

== Track listing ==
1. I Don't Know About Love (愛情I Don't Know)
2. First Date (第一次約會)
3. Girlie Feelings (少女的心)
4. Summer's Umbrella (太陽傘下)
5. Please Do Not Leave (不想你走)
6. Beautiful Moment (美的片刻)
7. Love Vehicle (高速愛情車)
8. Troubled Teenagers (苦難中的少年)
9. Red Lips (搖擺口紅)
10. Quiet Date (無聲約會)

== Alternate versions ==
- I Don't Know About Love—Summer Remix—Released under Summer Remix 1985 CBS Records, 1985
- Girlie Feelings—Vocal Dub Mix—Released under Brand New Sandy CBS records, 1988

== Musical aspects ==
This album was produced to create the image of a Japanese idol. Seven of the ten tracks are covers of popular Japanese songs. The music was chiefly composed by Hong Kong singer Kwok Siu Lum, with lyrics by Calvin Poon. The lyrics are meant to reflect typical thoughts and expressions of a teenage girl. The music is done in the style of Akina Nakamori and Seiko Matsuda, making heavy use of guitar and drum machines to create rock-disco genre songs. Two of the songs (I Don't Know About Love and Red Lips) covered Seiko Matsuda.

== Release history ==
Region	Date	Label	Format	Catalog
Hong Kong	1985	CBS/Sony Hong Kong Ltd.	Record	CBA137
Hong Kong	1985	CBS/Sony Hong Kong Ltd.	Cassette	CBK137
Hong Kong	2005	Sony BMG Music Entertainment (Hong Kong) Ltd.	CD	82876715672
