= Ready (Sandy Lam album) =

Studio album by Sandy Lam
- Released: June 8, 1988
- Genre: Cantopop
- Label: CBS Records

Sandy Lam chronology
灰色 (1987)	Ready (1988)	City Rhythm (1988)

Ready is the fifth studio album by Sandy Lam, released under CBS Records on June 8, 1988. "Ready" is her first album with a strong R&B and Jazz influence. This is her last album produced by CBS Records.

== Track listing ==
1. Self-made Space (自製空間)
2. Evening (黃昏)
3. Best Actor (最佳男主角)
4. Him (他)
5. Undrunken Night... (不醉夜...)
6. Are You Ready?(滴汗)
7. Rainy Days (下雨天)--Duet with Blue Jeans
8. Best Actor (after the ceremonies...at his penthouse suite) (最佳男主角(頒獎典禮後...at his penthouse suite))
9. I Don't Want You to Go (真想你知道)
10. Where Do Broken Hearts Go (命運是否這樣)

== Alternate versions ==
Best Actor (Refresh Mix)--Released under "Brand New Sandy" CBS record 1988
Are You Ready? (Guitar Mix)--Released under "Brand New Sandy" CBS record 1988

== Commercial aspect ==
This album received double platinum. The main singles of this album were "Are You Ready?", "Rainy Days" and "Best Actor". "Are You Ready?" topped the RTHK charts and debuted at #1 at the CRHK charts. "Are You Ready?" earned Sandy a Jade Solid Gold award and nomination in 1988."Rainy Days" and "Best Actor" also peaked at #8 in the CRHK charts.
