= Self-Indulgence (album) =

Self-Indulgence (放縱)

Studio album by Sandy Lam
- Released: March 1986
- Genre: Cantopop
- Label: CBS Records

Sandy Lam chronology
Sandy Lam (林憶蓮) (1985)	Self-Indulgence (放縱) (1986)	Sandy (憶蓮) (1987)

Self-Indulgence (Cantonese: fong3 zung3) is the second album by Sandy Lam, released under CBS Records in 1986. This album achieved a platinum level (50,000 units) in the summer of 1986.

== Track listing ==
1. Anger (放縱)
2. Cupid's Holiday (愛神 Holiday)
3. Am I your love tomorrow? (明天是否愛我)
4. Save me, quick! (快快救我)
5. Kiss (偷吻)
6. Heartbreak Alley (心碎巷)
7. Crazy for me (為我心痴)
8. Corner of the street (長街的一角)
9. I am yours already (但我已給你)
10. Heart adventure (心裡探險)

== Alternate versions ==
- Anger (Lonely Mix)--Released under "Summer Remix 1986" CBS record 1986
- Heartbreak Alley (Heartbreak Mix)--Released under "Heartbreak Alley EP" CBS record 1986
- Cupid's Holiday (Holiday Mix)--Released under "Heartbreak Alley EP" CBS record 1986
- Heartbreak Alley (Special Mix)--Released under "Heartbreak Alley EP" CBS record 1986
