= Tokyo Eiga =

Tokyo Eiga Co., Ltd.
- Native name: 東京映画株式会社
- Romanized name: Tōkyō Eiga kabushiki gaisha
- Company type: Subsidiary
- Industry: Film
- Founded: May 27, 1952; 74 years ago
- Defunct: August 25, 1983
- Successor: Tokyo Eiga Shinsha
- Headquarters: Setagaya, Tokyo, Japan
- Parent: Toho
- Subsidiaries: Tokyo Eiga Studios

Tokyo Eiga Co., Ltd. (東京映画株式会社, Tōkyō Eiga kabushiki-gaisha) was a Japanese film production company founded in 1952 as a subsidiary of Toho. Originally based in Kamiōsaki, Shinagawa, Tokyo, it relocated to Setagaya in 1962. Among the company's co-productions were Onibaba (1964), None but the Brave (1965), The Face of Another (1966), and Goyokin (1969).

On August 25, 1983, Tokyo Eiga was reorganized and absorbed into Tokyo Eiga Shinsha, which continued producing films and re-releasing Tokyo Eiga's catalog. Tokyo Eiga Shinsha later merged with Toho on September 1, 2004, and was dissolved.

== Selected films ==
- The Whisper of Spring (1952) - debut
- Escape to Danger (1953)
- Autumn Interlude (1954)
- Chakkari fujin to Ukkari fujin (1954)
- Mother's First Love (1954)
- Anmitsu Princess (1954)
- A Song of Memory (1955)
- There Will Be a Blue Sky (1955)
- Masurawo hashutsufu kai (1956)
- A Cat, Shozo, and Two Women (1956)
- Tokyo is a Fine Place (1957)
- A Texan in Tokyo (1957)
- Thirty-Six Passengers (1957)
- Otora-san (1957)
- Comedy: The Ryokan in Front of the Train Station (1958)
- I Can't Give Up (1958)
- Pilgrimage at Night (1959)
- Hanayome-san wa sekai-ichi (1959)
- The Twilight Story (1960)
- Happiness of Us Alone (1961)
- Obon, The Moll Dipper (1961)
- Death on the Mountain (1961)
- Girls of the Night (1961)
- Flower's Shadow (1961)
- Let's Meet in Our Dreams (1962)
- Burari Bura-bura Monogatari (1962)
- Melancholy Playing Field (1963)
- Pressure of Guilt (1963)
- Mr. Giants - Victory Flag (1964)
- Hot Spring Ghost (1964)
- Could I But Live (1964)
- This Madding Crowd (1964)
- Sweet Sweat (1964)
- Onibaba (1964) [with Kindai Eiga Kyōkai]
- None but the Brave (1965) [with Artanis Productions]
- Illusion of Blood (1965)
- Akuto (1965) [with Kindai Eiga Kyōkai]
- The Face of Another (1966) [with Teshigahara Productions]
- Sono Hito wa Mukashi (1967)
- A Woman and the Beancurd Soup (1968)
- Dorifutazu desu yo! Totte totte torimakure (1968)
- Hymn to a Tired Man (1968)
- Goyokin (1969) [with Fuji Television]
- Fort Ezo (1970)
- The Wolves (1971)
- Hairpin Circus (1972)
- The Petrified Forest (1973)
- Lady Snowblood (1973)
- Three Old Women (1974)
- Lady Snowblood: Love Song of Vengeance (1974)
- Hyōryū (1981)
