= Sandy (Sandy Lam album) =

Sandy (憶蓮)

Studio album by Sandy Lam
- Released: February 19, 1987
- Recorded: May–June 1987, November 1987
- Genre: Cantopop
- Label: CBS Records

Sandy Lam chronology
Anger (放縱) (1986)	Sandy (憶蓮) (1987)	Grey (灰色) (1987)

Sandy is the third, and self-titled, Cantopop album by Sandy Lam, released on CBS/Sony Records 19 Feb 1987.

== Track listing ==
1. Ashes of Love (愛的廢墟)
2. East and West (東方西方)
3. Lost (迷亂)
4. Innocent Diary (純情筆記)
5. Unexpected Meeting (邂逅)
6. Passion (激情) - Cantonese cover of Take My Breath Away by Berlin
7. Tough Heroine (獨行少女)
8. Love Sparks (情愛火花)
9. Mind Made Up (決絕)
10. Night Walker (夜行人) – Cantonese cover of "Voyageurs de la Nuit" from Michi
