= Yumie Hiraiwa =

Japanese author (1932–2023)

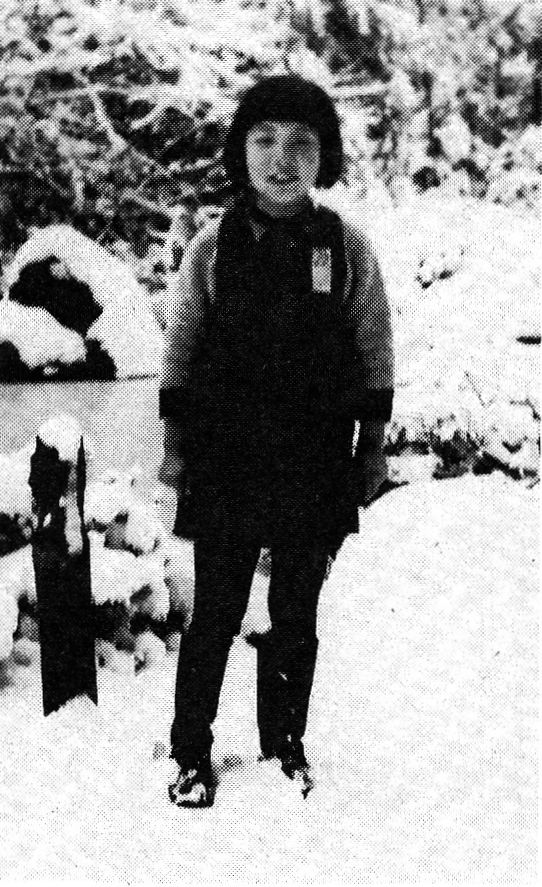
Hiraiwa in 1939

Yumie Hiraiwa (平岩 弓枝, Hiraiwa Yumie, 15 March 1932 – 9 June 2023) was a Japanese Naoki Award-winning author.

== Life ==
The daughter of the chief priest of Yoyogi Hachiman shrine, Hiraiwa was born in Tokyo in 1932. After graduating from the Department of Japanese Literature at Japan Women's University, the aspiring author studied under novelist Togawa Yukio and became a member of Shinyo-kai, an organization to promote literature established in memory of novelist Hasegawa Shin. In 1959, her work Taganeshi (A Sword Name-Engraver) won the Naoki Award.

Hiraiwa died from pneumonia on 9 June 2023, at the age of 91.

== Works ==
Hiraiwa's representative works include the historical detective-story series Onyado Kawasemi (The Kawasemi Inn). Her works cover a wide range of genres, including historical and contemporary novels, mysteries, novels on adolescence and scripts for plays and TV dramas. In 1987, she became a member of the selection committee for the Naoki Award.
