= Wildflower (Sandy Lam album) =

Studio album by Sandy Lam
- Released: December 1991
- Studio: Sound Station; EMI Recording Studio; R&B Recording Studio; Form Recording Studio
- Genre: Cantopop
- Length: 47:39
- Label: Stardust Records
- Producer: Clarence Hui ( also exec.); Sandy Lam; Yang Zhen Long; Chiu Tsang Hei (co.)

Sandy Lam chronology
City Heart (1991)	Wildflower (1991)	Come Back To Love (1992)

Wildflower (Chinese: 野花; Jyutping: je5 faa1) is the twelfth studio album by Hong Kong singer Sandy Lam, released by Stardust Records in December 1991. As part of the "unplugged" craze in the Cantopop scene, it is widely considered her signature album.

== Track listing ==
All tracks produced by Clarence Hui and Sandy Lam, except "Let Me Live and Cry (reprise)" produced by Yang Zhen Long, and "Predestiny (multi-dimensional mix)" contains additional production by Patrick Delay.

No.	Title	Lyrics	Music	Arranger(s)	Length
1.	"Wildflower Overture / Let Me Live and Cry" (只要我活過哭過)	David Richardson; Doug Edwards / Thomas Chow	Richardson; Edwards / Dick Lee	Lee / Chiu Tsang Hei	5:43
2.	"The Seed of Love" (一輩子心情)	Lin Xi	Andrew Tuason	Tuason	4:41
3.	"Waterlilies" (花之色)	Chow	Lee	Roel Garcia	5:02
4.	"Moonflower" (夜來香)	Jin Yu Gu; Chow^{[a]}	Jin; Lee^{[b]}	Lee; Chen Ze Zhong	3:54
5.	"Temptation of the Rose" (薔薇之戀)	Zhou Cong	Kuang Tian Pei	Lee; Tang Yi Cong	3:52
6.	"Predestiny" (再生戀)	Richard Lam	Lee	Lee	5:51
7.	"Flower in the Wind" (野花)	R. Lam	Lee	Chen Ming Dao	4:20
8.	"Brief Encounter" (沒有發生的愛情)	Calvin Poon	Anthony Lun	Lun	4:13
9.	"Promise Me" (沒有你 還是愛你)	Chow	Beverley Craven	Tuason	5:00
10.	"Wildflower"	Richardson; Edwards	Richardson; Edwards	Garcia	3:16
11.	"Let Me Live and Cry (reprise)"	Chow	Lee	Lee; Chiu	1:29
Total length:					47:39

Japanese edition bonus track
No.	Title	Lyrics	Music	Arranger(s)	Length
12.	"Predestiny" (multi-dimensional mix)	R. Lam	Lee	Tan Guo Zheng; Patrick Delay	5:52

Notes:

- ^{^a} signifies additional lyrics by
- ^{^b} signifies additional music by
- "Wildflower Overture" is performed by Dick Lee.
- "Moonflower" is a cover of Yoshiko Yamaguchi's song Yè lái xiāng (夜來香).
- "Temptation of the Rose" is a cover of Yǐn Fang Ling's (尹芳玲) song Qiáng wēi zhī liàn (薔薇之戀).
- "Predestiny" contains an uncredited excerpt from the poem Zàng huā cí (葬花詞) in the novel Dream of the Red Chamber.
- "Promise Me" is the Cantonese version of the song of the same name, written and performed by Beverley Craven.
- "Wildflower" is a cover of Skylark's 1972 song of the same.
