= Tora-san's Love Call =

- Theatrical poster
- Directed by: Yoji Yamada
- Written by: Yoji Yamada; Yoshitaka Asama
- Starring: Kiyoshi Atsumi; Junko Ikeuchi
- Cinematography: Tetsuo Takaba
- Edited by: Iwao Ishii
- Music by: Naozumi Yamamoto
- Distributed by: Shochiku
- Release date: November 20, 1971
- Running time: 114 minutes
- Country: Japan
- Language: Japanese

Tora-san's Love Call (男はつらいよ 寅次郎恋歌, Otoko wa Tsurai yo: Torajiro Koiuta) aka Tora-san's Love Song is a 1971 Japanese comedy film directed by Yoji Yamada. It stars Kiyoshi Atsumi as Torajirō Kuruma (Tora-san), and Junko Ikeuchi as his love interest or "Madonna". Tora-san's Love Call is the eighth entry in the popular, long-running Otoko wa Tsurai yo series.

== Synopsis ==
Hoping to find rest from his wandering life, Tora-san returns home. He becomes infatuated with a widow and leaves to travel again, keeping his feelings secret.

== Cast ==
- Kiyoshi Atsumi as Torajirō
- Chieko Baisho as Sakura
- Takashi Shimura as Hyōichirō Suwa (Hiroshi's father)
- Shin Morikawa as Tatsuzō (Torajiro's uncle)
- Chishū Ryū as Gozen-sama
- Gin Maeda as Hiroshi Suwa
- Yasukiyo Umeno as Tsuyoshi Suwa
- Takanobu Hozumi as Osamu Suwa
- Yoshio Yoshida as Director of travelling company of actors
- Chieko Misaki as Torajiro's aunt
- Hisao Dazai as Tarō Ume

== Critical appraisal ==
For his work on Tora-san's Love Call, and the previous two entries in the Otoko wa Tsurai yo series, Tora-san, the Good Samaritan, and Tora-san's Shattered Romance (all 1971), Yoji Yamada tied for Best Director at the Mainichi Film Awards with Masahiro Shinoda. The German-language site molodezhnaja gives Tora-san's Love Call three and a half out of five stars.

== Availability ==
Tora-san's Love Call was released theatrically on November 20, 1971. In Japan, the film was released on videotape in 1983 and 1995, and in DVD format in 1995 and 2008.

== Bibliography ==
=== English ===
- "OTOKO WA TSURAI YO TORAJIRO KOIUTA (1971)". British Film Institute. Archived from the original on 2012-10-17.
- "OTOKO WA TSURAIYO -TORAJIRO KOIUTA". Complete Index to World Film.
- Otoko wa tsurai yo: Torajiro koiuta (1971) at IMDb

=== German ===
- "Tora-San's Love Call" (in German). www.molodezhnaja.ch.

=== Japanese ===
- 男はつらいよ 寅次郎恋歌(1971) (in Japanese). allcinema.net.
- "男はつらいよ 寅次郎恋歌". Japanese Cinema Database (Agency for Cultural Affairs). Archived from the original on 2012-02-26.
- 男はつらいよ 寅次郎恋歌 (in Japanese). Japanese Movie Database.
- 男はつらいよ 寅次郎恋歌 (in Japanese). Kinema Junpo. Archived from the original on 2012-03-09.
