= Grey (album) =

Grey (灰色)

Studio album by Sandy Lam
- Released: August 21, 1987
- Genre: Cantopop
- Label: CBS Records

Sandy Lam chronology
Sandy (憶蓮) (1986)	Grey (灰色) (1987)	Ready (1988)

"Grey" is the fourth studio album by Sandy Lam, released under CBS Records on August 21, 1987. To continue the success of her last album in February of the same year, Sandy and her producers focused on the successful elements of her last album and applied onto this album, which introduced Eurodance into Hong Kong. Through this album, Sandy has proved herself as a determined singer who can always create breakthrough in her albums and performance. "Grey" was released very strategically by CBS Records. They were named Grey Project Phase 1, 2, and 3 respectively. Phase One showed Sandy looking directly at the audience, and the clothing and background was cream-white. Phase One was released in vinyl, cassette tape and CD. Phase Two showed Sandy looking at the audience at the corner of her eye, in which the background and clothing were mainly dark blue and black. Phase Two was released only in vinyl and cassette tapes. In Phase Three, Sandy showed no demand from the audience. She was in stark black and white. Like Phase Two, Phase Three was only released in vinyl and cassette tapes. Phase Three was a 12-inch remix of "Grey" and "Family Man".

== Track listing ==
1. Grey (灰色)
2. "Morning" ("早晨...")
3. Family Man (住家男人)
4. Accidental Experiment (無情實驗)
5. Unreal Show, Real Love (戲假情真)
6. Grey Make-up(灰色化粧)
7. Jukebox (點唱機)
8. Eagle and Stars (鷹與星)
9. You Can Only Live Once (祇可活一次)
10. Some Ending (某一個終點)

== Alternate versions ==
Grey (Grey Mix)--Released under "Grey Project Phase Three, The 12" Remix" 1987
Grey (Double Mix)--Released under "Grey Project Phase Three, The 12" Remix" 1987
Family Man (Special Rock Edition)--Released under "Grey Project Phase Three, The 12" Remix" 1987
Family Man (Hi-lite Mix)--Released under "Brand New Sandy" CBS record 1988
Grey Make-up (Extended Version)--Released under "Brand New Sandy" CBS record 1988

== Conceptual aspect ==
The thoughts, life and ideas of a single lady or Sandy herself is expanded in this album.

In this album, Sandy let out an even longer curly set of hair. This was her trademark along with her dance moves of "Grey", which was once again, choreographed by Clarence Hui. The mood of "Grey" is darker and rougher than her previous albums, hence why the album name, track 1, and track 6 gave reference. To aid with the concept, the photos in the album were all black and white depicting Sandy and bandmates practising at the rehearsal. Fans regard this album as to "less breakthrough, more commercial success" as compared to her last album.

== Commercial aspect ==
As a fast strategic follow-up of Sandy's success only a mere five months ago, "Grey" fared extremely well on the charts. "Grey" became very popular and earned Sandy several awards at the end of the year. "Grey" was a very mainstream album compared to many of her latter albums, which diverged even further into eclectic genres like dancehall and electronica.

"Grey" was the first peak of Sandy's career, which it went triple platinum(150,000 copies) and ended up as one of the best selling albums at the end of the year and in her entire career. "Grey" and "Morning..." also topped the RTHK charts at #1 and successfully earned Sandy two Jade Solid Gold season award. At the end of the year, she had a total of 3 nominations(one of which was "Passion" from her last album) from the Jade Solid Gold season awards. "Grey", the classic dance track, won Sandy one award in both the Jade Solid Gold and RTHK year end awards presentation. Other singles such as "Family Man" and "Grey Make-up" received mediocre airplay. "Grey" was so successful and commercial mainly because of the first single, which is obviously the title track, is a rare Eurodance in 1987 and has the classic catchy phrase-Ha Ha Ha Ha Ha Ha Ha... "Grey" was clearly intended to appeal to wider audiences through different musical genres and a concept in context with the audience.

== Musical aspect ==
Since CBS Records is a Japanese records company, Producer Fung would still require Sandy to cover some Japanese song for commercial reasons despite the success of her last album. Of course, like last album, Clarence and Sandy took the risk to cover English songs, such as "Heartache" by Pepsi & Shirlie for "Grey". In "Grey", Sandy explored different styles of music, such as Eurodance("Grey"), Jazz("Morning...") and Rock("Family Man", "Accidental Experiment"). This album had considerably more remixes than her previous albums, which eventually built Sandy as the Dancing Queen at one stage in Hong Kong. "Grey" was the album that brought in two of Sandy's two major composers of her latter albums. They were Andrew Tuason, who was most remembered for composing title track "Grey" on this album, and Anthony Lun, who was most remembered for writing and composing "Grey Make-up". Anthony Lun became a producer for Sandy's albums later.
