= Sandy Lam =

Hong Kong singer (born 1966)

- 林憶蓮
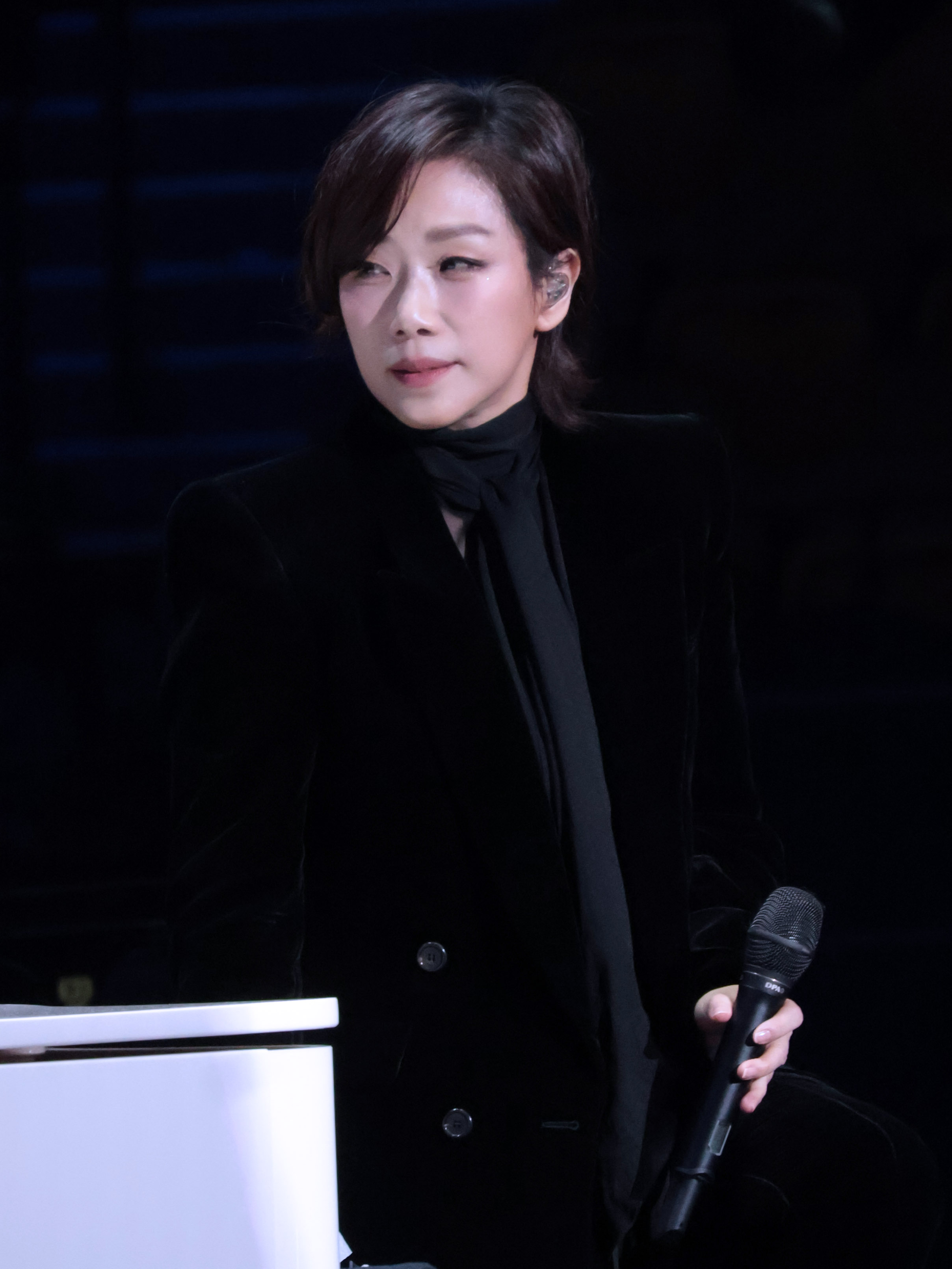
- Lam in 2024
- Born: 26 April 1966 (age 60); British Hong Kong
- Occupations: Singer; actress; producer
- Years active: 1982–present
- Spouse: Jonathan Lee (m. 1998; div. 2004)
- Children: 1
- Musical career
- Genres: Mandopop; Cantopop; electronic
- Instruments: Vocals
- Label: Stardust (1986–present) Universal Music (2012–present)

Chinese name
- Traditional Chinese: 林憶蓮
- Simplified Chinese: 林忆莲
Transcriptions
Standard Mandarin
- Hanyu Pinyin: Lín Yìlián
Yue: Cantonese
- Jyutping: lam4 jik1 lin4

Sandy Lam Yik-lin (林憶蓮; born 26 April 1966), is a Hong Kong singer. Initially a DJ, she released her debut album Sandy Lam (1985) and established herself as a pop diva in the 1990s. She won the Golden Melody Award for Best Mandarin Female Singer twice for Her albums, Gaia (2012) and 0 (2018).

== Early life ==
Born in Hong Kong on 26 April 1966 as the eldest of three children, Sandy Lam spent her early years in North Point. Music had always been a major part of the Lam family. Her father, emigrated from Shanghai, was a professional Erhu musician with the Hong Kong Chinese Orchestra and her mother performed Yue opera at local venues.

== A DJ and an actress ==
In 1982, while still a secondary school student at Marymount Secondary School, Lam was asked by a classmate to audition for a disc jockey position at the Commercial Radio Hong Kong. Soon after, she started working as a part-time DJ at Commercial Radio 2 with a stage name 611. In 1984, she became a full-time DJ and was spotted by Tony Lee of CBS/Sony Records for her talent during an outdoor performance singing Crying in the Rain. She was signed to CBS/Sony in 1985 and released her debut album in 1986. Meanwhile, Lam acted in the films Merry Christmas (聖誕快樂) (1984) and The Intellectual Trio (龍鳳智多星) (1985) and played the role of a nurse in a RTHK television series (左鄰右里) (1985).

== Musical career ==
Lam's musical career was not a breakout success. Her first Cantonese language album and corresponding imagery was heavily influenced by the Japanese idol craze. Yet, despite the popularity of this style in Hong Kong, Sandy failed to strike a chord with the general public. It was not until her album Grey (灰色) (1987) that the locals started taking the former DJ seriously as a singer. Both the title song "灰色" and a cover version of Berlin's "Take My Breath Away" (from the movie Top Gun) (激情) shot up the charts, bringing Lam her first awards at the 1987 Jade Solid Gold Best Ten Music Awards Presentation. She further showed her ability to transcend genres on the jazz-influenced Ready (1988).

=== City Rhythm ===
At this make-or-break stage of her career, it was the City Rhythm (都市觸覺) series that launched her into the big leagues, where she has remained ever since. A trilogy of records released between 1988 and 1990, City Rhythm gave Hong Kongers a taste of her true musical and conceptual capabilities, going platinum in the process. Serving as Executive Producer, the albums were filled with glossy dance-pop bops and ballads originally recorded by Western artists. City Rhythm was the first successful execution of a concept record in Cantopop. Lyrically daring, the series was feminist; representing the female experience of life and love on the busy Hong Kong streets, and embodied a woman who refused to compromise her aims and desires, with each song taking on a specific aspect of life.

Lam covered songs of artists such as Brenda K. Starr and Taylor Dayne. Through this series, Lam was encapsulated by the glitz and glamour of 1980s Hong Kong and golden-era Cantopop, while embodying its youthfulness and ambition. A collection of corresponding remixed records solidified her as Hong Kong's "Dancing Queen".

=== Wildflower ===
In 1991, Lam worked with Singaporean songwriter Dick Lee and released the coming-of-age album Wildflower "野花". With wildflowers being a metaphorical representation of the mental journey of a modern Asian woman, Wildflower was a collection of contemporary east-meets-west music. Marrying traditional themes and western jazz influences, Wildflower was credited with recognising the versatility and artistic talent of Lam and is said to have initiated the 'Unplugged' craze of early 90s Cantonese music – the creation of authentic and raw musical products that connected with the listener more intimately. Although reception was at first lukewarm, it was eventually recognized as a pioneering work in the Cantonese musical canon, and is now regarded as one of the most important and culturally defining albums of Cantopop.

=== Falling in Love With Someone Who Doesn't Come Home ===
Simultaneously, Lam was also developing her Taiwanese market and establishing herself in the world of Mandopop. Her debut Mandarin language album, Falling in Love With Someone Who Doesn't Come Home (愛上一個不回家的人) (1990), was not only a huge commercial success selling over 600,000 copies in Taiwan alone, but was seen as a watershed moment in Cantopop: the success prompted many Hong Kong musicians to test the waters of Mandopop, ushering in the start of Taiwan's regional dominance in pop music.

=== Love, Sandy ===
In 1995, she paired up with Taiwanese music producer Jonathan Lee and released her fourth Mandarin album Love, Sandy. A ten-track collection of ballads, love songs and R&B-inspired pop, the album was a commercial blockbuster selling 800,000 copies in Taiwan and 3 million across Asia, cementing her in new markets including Singapore and Mainland China. Almost every song became a hit record, with many becoming KTV standards. To date it remains one of the best-selling albums in Mandopop history.

Upon release of 14th Cantopop album Feeling Perfect (感覺完美) (1996), Lam spent most of her time in Taiwan, China, and Japan. Lam made a brief foray onto the stage in 1997 when she was cast as the female lead in Hong Kong's biggest musical Snow.Wolf.Lake (雪·狼·湖), the production went on to play 42 consecutive sold out performances in the Hong Kong Coliseum which remains the record today.

=== At Least I Still Have You ===
After a hiatus lasting years following the birth of her daughter, she re-emerged and released a steady stream of Mandarin albums into the mid-00s, honing her capabilities and continuing to push herself creatively. Works during this time included Clang Rose (鏗鏘玫瑰) (1999), critically praised for being avant-garde yet commercially viable, and Sandy Lam's (林憶蓮's) (2000) which included mega-hit At Least I Still Have You (至少還有你). A Korean remake of the song, sung by Super Junior-M, a sub-group of the K-Pop band Super Junior, was released on their Me album titled Dangsinigie (당신이기에) in 2008. From a lyrical perspective, Sandy took on a greater song-writing role for the first time on Truly… Sandy (原來…林憶蓮) (2001), where she co-wrote four songs. In the same year, Lam appeared as cast member of an Andrew Lloyd Webber concert Masterpiece in Beijing and Shanghai, which also featured West End and Broadway star Elaine Paige and China's all-time best-selling recording artist Kris Phillips. In April 2002, she was invited to sing the Mandarin theme song, On My Own (屬於我), when Cameron Mackintosh staged Les Misérables in Shanghai.

In 2005, Lam released her first Cantonese album in almost ten years: True Colour (本色). Following the Mandarin Breathe Me (呼吸) (2006) album, it would be over six years until we heard from Lam again on record. Using this time to tour, Sandy also considered next steps for her music. From 2009, Lam slowly began working on an album that she wanted to be different from anything she had done previously. Rather than playing safe and being too reliant on other producers and songwriters, Lam wanted to make a fundamental change to the way she made music.

=== Gaia ===
In 2012, Lam released Gaia (蓋亞). Titled after the Goddess of earth in Greek mythology, the album was boldly experimental in which she experimented with New Age sounds, adding spice to her repertoire.

Gaia was praised not only as a triumphant comeback, but held up as a landmark album in Mandopop. Lauded by critics as a forward-thinking and ground-breaking record, she was awarded four awards at the 24th Golden Melody Awards in 2013, including "Best Mandarin Female Singer" as well as "Best Mandarin Album", "Best Album Producer" and "Best Musical Arranger".

Lam continued to challenge herself in other avenues, for example in 2017 she was a surprise entrant in a Hunan Television show Singer 2017, which introduced her as a pop icon to a whole new generation of fans.

=== Re: Workz and In Search of Lost Time ===
She returned to Cantopop briefly, harking back to her early days by releasing two albums of cover songs from 1980s Hong Kong, namely Re: Workz (2014) and In Search of Lost Time (陪著我走) (2016), rearranging and adapting the songs to different styles and genres.

=== Singer 2017 ===
In January 2017, Lam joined Hunan Television's show Singer 2017, as one of the eight initial singers (contestants who entered the competition on the first week with exemption in the Breakout round). She was declared the winner in the final on 15 April 2017.

=== 0 ===
In 2018, Lam released her 12th Mandarin album 0 under negligible promotional-fanfare. Three years in the making, 0 continued Lam's path of challenging herself musically. Releasing her first single "Core", for the second time, collaborated with Mayday's main vocalist Ashin. A deeply emotional yet analytical affair, 0 is a record that tries to understand and explain the many concepts of zero, including the idea of beginnings and endings. Lam won "Best Mandarin Female Singer" and "Best Recording Vocal Album" awards for this album at the 30th Golden Melody Awards in 2019.

== Personal life ==
Lam married Taiwanese singer-songwriter and producer Jonathan Lee in 1998. They have a daughter together, Renee (李喜兒), born on 17 May 1998. Both Lam and Lee divorced in 2004. Lam was also in an eight-year relationship with drummer and singer-songwriter Jun Kung from 2011 to 2019.

== Discography ==
=== Cantonese albums ===
- Sandy Lam (林憶蓮) (1985)
- Self-Indulgence (放縱) (1986)
- Sandy (憶蓮) (1987)
- Grey (灰色) (1987)
- Ready (1988)
- City Rhythm I (都市觸覺 Part I City Rhythm) (1988)
- City Rhythm II (都市觸覺 Part II 逃離鋼筋森林) (1989)
- Part III - Faces And Places (都市觸覺 Part III Faces And Places) (1990)
- Drifting (夢了、瘋了、倦了) (1991)
- Wildflower (野花) (1991)
- Come Back To Love (回來愛的身邊) (1992)
- Begin Again (不如重新開始) (1993)
- Sandy '94 (1994)
- Feeling Perfect (感覺完美) (1996)
- S/L (本色) (2005)
- Re: Workz (2014)
- In Search of Lost Time (陪著我走) (2016)

=== Mandarin albums ===
- Falling in Love With Someone Who Doesn't Come Home (愛上一個不回家的人) (1990)
- City Heart (都市心) (1991)
- Doesn't Matter Who I Am (不必在乎我是誰) (1993)
- Love, Sandy (1995)
- Night's Too Dark (夜太黑) (1996)
- Clang Rose (鏗鏘玫瑰) (1999)
- Sandy Lam's (林憶蓮's) (2000)
- 2001 Sandy (2001蓮) (2000)
- Truly... (原來…) (2001)
- Breathe Me (呼吸) (2006)
- Gaia (蓋亞) (2012)
- 0 (0) (2018)

=== Japanese albums ===
- Simple (1994)
- Open Up (1995)

=== English albums ===
- I Swear (愛是唯一) (1996)
- Wonderful World (美妙世界) (1997)

== Filmography ==
=== Motion pictures ===
Year	Title	Role
1984	聖誕快樂 Merry Christmas	Student in an aerobic class
1985	龍鳳智多星 The Intellectual Trio	Slant Eyes
1986	冒牌大賊 Who's The Crook?	Monaliza Ho
1988	群龍奪寶 Three Against the World	Fan's daughter
1988	猛鬼學堂 The Haunted Cop Shop II	Miss Bad Luck
1989	打工狂想曲 Gift From Heaven	Candy Lam
1990	亂世兒女 Shanghai, Shanghai	Pao

=== Television ===
Year	Title
1984–85	左鄰右里 The Neighbourhood
1990	同居三人組 When the Sun Shines

== Major awards ==
Year	Event	Award
1990	Commercial Radio Ultimate Song Chart Awards	Best Female Singer (Gold)
1991	RTHK Top 10 Gold Songs Awards	Top 10 Songs ("Home Again Without You" 愛上一個不回家的人)
1991	RTHK Top 10 Gold Songs Awards	Outstanding Mandarin Song Award ("Home Again Without You" 愛上一個不回家的人)
1991	Commercial Radio Ultimate Song Chart Awards	Best Female Singer (Gold)
1992	Commercial Radio Ultimate Song Chart Awards	Best Female Singer (Gold)
1995	3rd Singapore Hit Awards 1995	Best Female Vocalist
1995	3rd Singapore Hit Awards 1995	Best Album ("Love, Sandy")
2001	3rd CCTV-MTV Music Awards	Best Female Singer (Taiwan Region)
2001	8th Singapore Hit Awards 2001	Best Female Vocalist
2002	9th Singapore Hit Awards 2002	Asia Pacific Most Outstanding Female Artist Award
2002	9th Singapore Hit Awards 2002	Honorary Music Award
2005	5th Global Chinese Awards	Outstanding Achievement Award
2013	24th Golden Melody Awards	Best Female Mandarin Singer
2013	24th Golden Melody Awards	Best Mandarin Album ("Gaia" 蓋亞)
2013	24th Golden Melody Awards	Best Album Producer ("Gaia" 蓋亞)
2013	24th Golden Melody Awards	Best Music Arrangement ("Gaia" 蓋亞)
2019	30th Golden Melody Awards	Best Female Mandarin Singer
2019	30th Golden Melody Awards	Best Vocal Recording Album ("0")
2019	11th Freshmusic Awards	Best Album of the Year ("0")
2019	11th Freshmusic Awards	Best Female Singer

== Published work ==
Title	Publisher	Released date	ISBN
My Shanghai: Through Tastes & Memories	Times Editions	1 April 2004	ISBN 978-9812328328

Preceded by Coco Lee	Winner of I Am a Singer; Season 5; 2017	Succeeded by Jessie J
